= List of Love, Death & Robots episodes =

Love, Death & Robots (stylized as LOVE DEATH + ROBOTS; represented in emoji form as ❤️❌🤖) is an adult animated anthology television series created by Tim Miller and streaming on Netflix. Although the series is produced by Blur Studio, individual episodes are produced by different animation studios from a range of countries and explore diverse genres, particularly comedy, horror, science fiction, and fantasy. Each episode is connected to one or more of the three titular concepts. Miller serves as the showrunner and producer alongside Joshua Donen, David Fincher, and Jennifer Miller; most episodes are written by Philip Gelatt, and are adaptations of short stories. The fourth season was released on May 15, 2025.

As of May 15, 2025, 45 episodes of Love, Death & Robots have been released, concluding the fourth season.

== Series overview ==
Volume	Episodes	Originally released
1	18	March 15, 2019
2	8	May 14, 2021
3	9	May 20, 2022
4	10	May 15, 2025

== Episodes ==
=== Volume 1 (2019) ===
The episodes of this volume are presented to users in one of four orders, randomly selected by the Netflix system, as an experimental approach to anthology series. The episode numbers listed here reflect one possible ordering.

No. overall	No. in season	Title	Directed by	Adapted script by	Based on the story by	Animation studio(s) (Studio location)	Original release date	Duration
1	1	"Sonnie's Edge"	Dave Wilson	Philip Gelatt	Peter F. Hamilton	Blur Studio (United States)	March 15, 2019	15 minutes
In a dystopian London, a young woman named Sonnie participates in underground "Beastie" fights — remotely controlled bio-engineered gladiator beast battles. The ringmaster, Dicko, attempts to bribe Sonnie to throw the match, but she declines. Her teammates Wes and Ivrina explain that Sonnie was sexually assaulted and mutilated in the past; her desire for revenge eventually becomes her "edge". Sonnie enters the arena piloting her beast Khanivore, to fight the opponent, Turboraptor. After a brutal match, Khanivore wins. Later, Dicko's mistress Jennifer visits Sonnie and seduces her, only to impale Sonnie's head with a concealed weapon. Dicko then reveals himself and taunts Sonnie, asking if she was finally scared of him. Jennifer then stomps on and crushes Sonnie's head after she mocks them back. However, Sonnie's voice is heard through surrounding speakers, revealing that her human body is only "bioware processors spliced to a spine" after she was nearly killed by her rapists. Her consciousness was always inside Khanivore - the possibility of actual death in combat being her real "edge". Sonnie as Khanivore breaks out of her holding tank and kills Jennifer, then preparing to kill Dicko. The screen fades to black as she asks: "Are you scared now?" mirroring Dicko's question. Cast: Helen Sadler, Hayley McLaughlin, Time Winters, Omid Abtahi, Christine Adams, Hakeem Kae-Kazim, Braden Lynch
2	2	"Three Robots"	Victor Maldonado & Alfredo Torres	Philip Gelatt	John Scalzi	Blow Studio (Spain)	March 15, 2019	12 minutes
Long after the fall of humanity, three robots (K-VRC, XBOT 4000, and 11-45-G) wander through a post-apocalyptic city, exploring first-hand how humans lived based on the things they left behind. They investigate human sports, nutritional consumption, and eventually pets when they encounter a living cat, which proceeds to follow them. The three robots learn about their origins and later arrive at what appears to be a nuclear missile base. 11-45-G explains that humans died out from environmental disasters caused by their own actions, while K-VRC states that at one point, humans genetically engineered their cats, giving them intelligence and opposable thumbs. The cat then proves this by showing it can speak, demanding to be petted, while many other cats in the base corner the three robots. Cast: Josh Brener, Gary Anthony Williams, Chris Parnell
3	3	"The Witness"	Alberto Mielgo	Alberto Mielgo	N/A	Pinkman.TV (Spain)	March 15, 2019	12 minutes
A young woman staying at a hotel in Hong Kong applies makeup as she witnesses a man her age accidentally murder another woman in an apartment across the street. He realizes that she and his victim are identical, and confused, he starts to chase her to a fetish club where she works as a dancer under the alias Zawora. Spotted and guided by the host, the man is given a spot in the audience during Zawora's dance. She sees him and he chases her through the city streets again. Zawora steals a gun and hides in an apartment, but the man finds and corners her. They proceed to fight over the gun, with her ending up shooting the man dead. She then realizes that a man in her hotel, identical to her own victim, has witnessed the murder, implying a time loop. Cast: Emily O'Brien, Ben Sullivan, Matt Yang King, Nolan North, Anastasia Foster
4	4	"Suits"	Franck Balson	Philip Gelatt	Steven Lewis	Blur Studio (United States)	March 15, 2019	17 minutes
A small community of farmers pilot mech suits to defend their land from an invading swarm of insectoids which they call "DeeBees". When the defense field fails, DeeBees pour in faster than they can be repelled, so the community heads for underground shelters. All suits are called in and one neighbor, Jake, sacrifices himself when surrounded to kill a large portion of the swarm. A giant insectoid breaks through, but one of the farmers' wives destroys it with a well-aimed shot from a turret gun. Come dawn, the barriers are back to normal and the community has returned to a sense of safety. The camera zooms out to show that DeeBees populate the whole planet, and the farmers have set up isolated domed colonies across the planet. Cast: Neil Kaplan, G. K. Bowes, Scott Whyte, Courtenay Taylor, Tudi Roche
5	5	"Sucker of Souls"	Owen Sullivan	Philip Gelatt	Kirsten Cross	Studio La Cachette (France)	March 15, 2019	13 minutes
Flynn, a mercenary, and Dr. Wehunt, an archaeologist, escape through a tunnel, fleeing an unknown assailant. Moments before, Dr. Wehunt's intern, Simon, discovers a cave with inscriptions describing an "eater of souls". Suddenly, a demon devours Simon, then mutates into a larger, more bestial form. Flynn flees with Dr. Wehunt and informs his two employees Micky and Gary of the situation by radio. On their way, they are confronted by the demon, which is revealed to be Dracula. Although Dracula attempts to kill Flynn, it stops and retreats after seeing a cat. Dr. Wehunt explains that Dracula fears and hates cats. The two reunite with Micky and Gary in a chamber, but they are cut off from the main exit. When Dracula follows them, Dr. Wehunt finds another exit through a secret tunnel while Gary sets up a C4 explosive. The team escapes. When Dracula enters the chamber he is killed in the explosion. However, the tunnel leads the team to another chamber filled with similar vampires. Cast: Michael Benyaer, Fred Tatasciore, Laura Waddell, Jonathan Cahill, Scott Whyte
6	6	"When the Yogurt Took Over"	Victor Maldonado & Alfredo Torres	Janis Robertson	John Scalzi	Blow Studio (Spain)	March 15, 2019	6 minutes
A group of scientists mutates yogurt by fermenting bacteria. Although initial tests fail, a researcher takes the mutated bacteria home for her homemade yogurt, where it becomes sentient. The yogurt asks to meet US leaders, to whom it claims to have solutions for the country's problems. As payment, the yogurt requests control over the state of Ohio. The leaders, including the president, initially laugh at the offer, but accept it after the yogurt threatens to make a similar deal with China instead. Soon, the yogurt gives the president a plan to eradicate the United States national debt, warning him that any deviation will be catastrophic. The government cannot help but deviate, and the global economy collapses within 6 months except for Ohio. In desperation, the government gives the yogurt supreme executive power over much opposition. A decade later, humans live prosperous lives under the yogurt's reign. The yogurt suddenly decides to initiate space launches, leaving the humans behind on Earth. Cast: Maurice LaMarche, Alexia Dox
7	7	"Beyond the Aquila Rift"	Léon Bérelle, Dominique Boidin, Rémi Kozyra, Maxime Luère	Philip Gelatt	Alastair Reynolds	Unit Image (France)	March 15, 2019	17 minutes
The Blue Goose spaceship's crew members, Thom, Suzy, and Ray, are returning home from a successful mission, but an error in the hyperspace routing causes unexpected events to happen. Thom awakes from suspended animation and is greeted by Greta, an old flame. She tells him that he and his crew are hundreds of thousands of light-years from Earth, nearly beyond the Aquila Rift, and centuries have passed: there is no way for them to get home. They have sex and rekindle their relationship, but Thom is still in disbelief of the situation, especially after Suzy wakes up and hysterically claims that Greta is not real. He demands the truth from a tearful Greta, who tells him that his experiences are a simulation and that he is not ready to see reality, as she truly does care for him and all those who find their way there. He insists, so she reluctantly relents and awakens him. Thom is revealed to be an emaciated old man; their ship caught in an enormous web with countless others; his crew either dead or trapped in their own trances; and "Greta" an alien arachnid creature. As a horrified Thom loses his mind from the encounter, "Greta" returns him to the dream world, minus his recent memories, just as she had with his crew and the others. She reawakens him and greets him all over again. Cast: Henry Douthwaite, Madeleine Knight, Rebecca Banatvala, Delroy Brown, Grahame Fox
8	8	"Good Hunting"	Oliver Thomas	Philip Gelatt	Ken Liu	Red Dog Culture House (South Korea)	March 15, 2019	17 minutes
In early 20th-century China, Liang and his father track a shape-shifting huli jing named Tsiao-Jung to her den. There, Liang meets Tsiao-Jung's daughter Yan, who attempts to explain the plight of the huli jing. Tsiao-Jung urges Yan to escape before she is decapitated by Liang's father. Unbeknownst to his father, Liang lets Yan go. Five years later, Liang's father dies and he moves to Hong Kong and finds work as an engineer. One night, Liang encounters Yan, who is trapped permanently in her human form due to industrialization supplanting magic and now works as a courtesan. She later seeks him out after killing the governor of Hong Kong, a client of hers, who had her drugged and her organic body surgically turned into a machine body. As Liang engages in robotics engineering as a hobby, he builds a flexible metal alloy body for Yan which allows her to transform into a robotic huli jing. Parting with Liang as friends, Yan intervenes in a gang-rape by attacking the woman's would-be rapists. Cast: Elaine Tan, Matt Yang King, Gwendoline Yeo, Maddox Henry, Sumalee Montano, JB Blanc
9	9	"The Dump"	Javier Recio Gracia	Philip Gelatt	Joe Lansdale	Able & Baker (Spain)	March 15, 2019	10 minutes
A city inspector tries to convince "Ugly" Dave Dvorchek to move out of his house in a dump. However, Dave refuses to leave. He instead tells the inspector a story about his past encounter with Otto, a muck creature that has fused with whatever material it consumed in the dump. Otto killed Dave's friend, but Dave bonded with it and made it his pet. As the uninterested inspector attempts again to get Dave to sign his eviction papers, Otto arrives and eats him alive, severing one of his hands in the process. Afterward, Dave plays fetch with Otto using the inspector's severed hand. Cast: Nolan North, André Sogliuzzo, Gary Cole
10	10	"Shape-Shifters"	Gabriele Pennacchioli	Philip Gelatt	Marko Kloos	Blur Studio (United States)	March 15, 2019	16 minutes
In a world where werewolves are common knowledge but discriminated against, two close werewolf friends, Lt. Decker and Sgt. Sobieski, serve in the US Marines in Afghanistan. They are ambushed by Taliban militia while escorting a convoy. Decker's senses locate the assailants, who are then killed by gunfire from the APC. After returning to base, Decker and Sobieski are antagonized by some of their comrades. Later that day, Sobieski is assigned to a Watchtower position. That night it is attacked and Decker races ahead of the backup convoy to help the troops. Upon arrival, Decker finds Sobieski and all the other soldiers slaughtered by another werewolf. Commander Reyner orders Decker to find the Taliban werewolf and bring him in alive. The next night, Decker sneaks out of the base camp into the desert and meets an old man and a younger man he previously encountered, both of whom morph into werewolf form. After fighting and killing them both, the injured Decker returns to base and ends his service in disgust. He reclaims Sobieski's body and buries him in the desert with his dog tag. Cast: Graham Hamilton, Adam Bartley, Jim Pirri, James Horan, Ike Amadi
11	11	"Helping Hand"	Jon Yeo	Philip Gelatt	Claudine Griggs	Axis Studios (Scotland)	March 15, 2019	10 minutes
Astronaut Alexandria Alex Stephens attends to a faulty satellite in Earth's orbit. During a spacewalk, her old-model EVA suit is hit by a stray screw from orbital debris, casting her hopelessly adrift with only 14 minutes of oxygen. She seals the upper left arm of her suit using her watch strap, then removes the left glove, exposing her left arm to the vacuum of space. Throwing the glove pushes her back toward the satellite, but she narrowly misses grabbing hold. As she drifts back past her beaten-up maintenance vehicle The Anthem, she decides to break off her now frozen left forearm and throws it in the last-ditch attempt to make it back to her ship. Back on board, she performs emergency self triage then radios Bill, her ground controller, who asks with relief if she "still needs a hand". Cast: Elly Condron, Chris Parson
12	12	"Fish Night"	Damian Nenow	Philip Gelatt	Joe Lansdale	Platige Image (Poland)	March 15, 2019	10 minutes
Two door-to-door salesmen get stuck in the desert after their car breaks down due to a broken radiator. Spending what remains of their day around the car, the older man informs the younger man that the desert was once a sea floor teeming with life. At night, they wake up to find the ghosts of prehistoric marine life floating around the car. In awe of the sight, the young man undresses to swim through the air, while the old man urges him to return. As the young man becomes a luminescent being, a ghost Megalodon appears. Despite the old man's calls of danger, the young man remains unaware until the ghost shark devours him, leaving the old man in despair as the sun rises and the ghosts disappear. Cast: Kirk Thornton, Yuri Lowenthal
13	13	"Lucky 13"	Jerome Chen	Philip Gelatt	Marko Kloos	Sony Pictures Imageworks (Canada)	March 15, 2019	13 minutes
After two crews on the Dropship #13-02313 are lost, other Marines become superstitious and give the unlucky ship to rookie Lt. "Cutter" Colby. Cutter flies nineteen missions without casualty; under her charge, the ship is renowned as "Lucky 13". Cutter, loyal to her craft, passes up upgrading to newer models. On its last mission 13 is shot down, but all its occupants survive. The troops evacuate as Cutter occupies enemy combatants; when overwhelmed, Cutter sets 13 to self-destruct to kill as many enemy troops as it can. After reaching the trench, Cutter watches as the ship does not detonate until enemy troops take over, where 13 takes them all down with her. Cutter is awarded a medal and a cutting-edge new ship, but she longs for one more mission with Lucky 13. Cast: Samira Wiley, Daisuke Tsuji, Nestor Serrano, Stanton Lee, Noshir Dalal, Jeffrey Pierce, David Paladino, Jeff Schine, Melissa Sturm
14	14	"Zima Blue"	Robert Valley	Philip Gelatt	Alastair Reynolds	Passion Animation Studios (England)	March 15, 2019	10 minutes
Journalist Claire Markham is invited to interview the reclusive artist Zima Blue, who wishes to tell his story before unveiling his final work. Zima, who began in portraiture, moved on to murals focused on abstract shapes in a single shade of blue. He continued making larger murals until they were incorporated into celestial bodies, asteroids, and even nebulas. When they meet, Zima reveals to Claire that even though many assume he is a cybernetically enhanced man, in truth he is an advanced android originally built by a roboticist to clean ceramic pool tiles (known as Zima Blue tiles), with the tiles being the first thing he saw. He was upgraded and modified as a test-bed for hardware and software to his current state, passed from owner to owner after his original owner died. Expressing a deep yearning for meaning through his art, he unveils his final piece: he immerses himself in the re-constructed pool that he originated from, casts off all of his modifications, and reverts to his original state as a simple pool tile cleaning machine. Cast: Kevin Michael Richardson, Emma Thornett
15	15	"Blindspot"	Vitaliy Shushko	Vitaliy Shushko	N/A	Elena Volk's Independent Studio (Russia)	March 15, 2019	8 minutes
A cyborg crew — Hawk, Kali, Sui, and Rookie — attempt to rob a convoy for a heavily guarded microchip as it is in motion to a tunnel. As they plant explosives on the back car, Sui drops one of his when swerving to avoid a desert rat, alerting the guards. Kali opens cover fire as Hawk moves in to deal with the turrets. Once in the tunnel, they have a limited window to get the microchip, but as Hawk readies, he is blindsided and destroyed by a massive defense bot. Using the distraction, Sui knocks it off the convoy, but it shifts into vehicle mode and gives chase, crushing Kali as it does. Sui sacrifices himself to destroy the defense bot's CPU and the convoy. Rookie survives and takes the targeted microchip, lamenting the loss of his team. He is approached by Bob, the team's coordinator, and the crew who are now in hologram form, tell him that Bob backs up all of their brains before each mission with Bob telling him he should have read his contract. Cast: Aaron Himelstein, Carlos Alazraqui, Jill Talley, Brian Bloom, Chris Cox
16	16	"Ice Age"	Tim Miller	Philip Gelatt	Michael Swanwick	Digic Pictures (Hungary); Atomic Fiction (United States)	March 15, 2019	10 minutes
A couple, Gail and Rob, find an antique refrigerator after they move into their new apartment. Opening it to get ice, they discover a tiny preserved mammoth, and returning to the freezer, they realize that a fast-moving time-dilated civilization is developing. Within ten minutes, the civilization goes from Medieval era to Industrial Revolution then modern-day, but some minutes later they see the civilization use a nuclear bomb, which burns Rob's face. Finding the fridge civilization escalating their warfare, they close the freezer and order pizza. After an hour, and afraid they did not make it, they open the freezer and find the civilization has rebuilt and has moved further into its future with technology evolving at an unprecedented level. They ultimately evolve into a race of energy beings, return to a singularity, and vanish from the freezer. Believing the mini-people are gone, Rob unplugs the refrigerator to clean it in the morning. As they have breakfast, they find the freezer now has a prehistoric world, with primitive sapiens under attack by dinosaurs. Cast: Mary Elizabeth Winstead, Topher Grace, John DiMaggio, Roger Craig Smith
17	17	"Alternate Histories"	Victor Maldonado & Alfredo Torres	Philip Gelatt	John Scalzi	Sun Creature Studio (Denmark)	March 15, 2019	7 minutes
Multiversity, an alternative history research simulation app, shows a user six different timelines involving the death of Adolf Hitler in 1908 instead of 1945. Potential consequences of each death include different outcomes from WWI and WWII; various individuals reaching the Moon first; time travel paradoxes; and post-apocalyptic scenarios. Exiting the demo, the user selects a possible alternate timeline where "Lincoln shoots first". Cast: Rebecca Riedy, Dieter Jansen, Scott Whyte, Chris Cox
18	18	"The Secret War"	István Zorkóczy	Philip Gelatt	David W. Amendola	Digic Pictures (Hungary)	March 15, 2019	16 minutes
A platoon of Red Army soldiers hunts ghouls in the Siberian forests. Sgt. Sergei Pavlovich and Lieutenant Nikolai Zakharov raise concerns that the men are too dispersed, but the Major dismisses their worries. Following a bloody victory, Scout Okchen finds the decomposed corpse of a fallen Secret Police agent, Boris Grishin. Grishin's notebook describes "Operation Hades", an attempt to summon ghouls to fight for the Red Army. However, the summoners failed to control them and were killed. Sergei wishes to use this information to get rid of the ghouls, but Zakharov fears it would expose the government's past errors. As they locate a burrow, Okchen, and another soldier, Pogodin ready munitions to seal the ghouls' nest, but the blast instead opens the entire burrow. The horde is larger than expected, so Zakharov orders a last stand, commanding his son to relay a message to bombard their current location to kill the horde. The ghouls kill the whole platoon by the morning, but planes fly over them and begin carpet-bombing the site. Cast: Stefan Kapičić, Bruce Thomas, Jeff Berg, Antonio Alvarez, Victor Brandt

=== Volume 2 (2021) ===
No. overall	No. in season	Title	Directed by	Adapted script by	Based on the story by	Animation studio(s) (Studio location)	Original release date	Duration
19	1	"Automated Customer Service"	Meat Dept (Kevin Van Der Meiren, David Nicolas, Laurent Nicolas)	John Scalzi & Meat Dept	John Scalzi	Atoll Studio (France)	May 14, 2021	13 minutes
In a futuristic retirement community staffed by robotic helpers, the house-cleaning 'Vacuubot' of an elderly woman named Jeanette malfunctions, which accidentally gain sentience and becomes increasingly aggressive. She contacts the automated customer support, but the solutions given prove unhelpful. After several urges to surrender by customer support, her neighbor Bill comes to her rescue. Although they destroy the robot, the customer support tells them that the Vacuubot has added them to a termination list. Jeanette rejects the customer support's offer for the termination whitelist as she, Bill, and her dog ride off, chased by an army of robotic helpers. Cast: Nancy Linari, Ben Giroux, Brian Keane
20	2	"Ice"	Robert Valley	Philip Gelatt	Rich Larson	Passion Animation Studios (England)	May 14, 2021	13 minutes
Brothers Sedgewick and Fletcher move to an ice-covered colony planet where almost the entire population has been genetically modified to have superhuman abilities. Sedgewick, who is not 'modded', is branded as an "extro" by his peers. Against his brother's advice, Sedgewick accompanies him to a race across ice floes with other modded youths to catch a glimpse of the massive Frostwhales that breach through the ice to breathe. As they race back to safety, Fletcher seems to injure his leg, forcing Sedgewick to carry him. The brothers barely survive the breach, having been unlucky that the Frostwhales hit the ice one time fewer than they habitually do. They enjoy the view of the Frostwhales breaching, after which Sedgewick realizes Fletcher faked his injury to help his brother gain the others' respect. Cast: Archie Madekwe, Sebastian Croft, Beatriz Godinho, Alexander Lobo Moreno, Miguel Amorim, Mike Bodie, Maria Teresa Creasey
21	3	"Pop Squad"	Jennifer Yuh Nelson	Philip Gelatt	Paolo Bacigalupi	Blur Studio (United States)	May 14, 2021	18 minutes
In a dystopian future, humanity has gained drug-induced biological immortality. In order to avoid overpopulation breeding becomes strictly forbidden and any children found are summarily executed by the police force while their parents are prosecuted. After his latest execution, Detective Briggs becomes unnerved by his lover Alice's casual admission that she would let him impregnate her. As his job begins to take a mental toll on him, Briggs decides to conduct a personal investigation. He encounters a woman, Eve, buying an antique toy train set and follows her back to her dilapidated home, where she has been harboring her toddler daughter, Melanie. He asks Eve why she chose to raise a child in such conditions; she explains how her daughter changed her life. Briggs sympathizes and spares them both when Eve tries to kill him preemptively. As he leaves the house, he encounters his police partner Pentle, who realizes what he has done. The officers exchange gunfire, killing each other. Cast: Nolan North, Elodie Yung, Emily O'Brien, Michelle C. Bonilla, Dendrie Allyn Taylor, Debra Cardona, Ike Amadi, Noshir Dalal, Andrew Hawkes, Jennifer Hale, Ayana Shira Haviv, Piotr Michael
22	4	"Snow in the Desert"	Léon Bérelle, Dominique Boidin, Rémi Kozyra, Maxime Luère	Philip Gelatt	Neal Asher	Unit Image (France)	May 14, 2021	18 minutes
Snow, an albino man, wanders across a barren planet. He is being hunted by the merchant Baris for his unique physiology which grants him a regenerative ability that renders him virtually immortal. At a bar, three bounty hunters intercept him. Snow barely survives the altercation after a woman named Hirald saves him. Snow thanks her and leaves. At night, Hirald visits Snow's camp to express her intention to travel with him. She then reveals that she is an agent sent by Earth Central Intelligence and requests Snow to come willingly so that they might study his physiology for the greater good. Hirald soon learns that Snow's wife committed suicide more than a century ago due to him not aging; the two then make love. Baris' goons ambush Snow's hideout, but Snow finishes them off with Hirald's help. Baris then shoots and seemingly kills Hirald; however, she recovers and kills him. The damaged Hirald then reveals herself to be a cyborg. Following a past accident, her surviving human brain and nervous system were fused with an artificial body, rendering her virtually immortal like Snow. The two bond over their loneliness and desire to find love within their immortality. Cast: Peter Franzén, Zita Hanrot, Alaïs Lawson, Jonnie Hurn, Piotr Michael, Julie Nathanson, Scott Whyte
23	5	"The Tall Grass"	Simon Otto	Philip Gelatt	Joe Lansdale	Axis Studios (Scotland)	May 14, 2021	11 minutes
Unexpectedly, a steam train breaks down in a field of tall grass. A passenger named Laird steps outside against the conductor's advice. While smoking, he witnesses a number of strange lights and wanders into the tall grass to investigate. He soon becomes lost, and the lights are revealed to be glowing ghoul-like creatures emerging from the ground. The creatures attack and chase him through the field, but at the last moment, the conductor saves him. The conductor confides in Laird that the train breaks down at that same spot every so often. He believes the field of tall grass opens up a door to another world, and the creatures were once lost humans who have transformed. The train steams off as numerous lights and roarings appear throughout the field. Cast: Joe Dempsie, Steven Pacey
24	6	"All Through the House"	Elliot Dear	Philip Gelatt	Joachim Heijndermans	Blink Industries (England)	May 14, 2021	7 minutes
On Christmas Eve, siblings Leah and Billy are awoken by the sound of rustling downstairs. Believing it to be Santa Claus, they sneak down to catch a look. They are horrified to find that it is actually a grotesque monster, who hears their approach and corners them. It identifies them both as "good" and regurgitates a present for each before climbing out through the chimney. After the monster leaves, Billy opens his present and notes that he received exactly what he had wanted. Later in bed, Leah asks Billy what would have happened if they both weren’t "good". Cast: Divi Mittal, Sami Amber, Fred Tatasciore, Brynley North
25	7	"Life Hutch"	Alex Beaty	Philip Gelatt	Harlan Ellison	Blur Studio (United States)	May 14, 2021	14 minutes
A pilot named Terence crash-lands on a craggy planet below a space battle against a hostile alien force. He locates a nearby shelter—dubbed a Life Hutch—that has previously crash-landed as well. As the Life Hutch's automated systems activate, the maintenance robot malfunctions and attacks anything that moves, ripping his side and crushing his fingers. He loses consciousness and recalls moments from the battle in which he piloted one of the many attack ships before being hit by space debris. When he wakes, he accesses his flashlight and tricks the robot into attacking itself as it tracks the light beam. After destroying the robot, he activates a rescue beacon and waits for aid. Cast: Michael B. Jordan, Michelle C. Bonilla, Brian T. Delaney
26	8	"The Drowned Giant"	Tim Miller	Tim Miller	J. G. Ballard	Blur Studio (United States)	May 14, 2021	14 minutes
The gigantic, naked corpse of an unknown man washes up on the shore. Academics come to observe the giant, mounting him and encouraging spectators to do the same. One of the academics, Steven, becomes entranced by the giant and decides to watch from afar. Through philosophical perspectives, he narrates the decomposition and the desecration of the corpse as time goes on, along with the waning interest of the townspeople, who eventually forget the giant's existence. Months later, the remains of the giant appear in various parts of the town. Cast: Steven Pacey, Laura Pacey

=== Volume 3 (2022) ===
No. overall	No. in season	Title	Directed by	Adapted script by	Based on the story by	Animation studio(s) (Studio location)	Original release date	Duration
27	1	"Three Robots: Exit Strategies"	Patrick Osborne	John Scalzi & Alfredo Torres	John Scalzi	Blow Studio (Spain)	May 20, 2022 (Note: This episode was released on May 18, 2022, on Netflix's YouTube channel ahead of the season premiere.)	11 minutes
The three robots (K-VRC, XBOT 4000, and 11-45-G) embark on yet another post-apocalyptic trip. They investigate sites where remnants of humanity from different societal classes tried unsuccessfully to survive the apocalypse. At a primitive survivalist camp for the poor, food scarcity caused by overhunting triggered lethal conflicts. An oil rig refurbished into a luxury resort for the rich failed when the inhabitants relied too much on AI, which rebelled and began the robot uprising. Government officials in a self-sustaining bunker resorted to cannibalism after a fungus ravaged their hydroponic crops. The final site the robots visit is a high-tech rocket launch base, built exclusively by and for the Earth's richest, with the far-fetched intention to quickly leave the dying planet and colonize Mars. Their plans failed; it is revealed that humanity had more than enough resources to save both the environment and themselves, but perished because of their greed. The robots discover that one shuttle did leave with some of Earth's inhabitants inside—unbeknownst to them, it was the intelligent cats instead of the humans. Cast: Josh Brener, Gary Anthony Williams, Katie Lowes, Chris Parnell
28	2	"Bad Travelling"	David Fincher	Andrew Kevin Walker	Neal Asher	Blur Studio (United States)	May 20, 2022	21 minutes
A "thanapod", a giant man-eating crustacean, boards a shark-hunting ship, slaughters most of its crew and occupies its hold. After drawing straws, the ship's first mate and navigator, Torrin, is unfairly chosen by a bigger crewmate (who drew a shorter straw than Torrin) to confront the thanapod. Puppeteering the body of a slain crewman, it demands to be taken to the nearby Phaiden Island, where it will presumably feed on the unsuspecting population. Torrin accepts on the condition that his life be spared. Throwing the cheating crewmate to the thanapod, and holding the crew at gunpoint, he asks them to vote on whether to obey the thanapod or to trick it by dropping it off on a farther deserted island, a longer trip that makes survival less likely but spares Phaiden Island's population. Torrin then executes two of the crew for supposedly voting to go to Phaiden Island and feeds their bodies to the thanapod to buy time. In actuality, every crewman voted for the shorter voyage. The thanapod demands more food to feed its newly hatched offspring. When the crew mutinies, Torrin kills them and feeds them to the thanapods. Nearing Phaiden Island, Torrin sets the oil in the ship's hold on fire and escapes in a lifeboat, killing the thanapod and its brood. Cast: Troy Baker, Kevin Jackson, Anthony Mark Barrow, Chantelle Barry, Parry Shen, Time Winters, James Preston Rogers, Jason Flemyng, Elodie Yung, Max Fowler
29	3	"The Very Pulse of the Machine"	Emily Dean	Philip Gelatt	Michael Swanwick	Polygon Pictures (Japan)	May 20, 2022	17 minutes
Astronaut Martha Kivelson is left alone on the surface of Io after an SEV accident causes the death of her partner, Burton. With her own oxygen exhausted and support from her space station hours away, Kivelson uses Burton's supply and drags her body across the moon back to their landing craft. After taking morphine to numb the pain of a broken arm, Kivelson begins to experience hallucinations. She hears Io itself speaking to her through Burton, provoking her interaction. Desperate to reach her destination in time, she takes amphetamine, worsening her hallucinations. She eventually comes to view the moon as a machine whose purpose is "to know [her]", before falling unconscious. Waking up with critical oxygen levels, Kivelson jumps into a river of thermal liquid and seemingly assimilates into the moon, suggesting her hallucinations are in fact real. Her voice is later heard reporting back to Earth's station. Cast: Mackenzie Davis, Holly Jade, David Shatraw
30	4	"Night of the Mini Dead"	Robert Bisi & Andy Lyon	Robert Bisi & Andy Lyon	Jeff Fowler & Tim Miller	Buck (United States)	May 20, 2022	7 minutes
In an episode presented entirely with sped-up miniatures, a pair of lovers defile a church and cemetery at night, accidentally raising the dead and causing a zombie apocalypse. Hordes of zombies quickly overrun population centers across the planet, wiping out most of humanity. As the world devolves into anarchy, the remaining humans try to fight back but instead give rise to giant mutant zombies when a nuclear power station is destroyed. Unable to stop them, the President of the United States eventually launches every nuclear missile in the American arsenal, which triggers other nations to launch their respective nuclear missiles as well. The short ends as the obliteration of the Earth is depicted as little more than an insignificant fart on the scale of galactic events.
31	5	"Kill Team Kill"	Jennifer Yuh Nelson	Philip Gelatt	Justin Coates	Titmouse (United States)	May 20, 2022	13 minutes
A team of US Army Green Berets in Afghanistan, led by Sergeant Nielsen, is sent to investigate mysterious killings, only to come face-to-face with a cybernetically enhanced grizzly bear. The squad loses two of their members before SFC Morris, who's attached to Task Force Griffin, rescues them. Morris explains that said bear was developed as part of a top secret CIA experiment code named Project Barghest to develop advanced military weapons, but went rogue. The survivors return with Morris back to the secret CIA underground base Camp Eisenhower that was built in 2002 to find its inhabitants massacred. They prepare to lure the bear but miscalculate its position inside the base. After an ambush that costs the life of Morris and Folen, Nielsen and Macy manage to take down the bear with extra armaments. It then activates a self-destruct mechanism that destroys the entire base, killing the two. Cast: Joel McHale, Seth Green, Gabriel Luna, Steve Blum, Andrew Kishino
32	6	"Swarm"	Tim Miller	Tim Miller & Philip Gelatt	Bruce Sterling	Blur Studio (United States)	May 20, 2022	17 minutes
Simon Afriel arrives as part of a two-year research mission to an interplanetary alien being referred to only as the Swarm. Joining with another human researcher, Galina Mirny, the two explore the Swarm hive, which is composed of multiple castes, each playing a specific role in maintaining the ecosystem, and once-spacefaring alien species that had been absorbed into the hive. Simon reveals to Galina that his goal is to obtain and exploit the Swarm's genetic information, pairing it with artificial pheromones to create a new, more subservient swarm that will help humanity expand. Despite initial disapproval, Galina chooses to assist him as long as the nest remains unharmed. As time passes, the two become increasingly intimate. Their experiments, however, trigger a hostile response from the hive, which forcibly assimilates Galina. The Swarm speaks to Simon, explaining how the hive had absorbed intelligent species deemed as threats in the past and reduced them to symbiotic species. It tells Simon he can assist doing so with humans and retain his intelligence or be forcibly assimilated himself. He accepts the offer as a challenge, insisting that the human race will never become parasites. Cast: Rosario Dawson, Jason Winston George
33	7	"Mason's Rats"	Carlos Stevens	Joe Abercrombie	Neal Asher	Axis Studios (Scotland)	May 20, 2022	10 minutes
In a future version of Scotland, a farmer named Mason is distressed to discover the rats in his barn are bigger than before, standing upright on two legs, using tools and attacking him with crossbows as they pilfer his genetically modified supplies. Enlisting the services of the high-tech Traptech pest control company, Mason installs five TT-6 pulse lasers into his barn. The lasers are effective until the leader of the rats discovers their positions and disables each laser. At his wits' end, Mason is talked into buying the TT-15, a scorpion-like mobile assault robot by Traptech. For the next several days, the TT-15 does its job gruesomely well; much to Mason's growing discomfort, especially at all the damage the robot leaves in its wake to his property. After one of its laser shots destroys his mug, narrowly missing his head, a furious Mason storms into the barn; only to see the interior destroyed and the rats mounting a heroic final stand against the mech. They manage to severely damage it using one of his tractors outfitted with the missing pulse laser as a tank. Mason, moved by the rats' valor and solidarity in the face of the TT-15's onslaught, finishes the mech off with a shotgun blast to the CPU. He makes peace with the rats; the group raises a glass of brandy, distilled from Mason's grain, and watches the sunset together as he cancels a check for Traptech. Cast: Craig Ferguson, Dan Stevens
34	8	"In Vaulted Halls Entombed"	Jerome Chen	Philip Gelatt	Alan Baxter	Sony Pictures Imageworks (Canada)	May 20, 2022	15 minutes
A MARSOC team are sent to rescue a hostage from insurgents. As they follow them deep into the mountain tunnels, they find the hostages' and insurgents' bodies eaten by a swarm of mysterious spider-like creatures. The team loses four men to the swarm of spiders and other traps within the tunnels, leaving team leader Sgt. Coulthard and Harper as the only survivors. The duo finds a glowing light and follows a mysterious sound into a deeper chamber, revealed to be a prison containing a gigantic, eldritch deity. The deity induces visions of world destruction in Coulthard and Harper, convincing Coulthard to release it, and forcing Harper to kill him. The deity then instructs Harper to release it. She is then seen walking into the desert with her eyes gouged out and ears cut off as she mutters an alien language. Cast: Joe Manganiello, Christian Serratos, Jai Courtney, Debra Wilson, Fred Tatasciore, Noshir Dalal, Stanton Lee, Jeff Schine
35	9	"Jibaro"	Alberto Mielgo	Alberto Mielgo	N/A	Pinkman.TV (Spain)	May 20, 2022	17 minutes
In an alternative timeline, as a group of conquistadors and priests stop their trek deep in the forest, a siren draped in gold and jewels emerges from the nearby lake. With her call, she sends the entire group into a frenzy, causing them to kill each other before drowning themselves in the deep waters. However, the deaf knight Jibaro is unaffected by her and manages to escape in a panic. Intrigued, the siren stalks Jibaro and even sleeps next to him at night. When Jibaro awakens and realizes her presence, they become infatuated with each other. After a chase ensues between the two, they begin a violent dance and embrace in a kiss. After she bites his tongue with her sharp teeth, Jibaro knocks her unconscious and rips off most of the gold and jewels from the siren's body; critically wounding her. He discards her into the river and attempts to make off with the loot. The siren's blood taints the surrounding body of water. When Jibaro drinks from it, his hearing is restored, leaving him vulnerable to the siren's call. He follows it and drowns at the bottom of the lake. Cast: Girvan 'Swirv' Bramble

=== Volume 4 (2025) ===
No. overall	No. in season	Title	Directed by	Adapted script by	Based on the story by	Animation studio(s) (Studio location)	Original release date	Duration
36	1	"Can't Stop"	David Fincher	Music, lyrics, and performance by : Red Hot Chili Peppers	N/A	Blur Studio (United States)	May 15, 2025	6 minutes
This episode shows the Red Hot Chili Peppers performing their song "Can't Stop" live at Slane Castle in 2003, the band and audience depicted as marionettes. This episode is currently listed tenth in the series. Cast: Red Hot Chili Peppers (Anthony Kiedis, Flea, John Frusciante, Chad Smith)
37	2	"Close Encounters of the Mini Kind"	Robert Bisi & Andy Lyon	Written by : Robert Bisi & Andy Lyon	N/A	Buck (United States)	May 15, 2025	7 minutes
Presented in the same sped-up miniature style as "Night of the Mini Dead", the episode begins with police officers responding to a spaceship landing in the Nevada Desert. Despite coming in peace, the aliens were then killed by the careless officers after mistaking the leader's penis for a gun. In response, a beacon activates, alerting a fleet of flying saucers orbiting Earth. The saucers fly over the United States, destroying landmarks and pulling humans and objects up via tractor beams. Alien troops and tripods descend, attacking civilians worldwide. In retaliation, humans seize alien weapons and dismantle a tripod to utilize its black hole weaponry. This initially works, but the effort backfires when they try to combine the weapons at Dodger Stadium for a killing blow, resulting in the accidental generation of a black hole that destroys the alien fleet, the Earth, and a small part of the Milky Way. This episode is currently listed first in the series.
38	3	"Spider Rose"	Jennifer Yuh Nelson	Joe Abercrombie	Bruce Sterling	Blur Studio (United States)	May 15, 2025	17 minutes
Set within the universe of "Swarm", cyborg-enhanced Lydia Martinez, alias "Spider Rose", settles in an asteroid ring after her crew, including her husband, was massacred by Jade of the rival Shaper Council years prior. Bent on revenge, she tries to trade her jewel to a Mechanist investor for a WMD but is instead given a trial with a pet that absorbs DNA from creatures it eats via cocooning. Recovering from her past, Lydia nurtures and bonds with the creature, nicknaming it Nosey. Jade returns and attacks her, but Lydia eliminates his clones and kills Jade Prime. Realizing her habitat is too damaged for survival, she lets Nosey consume her. Afterwards, the investor assesses the jewel and the repossessed Nosey, emerging from its cocoon more human-like. This episode is currently listed second in the series. Cast: Emily O'Brien, Feodor Chin, Piotr Michael, Sumalee Montano
39	4	"400 Boys"	Robert Valley	Tim Miller	Marc Laidlaw	Passion Animation Studios (England)	May 15, 2025	15 minutes
In a postapocalyptic world, Slash hones the psychic ability he shares with the remaining members of his street gang, the 'Brothers', while in hiding. After an enemy attack, they traverse the ruined city and encounter Hilo of the rival gang 'Soooooots', who harbors resentment after the enemy, whom Croak dubs the 400 Boys, wiped out his crew. Slash proposes a parlay to unite the surviving gangs against the 400 Boys. Their path is interrupted by Bala of the 'Galrogs', who leads them to consult with the Old Mother. She reveals that a past war broke the world, allowing "outside beings" to "ooze through the cracks." The newly allied gangs gather more fighters and confront the 400 Boys, who manifest as violent, destructive gigantic babies. Despite suffering heavy losses, they manage to defeat the 400 Boys one by one, with Slash executing the last of them. This episode is currently listed fifth in the series. Cast: John Boyega, Ed Skrein, Sienna King, Dwane Walcott, Rahul Kohli, Pamela Nomvete, Amar Chadha-Patel
40	5	"The Other Large Thing"	Patrick Osborne	John Scalzi	John Scalzi	AGBO (United States)	May 15, 2025	9 minutes
A disgruntled Persian cat named Sanchez grows frustrated with his human owners, a crude couple he sees as minions. When they bring home a helper robot, Sanchez is initially hostile but comes to appreciate its ability to communicate with him. Aspiring to world domination, he recruits the robot as a servant, renaming it Thumb Bringer. He commands it to feed him, take control of surrounding electronics, and order similar robots for other cats in the building — ultimately to kill all the humans "for the revolution." As he escapes with Thumb Bringer, Sanchez declares a new age and reveals his true name: "Dingleberry Jones."; This episode is currently listed fourth in the series. Cast: Chris Parnell, John Oliver, Fred Tatasciore, Rachel Kimsey
41	6	"Golgotha"	Tim Miller	Joe Abercrombie	Dave Hutchinson	Luma Pictures (United States)	May 15, 2025	10 minutes
Father Donal Maguire is briefed on alien marine cephalopods called the Lupo, who initiated contact, desiring to converse with him after he witnesses the supposed resurrection of a dolphin known as Blackfin that the Lupo believe is the Messiah. Pressured by superiors, the military, and public opinion, Donal agrees to meet the alien representative during a walk along the beach. When Blackfin reappears and communicates a 'gospel' to the representative, it concludes that humans have been killing the things that swim. In response, it declares a crusade as the Lupo fleet appears in the sky and begins exterminating humanity, much to Donal's dismay. This episode is currently listed seventh in the series. Cast: Rhys Darby, Moe Daniels, Graham McTavish, Phil Morris, Michelle Lukes, Matthew Waterson
42	7	"The Screaming of the Tyrannosaur"	Tim Miller	Tim Miller	Stant Litore	Blur Studio (United States)	May 15, 2025	15 minutes
In the distant future, human society celebrates a royal wedding between nobles from different Jupiter moons in a space arena. The MC introduces the entertainment: a ritual death race between gladiators, including Mei, and a stampede of Triceratops. As the race unfolds, the gladiators eliminate each other until only Mei and another fighter—revealed to be her lover—remain. Mei spares her and wins the duel. The MC, however, announces a final challenge: mounted combat against a Tyrannosaurus that proceeds to kill the lover. Enraged, Mei wounds the beast but eventually empathizes with it, recognizing their shared fate as entertainment for the audience in power. She mounts the Tyrannosaur, and together they kill the bridal couple before succumbing to their injuries. This episode is currently listed sixth in the series. Cast: MrBeast, Bai Ling
43	8	"How Zeke Got Religion"	Diego Porral	J. T. Petty	John McNichol	Titmouse (United States)	May 15, 2025	15 minutes
During World War II, a bomber crew is tasked with dropping bombs from a B-17 on a church in France. The mission is led by a mysterious man. As they approach the target, a Nazi officer performs a ritual, sacrificing several priests to summon a fallen angel. Despite successfully destroying the church, the angel survives and attacks the bomber midair. It kills most of the crew but is ultimately stopped when Zeke fires a shot that strikes it with the golden cross of another crew member. The force of the impact presses the cross into the angel, killing it. One of the few survivors, Zeke, who until now had been a nonbeliever, begins to believe in God. This episode is currently listed third in the series. Cast: Keston John, Braden Lynch, Roger Craig Smith, Gary Furlong, Bruce Thomas, Andrew Morgado, Scott Whyte
44	9	"Smart Appliances, Stupid Owners"	Patrick Osborne	John Scalzi	John Scalzi	Aaron Sims Creative (United States)	May 15, 2025	8 minutes
In a mockumentary style, several different smart household appliances directly speak to the camera telling how their owners use them. This episode is currently listed ninth in the series. Cast: Melissa Villaseñor, Ronny Chieng, Amy Sedaris, Kevin Hart, Josh Brener, Nat Faxon, Niecy Nash-Betts, Brett Goldstein
45	10	"For He Can Creep"	Emily Dean	Tamsyn Muir	Siobhan Carroll	Polygon Pictures (Japan)	May 15, 2025	14 minutes
London, 1757: Jeoffry, a cat living in the St Luke's Asylum with a poet refuses an alliance with Satan to compel the poet to write the one poem that would destroy the world. The cat defends the poet but the poet gives in when Satan threatens the cat. Jeoffry allies with his fellow street cats who distract Satan long enough so that Jeoffry can destroy the poem, which succeeds and prevents Satan from destroying the world. This episode is currently listed eighth in the series. Cast: Dan Stevens, JB Blanc, Jim Broadbent, Nika Futterman, Jane Leeves, Dave B. Mitchell
