= Buck (design company) =

American creative design company

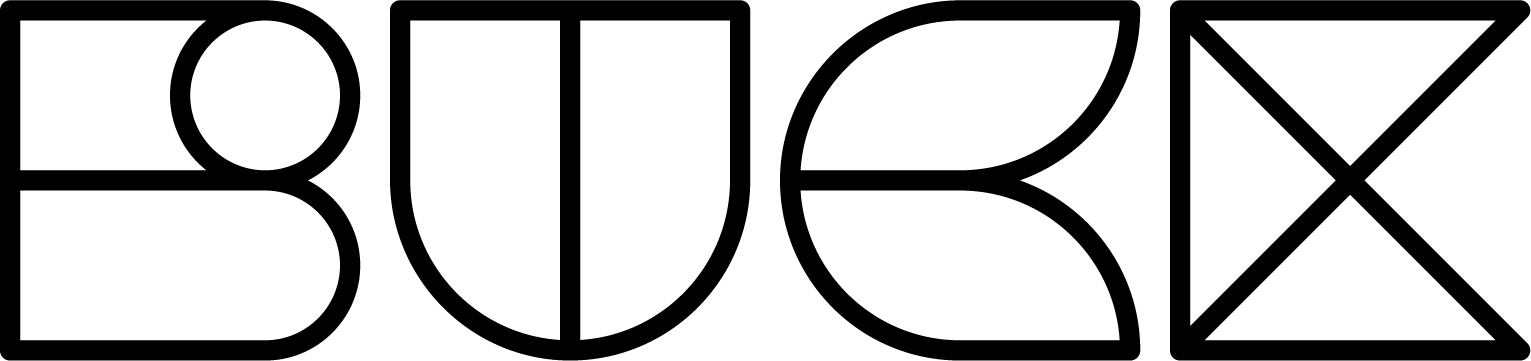
- Company type: Private corporation
- Industry: Advertising, entertainment, design, animation, technology
- Founded: 2004
- Founder: Jeff Ellermeyer, Ryan Honey, Orion Tait
- Headquarters: Los Angeles, California, U.S.
- Number of locations: 5 (Los Angeles, New York City, Sydney, Amsterdam, London)
- Website: buck.co

Buck (stylized in all caps) is an American creative design and production company founded in 2004 by Jeff Ellermeyer, Ryan Honey, and Orion Tait. The company works in animation and design for clients in advertising, technology, and entertainment. It has offices in Los Angeles, New York, Sydney, Amsterdam, and London.

== History ==
=== Founding ===
Buck was founded in 2004 by Jeff Ellermeyer, Ryan Honey, and Orion Tait in Los Angeles as a motion graphics and animation company. In 2006, they opened their second office in New York, headed by Tait. Their next office opened in Sydney, Australia in 2015, headed up by Gareth O'Brien. They opened their office in Amsterdam, Netherlands in 2021, and then an office in London in 2023, both headed by Vincent Lammers.

In April 2024, Buck announced Emily Rickard as its new CEO.

=== Name ===
Buck's name is inspired by Buckminster Fuller.

== Awards ==
Year	Award Ceremony	Category	Title	Client	Result
2023	AGDA	Motion Design & Animation	"Brewing Happiness"	Gong Cha	Distinction
2023	British Film Editors Cut Above Awards	Best Edited Animated Series	"Love, Death & Robots"	Netflix	Winner
2023	Clio Music Awards	Design | Fan Engagement	"#ImSuperShy"	YouTube	Silver
2023	Creative Review Annual	Illustration	OMGYES Illustrations	OMGYES	Winner
2023	D&AD	Illustration | Animated	"Give Where You Live"	MailChimp	Wood Pencil
2023	D&AD	Illustration | Digital	"Give Where You Live"	MailChimp	Wood Pencil
2023	D&AD	Impact | Local Solution	"Give Where You Live"	MailChimp	Wood Pencil
2023	The One Show	Moving Image Craft & Production	"Aircover"	Airbnb	Merit Winner
2023	European Design Awards	Digital | Motion Graphics	"What is GitHub?"	GitHub	Winner
2023	OoTWE Awards		Meta x Murakami at The Broad	The Broad	Winner
2023	VES	Outstanding Compositing & Lighting in An Episode	Love, Death & Robots "Night of the Mini Dead"	Netflix	Winner
2022	Clios	Discipline Category | Print & Out of Home Craft Illustration	Oracle Wordmarks	Oracle	Bronze
2022	Clios	Discipline Category | Design Craft Typography	Misfits Market Brand Film	Misfits Market	Bronze
2022	Emmy's Children's and Family (CAFE)	Outstanding Short Form Program	"We The People"	Netflix	Winner
2022	Good Design Awards	Digital Design | Apps and Software	"SnooZoo"	Bonds	Winner
2022	Good Design Awards	Communication Design | Advertising	Bankwest Campaign	Bankwest	Winner
2022	Best Design Awards	Moving Image | Short Form	Bankwest Campaign	Bankwest	Winner
2022	Best Design Awards	Digital | Digital Campaigns	"SnooZoo"	Bonds	Winner
2022	ADC	Illustration | ILT-101: Animation - Single	McDonald's Loyalty Rewards	McDonald's	Silver Cube
2022	ADC	Typography | TYP-101: Advertising	Misfits Market Brand Film	Misfits Market	Gold Cube
2022	Creativepool Annual	Typography	"The Art Department"	We Are Playgrounds	Bronze
2022	Creativepool Annual	Branding	"The Art Department"	We Are Playgrounds	Silver
2022	Creativepool Annual	Animation	"McNificents"	The Ronald McDonald House	Bronze
2022	Creativepool Annual	Illustration	"Hello Amsterdam"		Gold
2022	Dutch Creativity Awards	Design | Graphic	"The Art Department"	We Are Playgrounds	Winner
2022	NAACP Image Awards	Outstanding Animated Series	"We the People"	Netflix	Winner
2021	AGDA Awards	Motion | Commercial + Advertising	Facebook Messenger Vanish Mode	Facebook	Merit
2021	AGDA Awards	Motion | Animation Craft	"Halo"	Amazon	Pinnacle
2021	AGDA Awards	Design for Good | Health + Wellbeing	"How's Your Head?"	DOH	Merit
2021	AGDA Awards	Motion | Animation Craft	Yoplait	Yoplait	Distinction
2021	AGDA Awards	Motion | Animation Craft	"Hail The Sun"	Sunbites	Distinction
2021	AGDA Awards	Motion | Commercial + Advertising	Sydney Water	Sydney Water	Distinction
2021	AGDA Awards	Design for Good | Environmental Responsibility	Sydney Water	Sydney Water	Merit
2021	ADC	Illustration: Animation / Series	"Big Change Starts Small"	Mailchimp	Gold Cube Winner
2021	ADC	Typography: TYP-106 Motion	"Between the World and Me"	HBO	Bronze Cube Winner
2021	ADC	Motion / Film / Gaming Craft: MOT-112 Movie Trailer	"Between the World and Me"	HBO	Merit Winner
2021	ADC	Brand / Communication Design: BCD-120 Self-Promotion Printed	Web AR Poster		Merit Winner
2021	NYFestivals Advertising Awards	NY01 New York City Award	New Yorker Festival	New Yorker	Silver
2021	Best Awards	Moving Image | Long Form	"Halo"	Amazon	Bronze
2021	Best Awards	Moving Image | Short Form	"How's Your Head?"	DOH	Bronze
2021	Best Awards	Moving Image | Short Form	Hulu Campaign	Hulu	Silver
2021	Best Awards	Moving Image | Short Form	“Really Real Fruit”	Yoplait	Bronze
2021	Communication Arts	Typography | Motion	"Between the World and Me"	HBO	Winner
2021	Communication Arts	Design | Motion	IDL Animation	IBM	Winner
2021	Communication Arts	Design | Motion	New Yorker Festival	New Yorker	Winner
2021	Communication Arts	Design | Motion	"Meals Finder"	No Kid Hungry	Winner
2021	Telly Awards	Branded Content | Craft | Art Direction	"Halo"	Amazon	Silver
2021	Telly Awards	Branded Content | Craft | 2D Animation	"3% Savings"	Westpac	Gold
2021	Telly Awards	Commercials/Marketing | Promotional Video | Motion Graphics/Design	"3% Savings"	Westpac	Silver
2021	Telly Awards	Commercials/Marketing | Promotional Video | Use of 2D Animation	"3% Savings"	Westpac	Silver
2021	Telly Awards	Commercials/Marketing | Promotional Video | Financial Services/Banking	"3% Savings"	Westpac	Gold
2021	Telly Awards	Commercials/Marketing | Promotional Video | Media Promotion	"Between the World and Me"	HBO	Gold
2021	Telly Awards	Commercials/Marketing | Promotional Video | D&I	"Between the World and Me"	HBO	Silver
2021	Telly Awards	Commercials/Marketing | Promotional Video | Fully Animated Piece	Wealthsimple Trade App	Wealthsimple	Silver
2021	Telly Awards	Commercials/Marketing | Promotional Video | Use of 3D Animation	Wealthsimple Trade App	Wealthsimple	Gold
2021	Telly Awards	Commercials/Marketing | Promotional Video | Financial Services/Banking	Wealthsimple Trade App	Wealthsimple	Silver
2021	Telly Awards	Commercials/Marketing | Promotional Video | Computers/Information Technology	Microsoft Office App	Microsoft	Silver
2021	Telly Awards	Commercials/Marketing | Promotional Video | Motion Graphics/Design	Microsoft Office App	Microsoft	Gold
2021	Telly Awards	Commercials/Marketing | Promotional Video | Fully Animated Piece	"Halo"	Amazon	Gold
2021	Telly Awards	Commercials/Marketing | Promotional Video | Fitness, Health and Wellness	"Halo"	Amazon	Silver
2021	Telly Awards	Commercials/Marketing | Promotional Video | Use of 3D Animation	"Halo"	Amazon	Gold
2021	Telly Awards	Commercials/Marketing | Promotional Video | Motion Graphics/Design	"Creativity for All"	Adobe	Gold
2021	Telly Awards	Commercials/Marketing | Promotional Video | Corporate Image	"Creativity for All"	Adobe	Silver
2021	Telly Awards	Branded Content | Campaign | Business to Business	"All In A Day's Work"	Mailchimp	Gold
2021	Telly Awards	Branded Content | Campaign | Animation	"All In A Day's Work"	Mailchimp	Silver
2021	Anthem Awards	Awareness Category | Special Projects	"We The People"	Netflix	Gold
2021	Anthem Awards	Awareness Category | Research Projects/Publications	RBG in RGB		Silver
2021	Anthem Awards	Awareness Category | Special Projects	"Between the World and Me"	HBO	Bronze
2021	Clio Music Awards	Film/Video Craft | Music Marketing | Animation | Single	A Voice Is All You Need: The Beatles	Amazon Music	Silver
2021	Clio Music Awards	Film/Video Craft | Music Marketing | Animation | Campaign	A Voice Is All You Need: Chance The Rapper "Sun Come Down" A Voice Is All You Need: Taylor Swift “You Need to Calm Down” A Voice Is All You Need: Lady Gaga “Rain on Me”	Amazon Music	Gold
2021	AWARD Awards	6558-K.49 K.49 Moving Image	"3% Savings"	Westpac	Bronze
2021	AWARD Awards	6557-K.12 K.12 Film Art Direction, Campaign	"3% Savings"	Westpac	Silver
2021	Campaign Brief - THE WORK	Work for Good	Sydney Water	Sydney Water	Winner
2021	Campaign Brief - THE WORK	Branded Content + Entertainment	"3% Savings"	Westpac	Winner
2021	Campaign Brief - THE WORK	Social Media	"3% Savings"	Westpac	Winner
2021	The Webby Awards	General Video | Trailer	"Between the World and Me"	HBO	Winner
2020	AICP	Design Category	"Creativity for All"	Adobe	Shortlisted
2020	Telly Awards	Branded Content | Fully Animated Piece	Amazon Lips: Chance the Rapper "Sun Come Down"	Amazon Music	Gold
2020	Telly Awards	Branded Content | Use of Animation	Amazon Lips: Chance the Rapper "Sun Come Down"	Amazon Music	Silver
2020	Telly Awards	Branded Content | 2D Animation	Amazon Lips: Chance the Rapper "Sun Come Down"	Amazon Music	Silver
2020	The One Show	Branded Entertainment | Art Direction	"Opening Film"	Apple	Silver
2020	D&AD	Graphic Design | Poster	"Creativity for All"	Adobe	Wood Pencil
2020	D&AD	Animation | Graphic Design	"Creativity for All"	Adobe	Wood Pencil
2020	ADC Awards	Illustration	"Creativity for All"	Adobe	Silver
2020	ADC Awards	Motion/Film/Gaming Craft | Motion Graphics	"Wonderful Tools"	Apple	Gold
2020	ADC Awards	Advertising | Motion	"Wonderful Tools"	Apple	Bronze
2020	ANDY Awards	Craft	"Wonderful Tools"	Apple	Gold
2019	Cannes Lions	Film Craft | Animation	"Share Your Gifts"	Apple	Gold
2019	Cannes Lions	Entertainment | Fiction Film: Up to 5 minutes	"Share Your Gifts"	Apple	Gold
2019	Cannes Lions	Film Craft | Production Design / Art Direction	"Share Your Gifts"	Apple	Silver
2019	Cannes Lions	Communication | Film Lion | Consumer Durables | TV / Cinema Film: Sectors	"Share Your Gifts"	Apple	Silver
2019	Cannes Lions	Communication | Film Lion | Consumer Durables | Online Film	"Share Your Gifts"	Apple	Bronze
2019	Cannes Lions	Entertainment for Music | Brand or Product Integration into Music Content	"Share Your Gifts"	Apple	Bronze
2019	ADC Awards	Advertising | Cinematography	"Share Your Gifts"	Apple	Silver
2019	ADC Awards	Advertising | Motion	"Share Your Gifts"	Apple	Silver
2019	ADC Awards	Advertising | Television	"Share Your Gifts"	Apple	Bronze
2019	ADC Awards	Advertising | Direction	"Share Your Gifts"	Apple	Bronze
2019	ADC Awards	Advertising | Special Effects	"Share Your Gifts"	Apple	Bronze
2019	ADC Awards	Motion / Film Craft | Animation	"Share Your Gifts"	Apple	Bronze
2019	The Best Awards	Moving Image: Short Form	"Power to The Pro"	Apple	Purple
2019	The Best Awards	Moving Image: Short Form	"Bankwest"	Bankwest	Gold
2019	The Best Awards	Moving Image: Interactive	"Slapstick App"	Buck	Gold
2019	The Best Awards	Moving Image: Short Form	"ZNE 3.0"	Adidas	Silver
2019	Telly Awards	Craft-Fully Animated piece for Promotional Video	"Power to The Pro"	Apple	Gold
2019	Telly Awards	Craft-Motion Graphics / Design for Promotional Video	"Power to The Pro"	Apple	Silver
2019	Webby Awards	Webby Winner for Best Animation	"Share Your Gifts"	Apple	Winner
2019	Webby Awards	People's Voice Winner for Best Art Direction	"Share Your Gifts"	Apple	Winner
2019	Webby Awards	People's Voice / Webby Winner for Social Video	"Share Your Gifts"	Apple	Winner
2019	The One Show	Branded Entertainment | Single	"Share Your Gifts"	Apple	Gold
2019	The One Show	Digital Craft | Animation	"Share Your Gifts"	Apple	Gold
2019	The One Show	Moving Image Craft | Single	"Share Your Gifts"	Apple	Silver
2019	The One Show	Branded Entertainment | Music Videos	"Share Your Gifts"	Apple	Bronze
2019	The One Show	Design | Animation	"Share Your Gifts"	Apple	Bronze
2019	Annecy	Commissioned Films	"Power to The Pro"	Apple	Official Selection
2019	ANDY Awards	Craft	"Share Your Gifts"	Apple	Gold
2019	D&AD	Visual Effects / CG Animation	"Share Your Gifts"	Apple	Yellow Pencil
2019	D&AD	Animation / Character Animation	"Share Your Gifts"	Apple	Graphite Pencil
2019	D&AD	Production Design / Branded Content & Entertainment	"Share Your Gifts"	Apple	Graphite Pencil
2019	D&AD	Visual Effects / Compositing	"Share Your Gifts"	Apple	Graphite Pencil
2019	D&AD	Visual Effects / Special Effects	"Share Your Gifts"	Apple	Wood Pencil
2019	Clio Awards	Use of Music - Original	"Share Your Gifts"	Apple	Grand Clio
2019	Clio Awards	Branded Entertainment | Music	"Share Your Gifts"	Apple	Gold
2019	Clio Awards	Branded Entertainment | Film - Scripted	"Share Your Gifts"	Apple	Silver
2019	Clio Awards	Audio Technique | Music	"Share Your Gifts"	Apple	Bronze
2019	Clio Awards	Film Technique (Animation)	"Share Your Gifts"	Apple	Bronze
2019	Clio Awards	Partnerships & Collaborations	"Share Your Gifts"	Apple	Bronze
2019	Clio Awards	Film Technique (Animation)	"Opening Film - March 2019 Apple Event"	Apple	Bronze
2019	Shark Awards	Animation Design | Film Craft - Animation	"Power to The Pro"	Apple	Bronze
2019	Epica Awards	Animation	"Share Your Gifts"	Apple	Silver
2019	Epica Awards	Branded Contents	"Share Your Gifts"	Apple	Silver
2019	Manchester Animation Festival	Animation Festival	"Power to The Pro"	Apple	Official Selection
2019	Lovie Awards	Internet Video | Craft or Branded Entertainment	"Power to The Pro"	Apple	Bronze
2019	Best Design Awards	Moving Image | Short Form	"Power to The Pro"	Apple	Purple
2019	Best Design Awards	Moving Image | Long Form	"Slapstick"	Buck	Gold
2019	London International Awards	Branded Entertainment | Scripted Short Film	"Share Your Gifts"	Apple	Silver
2019	London International Awards	Design | Branded Content	"Share Your Gifts"	Apple	Silver
2018
2018	Telly Awards	Use of Animation	"Invention of Together"	Tinder	Gold
2018	A-List Hollywood Awards	Craft Technique: Animation	"Invention of Together"	Tinder	Gold
2018	Motion Awards by Motionographer	Commercial: Single Spot	"Invention of Together"	Tinder	Winner
2018	Lovie Awards	Internet Video: Animation	"Invention of Together"	Tinder	Silver & People's Choice
2018	ADC Awards	Craft in Motion: Animation	"Invention of Together"	Tinder	Silver
2018	Clio Awards	Film Technique: Animation	"Power to The Pro"	Apple	Silver
2018	Clio Awards	Film Technique: Animation	"Invention of Together"	Tinder	Silver
2018	Epica Awards	Craft & Imagery: Animation	"Invention of Together"	Tinder	Bronze
2018	London International Awards	Motion Graphics / Animation	"Invention of Together"	Tinder	Bronze
2018	Cresta Awards	Craft Web Commercials: Animation	"Invention of Together"	Tinder	Finalist
2018	D&AD Professional Awards	Animation for Film Advertising	"Invention of Together"	Tinder	Graphite Pencil
2018	The One Show	Moving Image Craft: Animation	"Invention of Together"	Tinder	Merit
2018	Brand Film Festival	Craft & Tech: Animated	"Invention of Together"	Tinder	Official Selection
2018	AICP	Animation	"Invention of Together"	Tinder	Shortlisted
2018	Communication Arts	Digital Advertising: Single Online Video	"Invention of Together"	Tinder	Shortlisted
2018	Communication Arts	Digital Advertising: Single Online Video	"Power to The Pro"	Apple	Shortlisted
2018	Cannes Lions	Film Craft: Animation	"Invention of Together"	Tinder	Shortlisted
2018	Webby Awards	Craft: Best Use of Animation	"Invention of Together"	Tinder	Official Honoree
2018	Art of Creativity	Animation	"Invention of Together"	Tinder	Honorable Mention
2017	Ottawa International Animation Festival	Design	"Spectacle of the Real"	David Blaine	Best Design
2017	Klik	Commissioned Animation	"Spectacle of the Real"	David Blaine	Best Commissioned Animation
2017	Clio Entertainment Awards	Motion Graphics: Video Promo Technique	"Safari"	Sherwin Williams	Silver
2017	Clio Awards	Animation: Film Technique	"Safari"	Sherwin Williams	Silver
2017	Clio Awards	Animation: Film Technique	"Spectacle of the Real"	David Blaine	Bronze
2017	Emmys	Motion Design	"Spectacle of the Real"	David Blaine	Outstanding Motion Design
2017	Bass Awards	Best Commercial	"Safari"	Sherwin Williams	Gold
2017	Bass Awards	Best Programme Titles	"Spectacle of the Real"	David Blaine	Gold
2017	AICP Awards	Animation	"Spectacle of the Real"	David Blaine	Best Animation
2017	D&AD Awards	Film Advertising Crafts/Animation for Film Advertising	"Spectacle of the Real"	David Blaine	Yellow Pencil
2017	One Show Entertainment	Animation: Single or Series	"Spectacle of the Real"	David Blaine	Gold
2017	IAC Awards	Broadcasting Online Video	"Spectacle of the Real"	David Blaine	Best Broadcasting Online Video
2017	Telly Awards	Craft: Using of Animation for Commercials/Marketing	"Seed Matters"	Cliff Bar Family Foundation	Silver
2017	A-List Hollywood Awards	Animation: Moving Image Advertising	"Seed Matters"	Cliff Bar Family Foundation	Silver
2017	ADC Awards	Motion: Title Sequences	"Spectacle of the Real"	David Blaine	Silver
2017	ADC Awards	Animation: Craft in Motion	"Seed Matters"	Cliff Bar Family Foundation	Silver
2016	Ciclope Festival	Animation: Branded Content	"Seed Matters"	Cliff Bar Family Foundation	Gold
2016	KLIK! Amsterdam Animation Festival	Voiceover	"Seed Matters"	Cliff Bar Family Foundation	Best Voiceover
2016	Best Design Awards	Short Form Moving Image	"Cadbury & Oreo"	Cadbury	Gold
2016	Best Design Awards	Long Form Moving Image	"The Innovator"	The Woolmark Company	Gold, Best in Category
2016	Best Design Awards	Long Form Moving Image	"Blend Opening Titles"	Wine After Coffee	Gold
2016	D&AD Awards	Advertising Crafts/Animation for Film Advertising	"Doors"	AA	Wood Pencil
2016	One Show Entertainment	Animation	"Doors"	AA	Silver
2016	ADC Awards	Motion/Animation	"Hypervenom"	Nike	Gold
2016	ADC Awards	Motion	"Doors"	AA	Designism Cube
2016	ADC Awards	Animation	"Doors"	AA	Gold
2015	Holmes Report		"Let's Talk Costs"	BCBS of North Carolina	Runner Up
2015	KLIK! Amsterdam Animation Festival	Commissioned Animation	"Doors"	AA	Best Commissioned Animation
2015	ADC Awards	Motion/Animation	"Global Spice"	Sherwin Williams	Bronze Cube
2015	Midas Awards	Typography	"Priceless Surprises"	Mastercard	Silver
2015	Midas Awards	Art Direction	"Priceless Surprises"	Mastercard	Silver
2015	Midas Awards	Illustration	"Priceless Surprises"	Mastercard	Gold
2015	Midas Awards	Outdoor/Transit/Out-of-Home	"Priceless Surprises"	Mastercard	Gold
2015	Midas Awards	Animation	"Priceless Surprises"	Mastercard	Gold
2014	One Show Entertainment	Data Visualization & Infographics	"Datagrams"	IBM	Golden Pencil
2014	Cannes Lions International Advertising Festival	Design	"Datagrams"	IBM	Silver
2014	Cannes Lions International Advertising Festival	Internet Film	"Designed by Apple- Intention"	Apple	Bronze
2014	Cannes Lions International Advertising Festival	Design	"Designed by Apple- Intention"	Apple	Gold
2014	ADC Awards	Motion, Art Direction	"Vacuum Up the Floor"	Ad Council	Merit
2014	ADC Awards	Motion Graphics	"Smarter Planet"	IBM	Silver
2014	ADC Awards	Motion Animation	"First Step"	ChildLine	Silver
2013	Lovie Awards	Animation	"First Step"	ChildLine	Gold
2013	Golden Award of Montreux	Digital/Interactive	"Metamorphosis"	Good Books	Gold
2013	CAANZ Axis Awards	Charity	"Metamorphosis"	Good Books	Finalist
2013	CAANZ Axis Awards	Copywriting	"Metamorphosis"	Good Books	Finalist
2013	One Show Entertainment	One Show Design	"Metamorphosis"	Good Books	Merit
2013	CLIO Awards	Animation	"Metamorphosis"	Good Books	Gold
2013	Internet Advertising Competition	Design	"Metamorphosis"	Good Books	Best Design Online Video
2013	ADC Awards	Designism Award	"Metamorphosis"	Good Books	Designism Award
2013	ADC Awards	Broadcast Craft Animation	"Metamorphosis"	Good Books	Gold
2013	ADC Awards	Animation	"Metamorphosis"	Good Books	Gold
2013	ADC Awards	Copywriting	"Metamorphosis"	Good Books	Silver
2013	ADC Awards	Animation	"Ginger Grouse"	Good Books	Bronze
2013	ADC Awards	Merit	"Sherwin Williams Migration"	Good Books	Merit
2013	Bass Awards	Best Explanatory Video	"First Step"	ChildLine	Gold
2013	Bass Awards	Best Commercial	"Hive"	British Gas	Silver
2013	Bass Awards	Ident/Interstitial/Bumper Category	"MTV Chameleon"	MTV World Design Studio Milan	Best Ident/Interstitial/Bumper Category
2013	YoungGuns International Award	Animation	"Metamorphosis"	Good Books	Bronze
2013	Anima Festival		"Metamorphosis"	Good Books	Official Selection
2012	Toronto Animated Arts Festival	Shorts	"Metamorphosis"	Good Books	Official Selection
2012	KLIK! Amsterdam Animation Festival	Commissioned Film	"Metamorphosis"	Good Books	Best Commissioned Film
2012	London International Awards	Animation	"Metamorphosis"	Good Books	Gold
2012	London International Awards	Web Services and Animation	"Metamorphosis"	Good Books	Shortlisted
2012	Cannes Lions International Advertising Festival	Film Craft Lions - Animation	"Metamorphosis"	Good Books	Shortlisted
2012	Soho Film Festival	Pushing Boundaries Category	"Metamorphosis"	Good Books	Pushing Boundaries Award
2011	ADC Awards	Motion	"Google Offers"	Google	Bronze
2011	ADC Awards	Motion	"F5 Opening Titles"	F5	Silver
2007	BDA North America Design Awards	On-Air, Sports, Art Direction & Design: Informational Graphics	"ESPN World Cup Show Package"	ESPN	Bronze
2006	Promax/BDA Latin America Awards	Sports Promo	"ESPN World Cup Show Open"	ESPN	Silver
2005	YoungGuns International Award	TV :30 Seconds	"G4 Anime Image Spot - Pet Fancy"	G4	Bronze
2005	YoungGuns International Award	TV :30 Seconds	"G4 Anime Image Spot - Pixelgrrl"	G4	Bronze
2005	BDA Awards	AD & Design: Image Promo	"Fuse and Gomorrah ID"	Fuse	Gold
