= Golden Reel Award for Outstanding Achievement in Sound Editing – Music Score and Musical for Episodic Short Form Broadcast Media =

Annual award to honor sound editing

- Country: United States
- Presented by: Motion Picture Sound Editors
- Currently held by: Lise Beauchesne, Yuri Gorbachow – Vikings (2020)

The Golden Reel Award for Outstanding Achievement in Sound Editing – Music Score and Musical for Episodic Short Form Broadcast Media is an annual award given by the Motion Picture Sound Editors. It honors sound editors whose work has warranted merit in the field of television; in this case, their work in the field of music editing in television. The awards title has gone through many incarnations since its inception, but its focus has been on honoring exemplary work of music editors. The term "short form" was added to the category in 2002, as long form television (over one hour) has its own separate category. The award has been given with its current title since 2018.

== Winners and nominees ==
=== 1990s ===
Year	Program	Episode(s)	Nominees	Network
1996	Best Sound Editing – Music – TV series			
1996	The Big Easy	"Don’t Shoot the Piano Player"	Fernand Bos (music editor)	USA Network
1996	Dream On	"The Spirit of 76th & Park"	Merelyn Davis (music editor)	HBO
1996	Lois & Clark: The New Adventures of Superman	"Double Jeopardy"	Lisa A. Arpino (music editor)	ABC
1996	The Outer Limits	"Inconstant Moon"	Shawn Pierce (music editor)	Showtime
1996	Sliders	"Double Jeopardy"	Fernand Bos (music editor)	Fox
1996	The X-Files	"Syzygy"	Jeff Charbonneau (music editor)	Fox
1997	Best Sound Editing – Television Episodic – Music			
1997	Fame L.A.	"Pilot"	Lisa A. Arpino (music/scoring editor)	Syndication
1997	Buffy the Vampire Slayer		Fernand Bos, Celia Weiner (music editors)	The WB
1997	Hercules: The Legendary Journeys		Philip Tallman (supervising music editor)	Syndication
1997	Stargate SG-1		Rick Chadock (music editor)	Showtime
1998
1998	The Drew Carey Show	"Drew's Dance Party Special"	Merelyn Davis (music editor)	ABC
1998	Ally McBeal		Sharyn Gersh (music editor)	Fox
1998	The X-Files		Jeff Charbonneau (music editor)	Fox
1998	Brimstone		David Bondelevitch (music editor)	Fox
1998	Buffy the Vampire Slayer		Fernand Bos (music editor)	The WB
1998	Fame L.A.		Lisa A. Arpino (music/scoring editor)	Syndication
1998	Hercules: The Legendary Journeys		Philip Tallman (supervising music editor)	Syndication
1998	Xena: Warrior Princess		Philip Tallman (supervising music editor)	Syndication
1998	Best Sound Editing – Television Mini-Series – Music			
1998	The Temptations	"Night One"	Tom Villano (music/scoring editor), Kevin Crehan (music editor)	NBC
1998	Mama Flora's Family		Michael T. Ryan (supervising music editor)	CBS
1998	A Will of Their Own		Lisa A. Arpino (music editor)	NBC
1999	Best Sound Editing – Television Episodic – Music			
1999	The Sopranos	"A Hit Is a Hit"	Kathryn Dayak (music editor), Ron Evans (re-recording music mixer)	HBO
1999	Ally McBeal	"Seeing Green"	Sharyn Gersh (music/scoring editor)	Fox
1999	Angel	"I Will Remember You"	Fernand Bos (music/scoring editor), Tim Isle (music editor)	The WB
1999	Buffy the Vampire Slayer	"The Prom"	Fernand Bos (music/scoring editor)	The WB
1999	Cold Feet	"Pilot"	David Bondelevitch (music editor)	NBC
1999	Freaks and Geeks	"Beers and Weirs"	Jonathan Karp (music editor)	NBC
1999	The Famous Jett Jackson	"What Monet Can't Buy"	Carlos Lopes (music/scoring editor)	Disney
1999	The Hoop Life	"Road Trip"	Yuri Gorbachow, Chris Jannetta (music editors)	Showtime
1999	The Outer Limits	"Better Luck Next Time"	Richard S. Kaufman, Marc S. Perlman (music editors)	Showtime

=== 2000s ===
Year	Program	Episode(s)	Nominees	Network
2000	Best Sound Editing – Television Episodic – Music			
2000	Ally McBeal	"The Musical, Almost"	Jennifer Barak, Sharyn Gersh (music editors)	Fox
2000	Bette	"The Color of Roses"	Chris Ledesma (music editor)	CBS
2000	Buffy the Vampire Slayer	"Superstar"	Fernand Bos (music/scoring editor)	The WB
2000	Queer as Folk	"Premiere"	Yuri Gorbachow (music editor)	Showtime
2000	The Sopranos	"Commendatori"	Kathryn Dayak (music editor)	HBO
2000	Undressed	"330"	Brian Bulman (music editor)	MTV
2000	Xena: Warrior Princess	"Coming Home"	Philip Tallman (supervising music editor)	Syndication
2001	Best Sound Editing in Television – Music, Episodic Live Action			
2001	Buffy the Vampire Slayer	"Once More, with Feeling"	Fernand Bos (supervising music/scoring editor), Tim Isle (music editor)	UPN
2001	Ally McBeal	"Cloudy Skies, Chance Of Parade"	Sharyn Gersh (music editor)	Fox
2001	Angel	"Carpe Noctem"	Tim Isle (music editor)	The WB
2001	Smallville	"Pilot"	Chris McGeary (music editor)	The WB
2001	The Drew Carey Show	"Drew Carey's Back-to-School Rock 'n' Roll Comedy Hour"	Merelyn Davis, Suzanne Marie Eller, Gerry Rothschild (music editors)	ABC
2001	The Sopranos	"Mr. Ruggerio's Neighborhood"	Kathryn Dayak (music editor)	HBO
2001	That's Life	"Touched by a Biker"	Lisa A. Arpino (music editor)	CBS
2001	Undressed	"The Showdown"	Brian Bulman (music editor)	MTV
2001	Xena: Warrior Princess	"Old Ares Had a Farm"	Philip Tallman (music editor)	Syndication
2002	Best Sound Editing in Television Episodic – Music			
2002	American Dreams	"Cold Snap"	Michael Dittrick, Sharyn Gersh (music editors)	NBC
2002	Angel	"Waiting in the Wings"	Tim Isle (music/scoring editor)	The WB
2002	Fastlane		Chris McGeary (music/scoring editor), Ron Finn (music editor)	Fox
2002	John Doe	"John Deux"	Allan K. Rosen, Nicholas Viterelli (music editors)	Fox
2002	Robbery Homicide Division	"Wild Ride"	Philip Tallman (music editor)	CBS
2002	Scrubs	"My Overkill"	Becca Borawski (music editor)	NBC
2002	Watching Ellie	"Tango"	Becca Borawski (music editor)	NBC
2002	Six Feet Under	"Back to the Garden"	Bruno Roussel (music editor)	HBO
2003	American Dreams	"Change a Comin'"	Mauricio J. Balvanera (supervising music editor, scoring editor)	NBC
2003	Queer as Folk	Season 3	Yuri Gorbachow, Andrew Wright (music editors)	Showtime
2003	Scrubs	"My Philosophy"	Becca Borawski (music editor)	NBC
2003	Watching Ellie	"Buskers"	Becca Borawski (music editor)	NBC
2003	Sex and the City	"Great Sexpectations"	Dan Lieberstein (supervising music editor), Missy Cohen (music editor)	HBO
2004	Sex and the City	"An American Girl In Paris (Part Deux)"	Dan Lieberstein (supervising music editor), Missy Cohen (music editor)	HBO
2004	Cold Case	"The Letter"	Melissa Deanne Ferguson (music editor)	CBS
2004	CSI: Crime Scene Investigation	"No Humans Involved"	Christine H. Luethje (music editor)	CBS
2004	Desperate Housewives	"Running to Stand Still"	Shie Rozow (music editor)	ABC
2004	Six Feet Under	"Parallel Play"	Bruno Roussel (music editor)	HBO
2004	The Sopranos	"Marco Polo"	Kathryn Dayak (music editor)	HBO
2005	Best Sound Editing in Television Short Form – Music			
2005	Medium	"The Song Remains the Same"	Robert Cotnoir (music editor)	CBS
2005	Battlestar Galactica	"Flight of the Phoenix"	Michael Baber, David Bondelevitch (music editors)	Sci Fi
2005	Cold Case	"Frank's Best"	Melissa Deanne Ferguson (music editor)	CBS
2005	CSI: Crime Scene Investigation	"Snakes"	Christine H. Luethje (music editor)	CBS
2005	Desperate Housewives	"Sorting Out the Dirty Laundry"	Shie Rozow (music editor)	ABC
2005	Everybody Hates Chris	"Everybody Hates Halloween"	Stan Jones, Joshua Winget (music editors)	UPN
2005	Six Feet Under	"Everyone's Waiting"	Bruno Roussel (music editor)	HBO
2006	Best Sound Editing in Music for Television – Short Form			
2006	CSI: Miami	"Rio"	Skye Lewin (music editor)	CBS
2006	Entourage	"One Day in the Valley"	Skye Lewin (music editor)	HBO
2006	My Name Is Earl	"Number One"	Lisa A. Arpino, Sharyn Gersh (music editors)	NBC
2006	Cold Case	"The Red and the Blue"	Melissa Deanne Ferguson (music editor)	CBS
2006	Prison Break	"Disconnect"	David Klotz (music editor)	Fox
2006	ReGenesis	"Lethargica"	Tom Third (music editor)	Science Channel
2007	Best Sound Editing – Music for Short Form Television			
2007	Scrubs	"My Musical"	Lisa A. Arpino, Becca Borawski (music editors)	NBC
2007	Criminal Minds	"True Night"	Lisa A. Arpino (music editor)	CBS
2007	Viva Laughlin	"Pilot"	Troy Hardy (music editor)	CBS
2007	Damages	"Tastes Like a Ho-Ho"	Robert Cotnoir (music editor)	FX
2007	ER	"I Don't"	Sharyn Gersh (music editor)	NBC
2007	My Name Is Earl	"Creative Writing"	Amber Funk, Sharyn Gersh (music editors)	NBC
2007	October Road	"Pilot"	Joanie Diener (music editor)	ABC
2008	Best Sound Editing – Short Form Music in Television			
2008	CSI: Miami	"Tipping Point"	Skye Lewin (supervising music editor)	CBS
2008	Prison Break	"Quiet Riot"	David Klotz (supervising music editor)	Fox
2008	CSI: Crime Scene Investigation	"Bull"	Troy Hardy (music editor)	CBS
2008	Entourage	"All Out Fall Out"	Troy Hard (supervising music editor)	HBO
2008	ReGenesis	"TB or Not TB"	Tom Third (music editor)	Science Channel
2009	Glee	"Pilot"	David Klotz (music editor)	Fox
2009	Bored to Death	"The Case of the Lonely White Dove"	Missy Cohen (music editor)	HBO
2009	Castle	"Famous Last Words"	Amber Funk (supervising music editor), Lisa A. Arpino (music editor)	ABC
2009	CSI: Crime Scene Investigation	"Mascara"	Troy Hardy (music editor)	CBS
2009	Fringe	"Night of Desirable Objects"	Paul Apelgren (music editor)	Fox
2009	The Tudors	"The Undoing of Cromwell"	Yuri Gorbachow (music editor)	Showtime

=== 2010s ===
Year	Program	Episode(s)	Nominees	Network
2010	Best Sound Editing – Short Form Music in Television			
2010	Boardwalk Empire	"Anastasia"	Annette Kudrak (music editor)	HBO
2010	CSI: Crime Scene Investigation	"Unshockable"	Troy Hardy (music editor)	CBS
2010	CSI: Miami	"L.A."	Skye Lewin (music editor)	CBS
2010	Detroit 1-8-7	"Pilot"	Lisa A. Arpino (supervising music editor); Sharyn Gersh, Mary Parker (music editors)	ABC
2010	Flashpoint	"The Other Lane"	Joe Mancuso (supervising music editor), Chris Robinson (additional music editor)	CBS
2010	Fringe	"The Box"	Paul Apelgren (music editor)	Fox
2010	Rizzoli & Isles	"When the Gun Goes Bang, Bang, Bang"	Robert Cotnoir (music editor)	TNT
2010	Best Sound Editing – Short Form Musical in Television			
2010	Glee	"The Power of Madonna"	David Klotz (music editor)	Fox
2010	Hellcats	"Back of a Car"	Michael Dittrick (supervising music editor), Chris Foster (music editor)	The CW
2010	Fringe	"Brown Betty"	Paul Apelgren (music editor)	Fox
2011	Best Sound Editing – Short Form Music in Television			
2011	Raising Hope	"Prodigy"	Sharyn Gersh (supervising music editor), Susan Ham (music editor)	Fox
2011	Camelot	"Reckoning"	Yuri Gorbachow (supervising music editor)	Starz
2011	CSI: Miami	"Crowned"	Skye Lewin (supervising music editor)	CBS
2011	Damages	"Failure Is Lonely"	Robert Cotnoir (supervising music editor)	Audience Network
2011	Fringe	"The Day We Died"	Paul Apelgren (supervising music editor)	Fox
2011	Justified	"Brother's Keeper"	Lisa A. Arpino (supervising music editor)	FX
2011	Revenge	"Pilot"	Amber Funk (supervising music editor)	ABC
2011	Best Sound Editing – Short Form Musical in Television			
2011	Grey's Anatomy	"Song Beneath the Song"	Jennifer Barak (supervising music editor); Carli Barber, Jessica Harrison (music editors)	ABC
2011	Glee	"The First Time"	David Klotz (music editor)	Fox
2011	The Playboy Club	"Pilot"	Michael Dittrick (supervising music editor); Chris Foster, Sharyn Gersh (music editors)	NBC
2012	Best Sound Editing – Short Form Music in Television			
2012	Fringe	"A Short Story About Love"	Paul Apelgren (supervising music editor)	Fox
2012	The Borgias	"The Siege at Forli"	Yuri Gorbachow (supervising music editor)	Showtime
2012	Castle	"The Blue Butterfly"	Amber Funk (supervising music editor)	ABC
2012	CSI: Crime Scene Investigation	"It Was a Very Good Year"	Troy Hardy (music editor)	CBS
2012	Person of Interest	"Firewall"	Tom Trafalski (supervising music editor)	CBS
2012	Game of Thrones	"Blackwater"	David Klotz (supervising music editor)	HBO
2012	Best Sound Editing – Short Form Musical in Television			
2012	Smash	"Hell on Earth"	Dan Evans Farkas (supervising music editor); Robert Cotnoir, Annette Kudrak (additional music editors)	NBC
2012	Glee	"The New Rachel"	David Klotz (supervising music editor)	Fox
2012	Smash	"Pilot"	Joanie Diener (supervising music editor)	NBC
2013	Best Sound Editing – Short Form Music in Television			
2013	Game of Thrones	"The Rains of Castamere"	David Klotz (supervising music editor)	HBO
2013	Agents of S.H.I.E.L.D.	"Pilot"	Lodge Worster (music editor)	ABC
2013	Arrested Development	"Flight of the Phoenix"	Jason Tregoe Newman (supervising music editor)	Netflix
2013	Borgia	"The Time of Sweet Desires"	Robert Cotnoir (supervising music editor); David Menke, Cecile Tournesac (music editor); Antoine Roux (scoring editor)	Netflix
2013	CSI: Crime Scene Investigation	"Skin in the Game"	Troy Hardy (music editor)	CBS
2013	The Good Wife	"Death of a Client"	Sharyn Gersh (music editor)	CBS
2013	Hostages	"Invisible Leash"	Skye Lewin (music editor)	CBS
2013	Best Sound Editing – Short Form Musical in Television			
2013	Peg + Cat	"The Beethoven Problem"	Steven Rebollido (supervising music editor); J. Walter Hawkes, Dan Mennella (music editor)	PBS Kids
2013	Glee	"Tina in the Sky with Diamonds"	David Klotz (supervising music editor)	Fox
2013	Nashville	"Tomorrow Never Comes"	Jen Monnar (supervising music editor); Sean Alexander, Greg Vines (music editors); Michael Poole (music mixer)	ABC
2013	The Neighbors	"Sing Like a Larry Bird"	Chris Foster (supervising music editor)	ABC
2013	Smash	"Musical Chairs"	Robert Cotnoir, Dan Evans Farkas (music editors)	NBC
2014	Best Sound Editing – Short Form Music in Television			
2014	Almost Human	"Simon Says"	Warren Brown (music editor)	Fox
2014	Fargo	"The Crocodile's Dilemma"	Skye Lewin (supervising music editor)	FX
2014	Banshee	"The Thunder Man"	Skye Lewin (supervising music editor)	Cinemax
2014	Borgia	"1507"	Robert Cotnoir (music editor)	Netflix
2014	House of Cards	"Chapter 14"	Jonathon Stevens (supervising music editor), Marie Ebbing (music editor)	Netflix
2014	American Horror Story: Freak Show	"Monsters Among Us"	David Klotz (supervising music editor)	FX
2014	Game of Thrones	"The Watchers on the Wall"	David Klotz (supervising music editor)	HBO
2014	Gotham	"Lovecraft"	Ashley Revell (supervising music editor)	Fox
2015	Best Sound Editing – Short Form Music in Television			
2015	House of Cards	"Chapter 33"	Jonathon Stevens (supervising music editor), Marie Ebbing (music editor)	Netflix
2015	American Horror Story: Hotel	"Checking In"	David Klotz (supervising music editor)	FX
2015	Bates Motel	"Norma Louise"	Michael T. Ryan (music editor)	A&E
2015	Game of Thrones	"Hardhome"	David Klotz (supervising music editor)	HBO
2015	Jane the Virgin	"Chapter Twenty-Three"	Susan Ham (supervising music editor), Sharyn Gersh (music editor)	The CW
2015	Mozart in the Jungle	"Touché Maestro, Touché"	Jason Tregoe Newman (supervising music editor), Bryant J. Fuhrmann (music editor)	Amazon
2015	Mr. Robot	"eps1.0_hellofriend.mov"	Ben Zales (music editor)	USA
2015	The Slap	"Ritchie"	Robert Cotnoir (music editor)	NBC
2015	Best Sound Editing – Short Form Musical in Television			
2015	Empire	"Die But Once"	Joshua Winget (music editor)	Fox
2015	Galavant	"Comedy Gold"	Christopher Brooks (supervising music editor); Chris Foster, Dave Jewerén Moore (music editors)	ABC
2015	Nashville	"How Can I Help You Say Goodbye"	Jaclyn Newman Dorn (supervising music editor), Sean Alexander (music editors)	ABC
2015	Wet Hot American Summer: First Day of Camp		Emily C. Kwong (music editor)	Netflix
2015	Peg + Cat	"The Scrap of Map Problem"	Steven Rebollido (supervising music editor); J. Walter Hawkes, Dan Mennella (music editor)	PBS Kids
2016	Best Sound Editing – Short Form Music in Television			
2016	Stranger Things	"Chapter Three: Holly, Jolly"	David Klotz (music editor)	Netflix
2016	Animal Kingdom	"What Have You Done?"	Troy Hardy (music editor)	TNT
2016	Arrow	"What We Leave Behind"	Shie Rozow (music editor)	The CW
2016	Game of Thrones	"Battle of the Bastards"	David Klotz (music editor)	HBO
2016	Just Add Magic	"Just Add Pluots Part 2"	Shie Rozow (music editor)	Amazon
2016	Lethal Weapon	"Pilot"	Chris McGeary (supervising music editor), Jenny Leite (music editor)	Fox
2016	Luke Cage	"Soliloquy of Chaos"	Michael Brake (music editor)	Netflix
2016	Quantico	"Lipstick"	Robert Cotnoir (music editor)	ABC
2016	Best Sound Editing – Short Form Musical in Television			
2016	The Get Down	"Raise Your Words, Not Your Voice"	Jamieson Shaw (music editor)	Netflix
2016	Mozart in the Jungle	"Now I Will Sing"	Jason Tregoe Newman (supervising music editor), Bryant J. Fuhrmann (music editor)	Amazon
2016	Crazy Ex-Girlfriend	"When Will Josh See How Cool I Am?"	Moira Marquis (supervising music editor); Jillinda Palmer (music editor)	The CW
2016	Nashville	"Didn't Expect It to Go Down This Way"	Jaclyn Newman Dorn (supervising music editor), Sean Alexander (music editor)	ABC
2016	Roadies	"The Load Out"	Jennifer Barak (music editor)	Showtime
2017	Outstanding Achievement in Sound Editing – Music Score and Musical for Episodic Short Form Broadcast Media			
2017	Stranger Things	"Chapter Eight: The Mind Flayer"	David Klotz (music editor)	Netflix
2017	Game of Thrones	"Beyond the Wall"	David Klotz (music editor)	HBO
2017	The Leftovers	"It's a Matt, Matt, Matt, Matt World"	Amber Funk (supervising music editor)	HBO
2017	The Handmaid's Tale	"Offred"	Yuri Gorbachow (supervising music editor), Lise Beauchesne (music editor)	Hulu
2017	Dark	"Secrets"	Lewis Morison (music editor)	Netflix
2017	The Get Down	"Unfold Your Own Myth"	Jamieson Shaw (supervising music editor), Jordan L. Ross (music editor)	Netflix
2017	Mr. Robot	"eps3.4_runtime-error.r00"	Ben Zales (music editor)	USA
2017	Twin Peaks	"Part 8"	David Lynch (sound designer), Dean Hurley (music/sound editor)	Showtime
2018	American Horror Story: Apocalypse	"The End"	David Klotz (music editor)	FX
2018	Vikings	"Moments of Vision"	Yuri Gorbachow (supervising music editor), Lise Beauchesne (music editor)	History
2018	The Alienist	"A Fruitful Partnership"	Andrew Glen (supervising music editor); Fiona Cruickshank, Alistair Hawkins (music editors)	TNT
2018	The Americans	"Harvest"	Tass Filipos (music editor)	FX
2018	Fortitude	"Episode 4"	Lewis Morison (music editor)	Sky Atlantic
2018	Homecoming	"Stop"	Ben Zales (music editor)	Amazon
2018	Maniac	"Windmills"	Shari Johanson (music editor)	Netflix
2018	McMafia	"Episode 4"	Gerard McCann (supervising music editor), Stuart Morton (music editor)	AMC
2018	One Strange Rock	"Home"	Ben Smithers (music editor)	Nat Geo
2019	Wu-Tang: An American Saga	"All In Together Now"	Shie Rozow (music editor)	Hulu
2019	Daybreak	"Canta Tu Vida"	Eduardo Ponsdomenech (supervising music editor), Christopher Kaller (music editor)	Netflix
2019	Mr. Robot	"405 Method Not Allowed"	Ben Zales (music editor)	USA
2019	Catch-22	"Episode 1"	Michael Alexander (supervising music editor)	Hulu
2019	Swamp Thing	"The Anatomy Lesson"	Matthew Llewellyn (music editor)	DC Universe
2019	This Is Us	"Strangers"	Chris Foster (supervising music editor)	NBC
2019	Tom Clancy's Jack Ryan	"Persona Non Grata"	Alex Levy, Eric Wegener (music editors)	Amazon
2019	Vikings	"What Happens in the Cave"	Yuri Gorbachow (supervising music editor), Lise Beauchesne (music editor)	History

=== 2020s ===
Year	Program	Episode(s)	Nominees	Network
2020	Vikings	"The Best Laid Plans"	Lise Beauchesne, Yuri Gorbachow (music editors)	Amazon
2020	The Alienist	"Belly of the Beast"	Ali Hawkins (supervising music editor)	TNT
2020	Snowpiercer	"Trouble Comes Sideways"	Michael Baber, Alex Heller (music editors)	TNT
2020	Hollywood	"Hooray for Hollywood"	David Klotz (supervising music editor)	Netflix
2020	Selena: The Series	"Fideo"	Max Cremona (music editor)	Netflix
2020	The Umbrella Academy	"Valhalla"	Jen Malone (supervising music editor), Lodge Worster (music editor)	Netflix
2020	Zoey's Extraordinary Playlist	"Pilot"	Jaclyn Newman Dorn (supervising music editor)	NBC
2021	Not awarded			
2022	Outstanding Achievement in Music Editing – Broadcast Short Form			
2022	Love, Death + Robots	"Night of the Mini Dead"	Jeff Charbonneau (music editor)	Netflix
2022	Russian Doll	"Matryoshka"	Georgie Ramsland (music editor)	Netflix
2022	Pitch Perfect: Bumper in Berlin	"Torschlusspanik"	Andres Locsey (music editor)	Peacock
2022	She-Hulk: Attorney at Law	"Is This Not Real Magic?"	Mary Parker, Leah Dennis, Zak Millman (music editors); Anele Onyekwere (supervising music editor)	Disney+
