= Claudine Griggs =

American author

- Born: July 27, 1953 (age 73)
- Occupations: Writer; educator
- Writing career
- Genres: Non-fiction, Speculative fiction, Science fiction
- Notable works: Passage Through Trinidad: Journal of a Surgical Sex Change, "Helping Hand"
- Website: claudinegriggs.com

Claudine Griggs (born July 27, 1953) is an American author and transgender woman.

Griggs has taught writing professionally for many years at various universities across the United States. She ran Rhode Island College's Writing Center from 2009 to 2019. While currently semi-retired, she now works part-time as a writing specialist at Texas A&M University's Bush School of Government & Public Service.

Griggs first came out as transgender in 1974. In 1991, at age 37, she underwent gender-affirming surgery with Dr. Stanley Biber in Trinidad, Colorado. She kept a detailed, clinical and darkly humorous journal of the experience that later became her first book, 1995's Passage Through Trinidad: Journal of a Surgical Sex Change. This was followed by 1998's S/he: Changing Sex and Changing Clothes, in which Griggs interviewed numerous other transgender people to examine "the pressures and motivations to conform to expected gender roles, and the ways in which these are affected by social, educational, and professional status."

In 2004, her first book was republished in an expanded edition under the alternative title Journal of a Sex Change: Passage Through Trinidad. In 2021, the story of her surgery was featured in the book Going to Trinidad: A Doctor, a Colorado Town and Stories from an Unlikely Gender Crossroads by Martin J. Smith.

From 2009 onwards, Griggs has mostly written science fiction and speculative fiction. In 2019, her short story "Helping Hand" was adapted into an episode of the Netflix series Love, Death and Robots. Her first novel, the crime thriller Don't Ask, Don't Tell, was published in 2020. A short story collection entitled Firestorm was published in 2022, and her second novel Dwarf Days followed in 2024.
