= Love, Death & Robots =

Adult animated anthology television series

- Genre: Adult animation; Science fantasy; Black comedy; Horror; Anthology
- Created by: Tim Miller
- Original language: English
- No. of seasons: 4
- No. of episodes: 45 (list of episodes)

Production
- Executive producers: David Fincher; Tim Miller; Jennifer Miller; Joshua Donen
- Running time: 6–21 minutes
- Production company: Blur Studio

Original release
- Network: Netflix
- Release: March 15, 2019 – May 15, 2025

Love, Death & Robots (stylized as LOVE DEATH + ROBOTS; represented in emoji form as ❤️❌🤖) is an adult animated anthology web series created by Tim Miller for Netflix. Although the series is produced by Blur Studio, its individual episodes are drawn from the work of an international variety of animation studios. The animations span the genres of comedy, horror, science fiction, and fantasy. Each episode is connected to one or more of the three titular concepts. Miller serves as the showrunner and producer alongside Joshua Donen, David Fincher, and Jennifer Miller. Most episodes are written by Philip Gelatt and are adaptations of short stories.

The series evolved from an attempt by Fincher and Miller to produce a feature-length movie reboot of Heavy Metal. The planned anthology film languished in development hell for eleven years due to difficulties with securing the rights to the title, as well as the lack of studios willing to fund the project. Eventually, Netflix became interested in the idea and agreed to distribute it as a television series.

The first season was released on March 15, 2019; the second on May 14, 2021; the third on May 20, 2022; and the fourth on May 15, 2025. The show has received positive reviews from critics who praise its voice acting, sound design, and unique approach of using a variety of animation styles and genres. It won several accolades from the Primetime Creative Arts Emmy Awards.

== Premise ==
The animated series consists of a collection of short films, produced by different casts and crews. However, some episodes have some overlap in certain crew members. The series title refers to each episode's thematic connection to one or more of the three titular subjects.

Beyond the themes and genres, there are no story connections between the shorts with the exception of Season 1's "Three Robots", which has a sequel (Season 3's "Three Robots: Exit Strategies").

== Episodes ==
Volume	Episodes	Originally released
1	18	March 15, 2019
2	8	May 14, 2021
3	9	May 20, 2022
4	10	May 15, 2025

== Production ==
=== Development ===
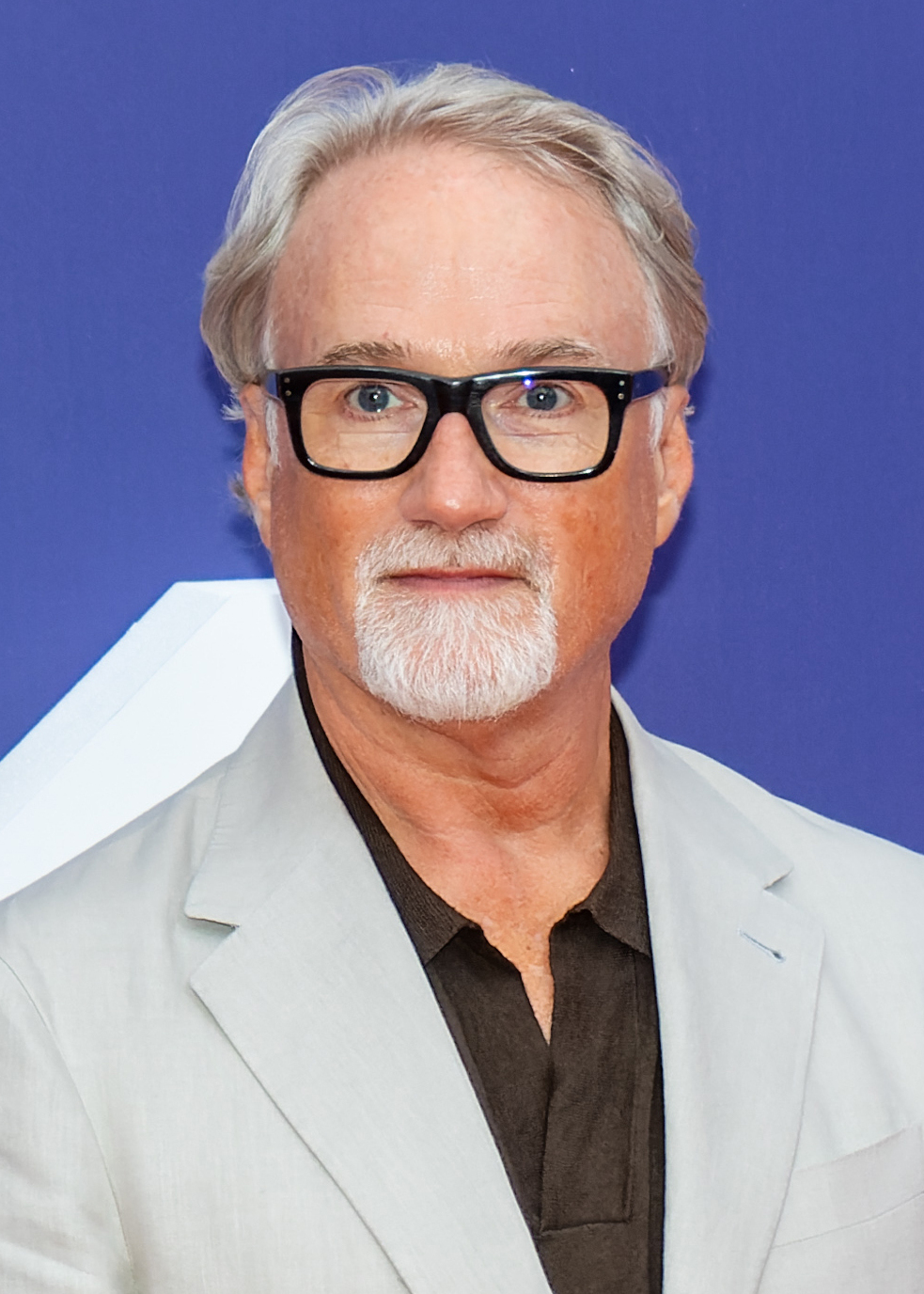
David Fincher serves as executive producer for the series.

The project evolved from a late 2000s meeting in which David Fincher and Tim Miller decided to remake the 1981 film Heavy Metal. Announced in 2008, the project was to be produced by Paramount Pictures but Fincher and Miller had trouble getting the funding necessary for the project. The project was originally intended to be an anthology film with a budget of around $50 million, with several involved directors each handling different short segments and Blur Studio providing the animation. The directors' lineup included Miller, Fincher, James Cameron, Zack Snyder, Kevin Eastman, Gore Verbinski, Guillermo del Toro, Mark Osborne, Jeff Fowler, and Rob Zombie. The film was expected to have either eight or nine segments and be rated R like the original Heavy Metal film. On July 14, 2008, production for the film was halted due to Paramount Pictures dropping the project. The film was switched to Sony division Columbia Pictures, due to an ongoing conflict between the former studio and Fincher during the production of The Curious Case of Benjamin Button. In 2009, Eastman revealed that he reunited with Jack Black to make a comedic segment for the film. The former also revealed that Fincher and Cameron were originally intended to serve as executive producers of the film.

The proposed movie eventually fell into development hell, as no companies were interested in distributing or producing the remake after Paramount Pictures abandoned it. The proposed movie idea was dropped because several studios considered it "too risqué for mainstream audiences." Miller commented that: "David really believes in the project. It's just a matter of time."

In July 2011, it was announced at San Diego Comic-Con that filmmaker Robert Rodriguez purchased the film rights to Heavy Metal and planned to develop a remake at the newly founded Quick Draw Studios. On March 11, 2014, after creating his own television network, El Rey, Rodriguez decided instead to develop the film as a television series. However, Eastman revealed that he sold Heavy Metal and that the deal with Rodriguez was unlikely to stay standing.

Netflix took interest in the idea and decided to greenlight the series: "Well, David Fincher and I had tried to get a Heavy Metal film made for years and years. I mean, hundreds of meetings. The original movie came out in [1981] and it was very inspirational to a lot of animators who wanted to do adult animation. So when I met David, we wanted to do something together and we said, 'What about doing a new Heavy Metal film?' because he was an animation fan, but the world just was not ready for it at the time. But in the ten years that we did meetings and tried to get the project going, the world came around to see adult animation as viable, and Netflix was the one that was willing to take a chance. And so here we are." The studio gave Fincher and Miller a total freedom to allow them to "breathe life into their vision". The series would be taking the name Love, Death & Robots instead. It would consist of 18 episodes ranging from 5 to 15 minutes including a wide range of animation styles from traditional 2D animation to photo-real 3D CGI. While working in Netflix for the series House of Cards and Mindhunter, Fincher discussed his wish to break free of the half-hour and hour-long formats for the animated series: "We have to get rid of the 22-minute [length of a half-hour show with commercials] and 48-minute [length of an hour-long show with commercials] because there's this Pavlovian response to this segmentation that to me seems anathema to storytelling. You want the story to be as long as it needs to be to be at maximum impact or entertainment value proposition."

According to Miller, after the release of Deadpool, Fincher called him saying "OK, so we're going to use your newfound popularity to get our anthology movie made," only to eventually decide, "...let's just take it to Netflix, because they'll let us do whatever we want."

On August 12, 2022, Netflix renewed the series for a fourth season.

=== Writing ===
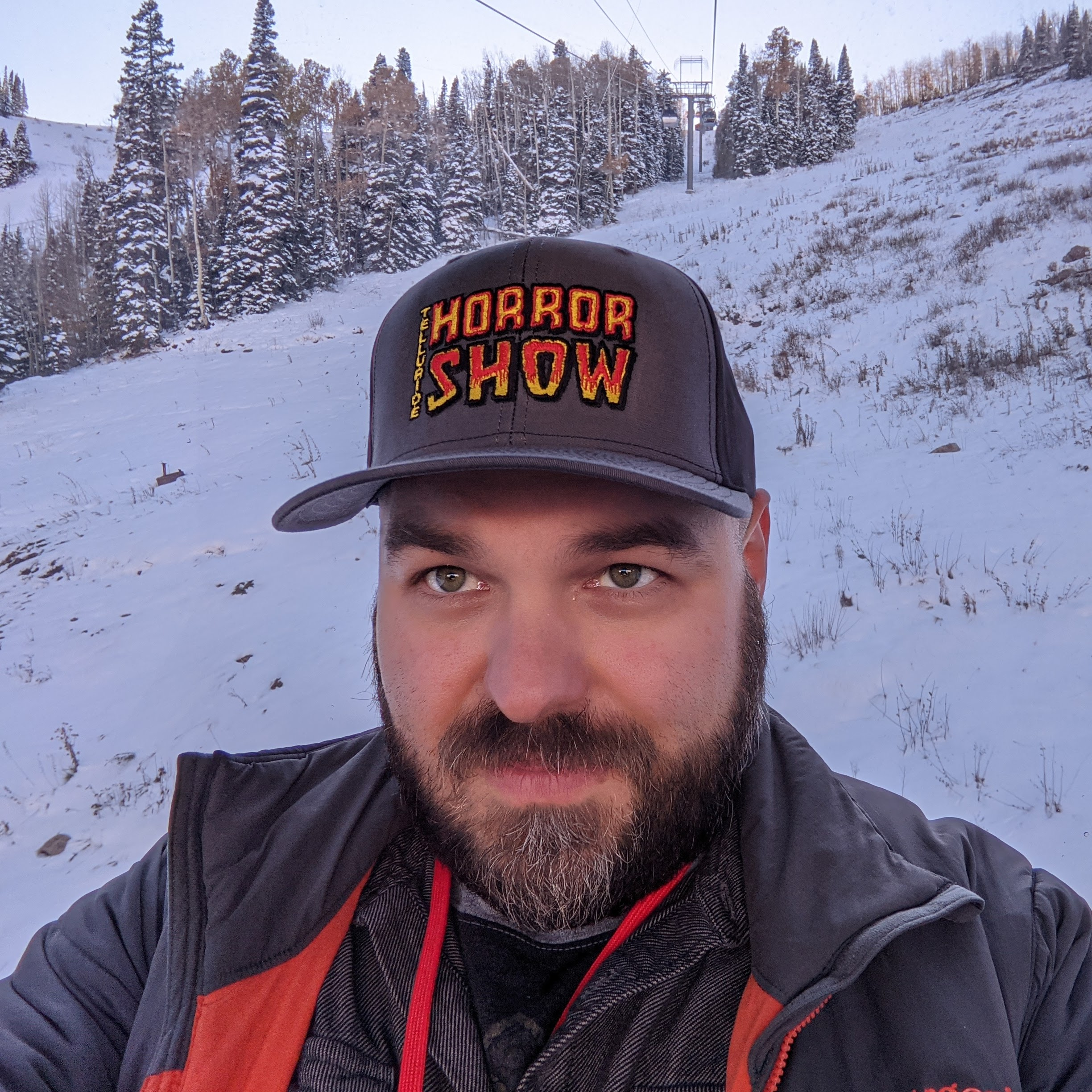
Philip Gelatt wrote more of the series' episodes than any other person, particularly episodes that are adapted from short stories.

Screenwriters include co-creator Miller and Philip Gelatt (screenwriter of the film Europa Report), the latter of whom wrote more of the series' episodes than anyone. Many of the short films are short story adaptations, including sixteen of the eighteen in the first season (most of which are adapted by Gelatt). Initially this was not planned, with the duo envisioning a variety of methods by which they would have developed the series. Miller originally suggested a longer list of stories that he wanted to adapt. Miller primarily wrote outlines and drafts for each short and allowed for scripts to be changed as studios saw fit in order to aid the production. Authors who have had their work adapted include Harlan Ellison, J. G. Ballard, Alastair Reynolds, Joe R. Lansdale, Neal Asher, Michael Swanwick, and John Scalzi, who also adapted several of his stories into scripts himself (except some of which are adapted by Gelatt). Miller in an interview revealed that they are free to choose the story they want, but admits wanting to get the storyline of the episode right in order to give them their original flash of brilliance to a story that would not exist if it were not for the authors having ideas. The third season includes more varied screenwriters with Philip Gelatt only writing four episodes of nine. Filmmaker Jennifer Yuh Nelson and Miller revealed that they chose to involve more screenwriters due to busying schedules of Gelatt. However, they also revealed that the writers managed to keep the episodes original to the short stories to make them more like them and ensure that they work.

For the production of the second season, Miller revealed that they changed supervisors to offer a different perspective from the previous season. When Nelson was recruited she convinced the crew including Miller to introduce stories that the latter never thought that would be introduced for the show. To bring the different nature of each episode for the series, the crew worked with different creators and companies to get the different styles for each episode. Unlike the first season that contained 18 episodes, the second season is shorter than the previous one having only released eight episodes. Miller confessed that it was originally meant to get the same amount of episodes like the previous one, however Netflix asked them to shorten it in order to release it sooner in the streaming service, with the remaining episodes being released as part of the third season. Another factor to consider is the COVID-19 pandemic that affected the production of the show which caused the production to be suspended, which would lead the crew to take the decision of making the second season shorter in order to avoid more delays.

=== Animation ===
While Blur Studio is in charge of producing the series, it also was in charge of animating a few episodes for the show. As each episode has a different animation style, the visual effect supervisor for the series revealed that they contacted different studios: "We've been competing against some of these companies for years and admire them greatly. It was thrilling to bring everyone together and let them apply their unique visions to these shorts. It was here where all the creative freedom really paid off." The episodes produced by Blur Studio contain a 3D video game animation style, while also approaching the hand painted one. Tim Miller revealed that for the each different stories, the crew approached certain studios for the specific stories to ensure what episode fit better with the animation style.

For the remaining thirteen episodes, several animation studios were involved – Unit Image, Red Dog Culture House, Able & Baker, Axis Studios, Platige Image, Atomic Fiction, Sony Pictures Imageworks, Passion Animation Studios, Elena Volk's Independent Studio, Blow Studio, Pinkman.TV, Studio La Cachette, Sun Creature Studio, and Digic Pictures. For the episode of "The Witness", the director of the episode Alberto Mielgo used a "never-before-seen aesthetic" to capture the realistic vibe, which lead to several discussions over if it was used motion capture for the streets and building. However, Mielgo confirmed that it was all animated and that it was not easy to do as they needed to keep the characters moving from scratch by using a software that was not used before.

For the following seasons, some of the returning studios besides Blur Studio were Passion Animation Studios, Pinkman.TV, Unit Image, Axis Studios, Blow Studio, and Sony Pictures Imageworks. The series also involved new studios with Atoll Studio and Blinkink joining the second season, while Polygon Pictures, Buck, and Titmouse joined the third season.

Animation studio	Country of origin	No. of episodes produced
The Aaron Sims Company	United States	1
Able & Baker	Spain	1
AGBO	United States	1
Atoll Studio	France	1
Atomic Fiction	United States	1
Axis Studios	Scotland	3
Blinkink	England	1
Blow Studio	Spain	3
Blur Studio (main)	United States	11
Buck	United States	2
Digic Pictures	Hungary	2
Elena Volk's Independent Studio	Russia	1
Luma Pictures	United States	1
Passion Animation Studios	England	3
Pinkman.TV	Spain	2
Platige Image	Poland	1
Polygon Pictures	Japan	2
Red Dog Culture House	South Korea	1
Sony Pictures Imageworks	Canada	2
Studio La Cachette	France	1
Sun Creature Studio	Denmark	1
Titmouse	United States	2
Unit Image	France	2

== Release ==
Netflix released the first trailer for the series on February 14, 2019; the trailer featured Matt Green's industrial hardcore remix of AMBASSADOR21's "We Are Legion". The episodes of the first volume are displayed in different orders to different users, which differ from how most shows are displayed on the service. The first season consisting of eighteen standalone episodes, was released worldwide on Netflix on March 15, 2019. In response to an accusation that the episode order was based on the streaming company's perception of a user's sexual orientation, Netflix responded that there were four unique episode orders, released to users at random. On April 19, 2021, Netflix released the teaser trailer for the second season; it featured Colin Stetson's track "Reborn" from the Hereditary film soundtrack. The eight episodes of the second season were released on May 14, 2021; four days earlier Netflix released a 45-second long Red Band trailer of the series. On April 19, 2022, a teaser trailer for the third season was released which featured footage from previous seasons of the series as well as footage from other The Crown and The Queen's Gambit also distributed by Netflix. Another two trailers were released on May which featured footage from the shorts for the upcoming season and confirmed that there would be nine episodes instead of eight. The official trailer was released on May 9, 2022, while the final trailer was released just four days before the volume 3 premiere. On May 18, 2022, Netflix released the premiere episode "Three Robots: Exit Strategies" for free on their YouTube channel while the entire third season was released on May 20. The fourth season premiered on May 15, 2025.

== Reception ==
=== Volume I ===
For the first volume, review aggregator Rotten Tomatoes compiled 43 critic reviews and identified 77% as positive, with an average rating of 7.03/10. The website's critical consensus reads, "This animated anthology has enough creative Death to satisfy cyberpunk aficionados who Love their Robots to have some Heavy Metal influence, but the series' lofty ambitions are often undercut by a preoccupation with gore and titillation." Metacritic sampled 4 reviews from mainstream critics and calculated a weighted average score of 65/100, indicating "generally favorable reviews".

Writing in The Daily Beast, Nick Schager described the series as "Black Mirror for the ADD-addled video game crowd" and praised the show for its "diverse affair rife with violence, humor, and a healthy dose of sensuality". Peter Rubin of Wired magazine praised the show and its boundary-pushing nature, saying that "sometimes, you just want to see Adolf Hitler suffocated by a giant mound of gelatin". Rubin further voiced frustration with the seemingly "endless parade of stoic supermen and the women who deceive or escape them", noting that at times it seems as though Fincher and Miller have aimed the show at a "particularly retrograde subset of genre fans". In a more negative review, Ben Travers of IndieWire described the episodes as "too often hyper-masculine and half-baked" and gave the series a C grade, though the review was based on only 6 of the 18 episodes. Abby Robinson of Digital Spy called the series problematic in its portrayal of women as primarily sexual objects and victims of trauma, labeling it as "firmly rooted in the past".

=== Volume II ===
The second volume has an 81% rating from 16 reviews on Rotten Tomatoes, with an average rating of 6.90/10. The website's critical consensus reads, "The quality of shorts can be uneven, but Love, Death + Robots' sophomore volume is a well-oiled machine of creativity." Matt Fowler of IGN said the season needed a higher episode count, "even though its first season had too many. A shorter catalog is probably best here since this year's batch of stories features some repeating themes. That being said, the series continues to be an enjoyable thought-provoking buffet of animated wonders and wickedness". Steve Green of IndieWire praised the season's quality though he was critical over the shorter amount of episodes, "The show remains an anthology, but look hard enough and you'll see at least one hint that these shorts might not be occupying wholly distinct universes after all." Petrana Radulovic from Polygon called the second season less violent and more mature than its predecessor, "That isn't the only difference between seasons, however. Objectively, the shorts in volume 2 are less edgy and violent, trading in gratuitous nudity and gore for poignant storytelling. It's more mature this time around and less messed-up, which makes for stronger viewing."

=== Volume III ===
The third volume holds a 100% rating from 18 reviews on Rotten Tomatoes, with an average rating of 8.20/10, the website's critical consensus stating, "A concise collection of memorable cybernetic fables, Love, Death + Robots' third installment is its most well-balanced yet." Writing for The Verge, Andrew Webster called volume III "arguably the strongest collection yet" praising the stories and various animation styles used in each short. Johhny Loftus from Decider praised the season for its visuals and exploration of real life topics, "Love, Death & Robots keeps the run time tight and visual pizzazz expansive as it explores its titular topics in relation to society and ourselves. And oh yeah, swear words." Tara Bennet from IGN considered that the stories for each episode weren't strong enough as the craftmanship though she praised the animation, "Love, Death and Robots Vol. 3 is the least accessible of the three seasons, especially if you aren't interested in an overabundance of gory violence. While there are some impressive examples of CG animation, the craftsmanship is mostly stronger than the stories featured."

=== Volume IV ===
For the fourth volume, Rotten Tomatoes reported a 100% approval rating based on 13 reviews.

=== Accolades ===
Year	Award	Category	Nominee(s)	Result	Ref.
2019	British Academy Scotland Awards	Best Animation	Jon Yeo and Caleb Bouchard (Episode: "Helping Hand")	Won	
2019	Primetime Creative Arts Emmy Awards	Outstanding Short Form Animated Program	David Fincher, Tim Miller, Jennifer Miller, Joshua Donen, Victoria Howard, Gennie Rim, Alberto Mielgo, and Gabriele Pennacchioli (for "The Witness")	Won	
2019	Primetime Creative Arts Emmy Awards	Outstanding Individual Achievement in Animation (Juried)	Jun-ho Kim (background designer) (for "Good Hunting")	Won	
2019	Primetime Creative Arts Emmy Awards	Outstanding Individual Achievement in Animation (Juried)	Alberto Mielgo (production designer) (for "The Witness")	Won	
2019	Primetime Creative Arts Emmy Awards	Outstanding Individual Achievement in Animation (Juried)	David Pate (character animator) (for "The Witness")	Won	
2019	Primetime Creative Arts Emmy Awards	Outstanding Individual Achievement in Animation (Juried)	Owen Sullivan (storyboard artist) (for "Sucker of Souls")	Won	
2019	Primetime Creative Arts Emmy Awards	Outstanding Sound Editing for a Comedy or Drama Series (Half-Hour) and Animation	Brad North, Craig Henighan, Jordan Wilby, Troy Prehmus, Jeff Charbonneau, Alicia Stevenson, and Dawn Lunsford (for "The Secret War")	Nominated	
2020	Annie Awards	Outstanding Achievement in Animated Effects in an Animated Television/Media Production	Viktor Németh, Szabolcs Illés, Ádám Sipos, and Vladimir Zhovna (for "The Secret War")	Won	
2020	Annie Awards	Outstanding Achievement in Music in an Animated Television/Media Production	Rob Cairns (for "Sonnie's Edge")	Won	
2020	Annie Awards	Outstanding Achievement in Production Design in an Animated Television/Broadcast Production	Alberto Mielgo (for "The Witness")	Won	
2020	Annie Awards	Outstanding Achievement in Editorial in an Animated Television/Broadcast Production	Bo Juhl, Stacy Auckland, and Valerian Zamel (for "Alternate Histories")	Won	
2021	Annie Awards	Best General Audience Animated Television/Broadcast Production	"Ice"	Nominated	
2021	Annie Awards	Outstanding Achievement for Character Animation in an Animated Television / Broadcast Production	Dan Gill (for "All Through the House")	Nominated	
2021	Annie Awards	Outstanding Achievement for Editorial in an Animated Television / Broadcast Production	Julian Clarke, Matt Mariska, Valerian Zamel, Brian Swanson, and Ky Kenyon (for "Pop Squad")	Nominated	
2021	Annie Awards	Outstanding Achievement for Production Design in an Animated Television / Broadcast Production	Robert Valley (for "Ice")	Nominated	
2021	Annie Awards	Outstanding Achievement for Storyboarding in an Animated Television / Broadcast Production	Jennifer Yuh Nelson (for "Pop Squad")	Nominated	
2021	Primetime Creative Arts Emmy Awards	Outstanding Short Form Animated Program	David Fincher, Tim Miller, Jennifer Miller, Joshua Donen, Andrew Ruhemann, Cara Speller, Victoria Howard, Philip Gelatt, Robert Valley, and Jennifer Yuh Nelson (for "Ice")	Won	
2021	Primetime Creative Arts Emmy Awards	Outstanding Individual Achievement in Animation (Juried)	Patricio Betteo (background artist) (for "Ice")	Won	
2021	Primetime Creative Arts Emmy Awards	Outstanding Individual Achievement in Animation (Juried)	Dan Gill (stop motion animator) (for "All Through the House")	Won	
2021	Primetime Creative Arts Emmy Awards	Outstanding Individual Achievement in Animation (Juried)	Laurent Nicolas (character designer) (for "Automated Customer Service")	Won	
2021	Primetime Creative Arts Emmy Awards	Outstanding Individual Achievement in Animation (Juried)	Robert Valley (production designer) (for "Ice")	Won	
2021	Primetime Creative Arts Emmy Awards	Outstanding Sound Editing for a Comedy or Drama Series (Half-Hour) and Animation	Brad North, Craig Henighan, Dawn Lunsford, Jeff Charbonneau, and Alicia Stevens (for "Snow in the Desert")	Won	
2022	Golden Reel Awards	Outstanding Achievement in Sound Editing – Animation Series or Short	Brad North, Craig Henighan, Jeff Gross, Dawn Lunsford, Alicia Stevens, and Jeff Charbonneau (for "Snow in the Desert")	Won	
2022	Hollywood Critics Association TV Awards	Best Short Form Animation Series	Love, Death & Robots	Won	
2022	Primetime Creative Arts Emmy Awards	Outstanding Short Form Animated Program	David Fincher, Tim Miller, Jennifer Miller, Joshua Donen, Sergio Jimenez, Victoria Howard, Jennifer Yuh Nelson, and Alberto Mielgo (for "Jibaro")	Won	
2022	Primetime Creative Arts Emmy Awards	Outstanding Individual Achievement in Animation (Juried)	Alberto Mielgo (character designer) (for "Jibaro")	Won	
2022	Primetime Creative Arts Emmy Awards	Outstanding Sound Editing for a Comedy or Drama Series (Half-Hour) and Animation	Brad North, Craig Henighan, Anthony Zeller, Jeff Charbonneau, Zane Bruce, and Lindsay Pepper (for "In Vaulted Halls Entombed")	Nominated	
2022	Visual Effects Society Awards	Outstanding Animated Character in an Episode or Real-Time Project	Maxime Luere, Zoé Pelegrin-Bomel, Laura Guerreiro, and Florent Duport (for "Snow in the Desert" – Hirald)	Nominated	
2022	Artios Awards	Outstanding Achievement in Casting – Short Form Series	Ivy Isenberg, Natasha Vincent	Nominated	
2023	Golden Reel Awards	Outstanding Achievement in Sound Editing – Broadcast Animation	Brad North, Antony Zeller, Zane Bruce, and Lindsay Pepper (for "In Vaulted Halls Entombed")	Won	
2023	Golden Reel Awards	Outstanding Achievement in Music Editing – Broadcast Short Form	Jeff Charbonneau (for "Night of the Mini Dead")	Nominated	
2023	Producers Guild of America Awards	Best Short-Form Program	Love, Death & Robots	Nominated	
2023	Visual Effects Society Awards	Outstanding Compositing and Lighting in an Episode	Tim Emeis, José Maximiano, Renaud Tissandié, and Nacere Guerouaf (for "Night of the Mini Dead")	Won	
2023	Annie Awards	Outstanding Achievement for Animated Effects in an Animated Television/Broadcast Production	Kirby Miller, Igor Zanic, Joseph H. Coleman, Steven Dupuy, and Josh Schwartz (for "Bad Traveling")	Won	
2023	Annie Awards	Outstanding Achievement for Character Design in an Animated Television / Broadcast Production	Alberto Mielgo (for "Jibaro")	Won	
2023	Annie Awards	Outstanding Achievement for Music in an Animated Television / Broadcast Production	Rob Cairns (for "The Very Pulse of the Machine")	Nominated	
2023	Annie Awards	Outstanding Achievement for Storyboarding in an Animated Television / Broadcast Production	Emily Dean (for "The Very Pulse of the Machine")	Won	
2023	Annie Awards	Outstanding Achievement for Writing in an Animated Television / Broadcast Production	Andrew Kevin Walker (for "Bad Traveling")	Won	
2025	Primetime Creative Arts Emmy Awards	Outstanding Animated Program	David Fincher, Tim Miller, Jennifer Miller, Joshua Donen, Al Shier, Victoria Howard, Samantha Brainerd, Meg Darcy, Joe Abercrombie, Todd Wilbur, and Jennifer Yuh Nelson, (for "Spider Rose")	Nominated	
2025	Primetime Creative Arts Emmy Awards	Outstanding Sound Editing for an Animated Program	Bradley North, Craig Henighan, Matt Manselle, Matt Telsey, and Brian Straub (for "400 Boys")	Nominated	
2025	Primetime Creative Arts Emmy Awards	Outstanding Individual Achievement in Animation (Juried)	Daryl Graham (2D animation supervisor) (for "400 Boys")	Won	
2025	Primetime Creative Arts Emmy Awards	Outstanding Individual Achievement in Animation (Juried)	Robert Valley (character design) (for "400 Boys")	Won	
2025	Primetime Creative Arts Emmy Awards	Outstanding Individual Achievement in Animation (Juried)	Gigi Cavenago (art director) (for "How Zeke Got Religion")	Won	
2025	Primetime Creative Arts Emmy Awards	Outstanding Individual Achievement in Animation (Juried)	Edgar Martins (storyboard artist) (for "How Zeke Got Religion")	Won	

== See also ==
- Secret Level, another adult animated anthology by Blur Studios based on video games
