= Alternate Histories =

- Love, Death & Robots episode
- Episode no.: Season 1 Episode 17
- Directed by: Victor Maldonado; Alfredo Torres
- Written by: Philip Gelatt
- Based on: Missives From Possible Futures #1: Alternate History Search Results by John Scalzi
- Editing by: Bo Juhl
- Original air date: 15 March 2019
- Running time: 7 minutes

Cast
- Rebecca Riedy as Multiversity Computer Voice; Dieter Jansen as Adolf Hitler; Scott Whyte as Future Nazi; Chris Cox as Male Background

Episode chronology
← Previous "Ice Age"	Next → "The Secret War"

"Alternate Histories" is the seventeenth episode of the first volume of the adult animated anthology series Love, Death & Robots. It was directed by Víctor Maldonado and Alfredo Torres from a screenplay written by Philip Gelatt, which was based on the short story Missives From Possible Futures #1: Alternate History Search Results by John Scalzi. It focuses on an app that provides six simulations of Adolf Hitler's death and the repercussions it would have on the world. It was animated by Sun Creature Studio.

== Plot ==
A female voice guides us through Multiversity, an application that allows users to modify any historical event and witness a virtual simulation of how history would change. The computer presents six scenarios of the death of a young Adolf Hitler in 1908, long before he became the Führer.

First Death: Hitler, leaving the Academy of Fine Arts Vienna, assaults a Jewish boy after colliding with him, causing him to be murdered by two gunmen. As a result, the Weimar Republic began late, World War II did not begin until 1948, and the United States dropped an atomic bomb on Berlin in 1952. However, World War I and the moon landing proceeded as normal.

Second Death: Hitler is run over by a horse-drawn carriage. As a result, Austria becomes an automotive industrial power by banning horse-drawn carriages. Germany wins World War II thanks to technological aid from its allies. The Great Depression is avoided, and in 1958 the moon landing takes place, with Willy Brandt becoming the first man to walk on the moon.

Third Death: Hitler suffocates after being attacked with an experimental weapon used by the Russian aristocracy that launches giant blocks of gelatin. As a result, Russia becomes the unique world's superpower, using the weapon to eliminate political enemies like Vladimir Lenin and Archduke Franz Ferdinand of Austria, and winning World War I in 1915. The moon landing occurs in 1988, with Vladimir Putin becoming the first man on the moon.

Fourth Death: Hitler has sex to the point of death with four prostitutes. As a result, the women are brought to court, where they reveal themselves as travelers from a parallel dimension teaching the population "sexy manners." The moon landing takes place in 1996, with Janine Lindemulder becoming the first woman to walk on the moon.

Fifth Death: A piece of a massive asteroid crushes Hitler. As a result, 93% of the species dies when the entire asteroid hits Earth. Later, the rats evolve, create a democratic society, discover nationalism, and destroy themselves. Eventually, the squids become conscious, form a peaceful civilization, and land on the moon in the year 20973412, with Gluugsnergluug becoming the first squid to set foot on the natural satellite.

Sixth Death: Hitler dies from a space-time paradox when he touches his future self, who traveled back in time to save him from the anti-Nazi group. As a result, the simulation displays a blue screen of death. The app reboots and apologizes. The episode ends with the user selecting a different alternate timeline where "Lincoln shoots first".

== Reception ==
=== Critical reception ===
David Fear of Rolling Stone singled out "Alternate Histories" as one of the "Season 1 MVPs". Stephen Cavalier of Skwigly called the short a nice, fun light relief to the series' overall pessimistic tone. Brandon Katz of Observer noted that Hitler's deaths will please audiences. James Temperton of Wired spoke positively of the episode, calling it a "tongue-in-cheek multiverse take on the life and death of Adolf Hitler." Otis Correa of Medium gave the episode 3 out of 5 stars because he believes that while the episode is funny, it plays too hard on cheap laughs, offering flat, unbelievable, and even "childish" content that clashes with the overall tone of the anthology.

=== Top volume lists ===
- 1st — TV Guide (Tim Surette)
- 7th — Screen Rant (Anthony McGlynn)
- 8th — Collider (Dave Trumbore)
- 11th — Vulture (Scott Meslow)
- 18th — Taste of Cinema (Zach Wee)

=== Accolades ===
Year	Award	Category	Recipient	Result	Ref.
2020	47th Annie Awards	Outstanding Achievement in Editorial in an Animated Television/Broadcast Production	Bo Juhl, Stacy Auckland and Valerian Zamel	Won	
