= Night of the Mini Dead =

- Love, Death & Robots episode
- Episode no.: Season 3 Episode 4
- Directed by: Robert Bisi; Andy Lyon
- Written by: Robert Bisi; Andy Lyon
- Story by: Jeff Fowler; Tim Miller
- Editing by: Dave Conte
- Original air date: 20 May 2022
- Running time: 7 minutes

Episode chronology
← Previous "The Very Pulse of the Machine"	Next → "Kill Team Kill"

"Night of the Mini Dead" is the fourth episode of the third volume of the adult animated anthology series Love, Death & Robots. It was written and directed by Robert Bisi and Andy Lyon from a story by Jeff Fowler and Tim Miller. It follows a zombie apocalypse that ravages a miniature world unleashed by a sexual encounter. It was animated by BUCK.

== Plot ==
A young couple has sex in a cemetery. There, the man knocks over a statue next to a wooden cross, which falls upside down onto the statue's empty pedestal. Lightning strikes the inverted cross, resurrecting the dead. The zombies quickly kill the couple and return to civilization.

The chaos and carnage begins in California and quickly spreads across the globe, with zombies invading Mexico, France, Thailand, Canada, and the Vatican. News of the plague reaches Washington, D.C., and airstrikes are ordered on major American cities. Survivors in these cities have resorted to Mad-Max-style modifications to their vehicles in an effort to combat the undead.

Upon attacking a nuclear power plant, the zombies receive an exponential power boost after being sprayed with mutagens, some becoming larger than others and capable of breathing green flames. With no other option, the world's powers launch nuclear artillery, destroying the planet in the process.

== Reception ==
=== Critical reception ===
Aiko Hilkinger of Screen Speck gave the episode a 6 out of 10, praising the animation and art direction for creating a miniature apocalypse. She also said the short is a silly, adorable, and overwhelmingly terrifying way of portraying the end of the world. Tara Bennett by IGN called it a nihilistic fart joke with squeaky voices. Andrew Webster by The Verge highlights that despite the generic premise, the short manages to stand out for having an adorable artistic style.

=== Top volume lists ===
- 3rd — Collider (Tom Moore)
- 4th — Decider (Kayla Cobb)
- 6th — Vulture (Scott Meslow)
- 7th — Forbes (Paul Tassi)
- 7th — Screen Rant (George Lawley)

=== Accolades ===
Year	Award	Category	Recipient	Result	Ref.
2023	70th Golden Reel Awards	Outstanding Achievement in Music Editing – Broadcast Short Form	Jeff Charbonneau	Nominated	
2023	21st Visual Effects Society Awards	Outstanding Compositing and Lighting in an Episode	Tim Emeis, José Maximiano, Renaud Tissandié and Nacere Guerouaf	Won	
