= YoungGuns International Award =

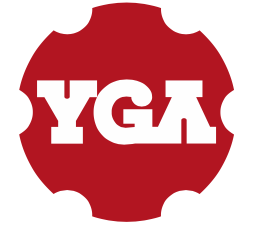
YoungGuns International Award Logo

YoungGuns International Award (also referenced as YoungGuns Award and YGAward) is an annual award show for people 30 or under in the advertising and communication industries. It was founded by Kristian Barnes, Jason Williams, and Michael Kean in 2001 after they claimed they expressed frustration that major awards at the time were typically won by well established individuals in the industries.

== Innovation ==
The YoungGuns Award show introduced a number of innovations in the award category. It was the first international award show focused solely on young and emerging talent, participants had to be under 30 to qualify for entry. It was first international award to produce an advertising campaign for its call of entries (see below). It was the first to offer prizes to the winners, for the YoungGun of the Year it was a cash prize as well as a place on the following years jury, and for the YoungGun Student of the Year it was a work placement with an international agency (Leo Burnett). It was the first to take the winners and finalists work on a travelling exhibition (including Australia, NZ, UK, US, HK, India Singapore, South Africa and Japan).

== Call for entry ==
YoungGuns was the first international award to produce an advertising campaign for its call of entries. The campaigns are renowned for being controversial. Most notable include "Peak Early" which focused on child prodigies; "Quit in Style" which allowed anyone to upload content such as videos and feedback to demonstrate how they would quit their jobs; 'Worth the Pain' which encouraged creatives to push through to greatness but told them in detail about the effect it would have on their bodies and "Hardly Legal" a porn inspired tribute to creativity. Despite the controversy the yearly campaigns have proven to be quite appealing to the creative industry. Some campaigns have managed to receive recognition in other creative awards such as the One Club New Zealand Grande Axis and Cannes Lions International Advertising Festival.

The call for entries campaigns are usually created by selective advertising agencies or creative collaborations from all around the world. Some of the past Call for Entry campaign creators included Droga5, The Glue Society, Taxi, Crispin, Porter + Bogusky and Saatchi & Saatchi (New Zealand).

== YoungGuns of the Decade ==
In 2010 YoungGuns announced the best young individual talent, agencies and advertising schools based on awarded entries from its first 10 years. The YoungGun of the Decade was Jeff Anderson (Goodby Silverstein & Partners, San Francisco), the YoungGun Agency of the Decade was BBDO and the Advertising School of the Decade was Miami Ad School, Europe.
