= KLIK Amsterdam Animation Festival =

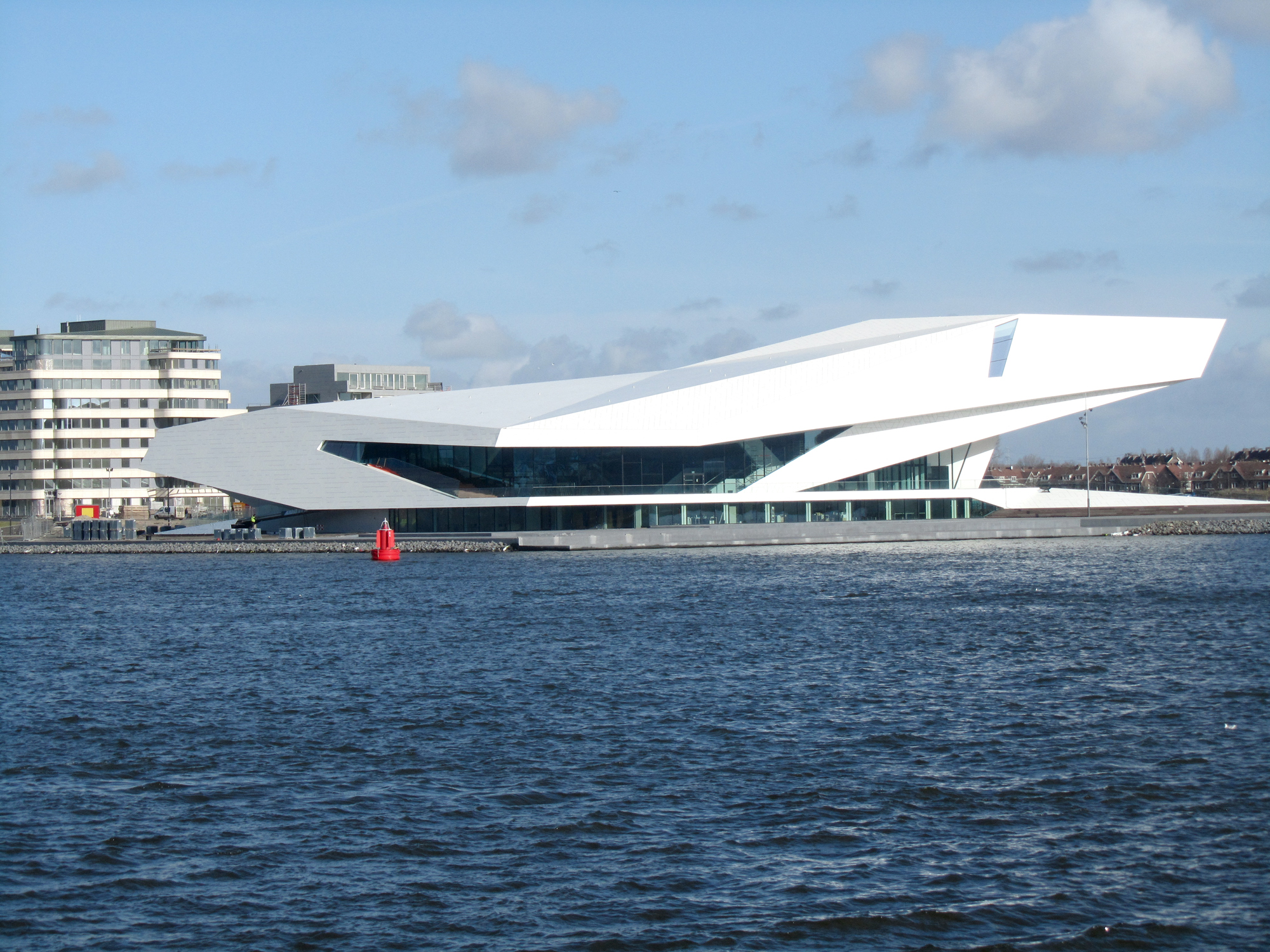
- EYE Film Institute in Amsterdam, venue of KLIK.
- Location: Amsterdam, The Netherlands
- Founded: 2007; 18 years ago
- Language: International
- Website: www.klik.amsterdam

KLIK Amsterdam Animation Festival is a festival in Amsterdam for animated art, first held in 2007. It is organized by the non-profit KLIK foundation and takes place annually at the Eye Film Institute in Amsterdam, the Netherlands. Among the animated art forms featured at KLIK are animated feature films, shorts, commercials, video games, music videos, comics, and installations.

== History ==
KLIK Amsterdam Animation Festival is organized by the KLIK Foundation. KLIK originates from the Flemish KLIT! Multimedia Festival, that took place in 2004 and 2005, organized by students of the animation academy of the Royal Academy of Fine Arts in Ghent, Belgium. Their purpose was to provide the general public with access to both their own works and those of their fellow students working in other disciplines. In 2007 the KLIT! Amsterdam Animation Festival was organized for the first time. In 2008 the name 'KLIT!' was changed to 'KLIK!'. In 2016 the organization dropped the exclamation mark, changing the name to 'KLIK'.n I2019 KLIK Amsterdam Animation Festival and Holland Animation Film Festival (HAFF) realized that their differences could be used to complement each other, and they merged to create Kaboom Animation Festival.

Kaboom Animation Festival is now a yearly event where professionals and fans meet, inspire each other, and enjoy the latest and greatest that animation has to offer. All while celebrating the Dutch animation industry.

== KLIK Amsterdam Animation Festival ==
The annual festival's program is formed by the following sections:

=== International competition ===
KLIK organizes an international competition for animated shorts, for which it has a call for entries from March until July. Animation professionals and students are invited to submit their work to compete in various categories. An independent jury decides on the awards.

=== KLIK Specials ===
Alongside the international competition and the theme programming, the festival also offers KLIK Specials, featuring works that touch upon highly relevant topics or are of exceptional artistic quality. For instance, in 2018, the Academy Awards nominated film The Breadwinner is featured and its director Nora Twomey is present at the festival as a guest. The KLIK Specials segment can include the following:

- Feature film (premieres)
- Documentaries on animation related topics
- Midnight Madness: a program of entertaining but bizarre films that weren't selected for the competition
- Presentations/ talks

=== Theme programming ===
Alongside the international competition, each year the festival has a theme that serves to address a socially relevant or current topic from multiple perspectives. This theme is expressed in film screenings, workshops and presentations, installations, and festival decoration and artwork. An overview over the past themes:

- State of Mind (2018)
- Never Grow Up (2017)
- The World We Live In (2016)
- Rock, Paper, Scissors (2015)
- Girls, Boys & Beyond (2014)
- Fabulous Fifties (2013)
- Violence (2012)
- Science (2010)
- Politics and Erotics (2009)
- India (2008)

=== KLIK Industry ===
The festival has a special segment for animation professionals to assess the latest developments in and needs of the animation sector. This segment can contain panel discussions, interviews, masterclasses, and consultation hours. A recurring event in the KLIK Industry segment is the Debutante Ball: animation graduates can introduce their work to producers by showing a one-minute show reel.

=== KLIK Events ===
In addition to animation screenings, the festival includes several festive events.

=== KLIK for Kids ===
A program of animated shorts and features geared to children aged 5 to 12.

== KLIK World Domination Award ==
Since 2013, the festival's major price the KLIK World Domination Award is awarded to an organisation, studio, or individual that helped Dutch animation on a global scale. Nominations are made by the public, an independent jury makes the decision. Past winners of the award:

Klik World Domination Award winners by year
Year	Winner	Occupation
2018	Hisko Hulsing	Director, animator, composer, painter and storyboard artist
2017	Ton Roosendaal	Software developer and film producer
2016	Michaël Dudok de Wit	Animator, director, and illustrator
2015	Bruno Felix	Director and producer
2014	il Luster	Animation studio
2013	Erik-Jan de Boer	Director
