= Studio La Cachette =

French animation studio

- Type: Private
- Industry: Animation
- Founded: 2014
- Founder: Ulysse Malassagne; Julien Chheng; Oussama Bouacheria
- Headquarters: Paris, France
- Products: Feature films Television series Short films
- Website: studiolacachette.com

Studio La Cachette is a French animation studio based in Paris. It was co-founded by Ulysse Malassagne, Julien Chheng and Oussama Bouacheria in 2014. The studio is best known for providing animation services in Genndy Tartakovsky's television series Primal and Unicorn: Warriors Eternal, as well as for their contributions to the anthology series Love, Death & Robots and Star Wars: Visions.

== History ==
La Cachette first gained attention in 2013 after the release of Kairos, an animated trailer for Malassagne's comic of the same name. The short went viral thanks to the coverage of animation news websites like Catsuka and Cartoon Brew. The studio was then contracted to do a 2D animated sequence for the French computer animated film Mune: Guardian of the Moon (2014), in which Bouacheria was already working as a storyboard artist.

In 2019, La Cachette produced an episode for Netflix's adult animated anthology series Love, Death & Robots. It was the only fully 2D animated entry in the series first season.

Around this time, the studio received an offer from Genndy Tartakovsky to do the pilot for his next project, Primal. La Cachette was assisted by former art director, Douglas Rogers. The series premiered on Adult Swim on October 8, 2019, and received widespread critical acclaim, with much praise for its animation. In August 2020, the series was renewed for a second season and has since received six Primetime Creative Arts Emmy Awards nominations, winning five of them, including Outstanding Individual Achievement in Animation. A third season is currently in development.

La Cachette and Tartakovsky would collaborate once again in Unicorn: Warriors Eternal (2023), a long gestating project from Tartakovsky which was conceived during his early days at Cartoon Network Studios. Similarly to Primal, the series received positive reviews.

In 2023, Lucasfilm announced that La Cachette was one of the animated studios that had created a short for the second volume of the animated anthology series Star Wars: Visions. Written and directed by Chheng, "The Spy Dancer" was released on May 4, 2023, along the rest of the shorts. The season received critical acclaim.

More recently, Malassagne, Chheng and Bouacheria started working on their own personal projects. The first of these, Malassagne's Le Collège Noir, debuted on October 31, 2023 on the French SVOD platform ADN. An adaptation of his comic of the same name, the television series consists of six episodes with a length of 15 minutes each, and was produced in collaboration with Japanese studio Toei Animation.

The other two projects are Bouacheria's Mehdi, Avis de Passage, based on his personal experience as a postman before he joined the Gobelins school, and Chheng's Mu Yi, a fantasy feature film that takes inspiration from Chinese folklore.

== Filmography ==
=== Television ===
#	Title	Premiere date	Network
1	Love, Death & Robots: "Sucker of Souls"	2019	Netflix
2	Primal	2019–present	Adult Swim
3	Star Wars: Visions: "The Spy Dancer"	2023	Disney+
4	Unicorn: Warriors Eternal	2023	Adult Swim
5	Le Collège Noir	2023	ADN
6	Devil May Cry: "The First Circle"	2025	Netflix

=== Short films ===
- Le Royaume (2010)
- Kairos (2013)
- The Ballad of Bea & Cad (2018)

=== Contract works ===
- Mune: Guardian of the Moon (2014)
