= Misfits Market =

Subscription grocery delivery service

Misfits Market is a subscription-based grocery delivery service founded in 2018 by Abhi Ramesh in Philadelphia. The company built brand recognition as a service that sells produce which does not meet size or aesthetic standards of retail grocery stores. By 2026, only 10% of its revenue came from substandard produce while the vast majority was from delivering ordinary groceries.

In 2022, the company announced it was acquiring its rival Imperfect Foods. In 2025, it acquired The Rounds, a startup focused on reusable packaging and sustainable delivery of recurring household essentials. Founder and CEO Abhi Ramesh aspires to make Misfits Market the Amazon Prime of perishable food and says that monetizing perishable food infrastructure is something that has always been in the back of his mind.
