= Sun Creature Studio =

Danish animation studio

Sun Creature Studio is a Danish animation studio. It was founded in 2014 when the creators launched a Kickstarter campaign to fund the production of the animated series The Reward: Tales of Alethrion. In 2016 it collaborated with fellow Danish production company Final Cut for Real to produce Flee, an animated documentary film about a young Afghan refugee in Denmark.

It later produced three advertisements for Travel Oregon called "Only Slightly Exaggerated" (2018), "Only Slightly (More) Exaggerated" (2019), and ""Still Only Slightly Exaggerated" (2021), all of which included Oregon landscapes animated in the style of Hayao Miyazaki. As of 2019 Sun Creature has been added to the talent roster of Blacklist, a production company owned by Psyop.

In 2019, Sun Creature Studios produced the animation for an episode of the Netflix animated anthology series Love, Death & Robots. The episode is called "Alternate Histories". It is included in Volume 1 of the series.

== Television series ==
Show	Year(s)	Co-production with	Notes
The Heroic Quest of the Valiant Prince Ivandoe	2017–2024	Hanna-Barbera Studios Europe	
Emara: Emirates Hero	2018	Eating Star Studios	original work
Love, Death & Robots	2019	Blur Studio	Episode: Alternate Histories
Ninjago: Reimagined	2021	LEGO	Episode: Golden Legend — Part of an Anthology Webseries celebrating Ninjago's 10th Anniversary
Ninjago Legends: Monstrosity	2025	LEGO	Webseries
Splinter Cell: Deathwatch	2025	Tradecraft and FOST Studio	Based on the Tom Clancy's Splinter Cell video game franchise by Ubisoft.

=== Film ===
Film	Year(s)	Co-production with	Notes
Flee	2021		
Fate/Grand Order: Final Singularity-Grand Temple of Time: Solomon	2021	CloverWorks	the anime by Kinoko Nasu and Type-Moon
Julián	2026	Cartoon Saloon	
The Twilight World	2026	Knudsen Pictures	
