= List of Annie Awards ceremonies =

This is a list of Annie Awards ceremonies, the date of the ceremony, the year in film they were honoring, their hosts, and the Best Animated Feature.

== Venues ==
The venues for the Annie Awards ceremonies have been:

- 1972: Sportsmen's Lodge, Studio City, California
- 1973–1982 -- Unknown
- 1983: Sportsmen's Lodge
- 1984 - 1985 -- Unknown
- 1986: The Hollywood Roosevelt Hotel
- 1987: Unknown
- 1988: Universal Studios Hitchcock Theater
- 1989-1991: Unknown
- 1992–1995: Academy of Television Arts and Sciences Plaza Theatre
- 1996–1997: Pasadena Civic Auditorium
- 1998–2007: Alex Theatre
- 2008–2020, 2023–present: Royce Hall

== Ceremonies ==
- 1st – 1972 – hosted by Grim Natwick
- 2nd – 1973 - hosted by Mel Blanc
- 3rd – 1974 - hosted by Roger Ebert
- 4th – 1975 - hosted by Sherman Brothers
- 5th – 1976 - hosted by Woody Allen
- 6th – 1977 - hosted by Henry Gibson
- 7th – 1978 - hosted by Jo Anne Worley
- 8th – 1979 - hosted by Lily Tomlin and Richard Dawson
- 9th – 1980 - hosted by Paul Winchell
- 10th – 1981 - hosted by Casey Kasem
- 11th – 1982 - hosted by Eartha Kitt
- 12th – 1983 - hosted by Ken Sansom
- 13th – 1984 - hosted by Phil Harris and Brock Peters
- 14th – 1985 - hosted by David Ogden Stiers
- 15th – 1986 - hosted by Michael J. Fox
- 16th – 1987 - hosted by Steven Bednarski
- 17th – 1988 - hosted by June Foray
- 18th – 1990 - hosted by Robin Williams
- 19th – 1991 - hosted by Christopher Plummer

	Date	Honoring Year(s)	Venue	Host(s)	Best Feature	Most Awards
20th	November 14, 1992	1991–1992	ATAS Plaza Theatre	George Carlin	Beauty and the Beast	N/A
21st	November 5, 1993	1992–1993	ATAS Plaza Theatre	E.G. Daily	Aladdin	N/A
22nd	November 12, 1994	1993–1994	ATAS Plaza Theatre	Janice Kawaye	The Lion King	The Lion King (3)
23rd	November 11, 1995	1994–1995	ATAS Plaza Theatre	Jim Cummings; Corey Burton	Pocahontas	Pocahontas (4)
24th	November 10, 1996	1995–1996	Pasadena Civic Auditorium	Leonard Maltin	Toy Story	Toy Story (7)
25th	November 16, 1997	1996–1997	Pasadena Civic Auditorium	Gary Owens	Cats Don't Dance	Hercules, The Simpsons (4 each)
26th	November 13, 1998	1997–1998	Alex Theatre	Jay Thomas	Mulan	Mulan (10)
27th	November 6, 1999	1998–1999	Alex Theatre	Cathy Cavadini	The Iron Giant	The Iron Giant (9)
28th	November 11, 2000	1999–2000	Alex Theatre	Rob Paulsen; Maurice LaMarche	Toy Story 2	Toy Story 2 (7)
29th	November 10, 2001	2000–2001	Alex Theatre	Billy West	Shrek	Shrek (8)
30th	February 1, 2003	2002	Alex Theatre	Steve Marmel	Spirited Away	Spirited Away, Spirit: Stallion of the Cimarron, Samurai Jack (4 each)
31st	February 7, 2004	2003	Alex Theatre	Steve Marmel	Finding Nemo	Finding Nemo (8)
32nd	January 30, 2005	2004	Alex Theatre	Tom Kenny	The Incredibles	The Incredibles (10)
33rd	February 4, 2006	2005	Alex Theatre	Tom Kenny	Wallace & Gromit: The Curse of the Were-Rabbit	Wallace & Gromit: The Curse of the Were-Rabbit (10)
34th	February 11, 2007	2006	Alex Theatre	Tom Kenny	Cars	Flushed Away (5)
35th	February 8, 2008	2007	Royce Hall	Tom Kenny	Ratatouille	Ratatouille (9)
36th	January 30, 2009	2008	Royce Hall	Tom Kenny	Kung Fu Panda	Kung Fu Panda (10)
37th	February 6, 2010	2009	Royce Hall	William Shatner	Up	The Princess and the Frog, Prep & Landing, Coraline (3 each)
38th	February 5, 2011	2010	Royce Hall	Tom Kenny	How to Train Your Dragon	How to Train Your Dragon (10)
39th	February 4, 2012	2011	Royce Hall	Patton Oswalt	Rango	Rango, Prep & Landing: Naughty vs. Nice (4 each)
40th	February 2, 2013	2012	Royce Hall	Leonard Maltin; Rob Paulsen; Maurice LaMarche	Wreck-It Ralph	Wreck-It Ralph (5)
41st	February 1, 2014	2013	Royce Hall	Patrick Warburton	Frozen	Frozen (5)
42nd	January 31, 2015	2014	Royce Hall	No hosts	How to Train Your Dragon 2	How to Train Your Dragon 2 (6)
43rd	February 6, 2016	2015		No hosts	Inside Out	Inside Out (10)
44th	February 4, 2017	2016		No hosts	Zootopia	Zootopia (6)
45th	February 3, 2018	2017		No hosts	Coco	Coco (11)*
46th	February 2, 2019	2018		No hosts	Spider-Man: Into the Spider-Verse	Spider-Man: Into the Spider-Verse (7)
47th	January 25, 2020	2019		No hosts	Klaus	Klaus (7)
48th	April 16, 2021	2020	Virtual	No hosts	Soul	Soul (7)
49th	March 12, 2022	2021	Virtual	No hosts	The Mitchells vs. the Machines	Arcane (9)*
50th	February 25, 2023	2022	Royce Hall	No hosts	Guillermo del Toro's Pinocchio	Guillermo del Toro's Pinocchio (5)
51st	February 17, 2024	2023	Royce Hall	No hosts	Spider-Man: Across the Spider-Verse	Spider-Man: Across the Spider-Verse (7)
52nd	February 8, 2025	2024	Royce Hall	No hosts	The Wild Robot	The Wild Robot (9)
53rd	February 21, 2026	2025	Royce Hall	No hosts	TBA	TBA

*Record holder for most Annie Awards received in a single year
