= Annie Award for Best Animated Television Commercial =

Annual US television award

- Awarded for: Excellence in animated television commercials
- Country: United States
- Presented by: ASIFA-Hollywood
- First award: 1992
- Currently held by: Olipop Yeti – Screen Novelties & Passion Pictures (2025)
- Website: annieawards.org

The Annie Award for Best Animated Television Commercial is an Annie Award given annually to the best animated television commercials. The category was first presented at the 20th Annie Awards.

== Winners and nominees ==
=== 1990s ===
Best Animated Television Commercial

Year	Commercial	Company/Program	Studios
1992 (20th)
1992 (20th)	"Hare Jordan"	Nike	Warner Bros. Animation
1992 (20th)	"Car Cover"	Lexus	Rhythm & Hues, Inc.
1992 (20th)	"Cowardly Baskets"	Reebok	Rhythm & Hues, Inc.
1992 (20th)	"One Match"	Match Light Charcoal	Rhythm & Hues, Inc.
1992 (20th)	"Cheese Pizza"	Ritz Bitz Sandwich Crackers	Will Vinton Studios
1992 (20th)	"Fiesta"	Ritz Bitz Sandwich Crackers	Will Vinton Studios
1992 (20th)	"Mug"	Beecham Hot Lemon	Will Vinton Studios
1992 (20th)	"Spot Light Switch"	Diet 7UP	Duck Soup Productions
1992 (20th)	"Stork"	Michelin Tires	Baer Animation Company, Inc.
1993 (21st)
1993 (21st)	"Polar Bears"	Coca-Cola	Sierra Hotel Productions
1993 (21st)	"Aerospace Jordan"	Nike	Renegade Animation
1993 (21st)	"Come to Life"	Coors	Acme Filmworks
1993 (21st)	"One Good Hand"	Oregon State Lottery	Acme Filmworks
1993 (21st)	"Woman Finding Love"	Levi's	Acme Filmworks
1993 (21st)	"In the Dark"	Butterfinger	Film Roman
1993 (21st)	"Runball"	Footlocker	Duck Soup Productions
1994 (22nd)
1994 (22nd)	"Sax Man"		Duck Soup Productions
1994 (22nd)	"Heart Rate"		Kurtz & Friends
1994 (22nd)	"In the Bag"		Will Vinton Studios
1994 (22nd)	"Tango"		R/Greenberg

Best Animated Promotional Production

Year	Commercial	Company/Program	Studios
1995 (23rd)
1995 (23rd)	"Wile E. Coyote-Helicopter"	Eveready Batteries	Warner Bros. Animation
1995 (23rd)	"John Dough"	Citibank	Optimus, Inc.
1995 (23rd)	"Canary Boom"	Felix the Cat	Film Roman
1995 (23rd)	"Chicago Blues"	Shell Oil	R/Greenberg Associates
1995 (23rd)	"Unforgettable Classics"	The Simpsons	Film Roman, Fox
1996 (24th)
1996 (24th)	Not awarded		
1997 (25th)
1997 (25th)	"Super Mom Commercial"	Coca-Cola	
1997 (25th)	"Main Title"	The Angry Beavers	
1997 (25th)	"Promotional Trailer"	Spawn	
1997 (25th)	"Main Title"	Gargoyles	

Outstanding Achievement in an Animated Interstitial, Promotional Production or Title Sequence

Year	Commercial	Company/Program	Studios
1998 (26th)
1998 (26th)	"Late Night Black and White"	Cartoon Network	Ink Biscuits
1998 (26th)	"Genie's Great Minds: Ben Franklin"		Walt Disney Television Animation
1998 (26th)	"Canada Open"	Cartoon Network	Wild Brain, Inc.
1998 (26th)	"Retromotion Open"	Locomotion Channel	Wild Brain, Inc.
1998 (26th)	"The Wonderful Ice Cream Suit"		Walt Disney Company, Acme Filmworks

Outstanding Achievement in an Animated Television Commercial

Year	Commercial	Company/Program	Studios
1998 (26th)
1998 (26th)	"Flares/Big Pockets"	Old Navy	Spümcø, Inc.
1998 (26th)	"G-Police"	Wong Doody	Acme Filmworks
1998 (26th)	"Lizards II"	Circle-K Stores	Pacific Data Images
1998 (26th)	"Willy Wonka's Wild Ride Campaign: Shock Tarts"	Nestlé Corporation	Wild Brain, Inc.
1998 (26th)	"Old Friends"	American Express	Warner Bros. Classic Animation
1999 (27th)
1999 (27th)	"Sensitive"	Levi Strauss	Wild Brain, Inc.
1999 (27th)	"Gnome"	Hollywood Gum	Ring of Fire
1999 (27th)	"Celebrate Being in the Dark"	San Francisco Film Society	Wild Brain, Inc.
1999 (27th)	"Performance Fleece, Old Navy"		Spümcø, Inc.
1999 (27th)	"Tweety"	Kraft Foods/Miracle Whip	Warner Bros. Classic Animation

=== 2000s ===
Year	Commercial	Company/Program	Studios
2000 (28th)
2000 (28th)	"Genie"	Mirinda	Will Vinton Studios
2000 (28th)	"Elves"	Web TV	Acme Filmworks, Inc.
2000 (28th)	"About Face"	Crayola	Acme Filmworks, Inc.
2000 (28th)	"Carpool"	Village Pantry	Renegade Animation, Inc.
2000 (28th)	"Playa's Delight"	Kevin Garnett - Nike	Wild Brain, Inc.
2001 (29th)
2001 (29th)	"Darwin: Earthlink"		Acme Filmworks
2001 (29th)	"Beat Box"	Wrigley's Winterfresh	Wild Brain, Inc.
2001 (29th)	"Urban Hip Hopper"	Wrigley's Winterfresh	Wild Brain, Inc.
2001 (29th)	"Brain: Partnership for a Drug-Free America"		Psyop
2001 (29th)	"Passing the Baton (Interstitial)"	Cartoon Network On-Air	
2002 (30th)
2002 (30th)	"Courage"	Cartoon Network	
2002 (30th)	"Arrow, Lunz Shoes"		Psyop
2002 (30th)	"Catch"	AT&T	Acme Filmworks
2002 (30th)	"Every Move You Make, Sinai Hospital"		Acme Filmworks
2002 (30th)	"Don't Mess"	Dodge	Renegade Animation
2003 (31st)
2003 (31st)	"It's Alive"	Lamisil	Wild Brain, Inc.
2003 (31st)	"Woodcut"	Colorado Lottery	Acme Filmworks
2003 (31st)	"Casino"	Wisconsin Lottery	Acme Filmworks
2003 (31st)	"Drift"	Bombay	Psyop Inc.
2004 (32nd)
2004 (32nd)	"Interview"	United Airlines	Acme Filmworks
2004 (32nd)	"Looney Tunes - AFLAC"		Warner Bros. Animation
2004 (32nd)	"Freeboy"	Nintendo	Asylum
2004 (32nd)	"Three Bears"	Quaker Chewy Bars	Hornet Inc.
2004 (32nd)	"Reebok"		Blur Studio
2005 (33rd)
2005 (33rd)	"Mr. Pants"	United Airlines	Acme Filmworks
2005 (33rd)	"1975"	ConocoPhillips	Ring of Fire
2005 (33rd)	"Bastard Wants to Hit Me"	They Might Be Giants	Laika/House
2005 (33rd)	"Futbol"	Coke	Laika/House
2005 (33rd)	"Tower"	GE	Quiet Man Inc.
2006 (34th)
2006 (34th)	"Dragon"	United Airlines	DUCK Studios
2006 (34th)	Candy Factory		Ka-Chew!/Screen Novelties
2006 (34th)	"Believe"	ESPN	Laika/House
2006 (34th)	"Dancing Couple"	Hilton	Acme Filmworks
2006 (34th)	"Giraffe"	St. Louis Zoo	Z Animation
2007 (35th)
2007 (35th)	"Power Shares Escape Average"		Acme Filmworks
2007 (35th)	"Homeowners"	Esurance	Wild Brain
2007 (35th)	"Watering Can"	CVS	Acme Filmworks
2007 (35th)	"Twister"	Idaho Lottery	Acme Filmworks
2007 (35th)	"Alaska"	Oregon Lottery	Laika/house
2008 (36th)
2008 (36th)	"Heart"	United Airlines	DUCK Studios
2008 (36th)	"Giant Monster"		Curious Pictures
2008 (36th)	"Long Legs Mr. Hyde"		Curious Pictures
2008 (36th)	"Rotofugi: The Collectors"		Screen Novelties/RSA Films
2008 (36th)	"Sarah"		Z Animation
2009 (37th)
2009 (37th)	"Deportees"	Spanish Lottery	Acme Filmworks, Inc.
2009 (37th)	"In the Dark"	Goldfish	Blur Studios, Inc.
2009 (37th)	"Twiceland"	Idaho Lottery	Acme Filmworks, Inc.
2009 (37th)	"Nutty Trade"	McDonald's	Blue Sky Studios
2009 (37th)	"The Spooning"	Kellogg's Corn Pops	Screen Novelties/Acne Media

=== 2010s ===
Year	Commercial	Company/Program	Studios
2010 (38th)
2010 (38th)	"Children's Medical Center"		DUCK Studios
2010 (38th)	"And Then There was Salsa"	Frito Lay Dips	Laika/House
2010 (38th)	"Speed Skatin" (Winter Olympic Interstitial)	How to Train Your Dragon	DreamWorks Animation
2010 (38th)	"Spaceman Stu"	McDonald's	DUCK Studios
2010 (38th)	"When Harry Met Sally"	Pop Secret	Nathan Love
2011 (39th)
2011 (39th)	"Sea"	Twinings	Psyop
2011 (39th)	"Foghorn"	GEICO	Renegade Animation
2011 (39th)	"Apple Tree"	McDonald's	DUCK Studios/KOMPOST
2011 (39th)	"Suzi Van Zoom"	McDonald's	DUCK Studios/KOMPOST
2011 (39th)	"Stuff"	Norton	Psyop
2011 (39th)	"Good Night"	Statoil	Studio AKA
2011 (39th)	"The Pirate"		Meindbender
2012 (40th)
2012 (40th)	Not Awarded		
2013 (41st)
2013 (41st)	"Despicable Me 2 - Cinemark"		Illumination Entertainment
2013 (41st)	"Sound of the Woods"		Acme Filmworks
2013 (41st)	"The Polar Bears Movie"		Scott Free Productions, RSA Films Animal Logic
2014 (42nd)
2014 (42nd)	"Flight of the Stories"		Aardman Animations
2014 (42nd)	"Swan Song"	CitizenM	PES Film/Stoopid Buddy Stoodios
2014 (42nd)	Lego Batman 3: Beyond Gotham		Plastic Wax Studios
2015 (43rd)
2015 (43rd)	"Man and Dog"		Psyop
2015 (43rd)	"Holiday Magic"	Chex Party Mix	Stoopid Buddy Stoodios
2015 (43rd)	"All the Performances in Every Tire"	Michelin Total Performance	Moonbot Studios
2015 (43rd)	"We Are All Farmers"		Acme Filmworks
2016 (44th)
2016 (44th)	"Night Shift"	Loteria	Passion Pictures Ltd
2016 (44th)	"Duelyst"		Powerhouse Animation Studios, Inc.
2016 (44th)	"Lego Star Wars: The Force Awakens - Trailer"		Plastic Wax
2016 (44th)	"Lily & The Snowman"		Hornet
2016 (44th)	"The Importance of Paying Attention: Teeth"		Bill Plympton Studio & J.J.Sedelmaier Productions, Inc.
2017 (45th)
2017 (45th)	"June"		Broad Reach Pictures, Chromosphere, Lyft
2017 (45th)	"Biscotti, Una Storia Buena"		Hornet
2017 (45th)	"Legends Never Die"	League of Legends	Passion Animation Studios
2017 (45th)	"The Greatest Gift"	Sainsbury's	Passion Animation Studios
2017 (45th)	"Please the Cheese"		Psyop
2018 (46th)
2018 (46th)	"There's a Rang-Tan in My Bedroom"	Greenpeace	Passion Animation Studios
2018 (46th)	"Goldfish at the Fair"		Stoopid Buddy Stoodios
2018 (46th)	"Grinch / 40 / Olympics Spot"		Illumination
2018 (46th)	"Joy and Heron"	JD.com	Passion Pictures
2018 (46th)	"The Fearless Are Free"		Nexus Studios
2019 (47th)
2019 (47th)	"The Mystical Journey of Jimmy Page's ‘59 Telecaster"		Nexus Studios
2019 (47th)	Dove Self-Esteem Project x Steven Universe: "Social Media"	Cartoon Network, Dov	Chromosphere
2019 (47th)	"Season 7 Launch Spot"	Fortnite	Epic Games / Screen Novelties / iam8bit

=== 2020s ===
Best Sponsored

Year	Commercial	Company/Program	Studios
2020 (48th)
2020 (48th)	"There's a Monster in My Kitchen"	Greenpeace	Cartoon Saloon, Mother
2020 (48th)	"Edgar's Christmas"	Erste Group	Passion Animation Studios
2020 (48th)	"Max & Maxine"		Hornet
2020 (48th)	"Travel the Vote"		Hornet
2020 (48th)	"The Last Mile"	Volkswagen	Nexus Studios
2021 (49th)
2021 (49th)	A Future Begins		Nexus Studios
2021 (49th)	"Featherweight"	Fleet Foxes	Sing-Sing
2021 (49th)	The Good Guest Guide to Japan	Airbnb	Chromosphere
2021 (49th)	Tiptoe & The Flying Machine		Nexus Studios
2021 (49th)	"Don't Touch That Dial" Title Sequence	WandaVision	Titmouse, Inc.
2022 (50th)
2022 (50th)	Save Ralph		Arch Model Studio
2022 (50th)	"Can't Negotiate the Melting Point of Ice"		NOMINT
2022 (50th)	Minions: The Rise of Gru / The Office		Illumination
2022 (50th)	Ted Lasso: The Missing Christmas Mustache		Apple, Doozer, Warner Bros. Television, Universal Television
2022 (50th)	"Today's Holiday Moments are Tomorrow's Memories"		Hornet
2023 (51st)
2023 (51st)	"Video Games" by Tenacious D		Pinreel Inc.
2023 (51st)	Alzheimer's Research UK 'Change The Ending'		Passion Pictures
2023 (51st)	"Laugh Track" by The National (featuring Phoebe Bridgers)		Bernard Derriman
2023 (51st)	Up in smoke		NOMINT
2024 (52nd)
2024 (52nd)	Fuzzy Feelings		Passion Pictures, Hungry Manne
2024 (52nd)	feelslikeimfallinginlove		Blinkink
2024 (52nd)	Moonlit Bamboo Forest		Passion Paris Production, HoYoFair
2024 (52nd)	Natlan Impressions Trailer: "Blaze to Natlan"		BUCK
2024 (52nd)	Welcome to the City of Love		Nexus Studios
2025 (53rd)
2025 (53rd)	Olipop Yeti		Screen Novelties & Passion Pictures
2025 (53rd)	Animated Short: "Trek" | Honkai: Star Rail		FLiiiP Design
2025 (53rd)	Fortnite x The Simpsons: "Apocalypse D'Oh!"		Gracie Films in association with 20th Television Animation
2025 (53rd)	LouiMax Dreams of Being an Adult		Imagine Create Media Inc. in conjunction with Maileg APS
2025 (53rd)	Sonic Racing: CrossWorlds – The Animation		SEGA of America in association with GXS Productions
