= June Foray Award =

American annual animation award

The June Foray Award is a juried award given to individuals in recognition of a significant and benevolent or charitable impact on the art and industry of animation. The award is given by the International Animated Film Association, ASIFA-Hollywood at the annual Annie Awards since 1995. It is named after the voice actress June Foray.

== Award recipients ==
Ceremony	Year	Recipient
24th	1995	June Foray
25th	1996	Bill Littlejohn, Fini Littlejohn
26th	1997	Phyllis Craig
27th	1998	Antran Manoogian
28th	1999	Dave Master
29th	2001	Linda Simensky
30th	2002	Leonard Maltin
31st	2003	Girard R. Miller
32nd	2004	Martha Sigall
33rd	2005	Bill Moritz
34th	2006	Mark Kausler
35th	2007	Stephen Worth
36th	2008	Jerry Beck
37th	2009	Bill Turner
38th	2010	Tom Sito
39th	2011	Ross Iwamoto
40th	2012	Art Leonardi
41st	2013	Howard Green
42nd	2014	Alice Davis
43rd	2015	Charles Solomon
44th	2016	Don Hahn
45th	2017	Bill & Sue Kroyer
46th	2018	Didier Ghez
47th	2019	Adam Burke
48th	2020	Daisuke Tsutsumi
49th	2021	Renzo and Sayoko Kinoshita
50th	2022	Mindy Johnson
51st	2023	BRIC Foundation co-founders Alison Mann and Nicole Hendrix
52nd	2024	Women in Animation
53rd	2025	Sandy Rabins

== See also ==
- List of animation awards
