= Annie Award for Best Animated Home Entertainment Production =

Retired annual US animation award

- Awarded for: Excellence in direct-to-video productions
- Country: United States
- Presented by: ASIFA-Hollywood
- First award: 1995
- Final award: 2009
- Website: annieawards.org

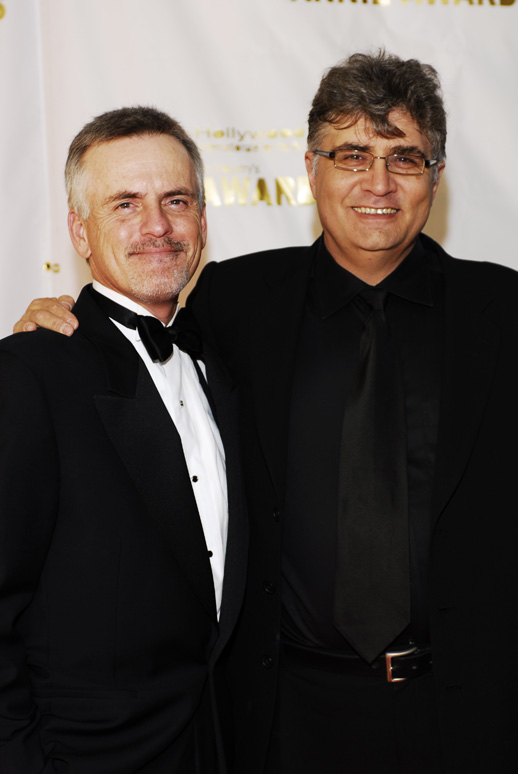
Rob Paulsen and Maurice LaMarche were voice actors in Mickey, Donald, Goofy: The Three Musketeers, a nominee for the 2004 Annie Award for Best Animated Home Entertainment Production.

The Annie Award for Best Animated Home Entertainment Production is awarded annually by ASIFA-Hollywood, a non-profit organization that honors contributions to animation, to the best animated direct-to-video film of the year. It is one of the Annie Awards, which honor contributions to animation, including producers, directors, and voice actors. The Annie Awards were created in 1972 by June Foray to honor individual lifetime contributions to animation.

== History ==
In 1992, the scope of the awards was expanded to honor animation as a whole; the Annie Award for Best Animated Feature was created as a result of this move, and subsequent awards have been created to recognize different contributions to animation. The Annie Award for Best Animated Home Entertainment Production was created in 1995, and has been awarded yearly since. It was originally known as the Annie Award for Best Animated Video Production; the name of the award was changed in 1997 to the Annie Award for Best Home Video Production, was changed again in 1998 to the Annie Award for Outstanding Achievement in an Animated Home Video Production, and was changed in 2002 to the current name. To be eligible for the award, the film must have been released in the year before the next Annie Awards ceremony, and the developers of the game must send a five-minute sample DVD of the film to a committee appointed by the Board of Directors of ASIFA-Hollywood.

As of 2008, the Annie Award for Best Animated Home Entertainment Production has been awarded to thirteen direct-to-video films. The Gate to the Mind’s Eye, a film in the Mind's Eye series, was the first film to win the award. Macross Plus, an original video animation, was the first film to feature Japanese anime to be nominated for the award; the only other film featuring anime to be nominated is the Wachowskis' The Animatrix, a series of animated videos set in the fictional universe of The Matrix series. The film production company Walt Disney Television Animation has had nine of its films nominated for the award, more than any other company, and DisneyToon Studios, a division of Walt Disney Television Animation, has had eight of its films nominated for the award.

== Winners and nominees ==
=== 1990s ===
Year	Film	Studios	Director
1995 (23rd)
1995 (23rd)	The Gate to the Mind’s Eye	Miramar	Michael Boydstun
1995 (23rd)	Macross Plus - Part One	Macross Plus Project, Hero Co.	Shoji Kawamori, Shinichiro Watanabe
1995 (23rd)	Macross Plus - Part Two	Macross Plus Project, Hero Co.	Shoji Kawamori, Shinichiro Watanabe
1995 (23rd)	Opéra Imaginaire	Miramar	José Abel, Hilary Audus
1995 (23rd)	The Land Before Time II: The Great Valley Adventure	Universal Cartoon Studios	Roy Allen Smith
1996 (24th)
1996 (24th)	The Land Before Time III: The Time of the Great Giving	Universal Cartoon Studios	Roy Allen Smith
1997 (25th)	Aladdin and the King of Thieves	Walt Disney Television Animation	Tad Stones
1997 (25th)	The Land Before Time IV: Journey Through the Mists	Universal Cartoon Studios	Roy Allen Smith
1997 (25th)	A Rugrats Vacation	Klasky Csupo, Nickelodeon	Anthony Bell
1997 (25th)	This Land Is Your Land: The Animated Kids' Songs of Woody Guthrie	Artisan Entertainment	Tom Burton
1998 (26th)	Batman & Mr. Freeze: SubZero	Warner Bros. Animation	Boyd Kirkland
1998 (26th)	Belle's Magical World	Walt Disney Television Animation	Cullen Blaine, Daniel de la Vega, Barbara Dourmashkin, Dale Kase, Bob Kline, Burt Medall, Mitch Rochon
1998 (26th)	FernGully 2: The Magical Rescue	Wild Brain	Phil Robinson
1998 (26th)	Pooh's Grand Adventure: The Search for Christopher Robin	Walt Disney Television Animation	Karl Geurs
1998 (26th)	Spunky's Camping Adventure	Global Television Syndication, Christian Broadcasting Network	Angela Costello
1999 (27th)	The Lion King II: Simba's Pride	Walt Disney Television Animation	Darrell Rooney
1999 (27th)	Scooby-Doo on Zombie Island	Hanna-Barbera, Warner Home Video	Hiroshi Aoyama, Kazumi Fukushima, Jim Stenstrum
1999 (27th)	Pocahontas II: Journey to a New World	Walt Disney Television Animation	Tom Ellery, Bradley Raymond
1999 (27th)	The Land Before Time VI: The Secret of Saurus Rock	Universal Cartoon Studios	Charles Grosvenor

=== 2000s ===
Year	Film	Studios	Director
2000 (28th)	An Extremely Goofy Movie	Walt Disney Television Animation	Ian Harrowell, Douglas McCarthy
2000 (28th)	Bartok the Magnificent	Fox Animation Studios	Don Bluth, Gary Goldman
2000 (28th)	Mickey's Once Upon a Christmas	Walt Disney Television Animation	Alex Mann
2000 (28th)	Scooby-Doo! and the Witch's Ghost	Hanna-Barbera, Warner Bros. Animation	Jim Stenstrum
2000 (28th)	Wakko's Wish	Warner Bros. Animation	Liz Holzman, Rusty Mills, Tom Ruegger
2001 (29th)	Batman Beyond: Return of the Joker	Warner Bros. Animation	Curt Geda (fr:Curt Geda)
2001 (29th)	Joseph: King of Dreams	DreamWorks	Rob LaDuca, Robert C. Ramirez
2001 (29th)	Lady and the Tramp II: Scamp's Adventure	Walt Disney Television Animation	Darrell Rooney, Jeannine Roussel
2002 (30th)	Rolie Polie Olie: The Great Defender of Fun	Nelvana, Sparkling	Ron Pitts
2002 (30th)	The Land Before Time IX: Journey to Big Water	Universal Cartoon Studios	Charles Grosvenor
2002 (30th)	The Star of Christmas	Big Idea Productions	Tim Hodge
2003 (31st)	The Animatrix	Silver Pictures, Warner Home Video	Larry Wachowski, Andy Wachowski
2003 (31st)	101 Dalmatians II: Patch's London Adventure	DisneyToon Studios	Jim Kammerud, Brian Smith
2003 (31st)	Rolie Polie Olie: The Baby Bot Chase	Nelvana, Sparkling	Ron Pitts
2003 (31st)	Stitch! The Movie	Walt Disney Television Animation	Tony Craig
2004 (32nd)	The Lion King 1½	DisneyToon Studios	Bradley Raymond
2004 (32nd)	Mickey, Donald, Goofy: The Three Musketeers	DisneyToon Studios	Donovan Cook
2004 (32nd)	Scooby-Doo! and the Loch Ness Monster	Warner Bros. Animation	Scott Jeralds
2005 (33rd)	Lilo & Stitch 2: Stitch Has a Glitch	DisneyToon Studios	Michael LaBash, Anthony Leondis
2005 (33rd)	Bionicle 3: Web of Shadows	Creative Capers Entertainment	David Molina, Terry Shakespeare
2005 (33rd)	Kronk's New Groove	DisneyToon Studios	Elliot M. Bour, Saul Andrew Blinkoff
2005 (33rd)	Tarzan II	DisneyToon Studios	Brian Smith
2005 (33rd)	The Batman vs. Dracula	Warner Bros. Animation	Michael Goguen
2006 (34th)	Bambi II	DisneyToon Studios	Brian Pimental
2006 (34th)	The Adventures of Brer Rabbit	Universal Animation Studios	Byron Vaughns
2006 (34th)	Winnie the Pooh: Shapes & Sizes	DisneyToon Studios	Dave Bossert
2007 (35th)	Futurama: Bender's Big Score	The Curiosity Company, 20th Century Fox Television	Dwayne Carey-Hill
2007 (35th)	Doctor Strange: The Sorcerer Supreme	MLG Productions	Frank Paur
2008 (36th)	Futurama: The Beast with a Billion Backs	The Curiosity Company, 20th Century Fox Television	Peter Avanzino
2008 (36th)	Batman: Gotham Knight	Warner Bros. Animation	Toshi Hiruma, Bruce Timm
2008 (36th)	Christmas Is Here Again	Easy To Dream Entertainment, Renegade Animation	Robert Zappia
2008 (36th)	Justice League: The New Frontier	Warner Bros. Animation	Dave Bullock
2008 (36th)	The Little Mermaid: Ariel's Beginning	DisneyToon Studios	Peggy Holmes
2009 (37th)	Futurama: Into the Wild Green Yonder	The Curiosity Company, 20th Century Fox Television	Peter Avanzino
2009 (37th)	Curious George: A Very Monkey Christmas	Imagine Entertainment, WGBH Boston, Universal Animation Studios	Scott Heming, Cathy Malkasian, Jeff McGrath
2009 (37th)	Green Lantern: First Flight	Warner Bros. Animation	Lauren Montgomery
2009 (37th)	Open Season 2	Sony Pictures Animation	Matthew O'Callaghan, Lauren Wilderman
2009 (37th)	SpongeBob vs. the Big One	United Plankton Pictures, Nickelodeon Animation Studio	Andrew Overtoom
