= Annie Award for Best Animated Television Production =

Annie Award for best television program

- Awarded for: Excellence in television animation
- Country: United States
- Presented by: ASIFA-Hollywood
- First award: The Simpsons (1992)
- Final award: Futurama (2010)
- Website: annieawards.org

The Annie Award for Best Animated Television Production is an Annie Award, awarded annually to the best animated television/broadcasting productions.

The categories for television/broadcasting productions have gone through several name changes and divisions:

- From 1992 to 1997, there was only one award named Best Animated Television Program
- In 1998, the award was split into two categories, Outstanding Achievement in an Animated Daytime Television Program and Outstanding Achievement in an Animated Primetime or Late Night Television Program, but was eventually combined into one category again.
- In 2001, the award received an offshoot category, the Best Animated Television Production for Children award, though the category was not presented regularly until 2007.
- In 2011, the awards for television productions were split into their current division based on the audience of the program, establishing three categories, Best General Audience Animated Television Production, Best Animated Television Production for Children and Best Animated Television Production for Preschool.

== Winners ==
=== 1990s ===
Best Animated Television Program

Year	Program	Studios	Network
1992 (20th)
1992 (20th)	The Simpsons	Fox	Fox
1992 (20th)	TaleSpin	Walt Disney Television	Syndication
1992 (20th)	The Ren & Stimpy Show	Nickelodeon	Nickelodeon
1992 (20th)	Darkwing Duck	Walt Disney Television Animation	Syndication/ABC
1992 (20th)	Tiny Toon Adventures	Amblin/Warner Bros. Television	Fox
1993 (21st)
1993 (21st)	The Simpsons	20th Century Fox Television	Fox
1993 (21st)	The Little Mermaid	Walt Disney Television Animation	CBS
1993 (21st)	Tiny Toon Adventures	Warner Bros. Animation	Fox
1993 (21st)	Batman: The Animated Series	Warner Bros. Animation	Fox
1993 (21st)	The Ren & Stimpy Show	Nickelodeon	Nickelodeon
1994 (22nd)
1994 (22nd)	The Simpsons	Fox Television, Gracie Films, Film Roman	Fox
1994 (22nd)	The Ren & Stimpy Show	Nickelodeon	Nickelodeon
1994 (22nd)	Animaniacs	Warner Bros. Television Animation	Fox
1994 (22nd)	Batman: The Animated Series	Warner Bros. Television Animation	Fox
1994 (22nd)	The Critic	Gracie Films, Film Roman	ABC
1995 (23rd)
1995 (23rd)	The Simpsons	Gracie Films, Film Roman	Fox
1995 (23rd)	Batman: The Animated Series	Warner Bros. Animation	Fox
1995 (23rd)	Animaniacs	Warner Bros. Animation	Fox
1995 (23rd)	The Tick	Sunbow Productions, Graz Entertainment	Fox
1995 (23rd)	The Maxx	MTV Animation, Rough Draft Studios	MTV
1996 (24th)
1996 (24th)	The Simpsons	20th Century Fox Television	Fox
1996 (24th)	Animaniacs	Warner Bros. Television Animation	The WB
1996 (24th)	Freakazoid!	Warner Bros. Television Animation, Amblin Television	The WB
1996 (24th)	Rugrats	Nickelodeon Animation Studio, Klasky Csupo	Nickelodeon
1997 (25th)
1997 (25th)	The Simpsons	20th Century Fox, Film Roman Productions, Gracie Films, Klasky Csupo	Fox
1997 (25th)	Dexter's Laboratory	Hanna-Barbera Cartoons	Cartoon Network
1997 (25th)	King of the Hill	20th Century Fox, Film Roman Productions	Fox
1997 (25th)	The Tick	20th Century Fox, Akom Production Company, Fox Children's Network, Graz Entertainment, Sunbow Productions	Fox
1997 (25th)	Pinky and the Brain	Warner Bros., Warner Bros. Animation, Amblin Entertainment	The WB

Outstanding Achievement in an Animated Daytime Television Program

Year	Program	Studios	Network
1998 (26th)
1998 (26th)	The New Batman/Superman Adventures	Warner Bros. Television Animation	The WB
1998 (26th)	The Angry Beavers	Nickelodeon Animation Studio	Nickelodeon
1998 (26th)	Oh Yeah! Cartoons	Nickelodeon Animation Studio	Nickelodeon
1998 (26th)	Animaniacs	Warner Bros. Television Animation	The WB
1998 (26th)	Pinky and the Brain	Warner Bros. Television Animation	The WB

Outstanding Achievement in an Animated Primetime or Late Night Television Program

Year	Program	Studios	Network
1998 (26th)
1998 (26th)	The Simpsons	Gracie Films in association with 20th Century Fox Television	Fox
1998 (26th)	Dexter's Laboratory	Hanna-Barbera Cartoons	Cartoon Network
1998 (26th)	King of the Hill	20th Century Fox Television, Deedle-Dee Productions, Judgemental Films, 3 Arts Entertainment	Fox
1998 (26th)	South Park	Comedy Central	Comedy Central
1998 (26th)	A Pinky & The Brain Halloween	Warner Bros. Television Animation	The WB

Outstanding Achievement in an Animated Television Program

Year	Program	Studios	Network
1999 (27th)
1999 (27th)	The Simpsons	Gracie Films in association with 20th Century Fox Television	Fox
1999 (27th)	Batman Beyond	Warner Bros. Television Animation	The WB
1999 (27th)	The New Batman/Superman Adventures	Warner Bros. Television Animation	The WB
1999 (27th)	Futurama	The Curiosity Company in association with 20th Century Fox Television	Fox
1999 (27th)	King of the Hill	20th Century Fox Television in association with Deedle-Dee Productions, Judgemental Films, and 3 Arts Entertainment	Fox

=== 2000s ===
Outstanding Achievement in a Daytime Animated Television Program

Year	Program	Studios	Network
2000 (28th)
2000 (28th)	Mickey Mouse Works	Walt Disney Television Animation	ABC
2000 (28th)	The Angry Beavers	Nickelodeon Animation Studios	Nickelodeon
2000 (28th)	Recess	Walt Disney Television Animation	ABC
2000 (28th)	Batman Beyond	Warner Bros. Animation	The WB
2000 (28th)	Histeria!	Warner Bros. Animation	The WB
2001 (29th)
2001 (29th)	Batman Beyond	Warner Bros. Animation	The WB
2001 (29th)	Angela Anaconda	Decode Entertainment	Fox Family Channel
2001 (29th)	House of Mouse	Walt Disney Television Animation	ABC
2001 (29th)	Teacher's Pet	Walt Disney Television Animation	ABC
2001 (29th)	Poochini: Coffee Dog	Wild Brain, Inc.	Syndication

Outstanding Achievement in a Primetime or Late Night Animated Television Program
Year	Program	Studios	Network
2000 (28th)
2000 (28th)	The Simpsons	Gracie Films in Association with 20th Century Fox Television	Fox
2000 (28th)	Dexter's Laboratory	Hanna-Barbera	Cartoon Network
2000 (28th)	The PJs	Imagine Television, Will Vinton Studios	Fox
2000 (28th)	Futurama	The Curiosity Company, 20th Century Fox Television	Fox
2000 (28th)	Spy Groove	MTV Animation	MTV
2001 (29th)
2001 (29th)	The Simpsons	Gracie Films in Association with Twentieth Century Fox Television	Fox
2001 (29th)	Time Squad	Cartoon Network Studios	Cartoon Network
2001 (29th)	Futurama	The Curiosity Company in Association with Twentieth Century Fox Television	Fox
2001 (29th)	Invader Zim	Nickelodeon Animation Studios	Nickelodeon
2001 (29th)	The Fairly OddParents	Nickelodeon Animation Studios	Nickelodeon

Best Animated Television Production

Year	Program	Studios	Network
2002 (30th)
2002 (30th)	The Simpsons	Gracie Films in association with 20th Century Fox Television	Fox
2002 (30th)	Kim Possible	Walt Disney Television Animation	Disney Channel
2002 (30th)	The Flintstones: On the Rocks	Cartoon Network Studios	Cartoon Network
2002 (30th)	Futurama	The Curiosity Company in association with 20th Century Fox Television	Fox
2002 (30th)	Invader Zim	Nickelodeon	Nickelodeon
2003 (31st)
2003 (31st)	The Simpsons	Gracie Films	Fox
2003 (31st)	Captain Sturdy	Renegade Animation	Adult Swim
2003 (31st)	The Fairly OddParents	Nickelodeon	Nickelodeon
2003 (31st)	Samurai Jack	Cartoon Network Studios	Cartoon Network
2003 (31st)	Spider-Man: The New Animated Series	Adelaide Productions	MTV
2004 (32nd)
2004 (32nd)	SpongeBob SquarePants	Nickelodeon	Nickelodeon
2004 (32nd)	Foster's Home for Imaginary Friends	Cartoon Network Studios	Cartoon Network
2004 (32nd)	Star Wars: Clone Wars	Cartoon Network Studios	Cartoon Network
2004 (32nd)	My Life as a Teenage Robot	Frederator, Nickelodeon	Nickelodeon
2004 (32nd)	The Batman	Warner Bros. Animation	The WB
2005 (33rd)
2005 (33rd)	Star Wars: Clone Wars	Cartoon Network Studios	Cartoon Network
2005 (33rd)	Avatar: The Last Airbender	Nickelodeon	Nickelodeon
2005 (33rd)	My Life as a Teenage Robot	Nickelodeon, Frederator	Nickelodeon
2005 (33rd)	Foster's Home for Imaginary Friends	Cartoon Network Studios	Cartoon Network
2005 (33rd)	The Batman	Warner Bros. Animation	The WB
2006 (34th)
2006 (34th)	Foster's Home for Imaginary Friends	Cartoon Network Studios	Cartoon Network
2006 (34th)	Charlie and Lola	Tiger Aspect Productions	CBeebies
2006 (34th)	King of the Hill	Twentieth Century Fox TV	Fox
2006 (34th)	The Fairly OddParents	Nickelodeon	Nickelodeon
2006 (34th)	Wow! Wow! Wubbzy!	Bolder Media, Inc. in association with Film Roman, a Starz company	Nickelodeon
2007 (35th)
2007 (35th)	Creature Comforts America	Aardman Animations	CBS
2007 (35th)	Jane and the Dragon	Weta Productions Limited & Nelvana Limited	Qubo
2007 (35th)	Moral Orel	ShadowMachine	Adult Swim
2007 (35th)	Robot Chicken: Star Wars	ShadowMachine	Adult Swim
2007 (35th)	Kim Possible	Walt Disney Television Animation	Disney Channel
2008 (36th)
2008 (36th)	Robot Chicken: Star Wars Episode II	ShadowMachine	Adult Swim
2008 (36th)	King of the Hill	20th Century Fox TV	Fox
2008 (36th)	Moral Orel	ShadowMachine	Adult Swim
2008 (36th)	Phineas and Ferb	Disney Television Animation	Disney Channel
2008 (36th)	The Simpsons	Gracie Films, Fox TV	Fox
2009 (37th)
2009 (37th)	Prep & Landing	ABC Family, Walt Disney Animation Studios	ABC
2009 (37th)	Glenn Martin, DDS	Tornante, Cuppa Coffee Studios & Rogers Communications	Nick at Nite
2009 (37th)	Merry Madagascar	DreamWorks Animation	NBC
2009 (37th)	The Simpsons	Gracie Films	Fox

=== 2010s ===
Best Animated Television Production

Year	Program	Episode	Studios	Network
2010 (38th)
2010 (38th)	Futurama		The Curiosity Company in association with 20th Century Fox Television	Comedy Central
2010 (38th)	Kung Fu Panda Holiday		DreamWorks Animation	NBC
2010 (38th)	Scared Shrekless		DreamWorks Animation	NBC
2010 (38th)	Star Wars: The Clone Wars	"Arc Troopers"	Lucasfilm Animation, Ltd.	Cartoon Network
2010 (38th)	The Simpsons	"The Squirt and the Whale"	Gracie Films	Fox

== See also ==
- Primetime Emmy Award for Short-Format Animation
- Critics' Choice Television Award for Best Animated Series
- Primetime Emmy Award for Outstanding Animated Program
