= Annie Award for Best Animated Feature =

Annual film award

- Awarded for: Excellence in film animation
- Country: United States
- Presented by: ASIFA-Hollywood
- First award: Beauty and the Beast (1992)
- Currently held by: KPop Demon Hunters (2025)
- Website: annieawards.org

The Annie Award for Best Animated Feature is an Annie Award introduced in 1992, awarded annually to the best animated feature film.

== History ==
In 1998, the award was renamed Outstanding Achievement in an Animated Theatrical Feature, only to revert to its original title again in 2001.

== Winners and nominees ==
=== 1990s ===
Year	Film	Director(s)	Companies
1992 (20th)
1992 (20th)	Beauty and the Beast	Gary Trousdale and Kirk Wise	Walt Disney Pictures, Silver Screen Partners IV, Walt Disney Feature Animation and Buena Vista Pictures Distribution, Inc.
1992 (20th)	Bebe's Kids	Bruce W. Smith	Hyperion Studio, Hudlin Bros. and Paramount Pictures
1992 (20th)	FernGully: The Last Rainforest	Bill Kroyer	20th Century Fox, FAI Films, Kroyer Films, Interscope Communications, Youngheart Productions and Moonheart Entertainment
1993 (21st)
1993 (21st)	Aladdin	John Musker and Ron Clements	Walt Disney Pictures, Walt Disney Feature Animation and Buena Vista Pictures Distribution, Inc.
1993 (21st)	Little Nemo: Adventures in Slumberland	Masami Hata and William Hurtz	Tokyo Movie Shinsha, Toho-Towa and Hemdale Film Corporation
1993 (21st)	Once Upon a Forest	Charles Grosvenor	20th Century Fox, Hanna-Barbera Productions, Endangered Film Company and ITV Cymru Wales (HTV)
1994 (22nd)
1994 (22nd)	The Lion King	Roger Allers and Rob Minkoff	Walt Disney Pictures, Walt Disney Feature Animation and Buena Vista Pictures Distribution, Inc.
1994 (22nd)	Batman: Mask of the Phantasm	Eric Radomski and Bruce Timm	Warner Bros. Animation, Dong Yang Animation, Spectrum Animation and Warner Bros. Pictures
1994 (22nd)	The Nightmare Before Christmas	Henry Selick	Walt Disney Pictures, Touchstone Pictures, Skellington Productions, Tim Burton Productions, DiNovi Pictures and Buena Vista Pictures Distribution, Inc.
1995 (23rd)
1995 (23rd)	Pocahontas	Mike Gabriel and Eric Goldberg	Walt Disney Pictures, Walt Disney Feature Animation and Buena Vista Pictures Distribution, Inc.
1995 (23rd)	A Goofy Movie	Kevin Lima	Walt Disney Pictures, Walt Disney Television Animation and Buena Vista Pictures Distribution, Inc.
1995 (23rd)	The Swan Princess	Richard Rich	Rich Animation Studios, Nest Entertainment and New Line Cinema
1996 (24th)
1996 (24th)	Toy Story	John Lasseter	Walt Disney Pictures, Pixar Animation Studios and Buena Vista Pictures Distribution, Inc.
1996 (24th)	Balto	Simon Wells	Universal Pictures, Amblimation and Amblin Entertainment
1996 (24th)	Ghost in the Shell	Mamoru Oshii	Shochiku, Production I.G., Bandai Visual and Manga Entertainment
1996 (24th)	The Hunchback of Notre Dame	Gary Trousdale and Kirk Wise	Walt Disney Pictures, Walt Disney Feature Animation and Buena Vista Pictures Distribution, Inc.
1996 (24th)	James and the Giant Peach	Henry Selick	Walt Disney Pictures, Skellington Productions, Allied Filmmakers, Tim Burton Productions, DiNovi Pictures and Buena Vista Pictures Distribution, Inc.
1997 (25th)
1997 (25th)	Cats Don't Dance	Mark Dindal	Warner Bros. Pictures, Turner Feature Animation, David Kirschner Productions and Warner Bros. Family Entertainment
1997 (25th)	Hercules	John Musker and Ron Clements	Walt Disney Pictures, Walt Disney Feature Animation and Buena Vista Pictures Distribution, Inc.
1997 (25th)	Space Jam	Joe Pytka	Warner Bros. Pictures, Warner Bros. Feature Animation, Northern Lights Entertainment, Courtside Seats Productions and Warner Bros. Family Entertainment
1998 (26th)
1998 (26th)	Mulan	Barry Cook and Tony Bancroft	Walt Disney Pictures, Walt Disney Feature Animation and Buena Vista Pictures Distribution, Inc.
1998 (26th)	Anastasia	Don Bluth and Gary Goldman	20th Century Fox, Fox Animation Studios, The Big Gun Project and Fox Family Films
1998 (26th)	Quest for Camelot	Frederik Du Chau	Warner Bros. Feature Animation and Warner Bros. Pictures
1998 (26th)	I Married a Strange Person!	Bill Plympton	Italtoons Corporation and Lions Gate Films
1999 (27th)
1999 (27th)	The Iron Giant	Brad Bird	Warner Bros. Feature Animation and Warner Bros. Pictures
1999 (27th)	A Bug's Life	John Lasseter	Walt Disney Pictures, Pixar Animation Studios and Buena Vista Pictures Distribution, Inc.
1999 (27th)	The Prince of Egypt	Brenda Chapman, Steve Hickner, and Simon Wells	DreamWorks Animation and DreamWorks Pictures
1999 (27th)	South Park: Bigger, Longer & Uncut	Trey Parker	Paramount Pictures, Warner Bros. Pictures, Comedy Central Films, Scott Rudin Productions and South Park Studios
1999 (27th)	Tarzan	Kevin Lima and Chris Buck	Walt Disney Pictures, Walt Disney Feature Animation and Buena Vista Pictures Distribution, Inc.

=== 2000s ===
Year	Film	Director(s)	Companies
2000 (28th)
2000 (28th)	Toy Story 2	John Lasseter	Walt Disney Pictures, Pixar Animation Studios and Buena Vista Pictures Distribution, Inc.
2000 (28th)	Chicken Run	Peter Lord and Nick Park	Aardman Animations, DreamWorks Animation, Pathé, Allied Filmmakers and DreamWorks Pictures
2000 (28th)	Fantasia 2000	Don Hahn, Pixote Hunt, Hendel Butoy, Eric Goldberg, James Algar, Francis Glebas, Paul Brizzi, and Gaëtan Brizzi	Walt Disney Pictures, Walt Disney Feature Animation and Buena Vista Pictures Distribution, Inc.
2000 (28th)	The Road to El Dorado	Eric "Bibo" Bergeron and Don Paul	DreamWorks Animation and DreamWorks Pictures
2000 (28th)	Titan A.E.	Don Bluth and Gary Goldman	20th Century Fox Animation, Fox Animation Studios, David Kirschner Productions and 20th Century Fox
2001 (29th)
2001 (29th)	Shrek	Andrew Adamson and Vicky Jenson	DreamWorks Animation, PDI/DreamWorks and DreamWorks Pictures
2001 (29th)	Blood: The Last Vampire	Hiroyuki Kitakubo	IG Plus, Production I.G., Aniplex and Sony Computer Entertainment
2001 (29th)	The Emperor's New Groove	Mark Dindal	Walt Disney Pictures, Walt Disney Feature Animation and Buena Vista Pictures Distribution, Inc.
2001 (29th)	Osmosis Jones	Bobby Farrelly, Peter Farrelly, Tom Sito, and Piet Kroon	Warner Bros. Pictures, Warner Bros. Feature Animation and Conundrum Entertainment
2002 (30th)
2002 (30th)	Spirited Away	Hayao Miyazaki	Studio Ghibli and Toho
2002 (30th)	Ice Age	Chris Wedge	20th Century Fox Animation, Blue Sky Studios and 20th Century Fox
2002 (30th)	Lilo & Stitch	Chris Sanders and Dean DeBlois	Walt Disney Pictures, Walt Disney Feature Animation and Buena Vista Pictures Distribution, Inc.
2002 (30th)	Monsters, Inc.	Pete Docter	Pixar Animation Studios, Walt Disney Pictures and Buena Vista Pictures Distribution, Inc.
2002 (30th)	Spirit: Stallion of the Cimarron	Kelly Asbury and Lorna Cook	DreamWorks Animation and DreamWorks Pictures
2003 (31st)
2003 (31st)	Finding Nemo	Andrew Stanton	Pixar Animation Studios, Walt Disney Pictures and Buena Vista Pictures Distribution, Inc.
2003 (31st)	Brother Bear	Aaron Blaise and Robert Walker	Walt Disney Pictures, Walt Disney Feature Animation and Buena Vista Pictures Distribution, Inc.
2003 (31st)	Looney Tunes: Back In Action	Joe Dante	Warner Bros. Pictures, Warner Bros. Feature Animation, Baltimore/Spring Creek Productions, Goldman Pictures and Lonely Film Productions GmbH & Co. KG.
2003 (31st)	Millennium Actress	Satoshi Kon	Go Fish Pictures, Bandai Visual Company, Chiyoko Committee, Genco, Kadokawa Shoten Publishing Co., Madhouse, Inc., WOWOW and The Klockworx
2003 (31st)	The Triplets of Belleville	Sylvain Chomet	Les Armateurs, Champion, Vivi Film, France 3 Cinéma, RGP France, BBC Bristol, BBC Worldwide, Diaphana Films, Cinéart, Alliance Atlantis and Tartan Films
2004 (32nd)
2004 (32nd)	The Incredibles	Brad Bird	Pixar Animation Studios, Walt Disney Pictures and Buena Vista Pictures Distribution, Inc.
2004 (32nd)	Ghost in the Shell 2: Innocence	Mamoru Oshii	Go Fish Pictures, Production I.G and Toho
2004 (32nd)	Shrek 2	Andrew Adamson, Kelly Asbury, and Conrad Vernon	DreamWorks Animation, PDI/DreamWorks and DreamWorks Pictures
2004 (32nd)	The SpongeBob SquarePants Movie	Stephen Hillenburg	Paramount Pictures, Nickelodeon Movies and United Plankton Pictures
2005 (33rd)
2005 (33rd)	Wallace & Gromit: The Curse of the Were-Rabbit	Nick Park and Steve Box	Aardman Animations, DreamWorks Animation and DreamWorks Pictures
2005 (33rd)	Chicken Little	Mark Dindal	Walt Disney Pictures, Walt Disney Feature Animation and Buena Vista Pictures Distribution, Inc.
2005 (33rd)	Corpse Bride	Mike Johnson and Tim Burton	Laika Entertainment, Tim Burton Productions, Patalex II Productions and Warner Bros. Pictures
2005 (33rd)	Howl's Moving Castle	Hayao Miyazaki	Studio Ghibli and Toho
2005 (33rd)	Madagascar	Eric Darnell and Tom McGrath	DreamWorks Animation, PDI/DreamWorks and DreamWorks Pictures
2006 (34th)
2006 (34th)	Cars	John Lasseter	Pixar Animation Studios, Walt Disney Pictures and Buena Vista Pictures Distribution, Inc.
2006 (34th)	Happy Feet	George Miller	Warner Bros. Pictures, Animal Logic, Kennedy Miller Productions, Village Roadshow Pictures and Kingdom Feature Productions
2006 (34th)	Monster House	Gil Kenan	Amblin Entertainment, Columbia Pictures, ImageMovers, Relativity Media and Sony Pictures Releasing
2006 (34th)	Open Season	Jill Culton and Roger Allers	Columbia Pictures, Sony Pictures Animation and Sony Pictures Releasing
2006 (34th)	Over the Hedge	Tim Johnson	DreamWorks Animation and Paramount Pictures
2007 (35th)
2007 (35th)	Ratatouille	Brad Bird	Pixar Animation Studios, Walt Disney Pictures and Buena Vista Pictures Distribution, Inc.
2007 (35th)	Bee Movie	Simon J. Smith and Steve Hickner	DreamWorks Animation, Columbus 81 Productions and Paramount Pictures
2007 (35th)	Persepolis	Marjane Satrapi and Vincent Paronnaud	2.4.7. Films, France 3 Cinéma, The Kennedy/Marshall Company, Franche Connection Animations, Diaphana Distribution, Celluloid Dreams, Soficinéma, Sofica Europacorp and Sony Pictures Classics
2007 (35th)	The Simpsons Movie	David Silverman	20th Century Fox Animation, Gracie Films, The Curiosity Company and 20th Century Fox
2007 (35th)	Surf's Up	Ash Brannon and Chris Buck	Columbia Pictures, Sony Pictures Animation and Sony Pictures Releasing
2008 (36th)
2008 (36th)	Kung Fu Panda	John Stevenson and Mark Osborne	DreamWorks Animation, Dragon Warrior Media and Paramount Pictures
2008 (36th)	$9.99	Tatia Rosenthal	Sherman Pictures, Lama Films and the Australian Film Finance Corporation
2008 (36th)	Bolt	Chris Williams and Byron Howard	Walt Disney Animation Studios, Walt Disney Pictures and Walt Disney Studios Motion Pictures
2008 (36th)	WALL-E	Andrew Stanton	Pixar Animation Studios, Walt Disney Pictures and Walt Disney Studios Motion Pictures
2008 (36th)	Waltz with Bashir	Ari Folman	Bridgit Folman Film Gang, Les Films d'Ici, Razor Film Produktion GmbH and Sony Pictures Classics
2009 (37th)
2009 (37th)	Up	Pete Docter	Pixar Animation Studios, Walt Disney Pictures and Walt Disney Studios Motion Pictures
2009 (37th)	Cloudy with a Chance of Meatballs	Phil Lord and Christopher Miller	Columbia Pictures, Sony Pictures Animation and Sony Pictures Releasing
2009 (37th)	Coraline	Henry Selick	Pandemonium, Laika and Focus Features
2009 (37th)	Fantastic Mr. Fox	Wes Anderson	20th Century Fox, Indian Paintbrush, Regency Enterprises, New Regency Productions and American Empirical Pictures
2009 (37th)	The Princess and the Frog	John Musker and Ron Clements	Walt Disney Animation Studios, Walt Disney Pictures and Walt Disney Studios Motion Pictures
2009 (37th)	The Secret of Kells	Tomm Moore and Nora Twomey	Les Armateurs, Vivi Film, Cartoon Saloon, France 2 Cinéma, Gébéka Films, Kinepolis Film Distribution and Buena Vista International

=== 2010s ===
Year	Film	Director(s)	Companies
2010 (38th)
2010 (38th)	How to Train Your Dragon	Chris Sanders and Dean DeBlois	DreamWorks Animation and Paramount Pictures
2010 (38th)	Despicable Me	Chris Renaud and Pierre Coffin	Illumination Entertainment and Universal Pictures
2010 (38th)	The Illusionist	Sylvain Chomet	Pathé, Django Films, Ciné B, France 3 Cinéma, Canal+, CinéCinéma, France Télévisions, Allied Filmmakers and Ink.Digital
2010 (38th)	Tangled	Nathan Greno and Byron Howard	Walt Disney Animation Studios, Walt Disney Pictures and Walt Disney Studios Motion Pictures
2010 (38th)	Toy Story 3	Lee Unkrich	Pixar Animation Studios, Walt Disney Pictures and Walt Disney Studios Motion Pictures
2011 (39th)
2011 (39th)	Rango	Gore Verbinski	Nickelodeon Movies, Paramount Pictures, Blind Wink Productions, GK Films and Industrial Light & Magic
2011 (39th)	The Adventures of Tintin	Steven Spielberg	Amblin Entertainment, The Kennedy/Marshall Company, WingNut Films, Nickelodeon Movies, Hemisphere Media Capital, Paramount Pictures and Columbia Pictures
2011 (39th)	Arthur Christmas	Sarah Smith	Aardman Animations, Columbia Pictures, Sony Pictures Animation and Sony Pictures Releasing
2011 (39th)	Cars 2	John Lasseter	Pixar Animation Studios, Walt Disney Pictures and Walt Disney Studios Motion Pictures
2011 (39th)	A Cat in Paris	Jean-Loup Felicioli and Alain Gagnol	Folimage, Lunanime, Lumière, Digit Anima, France 3 Cinéma, Rhône-Alpes Cinéma, RTBF, Gébéka Films, Benelux Film Distributors and Agora Films
2011 (39th)	Chico & Rita	Fernando Trueba, Javier Mariscal, and Tono Errando	Isle of Man Film, CinemaNX, Estudio Mariscal, Fernando Trueba Producciones Cinematográficas, Generalitat de Catalunya - Institut Català de les Indústries Culturals (ICIC), HanWay Films, ICF Institut Català de Finances, Instituto de Crédito Oficial (ICO), Instituto de la Cinematografía y de las Artes Audiovisuales (ICAA), Magic Light Pictures, Mesfilms, Televisió de Catalunya (TV3) and Televisión Española (TVE)
2011 (39th)	Kung Fu Panda 2	Jennifer Yuh Nelson	DreamWorks Animation and Paramount Pictures
2011 (39th)	Puss in Boots	Chris Miller	DreamWorks Animation and Paramount Pictures
2011 (39th)	Rio	Carlos Saldanha	20th Century Fox Animation, Blue Sky Studios and 20th Century Fox
2011 (39th)	Wrinkles	Ignacio Ferreras	Cromosoma TV produccions, Elephant in the Black Box and Perro Verde Films
2012 (40th)
2012 (40th)	Wreck-It Ralph	Rich Moore	Walt Disney Animation Studios, Walt Disney Pictures and Walt Disney Studios Motion Pictures
2012 (40th)	Brave	Mark Andrews and Brenda Chapman	Pixar Animation Studios, Walt Disney Pictures and Walt Disney Studios Motion Pictures
2012 (40th)	Frankenweenie	Tim Burton	Walt Disney Pictures, Tim Burton Productions and Walt Disney Studios Motion Pictures
2012 (40th)	Hotel Transylvania	Genndy Tartakovsky	Columbia Pictures, Sony Pictures Animation and Sony Pictures Releasing
2012 (40th)	ParaNorman	Sam Fell and Chris Butler	Laika and Focus Features
2012 (40th)	The Pirates! In an Adventure with Scientists!	Peter Lord	Aardman Animations, Columbia Pictures, Sony Pictures Animation and Sony Pictures Releasing
2012 (40th)	The Rabbi's Cat	Joann Sfar and Antoine Delesvaux	Autochenille Production, TF1 Droits Audiovisuels, France 3 Cinéma, Canal+, France 3, CinéCinéma, Sofica Valor 7, Fondation GAN pour le Cinéma, UGC Distribution and Société des Producteurs de Cinéma et de Télévision (Procirep)
2012 (40th)	Rise of the Guardians	Peter Ramsey	DreamWorks Animation and Paramount Pictures
2013 (41st)
2013 (41st)	Frozen	Chris Buck and Jennifer Lee	Walt Disney Animation Studios, Walt Disney Pictures and Walt Disney Studios Motion Pictures
2013 (41st)	The Croods	Chris Sanders and Kirk DeMicco	DreamWorks Animation and 20th Century Fox
2013 (41st)	Despicable Me 2	Chris Renaud and Pierre Coffin	Illumination Entertainment and Universal Pictures
2013 (41st)	Ernest & Celestine	Stéphane Aubier, Vincent Patar, and Benjamin Renner	Les Armateurs, La Parti Productions, Maybe Movies, Melusine Productions, StudioCanal, Superprod, GKIDS and Cinéart
2013 (41st)	A Letter to Momo	Hiroyuki Okiura	Production I.G, Momo e no Tegami Production Committee, Bandai Visual Company, Chubu-nippon Broadcasting Company (CBC), Chugoku Broadcasting (RCC), Horipro, JR Kikaku, Kadokawa Pictures, Kadokawa Shoten Publishing Co., Mainichi Broadcasting System (MBS), Mainichi Newspapers, Oriental Light and Magic (OLM), Tokyo Broadcasting System (TBS), Tokyu Recreation and Yahoo Japan
2013 (41st)	Monsters University	Dan Scanlon	Pixar Animation Studios, Walt Disney Pictures and Walt Disney Studios Motion Pictures
2013 (41st)	The Wind Rises	Hayao Miyazaki	Studio Ghibli, Nippon Television Network (NTV), Dentsu, Hakuhodo DY Media Partners, Walt Disney Animation Japan, D-Rights, Toho, KDDI Corporation and The Wind Rises Production Committee
2014 (42nd)
2014 (42nd)	How to Train Your Dragon 2	Dean DeBlois	DreamWorks Animation and 20th Century Fox
2014 (42nd)	Big Hero 6	Don Hall and Chris Williams	Walt Disney Animation Studios, Walt Disney Pictures and Walt Disney Studios Motion Pictures
2014 (42nd)	The Book of Life	Jorge R. Gutierrez	20th Century Fox, 20th Century Fox Animation, Chatrone, Mexopolis and Reel FX Animation Studios
2014 (42nd)	The Boxtrolls	Graham Annable and Anthony Stacchi	Laika and Focus Features
2014 (42nd)	Cheatin'	Bill Plympton	Bill Plympton Studios
2014 (42nd)	The Lego Movie	Phil Lord and Christopher Miller	Warner Bros. Pictures, Warner Animation Group, Village Roadshow Pictures, RatPac-Dune Entertainment, Lego System A/S, Vertigo Entertainment, Lin Pictures and Animal Logic
2014 (42nd)	Song of the Sea	Tomm Moore	Cartoon Saloon, Melusine Productions, Big Farm, Superprod, Noerlum Studios, Bord Scannán na hÉireann / The Irish Film Board, Magellan Films, West Danish Film Fund, Haut et Court, Orange Cinéma Séries, Det Danske Filminstitut, Wallimage, VOO, Centre du Cinéma et de l'Audiovisuel de la Fédération Wallonie-Bruxelles, Broadcasting Authority of Ireland, Eurimages and Luxembourg Film Fund
2014 (42nd)	The Tale of the Princess Kaguya	Isao Takahata	Studio Ghibli, Dentsu, Hakuhodo DY Media Partners, KDDI Corporation, Mitsubishi, Nippon Television Network (NTV), D-Rights and Toho
2015 (43rd)
2015 (43rd)	Inside Out	Pete Docter	Pixar Animation Studios, Walt Disney Pictures and Walt Disney Studios Motion Pictures
2015 (43rd)	Anomalisa	Charlie Kaufman and Duke Johnson	Paramount Pictures, Paramount Animation, HanWay Films, Harmonius Claptrap, Starburns Industries and Snoot Entertainment
2015 (43rd)	The Good Dinosaur	Peter Sohn	Pixar Animation Studios, Walt Disney Pictures and Walt Disney Studios Motion Pictures
2015 (43rd)	The Peanuts Movie	Steve Martino	20th Century Fox Animation, Blue Sky Studios, Feigco Entertainment and 20th Century Fox
2015 (43rd)	Shaun the Sheep Movie	Mark Burton and Richard Starzak	Aardman Animations, Anton Capital Entertainment and StudioCanal
2016 (44th)
2016 (44th)	Zootopia	Byron Howard and Rich Moore	Walt Disney Animation Studios, Walt Disney Pictures and Walt Disney Studios Motion Pictures
2016 (44th)	Finding Dory	Andrew Stanton	Pixar Animation Studios, Walt Disney Pictures and Walt Disney Studios Motion Pictures
2016 (44th)	Kubo and the Two Strings	Travis Knight	Laika and Focus Features
2016 (44th)	Kung Fu Panda 3	Jennifer Yuh Nelson and Alessandro Carloni	DreamWorks Animation and 20th Century Fox
2016 (44th)	Moana	John Musker and Ron Clements	Walt Disney Animation Studios, Walt Disney Pictures and Walt Disney Studios Motion Pictures
2017 (45th)
2017 (45th)	Coco	Lee Unkrich	Pixar Animation Studios, Walt Disney Pictures and Walt Disney Studios Motion Pictures
2017 (45th)	The Boss Baby	Tom McGrath	DreamWorks Animation and 20th Century Fox
2017 (45th)	Captain Underpants: The First Epic Movie	David Soren	DreamWorks Animation and 20th Century Fox
2017 (45th)	Cars 3	Brian Fee	Pixar Animation Studios, Walt Disney Pictures and Walt Disney Studios Motion Pictures
2017 (45th)	Despicable Me 3	Pierre Coffin and Kyle Balda	Illumination Entertainment and Universal Pictures
2018 (46th)
2018 (46th)	Spider-Man: Into the Spider-Verse	Bob Persichetti, Peter Ramsey, and Rodney Rothman	Columbia Pictures, Marvel Entertainment, Sony Pictures Animation, Pascal Pictures, Arad Productions, Lord Miller Productions and Sony Pictures Releasing
2018 (46th)	Early Man	Nick Park	Aardman Animations, StudioCanal and the British Film Institute
2018 (46th)	Incredibles 2	Brad Bird	Pixar Animation Studios, Walt Disney Pictures and Walt Disney Studios Motion Pictures
2018 (46th)	Isle of Dogs	Wes Anderson	Fox Searchlight Pictures, Indian Paintbrush, American Empirical Pictures, Scott Rudin Productions and Studio Babelsberg
2018 (46th)	Ralph Breaks the Internet	Rich Moore	Walt Disney Animation Studios, Walt Disney Pictures and Walt Disney Studios Motion Pictures
2019 (47th)
2019 (47th)	Klaus	Sergio Pablos	Netflix Animation, The SPA Studios, Atresmedia Cine and Netflix
2019 (47th)	Frozen 2	Chris Buck and Jennifer Lee	Walt Disney Animation Studios, Walt Disney Pictures and Walt Disney Studios Motion Pictures
2019 (47th)	How to Train Your Dragon: The Hidden World	Dean DeBlois	DreamWorks Animation and Universal Pictures
2019 (47th)	Missing Link	Chris Butler	Laika, Annapurna Pictures and United Artists Releasing
2019 (47th)	Toy Story 4	Josh Cooley	Pixar Animation Studios, Walt Disney Pictures and Walt Disney Studios Motion Pictures

=== 2020s ===
Year	Film	Director(s)	Companies
2020 (48th)
2020 (48th)	Soul	Pete Docter	Pixar Animation Studios, Walt Disney Pictures and Walt Disney Studios Motion Pictures
2020 (48th)	The Croods: A New Age	Joel Crawford	DreamWorks Animation and Universal Pictures
2020 (48th)	Onward	Dan Scanlon	Pixar Animation Studios, Walt Disney Pictures and Walt Disney Studios Motion Pictures
2020 (48th)	Trolls World Tour	Walt Dohrn	DreamWorks Animation and Universal Pictures
2020 (48th)	The Willoughbys	Kris Pearn	Netflix Animation, Bron Studios, Creative Wealth Media Finance and Netflix
2021 (49th)
2021 (49th)	The Mitchells vs. the Machines	Mike Rianda	Columbia Pictures, Sony Pictures Animation, Lord Miller Productions, One Cool Films and Netflix
2021 (49th)	Encanto	Jared Bush and Byron Howard	Walt Disney Animation Studios, Walt Disney Pictures and Walt Disney Studios Motion Pictures
2021 (49th)	Luca	Enrico Casarosa	Pixar Animation Studios, Walt Disney Pictures and Walt Disney Studios Motion Pictures
2021 (49th)	Raya and the Last Dragon	Don Hall and Carlos López Estrada	Walt Disney Animation Studios, Walt Disney Pictures and Walt Disney Studios Motion Pictures
2021 (49th)	Sing 2	Garth Jennings	Illumination and Universal Pictures
2022 (50th)
2022 (50th)	Guillermo del Toro's Pinocchio	Guillermo del Toro and Mark Gustafson	Netflix Animation, Necropia Entertainment, Double Dare You (DDY), ShadowMachine, The Jim Henson Company and Netflix
2022 (50th)	Puss in Boots: The Last Wish	Joel Crawford	DreamWorks Animation and Universal Pictures
2022 (50th)	The Sea Beast	Chris Williams	Netflix Animation, Sony Pictures Imageworks and Netflix
2022 (50th)	Turning Red	Domee Shi	Pixar Animation Studios, Walt Disney Pictures and Walt Disney Studios Motion Pictures
2022 (50th)	Wendell & Wild	Henry Selick	Netflix Animation, Monkeypaw Productions, Gotham Group, Artists First, SIF 309 Film Music and Netflix
2023 (51st)
2023 (51st)	Spider-Man: Across the Spider-Verse	Joaquim Dos Santos, Kemp Powers, and Justin K. Thompson	Columbia Pictures, Marvel Entertainment, Sony Pictures Animation, Pascal Pictures, Lord Miller Productions, Avi Arad Productions and Sony Pictures Releasing
2023 (51st)	The Boy and the Heron	Hayao Miyazaki	Studio Ghibli and Toho
2023 (51st)	Nimona	Nick Bruno and Troy Quane	Annapurna Pictures, Annapurna Animation, Blue Sky Studios, DNEG Animation, Vertigo Entertainment and Netflix
2023 (51st)	Suzume	Makoto Shinkai	CoMix Wave Films Inc., STORY inc., Aniplex, East Japan Marketing & Communications Inc., Kadokawa, Lawson Entertainment, Nova Media, Voque Ting and Toho
2023 (51st)	Teenage Mutant Ninja Turtles: Mutant Mayhem	Jeff Rowe	Paramount Pictures, Nickelodeon Movies, Point Grey Pictures, Nickelodeon Animation Studios, Mikros Animation and Image Comics
2024 (52nd)
2024 (52nd)	The Wild Robot	Chris Sanders	DreamWorks Animation and Universal Pictures
2024 (52nd)	Inside Out 2	Kelsey Mann	Pixar Animation Studios, Walt Disney Pictures and Walt Disney Studios Motion Pictures
2024 (52nd)	Kung Fu Panda 4	Mike Mitchell	DreamWorks Animation and Universal Pictures
2024 (52nd)	That Christmas	Simon Otto	Locksmith Animation and Netflix
2024 (52nd)	Ultraman: Rising	Shannon Tindle	Netflix Animation, Tsuburaya Productions, Industrial Light & Magic and Netflix
2024 (52nd)	Wallace & Gromit: Vengeance Most Fowl	Nick Park and Merlin Crossingham	Aardman Animations, Netflix and BBC
2025 (53rd)
2025 (53rd)	KPop Demon Hunters	Maggie Kang and Chris Appelhans	Sony Pictures Animation and Netflix
2025 (53rd)	Elio	Madeline Sharafian, Domee Shi, and Adrian Molina	Pixar Animation Studios, Walt Disney Pictures and Walt Disney Studios Motion Pictures
2025 (53rd)	Little Amélie or the Character of Rain	Maïlys Vallade and Liane-Cho Han	Maybe Movies and Ikki Films
2025 (53rd)	The Bad Guys 2	Pierre Perifel	DreamWorks Animation and Universal Pictures
2025 (53rd)	Zootopia 2	Jared Bush and Byron Howard	Walt Disney Animation Studios, Walt Disney Pictures and Walt Disney Studios Motion Pictures

== Multiple wins and nominations ==
Wins by Film franchises
Wins	Film franchises
2	How to Train Your Dragon
2	Toy Story
2	Spider-Verse

Nominations by Film franchises
Nominations	Film franchises
4	Shrek
4	Toy Story
4	Kung Fu Panda
3	Despicable Me
3	How to Train Your Dragon
3	Cars
3	Wallace & Gromit
2	The Croods
2	Frozen
2	Ghost in the Shell
2	The Incredibles
2	Inside Out
2	Monsters, Inc.
2	Spider-Verse
2	Wreck-It Ralph
2	Zootopia

Wins by Studio
Wins	Studio
10	Pixar Animation Studios
8	Walt Disney Studios
6	DreamWorks Animation
4	Sony Pictures Animation
2	Netflix Animation
2	Warner Bros. Animation

Nominations by Studio
Nominations	Studio
35	Walt Disney Studios
26	Pixar Animation Studios
26	DreamWorks Animation
10	Sony Pictures Animation
9	Warner Bros.
8	20th Century Fox
7	Aardman Animations
7	Netflix Animation
6	Laika
4	GKIDS
4	Studio Ghibli
4	Paramount Pictures
4	Illumination Entertainment
3	Blue Sky Studios
3	Columbia Pictures
3	Nickelodeon Movies
3	PDI/DreamWorks
2	Cartoon Saloon
2	Touchstone Pictures
2	Go Fish Pictures
2	Les Armateurs
2	Skellington Productions
2	Focus Features
2	Production I.G
2	Universal Pictures
2	Amblin Entertainment
2	Fox Animation Studios

== See also ==
- Academy Award for Best Animated Feature
- Golden Globe Award for Best Animated Feature Film
- Annie Award for Best Animated Feature — Independent
- Producers Guild of America Award for Best Animated Motion Picture
- BAFTA Award for Best Animated Film
- Japan Media Arts Festival
- Los Angeles Film Critics Association Award for Best Animated Film
- Animation Kobe
- Tokyo Anime Award
- Washington D.C. Area Film Critics Association Award for Best Animated Feature
- Annecy Cristal for a Feature Film
