= Nexus Studios =

Interactive production studio

- Industry: Animation, Advertising, Interactive, Film, Music Video,
- Founded: 2000
- Headquarters: London and Los Angeles
- Area served: Global
- Website: nexusstudios.com

Nexus Studios is an animation, VFX, film and interactive production studio based in London and LA. It was founded in 2000 by Charlotte Bavasso and Christopher O'Reilly.

Nexus Studios has a team of production staff, animators, technical directors, coders, illustrators and designers, backed by a 180-seat studio.

Their work includes Academy Award nominated animation, Grammy nominated music videos, D&AD Black pencil and triple Cannes Grand Prix winning commercials and D&AD white pencil winning digital and immersive experiences.

- Awards

Year	Name	Award/category	Project
2003	D&AD Awards	The People's Pencil	Catch Me If You Can
2004	Campaign Magazine	Commercial of the Year	Honda Grrr
2005	GRAMMY Awards	Nomination for Gold Award for Best TV Commercial/Cinema Commercial	Franz Ferdinand Take Me Out
2005	Creative Circle	Platinum Award, 5 Gold awards	Honda Grrr
2005	British Arrows	Best Commercial, Best Animation 3 Gold Awards	Honda Grrr
2005	Cannes Lions	Grand Prix, Titanium Lion, Journalists' Award	Honda Grrr
2005	D&AD Awards	2 x Black Pencils	Honda Grrr
2005	Clio Awards	Grand Clio	Honda Grrr
2005	Andy Awards	Grandy at the Andys	Honda Grrr
2007	Cannes Lions	Gold Award	Coca-Cola Videogame
2007	British Arrows	Silver Award/ Best International Commercial	Coca-Cola Videogame
2008	Academy Award	Nomination for Best Animated Short	This Way Up
2009	Sundance Film Festival	Nomination for Best Animated Short	This Way Up
2009	Adweek	Commercial of the Decade	Honda Grrr
2010	D&AD	Yellow Pencil for animation	Comcast Town
2011	TED	Ted's Top 10 Ads worth spreading	The Chase Intel
2011	TED	Ted's Top 10 Ads worth spreading	Nike Foundation Girl Effect
2011	British Arrows	Nominated for Best Animation	Chipotle Back to the Start
2012	Andy Awards	Grandy at the Andys	Chipotle Back to the Start
2012	Clio Awards	Film Grand Clio, Gold for Adapted Music	Chipotle Back to the Start
2012	AICP	Best in Show in Advertising Excellence/Single Commercial, Visual Style	Chipotle Back to the Start
2012	Cannes Lions	Gold for Animation in Film Craft, Grand Prix x2 for Film and Branded Content & Entertainment	Chipotle Back to the Start
2012	ADC	4 x Gold (Advertising, Interactive and Motion Categories)	Chipotle Back to the Start
2012	British Arrows	Best 3D Commercial	Coca-Cola The Siege
2012	British Arrows	Best Web Based Film	The Chase Intel
2012	Clio Awards	Hall of Fame	Honda Grrr
2013	Shots Awards	TV Commercial of the Year	Honda Hands
2013	British Arrows Craft Awards	Gold	Honda Hands
2013	TED	Ted's Top 10 Ads worth spreading	Honda Hands
2014	Cannes Lions	Silver Lions x2, VFX and Sound Design	Honda Hands
2014	D&AD	Yellow Pencil, Innovative Use of Technology	Photon Shower
2016	Rhode Island Film Festival	Grand Prize for Animated Short	To Build a Fire
2017	SXSW	Jury Award for Best Animated Short	Wednesday With Goddard
2017	Clio Awards	Bronze for Film Technique (Animation)	Google I/O, The Story of An Idea
2017	BAFTA (Children)	Nomination for Best Interactive	Gruffalo Spotter AR Experience
2017	BAFTA	Nomination for Best Animated Short	To Build A Fire
2017	D&AD	Wooden pencil for Animation & Illustration for Digital Marketing	Tripl Stitched
2018	Primetime Creative Arts Emmy Awards	Nomination for Outstanding Interactive Programme	Google Spotlight Stories, Back to the Moon
2018	Webby Awards	Best Overall for Best Use of GPS or Location Technology	HotStepper
2018	Cannes Lions	Bronze for multi-platform social	UEFA Together #WePlayStrong
2018	D&AD	Wood Pencil for Art Direction for Film Advertising	BBC Winter Olympics The Fearless Are Here
2018	Rhode Island Film Festival	First Prize for Best Comedy Short	Fern
2018	British Arrows	Nomination for Branded Content	Robot & Scarecrow
2018	Telly Awards	2 x awards: Best use of VR & Direction	Google Spotlight Stories Rain or Shine
2018	BAFTA TV Craft Awards	Best Title & Graphic Identity	BBC Winter Olympics The Fearless Are Here
2018	Annie Awards	3 x nominations for: Production Design, Best Character Animation and Best Use of Music	Google Spotlight Stories Back to the Moon
2018	Annie Awards	Nominated for Best Animated TV/Broadcast Commercial	BBC Winter Olympics The Fearless Are Here
2018	Lovie Awards	Gold for Best Use of AR, People's Lovie Award and Bronze for Animation & Bronze for Best Use of GPS/Location Mapping	BBC Civilisations AR, Google Spotlight Stories, Back to the Moon & Hotstepper
2018	Webby Awards	Public Service & Activism	Google Creative Lab Notable Women
2018	Peabody Awards	Excellence, innovation and impact in digital storytelling	BBC Civilisations AR
2019	British Arrows	2 x nominations for Animation: 2D	BBC Winter Olympics The Fearless Are Here & Wimbledon #TakeOnHistory
2022	BAFTA TV Craft Awards	Best Title & Graphic Identity	BBC Summer Olympics Let's Go There
