= 20th Annie Awards =

US media awards ceremony held in 1992

20th
Annie Awards

November 14, 1992

Best Feature Film:
Beauty and the Beast

Best Television Program:
The Simpsons

The 20th Annie Awards was the first Annie Awards ceremony which recognized the achievement of animation in film and television as a whole. For two decades, the awards ceremony only recognized individual achievement. The ceremony honored the outstanding accomplishments in animation in 1991.

== Production Categories ==
Winners are listed first, highlighted in boldface, and indicated with a double dagger (‡).

**Best Animated Feature**: **Beauty and the Beast – Walt Disney Pictures**‡; Bebe's Kids – Hyperion, Paramount; FernGully: The Last Rainforest – 20th Century Fox, FAI Films, Kroyer Films	**Best Animated Television Program**: **The Simpsons – Fox**‡; TaleSpin – Walt Disney Television; The Ren & Stimpy Show – Nickelodeon; Darkwing Duck – Walt Disney Television Animation; Tiny Toon Adventures – Amblin/Warner Bros. Animation
**Best Animated Television Commercial**: **Hare Jordan – Nike, Warner Bros. Animation**‡; Car Cover – Lexus, Rhythm & Hues, Inc.; Cheese Pizza – Ritz Bitz Sandwich Crackers, Will Vinton Studios; Cowardly Baskets – Reebok, Rhythm & Hues, Inc.; Fiesta – Ritz Bitz Sandwich Crackers, Will Vinton Studios; Mug – Beecham Hot Lemon, Will Vinton Studios; One Match – Match Light Charcoal, Rhythm & Hues, Inc.; Spotlight Switch – Diet 7UP, Duck Soup Productions; Stork – Baer Animation Company, Inc.

== Juried Awards ==
Winsor McCay Award
Recognition for career contributions to the art of animation

- Les Clark
- Stan Freberg
- David Hilberman

Outstanding Individual Achievement in the Field of Animation

- Glen Keane
- John Kricfalusi
- David Silverman

Certificate of Merit
Recognition for service to the art, craft and industry of animation

- Robert Clampett Jr.
- David F. Crane
- George Feltenstein
