= 32nd Annie Awards =

US media awards ceremony held in 2005

- Date: January 30, 2005
- Site: Alex Theatre, Glendale, California, USA
- Hosted by: Tom Kenny
- Organized by: ASIFA-Hollywood

Highlights
- Best Animated Feature: The Incredibles
- Best Direction: Brad Bird; The Incredibles
- Most awards: The Incredibles (10)
- Most nominations: The Incredibles (16)

The 32nd Annual Annie Awards were held on January 30, 2005, at the Alex Theatre in Glendale, California. Nominations were announced on December 6, 2004. The award show is hosted by Tom Kenny. Major awards given include Best Animated Feature for The Incredibles, Best Home Entertainment Production for The Lion King 1½, Best Animated Short Subject for Lorenzo, Best Animated Television Commercial for United Airlines - "Interview", and Best Animated Television Production for SpongeBob SquarePants.

== Winners and nominees ==
Nominations announced on December 6, 2004. Winners are highlighted in boldface.

=== Best Animated Feature ===
- **The Incredibles**
- Ghost in the Shell 2: Innocence
- Shrek 2
- The SpongeBob SquarePants Movie

=== Best Home Entertainment Production ===
- **The Lion King 1½**
- Mickey, Donald, Goofy: The Three Musketeers
- Scooby-Doo! and the Loch Ness Monster

=== Best Animated Short Subject ===
- Agricultural Report
- It's 'The Cat'
- **Lorenzo**
- Rockfish
- Ryan

=== Best Animated Television Commercial ===
- Looney Tunes AFLAC
- Nintendo - "Freeboy"
- Quaker Chewy Bars - "Three Bears"
- Reebok
- **United Airlines - "Interview"**

=== Best Animated Television Production ===
- Foster's Home for Imaginary Friends
- My Life as a Teenage Robot
- **SpongeBob SquarePants**
- Star Wars: Clone Wars
- The Batman
