= José Abel =

East Timorese politician

José dos Reis Francisco Abel is an East Timorese politician who served as Secretary of State for Rural Development and Cooperatives from 2007 to 2010.

He was educated at the University of East Anglia where he was as Chevening Scholar, graduating with an MSc in environment and development in 2004. He also completed an MSc in regional economics at Gadjah Mada University. He was elected to the National Parliament in 2007, but left Parliament later.
