= 33rd Annie Awards =

US media awards ceremony held in 2006

- Date: February 4, 2006
- Site: Alex Theatre, Glendale, California, USA
- Hosted by: Tom Kenny
- Organized by: ASIFA-Hollywood

Highlights
- Best Animated Feature: Wallace & Gromit: The Curse of the Were-Rabbit
- Best Direction: Nick Park and Steve Box; Wallace & Gromit: The Curse of the Were-Rabbit
- Most awards: Wallace & Gromit: The Curse of the Were-Rabbit (10)
- Most nominations: Wallace & Gromit: The Curse of the Were-Rabbit (16)

The 33rd Annual Annie Awards were held on February 4, 2006, at the Alex Theatre in Glendale, California, hosted by Tom Kenny. The ceremony was for the first time recorded for television.

== Winners and Nominees ==
Nominations announced on December 5, 2005. Winners are highlighted in boldface.

=== Best Animated Feature ===
- **Wallace & Gromit: The Curse of the Were-Rabbit**
- Chicken Little
- Corpse Bride
- Howl's Moving Castle
- Madagascar

=== Best Home Entertainment Production ===
- **Lilo & Stitch 2: Stitch Has a Glitch**
- Bionicle 3: Web of Shadows
- Kronk's New Groove
- Tarzan II
- The Batman vs. Dracula

=== Best Animated Short Subject ===
- **The Fan and the Flower**
- Life in Transition
- Milch
- Moongirl
- The Moon and the Son: An Imagined Conversation

=== Best Animated Television Commercial ===
- **United Airlines - "Mr. Pants"**
- ConocoPhillips - "1975"
- They Might Be Giants - "Bastard Wants to Hit Me"
- Coke - "Futbol"
- GE - "Tower"

=== Best Animated Television Production ===
- **Star Wars: Clone Wars**
- Avatar: The Last Airbender
- Foster's Home for Imaginary Friends
- My Life as a Teenage Robot
- The Batman

=== Best Animated Video Game ===
- **Ultimate Spider-Man**
- Psychonauts
- Resident Evil 4
- SpongeBob SquarePants: Lights, Camera, Pants!
- Tak: The Great Juju Challenge
