= 26th Annie Awards =

US media awards ceremony held in 1998

26th
Annie Awards

November 13, 1998

Best Feature Film:
Mulan

Best Primetime Television Program:
The Simpsons

Best Daytime Television Program:
The New Batman/Superman Adventures

Best Home Video Production:
Batman & Mr. Freeze: SubZero

Best Short Subject:
Geri's Game

The 26th Annie Awards were given by the International Animated Film Association, ASIFA-Hollywood to honor outstanding achievements in the field of animation in 1998. Mulan almost swept all film awards, winning 10 awards from its 12 nominations, including Outstanding Animated Theatrical Feature. The Simpsons won its seventh consecutive award on Outstanding Animated Television Program.

== Production categories ==
The Outstanding Animated Television Program was split into two competitive categories: Outstanding Animated Primetime or Late Night Television Program and Outstanding Animated Daytime Television Program. The award Outstanding Animated Television Commercial was awarded for the first time since 21st Annie Awards ceremony.

Winners are listed first, highlighted in bold.

**Outstanding Animated Theatrical Feature**: **Mulan – Walt Disney Feature Animation**; Anastasia – Fox Animation Studios; I Married a Strange Person! – Bill Plympton; Quest for Camelot – Warner Bros. Feature Animation	**Outstanding Animated Primetime or Late Night Television Program**: **The Simpsons – Gracie Films in association with 20th Century Fox Television**; Dexter's Laboratory – Hanna-Barbera Cartoons; King of the Hill – 20th Century Fox Television, Deedle-Dee Productions, Judgemental Films, 3 Arts Entertainment; South Park – Comedy Central; Steven Spielberg Presents A Pinky & The Brain Halloween – Warner Bros. Television Animation
**Outstanding Animated Home Video Production**: **Batman & Mr. Freeze: SubZero – Warner Bros. Animation**; Belle's Magical World – Walt Disney Television Animation; FernGully 2: The Magical Rescue – Wild Brain, Inc.; Pooh's Grand Adventure: The Search for Christopher Robin – Walt Disney Television Animation; Spunky's Camping Adventure – Global Television Syndication in association with CBN International	**Outstanding Animated Daytime Television Program**: **The New Batman/Superman Adventures – Warner Bros. Television Animation**; The Angry Beavers – Nickelodeon Animation Studio; Oh Yeah! Cartoons – Nickelodeon Animation Studio; Steven Spielberg Presents Animaniacs – Warner Bros. Television Animation; Steven Spielberg Presents Pinky and the Brain – Warner Bros. Television Animation
**Outstanding Animated Short Subject**: **Geri's Game – Pixar**; Redux Riding Hood – Walt Disney Television Animation; Three Little Pigs – Walt Disney Television Animation; Titey – J.J. Sedelmaier Productions, Inc.; T.R.A.N.S.I.T – The Illuminated Film Company in association with Picture Start	**Outstanding Animated Television Commercial**: **Flares/Big Pockets – Old Navy, Spümcø, Inc.**; G-Police – Wong Doody, Acme Filmworks; Lizards II – Circle-K Stores, Pacific Data Images; Old Friends – American Express, Warner Bros. Classic Animation; Willy Wonka's Wild Ride Campaign: Shock Tarts – Nestlé Corporation, Wild Brain, Inc.
**Outstanding Animated Interactive Production**: **The Curse of Monkey Island – LucasArts Entertainment Company LLC**; Eggs of Steel – Rhythm and Hues Studios; Flying Saucer – Wild Brain, Inc.	**Outstanding Animated Interstitial, Promotional Production or Title Sequence**: **Late Night Black and White – Cartoon Network, Ink Biscuits**; Genie's Great Minds: Ben Franklin – Walt Disney Television Animation; Canada Open – Cartoon Network, Wild Brain, Inc.; Retromotion Open – Locomotion Channel, Wild Brain, Inc.; The Wonderful Ice Cream Suit – Walt Disney Company, Acme Filmworks

== Outstanding individual achievements in Film ==
Outstanding Achievement in Directing: Barry Cook and Tony Bancroft – Mulan‡; Don Bluth and Gary Goldman – Anastasia; Karl Geurs – Pooh's Grand Adventure: The Search for Christopher Robin; Andy Knight – Beauty and the Beast: The Enchanted Christmas	Outstanding Achievement in Producing: Pam Coats – Mulan‡; Don Bluth and Gary Goldman – Anastasia; Brian Rosen, Richard Harper, Jeffrey Kahan, and Jeff Fino – FernGully 2: The Magical Rescue
Outstanding Achievement in Effects Animation: David Tidgwell – Mulan‡; Jerome Chen – Godzilla; Michel Gagné – Quest for Camelot; Peter Matheson – Anastasia	Outstanding Achievement in Character Animation: Ruben Aquino – Mulan for the character Shang‡; Tom Bancroft – Mulan for the character Mushu; Mark Henn – Mulan for the character Mulan; T. Woody Yocum – Genie's Great Minds
Outstanding Achievement in Voice Acting, Male: Hank Azaria as Bartok – Anastasia‡; Tim Curry as Forte – Beauty and the Beast: The Enchanted Christmas; Jerry Orbach as Lumiere – Beauty and the Beast: The Enchanted Christmas; Christopher Plummer as Barnaby Crooked Man – Babes in Toyland; Paul Winchell as Tigger – Pooh's Grand Adventure: The Search for Christopher Robin	Outstanding Achievement in Voice Acting, Female: Ming-Na Wen as Mulan – Mulan‡; Catherine Cavadini as Mary – Babes in Toyland; Angela Lansbury as Marie – Anastasia; Paige O'Hara as Belle – Belle's Magical World; Meg Ryan as Anastasia – Anastasia
Outstanding Achievement in Music: Matthew Wilder and David Zippel (songs), Jerry Goldsmith (score) – Mulan‡; Michele Brourman and Amanda McBroom (songs), Joseph LoDuca (score) – Hercules and Xena: The Battle for Mount Olympus; Stephen Flaherty and Lynn Ahrens (songs), David Newman (score) – Anastasia; Carl Johnson (score) – Pooh's Grand Adventure: The Search for Christopher Robin; Rachel Portman and Don Black – Beauty and the Beast: The Enchanted Christmas for the song "As Long As There is Christmas"	Outstanding Achievement in Writing: Rita Hsiao, Chris Sanders, Philip LaZebnik, Raymond Singer and Eugenia Bostwick-Singer – Mulan‡; Karl Geurs and Carter Crocker – Pooh's Grand Adventure: The Search for Christopher Robin; Flip Kobler, Cindy Marcus, Bill Motz, and Bob Roth – Beauty and the Beast: The Enchanted Christmas; Eric Tudhman (animation adaption), Susan Gauthire, Bruce Graham, Bob Tzudiker, Noni White (screenplay) – Anastasia; Richard Tulloch – FernGully 2: The Magical Rescue
Outstanding Achievement in Production Design: Hans Bacher – Mulan ‡	Outstanding Achievement in Storyboarding: Chris Sanders – Mulan‡; Li Hong – FernGully 2: The Magical Rescue

== Outstanding individual achievements in Television ==
Outstanding Achievement in Directing: Jim Reardon – The Simpsons for the episode "Trash of the Titans"; Jaime Diaz – Oh Yeah! Cartoons for the episode "ChalkZone"; Raimund Krumme – Big and Little Doors; Pascal Morelli – The Legend of Calamity Jane for the episodes "A Slip of the Whip"; Nelson Recinos – Steven Spielberg Presents Pinky & The Brain, for the episode "Brain Acres"	Outstanding Achievement in Producing: Vincent Davis – Cow and Chicken‡; Gary Katona and Ed Wexler – Genie's Great Minds; John W. Lynn, Jr. – Celebrity Deathmatch; Rob Renzetti – Oh Yeah! Cartoons for the episode "F-Tales"
Outstanding Achievement in Voice Acting, Male: Maurice LaMarche as The Brain – Steven Spielberg Presents Pinky & The Brain; Nandor Nevai as Delivery Man, Sniz & Fondue – KaBlam!; Rob Paulsen as Pinky – Steven Spielberg Presents Pinky & The Brain; David Warner as Doctor Vic Frankenstein – Steven Spielberg Presents Toonsylvania; Robin Williams as Genie – Genie's Great Minds	Outstanding Achievement in Voice Acting, Female: June Foray as Granny – The Sylvester & Tweety Mysteries‡; Christine Cavanaugh as Dexter – Dexter's Laboratory; Kathy Najimy as Peggy Hill – King of the Hill; Bebe Neuwirth as Belladonna – All Dogs Go to Heaven; April Winchell as Cruella DeVille – Disney's 101 Dalmatians: The Series
Outstanding Achievement in Music: Alf Clausen (music) and Ken Keeler (lyrics) – The Simpsons for the episode "The City of New York Vs. Homer Simpson" for the song "You're Checkin' In" (A Musical Tribute to the Betty Ford Center); Bill Burnett and Guy Moon – Cow and Chicken for the episode "The Ugliest Weenie, Part 2"; Lino Sound for the song "Suave-O-Matic" – KaBlam! for the episode"The Off-Beats"; Randy Petersen and Kevin Quinn – Disney's 101 Dalmatians: The Series for the episode "Dalmatian Vacation, Part 2" for the song "Surf Puppies 101"; David Smith, Thomas Chase and Steve Rucker – Dexter's Laboratory for the episode LABretto	Outstanding Achievement in Writing: Charles M. Howell IV, Earl Kress and John Ludin – Steven Spielberg Presents Pinky & The Brain for the episode "The Family That Poits Together Narfs Together"; Cydne Clark and Steve Granat – Disney's 101 Dalmatians: The Series for the episode "Swine Song"; Derek Drymon, Robert Porter and Peter Hannan – CatDog for the episode "DogGone"; Steve Marmel – Johnny Bravo for the episode "The Perfect Gift"; Mark McCorkle and Robert Schooley – Genie's Great Minds
Outstanding Achievement in Production Design: Carlos Ramos – Oh Yeah! Cartoons for the episode "ChalkZone"; Dan Chessher – The Angry Beavers for the episode "The Mighty Knothead"; Dale Hendrickson – Silver Surfer for the episode Antibody; Mike Lowery – The Sylvester & Tweety Mysteries for the episode "Fair's Fair"; Pascal Morelli – The Legend of Calamity Jane for the episodes "An Army of Rogues"	Outstanding Achievement in Storyboarding: Barry Caldwell – Steven Spielberg Presents Pinky & The Brain for the episode "Brain Acres"; Maxwell Atoms (Adam Burton) – Cow and Chicken for the episode "Karate Chick"; Linda Miller – Disney's 101 Dalmatians: The Series for the episode "Bad to the Bone"; Cynthia Petrovic – Disney's 101 Dalmatians: The Series for the episode "Home Is Where the Bark Is"; Carlos Ramos – Oh Yeah! Cartoons for the episode "ChalkZone"

== Juried Awards ==
Winsor McCay Award
Recognition for career contributions to the art of animation

- Eyvind Earle
  Known today for his fine art paintings, Earle worked for the Walt Disney Studios as background artist, color stylist and production designer for such classic films as Lady and the Tramp and Sleeping Beauty and later created art films of his own.
- Hayao Miyazaki
  One of the world's most influential animation filmmakers, Miyazaki is the director of many Japanese features, including My Neighbor Totoro, Kiki's Delivery Service, and Princess Mononoke, the highest-grossing film ever released in Japan.
- Ernie Pintoff
  A veteran animation teacher, director and producer of both theatrical shorts (including the Oscar-winning The Critic) and commercials, Pintoff helped to define a new look for animation in the 1950s through his work at UPA and Terrytoons.

June Foray Award
Recognition of benevolent/charitable impact on the art and industry of animation

- Antran Manoogian

Certificate of Merit
Recognition for service to the art, craft and industry of animation

- Max Howard
- B. Paul Husband
- Media City Center
- Jean Ann Wright

== Multiple wins and nominations ==
The following twenty productions received multiple nominations:

Nominations	Production
12	Mulan
9	Anastasia
7	Steven Spielberg Presents Pinky & The Brain
5	Disney's 101 Dalmatians: The Series
5	Beauty and the Beast: The Enchanted Christmas
5	Oh Yeah! Cartoons
5	Pooh's Grand Adventure: The Search for Christopher Robin
4	FernGully 2: The Magical Rescue
4	Genie's Great Mind
3	Cow and Chicken
3	Dexter's Laboratory
3	The Simpsons
2	The Angry Beavers
2	Babes in Toyland
2	Belle's Magical World
2	KaBlam!
2	King of the Hill
2	The Legend of Calamity Jane
2	Quest for Camelot
2	The Sylvester & Tweety Mysteries

The following three productions received multiple awards:

Awards	Production
10	Mulan
3	Steven Spielberg Presents Pinky & The Brain
3	The Simpsons
