= Stubble Trouble =

2000 film by Joseph E. Merideth

Stubble Trouble is a 2000 animated short film, produced under Calabash Animation and directed by Joseph E. Merideth, a former animator for Calabash and a teacher of animation for The School of the Art Institute of Chicago and Columbia College Chicago.

== Plot ==
The short is about a caveman who tries to impress a woman, who rejects him repeatedly due to his inability to keep a shaven face. The caveman attempts to shave his face using several items, including a sharp knife and a stone wheel. However, after shaving off his beard, the stubble grows back instantly.

== Awards ==
Stubble Trouble was nominated for "Best Animated Short Film" in 2001 in the Academy Awards.
