= 21st Annie Awards =

US media awards ceremony held in 1993

21st
Annie Awards

November 5, 1993

Best Feature Film:
Aladdin

Best Television Program:
The Simpsons

The 21st Annie Awards were given by the International Animated Film Association to honor outstanding achievements in the animation field in 1992.

== Production categories ==
Winners are listed first, highlighted in boldface, and indicated with a double dagger (‡).

**Best Animated Feature**: **Aladdin – Walt Disney Pictures**‡; Little Nemo: Adventures in Slumberland – Tokyo Movie Shinsha, Paramount; Once Upon a Forest – 20th Century Fox	**Best Animated Television Program**: **The Simpsons – 20th Century Fox Television**‡; Disney's The Little Mermaid – Walt Disney Television Animation; Steven Spielberg's Tiny Toon Adventures – Warner Bros. Animation; The Ren & Stimpy Show – Nickelodeon; Batman: The Animated Series – Warner Bros. Animation
**Best Animated Television Commercial**: **Polar Bears – Coca-Cola, Sierra Hotel Productions**‡; Aerospace Jordan – Nike, Renegade Animation; Come to Life – Coors, Acme Filmworks; In the Dark – Butterfinger, Film Roman; One Good Hand – Oregon State Lottery, Acme Filmworks; Runball – Footlocker, Duck Soup Productions; Woman Finding Love – Levi’s, Acme Filmworks

== Juried Awards ==
Winsor McCay Award
Recognition for career contributions to the art of animation

- Roy E. Disney
- Jack Zander
- George Dunning

Outstanding Individual Achievement in the Field of Animation

- Ed Gombert
- Ron Clements
- Dan Castellaneta
- Eric Goldberg

Certificate of Merit
Recognition for service to the art, craft and industry of animation

- Judi Cassell
- Dave Master
