= 28th Annie Awards =

US media awards ceremony held in 2001

28th
Annie Awards

November 11, 2000

Best Animated Feature:
Toy Story 2

Best Primetime Television Program:
The Simpsons

Best Daytime Television Program:
Mickey Mouse Works

Best Home Video Production:
An Extremely Goofy Movie

Best Short Subject:
For the Birds

The 28th Annie Awards were given by the International Animated Film Association, ASIFA-Hollywood to honor outstanding achievements in the field of animation in 2000. This was the final year before the Best Animated Feature award was introduced at the Academy Awards.

== Production categories ==
Winners are listed first, highlighted in boldface, and indicated with a double dagger (‡).

**Outstanding Achievement in an Animated Theatrical Feature**: **Toy Story 2 – Pixar/Walt Disney Pictures** ‡; Chicken Run – Pathé, Aardman and DreamWorks SKG; Fantasia 2000 – Walt Disney Pictures; The Road to El Dorado – DreamWorks SKG; Titan A.E. – 20th Century Fox Animation	**Outstanding Animated Primetime or Late Night Television Program**: **The Simpsons – Gracie Films in association with 20th Century Fox Television**‡; Dexter's Laboratory – Hanna-Barbera Cartoons; Futurama – The Curiosity Co. and 20th Century Fox Television; The PJ's – Imagine Television, Will Vinton Studios; Spy Groove – MTV Animation
**Outstanding Animated Home Video Production**: **An Extremely Goofy Movie – Walt Disney Television Animation**‡; Bartok the Magnificent – 20th Century Fox Television; Mickey's Once Upon a Christmas – Walt Disney Television Animation; Scooby-Doo! and the Witch's Ghost – Hanna-Barbera Cartoons, Warner Bros. Animation; Steven Spielberg Presents Wakko's Wish – Warner Bros. Animation	**Outstanding Animated Daytime Television Program**: **Mickey Mouse Works – Walt Disney Television Animation**‡; The Angry Beavers – Nickelodeon Animation Studio; Recess – Walt Disney Television Animation; Batman Beyond – Warner Bros. Animation; Warner Bros' Histeria! – Warner Bros. Television Animation
**Outstanding Animated Short Subject**: **For the Birds – Pixar**‡; Ghost of Stephen Foster – Matthew Nastuk and Raymond S. Persi; John Henry – Walt Disney Pictures; Little Go Beep – Warner Bros. Classic Animation; Quick Draw El Kabong – Wild Brain, Inc.	**Outstanding Animated Television Commercial**: **Genie – Old Navy, Mirinda Will Vinton Studios**‡; About Face – Crayola, Acme Filmworks, Inc.; Carpool – Village Pantry Renegade Animation, Inc.; Elves – Web TV, Acme Filmworks, Inc.; Playa's Delight – Kevin Garnett, Nike, Wild Brain, Inc.
**Outstanding Animated Special Project**: **The Scooby-Doo Project – Cartoon Network**‡; The Bob Clampett Show – Cartoon Network; Pajama Party – Wild Brain, Inc.; The Jeffersons' "Starship' – Image Spot, Nickelodeon, Nick at Nite	**Outstanding Animated Production Produced for Electronic Media**: **Elmo Aardvark, Outer Space Detective – Renegade Animation, Inc.**‡; Hairballs – Film Roman, Level13.net; Bill Bilkman "Getting Rich While Working From Home" – The Romp Inc.; Space is Dum Episode 11 "Gay Monkey Mummy Part 2" – wildbrain.com, Inc.

== Outstanding individual achievements in Film ==
Outstanding Achievement in Directing: John Lasseter, Lee Unkrich, and Ash Brannon – Toy Story 2‡; Nick Park and Peter Lord – Chicken Run; Ralph Zondag and Eric Leighton – Dinosaur; Jun Falkenstein – The Tigger Movie; Hayao Miyazaki – Princess Mononoke	Outstanding Achievement in Production Design: Susan McKinsey Goldberg – Fantasia 2000‡; Paul Brizzi, Gaetan Brizzi and Carl Jones – Fantasia 2000; Christian Schellewald – The Road to El Dorado; Philip A. Cruden – Titan A.E.; William Cone and Jim Pearson – Toy Story 2
Outstanding Achievement in Effects Animation: Ted C. Kierscey – Fantasia 2000‡; Simon O'Connor – Dinosaur; Doug Ikeler – The Road to El Dorado; Robert Bredon – Stuart Little; Julian Hynes – Titan A.E.	Outstanding Achievement in Character Animation: Eric Goldberg – Fantasia 2000'‡; David Brewster – The Road to El Dorado; Rodolphe Guenoden – The Road to El Dorado; Sean P. Mullen – Stuart Little; Doug Sweetland – Toy Story 2
Outstanding Achievement in Voice Acting, Male: Tim Allen as Buzz Lightyear – Toy Story 2; Armand Assante as Tzekel-Kan – The Road to El Dorado; Bill Farmer as Goofy – An Extremely Goofy Movie; Nikita Hopkins as Roo – The Tigger Movie; Maurice LaMarche as The Brain – Steven Spielberg Presents Wakko's Wish	Outstanding Achievement in Voice Acting, Female: Joan Cusack as Jessie – Toy Story 2‡; Tress MacNeille as Dot – Steven Spielberg Presents Wakko's Wish; Della Reese as Eema – Dinosaur
Outstanding Achievement in Music: Randy Newman (composer, songs and music) – Toy Story 2; James Newton Howard (music) – Dinosaur; Hans Zimmer, John Powell, Elton John & Tim Rice (music) – The Road to El Dorado‡; Richard Stone, Steve Bernstein, Julie Bernstein, Gordon L. Goodwin and Timothy Kelly (composers) – Steven Spielberg Presents Wakko's Wish; Richard M. Sherman and Robert B. Sherman (words and music, for the song "Round My Family Tree") – The Tigger Movie	Outstanding Achievement in Writing: John Lasseter, Pete Docter, Ash Brannon, Andrew Stanton, Rita Hsiao, Doug Chamberlin and Chris Webb – Toy Story 2; Karey Kirkpatrick – Chicken Run; M. Night Shyamalan and Greg Booker – Stuart Little
Outstanding Achievement in Storyboarding: Dan Jeup and Joe Ranft – Toy Story 2; Thom Enriquez – Dinosaur; Jeff Snow – The Road to El Dorado

== Outstanding individual achievements in Television ==
Outstanding Achievement in Directing: Brian Sheesley – Futurama for the episode "Why Must I Be a Crustacean in Love?"‡; Kirk Tingblad – Johnny Bravo for the episode "Noir Johnny"; Susie Dietter – Futurama for the episode "A Bicyclops Built for Two"; Kyounghee Lim and Boohwan Lim – King of the Hill for the episode "Won't You Pimai Neighbor"	Outstanding Achievement in Production Design: John R. Dilworth – Courage the Cowardly Dog for the episode "A Night at the Katz Motel"‡; Bob Doucette – Detention; Nollan Obena – Max Steel for the episode "Sphinxes"; Nelson Lowry – The PJs for the episode "What's Eating Juicy Hudson?"; Glen Hanson – Spy Groove
Outstanding Achievement in Voice Acting, Male: Dan Castellaneta as The Postman – Olive, the Other Reindeer‡; Mike Judge as Hank Hill, Sniz & Fondue – King of the Hill for the episode "Hanky Panky"; Jason Michas as Zak – Dragon Tales; David Warner as Ra's al Ghul – The New Batman/Superman Adventures	Outstanding Achievement in Voice Acting, Female: Christine Cavanaugh as Dexter – Dexter's Laboratory‡; Kathleen Barr as Wheezie – Dragon Tales; Tress MacNeille as The World's Oldest Woman – Warner Bros' Histeria!; Brittany Murphy as Luanne Platter – King of the Hill for the episode "Movin' on Up"; April Winchell as Ms. Finster – Recess for the episode "A Great State Affair"

== Juried Awards ==
Winsor McCay Award
Recognition for career contributions to the art of animation

- Norman McCabe
  With a career spanning more than sixty-five years, Norm McCabe has worked for many animation studios, including Hanna-Barbera, Filmation, DePatie-Freleng, Marvel and Warner Bros. Television Animation, but he is perhaps best known for his tenure as animator and director at the Leon Schlesinger Looney Tunes Studio in the 1930s and 40s.
- Hoyt Curtin
  As a composer and music director for Hanna-Barbera from the 1950s to the 1990s, Hoyt Curtain created the music for some of television's memorable theme songs, including those for The Flintstones, The Jetsons, Top Cat and Jonny Quest.
- Lucille Bliss
  One of the most versatile voice actresses in the business, Lucille Bliss has vocally created hundreds of characters, most notable Crusader Rabbit—television's first animated star—and Smurfette in The Smurfs.

June Foray Award
Recognition of benevolent/charitable impact on the art and industry of animation

- Linda Simensky

Certificate of Merit
Recognition for service to the art, craft and industry of animation

- Jerry Beck
- Mark Zavad
- Bob Miller

Technical Achievement

- Walking with Dinosaurs

Special Achievement in Animation
Recognition of unique and outstanding achievement in animation

- Bob Clampett's Beany and Cecil The Special Edition, Robert Clampett, Jr.
