= 22nd Annie Awards =

US media awards ceremony held in 1994

22nd
Annie Awards

November 12, 1994

Best Feature Film:
The Lion King

Best Television Program:
The Simpsons

The 22nd Annie Awards were given by the International Animated Film Association to honor outstanding achievements in animation in 1993-1994. The Lion King won the most awards with three, including Best Animated Feature. The Nightmare Before Christmas followed with two. The Simpsons won its third consecutive award for Best Animated Television Program.

== Production Categories ==
Winners are listed first, highlighted in boldface, and indicated with a double dagger (‡).

| **Best Animated Feature**: **The Lion King – Walt Disney Pictures**‡; Batman: Mask of the Phantasm – Warner Bros. Animation; The Nightmare Before Christmas – Skellington/Touchstone | **Best Animated Television Program**: **The Simpsons – Fox, Gracie Films, Film Roman**‡; Animaniacs – Warner Bros. Television Animation; Batman: The Animated Series – Warner Bros. Television Animation; The Critic – Gracie Films, Film Roman; The Ren & Stimpy Show – Nickelodeon |
| **Best Animated Home Video Release**: **Animated Legend, Winsor McCay – Lumivision**‡; Urotsukidoji: Legend of the Overfiend – Anime 18; The Lost World – Lumivision; Mickey Mouse: The Black & White Years, Volume 1 – Walt Disney Home Video; The Return of Jafar – Walt Disney Home Video | **Best Animated Television Commercial**: **Sax Man – Duck Soup Productions**‡; Heart Rate – Kurtz & Friends; In the Bag – Will Vinton Studios; Tango – R/Greenberg |
**Best Animated CD-Rom**: **Rebel Assault – LucasArts Entertainment Co.**‡; The Flintstones/Jetsons Timewarp – R/GA Interactive; The Residents Freak Show – The Cryptic Corporation; Sam & Max Hit The Road – LucasArts Entertainment Co.

== Outstanding Individual Achievement ==
| Best Achievement in Creative Supervision: Henry Selick (director) – The Nightmare Before Christmas‡; Mark Gustafson (director) – Mr. Resistor; Bob Camp (creative director) – The Ren & Stimpy Show; Bruce Timm and Eric Radomski (producers) – Batman: The Animated Series; David Silverman (producer) – The Simpsons | Best Achievement in Artisistic Excellence: Deane Taylor (art director) – The Nightmare Before Christmas‡; Mark Henn (supervising animator - Young Simba) – The Lion King; Scott F. Johnston (artistic supervisor - computer graphics) – The Lion King; Andy Gaskill (art director) – The Lion King; Paul Rudish (art director) – Super Secret Squirrel |
| Best Achievement in Story Contribution: Brenda Chapman (head of story) – The Lion King‡; Paul Dini (writer/story editor) – Batman: The Animated Series; David Feiss (story artist) – A Flintstone Family Christmas; Gary Graham (story artist) – Mighty Max; Iwao Takamoto (story artist) – Hollyrock-a-Bye Baby | Best Achievement for Voice Acting: Jeremy Irons as Scar – The Lion King‡; Gregg Berger as Cornfed Pig – Duckman; Mark Hamill as Joker – Batman: The Animated Series; Frank Welker as various characters – Animaniacs; Billy West as Stimpy – The Ren & Stimpy Show |

== Juried Awards ==
Winsor McCay Award
Recognition for career contributions to the art of animation

- Jean Vander Pyl
- Ed Benedict
- Arthur Davis

Certificate of Merit
Recognition for service to the art, craft and industry of animation

- Chris Craig
- Mike Gribble & Craig "Spike" Decker
- Milton Knight
- Rita Street
- Kathy Richardson
- Bryan Mon

== Multiple Wins and Nominations ==
The following six productions received multiple nominations:

| Nominations | Production |
|---|---|
| 6 | The Lion King |
| 4 | Batman: The Animated Series |
| 3 | The Nightmare Before Christmas |
| 3 | The Ren & Stimpy Show |
| 2 | The Simpsons |
| 2 | Animaniacs |

The following two productions received multiple awards:

| Awards | Production |
|---|---|
| 3 | The Lion King |
| 2 | The Nightmare Before Christmas |
