= 25th Annie Awards =

US media awards ceremony held in 1997

25th
Annie Awards

November 16, 1997

Best Feature Film:
Cats Don't Dance

Best Television Program:
The Simpsons

Best Home Video Production:
Aladdin and the King of Thieves

Best Short Subject:
Bjork: I Miss You
(Bjork's Music Video)

The 25th Annie Awards were given by the International Animated Film Association to honor outstanding achievements in animation in 1997. Cats Don't Dance led the nominations with 8 and won two awards, including Best Animated Feature, the first non-Disney film to win it. Disney's Hercules and Fox's The Simpsons won the most awards with four. The Simpsons won its Best Animated Television Program for the sixth time in a row.

== Ceremony information ==
The 25th Annie Awards ceremony took place on Sunday, November 16, 1997, at the Pasadena Civic Auditorium in Pasadena, California. The ceremony started at 2:00 p.m. with a champagne reception, guests had ample time to meet and greet on the patio outside the theater. The show itself, hosted by voice actor Gary Owens, was a well-produced two hours of Owens' witty remarks and character voices, nominee footage, acceptance speeches, and introductions by presenters such as Bill Kroyer, Nick Bosustow, June Foray and Jerry Beck.

== Production categories ==
Winners are listed first, highlighted in boldface, and indicated with a double dagger (‡).

**Best Animated Feature**: **Cats Don't Dance – Turner Feature Animation, David Kirschner Productions**‡; Hercules – Walt Disney Productions; Space Jam – Uli Meyer Features (animation); Character Builders (animation); Charles Gammage Animation (animation); Rees/Leiva Productions (animation); Spaff Animation (animation); Stardust Pictures (animation); Warner Bros.; Courtside Seats Productions; Northern Lights Entertainment	**Best Animated Television Program**: **The Simpsons – Fox, Gracie Films, Film Roman, Klasky Csupo**‡; Dexter's Laboratory; King of the Hill – Fox, Film Roman; Pinky and the Brain – Warner Bros., Warner Bros. Animation, Amblin Entertainment; The Tick – Fox, AKOM Production Company, Fox Children's Network, Graz Entertainment; Sunbow Productions
**Best Animated Video Production**: **Aladdin and the King of Thieves – Walt Disney Feature Animation**‡; The Land Before Time IV: Journey Through the Mists – Universal Cartoon Studios; A Rugrats Vacation – Klasky Csupo, Nickelodeon; This Land Is Your Land: The Animated Kids' Songs of Woody Guthrie – Artisan Entertainment	**Best Animated Short Subject**: **Bjork: I Miss You – Bjork's Music Video** ‡; Saturday Night Live for the episode "The Ambiguously Gay Duo #2”; Saturday Night Live for the episode "The Ambiguously Gay Duo #3”; Action League Now!! - Rock-A-Big Baby; The Big Hunt
**Best Promotional Production**: **Super Mom – Coca-Cola**‡; Main Title – The Angry Beavers; Main Title – Gargoyles; Promotional Trailer – Spawn

== Outstanding individual achievements in Film ==
Best Achievement in Directing: Ron Clements and John Musker – Hercules‡; Mark Dindal – Cats Don't Dance; Bruce W. Smith and Tony Cervone – Space Jam	Best Achievement in Producing: Alice Dewey, Ron Clements and John Musker – Hercules‡; David Kirschner and Paul Gertz – Cats Don't Dance; Ron Tippe – Space Jam
Best Achievement in Effects Animation: Mauro Maressa – Hercules‡; John Allan Armstrong – Cats Don't Dance; Bob Simmons – Cats Don't Dance; Jay Redd – Contact	Best Achievement in Character Animation: Nik Ranieri (for the character Hades) – Hercules‡; Bob Baxter (for the episode "Beethoven's Whiff") – The Lion King's Timon & Pumbaa; Frans Vischer (for the characters Daria Dimple and Max) – Cats Don't Dance; Ken Duncan (for the character Meg) – Hercules
Best Achievement in Music: Randy Newman – Cats Don't Dance‡; Mark Watters and Carl Johnson – Aladdin and the King of Thieves; Steve Goldstein – Cats Don't Dance; Leslie Bricusse – The Land Before Time IV: Journey Through the Mists; Woody Guthrie and Frank Fuchs – This Land Is Your Land: The Animated Kids' Songs of Woody Guthrie	Best Technical Achievement: Space Jam – Uli Meyer Features (animation); Character Builders (animation); Charles Gammage Animation (animation); Rees/Leiva Productions (animation); Spaff Animation (animation); Stardust Pictures (animation)‡

== Outstanding individual achievements in Television ==
Best Achievement in Directing: Mikel B. Anderson – The Simpsons for the episode "Homer's Phobia"‡; Charles Visser – Animaniacs for the episode "Noel"; John Rice – King of the Hill for the episode "Keeping Up with Our Jones"; Robert Gannaway and Tony Craig – The Lion King's Timon & Pumbaa for the episodes "Beethoven's Whiff", "Bumble in the Jungle" and "Mind Over Matterhorn"; David Wasson – Cartoon Sushi, for the episode "Voice B Gone"	Best Achievement in Producing: Al Jean and Mike Reiss – The Simpsons for the episode "The Springfield Files"‡; Genndy Tartakovsky – Dexter's Laboratory for the episode "Ham Hocks in Arm Locks"; Mitch Watson – Duckman for the episode "Ebony Baby"; Kathi Castillo – Earthworm Jim for the episode "Hyper-Psycrow"; J. J. Sedelmaier – Saturday Night Live for the episode "The Ambiguously Gay Duo #2"
Best Achievement in Voice Acting, Male: Rob Paulsen as Pinky – Pinky and the Brain‡; Jeff Bennett as Johnny Bravo – Johnny Bravo; Mike Judge as Hank Hill – King of the Hill; Phil Hayes as Tumbleweed Tex – School Daze; Townsend Coleman as The Tick – The Tick	Best Achievement in Voice Acting, Female: June Foray as Granny – The Sylvester & Tweety Mysteries‡; Christine Cavanaugh as Dexter – Dexter's Laboratory; Tress MacNeille as Debbie Douglas – Freakazoid! for the episode "Mission Freakazoid"; Brittany Murphy as Luanne – King of the Hill; Maggie Roswell as Sharry Bobbins – The Simpsons for the episode "Supercalifragilisticexpial(annoyed grunt)cious"
Best Achievement in Production Design: Mitch Schauer – The Angry Beavers for the episode "Born to Be Beavers"‡; Mike Moon – The Lion King's Timon & Pumbaa for the episode "Bumble in the Jungle"; Kexx Singleton – The Lion King's Timon & Pumbaa for the episode "Beethoven's Whiff"; Sy Thomas Tex – The Lion King's Timon & Pumbaa for the episode "Bumble in the Jungle"; Barbara Schade – The Magic Pearl	Best Achievement in Music: Alf Clausen – The Simpsons‡; Michael Tavera, Charles Fernandez, Ron Grant and Harvey Cohen – Casper‡; Thomas Chase and Steve Rucker – Dexter's Laboratory; Carl Johnson – Disney's Mighty Ducks; Shirley Walker (main title theme) – Superman; Michael Silversher and Michael Silversher – Boo to You Too! Winnie the Pooh
Best Achievement in Writing: Jason Butler Rote and Paul Rudish – Dexter's Laboratory for the episode "The Beard to be Feared"‡; Mark Young – Adventures from the Book of Virtues for the episode "Loyalty"; Alan R. Cohen and Alan Freedland – King of the Hill for the episode "Shins of the Father"; Paul Lieberstein – King of the Hill for the episode "Luanne's Saga"; Jane Wagner – Edith Ann's Christmas: Just Say Noel	Best Achievement in Storyboarding: Nora Johnson – Cow and Chicken for the episode "Orthodontic Police"‡; Denise Koyama – Jungle Cubs for the episode "A Night in the Wasteland"; Eric Radomski – Spawn for the episode "Burning Visions"; Carolyn Gair-Taylor – The Sylvester & Tweety Mysteries for the episode "Spaced-Out"; Bob Logan – The Lion King's Timon & Pumbaa for the episode "Bumble in the Jungle"

== Juried Awards ==
Winsor McCay Award
Recognition for career contributions to the art of animation

- Willis H. O'Brien Posthumous recognition
- Myron Waldman
- Paul Winchell

June Foray Award
Recognition of benevolent/charitable impact on the art and industry of animation

- Phyllis Craig Posthumous recognition

Certificate of Merit
Recognition for service to the art, craft and industry of animation

- Women in Animation
- The World Animation Celebration

== Multiple wins and nominations ==
The following sixteen productions received multiple nominations:

Nominations	Production
8	Cats Don't Dance
6	Hercules
6	King of the Hill
6	The Lion King's Timon & Pumbaa
5	Dexter's Laboratory
5	The Simpsons
4	Space Jam
3	Saturday Night Live
2	The Angry Beavers
2	Aladdin and the King of Thieves
2	The Land Before Time IV: Journey Through the Mists
2	Pinky and the Brain
2	Spawn
2	The Sylvester & Tweety Mysteries
2	This Land Is Your Land: The Animated Kids' Songs of Woody Guthrie
2	The Tick

The following three productions received multiple awards:

Awards	Production
4	Hercules
4	The Simpsons
2	Cats Don't Dance
