= 36th Annie Awards =

US media awards ceremony held in 2009

- Date: January 30, 2009
- Site: Royce Hall; Los Angeles, California, U.S.
- Hosted by: Tom Kenny
- Organized by: ASIFA-Hollywood

Highlights
- Best Animated Feature: Kung Fu Panda
- Best Direction: John Stevenson and Mark Osborne; Kung Fu Panda
- Most awards: Kung Fu Panda (10)
- Most nominations: Kung Fu Panda (16)

The 36th Annual Annie Awards, honoring the best in animation for 2008, were held on January 30, 2009, at Royce Hall in Los Angeles, California. Below is a list of announced nominees. Kung Fu Panda received the most awards with 10, winning nearly all of its nominations, albeit amid controversy.

== Production nominees ==
Nominations announced on December 1, 2008.

=== Best Animated Feature ===
- Kung Fu Panda
  - Bolt
  - $9.99
  - WALL-E
  - Waltz with Bashir

=== Annie Award for Best Home Entertainment Production ===
- Futurama: The Beast with a Billion Backs
  - Batman: Gotham Knight
  - Christmas Is Here Again
  - Justice League: The New Frontier
  - The Little Mermaid: Ariel's Beginning

=== Annie Award for Best Animated Short Subject ===
- Wallace & Gromit: A Matter of Loaf and Death
  - Glago's Guest
  - Hot Dog
  - Presto
  - Sebastian's Voodoo

=== Annie Award for Best Animated Television Commercial ===
- United Airlines "Heart"
  - Giant Monster
  - Long Legs Mr. Hyde
  - Rotofugi: The Collectors
  - Sarah

=== Annie Award for Best Animated Television Production ===
- Robot Chicken: Star Wars Episode II
  - King of the Hill
  - Moral Orel
  - Phineas and Ferb
  - The Simpsons

=== Best Animated Television Production for Children ===
- Avatar: The Last Airbender – Nickelodeon
  - A Miser Brothers' Christmas – Warner Bros.
  - Foster's Home for Imaginary Friends – Cartoon Network
  - Underfist: Halloween Bash – Cartoon Network
  - The Mighty B! – Nickelodeon

=== Annie Award for Best Animated Video Game ===
- Kung Fu Panda
  - Dead Space
  - WALL-E

== Individual Achievement ==
=== Animated Effects ===
- Li-Ming Lawrence Lee – Kung Fu Panda
  - Alen Lai – Dr. Seuss’ Horton Hears A Who
  - Fangwei Lee – Madagascar: Escape 2 Africa
  - Kevin Lee – Bolt
  - Enrique Vila – WALL-E

=== Character Animation in a Feature Production ===
- James Baxter – Kung Fu Panda
  - Jeff Gabor – Dr. Seuss’ Horton Hears A Who
  - Philippe Le Brun – Kung Fu Panda
  - Victor Navone – WALL-E
  - Dan Wagner – Kung Fu Panda

=== Character Animation in a Television Production ===
- Pierre Perifel – Secrets of the Furious Five
  - Sandro Cleuzo – Secrets of the Furious Five
  - Joshua A. Jennings – Robot Chicken: Star Wars Episode II

=== Character Design in an Animated Feature Production ===
- Nico Marlet – Kung Fu Panda
  - Valerie Hadida – Igor
  - Sang Jun Lee – Dr. Seuss’ Horton Hears A Who

=== Character Design in an Animated Television Production ===
- Nico Marlet – Secrets of the Furious Five
  - Bryan Arnett – Mighty B!: "Bat Mitzah Crashers"
  - Ben Balistreri – Foster's Home for Imaginary Friends: "Mondo Coco"
  - Sean Galloway – The Spectacular Spider-Man
  - Jorge Gutierrez – El Tigre: The Adventures of Manny Rivera: "The Good, The Bad, The Tigre"

=== Directing in an Animated Feature Production ===
- John Stevenson and Mark Osborne – Kung Fu Panda
  - Sam Fell and Rob Stevenhagen – The Tale Of Despereaux
  - Ari Folman – Waltz with Bashir
  - Tatia Rosenthal – $9.99
  - Andrew Stanton – WALL-E

=== Directing in an Animated Television Production ===
- Joaquim Dos Santos – Avatar: The Last Airbender: "Sozin’s Comet: Into the Inferno"
  - Bob Anderson – The Simpsons: "Treehouse of Horror XIX"
  - Craig McCracken and Rob Renzetti – Foster's Home for Imaginary Friends: "Destination Imagination"
  - Chris McKay – Moral Orel: "Passing"
  - Alan Smart – SpongeBob SquarePants: "Penny Foolish"

=== Music in an Animated Feature Production ===
- Hans Zimmer & John Powell – Kung Fu Panda – DreamWorks Animation
  - Kevin Manthei – Batman: Gotham Knight – Warner Bros. Animation
  - John Powell – Dr. Seuss’ Horton Hears A Who – Blue Sky Studios
  - Max Richter – Waltz With Bashir – Sony Pictures Classics, Bridgit Folman, Les Films D'ici, Razor Films
  - William Ross – The Tale of Despereaux (film) – Universal Pictures

=== Music in an Animated Television Production or Short Form ===
- Henry Jackman, Hans Zimmer & John Powell – Secrets of the Furious Five – DreamWorks Animation
  - Carl Finch & Brave Combo – Click and Clack's As the Wrench Turns – CTTV Productions
  - Kevin Kiner – Star Wars The Clone Wars: Rising Malevolence – Lucasfilm Animation Ltd.
  - Guy Moon – Back at the Barnyard Cowman: The Uddered Avenger – Nickelodeon/Omation
  - Guy Michelmore – Growing Up Creepie: Rockabye Freakie – Taffy Entertainment LLC

=== Production Design in an Animated Feature Production ===
- Tang Heng Kung Fu Panda – DreamWorks Animation
  - Ralph Eggleston WALL-E – Pixar Animation Studios
  - Paul Felix Bolt – Walt Disney Animation Studios
  - Evgeni Tomov The Tale Of Despereaux – Universal Pictures
  - Raymond Zibach Kung Fu Panda – DreamWorks Animation

=== Production Design in an Animated Television Production or Short Form ===
- Tang Heng Secrets of the Furious Five – DreamWorks Animation
  - Andy Harkness Glago's Guest – Walt Disney Animation Studios
  - Seonna Hong – The Mighty B! "Bee Patients" – Nickelodeon
  - Dan Krall – Chowder "The Heavy Sleeper" – Cartoon Network Studios
  - Raymond Zibach Secrets of the Furious Five – DreamWorks Animation

=== Storyboarding in an Animated Feature Production ===
- Jennifer Yuh Nelson – Kung Fu Panda – DreamWorks Animation
  - Alessandro Carloni – Kung Fu Panda – DreamWorks Animation
  - Ronnie Del Carmen – WALL-E – Pixar Animation Studios
  - Joe Mateo Bolt – Walt Disney Animation Studios
  - Rob Stevenhagen – The Tale Of Despereaux – Universal Pictures

=== Storyboarding in an Animated Television Production or Short Form ===
- Chris Williams Glago's Guest – Walt Disney Animation Studios
  - Butch Hartman – Fairly OddParents "Mission: Responsible" – Nickelodeon
  - Andy Kelly – Ni Hao, Kai-Lan "Twirly Whirly Flyers" – Nickelodeon Productions/Nelvana
  - Andy Schuhler – Secret of the Furious Five – DreamWorks Animation
  - Eddie Trigueros The Mighty B! "Name Shame"– Nickelodeon

=== Voice Acting in an Animated Feature Production ===
- Dustin Hoffman – Voice of Shifu – Kung Fu Panda – DreamWorks Animation
  - Ben Burtt – Voice of WALL-E – WALL-E – Pixar Animation Studios
  - James Hong – Voice of Mr. Ping – Kung Fu Panda – DreamWorks Animation
  - Ian McShane – Voice of Tai Lung – Kung Fu Panda – DreamWorks Animation
  - Mark Walton – Voice of Rhino – Bolt – Walt Disney Animation Studios

=== Voice Acting in an Animated Television Production or Short Form ===
- Ahmed Best – Voice of Jar Jar Binks – Robot Chicken: Star Wars Episode II – ShadowMachine
  - Seth MacFarlane – Voice of Peter Griffin – Family Guy "I Dream of Jesus" – Fox TV Animation/Fuzzy Door Productions
  - Dwight Schultz – Voice of Mung Daal – Chowder "Apprentice Games" – Cartoon Network Studios

=== Writing in an Animated Feature Production ===
- Jonathan Aibel & Glenn Berger – Kung Fu Panda – DreamWorks Animation
  - Etan Cohen and Eric Darnell & Tom McGrath – Madagascar: Escape 2 Africa – DreamWorks Animation
  - Ari Folman – Waltz With Bashir – Sony Pictures Classics, Bridgit Folman, Les Films D'ici, Razor Films
  - Cinco Paul and Ken Daurio – Dr. Seuss’ Horton Hears A Who – Blue Sky Studios

=== Writing in an Animated Television Production or Short Form ===
- Tom Root, Douglas Goldstein, Hugh Davidson, Mike Fasolo, Seth Green, Dan Milano, Matthew Senreich, Kevin Shinick, Zeb Wells, Breckin Meyer – Robot Chicken: Star Wars Episode II – ShadowMachine
  - Joel H. Cohen – The Simpsons "The Debarted" – Gracie Films/Fox TV
  - Scott Kreamer – El Tigre: The Adventures of Manny Rivera "Mustache Love" – Nickelodeon
  - Paul McEvoy and Todd Berger – Secrets of the Furious Five – DreamWorks Animation
  - Chris Williams – Glago's Guest – Walt Disney Animation Studios

== Juried award winners ==
- Winsor McCay Award — Mike Judge, John Lasseter and Nick Park
- June Foray Award — Bill Turner
- Certificate of Merit — Amir Avni, Mike Fontanelli, Kathy Turner and Alex Vassilev
