= The ULULU Company =

American production company

- Formerly: The Curiosity Company (1997–2018; 2023–2026)
- Type: Private
- Industry: Television production Animation production
- Founded: April 21, 1997; 29 years ago
- Founder: Matt Groening
- Headquarters: Los Angeles, California, U.S.
- Products: Futurama; Disenchantment
- Owner: Matt Groening

Logo as "The Curiosity Company", used from 1999 to 2026

The ULULU Company, also known as The Curiosity Company for secondary branding, is an American production company founded in 1997 by Matt Groening, creator of The Simpsons, for Gracie Films. The company productions include the television series Futurama and Disenchantment and the 1999 television film Olive, the Other Reindeer. Groening revived the name The Curiosity Company between 2023 and 2026, when he started to use the name The ULULU Company once again.

== Filmography ==
=== Television series ===
Title	Genre	Premiere	Seasons	Platform	Runtime	Status	Notes
Futurama	Animated sitcom Science fiction Satire	March 28, 1999	11 seasons, 180 episodes	Fox (Seasons 1-4); Comedy Central (Seasons 5-7; Hulu (Seasons 8-11)	22 min	Ended	Credited as "The Curiosity Company"; co-production with 20th Century Fox Television (seasons 1–7) and 20th Television Animation (seasons 8–11)
Disenchantment	Animated sitcom Fantasy; Adventure; Satire	August 17, 2018	5 parts, 50 episodes	Netflix	19–36 min	Ended	

=== Television films ===
Title	Genre	Premiere	Runtime	Notes
Olive, the Other Reindeer	Christmas comedy musical	December 17, 1999	45 min	Co-production with Flower Films and DNA Productions
Futurama: Bender's Big Score	Science fiction comedy adventure film	November 27, 2007	89 min	Co-production with 20th Century Fox Television
Futurama: The Beast with a Billion Backs	Science fiction comedy adventure film	June 24, 2008	89 min	Co-production with 20th Century Fox Television
Futurama: Bender's Game	Science fantasy comedy film	November 4, 2008	87 min	Co-production with 20th Century Fox Television
Futurama: Into the Wild Green Yonder	Science fiction comedy adventure film	February 23, 2009	89 min	Co-production with 20th Century Fox Television
