= 29th Annie Awards =

US media awards ceremony held in 2002

The 29th annual Annie Awards honoring animation excellence in 2001. Shrek became the big winner of 2001, taking eight of its twelve nominations, including the Best Animated Feature.

== Best Animated Feature ==
Winner:

- Shrek-DreamWorks

Nominees:

- Osmosis Jones-Warner Bros.
- Blood: The Last Vampire-Production I.G
- The Emperor's New Groove-Walt Disney Pictures

== Best Animated Short Subject ==
Winner:

- Hubert's Brain-WildBrain Inc.

Nominees:

- Mr. Digital Tokoro #1542-Nippon TV
- Rejected-Don Hertzfeldt
- Stubble Trouble-Calabash Animation
- Tenacious D: Fuck Her Gently-Spümcø

== Best Animated Home Video Production ==
Winner:

- Batman Beyond: Return of the Joker-Warner Bros. Animation

Nominees:

- Joseph: King of Dreams-DreamWorks SKG
- Lady & the Tramp II: Scamp's Adventure-Walt Disney Television Animation

== Other awards ==
The Emperor's New Groove nabbed three awards: one for Voice Acting in a Feature Production (female category) with Eartha Kitt as Yzma, Character Animation for Dale Baer on said character and best song.

Other winners included Eddie Murphy for the role of Donkey in Shrek, The Simpsons, Futurama, Invader Zim, Kathy Najimy for her role as Peggy Hill in King of the Hill, Batman Beyond: Return of the Joker and The Powerpuff Girls.

== June Foray Award ==
- Leonard Maltin

== Winsor McCay Award ==
- Bob Givens
- Pete Alvadaro
- Bill Justice
