= 31st Annie Awards =

US media awards ceremony held in 2004

31st
Annie Awards

February 7, 2004

Best Feature Film:
Finding Nemo

Best Television Program:
The Simpsons

Best Home Video Production:
The Animatrix

Best Short Subject:
Boundin'

The 31st Annual Annie Awards honoring excellence in the field of animation of 2003 were held on February 7, 2004, at the Alex Theatre in Glendale, California.

== Production nominees ==
| Best Animated Feature | Outstanding Achievement in an Animated Home Entertainment Production |
|---|---|
| Finding Nemo – Pixar: Brother Bear – Walt Disney Animation Studios; Looney Tunes: Back in Action – Warner Bros.; Millennium Actress – Go Fish Pictures; The Triplets of Belleville – Les Armateurs | The Animatrix – Silver Pictures / Warner Home Video: 101 Dalmatians II: Patch's London Adventure – Disneytoon Studios; Rolie Polie Olie: The Baby Bot Chase – Nelvana Limited / Sparkling; Stitch! The Movie – Walt Disney Television Animation |
| Outstanding Achievement in an Animated Short Subject | Outstanding Achievement in an Animated Television Commercial |
| Boundin' – Pixar: Ananda – Vinton Studios; Boys Night Out – Barley Films; Destino – Walt Disney Pictures; Nibbles – Acme Filmworks | Lamisil: "It's Alive – Wild Brain Inc.: Bombay "Drift" – Psyop Inc.; Colorado Lottery "Woodcut" – Acme Filmworks; Wisconsin Lottery "Casino" – Acme Filmworks |
| Outstanding Achievement in an Animated Television Production | Outstanding Achievement in an Animated Television Production Produced For Children |
| The Simpsons – Gracie Films: Captain Sturdy – Renegade Animation; The Fairly OddParents – Nickelodeon Animation Studio; Samurai Jack – Cartoon Network Studios; Spider-Man: The New Animated Series – Adelaide Productions | The Adventures of Jimmy Neutron: Boy Genius – Nickelodeon Productions / DNA Productions: ChalkZone – Nickelodeon Animation Studio; Duck Dodgers – Warner Bros. Animation; Jakers! The Adventures of Piggley Winks – Mike Young Productions; JoJo's Circus – Cartoon Pizza / Cuppa Coffee Studios |

== Individual achievement categories ==
| Character Animation | Character Design in an Animated Feature Production |
|---|---|
| Doug Sweetland – Finding Nemo – Pixar: Anthony DeRosa – Looney Tunes: Back in Action – Warner Bros.; Byron Howard – Brother Bear – Walt Disney Animation Studios; Gini Santos – Finding Nemo – Pixar | Ricky Nierva – Finding Nemo – Pixar: Rune Brandt Bennicke – Brother Bear – Walt Disney Animation Studios; Carter Goodrich – Sinbad: Legend of the Seven Seas – DreamWorks Animation |
| Character Design in an Animated Television Production | Directing in an Animated Feature Production |
| Andy Suriano – Samurai Jack – Cartoon Network Studios: Andrew Bialk – The Powerpuff Girls – Cartoon Network Studios; Matt Danner – Xiaolin Showdown – Warner Bros. Animation; Shannon Tindle – The Proud Family – Jambalaya Studios / Y. R. Studio | Andrew Stanton & Lee Unkrich – Finding Nemo – Pixar: Sylvain Chomet – The Triplets of Belleville – Les Armateurs; Eric Goldberg – Looney Tunes: Back in Action – Warner Bros. Animation; Satoshi Kon – Millennium Actress – Go Fish Pictures |
| Directing in an Animated Television Production | Effects Animation |
| Steven Dean Moore – The Simpsons – Gracie Films: Mike Gasaway – The Adventures of Jimmy Neutron: Boy Genius – Nickelodeon Productions / DNA Productions; Rob Renzetti – My Life as a Teenage Robot – Nickelodeon Animation Studios / Frederator Studios; Genndy Tartakovsky & Robert Alvarez – Samurai Jack – Cartoon Network Studios; Darrell Van Citters – Captain Sturdy – Renegade Animation | Martin Nguyen – Finding Nemo – Pixar: Justin Ritter - Finding Nemo – Pixar; Dave Stephens – The Haunted Mansion – Walt Disney Pictures; Jason Wolbert – Brother Bear – Walt Disney Animation Studios; Madoka Yasuet – Piglet's Big Movie – Disneytoon Studios |
| Music in an Animated Feature Production | Music in an Animated Television Production |
| Thomas Newman – Finding Nemo – Pixar: Phil Collins & Mark Mancina – Brother Bear – Walt Disney Animation Studios; Harry Gregson-Williams – Sinbad: Legend of the Seven Seas – DreamWorks Animation | Alf Clausen, Ian Maxtone-Graham & Ken Keeler – The Simpsons – Gracie Films: Robert Kral, Wayne Coyne & Steven Drozd – Duck Dodgers – Warner Bros. Animation; Ken Keeler – Futurama – The Curiosity Company; Lolita Ritmanis, Kristopher Carter, Michael McCuistion & Andy Sturmer – Teen Titans – DC Entertainment / Warner Bros. Animation |
| Production Design in an Animated Television Production | Storyboarding in an Animated Feature Production |
| Scott Wills – Samurai Jack – Cartoon Network Studios: Seonna Hong – My Life as a Teenage Robot – Nickelodeon Animation Studios / Frederator Studios; Joseph Holt – My Life as a Teenage Robot – Nickelodeon Animation Studios / Frederator Studios; Mark Whiting – Duck Dodgers – Warner Bros. Animation | Sharon Forward – The Jungle Book 2 – Disneytoon Studios: Holly Forsyth – The Jungle Book 2 – Disneytoon Studios; Chris Otsuki – The Jungle Book 2 – Disneytoon Studios; Dave Prince – The Jungle Book 2 – Disneytoon Studios; Dean Roberts – 101 Dalmatians II: Patch's London Adventure – Disneytoon Studios |
| Storyboarding in an Animated Television Production | Voice Acting in an Animated Feature Production |
| Dave Thomas – The Fairly OddParents – Nickelodeon Animation Studios: Tim Divar – He-Man and the Masters of the Universe – Cartoon Network Studios; Enrique Braxton May – ChalkZone – Nickelodeon Animation Studios; Kyle Menke – Spider-Man: The New Animated Series – Adelaide Productions; Matt Youngberg – Teen Titans – DC Entertainment / Warner Bros. Animation | Ellen DeGeneres – Finding Nemo – Pixar: Joe Alaskey – Looney Tunes: Back in Action – Warner Bros. Animation; Jim Cummings – The Jungle Book 2 – Disneytoon Studios; Miyoko Shoji – Millennium Actress – Go Fish Pictures; Jeremy Suarez – Brother Bear – Walt Disney Animation Studios |
| Voice Acting in an Animated Television Production | Writing in an Animated Feature Production |
| Jeffrey Garcia – The Adventures of Jimmy Neutron: Boy Genius – DNA Productions / Nickelodeon Animation Studio: Bob Bergen – Duck Dodgers – Warner Bros. Animation; Janice Kawaye – My Life as a Teenage Robot – Frederator Studios / Nickelodeon Animation Studios; Candi Milo – My Life as a Teenage Robot – Frederator Studios / Nickelodeon Animation Studios; Tara Strong – Jakers! The Adventures of Piggley Winks – Mike Young Productions | Andrew Stanton, Bob Peterson & David Reynolds – Finding Nemo – Pixar: Sylvain Chomet – The Triplets of Belleville – Les Armateurs; Satoshi Kon & Sadayuki Murai – Millennium Actress – Go Fish Pictures; Jim Kammerud & Brian Smith – 101 Dalmatians II: Patch's London Adventure – Disneytoon Studios; Tab Murphy, Lorne Cameron, David Hoselton, Steve Bencich & Ron J. Friedman – Brother Bear – Walt Disney Animation Studios |
Writing in an Animated Television Production
Matt Warburton - The Simpsons - Gracie Films: Paul Dini - Justice League – Warner Bros. Animation; Tony Gama-Lobo & Rebecca May - King of the Hill - 20th Century Fox Television; Patric Verrone - Futurama - The Curiosity Company; William Waldner - Captain Sturdy - Renegade Animation

== Juried awards ==
Winsor McCay Award
Gene Deitch, John Hench & Thurl Ravenscroft
for their career contributions to the art of animation
June Foray Award
Martha Sigall
for her significant and benevolent or charitable impact on the art and industry of animation
Ub Iwerks Award
Scott Johnston
for technical advancement that has made a significant impact on the art or industry of animation
Certificate of Merit
David Derks, Mike Judge/Don Hertzfeldt
