= ASIFA-Hollywood =

American non-profit film organization

- Formation: 1957; 69 years ago Los Angeles, California, U.S.
- Founders: Bill Scott; Stephen Bosustow; Ward Kimball; Bill Littlejohn; William T. Hurtz; Les Goldman
- Type: Non-profit organization
- President: Frank Gladstone
- Website: asifa-hollywood.org

ASIFA-Hollywood, an American non-profit organization in Los Angeles, California, is a branch member of the International Animated Film Association. Its purpose is to promote the art of film animation in a variety of ways, including its own archive and an annual awards presentation, the Annie Awards. It is also known as the International Animated Film Society.

Many branches of ASIFA exist throughout the world; in the U.S. there are chapters in San Francisco, New York City, Atlanta, Seattle, the Detroit area, and others, while internationally, organizations exist in Annecy, France, Italy, and Japan. ASIFA also sponsors several animation film festivals throughout the world, including the ASIFA-Hollywood Student Animation Festival. It includes a virtual archive, museum, library and research facility, containing the ASIFA-Hollywood Animation Archive Project.

== History and projects of ASIFA-Hollywood ==
ASIFA-Hollywood was founded in 1957, by Bill Scott, Stephen Bosustow, Ward Kimball, William T. Hurtz, Les Goldman, and Bill Littlejohn. June Foray was another early member, and recalled that she joined "a year or so" after the organization was chartered.

As of 2026, its board of directors includes Frank Gladstone (President), Jerry Beck (Vice-President), J.J. Blumenkranz (Vice-President), Tom Caulfield (Vice-President), William C. Turner (Treasurer), Erica Pinto (Secretary), Brooke Keesling (International Representative), Ashley Barber, Vani, David Derks, Todd Kurosawa, Bob Kurtz, Dori Littell-Herrick, David Silverman and Charles Solomon.

=== The Annie Awards ===
Since 1972, ASIFA-Hollywood has hosted an annual awards ceremony to honor individuals who have made significant contributions to the art of animation. Originally designed to honor the lifetime achievements of veterans of the field, the Annie Awards now recognizes the year's best animated productions and individual achievements in the field of animation. Qualified members participate in the nomination process and final voting.

=== Film preservation ===
Prior to 1950, motion pictures were shot and printed on unstable, flammable nitrate film stock that decomposed over time, placing many early animated films in danger of being lost. Through the Animation Preservation Project, ASIFA-Hollywood seeks out to save endangered cartoons, and raises funds to preserve them on safety film stock and digital film.
