= Annie Award for Outstanding Achievement for Character Design in an Animated Television/Broadcast Production =

Annual US television award

Annie Award for Character Design in an Animated Television/Broadcast Production
- Awarded for: Excellence in character animation
- Country: United States
- Presented by: ASIFA-Hollywood
- First award: 2002
- Currently held by: Robert Valley – Love, Death & Robots (2025)
- Website: annieawards.org

The Annie Award for Character Design in an Animated Television/Broadcast Production is an Annie Award given annually to the best character animation in television or broadcast productions. It was first presented at the 30th Annie Awards.

== Winners and nominees ==
=== 2000s ===
Year	Recipient(s)	Notes	Program	Episode(s)	Network
2002 (30th)
2002 (30th)	Lynne Naylor-Reccardi		Samurai Jack	"Jack and the Warrior Woman"	Cartoon Network
2002 (30th)	Dave Kupczyk		Ozzy & Drix		Kids' WB
2002 (30th)	Alex Kirwan		Time Squad	"The Clownfather"	Cartoon Network
2002 (30th)	Paul Rudish		The Powerpuff Girls	"Members Only"	Cartoon Network
2002 (30th)	Shannon Tindle		The Proud Family	"Forbidden Date"	Disney Channel
2003 (31st)
2003 (31st)	Andy Suriano		Samurai Jack	"Jack and the Haunted House"	Cartoon Network
2003 (31st)	Matt Danner		Xiaolin Showdown		Kids' WB
2003 (31st)	Shannon Tindle		The Proud Family	"Culture Shock"	Disney Channel
2003 (31st)	Andrew Bialk		The Powerpuff Girls	"Save Mojo"	Cartoon Network
2004 (32nd)
2004 (32nd)	Patrick Pathè		Father of the Pride		NBC
2004 (32nd)	Ben Balistreri		The Fairly OddParents	"Crash Nebula"	Nickelodeon
2004 (32nd)	Shakeh Haghnazarian		Hi Hi Puffy AmiYumi		Cartoon Network
2004 (32nd)	Lynne Naylor-Reccardi		Foster's Home for Imaginary Friends	"House of Bloo's"	Cartoon Network
2004 (32nd)	Chris Reccardi		The Powerpuff Girls	"West in Pieces"	Cartoon Network
2005 (33rd)
2005 (33rd)	Ernie Gilbert		The Fairly OddParents	"The Good Old Days"	Nickelodeon
2005 (33rd)	Jorge Gutierrez		The Buzz on Maggie	"Bella con Carny"	Disney Channel
2005 (33rd)	Shannon Tindle		Foster's Home for Imaginary Friends	"Go Goo Go"	Cartoon Network
2005 (33rd)	Bryan Arnett		My Life as a Teenage Robot	"Escape from Cluster Prime"	Nickelodeon
2005 (33rd)	Luther McLaurin		Catscratch		Nickelodeon
2006 (34th)
2006 (34th)	Mike Kunkel		The Life and Times of Juniper Lee	"Party Monsters"	Cartoon Network
2006 (34th)	Ben Balistreri		Danny Phantom	"King Tuck"	Nickelodeon
2006 (34th)	Carlos Ramos		The X's	"Homebody"	Nickelodeon
2006 (34th)	Eric Robles		The X's	"You Only Sneeze Twice"	Nickelodeon
2007 (35th)
2007 (35th)	Jorge R. Gutierrez		El Tigre: The Adventures of Manny Rivera	"Fistful of Collars"	Nickelodeon
2008 (36th)
2008 (36th)	Nico Marlet		Secrets of the Furious Five		NBC
2008 (36th)	Bryan Arnett		The Mighty B!	"Bat Mitzah Crashers"	Nickelodeon
2008 (36th)	Ben Balistreri		Foster's Home for Imaginary Friends	"Mondo Coco"	Cartoon Network
2008 (36th)	Sean Galloway		The Spectacular Spider-Man		The CW
2008 (36th)	Jorge Gutierrez		El Tigre: The Adventures of Manny Rivera	"The Good, The Bad, The Tigre"	Nickelodeon
2009 (37th)
2009 (37th)	Bill Schwab		Prep & Landing		ABC
2009 (37th)	Bryan Arnett		The Mighty B!	"Catatonic"	Nickelodeon
2009 (37th)	Ben Balistreri		Foster's Home for Imaginary Friends		Cartoon Network
2009 (37th)	Craig Kellman		Merry Madagascar		NBC

=== 2010s ===
Year	Recipient(s)	Notes	Program	Episode(s)	Network
2010 (38th)
2010 (38th)	Ernie Gilbert		T.U.F.F. Puppy		Nickelodeon
2010 (38th)	Andy Bialk		The Ricky Gervais Show		HBO
2010 (38th)	Gordon Hammond		T.U.F.F. Puppy		Nickelodeon
2010 (38th)	Steve Lambe		Fanboy & Chum Chum		Nickelodeon
2010 (38th)	Stephen Destefano		Sym-Bionic Titan		Cartoon Network
2011 (39th)
2011 (39th)	Bill Schwab		Prep & Landing: Naughty vs. Nice		ABC
2011 (39th)	Carl Raggio		Kick Buttowski: Suburban Daredevil		Disney XD
2011 (39th)	Chad Hurd		Archer		FX
2011 (39th)	Chris Battle		Dan Vs.		The Hub
2011 (39th)	Gordon Hammond		T.U.F.F. Puppy		Nickelodeon
2011 (39th)	Mike Dougherty		T.U.F.F. Puppy		Nickelodeon
2011 (39th)	Robert Ryan Cory		Secret Mountain Fort Awesome		Cartoon Network
2012 (40th)
2012 (40th)	Robert Walley		TRON: Uprising	"The Renegade, Part I"	Disney XD
2012 (40th)	Andy Bialk		Dragons: Riders of Berk	"Alvin and the Outcasts"	Cartoon Network
2012 (40th)	Thaddeus Paul Cauldron		Secret Mountain Fort Awesome	"Secret Mountain Uncle Grandpa"	Cartoon Network
2012 (40th)	Andy Suriano		DC Nation Shorts	"Plastic Man: The Many and the Fowl"	Cartoon Network
2012 (40th)	Derrick Wyatt, Chap Yaep, Steven Choi, Shakeh Haghnazarian		Ben 10: Omniverse	"The More Things Change, Pt. 2"	Cartoon Network
2012 (40th)	"C" Raggio IV		Kick Buttowski: Suburban Daredevil	"Petrified"	Disney XD
2012 (40th)	Bryan Konietzko, Joaquim Dos Santos, Ki-Hyun Ryu, Kim Il Kwang, Kim Jin Sum		The Legend of Korra	"Welcome to Republic City"	Nickelodeon
2012 (40th)	Gordon Hammond		T.U.F.F. Puppy	"Dudley Do-Wrong"	Nickelodeon
2013 (41st)
2013 (41st)	Paul Rudish		Mickey Mouse		Disney Channel
2013 (41st)	Ben Adams		Regular Show		Cartoon Network
2013 (41st)	Danny Hynes, Colin Howard		Steven Universe		Cartoon Network
2013 (41st)	Craig McCracken		Wander Over Yonder		Disney Channel
2013 (41st)	Andy Bialk		The Awesomes		Hulu
2014 (42nd)
2014 (42nd)	Benjamin Balistreri		Wander Over Yonder		Disney XD
2014 (42nd)	Zac Gorman		Welcome to the Wayne		Nickelodeon
2014 (42nd)	Andy Suriano		Mickey Mouse		Disney Channel
2015 (43rd)
2015 (43rd)	Craig Kellman	Character Designer: Buddy, Jovie, Walter Hobbs, Michael Hobbs, Mr. Greenway, Chadwick & Matthews, Santa Claus, Background Characters	Elf: Buddy's Musical Christmas		NBC
2015 (43rd)	Junpei Takayama	Character Designer (Note: DuckBuhdeuce Pizza Winner A, DuckSwaySway, Pizza Winner A, Mushroom Worker A, Onion Worker A, Pepperoni Worker A, Pizza Lord A, Pizza Lord, Mechanical Arms A, Pizza Lord Muscle A, Pizza Lord Fat A, Pizza Lord Small A, Spider A)	Breadwinners	"Wrath of the Pizza Lord"	Nickelodeon
2015 (43rd)	David Tilton	Character Designer (Note: Harvey in Club Suit, Harvey in Leotard Club, Dance Circle Bouncer, Club Incidentals, Bunny Protest DJ Dade on Sugar Techno Bear in Club Outfit, Jeremy as Bartender, Irving in Apron, Miriam in Apron)	Harvey Beaks	"Night Club Night"	Nickelodeon
2015 (43rd)	Gordon Hammond, Steve Hirt, Jennifer Wood, Mike Dougherty	Character Designers (Note: Incidental Scientist Crowd, Treehouse Bot, Incidental Cab Driver, Pig in Picklemart Uniform, Psychopath Giraffe, Pigeon Workers, Movie Director Clam, Blaster Player 2, President of Planet as Muscle Man, Exquisite Frog, Incidental Clown, Incidental Production Assistant, Mr. Manelli, Goat in Swimwear, Monster Weasel, Banana Bot, Dr. Eggplant Face)	Pig Goat Banana Cricket	"Pig Goat Banana Cricket High Five!"	Nickelodeon
2015 (43rd)	Dave Cooper, Mike Dougherty, Jennifer Wood, Steve Hirt	Design Supervisor, Character Designers (Note: Co-Creator: Dave Cooper (Characters: Pig, Goat, Banana, Cricket, Captain, Sassafras, Mr. Manelli, Dog Cart, Picklemart Mascot, Shragger, Rasta Rat, Love Comet, Burgerstein, Junior Ranger, Sneezy, Butt Monster Angel, Dog Cart, Babies); Design Supervisor: Mike Dougherty (Characters: Incidental Store Clerk 0001, Incidental Animal 0049, Sludge Monster); Character Designer: Jennifer Wood (Characters: Clerk McGirk I, Adult 0011, Kid 0012, Kid 0008, Adult 0037, Adult 0010, Animal 0052, Prince Mermeow, Animal 0031, Animal 0025, Animal 0016, Animal 0050, Animal 0008, Animal 0002, Animal 0001, Animal 0007, Animal 0004, Animal 0003, Animal 0059, Animal 0048, Animal 0006); Character Designer: Steve Hirt (Character: Junior Ranger Elephant))	Pig Goat Banana Cricket	"Miss Cutesy Meow Meows"	Nickelodeon
2015 (43rd)	Tapan Gandhi	Character Designer: Multiple Characters	Pickle and Peanut	"Swim Lessons"	Disney XD
2015 (43rd)	Chris Mitchell, Keiko Murayama	Character Designer, Character Supervisor: Various Characters	The Mr. Peabody & Sherman Show	"New Sponsor/Cleopatra"	Netflix
2016 (44th)
2016 (44th)	Victor Maldonado, Alfredo Torres, Jules Rigolle	Character Designers: All Characters	Trollhunters: Tales of Arcadia	"Win, Lose or Draal"	Netflix
2016 (44th)	Raphaël Chabassol	Art Director: Max, Gark, Betty	Counterfeit Cat	"28 Seconds Later"	Teletoon/Disney XD
2016 (44th)	Jennifer Wood	Character Designer: Various Characters	Pig Goat Banana Cricket	"It's Time to Slumber Party"	Nickelodeon
2016 (44th)	Benjamin Balistreri	Character Designer: Various Characters	Wander Over Yonder	"The Night Out"	Disney XD
2016 (44th)	Robin Davey	Character Design: Multiple Characters	Rain or Shine		Google Spotlight Stories
2017 (45th)
2017 (45th)	Craig Kellman	Character Designer: Various Characters	Samurai Jack	"Episode XCVI"	Adult Swim
2017 (45th)	Shane Prigmore, Bobby Pontillas, Taylor Krahenbuhl, Mayumi Nose	Character Designers: Rapunzel, Eugene, Maximus, Cassandra, King Frederick, Queen Arianna, Landy Caine, Fidella, Pub Thugs, Pascal	Tangled: The Series	"Tangled Before Ever After"	Disney Channel
2017 (45th)	Mike Owens	Character Designer: Phillip	Danger & Eggs	"Tube of Pain"	Prime Video
2017 (45th)	Ryan Wiesbrock, Becky van Cleve, Rob Ronning, Nikki Rice Malki, Felicia Bleu Rose	Character Designers: Buddy Thunderstruck, Darnell, Moneybags, Big Tex, Jacko, All Other Characters	Buddy Thunderstruck	"Buddy Double"	Netflix
2017 (45th)	Jules Rigolle, Alfredo Torres, Linda Chen, Rustam Hasanov, Alfonso Blaas	Character Designers, Lead Texture Artist, Art Director, Color Key Artist (Note: Character Designer: Jules Rigolle; Alfredo Torres (Characters: Goblins, Dictatious, Enrique, Gum Gums, Gunmar, Queen Usurna, Nyarlagroth); Lead Texture Artist: Linda Chen (Characters: Goblins, Dictatious, Enrique, Gum Gums, Gunmar, Queen Usurna, Nyarlagroth); Art Director: Rustam Hasanov (Characters: Gunmar, Goblins and Gumm Gumms); Color Key Artist: Alfonso Blaas (Characters: Enrique, Goblins, Queen Usurna, Nyarlagroth, Gumm Gumms))	Trollhunters: Tales of Arcadia	"Escape from the Darklands"	Netflix
2018 (46th)
2018 (46th)	Amanda Jolly	Character Designer: Rapunzel Bird, Cassandra Bird, Father Parrot, Special Birds	Rapunzel's Tangled Adventure	"Freebird"	Disney Channel
2018 (46th)	Jim Bryson	Character Designer: Niko, Lyra, Nar Est, Breadtroll, Cutie Pootie, Combo Plate Vendor, Windcrag	Niko and the Sword of Light	"The Forest of Fangs"	Prime Video
2018 (46th)	Chris Mitchell	Art Director: Rocky, Natasha, Bullwinkle, Fearless Leader, Boris, Director Peachfuzz	The Adventures of Rocky and Bullwinkle	"The Stink of Fear: Chapter One"	Prime Video
2018 (46th)	Keiko Murayama	Character Designer: Baby Natasha, Gang, Baby Boris, Grandwinkle, Mayor Grundstrom, Boris' Gang	The Adventures of Rocky and Bullwinkle	"The Stink of Fear: Chapter One"	Prime Video
2018 (46th)	Bruno Mangyoku	Character Designer: Various Characters	Age of Sail		Google Spotlight Stories
2019 (47th)
2019 (47th)	Keiko Murayama	Character Designer: Carmen Sandiego, Paper Star, Player, Shadowsan, Chief, Julia Argent, Chase Devineaux	Carmen Sandiego	"The Chasing Paper Caper"	Netflix
2019 (47th)	Lauren Faust	Executive Producer	DC Super Hero Girls	"#SweetJustice Pt. 1-4"	Cartoon Network
2019 (47th)	Fabien Mense	Character Designer: Big Camazotz Bat, Don Jalapeno, Baby, Camazotz Bat, Regular Camazotz Bat, Victor, Bat Swarms, Coex Heiroglyphs	Victor and Valentino	"Know It All"	Cartoon Network
2019 (47th)	John Jagusak	Lead Character Designer	T.O.T.S.	"You've Gotta Be Kitten Me"/"Whale, Hello There!"	Disney Junior
2019 (47th)	Chris Mitchell	Art Director: Rocky, Natasha, Bullwinkle, Fearless Leader, Boris, Director Peachfuzz	The Adventures of Rocky and Bullwinkle	"Amazamoose and Squirrel Wonder: Chapter Five"	Prime Video

=== 2020s ===
Year	Recipient(s)	Notes	Program	Episode(s)	Network
2020 (48th)
2020 (48th)	Joe Sparrow		Amphibia	"The Shut-In!"	Disney Channel
2020 (48th)	Yusuke Yoshigaki		BNA: Brand New Animal	"Runaway Raccoon"	Netflix
2020 (48th)	Danny Hynes		Craig of the Creek		Cartoon Network
2020 (48th)	Jim Soper		Looney Tunes Cartoons		HBO Max
2020 (48th)	Marina Gardner		The Owl House	"Young Blood, Old Souls"	Disney Channel
2021 (49th)
2021 (49th)	Evan Monteiro		Arcane	"Some Mysteries Better Left Unsolved"	Netflix
2021 (49th)	Otto Schmidt		Batman: The Long Halloween	"Part One"	Warner Bros. Animation
2021 (49th)	Craig McCracken		Kid Cosmic	"The Rings of Power"	Netflix
2021 (49th)	Jorge R. Gutierrez		Maya and the Three	"The Sun and the Moon"	Netflix
2021 (49th)	Keiko Murayama		Yuki 7	"They Called Her Number Seven"	Chromosphere
2022 (50th)
2022 (50th)	Alberto Mielgo		Love Death + Robots	"Jibaro"	Netflix
2022 (50th)	Joe Sparrow		Amphibia	"The Hardest Thing"	Disney Channel
2022 (50th)	Meybis Ruiz Cruz		Entergalactic		Netflix
2022 (50th)	Rebecca Chan		Oni: Thunder God's Tale	"The Demon Moon Rises"	Netflix
2022 (50th)	Marie Delmas		Spirit Rangers	"Belly of the Beast"	Netflix
2023 (51st)
2023 (51st)	Jose Lopez		Marvel's Moon Girl and Devil Dinosaur	"The Beyonder"	Disney Channel
2023 (51st)	Tara Billinger		Clone High	"Let's Try This Again"	Max
2023 (51st)	Nick Winn		Jessica's Big Little World	"Bedtime Routine"	Cartoon Network
2023 (51st)	Lesego Vorester		Kizazi Moto: Generation Fire	"You Give Me Heart"	Disney+
2023 (51st)	Marie Delmas		Spirit Rangers	"Water Protectors"	Netflix
2024 (52nd)
2024 (52nd)	Jose Lopez		Marvel's Moon Girl and Devil Dinosaur	"The Molecular Level"	Disney Channel
2024 (52nd)	Grant Alexander		Dream Productions	"A Night to Remember"	Disney+
2024 (52nd)	Kal Athannassov		Jentry Chau vs. the Underworld	"Pilot"	Netflix
2024 (52nd)	Rustam Hasanov		Tales of the Teenage Mutant Ninja Turtles	"Bishop Makes Her Move!"	Paramount+
2024 (52nd)	Amelia Vidal		X-Men '97	"Mutant Liberation Begins"	Disney+
2025 (53rd)
2025 (53rd)	Robert Valley		Love, Death & Robots	"400 Boys"	Netflix
2025 (53rd)	Borja Montoro		Asterix and Obelix: The Big Fight	"Episode IV"	Netflix
2025 (53rd)	Benjamin Tong		Bat-Fam	"A Knight at the Movies"	Amazon Prime Video
2025 (53rd)	Seth St. Pierre		Wednesdays with Gramps		DreamWorks Animation
2025 (53rd)	Lou Hamou-Lhadj		Win or Lose	"Home"	Disney+
