= Cara Speller =

British producer of film and television

Speller in 2026

Cara Louise Speller (born 2 October 1972) is a British producer of film and television. She is best known for producing animated film Pear Cider and Cigarettes and for Pearl as an executive producer. Both films received Best Animated Short Film nomination; Speller was nominated for Pear Cider and Cigarettes as well as director Robert Valley.

== Early life ==
She was born in Sutton, in south London. She attended an independent school. she took Maths GCSE early. She took her GCSEs in 1989. She passed Biology, Chemistry and English A level in 1991.

== Filmography ==
- 2022 - The Boy, the Mole, the Fox and the Horse (animated film)
- 2019-2020 - 101 Dalmatian Street (TV Series) (executive producer)
- 2017 - Gorillaz - Saturnz Barz (video) (producer)
- 2016 - Pear Cider and Cigarettes (Documentary short) (producer)
- 2016 - Pearl (Short) (executive producer: passion pictures)
- 2013 - Rollin' Christmas (Short) (producer)
- 2011 - Reindeer (Documentary short) (executive producer)
- 2010 - MTV World Stage: Gorillaz (TV Movie) (executive producer)
- 2010 - Gorillaz Featuring Mos Def and Bobby Womack: Stylo (Video short) (producer)
- 2008 - Phoo Action (TV Movie) (consulting producer)
- 2008 - Bananaz (Documentary) (executive producer: Gorillaz)
- 2006 - Gorillaz: Phase Two - Slowboat to Hades (Video) (executive producer: Gorillaz)
- 2006 - Gorillaz: Live in Manchester (TV Special) (executive producer: Gorillaz)
- 2006 - The 48th Annual Grammy Awards (TV Special) (executive producer: Gorillaz)
- 2005 - MTV Europe Music Awards 2005 (TV Special) (executive producer: Gorillaz)

== Awards and nominations ==
Award	Date of ceremony	Category	Work	Recipient(s)	Result	Ref(s)
Academy Awards	February 26, 2017	Best Animated Short Film	Robert Valley and Cara Speller	Pear Cider and Cigarettes	Nominated	
Grammy Awards	February 8, 2006	Grammy Award for Best Short Form Music Video	"Feel Good Inc."	Shared with: Gorillaz; Peter Candeland (director); Jamie Hewlett	Nominated	
Grammy Awards	February 11, 2007	Grammy Award for Best Long Form Music Video	Demon Days: Live in Manchester	Shared with: Gorillaz; David Barnard	Nominated	
Grammy Awards	February 13, 2011	Grammy Award for Best Short Form Music Video	"Stylo"	Shared with: Gorillaz; Yasiin Bey (as Mos Def); Bobby Womack; Peter Candeland (director); Jamie Hewlett	Nominated	
