= Annie Award for Outstanding Achievement for Production Design in an Animated Television/Broadcast Production =

Annual US television award

Annie Award for Production Design in an Animated Television/Broadcast Production
- Awarded for: Excellence in production design
- Country: United States
- Presented by: ASIFA-Hollywood
- First award: 1997
- Currently held by: Gigi Cavenago – Love, Death & Robots (2025)
- Website: annieawards.org

The Annie Award for Production Design in an Animated Television/Broadcast Production is an Annie Award given annually to the best production design in animated television or broadcasting productions. Prior to the creation of the category in 1997, television productions competed alongside feature films in the Best Individual Achievement for Artistic Excellence in the Field of Animation award, presented in 1994, later renamed Best Individual Achievement for Production Design in the Field of Animation to for 1995 and 1996.

== Winners and nominees ==
=== 1990s ===
Best Individual Achievement for Artistic Excellence in the Field of Animation

Year	Recipient(s)	Film
1994 (22nd)
1994 (22nd)	Deane Taylor (art director)	The Nightmare Before Christmas
1994 (22nd)	Andy Gaskill (art director)	The Lion King
1994 (22nd)	Mark Henn (supervising animator)	The Lion King
1994 (22nd)	Scott F. Johnston (artistic supervisor)	The Lion King
1994 (22nd)	Paul Rudish (art director)	Super Secret Squirrel

Best Individual Achievement for Production Design in the Field of Animation

Year	Recipient(s)	Film
1995 (23rd)
1995 (23rd)	Michael Giaimo (art director)	Pocahontas
1995 (23rd)	Fred Warter (production designer)	A Goofy Movie
1995 (23rd)	Kazuyoshi Takeuchi (production designer)	Gargoyles
1995 (23rd)	Rasoul Azadani (layout artistic supervisor)	Pocahontas
1995 (23rd)	Adrian Penn (art director)	Weiss Energy Hall: The Origin of Energy
1996 (24th)
1996 (24th)	Ralph Eggleston	Toy Story
1996 (24th)	Hans Bacher	Balto
1996 (24th)	Hiroshi Ôno	Gargoyles
1996 (24th)	Takashi Watabe, Hiromasa Ogura	Ghost in the Shell
1996 (24th)	David Goetz	The Hunchback of Notre Dame

Best Individual Achievement: Production Design in a Television Production

Year	Program	Episode(s)	Recipient(s)	Network
1997 (25th)
1997 (25th)	The Angry Beavers	"Born to Be Beavers"	Mitch Schauer	Nickelodeon
1997 (25th)	The Magic Pearl		Barbara Schade	ABC
1997 (25th)	Timon & Pumbaa	"Bumble in the Jungle"	Mike Moon	Syndication
1997 (25th)	Timon & Pumbaa	"Bumble in the Jungle"	Sy Thomas	Syndication
1997 (25th)	Timon & Pumbaa	"Beethoven's Whiff"	Kexx Singleton	Syndication
1998 (26th)
1998 (26th)	Oh Yeah! Cartoons: ChalkZone		Carlos Ramos	Nickelodeon
1998 (26th)	The Legend of Calamity Jane	"An Army of Rogues"	Pascall Morelli	The WB
1998 (26th)	Silver Surfer	"Antibody"	Dale Hendrickson	Fox Kids
1998 (26th)	The Sylvester & Tweety Mysteries	"Fair's Fair"	Mike Lowery	Kids' WB
1998 (26th)	The Angry Beavers	"The Kighty Knothead"	Dan Chessher	Nickelodeon
1999 (27th)
1999 (27th)	The New Batman/Superman Adventures	"Legends of the Dark Knight"	Glen Murakami	Kids' WB
1999 (27th)	The PJs	"Boyz 'N' The Woods"	Paul Harrod	Fox
1999 (27th)	The Powerpuff Girls	"Uh Oh Dynamo"	Craig Kellman	Cartoon Network
1999 (27th)	4WD (Four Women Driving)	"Friday"	Sue Rose	Walt Disney Television Animation
1999 (27th)	JetCat	"Sacred Identity"	Jay Stephens	Nickelodeon

=== 2000s ===
Year	Program	Episode(s)	Recipient(s)	Network
2000 (28th)
2000 (28th)	Courage the Cowardly Dog	"A Night at the Katz Motel"	John R. Dilworth	Cartoon Network
2000 (28th)	Detention		Bob Doucette	Kids' WB
2000 (28th)	Max Steel	"Sphinxes"	Nollan Obena	Kids' WB
2000 (28th)	Spy Groove		Glen Hanson	MTV
2000 (28th)	The PJs	"What's Eating Juicy Hudson?"	Nelson Lowry	Fox
2001 (29th)
2001 (29th)	The Powerpuff Girls		Don Shank	Cartoon Network
2001 (29th)	Teacher's Pet		Gary Baseman	ABC
2001 (29th)	Time Squad		Tim Biskup	Cartoon Network
2001 (29th)	X-Men: Evolution		Steven E. Gordon	Kids' WB
2001 (29th)	Invader Zim		Jhonen Vasquez	Nickelodeon
2002 (30th)
2002 (30th)	Samurai Jack	"The Beginning"	Dan Krall	Cartoon Network
2002 (30th)	Kim Possible		Alan Bodner	Disney Channel
2002 (30th)	Samurai Jack	"The Beginning"	Scott Wills	Cartoon Network
2002 (30th)	Time Squad	"Keepin' It Real With Sitting Bull"	Dave Wasson	Cartoon Network
2002 (30th)	The Zeta Project		Rosalina Tchouchev	Kids' WB
2003 (31st)
2003 (31st)	Samurai Jack	"The Birth of Evil"	Scott Wills	Cartoon Network
2003 (31st)	My Life as a Teenage Robot		Seonna Hong	Nickelodeon
2003 (31st)	My Life as a Teenage Robot		Joseph Holt	Nickelodeon
2003 (31st)	Duck Dodgers		Mark Whiting	Cartoon Network
2004 (32nd)
2004 (32nd)	Samurai Jack	"Season of Death"	Richard Daskas	Cartoon Network
2004 (32nd)	My Life as a Teenage Robot		Alex Kirwan	Nickelodeon
2004 (32nd)	Hi Hi Puffy AmiYumi	"Dis-Harmony"	Michael Giamo	Cartoon Network
2004 (32nd)	Duck Dodgers		Mark Whiting	Cartoon Network
2004 (32nd)	Jakers! The Adventures of Piggley Winks		John Over	PBS Kids
2005 (33rd)
2005 (33rd)	Foster's Home for Imaginary Friends	"A Lost Claus"	Mike Moon, Craig McCracken, Dave Dunnet, Martin Ansolabehere	Cartoon Network
2005 (33rd)	My Life as a Teenage Robot		Alex Kirwan	Nickelodeon
2005 (33rd)	The Life and Times of Juniper Lee	"Enter Sandman"	Alan Bodner	Cartoon Network
2005 (33rd)	Hi Hi Puffy AmiYumi		Michael Giamo	Cartoon Network
2005 (33rd)	Kim Possible	"So The Drama"	Nadia Vurbenova	Disney Channel
2006 (34th)
2006 (34th)	Foster's Home for Imaginary Friends	"Good Wilt Hunting"	Martin Ansolabehere	Cartoon Network
2006 (34th)	Wow! Wow! Wubbzy!	"Tale of Tails"	Bob Boyle	Nickelodeon/Starz Kids & Family
2006 (34th)	The Life and Times of Juniper Lee	"Water We Fighting For"	Alan Bodner	Cartoon Network
2006 (34th)	My Gym Partner's a Monkey	"Grub Drive"	Dan Hrall	Cartoon Network
2006 (34th)	CAMP LAZLO!	"Hard Days Samson"	Sue Mondt	Cartoon Network
2007 (35th)
2007 (35th)	Not awarded			
2008 (36th)
2008 (36th)	Secrets of the Furious Five		Tang Heng	NBC
2008 (36th)	Glago's Guest		Andy Harkness	Walt Disney Animation Studios
2008 (36th)	Secrets of the Furious Five		Raymond Zibach	NBC
2008 (36th)	The Mighty B!	"Bee Patients"	Seonna Hong	Nickelodeon
2008 (36th)	Chowder	"The Heavy Sleeper"	Dan Krall	Cartoon Network
2009 (37th)
2009 (37th)	Prep & Landing		Andy Harkness	ABC
2009 (37th)	Foster's Home for Imaginary Friends		Janice Kubo	Cartoon Network
2009 (37th)	Prep & Landing		Mac George	ABC

=== 2010s ===
Year	Program	Episode(s)	Recipient(s)	Network
2010 (38th)
2010 (38th)	Kung Fu Panda Holiday		Richie Sacilioc	NBC
2010 (38th)	Neighbors from Hell		Alan Bodner	TBS
2010 (38th)	Firebreather		Barry Jackson	Cartoon Network
2010 (38th)	Sym-Bionic Titan		Scott Wills	Cartoon Network
2010 (38th)	Doubtsourcing		Pete Oswald	Badmash Animation Studios
2011 (39th)
2011 (39th)	Secret Mountain Fort Awesome		Mark Bodnar, Chris Tsirgiotis, Sue Modt, Daniel Elson	Cartoon Network
2011 (39th)	Hoops & Yoyo Ruin Christmas		Peter Martin	CBS
2012 (40th)
2012 (40th)	TRON: Uprising	"The Stranger"	Alberto Mielgo	Disney XD
2012 (40th)	The Simpsons	"Moe Goes from Rags to Riches"	Lynna Blankenship, Sean Coons, Hugh MacDonald, Debbie Peterson, Charles Ragins, Lance Wilder, Darrel Bowen, Kevin Moore, Brent M. Bowen, Brice Mallier, Steven Fahey, Dima Malanitchev, Karen Bauer, Eli Balser, Anne Ledge	Fox
2012 (40th)	Gravity Falls	"Tourist Trapped"	Ian Worrel	Disney Channel
2012 (40th)	Adventure Time	"The Hard Easy"	Nick Jennings, Martin Ansolabehere, Sandra Calleros, Ron Russell, Santino Lascano, Derek Hunter, Catherine E. Simmonds	Cartoon Network
2012 (40th)	Hoops & Yoyo's Haunted Halloween		Peter Martin, Chris Grine, Ira Baker, Ramon Olivera, Scott Brown	Hallmark Channel
2012 (40th)	Justin Time	"The Rubbery Dumplings"	Brandon James Scott, Keith Lee	Family Jr.
2013 (41st)
2013 (41st)	The Legend of Korra		Angela Sung, William Niu, Christine Bian, Emily Tetri, Frederic Stewart	Nickelodeon
2013 (41st)	Adventure Time		Nick Jennings, Sandra Calleros, Teri Shikasho, Ron Russell, Martin Ansolebehere	Cartoon Network
2013 (41st)	Steven Universe		Steven Sugar, Emily Walus, Sam Bosma, Elle Michalka, Amanda Winterstein	Cartoon Network
2013 (41st)	The Simpsons	"Treehouse of Horror XXIV"	Lynna Blankenship, Dima Malanitchev, Debbie Peterson, Charles Ragins, Jefferson R. Weekley	Fox
2013 (41st)	The Venture Bros.		Liz Artinian, Ray Friedman, Chris Fisher, George Fort	Adult Swim
2013 (41st)	Transformers: Prime	"Beast Hunters"	Vacher Christophe	The Hub
2014 (42nd)
2014 (42nd)	Mickey Shorts		Narina Sokolova	Walt Disney Animation Studios
2014 (42nd)	Cosmos: A Spacetime Odyssey		Kara Vallow, Brent Woods, Lucas Gray, Andrew Brandou	National Geographic/Fox
2014 (42nd)	Mickey Mouse		Joseph Holt	Disney Channel
2014 (42nd)	The Powerpuff Girls: Dance Pantsed		Kevin Dart, Chris Turnham, Jasmin Lai, Elle Michalka	Cartoon Network
2014 (42nd)	Turbo Fast		Antonio Canobbio, Khang Le, Mark Taihei, Howard Chen, Brandon Cuellar	Netflix
2014 (42nd)	Wander Over Yonder		Alex Kirwan, Chris Tsirgiotis, Alexander Duckworth, Janice Kubo, Francis Giglio	Disney XD
2014 (42nd)	Zack & Quack		Gavish Erez	Nick Jr. Channel
2015 (43rd)
2015 (43rd)	The Mr. Peabody & Sherman Show	"Peabody's Parents/Galileo"	Kevin Dart, Sylvia Liu, Chris Turnham, Eastwood Wong	Netflix
2015 (43rd)	Fresh Beat Band of Spies	"Singing Pirate"	Ernie Gilbert, Kristin Donner, Steve Meyers, Fred Gardner, David Cole	Nickelodeon
2015 (43rd)	Pig Goat Banana Cricket	"Happy Chalawunga!"	Dave Cooper, Mike Dougherty, Francis Giglio	Nickelodeon
2015 (43rd)	Pig Goat Banana Cricket	"Prank Thy Neighbor"	Dave Cooper, Mike Dougherty, Francis Giglio	Nickelodeon
2015 (43rd)	Dawn of the Croods	"Garden of Eaten"	Jonathan Pyun, Aaron Spurgeon, Baptiste Lucas, Margaret Wuller, Ethan Becker	Netflix
2015 (43rd)	Gravity Falls	"Xpcveaoqfoxso (Weirdmageddon)"	Ian Worrel, Jeffrey Thompson	Disney XD
2015 (43rd)	Puffin Rock	"Night Lights"	Lily Bernard, Marie Thorhauge, Stefano Scapolan	RTÉjr/Netflix
2016 (44th)
2016 (44th)	Pearl		Tuna Bora	Google Spotlight Stories
2016 (44th)	Adventure Time	"Bad Jubies"	Jason Kolowski	Cartoon Network
2016 (44th)	Puffin Rock	"The First Snow"	Lily Bernard	RTÉjr/Netflix
2016 (44th)	Rain or Shine		Robin Davey	Google Spotlight Stories
2016 (44th)	The Mr. Peabody & Sherman Show	"The Wrath of Hughes"	Kevin Dart, Sylvia Liu, Chris Turnham, Eastwood Wong	Netflix
2017 (45th)
2017 (45th)	Samurai Jack	"Episode XCIII"	Scott Wills	Adult Swim
2017 (45th)	Big Hero 6: The Series	"Baymax Returns"	Mark Taihei, Ben Plouffe, Chris Whittier, Sylvia Filcak, Amy Chen	Disney XD/Disney Channel
2017 (45th)	June		Jasmin Lai, Théo Guignard, Arthur Chaumay, Tiffany Ford, Sylvia Liu	Broad Reach Pictures
2017 (45th)	Mickey Mouse	"The Scariest Story Ever: A Mickey Mouse Halloween Spooktacular!"	Jenny Gase-Baker, Justin Martin	Disney Channel
2017 (45th)	The Loud House	"Tricked!"	Amanda Rynda, Larry Murphy, Edgar Duncan, Hallie Wilson, Jared Morgan	Nickelodeon
2018 (46th)
2018 (46th)	Age of Sail		Céline Desrumaux, Jasmin Lai	Google Spotlight Stories
2018 (46th)	Mickey Mouse	"Amore Motore"	Jenny Gase-Baker, Justin Martin	Disney Channel
2018 (46th)	Little Big Awesome	"Let's Get to That Thing!"	Antonio Canobbio, Howard Chen, Ivan Louey, Crystal Yoori Son	Prime Video
2018 (46th)	Niko and the Sword of Light	"The Thorn of Contention"	Antonio Canobbio, Bobby Walker, Michelle Rhee, Richard Chang, Joseph Martinez	Prime Video
2018 (46th)	The Adventures of Rocky and Bullwinkle	"The Stink of Fear: Chapter One"	Chris Mitchell, Chris Turnham, Tor Aunet, DanBob Thompson, Aaron Spurgeon	Prime Video
2019 (47th)
2019 (47th)	Love, Death & Robots	"The Witness"	Alberto Mielgo	Netflix
2019 (47th)	Mao Mao: Heroes of Pure Heart	"Ultraclops"	Khang Le, Chris Fisher, Gael Bertrand, Deodato Pangandoyon, Howard Chen	Cartoon Network
2019 (47th)	Carmen Sandiego	"Becoming Carmen Sandiego: Part 1"	Eastwood Wong, Sylvia Liu, Elaine Lee, Linda Fong, Emily Paik	Netflix
2019 (47th)	Rapunzel's Tangled Adventure	"Rapunzel and The Great Tree"	Alan Bodner, Brian Woods, Stephen Nicodemus, Laura Price, Leonard Robledo	Disney Channel
2019 (47th)	The Adventures of Rocky and Bullwinkle	"The Legend of the Power Gems: Chapter One"	Chris Mitchell, Chris Turnham, Tor Aunet, DanBob Thompson, Aaron Spurgeon	Prime Video

=== 2020s ===
Year	Program	Episode(s)	Recipient(s)	Network
2020 (48th)
2020 (48th)	Shooom's Odyssey		Julien Bisaro	Picolo Pictures
2020 (48th)	The Adventures of Paddington	"Paddington and Halloween"	Negar Bagheri	Nickelodeon
2020 (48th)	Baba Yaga		Glenn Hernandez, Matthieu Saghezchi	Baobab Studios
2020 (48th)	To: Gerard		Raymond Zibach	DreamWorks Animation
2020 (48th)	Trash Truck		Eastwood Wong, Sylvia Liu, Elaine Lee, Tor Aunet, Lauren Zurcher	Netflix
2021 (49th)
2021 (49th)	Arcane	"Happy Progress Day!"	Julien Georgel, Aymeric Kevin, Arnaud Baudry	Netflix
2021 (49th)	Yuki 7	"They Called Her Number Seven"	Chromosphere	
2021 (49th)	Arlo the Alligator Boy		Israel Sanchez, Margaret Wuller, Michelle Haejung Park, Kayla Jones, Tania Franco	Netflix
2021 (49th)	Love, Death + Robots	"Ice"	Robert Valley	Netflix
2021 (49th)	Maya and the Three	"The Sun and the Moon"	Jorge R. Gutierrez, Paul Sullivan, Gerald de Jesus, Richard Chen	Netflix
2022 (50th)
2022 (50th)	Oni: Thunder God's Tale	"The Demon Moon Rises"	Robert Kondo, Rachel Tiep-Daniels, Lia Tin, Yohei Hashizume, Masa Inada	Netflix
2022 (50th)	Genndy Tartakovsky's Primal	"Echoes of Eternity"	Scott Wills	Adult Swim
2022 (50th)	Mall Stories – Atilla the Grilla		Jasmin Lai, Lauren Zurcher, Junyi Wu	Chromosphere
2022 (50th)	The House		Niklas Nilsson, Alexandra Walker	Netflix
2022 (50th)	The Boy, the Mole, the Fox and the Horse		Mike McCain	Apple TV+
2023 (51st)
2023 (51st)	Blue Eye Samurai	"The Great Fire of 1657"	Toby Wilson, James Wilson, Emil Mitev	Netflix
2023 (51st)	Blue Eye Samurai	"Hammerscale"	Jason Scheier	Netflix
2023 (51st)	Scavengers Reign	"The Storm"	Charles Huettner, Jonathan Djob Nkondo, Pauline Mauvière, Hugo Moreno, Jon Juarez	Max
2023 (51st)	Star Wars: Visions	"Sith"	Carlos Salgado	Disney+
2023 (51st)	What If...?	"What If... Nebula Joined the Nova Corps?"	Paul Lasaine, Kristina Vardazaryan, Cynthia Halley, Ryan Magno, Simon Dunsdon	Disney+
2024 (52nd)
2024 (52nd)	Arcane	"The Dirt Under Your Nails"	Arnaud-Loris Baudry, Julien Georgel, Faustine Dumontier, Charlotte O'Neil	Netflix
2024 (52nd)	Dream Productions	"The Dream Team"	Bert Berry, Josh Holtsclaw	Disney+
2024 (52nd)	Orion and the Dark		Timothy Lamb, Christine Bian	Netflix
2024 (52nd)	Silly Sundays	"Stringy Soup"	Fran Bravo, Rosa Ballester Cabo	Cartoon Network
2024 (52nd)	WondLa	"Bargain"	Andy Harkness	Apple TV+
2025 (53rd)
2025 (53rd)	Love, Death & Robots	"How Zeke Got Religion"	Gigi Cavenago	Netflix
2025 (53rd)	Asterix and Obelix: The Big Fight	"Episode II"	Aurélien Prédal	Netflix
2025 (53rd)	Forevergreen		Jeremy Spears, Gregory Culp	Nathan Engelhardt and Jeremy Spears
2025 (53rd)	ParaNorman: The Thrifting		Thibault Leclercq, Santiago Montiel, Jung Woonyoung, Stephanie Bray-Lee	Laika
2025 (53rd)	Wednesdays with Gramps		Frederic Stewart	DreamWorks Animation
