= Criticism of Walt Disney Animation Studios =

Criticisms and controversies surrounding Walt Disney Animation Studios

Over the years, Walt Disney Animation Studios has faced criticism and controversy on a range of issues, including ethnic and racial stereotyping, sexism, and allegations that several of its animated films, including The Lion King, Atlantis: The Lost Empire, and Frozen, plagiarized existing works. The studio has also been accused of limiting and stereotyping LGBT representation in its films, and some of its films have drawn criticism from parents and advocacy groups over mature themes. Separately, Disney and its films have been the subject of controversy surrounding the Academy Awards, including remarks made during the 94th Academy Awards ceremony and accusations that the studio has had outsized influence over the Best Animated Feature category.

== Ethnic and racial stereotyping ==
Over the years many scholars, film critics, and parent groups have been critical of Disney for the stereotypical portrayal of non-white characters. Examples cited included the short Mickey's Mellerdrammer where Mickey Mouse dresses in blackface; the stereotypical "Black" Bird in the short Who Killed Cock Robin?; Sunflower the half-zebra/half-African servant centaurette in Fantasia; the film Song of the South, which depicts an idealized version of the lives of former slaves; the depiction of Native American 'Indians' as savages in Peter Pan; the cunning and manipulative Siamese cats Si and Am in Lady and the Tramp; and the jive talking crows in Dumbo (however in the latter instance some critics have defended the crows as being one of the few characters in the film sympathetic to Dumbo's plight since being a marginalized group they understand what it's like to be ostracized themselves).

Some people have used these stereotypes to accuse Walt Disney of being racist. During a story meeting on Snow White and the Seven Dwarfs, he referred to the scene when the dwarfs pile on top of each other as a "nigger pile" and during casting of Song of the South he used the term pickaninny. However, Disney biographer Neal Gabler argues that "Walt Disney was no racist. He never, either publicly or privately, made disparaging remarks about blacks or asserted white superiority. Like most white Americans of his generation, however, he was racially insensitive." The feature film Song of the South was criticized by contemporary film critics, the NAACP (National Association for the Advancement of Colored People), and others for its perpetuation of black stereotypes, but Disney became close friends with its star, James Baskett, describing him as "the best actor, I believe, to be discovered in years." Disney later campaigned successfully for Baskett to receive an Honorary Academy Award for his performance, the first black male actor so honored. Baskett died shortly afterward, and his widow wrote Disney a letter of gratitude for his support. Floyd Norman, the studio's first black animator who worked closely with Disney during the 1950s and 1960s, said, "Not once did I observe a hint of the racist behavior Walt Disney was often accused of after his death. His treatment of people‍—‌and by this I mean all people‍—‌can only be called exemplary."

Since its release in 1992, Disney's Aladdin has been accused of perpetuating racial and ethnic stereotypes of Arabs. In July 1993, Disney announced that it would alter a line in the film's opening song, "Arabian Nights", written by Howard Ashman and Alan Menken. In the original film, the song featured the lyrics, "Where they cut off your ear if they don't like your face/It's barbaric, but hey, it's home." After Arab-American groups complained that the line was derogatory to Middle Easterners, Disney amended the lyrics in later editions of the film to an alternate lyric written by Ashman: "Where it's flat and immense and the heat is intense/It's barbaric, but hey, it's home." Menken approved the change before its adoption, as did the estate of Ashman, who had died before the film's completion. The American-Arab Anti-Discrimination Committee further requested that the word "barbaric" be removed; however, Disney refused this, claiming that the word appeared in all versions of Ashman's text and it referred to the film's desert setting in the altered lyrics. Don Bustany, president of the ADC's Los Angeles chapter, argued that the existing alterations were "nowhere near adequate, considering the racism depicted in Aladdin ... there still remains the very sleazy, burlesque character in the prologue and the scene where a merchant is going to cut off the hand of Princess Jasmine because she took an apple from his stand to give to a hungry child." A March 1995 article published on the ADC's website further criticized Aladdin for depicting the film's protagonists, Aladdin and Jasmine, with light skin and Anglicized features in contrast to dark-skinned merchants and palace guards who were cruel, greedy, and vicious while featuring Arab accents and distorted facial features. Shortly after the film's release, Jack Shaheen, a professor of mass communications at Southern Illinois University, said that "Aladdin is not an entertaining Arabian Nights fantasy as film critics would have us believe, but rather a painful reminder to 3 million Americans of Arab heritage, as well as 300 million Arabs and others, that the abhorrent Arab stereotype is as ubiquitous as Aladdin's lamp."

== Sexism ==
In 1938, Walt Disney Productions sent a rejection letter to Mary Ford, stating that "girls are not considered" for creative positions. The letter was rediscovered in 2009 when Ford's grandson uploaded the image on Flickr. The letter received greater attention on January 7, 2014, when, after congratulating Emma Thompson for her Best Actress win at the National Board of Review Awards, Meryl Streep referenced the letter. Referencing Thompson's film, Saving Mr. Banks, Streep responded "It must have killed [Disney] to encounter a woman, an equally disdainful and superior creature, a person dismissive of his own considerable gifts and prodigious output and imagination." In response to Streep's statements, many Disney scholars and artists defended Disney, including Disney Legend Floyd Norman, who said "Much has changed, and changed for the better." Other journalists found the speech ironic, noting that Streep just finished filming the then-upcoming Disney film, Into the Woods.

The Walt Disney Company has also been criticized for the lack of feminist values seen in the older, original Disney Princesses. Snow White in particular is under constant criticism for her lack of feminist ideals. The film Snow White and the Seven Dwarfs (1937) features a main protagonist who, at the time, fit the domestic and docile expectations of women in the pre-World War II era. Snow White is displayed on screen covered in a long dress, embellished with a white collar, puffy sleeves, red cape, and a red bow constraining her hair; a traditional, modest feminine look that reveals minimal skin. Through her actions portrayed in the movie, she draws on the traditional femininity that was encouraged in 1930s American culture. In the midst of the Great Depression, women were encouraged to return to the home and care for the household, a theme that is widely displayed in Snow White and the Seven Dwarfs.

However, with the second resurgence of Disney movies (known as the Disney Renaissance) beginning in 1989 and ending in 1999, Disney transformed the damsel in distress into a strong woman with a desire for adventure. This new approach ushered in a decade of go-getting, proactive heroines who possessed character traits that coincided with the new era of acceptable roles in a society where women hold the same jobs as men. This is evident in princesses such as Ariel from The Little Mermaid (1989), Belle from Beauty and the Beast (1991), and Jasmine from Aladdin (1992)

=== Everyman ===
In the early 1950s, Goofy's Everyman short films are one of the basic film series that were notoriously regarded as sexist, resulting that women were not allowed to have their faces shown onscreen while keeping male characters as primary focuses. The Walt Disney Company has never discussed about the background of these short films to the public in later years as they were since dismissed prior to the production of Goof Troop in 1992. Several factors caused Disney to change Goofy's appearance as a single parent in subsequent Disney medias with further details undisclosed.

== Plagiarism ==
=== The Lion King ===
Several of Disney's animated feature films have been accused of plagiarizing existing works. The most notable and controversial example is The Lion King, which critics allege was plagiarized from Osamu Tezuka's Japanese manga ジャングル大帝 Janguru Taitei i.e. Jungle Emperor ジャングル大帝 and its anime adaptation of the same name (in Japan). This TV series was in turn dubbed and retitled Kimba the White Lion for English-speaking audiences by Titan Productions for NBC from 1965 to 1966, and it premiered on Los Angeles' KHJ-TV in September 1966. After Kimba's original run in the United States ended in the autumn of 1967, the series was shown in syndication on TV stations across the U.S. through September 30, 1978.

As a number of media journalists and fans watched The Lion King after its initial release in 1994, they noticed characters and events in the story resembling those of Kimba. Although the two works follow different screenplays, there are strong artistic similarities, and The Lion King contains numerous sequences that closely match up with Kimba's. Other similarities are thematically deeper and more pronounced, such as that both feature the theme of the circle of life. Alleged similarities in the characters, beginning with the protagonist lion cubs Kimba and Simba, include the evil lions, the one-eyed Claw and Scar, the sage baboons Dan'l Baboon and Rafiki, the talking birds Pauley Cracker and Zazu, and the pair of hyena sidekicks (it was a trio in the Disney film).

The Lion King co-director Rob Minkoff deflected criticism of similarities in the characters by stating it was "not unusual to have characters like a baboon, a bird or hyenas" in films set in Africa. Both films feature the protagonist looking up at cloudbursts in the shape of his father lion, as pointed out by Frederick L. Schodt. The similarity is alluded to in a scene from The Simpsons episode "'Round Springfield", where a parody of Mufasa (voiced by Harry Shearer) in the clouds tells Lisa Simpson, "You must avenge my death, Kimba ... dah, I mean Simba!".

White American actor Matthew Broderick has said that when he was hired as the voice of adult Simba in The Lion King, he presumed the project was related to Kimba the White Lion. "I thought he meant Kimba, who was a white lion in a cartoon when I was a little kid", said Broderick. "So I kept telling everybody I was going to play Kimba. I didn't really know anything about it, but I didn't really care." In addition, a memo written by Roy E. Disney in July 1993 refers to Simba as "Kimba", causing critics to claim that Disney was aware of the similarities.

Upon the release of The Lion King in Japan, several Japanese cartoonists including Machiko Satonaka signed a letter urging the Walt Disney Company acknowledge due credit to Jungle Emperor Leo in the making of The Lion King. As Tim Hornyak wrote in The Japan Times, "The Tezuka–Disney connection extends back decades before the movie. Tezuka met Walt Disney at the 1964 New York World's Fair, and Disney said he hoped to "make something just like" Tezuka's Astro Boy.The Lion King director Roger Allers claimed he remained unfamiliar with Kimba throughout production until his movie was nearly completed; co-director Rob Minkoff also said he was unfamiliar with Kimba.

=== Atlantis: The Lost Empire ===
The other Disney film, Atlantis: The Lost Empire (2001), was alleged for plagiarizing a Japanese animated series as well; many critics and viewers alike claimed it was plagiarized from one of the popular anime television shows ふしぎの海のナディア Fushigi no Umi no Nadia i.e. Nadia of the Mysterious Seas (Nadia: The Secret of Blue Water) ふしぎの海のナディア, more specifically in its character designs, setting and storyline. As noted by the viewers in Japan and America, the similarities became strong enough to call its production company Gainax to sue for plagiarism. They only refrained from doing so, according to Gainax member Yasuhiro Takeda, because the decision belonged to parent companies NHK and Toho. Hiroyuki Yamaga, another Gainax worker, was quoted in an interview in 2000 as: "We actually tried to get NHK to pick a fight with Disney, but even the National Television Network of Japan didn't dare to mess with Disney and their lawyers. ... We actually did say that but we wouldn't actually take them to court. We would be so terrified about what they would do to them in return that we wouldn't dare."

Although Disney never responded formally to those claims, co-director Kirk Wise posted on a Disney animation newsgroup in May 2001, "Never heard of Nadia till it was mentioned in this [newsgroup]. Long after we'd finished production, I might add." He claimed both Atlantis and Nadia were inspired, in part, by Jules Verne's 1870 novel Twenty Thousand Leagues Under the Seas. Speaking about the clarification, however, Lee Zion of Anime News Network wrote, "There are too many similarities not connected with 20,000 Leagues for the whole thing to be coincidence." As such, the whole affair ultimately entered popular culture as a convincing case of plagiarism. In 2018, Reuben Baron of Comic Book Resources added to Zion's comment stating, "Verne didn't specifically imagine magic crystal-based technology, something featured in both the Disney movie and the two similar anime. The Verne inspiration also doesn't explain the designs being suspiciously similar to Nadia's."

=== Other cases ===
In March 2014, animator Kelly Wilson sued Disney for plagiarism, alleging that the teaser trailer for Frozen was similar to her short film The Snowman. After four months of legal battling, federal judge Vince Chhabria ruled in Wilson's favor, citing evidence that Disney was aware of The Snowman and "the sequence of both works, from start to finish, is too parallel to conclude that no reasonable juror could find the works substantially similar." In April 2015, Chhabria explained that several Pixar employees had attended the 2011 San Francisco International Film Festival, in which The Snowman was screened four times alongside the Pixar short Play by Play. In June 2015, Entertainment Weekly reported that Disney had agreed to settle the case.

In March 2017, a year after the release of Disney's animated film Zootopia, screenwriter Gary L. Goldman sued Disney, claiming that he had pitched a similar idea to the studio in 2000 and again in 2009. According to a story in The Hollywood Reporter, Goldman alleged that Disney had stolen the film's title and various artwork from him after he offered the project. A Disney spokesperson dismissed the accusations, declaring that "Mr. Goldman's lawsuit is riddled with patently false allegations. It is an unprincipled attempt to lay claim to a successful film he didn't create, and we will vigorously defend against it in court."

== Accusations on Academy Awards ==
=== Remarks by actress as Disney princesses ===
Many animation pundits boycotted Disney and the Academy over remarking that animation was synonymously labeled as "kids" during the 94th Academy Awards in 2022. The award for the Best Animated Feature was presented by three actresses who portrayed the Disney princess characters in live-action remakes of their respective animated films: Lily James (Cinderella), Naomi Scott (Aladdin), and Halle Bailey (The Little Mermaid). While introducing the category, Bailey stated that animated films are "formative experiences as kids who watch them," as James put it, "So many kids watch these movies over and over, over and over again." Scott added: "I see some parents who know exactly what we're talking about."

The remarks sparked controversy and triggered most employees and filmmakers working in the animation industry as infantilizing the medium and perpetuating the stigma that animated works are strictly for children, especially since the industry was credited with sustaining the flow of Hollywood content and revenue during the height of the COVID-19 pandemic. An addition to the controversy was that the award for Best Animated Short Film (the nominees for which were mostly made up of shorts not aimed at children) was one of the eight categories that were omitted in the live broadcast; some speculations suggested that the speech played a role in the decision to not broadcast the award. The winner for the Best Animated Short award was The Windshield Wiper, a multilingual Spanish-American film which is considered adult animated, while another nominee in three categories: Best Animated Feature, Best Documentary Feature Film, and Best International Feature Film, was Flee, a PG-13 rated animated documentary about an Afghan refugee.

Phil Lord, co-producer of one of the nominated films, The Mitchells vs. the Machines, tweeted that it was "super cool to position animation as something that kids watch and adults have to endure." The film's official social media account responded to the joke with an image reading: "Animation is cinema." A week later, Lord and his producing partner Christopher Miller wrote a guest column in Variety criticizing the Academy for the remark and how Hollywood has been treating animation. The column commented that "no one set out to diminish animated films, but it's high time we set out to elevate them." Alberto Mielgo, director of The Windshield Wiper, later gave an acceptance speech for the Oscar: "Animation is an art that includes every single art that you can imagine. Animation for adults is a fact. It's happening. Let's call it cinema. I'm very honored because this is just the beginning of what we can do with animation." They also suggested to the Academy that the category should be presented by filmmakers who respect the art of animation as cinema.

=== Bribery on Best Animated Film category ===
Disney has been accused by many animation communities and spaces of supposedly bribing The Academy of Motion Picture Arts and Sciences into giving films from Walt Disney Animation and Pixar the award for Best Animated Film. Much of the criticism for this has been based on how, since 2008, the award has been dominated mostly by films made by Walt Disney Animation Studios and Pixar, with films from other studios almost exclusively being nominated. Directors of the nominated films have claimed that is actually better to be nominated because they know they will lose against Disney. The only exceptions to this have been Nickelodeon Movies' Rango in 2012, Sony Pictures Animation's Spider-Man: Into the Spider-Verse in 2019 and Netflix Animation's Guillermo del Toro's Pinocchio in 2023. Other criticism has been that some films of both studios didn't deserve the award, with a notable example being when Toy Story 4 won the award over SPA Animation's Klaus in 2020.

== LGBT references in Disney films ==
Disney has been criticized for limiting and stereotyping LGBT representation in its media, with LGBT topics previously being deemed not "family-friendly" to address directly by Disney while villains were often portrayed as queer-coded through gender non-conformance.

Controversy was stirred in the live-action remake Beauty and the Beast (2017), when director Bill Condon announced that Lefou would come out as a gay character and dance with a man named Stanley. As a result, a theater in Henagar, Alabama refused to screen the film.

In March 2020, the Pixar animated film Onward introduced Officer Specter, the first openly lesbian character in Disney media, voiced by the real-life lesbian actress Lena Waithe, who discusses that her girlfriend's daughter gets her pulling her hair out. This resulted to the film receiving backlash in several Middle Eastern countries such as Kuwait, Oman, Qatar and Saudi Arabia. The film is also censored in Russia, where the gay propaganda law officially criminalizes the dissemination of LGBT-related content to children under 18.

== Crunch and outsourcing practices ==
In 2021, several animation industry members from different foreign animation studios have spoken how Disney Television Animation doesn't credit the animators of foreign studios who animate their shows, explaining that they only credit the name of the animation studio as "Animation Services by", with the only productions who have credited the animators of the animation houses have been The Lion Guard, Monsters at Work, Moon Girl and Devil Dinosaur, Kiff, Zombies: The Re-Animated Series, StuGo, Mickey Mouse Clubhouse+ and Prep & Landing: The Snowball Protocol.

In February 2024, former Disney CEO Bob Iger officially announced that a proposed Moana series had been reworked into a theatrical sequel titled Moana 2 with David Derrick Jr, Jason Hand, and Dana Ledoux Mille attached as directors. Iger explained that this occurred after Disney executives saw early footage: "We were impressed with what we saw and knew it deserved a theatrical release". Animation was handled at Walt Disney Animation Studios' Vancouver studio when it was being developed as a series, while pre-production and storyboarding took place at the Burbank studio. The announcement to retooling the TV series into a feature film was met with mixed reception within the animation industry with some concerns with the staff at Walt Disney Animation Studios Vancouver being under "crunch" as the changes for retooling the TV series as a film started in early 2024. In May 2025, The Animation Guild published a report estimating that as a result of Disney Animation's decision to largely outsource the animation work to its new Vancouver studio, California had lost as much as 817 jobs, $87 million in wages, and $178 million in state gross domestic product.

In September 2024, former Pixar Animation Studios employees sat down with IGN to discuss the "crunch" practices that the studio had during the production of Inside Out 2 as the film was pressured by Disney execs to become a box-office success with some of the film's staff working overtime and others being part of the Pixar layoffs during the Spring of 2024 without receiving their respective payment for their additional work.

== See also ==
- Criticism of the Walt Disney Company
