= Tron: Uprising =

2012–2013 animated television series

- Genre: Action-adventure; Cyberpunk; Science fiction; Superhero
- Based on: Tron by: Steven Lisberger; Bonnie MacBird
- Developed by: Edward Kitsis; Adam Horowitz
- Directed by: Charlie Bean; Robert Valley
- Voices of: Elijah Wood; Bruce Boxleitner; Mandy Moore; Nate Corddry; Lance Henriksen; Emmanuelle Chriqui; Reginald VelJohnson; Paul Reubens; Tricia Helfer
- Composer: Joseph Trapanese
- Country of origin: United States
- Original language: English
- No. of seasons: 1
- No. of episodes: 19

Production
- Executive producer: Charlie Bean
- Editor: Sean Coyle
- Running time: 22-31 minutes
- Production companies: Disney Television Animation; Polygon Pictures; Sean Bailey Productions

Original release
- Network: Disney XD
- Release: May 18, 2012 – January 28, 2013

Related
- Tron; Tron: Legacy

Tron: Uprising is an American animated science fiction television series produced by Disney Television Animation. Set in the Tron fictional universe, the series takes place between the events of the films Tron (1982) and Tron: Legacy (2010). The series was mainly directed by Charlie Bean, who also acted as executive producer, while Justin Springer, Edward Kitsis, and Adam Horowitz served as consulting producers. It revolves around Beck, a young program who becomes involved in an insurrection inside the computer world of the Grid.

A total of 19 episodes were produced and aired on Disney XD in the United States from May 18, 2012, to January 28, 2013.

== Synopsis ==
Beck is a young, anthropomorphized computer program who becomes involved in a revolution inside computer world of the Grid against the villainous Clu 2.0 and his henchmen. Beck adopts the persona of legendary warrior Tron and becomes the enemy of General Tesler. Subsequently, he is trained by the actual Tron, who also mentors him to grow into a courageous and powerful leader.

== Characters ==
=== Main ===
- Beck (voiced by Elijah Wood) is a young program who leads a revolution against Clu. He is referred to by the public as "Tron" and "the Renegade".
- Tron (voiced by Bruce Boxleitner) is the original protector of the Grid who was supposedly killed by Clu. Unable to protect the Grid due to his injuries, Tron sought out a new protector and found Beck whom he trains.
- Mara (voiced by Mandy Moore) is a co-worker and friend of Beck.
- Zed (voiced Nate Corddry) is a co-worker and friend of Beck.
- General Tesler (voiced by Lance Henriksen) is Clu 2.0's henchman and the main antagonist of the series.
  - Paige (voiced by Emmanuelle Chriqui) is one of Tesler's field commanders.
  - Pavel (voiced by Paul Reubens) is Tesler's second-in-command.
- Able (voiced by Reginald VelJohnson) is the owner of the eponymous garage and Beck's, Mara's, and Zed's boss.
- The Grid (voiced by Tricia Helfer) is the narrator.

=== Recurring ===
- Clu 2.0 (voiced by Fred Tatasciore; previously portrayed by Jeff Bridges in the live action movies) is an A.I. program created by Kevin Flynn in his own image who has goals of creating the perfect world. Clu betrayed Flynn and Tron, then took over the Grid.
  - Tatasciore also voices Kevin Flynn in the episode "Scars".
- Bartik (voiced by Donald Faison) is a program who joined a task force formed by Paige to hunt down the Renegade.
- Hopper (voiced by Paul Scheer) is a program who joined a task force formed by Paige to hunt down the Renegade.
- Dyson (voiced by John Glover) is a former member of Tron's squadron.
- Perl (voiced by Kate Mara) is a member of a criminal gang.
- Cyrus (voiced by Aaron Paul) is Tron's former apprentice.
- Keller (voiced by Marcia Gay Harden) is a scientific program employed by Tesler.
- Cutler (voiced by Lance Reddick) is a veteran of the Isomorphic Algorithm (ISO) wars.
- Quorra (voiced by Olivia Wilde) is an ISO. Wilde reprised her role from Tron: Legacy.
- Link (voiced by David Arquette) is a resident of Argon.
- Gorn (voiced by Kathryn Hunter) is a technician specializing in disc manipulation.

== Episodes ==
No.	Title	Directed by	Written by	Original release date	Viewers (millions)
1	"Beck's Beginning"	Charlie Bean	Edward Kitsis & Adam Horowitz	May 18, 2012	1.79
After his city is invaded and a friend killed by Clu's soldiers, a young program named Beck takes the name of "Tron" and, aided by the real Tron, fights back. (31-minute prelude episode, initially produced as a 10-segment miniseries.)
2	"The Renegade, Part 1"	Charlie Bean	Written by : Kamran Pasha & Adam Nussdorf & Bill Wolkoff; Story by : Edward Kitsis & Adam Horowitz	June 7, 2012	0.58
As Tron trains Beck, Beck begins to doubt that he can be the next Tron. While trying to evade security, Beck lands in a prison transport and is taken to the games. Meanwhile, Zed falls for a female named Perl and brings her to the garage to show her his work, where she steals Able's classic ENCOM 786.: Guest Star: Ben Schwartz as Rilo
3	"The Renegade, Part 2"	Charlie Bean	Written by : Kamran Pasha & Adam Nussdorf & Bill Wolkoff; Story by : Edward Kitsis & Adam Horowitz	June 14, 2012	0.37
When Beck and Cutler are thrown into a deathmatch, Cutler forfeits and Beck has to return as the Renegade to rescue him.
4	"Blackout"	Charlie Bean	Edward Kitsis & Adam Horowitz	June 21, 2012	0.54
Beck is sent by Tron to destroy an Occupation-manned energy drill causing power blackouts in Argon City before its destructive power destabilizes the Grid.
5	"Identity"	Charlie Bean	Bill Wolkoff	June 28, 2012	0.38
When Beck's identity disc is stolen on the Light Rail, his memory begins to unravel. Hoping to prevent permanent memory loss or identification as the Renegade, he and Tron go to Purgos, Argon City's closest neighbor, to recover it.: Guest Star: Lake Bell as Lux, Mark Boone Junior as Kobol, and Adam DeVine as Galt
6	"Isolated"	Charlie Bean	André Bormanis	July 5, 2012	0.36
After stealing a valuable data cube from General Tesler's ship, Beck (as the Renegade) is chased by Paige over the Sea of Simulation. When they crash on a destabilized island, Paige reflects on the events that led her to becoming a soldier of the Occupation.: Guest Star: Parminder Nagra as Ada and Olivia Wilde as Quorra
7	"Price of Power"	Charlie Bean	Adam Nussdorf	July 12, 2012	0.35
Beck intercepts a disk modification that enhances the physical abilities of any program who wears it, but it has some unfortunate side effects.
8	"The Reward"	Charlie Bean	Written by : Scott Nimerfro & André Bormanis; Story by : André Bormanis	October 19, 2012	N/A
When General Tesler offers a reward, as well as the lifting of Argon City's curfew, for the capture of the Renegade, programs all over Argon City began to falsely accuse each other.
9	"Scars, Part 1"	Charlie Bean	Bill Wolkoff	October 26, 2012	N/A
Dyson, once Tron's lieutenant and now high-ranking in Clu's takeover, comes to Argon City to check up on Tessler.
10	"Scars, Part 2"	Charlie Bean	Bill Wolkoff	November 2, 2012	N/A
Beck seeks to stop Tron from killing Dyson.
11	"Grounded"	Charlie Bean	Adam Nussdorf	December 3, 2012	N/A
A furious Tesler publicly challenges the Renegade to appear in Argon Square and surrender himself, promising to free additional prisoners and end the curfew if he does so. Beck accepts the challenge and narrowly escapes capture. Able later reveals that he knows that Beck is the Renegade.
12	"We Both Know How This Ends"	Charlie Bean	Adam Nussdorf & Akela Cooper	December 10, 2012	N/A
Able heads to the Outlands to confront Tron over his use of Beck as the Renegade, leaving Mara in charge of the garage.
13	"The Stranger"	Charlie Bean	Scott Nimerfro & Adam Nussdorf and Ryan Mottesheard	December 17, 2012	N/A
On a trip to Gallium City through a storm, Beck discovers a one-way portal. He also learns that he wasn't the first program that Tron had trained as a renegade.
14	"Tagged"	Charlie Bean	Adam Nussdorf & Bill Wolkoff	December 24, 2012	N/A
The Renegade recruits three programs who caught his attention by tagging the grid with the message, "Tron Lives." He discovers one of them is Mara.: Guest Star: Jamie Hector as Moog and Jack Huston as Rasket
15	"State of Mind"	Charlie Bean	Written by : Bill Wolkoff & Adam Nussdorf; Story by : Mark Litton	December 31, 2012	N/A
Tesler uses a mind-control agent to build an army. When Mara falls victim to it, Zed and the Renegade work together to help rescue her.
16	"Welcome Home"	Robert Valley	Written by : Scott Nimerfro & Donna Thorland; Story by : Scott Nimerfro & Donna Thorland & Adam Prince	January 7, 2013	N/A
Beck tries to rescue a fleeing government scientist before Paige and the Occupation finds her; Paige and Beck become passengers on the same runaway train and Beck must save the innocent programs on the train without revealing his identity.: Guest Star: Matt Jones as Lenz and Paul Rust as Ott
17	"Rendezvous"	Charlie Bean	Bill Wolkoff	January 14, 2013	N/A
Beck and Paige go out on a date, and Paige begins to see Beck's views. Meanwhile, Pavel tests the augmentation boost, but Paige catches him, misconstruing Beck's advice. Tired of her interference, Pavel plots to get rid of Paige once and for all, while Beck decides that an appearance by the Renegade may finally win Paige over.: Guest Star: Matt Jones as Erg
18	"No Bounds"	Charlie Bean	Written by : Scott Nimerfro; Story by : Scott Nimerfro & Donna Thorland	January 21, 2013	N/A
Cyrus, seeking revenge on Beck and Tron, impersonates the Renegade and kills an innocent program. With the city against him, Beck is forced to make the difficult choice of saving Tron or his friends.
19	"Terminal"	Charlie Bean	Scott Nimerfro & Adam Nussdorf & Donna Thorland	January 28, 2013	N/A
Tron tells Beck that he is dying and that the only way to stop his illness is to use the Occupation's new super recognizer.

== Production ==
=== Design ===
The series features an animation style that mixes 2D animation and CGI animation. The look of the series was inspired by Star Wars: The Clone Wars, ThunderCats, and Aeon Flux.

Director Charlie Bean explained "the idea was to create a distinct style for the CG show not seen elsewhere on television or in film." He worked closely with art director Alberto Mielgo, character designer Robert Valley (animation artist for the Gorillaz music videos) and lead vehicle designer Daniel Simon, who was previously responsible for many vehicle designs in the Tron: Legacy feature film, including the light cycles. Mielgo won the Primetime Emmy Award for his art direction in 2013.

=== Casting ===
In December 2010, it was announced that Elijah Wood, Bruce Boxleitner, Lance Henriksen, Emmanuelle Chriqui, Mandy Moore, Paul Reubens, Nate Corddry and Reginald VelJohnson would voice characters in a television series based on the Tron franchise, titled Tron: Uprising.

=== Cancellation ===
On January 14, 2013, producer Edward Kitsis responded to rumors of cancellation by stating, "I don't know what the future [of Tron: Uprising] is now. I know at the present, I can say we need more viewers."

Disney XD moved the program in the broadcast schedule to Monday mornings at 12:00 AM Eastern until the first season episodes finished airing on January 28, 2013.

== Release ==
=== Marketing ===
A trailer for the series, with a voice-over by Bruce Boxleitner, was released online in May 2012. and on the home video releases of Tron: Legacy, on April 5, 2011. Disney XD presented CGI models of characters, concept art, and the original trailer that was with the home releases of Tron: Legacy at San Diego Comic-Con in 2011. Disney released the first, pre-season episode on May 18, 2012, in which the full 31-minute episode was featured on Disney XD on Demand, YouTube, Facebook, iTunes a week earlier. The prelude episode was broadcast only on Disney Channel, and was originally going to be a 10-part miniseries.

=== Streaming ===
On May 9, 2013, it was announced that Disney had reached an agreement with Netflix wherein Tron: Uprising would appear on the streaming service, however it was removed one year later. The full series was later added for streaming on Disney+, which was released in November 2019.

== Music ==
The series is scored by Joseph Trapanese, who arranged Daft Punk's score for Tron: Legacy. A soundtrack album for the score was released digitally and manufacture on demand CD by Walt Disney Records on January 8, 2013. Trapanese later digitally released two extended plays for the show featuring additional tracks not heard on the initial product: Tron: Uprising - Hero EP in 2015 and Tron: Uprising - Occupied EP in 2020.

== Reception ==
=== Critical response ===
The series premiere earned mostly positive reviews. IGN gave the episode "Beck's Beginning" a ranking of 8 out of 10. On the review aggregator website Rotten Tomatoes, 100% of 5 critics' reviews for the first season are positive.

Over time, the series developed a cult following among fans of the Tron franchise, with many praising its animation style, darker tone, and world-building.

=== Awards and nominations ===
Award	Category	Recipient	Result
40th Annie Awards	Best Animated Special Production (Episode: Beck's Beginning)	Tron: Uprising	Nominated
40th Annie Awards	Character Design in a Television Production (Episode: The Renegade, Part 1)	Robert Valley	Won
40th Annie Awards	Production Design in a Television Production (Episode: The Stranger)	Alberto Mielgo	Won
40th Annie Awards	Storyboarding in a Television Production (Episode: The Reward)	Kalvin Lee & Robert Valley	Nominated
65th Primetime Emmy Awards	Outstanding Individual Achievement In Animation – Art Direction (Episode: The Stranger)	Alberto Mielgo	Won
