= Pear Cider and Cigarettes =

- Film poster
- Directed by: Robert Valley
- Written by: Robert Valley
- Produced by: Cara Speller
- Production company: Massive Swerve Studios
- Distributed by: Passion Pictures Animation
- Release date: July 1, 2016 (USA)
- Running time: 35 minutes
- Countries: Canada; UK
- Language: English

Pear Cider and Cigarettes is a 2016 Canadian animated short film written and directed by Robert Valley and produced by Cara Speller. The film and the graphic novel of the same name are based on a true story.

== Plot ==
Hard-living Techno Stypes has been Robert's best friend since childhood, and over the years, Robert has been amazed by Techno's ability to self-sabotage. When Techno is hospitalized in China and needs a liver transplant, Robert goes on a wild ride to get him home to Vancouver.

== Accolades ==
Award	Date of ceremony	Category	Recipient(s)	Result	Ref(s)
Academy Awards	February 26, 2017	Best Animated Short Film	Robert Valley and Cara Speller	Nominated	
Annie Awards	February 2017	Best Animated Special Production	Massive Swerve Studios and Passion Pictures Animation	Won	

== See also ==
- Alcoholism
- Drug addiction
