= Lotus C-01 =

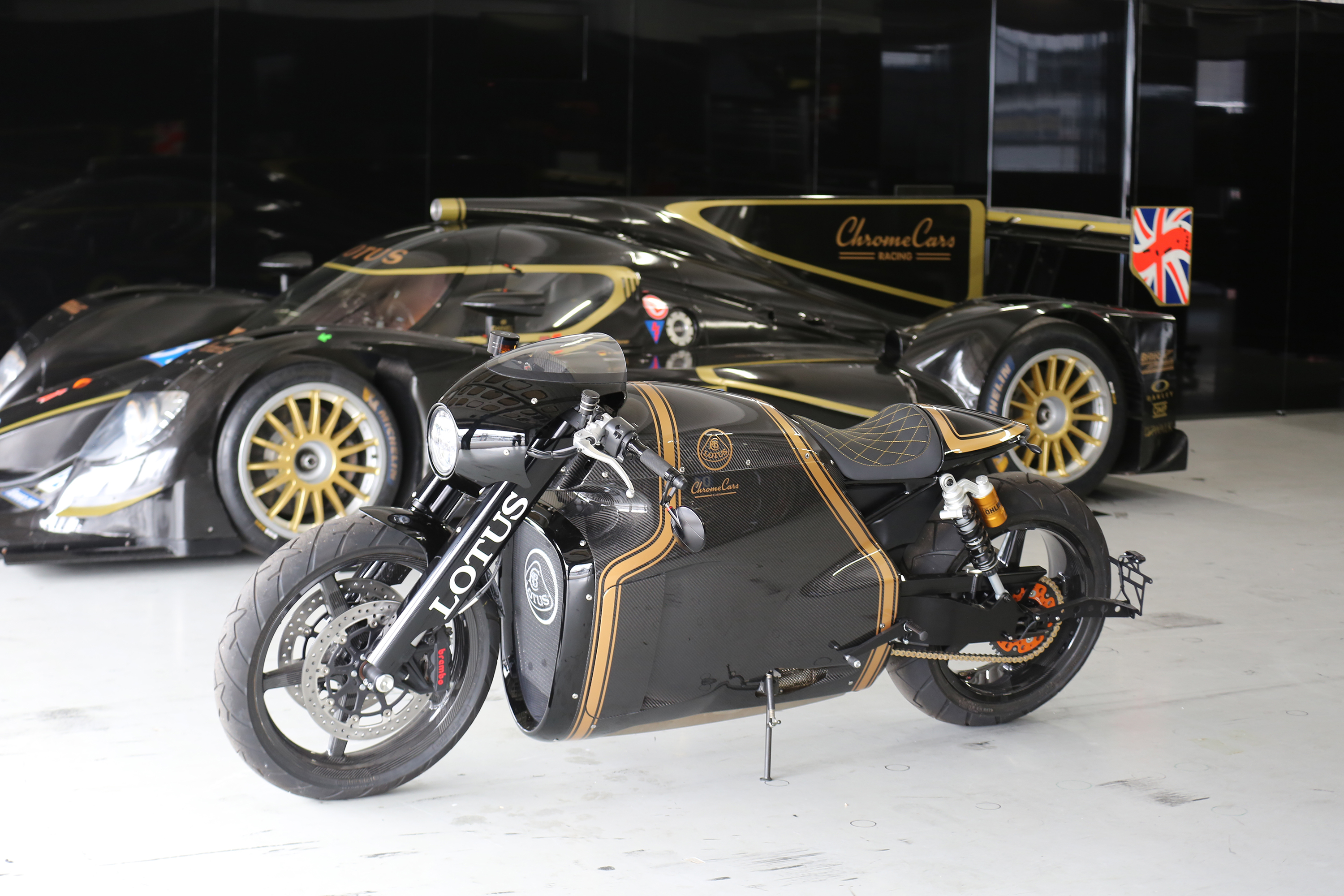
- Manufacturer: Kodewa
- Class: Power cruiser
- Engine: 1,195 cc 75° V-twin
- Bore / stroke: 105 × 69 mm
- Power: c. 200 hp (150 kW)
- Transmission: 6-speed sequential, chain drive
- Frame type: Steel/titanium/carbon fiber
- Suspension: Front: Upside-down telescopic fork Rear: Twinshock
- Brakes: Front: 2 × 320 mm disc, 4-piston calipers Rear: 1 × 220 mm disc, 2-piston caliper
- Wheelbase: 1,645 mm
- Seat height: 710 mm
- Weight: 181 kg (399 lb) (dry)
- Fuel capacity: 10.5 L (2.3 imp gal; 2.8 US gal)

The Lotus C-01 is a concept motorcycle revealed in 2014. It was manufactured by Kodewa under brand license from Group Lotus. It was designed by Daniel Simon, using a carbon fiber monocoque body shell described as "menacingly retro-futuristic", and "la science-fiction rejoint la réalité" or "science fiction joined with reality". A commentator called it "sort of a power cruiser" comparing it to the European exotic Ducati Diavel power cruiser.

The engine is a 200 hp tuned version of the 75 degree v-twin Rotax motor used in the KTM RC8R superbike.

== Specifications ==
Specifications in the adjacent box are from Gizmag.
