= Alberto Mielgo =

Spanish director, artist, and animator

- Born: Madrid, Spain
- Occupations: Animator; artist; director
- Known for: Tron: Uprising, Love, Death & Robots: The Witness episode, Spider-Man: Into the Spider-Verse, The Beatles: Rock Band
- Website: http://www.albertomielgo.com/

Alberto Mielgo is a Spanish director, artist, and animator. His accolades include an Academy Award, four Emmy Awards and two Annie Awards. Mielgo was an Art Director at Disney's Tron: Uprising (2013) and made his debut as a director with animated short film "The Witness" (2019) created for Netflix anthology: Love, Death & Robots.

== Early life ==
Born and raised in Spain, Mielgo is currently established in Los Angeles, after having worked and lived in various countries of Asia and Europe.

== Career ==
Mielgo currently directs animations, and works as an Art Director. While in London, Mielgo worked as an Art Director for Passion Pictures with Pete Candeland, with whom he worked on The Beatles: Rock Band and Gorillaz projects.

Mielgo's notable early projects include Tim Burton's Corpse Bride, The Beatles: Rock Band, both parts of Harry Potter and the Deathly Hallows and Tron: Uprising by Disney, for which he won in 2013 an Emmy Award and an Annie Award.

Mielgo was hired by Disney as an Art Director for the animated TV series Tron: Uprising in 2013. The Director of Tron: Uprising Charlie Bean explained that the idea was to create a very special style for the digital show, which was not seen on TV or in the movies. Bean worked closely with Mielgo, character designer Robert Valley, and supervising car designer Daniel Simon. Simon was responsible for the vehicle designs seen in Tron: Legacy, including the Light Cycles. Mielgo won the Emmy Primetime Award for Outstanding Art Direction in 2013.

In 2015, Mielgo was a Production Designer/Art Director for Sony's Spider-Man: Into the Spider-Verse and created an early animation test for the film. At first, his main goal was to explore the world, comics, the past of Spider-Man, cinematography, language, style and opportunities. The test animation was never completed – only four shots were completely finished and determined the visual language of the film.

In 2019, Mielgo wrote, designed and directed "The Witness" episode for Netflix animation anthology series Love, Death & Robots, which won three Emmys and an Annie award. Mielgo's involvement with the series began when he was approached by its supervising director, Gabriele Pennacchioli, who put him in touch with David Fincher and Tim Miller.

In 2021 and 2022 Mielgo directed two animated short films; The Windshield Wiper, a personal project focused on his vision of love and relationships, which won the Academy Award for Best Animated Short Film at the 94th Academy Awards, and Jibaro for Love, Death & Robots.

In 2025 Mielgo wrote and directed a short film doubling as a reveal cinematic for the upcoming extraction shooter game Marathon developed by studio Bungie.

== Awards ==
Mielgo won a Primetime Emmy Award (2013), and an Annie Award (2013) for his work on Disney's Tron: Uprising as Best Production Designer.

Mielgo won three Emmy Awards (2019) for Best Animated Short, Best Art Direction, Best Animation, and an Annie award (2019) for Best Art Direction of "The Witness" episode for Netflix Animation anthology Love, Death & Robots.

In March 2022, he won an Academy Award for Best Animated Short Film for The Windshield Wiper.

In September 2022, the "Jibaro" episode of Love, Death, & Robots, written and directed by Mielgo, won the 2022 Primetime Emmy Award for Outstanding Short Form Animated Program.
