= The Windshield Wiper =

- Poster
- Directed by: Alberto Mielgo
- Written by: Alberto Mielgo
- Produced by: Alberto Mielgo; Leo Sánchez
- Cinematography: Jonathan Catalán
- Edited by: Alberto Mielgo
- Music by: Alberto Mielgo
- Production companies: Pastel Productions; Leo Sanchez Studio; Pinkman TV; Many Enterprises
- Distributed by: The Animation Showcase
- Release date: July 13, 2021 (Cannes)
- Running time: 14 minutes
- Countries: United States; Spain
- Languages: English; Romanian

The Windshield Wiper is a 2021 adult animated short film written, produced, and directed by Alberto Mielgo. The film won Best Animated Short Film at the 94th Academy Awards.

== Plot ==
Inside a cafe while smoking a whole pack of cigarettes, a man poses an ambitious question: "What is Love?". A collection of vignettes and situations will lead the man to the desired conclusion.

== Release ==
The film had its premiere during the Cannes Film Festival 2021 at the Directors' Fortnight and release on The Animation Showcase a private industry streaming platform.

== Accolades ==
Since its launch, the film has been selected in various festivals around the world:

Year	Ceremony	Award/Category	Status
2021	Cannes Film Festival	Directors' Fortnight	Nominated
2021	Valladolid International Film Festival	Best Short Film	Nominated
2022	Academy Awards	Best Animated Short Film	Won
