= Andy Bialk =

American animator and character designer

- Born: Andrew D. Bialk; November 16, 1971 (age 54); San Diego, California, U.S.
- Occupations: Animator, storyboard artist, character designer
- Years active: 1991–present
- Spouse: Halle Pickering
- Children: Lena Bialk; Rose Bialk

Andrew D. Bialk (born November 16, 1971) is an American animator, storyboard artist and character designer. He is best known for his work as a character designer on the Cartoon Network series Dexter's Laboratory and The Powerpuff Girls. He was also known for portraying a high school student in the music video for Nirvana's "Smells Like Teen Spirit".

== Education ==
- BA, Studio Arts, emphasis animation & Graphic design at the Loyola Marymount University (1989-1993).

== Filmography ==
=== Television ===
Year	Title	Notes
1995–1996	The Cartoon Cartoon Show	layout artist
1996–2003	Dexter's Laboratory	character designer/background designer/model designer/layout artist/storyboard artist
1997	Nightmare Ned	background layout
1998–2004	The Powerpuff Girls	model/character supervisor
1999	Oh Yeah! Cartoons	storyboard artist ("Playing a Hunch")
2001	Samurai Jack	property designer
2004–2007	Foster's Home for Imaginary Friends	character designer
2005	Star Wars: Clone Wars	character layout
2005	The X's	additional character designer
2005–2006	Super Robot Monkey Team Hyper Force Go!	lead character designer
2005–2006	Johnny Test	character designer
2010	The Penguins of Madagascar	character designer
2010	The Ricky Gervais Show	character designer
2010	Sym-Bionic Titan	character designer
2010–2011	Scooby-Doo! Mystery Incorporated	background painter
2012–2013	DreamWorks Dragons	character designer
2013	The Awesomes	original character design
2014–2015	Mickey Mouse	character designer
2015–2016	Shimmer and Shine	art director/original character design

=== Film ===
Year	Title	Notes
2002	The Powerpuff Girls Movie	character designer
2008	Madagascar: Escape 2 Africa	character designer
2010	How to Train Your Dragon	character designer
2010	Shrek Forever After	character designer
2010	Megamind	character designer
2012	Madagascar 3: Europe's Most Wanted	character designer (uncredited)
2013	Free Birds	character designer (uncredited)
2014	The Lego Movie	concept artist and designer
2014	The Book of Life	character designer
2015	The SpongeBob Movie: Sponge Out of Water	character designer
2015	Hell and Back	lead character designer
2017	The Emoji Movie	visual development artist
2018	The Grinch	character designer
2018	Spider-Man: Into the Spider-Verse	visual development artist
2021	Vivo	character design

=== Music videos ===
Year	Song	Artist	Role
1991	Smells Like Teen Spirit	Nirvana	High School Teenager
1992	Smells Like Nirvana	"Weird Al" Yankovic	Extra
1992	100%	Sonic Youth	Extra

== Awards and nominations ==
Year	Award	Category	Work	Result
2004	Annie Awards	Outstanding Character Design in an Animated Television Production	The Powerpuff Girls "Save Mojo"	Nominated
2010	Emmy Awards	Outstanding Individual Achievement in Animation - Character Design	The Ricky Gervais Show "Charity"	Won
2011	Annie Awards	Outstanding Character Design in a Television Production	The Ricky Gervais Show	Nominated
2013	Annie Awards	Outstanding Character Design in an Animated Television Production	Dragons: Riders of Berk "Alvin and the Outcasts"	Nominated
2013	Emmy Awards	Outstanding Individual Achievement in Animation - Character Design	Dragons: Riders of Berk "We Are Family (Part 2)"	Won
2014	Annie Awards	Outstanding Character Design in an Animated Television Production	The Awesomes	Nominated
