= Daniel Simon =

German concept designer and automotive futurist

- Born: 1975 (age 50–51); Stralsund, Germany
- Occupations: concept designer and automotive futurist
- Known for: Cosmic Motors
- Notable work: TRON: Legacy, Captain America: The First Avenger, Tron: Uprising, Oblivion
- Website: http://danielsimon.com/

Daniel Simon (born 1975) is a German concept designer and automotive futurist. He is best known for his vehicle designs in movies like Tron: Legacy and Oblivion, and his book Cosmic Motors.

== Early life ==
Simon grew up in Stralsund, Germany. From an early age he was interested in drawing cars from imagination, and at the age of 16 he decided to become a car designer. In 2001, Simon obtained his degree in automotive design at the University of Applied Science, Pforzheim.

== Automotive career ==
Simon began his design career in 1999 at Volkswagen (Wolfsburg) under the leadership of Hartmut Warkuss and designed cars for Seat and Lamborghini under the supervision of Walter de Silva. In 2001 he was contracted by the Volkswagen Group's advanced studio (Design Center Europe, Sitges), where he participated in the reincarnation of the Bugatti brand. He left the Volkswagen Group as a senior designer after completing a concept car in 2005. Between 2005 and 2007, Simon continued consulting for Bugatti and developed futuristic virtual vehicles for his book Cosmic Motors, published in 2007 by Design Studio Press. Upon its release, Cosmic Motors topped the automotive best-seller list of online retailer Amazon.com. It has received positive reviews from design icons such as Chris Bangle, Freeman Thomas, Syd Mead and Ryan Church.

In 2011, Simon was appointed to "create a dynamic new corporate image" for the Hispania Formula One team's second season in Formula 1. He designed the livery of the team's F111 car.

The newly established Lotus Motorcycles group hired Simon in 2013 as the designer for the first Lotus Motorcycle C-01.

== Film design career ==
Simon was hired in 2008 as vehicle concept designer on Tron: Legacy, the sequel to the 1982 film Tron by the Disney Studios, and relocated from Germany to Los Angeles, California. He was involved in the creation of the Light Cycles, the Light Runner, the Light Jets, and several background vehicles. In 2009, he became lead vehicle designer for Marvel Studios' 2011 Captain America: The First Avenger, under the production design of Rick Heinrichs and creative guidance of director Joe Johnston, creating unique land, sea and air vehicles for the movie. After collaborating with director Ridley Scott on early vehicle concepts for Prometheus in 2010, Simon served for over one year as the designer of the Bubbleship for the 2013 Universal sci-fi film Oblivion.

== Awards and nominations ==
Year	Award	Organization	Work	Category	Result
2010	ADG Excellence in Production Design Award	Art Directors Guild	TRON: Legacy	Fantasy Film	Nominated
2011	ADG Excellence in Production Design Award	Art Directors Guild	Captain America: The First Avenger	Fantasy Film	Nominated
