= 44th Annie Awards =

US media awards ceremony held in 2017

- Date: February 4, 2017
- Site: Royce Hall; Los Angeles, California, U.S.
- Hosted by: Stephanie Sheh
- Organized by: ASIFA-Hollywood

Highlights
- Best Animated Feature: Zootopia
- Best Direction: Byron Howard and Rich Moore; Zootopia
- Most awards: Zootopia (6)
- Most nominations: Zootopia (11)

The 44th Annual Annie Awards honoring excellence in the field of animation of 2016 took place on February 4, 2017, at the University of California, Los Angeles's Royce Hall in Los Angeles, California, presenting in 36 categories.

== Production categories ==
On November 28, 2016, the nominations for Annie Awards were announced. Zootopia earned the most number of nominations with 11, followed by Kubo and the Two Strings with 10.

Best Animated Feature	Best Animated Special Production
Zootopia – Walt Disney Animation Studios; Finding Dory – Pixar; Kubo and the Two Strings – Laika; Kung Fu Panda 3 – DreamWorks Animation; Moana – Walt Disney Animation Studios	Pear Cider and Cigarettes – Massive Swerve Studios and Passion Pictures Animation; Audrie & Daisy – A production of AfterImage Public Media in association with Actual Films for Netflix; Kung Fu Panda: Secrets of the Scroll – DreamWorks Animation; Little Big Awesome – Titmouse, Inc and Amazon Studios; Middle School: The Worst Years of My Life – CBS Films/J.P. Entertainment/Participant Media
Best Animated Short Subject	Best Animated TV/Broadcast Commercial
Piper – Pixar; Blind Vaysha – National Film Board of Canada; Deer Flower – Studio ZAZAC; Path Title Sequence – Acme Filmworks; Pearl – Google Spotlight Stories/Evil Eye Pictures	Loteria 'Night Shift' – Passion Pictures Ltd; Duelyst – Powerhouse Animation Studios, Inc.; Lego Star Wars: The Force Awakens Trailer – Plastic Wax; Lily & the Snowman – Hornet; The Importance of Paying Attention: Teeth – Bill Plympton Studio
Best General Audience Animated TV/Broadcast Production For Preschool Children	Best Animated TV/Broadcast Production For Children's Audience
Tumble Leaf – Episode: Mighty Mud Movers / Having a Ball – Amazon Studios and Bix Pix Entertainment; Ask the StoryBots – Episode: Why Do I Have to Brush My Teeth? – JibJab Bros. Studios for Netflix; Peg + Cat – Episode: The Disappearing Art – Problem – The Fred Rogers Company/9ate7 Productions; Puffin Rock – The First Snow – Episode: 59 – Cartoon Saloon, Dog Ears, Penguin Random House; The Stinky & Dirty Show – Episode: Squeak – Amazon Studios and Brown Bag Films	Adventure Time – Episode: Bad Jubies – Bix Pix Entertainment, Cartoon Network, Frederator Studios; DreamWorks Voltron: Legendary Defender – Episode: Return of the Gladiator – DreamWorks Animation; Elena of Avalor – Episode: A Day to Remember – Disney Television Animation; Teenage Mutant Ninja Turtles – Episode: Trans-Dimensional Turtles – Nickelodeon; Wander Over Yonder – Episode: My Fair Hatey – Disney Television Animation
Best General Audience Animated TV/Broadcast Production	Best Animated Feature — Independent
Bob's Burgers – Episode: Glued, Where's My Bob? – Bento Box Entertainment; BoJack Horseman – Episode: Fish Out of Water – Tornante Productions, LLC for Netflix; Long Live the Royals – Episode: Punk Show – Cartoon Network Studios; The Simpsons – Episode: Barthood – Gracie Films in Association with 20th Century Fox Television; The Venture Bros. – Episode: Hostile Makeover – Titmouse, Inc.	The Red Turtle – Studio Ghibli, Wild Bunch, Why Not Productions; Long Way North – Produced by Sacrebleu Productions, Maybe Movies, Norlum Studios, France 3 Cinéma and 2 Minutes; Miss Hokusai – Production I.G; My Life as a Zucchini – Rita Productions, Blue Spirit Productions, Gebeka Films, KNM; Your Name – CoMix Wave Films
Best Student Film
Citipati – Filmakademie Baden-Wuerttemberg; FISHWITCH – Adrienne Dowling; The Abyss – Liying Huang; The Wrong End of the Stick – Terri Matthews; Twiddly Things – Adara Todd

== Individual achievement categories ==
Outstanding Achievement, Animated Effects in an Animated Production	Outstanding Achievement, Animated Effects in a Live Action Production
Marlon West, Erin V. Ramos, Blair Pierpont, Ian J. Coony and John M. Kosnik – Moana – Walt Disney Animation Studios; David Horsley, Eric Wachtman, Timur Khodzhaev, Daniel Leatherdale and Terrance Tomberg – Kubo and the Two Strings – LAIKA; Matt Titus, Jeff Budsberg, Carl Hooper, Louis Flores and Jason Mayer – Kung Fu Panda 3 – DreamWorks Animation; Mouloud Oussid – The Red Turtle – Studio Ghibli, Wild Bunch and Why Not Productions; Thom Wickes, Henrik Fält, Dong Joo Byun, Rattanin Sirinaruemarn and Sam Klock – Zootopia – Walt Disney Animation Studios	Georg Kaltenbrunner, Michael Marcuzzi, Thomas Bevan, Andrew Graham and Jihyun Yoon – Doctor Strange – Mirror Dimension – Marvel Studios; Raul Essig, Mark Chataway, George Kuruvilla and Mihai Cioroba – Deepwater Horizon – The Rig – Lionsgate; Terry Bannon, Nicholas Tripodi, Daniel Fotheringham, Matt Weaver and Julien Boudou – Ghostbusters – Iloura; Claude Schitter, Benjaman Folkman, Gary Boyle, David Caeiro and Luke Millar – The BFG – Amblin Entertainment and Walt Disney Pictures; John Hansen, George Kuruvilla, Alexis Hall, Gordon Chapman and Ben O’Brien – Warcraft – Magic – Legendary/Universal
Outstanding Achievement, Character Animation in an Animated Television/Broadcast Production	Outstanding Achievement, Character Animation in a Feature Production
Mike Chaffe – DreamWorks Trollhunters – Episode: Becoming, Part 1 – DreamWorks Animation Television; Barry Kennedy – Atomic Puppet – Mercury Filmworks, Gaumont Animation and Technicolor; Rob Thomson – The Snowy Day – Amazon Studios and Karrot Entertainment; Dan MacKenzie – Tumble Leaf – Episode: Thinking Outside The Hoop / Fig's Hay- Maze-ing Wander – Amazon Studios and Bix Pix Entertainment; Joe Heinen – Tumble Leaf – Episode: Mighty Mud Movers / Having A Ball – Amazon Studios and Bix Pix Entertainment	Jan Maas – Kubo and the Two Strings – LAIKA; Erick Oh – Finding Dory – Pixar; Ludovic Bouancheau – Kung Fu Panda 3 – DreamWorks Animation; Dave Hardin – Zootopia – Walt Disney Animation Studios; Chad Sellers – Zootopia – Walt Disney Animation Studios
Outstanding Achievement, Character Animation in a Live Action Production	Outstanding Achievement, Character Animation in a Video Game
Andrew R. Jones, Peta Bayley, Gabriele Zucchelli and Benjamin Jones – The Jungle Book – Walt Disney Pictures; Steve Rawlins, Ebrahim Jahromi, Cedric Lo, Stephen King and Yair Gutierrez – Captain America: Civil War – Spider-Man – Marvel Studios; Nicholas Tripodi, Dean Elliott, James Hollingworth and Matt Weaver – Game of Thrones – Battle of the Bastards – Series 6 Episode 9 – HBO; Andrew R. Jones, Paul Story, Dennis Yoo, Eteuati Tema and Andrei Coval – The Jungle Book – Walt Disney Pictures; Hal Hickel, Jee Young Park, Kai-Hua Lan, Cedric Lo and KimHuat Ooi – Warcraft – Orcs – Legendary/Universal	Jeremy Yates, Almudena Soria, Eric Baldwin, Paul Davies, Tom Bland – Uncharted 4: A Thief's End – Naughty Dog; Lucio Mennillo, Martine Quesnel, Alexandre Cheff, Laura Gorrie and Guillaume Charrin – Teenage Mutant Ninja Turtles: Legends – Ludia Inc.; Ranon Sarono, Shawn Wilson, Mark Grigsby, Paul Messerly and Moy Parra – Titanfall 2 – Respawn Entertainment; Sebastian Kalemba – The Witcher 3: Wild Hunt – Expansion Packs – CD Projekt Red
Outstanding Achievement, Character Design in an Animated TV/Broadcast Production	Outstanding Achievement, Character Design in an Animated Feature Production
Victor Maldonado, Alfredo Torres and Jules Rigolle – DreamWorks Trollhunters – Episode: Win, Lose or Draal – DreamWorks Animation Television; Raphaël Chabassol – Counterfeit Cat – Episode: 28 Seconds Later – Tricon Kids & Family and Wildseed Kids; Jennifer Wood – Pig Goat Banana Cricket – Episode: It's Time to Slumber Party – Nickelodeon; Robin Davey – Rain or Shine – Google Spotlight Stories/Nexus Studios; Benjamin Balistreri – Wander Over Yonder – Episode: The Night Out – Disney Television Animation	Cory Loftis – Zootopia – Walt Disney Animation Studios; Shannon Tindle – Kubo and the Two Strings – LAIKA; Bill Schwab and Jin Kim – Moana – Walt Disney Animation Studios; Eric Guillon – The Secret Life of Pets – Illumination Entertainment; Tim Lamb and Craig Kellman – Trolls – DreamWorks Animation
Outstanding Achievement, Directing in an Animated TV/Broadcast Production	Outstanding Achievement, Directing in an Animated Feature Production
Patrick Osborne – Pearl – Google Spotlight Stories/Evil Eye Pictures; Saschka Unseld – A Love Story – Passion Pictures; Kirsten Lepore – Adventure Time – Episode: Bad Jubies – Cartoon Network Studios; David Feiss – Open Season: Scared Silly – Episode: Open Season: Scared Silly – Sony Pictures Animation; Dave Thomas, Eddie Trigueros and Justin Nichols – Wander Over Yonder – Episode: My Fair Hatey – Disney Television Animation	Byron Howard and Rich Moore – Zootopia – Walt Disney Animation Studios; Travis Knight – Kubo and the Two Strings – LAIKA; Claude Barras – My Life as a Zucchini – Rita Productions, Blue Spirit Productions, Gebeka Films and KNM; Michael Dudok de Wit – The Red Turtle – Studio Ghibli, Wild Bunch and Why Not Productions; Makoto Shinkai – Your Name – CoMix Wave Films
Outstanding Achievement, Music in an Animated TV/Broadcast Production	Outstanding Achievement, Music in an Animated Feature Production
Scot Stafford, Alexis Harte and JJ Wiesler – Pearl – Google Spotlight Stories/Evil Eye Pictures; Loren Bouchard and John Dylan Keith – Bob's Burgers – Episode: Glued, Where's My Bob? – Bento Box Entertainment; Christopher Willis – Mickey Mouse – Episode: Dancevidaniya – Disney Television Animation; Alexandre Desplat and Tim Davies – DreamWorks Trollhunters – Episode: Becoming, Part 1 – DreamWorks Animation Television; Kevin Kiner – Star Wars Rebels – Episode: #2–24: Twilight of the Apprentice – Lucasfilm Ltd. / Disney XD	Hans Zimmer, Richard Harvey and Camille – The Little Prince – Netflix and On Animation Studios; Kristopher Carter, Lolita Ritmanis and Michael McCuistion – Batman: Return of the Caped Crusaders – Warner Bros. Animation; Joby Talbot – Sing – Illumination Entertainment; Laurent Perez del Mar – The Red Turtle – Studio Ghibli, Wild Bunch and Why Not Productions; Alexandre Desplat – The Secret Life of Pets – Illumination Entertainment
Outstanding Achievement, Production Design in an Animated TV/Broadcast Production	Outstanding Achievement, Production Design in an Animated Feature Production
Tuna Bora – Pearl – Google Spotlight Stories/Evil Eye Pictures; Jason Kolowski – Adventure Time – Episode: Bad Jubies – Bix Pix Entertainment, Cartoon Network and Frederator Studios; Lily Bernard – Puffin Rock – Episode: The First Snow – Cartoon Saloon, Dog Ears and Penguin – Netflix; Robin Davey – Rain or Shine – Google Spotlight Stories/Nexus Studios; Kevin Dart, Sylvia Liu, Chris Turnham and Eastwood Wong – The Mr. Peabody & Sherman Show – Episode: The Wrath of Hughes – DreamWorks Animation Television	Nelson Lowry, Trevor Dalmer, August Hall and Ean McNamara – Kubo and the Two Strings – LAIKA; Raymond Zibach and Max Boas – Kung Fu Panda 3 – DreamWorks Animation; Lou Romano, Alexander Juhasz and Celine Desrumaux – The Little Prince – Netflix and On Animation Studio; Kendal Cronkhite and Tim Lamb – Trolls – DreamWorks Animation; David Goetz and Matthias Lechner – Zootopia – Walt Disney Animation Studios
Outstanding Achievement, Storyboarding in an Animated TV/Broadcast Production	Outstanding Achievement, Storyboarding in an Animated Feature Production
Hyunjoo Song – DreamWorks Trollhunters – Episode: Win, Lose or Draal – DreamWorks Animation Television; Kyle Marshall – Atomic Puppet – Episode: Sick Day – Mercury Filmworks, Gaumont Animation and Technicolor; Heiko Von Drengenberg – Mickey Mouse – Episode: Road Hogs – Disney Television Animation; Dan Povenmire and Kyle Menke – Milo Murphy's Law – Episode: Going the Extra Milo – Disney Television Animation; Ben Juwono – The Adventures of Puss in Boots – Episode: Prey Time – DreamWorks Animation Television	Dean Wellins – Zootopia – Walt Disney Animation Studios; Trevor Jimenez – Finding Dory – Pixar; Mark Garcia – Kubo and the Two Strings – LAIKA; Normand Lemay – Moana – Walt Disney Animation Studios; Claire Morrissey – Trolls – DreamWorks Animation
Outstanding Achievement, Voice Acting in an Animated TV/Broadcast Production	Outstanding Achievement, Voice Acting in an Animated Feature Production
Carlos Alazraqui as the voice of Ponce de León – The Mr. Peabody & Sherman Show – Episode: Ponce de León – DreamWorks Animation Television; Alison Brie as the voice of Diane Nguyen – BoJack Horseman – Episode: Multiple Episodes – Tornante Productions, LLC for Netflix; Will Townsend as the voice of Mr. Weenie – Open Season: Scared Silly – Episode: Open Season: Scared Silly – Sony Pictures Animation; Leslie Carrara-Rudolph as the voice of Bubbles – Splash and Bubbles – Episode: #102 "I Only Have Eyespots for You/Double Bubbles" – The Jim Henson Company and Herschend Studios; Lars Mikkelsen as the voice of Grand Admiral Thrawn – Star Wars Rebels – Episode: #3-05: "Hera's Heroes" – Lucasfilm Ltd. / Disney XD	Auliʻi Cravalho as the voice of Moana – Moana – Walt Disney Animation Studios; Jason Bateman as the voice of Nick Wilde – Zootopia – Walt Disney Animation Studios; Art Parkinson as the voice of Kubo – Kubo and the Two Strings – LAIKA; Katie Crown as the voice of Tulip – Storks – Warner Animation Group; Zooey Deschanel as the voice of Bridget – Trolls – DreamWorks Animation
Outstanding Achievement, Writing in an Animated TV/Broadcast Production	Outstanding Achievement, Writing in an Animated Feature Production
Lizzie Molyneux and Wendy Molyneux – Bob's Burgers – Episode: The Hormone-iums – Bento Box Entertainment; Shion Takeuchi, Mark Rizzo, Jeff Rowe, Josh Weinstein and Alex Hirsch – Gravity Falls – Episode: Weirdmageddon 3: Take Back The Falls – Disney TV Animation; Davey Moore – Puffin Rock – The First Snow – Episode: 59 "Cartoon Saloon" – Dog Ears and Penguin Random House; Dan Greaney – The Simpsons – Episode: Barthood – Gracie Films in Association with 20th Century Fox Television; Rob LaZebnik – The Simpsons – Episode: The Burns Cage – Gracie Films in Association with 20th Century Fox Television	Jared Bush and Phil Johnston – Zootopia – Walt Disney Animation Studios; Marc Haimes and Chris Butler – Kubo and the Two Strings – LAIKA; Céline Sciamma – My Life as a Zucchini – Rita Productions, Blue Spirit Productions, Gebeka Films and KNM; Michaël Dudok de Wit and Pascale Ferran – The Red Turtle – Studio Ghibli, Wild Bunch and Why Not Productions
Outstanding Achievement, Editorial in an Animated TV/Broadcast Production	Outstanding Achievement, Editorial in an Animated Feature Production
Illya Owens – Disney Mickey Mouse – Episode: Sock Burglar – Disney Television Animation; David Craig and Jeff Adams – All Hail King Julien – Episode: King Julien Superstar! – DreamWorks Animation Television; Mark Seymour, Chuck Smith and Eric Davidson – Bob's Burgers – Episode: Sea Me Now – Bento Box Entertainment; Kevin Locarro, Andrew Sorcini, Nancy Frazen and Tony Mizgalski – Gravity Falls – Episode: Weirdmageddon 3: Take Back The Falls – Disney Television Animation; Joe E. Elwood and Alex McDonnell – Star Wars Rebels – Episode: #2–24: "Twilight of the Apprentice" – Lucasfilm Ltd. / Disney XD	Christopher Murrie – Kubo and the Two Strings – LAIKA; Nazim Meslem – April and the Extraordinary World – Je Suis Bien Content and Studiocanal; Jeff Draheim – Moana – Walt Disney Animation Studios; Kevin Pavlovic – Sausage Party – Columbia Pictures and Annapurna Pictures; Fabienne Rawley and Jeremy Milton – Zootopia – Walt Disney Animation Studios

== Juried awards ==
Winsor McCay Award
Dale Baer, Caroline Leaf and Mamoru Oshii
for their career contributions to the art of animation
June Foray Award
Bill & Sue Kroyer
for his significant and benevolent or charitable impact on the art and industry of animation
Ub Iwerks Award
Google Spotlight's Virtual Reality Platform
for technical advancement in the art of animation
Special Achievement Award
Life, Animated
Certificate of Merit
Leslie Ezeh and Gary Perkovac

== Multiple awards and nominations ==
=== Films ===
The following films received multiple nominations:

Nominations	Film
11	Zootopia
10	Kubo and the Two Strings
6	Moana
5	The Red Turtle
4	Kung Fu Panda 3
4	Trolls
4	Pearl
3	Finding Dory
3	My Life as a Zucchini
2	Your Name
2	The Jungle Book
2	The Little Prince

The following films received multiple awards:

Wins	Film
6	Zootopia
3	Kubo and the Two Strings
3	Pearl
2	Moana

=== Television/Broadcast ===
The following television productions received multiple nominations:

Nominations	Film
4	Trollhunters
3	Bob's Burgers
3	Puffin Rock
3	Tumble Leaf
3	Adventure Time
3	Wander Over Yonder
3	The Simpsons
3	Star Wars Rebels
3	Mickey Mouse
2	Gravity Falls
2	BoJack Horseman
2	Atomic Puppet
2	Rain or Shine
2	Open Season: Scared Silly
2	The Mr. Peabody & Sherman Show

The following television productions received multiple awards:

Wins	Film
3	Trollhunters
2	Bob's Burgers
