= Pearl (2016 film) =

- Film poster
- Directed by: Patrick Osborne
- Starring: Nicki Bluhm; Kelley Stoltz; Emma Grace Eisenmann
- Production company: Google Spotlight Stories
- Release date: April 17, 2016
- Running time: 6 minutes
- Country: United States
- Language: English

Pearl is an American 2016 independent animated drama short film directed by Patrick Osborne. In 2017, it became the first VR film to be nominated for an Academy Award.

== Plot ==
Pearl is the story of a girl and her dad as they cross the United States in an older model hatchback chasing their dreams. The music created by the father and daughter is the central narrator and the single perspective is viewed from the front passenger seat of the car, from where the viewer has a 360 degree view of all the action.

== Accolades ==
Award	Date of ceremony	Category	Recipient(s)	Result	Ref(s)
Academy Awards	February 26, 2017	Best Animated Short Film	Patrick Osborne	Nominated	
Annie Awards	February 4, 2017	Best Animated Short Subject	Pearl	Nominated	
Annie Awards	February 4, 2017	Outstanding Achievement, Directing in an Animated TV/Broadcast Production	Patrick Osborne	Won	
Annie Awards	February 4, 2017	Outstanding Achievement, Music in an Animated TV/Broadcast Production	Scot Stafford, Alexis Harte and JJ Wiesler	Won	
Annie Awards	February 4, 2017	Outstanding Achievement, Production Design in an Animated TV/Broadcast Production	Tuna Bora	Won	
Peabody Awards	May 19, 2017	Futures of Media	Pearl	Won	
Emmy Awards	September 9, 2017	Innovation in Interactive Programming	Patrick Osborne, David Eisenmann, Karen Dufilho, Google Spotlight Stories, Evil Eye Pictures	Won	
