= Robert Valley =

Canadian animator and artist

Robert Valley is a Canadian animator and visual graphic artist. He is best known for his work on Tron: Uprising (2012), Pear Cider and Cigarettes (2016), and Love, Death & Robots (2019). His accolades includes 3 Primetime Emmy Awards, an Annie Award, with an Academy Award nomination.

He has a distinct visual style that is influenced by Peter Chung and Gorillaz creator Jamie Hewlett.

Valley was born in Vancouver, British Columbia in 1969. After completing a four-year animation program in Vancouver, he moved to San Francisco in 1992.

== Career ==
Valley began by directing animated commercials. In 1997 he started his own company, Maverix Studios located in San Francisco. He returned to freelance in 2000 and worked in the UK, France, Spain, New Zealand, and Korea. He now lives in Vancouver, British Columbia. He is most famous for his work with the band Gorillaz.

An early break was his work on Æon Flux. He also did the character designs for Disney's Tron: Uprising and Motorcity. He has also worked on The Beatles: Rock Band, Firebreather, and DC Comics Wonder Woman clips. He provided animated sequences for the 2020 documentary Belushi.

He received an Academy Award nomination for his work on Pear Cider and Cigarettes and has directed three episodes for the animated Netflix series Love, Death & Robots.

== Filmography ==
- "Ether Drift Theory" (eighth episode of Æon Flux) (1995)
- The Chronicles of Riddick: Dark Fury (2004)
- Dance Central (Opening and ending cinematic, co-directed with Dan Sumich) (2010)
- Motorcity (2012)
- Tron: Uprising (2012)
- Wonder Woman (2013)
- Pear Cider and Cigarettes (2016)
- The Hollow (2018–2020)
- "Zima Blue" (fourteenth episode of Love, Death & Robots, volume one) (2019)
- "Ice" (second episode of Love, Death & Robots, volume two) (2021)
- "It's About Time" (pilot episode of Invincible) (2021)
- "Metamorphosis" (lore trailer for Apex Legends' tenth season, Emergence) (2021)
- Agent Elvis (2023)
- "400 Boys" (fourth episode of Love, Death & Robots, volume four) (2025)

== Awards ==
- Nominated: Academy Award for Best Animated Short Film - Pear Cider and Cigarettes (2017)
- Won: Primetime Emmy Award for Outstanding Short Form Animated Program - Love, Death & Robots - for Episode "Ice" (2021)
- Won 2×: Primetime Emmy Award for Outstanding Individual Achievement in Animation Love, Death & Robots - for Two Episodes "Ice" (2021) and "400 Boys" (2025)
- Nominated: Annie Award for Outstanding Achievement for Production Design in an Animated Television/Media Production - Love, Death & Robots - for Episode "Ice" (2022)
- Nominated: Annie Award for Storyboarding in an Animated Television or Other Broadcast Venue Production - Tron Uprising - for Episode "The Reward" (2013)
- Won: Annie Award for Character Design in an Animated Television or Other Broadcast Venue Production - Tron Uprising - for Episode "The Renegade: Part 1" (2013)
