= Tuna Bora =

Concept and visual development artist

- Born: Istanbul, Turkey
- Occupation: Artist
- Website: http://tunabora.com/

Tuna Bora is a concept and visual development artist. She was born in Istanbul, Turkey but is now based in Los Angeles, United States. Bora uses her skills in the production of animations, video games, commercials and other things. She has worked with well-known brands such as Sony, Google, Toyota, Nike, Netflix and Disney. She created and directed the augmented reality experience ‘Little Red the Inventor’ for the Within's Wonderscope app.

She won a 2017 Annie Award for Outstanding Achievement in Production Design in an Animated TV/Broadcast Production for her work on the short film Pearl.

== Selected filmography ==
- Pearl (2016)
