= Annie Award for Outstanding Achievement for Character Animation in a Feature Production =

Film award category

Annie Award for Character Animation in a Feature Production
- Awarded for: Excellence in film animation
- Country: United States
- Presented by: ASIFA-Hollywood
- First award: 1991
- Currently held by: Ryusuke Furuya – KPop Demon Hunters (2025)
- Website: http://annieawards.org

The Annie Award for Character Animation in an Animated Feature Production is an Annie Award awarded annually to the best character animator and introduced in 1995. It rewards animation of characters for animated feature films.

Up until the creation of both the Annie Award for Character Animation in a TV Production and Live Action Production categories, live-action films, TV series, animated shorts, and non-theatrical releases were eligible for nomination in this category.

== Winners and nominees ==
‡= special award
*= non-feature nominee
†=live-action nominee

=== 1990s ===
Best Individual Achievement for Artistic Excellence in the Field of Animation

Year	Recipient(s)	Film
1994 (22nd)
1994 (22nd)	Deane Taylor (art director)	The Nightmare Before Christmas
1994 (22nd)	Andy Gaskill (art director)	The Lion King
1994 (22nd)	Mark Henn (supervising animator)	The Lion King
1994 (22nd)	Scott F. Johnston (artistic supervisor)	The Lion King
1994 (22nd)	Paul Rudish (art director)	Super Secret Squirrel

Best Individual Achievement for Animation

Year	Animator	Notes	Film
1995 (23rd)
1995 (23rd)	Nik Ranieri	Supervising Animator: Meeko	Pocahontas
1995 (23rd)	Dominique Monféry	Animation Supervisor	A Goofy Movie
1995 (23rd)	Chris Buck	Supervising Animator: Grandmother Willow, Percy, and Wiggins	Pocahontas
1995 (23rd)	David Pruiksma	Supervising Animator: Flit	Pocahontas
1995 (23rd)	Cynthia Wells	Animator	Interview with Tallulah, Queen of the Universe
1996 (24th)
1996 (24th)	Pete Docter	Supervising Animator	Toy Story
1996 (24th)	Rob Coleman		Dragonheart
1996 (24th)	James Baxter	Supervising Animator: Quasimodo	The Hunchback of Notre Dame
1996 (24th)	Russ Edmonds	Supervising Animator: Captain Phoebus	The Hunchback of Notre Dame
1996 (24th)	Kathy Zielinski	Supervising Animator: Judge Claude Frollo	The Hunchback of Notre Dame

Best Individual Achievement for Character Animation

Year	Animator	Notes	Film
1997 (25th)
1997 (25th)	Nik Ranieri	Supervising Animator: Hades	Hercules
1997 (25th)	Frans Vischer	Supervising Animator: Darla Dimple and Max	Cats Don't Dance
1997 (25th)	Ken Duncan	Supervising Animator: Meg	Hercules
1997 (25th)	Bob Baxter*	Episode: "Beethoven's Whiff"	Timon & Pumbaa *
1998 (26th)
1998 (26th)	Ruben Aquino	Supervising Animator: Captain Li Shang	Mulan
1998 (26th)	T. Woody Yokum	Animator	Genie's Great Minds*
1998 (26th)	Tom Bancroft	Supervising Animator: "Mushu"	Mulan
1998 (26th)	Mark Henn	Supervising Animator: "Fa Mulan"	Mulan
1999 (27th)
1999 (27th)	Steve Markowski	Supervising Animator	The Iron Giant
1999 (27th)	Ken Duncan	Supervising Animator: Jane Porter	Tarzan
1999 (27th)	Glen Keane	Supervising Animator: Tarzan	Tarzan
1999 (27th)	Jim Van der Keyl	Animator	The Iron Giant
1999 (27th)	Dean Wellins	Supervising Animator	The Iron Giant

=== 2000s ===
Year	Animator	Notes	Film
2000 (28th)
2000 (28th)	Eric Goldberg	Lead Animator: Carnival of the Animals Segment	Fantasia 2000
2000 (28th)	David Brewster	Supervising Animator: Miguel	The Road to El Dorado
2000 (28th)	Rodolphe Guenoden	Supervising Animator: Chel	The Road to El Dorado
2000 (28th)	Sean P. Mullen†	Character VFX Animator	Stuart Little
2000 (28th)	Doug Sweetland	Animator	Toy Story 2
2001 (29th)
2001 (29th)	Dale Baer	Supervising Animator: Yzma	The Emperor's New Groove
2001 (29th)	Paul Chung	Animator	Shrek
2001 (29th)	Raman Hui	Animator	Shrek
2001 (29th)	Jason Reisig	Animator	Shrek
2001 (29th)	Dean Wellins	Supervising Animator: Thrax	Osmosis Jones
2002 (30th)
2002 (30th)	Doug Sweetland	Directing Animator	Monsters, Inc.
2002 (30th)	Mike Thurmeier	Lead Animator	Ice Age
2002 (30th)	Alex Kuperschmidt	Supervising Animator: Stitch	Lilo and Stitch
2002 (30th)	John Kahrs	Animator: James P. "Sulley" Sullivan	Monsters, Inc.
2002 (30th)	Sergio Pablos	Supervising Animator: Dr. Delbert Doppler	Treasure Planet
2003 (31st)
2003 (31st)	Doug Sweetland	Animator	Finding Nemo
2003 (31st)	Byron Howard	Supervising Animator: Kenai-Bear	Brother Bear
2003 (31st)	Dave Devan	Animator	Finding Nemo
2003 (31st)	Gini Santos	Animator	Finding Nemo
2003 (31st)	Anthony DeRosa	Lead Animator	Looney Tunes: Back in Action
2004 (32nd)
2004 (32nd)	Angus MacLane	Animator	The Incredibles
2004 (32nd)	Ken Duncan	Supervising Animator	Shark Tale
2004 (32nd)	John Kahrs	Animator	The Incredibles
2004 (32nd)	Peter Sohn	Animator	The Incredibles
2004 (32nd)	Kureha Yokoo	Animator	The Incredibles
2005 (33rd)
2005 (33rd)	Claire Billet	Key Animator	Wallace and Gromit: The Curse of the Were-Rabbit
2005 (33rd)	Matt Shumway†	VFX Animator	The Chronicles of Narnia: The Lion, the Witch and the Wardrobe
2005 (33rd)	Spike Brandt *	Animator	The Karate Guard
2005 (33rd)	Jay Grace	Key Animator	Wallace and Gromit: The Curse of the Were-Rabbit
2005 (33rd)	Christopher Sadler	Key Animator	Wallace and Gromit: The Curse of the Were-Rabbit
2006 (34th)
2006 (34th)	Gabe Hordos	Animator	Flushed Away
2006 (34th)	Carlos Baena	Animator	Cars
2006 (34th)	Bobby Podesta	Directing Animator	Cars
2006 (34th)	Line Anderson	Animator	Flushed Away
2006 (34th)	Kristof Serrand	Supervising Animator	Over the Hedge
2007 (35th)
2007 (35th)	Michal Makarewicz	Animator	Ratatouille
2007 (35th)	Dave Hardin	Animator	Surf's Up
2007 (35th)	Alan Hawkins	Animator	Surf's Up
2008 (36th)
2008 (36th)	James Baxter	Animation Supervisor: Po's Dream Sequence	Kung Fu Panda
2008 (36th)	Jeff Gabor	Lead Animator: Councilmen of Whoville	Horton Hears a Who!
2008 (36th)	Phillippe Le Brun	Supervising Animator	Kung Fu Panda
2008 (36th)	Dan Wagner	Head of Character Animation	Kung Fu Panda
2008 (36th)	Victor Navone	Animator	WALL-E
2009 (37th)
2009 (37th)	Eric Goldberg	Supervising Animator: Louis the Alligator and "Almost There" Fantasy Sequence	The Princess and the Frog
2009 (37th)	Travis Knight	Lead Animator	Coraline
2009 (37th)	Andreas Deja	Supervising Animator "Mama Odie"	The Princess and the Frog
2009 (37th)	Bruce W. Smith	Supervising Animator "Dr. Facilier"	The Princess and the Frog
2009 (37th)	Daniel Nguyen	Animator	Up

=== 2010s ===
Year	Animator	Notes	Film
2010 (38th)
2010 (38th)	Gabe Hordos	Supervising Animator: Toothless	How to Train Your Dragon
2010 (38th)	Mark Donald	Supervising Animator	Megamind
2010 (38th)	Anthony Hodgson	Supervising Animator	Megamind
2010 (38th)	Jakob Njort Jensen	Supervising Animator	How to Train Your Dragon
2010 (38th)	David Torres	Supervising Animator: Hiccup	How to Train Your Dragon
2011 (39th)
2011 (39th)	Jeff Gabor	Lead Animator	Rio
2011 (39th)	Pierre Perifel	Lead Animator: Lord Shen	Kung Fu Panda 2
2011 (39th)	Dan Wagner	Head of Character Animation	Kung Fu Panda 2
2011 (39th)	Olivier Staphylas	Supervising Animator	Puss in Boots
2011 (39th)	Patrik Puhala	Lead Animator	Rio
2011 (39th)	Andreas Deja	Supervising Animator: Tigger	Winnie the Pooh
2011 (39th)	Mark Henn	Supervising Animator: Winnie the Pooh and Christopher Robin	Winnie the Pooh
2012 (40th)
2012 (40th)	Travis Knight	Lead Animator	ParaNorman
2012 (40th)	Travis Hathaway	Animator	Brave
2012 (40th)	Daniel Nguyen	Animator	Brave
2012 (40th)	Jaime Landes Roe	Animator	Brave
2012 (40th)	Will Becher	Character Lead Animator	The Pirates! In an Adventure with Scientists!
2012 (40th)	Phillippe Le Brun	Lead Character Animator: Bunny	Rise of the Guardians
2012 (40th)	David Pate	Lead Character Animator: Jack	Rise of the Guardians
2012 (40th)	Pierre Perifel	Lead Character Animator: North	Rise of the Guardians
2013 (41st)
2013 (41st)	Jakob Njort Jensen	Lead Animator: Guy	The Croods
2013 (41st)	Jonathan du Vai	Animator	Despicable Me 2
2013 (41st)	Thom Roberts	Animator	Epic
2013 (41st)	Patrick Imbert	Animator	Ernest & Celestine
2013 (41st)	Tony Smeed	Animation Supervisor: Queen Elsa	Frozen
2013 (41st)	Kitarô Kôsaka	Animator	The Wind Rises
2014 (42nd)
2014 (42nd)	Fabio Lignini	Supervising Animator	How to Train Your Dragon 2
2014 (42nd)	Travis Knight	Lead Animator	The Boxtrolls
2014 (42nd)	Michael Lamont	Lead Animator	The Boxtrolls
2014 (42nd)	Jason Stalman	Animator	The Boxtrolls
2014 (42nd)	Thomas Grummt	Lead Animator	How to Train Your Dragon 2
2014 (42nd)	Steven Hornby	Supervising Animator	How to Train Your Dragon 2
2014 (42nd)	Ravi Kamble Govind	Lead Animator	Penguins of Madagascar
2015 (43rd)
2015 (43rd)	Allison Rutland	Animator	Inside Out
2015 (43rd)	Mark C. Harris	Animator	The Good Dinosaur
2015 (43rd)	K.C Roeyer	Animator	The Good Dinosaur
2015 (43rd)	Mark Donald	Animator	Home
2015 (43rd)	Travis Hathaway	Animator	Inside Out
2015 (43rd)	Hichem Arfaoui	Animation Supervisor: Herb, Scarlet Overkill, Kevin, Stuart", and Bob.	Minions
2015 (43rd)	B. J. Crawford	Animator	The Peanuts Movie
2016 (44th)
2016 (44th)	Jan-Erik Maas	Animator	Kubo and the Two Strings
2016 (44th)	Erick Oh	Animator: Hank and Dory	Finding Dory
2016 (44th)	Ludovic Bouancheau	Animator	Kung Fu Panda 3
2016 (44th)	Dave Hardin	Animator: Judy Hopps, Stu & Bonnie Hopps, Chief Bogo, Nick Wilde	Zootopia
2016 (44th)	Chad Sellers	Animator: Mr. Big, Koslov, Judy Hopps, Nick Wilde, Flash	Zootopia
2017 (45th)
2017 (45th)	John Chun Chiu Lee	Animator: Miguel, Ernesto de la Cruz, Hector, Dante, Mama Coco	Coco
2017 (45th)	Marco Nguyen, Benjamin Renner, and Patrick Imbert	Animator	The Big Bad Fox and Other Tales...
2017 (45th)	Bryce McGovern	Animation Supervisor	The Boss Baby
2017 (45th)	Rani Naamani	Animation Supervisor: Boss Baby	The Boss Baby
2017 (45th)	Allison Rutland	Animator	Coco
2018 (46th)
2018 (46th)	David Han	Animator	Spider-Man: Into the Spider-Verse
2018 (46th)	Laurie Sitzia	Lead Animator: Goona, Dug, Chief Bobnar, the Tribe, the rabbit and Lord Nooth	Early Man
2018 (46th)	Lance Fite	Animator	Incredibles 2
2018 (46th)	Jason Stalman	Lead Animator: Chief and Nutmeg	Isle of Dogs
2018 (46th)	Vitor Vilela	Animator: Wreck-It Ralph, Fix-It Felix, Double Dan, Vanellope Von Schweetz, Ralphzilla, Yesss, Root Beer Tapper Patrons, Pancake Bunny, Milkshake Kitty, Baby Mo, Mo's Mom	Ralph Breaks the Internet
2019 (47th)
2019 (47th)	Sergio Martins	Animation Supervisor: Alva	Klaus
2019 (47th)	Andrew Ford	Animator	Frozen 2
2019 (47th)	Dane Stogner	Supervising Animator: Toothless	How to Train Your Dragon: The Hidden World
2019 (47th)	Rani Naamani	Supervising Animator	How to Train Your Dragon: The Hidden World
2019 (47th)	Rachelle Lambden	Animator	Missing Link

=== 2020s ===
Year	Animator	Notes	Film
2020 (48th)
2020 (48th)	Michal Makarewicz	Animator	Soul
2020 (48th)	Shaun Chacko	Animator	Onward
2020 (48th)	Rani Naamani	Supervising Animator	The Croods: A New Age
2020 (48th)	Andrés Bedate Martin	Animator	The Willoughbys
2020 (48th)	Emmanuel Asquier-Brassart	Animator	Wolfwalkers
2021 (49th)	Dave Hardin	Animator	Encanto
2021 (49th)	Tarun Lak	Animator	Luca
2021 (49th)	Jennifer Hager	Animation Supervisor	Raya and the Last Dragon
2021 (49th)	Ravi Kamble Govind	Supervising Animator	The Boss Baby: Family Business
2021 (49th)	Ketan Shankar Adikhari	Animator	Wish Dragon
2022 (50th)
2022 (50th)	Tucker Barrie	Animator	Guillermo del Toro's Pinocchio
2022 (50th)	Teresa Falcone	Animator	Turning Red
2022 (50th)	Eric Anderson	Animator	Turning Red
2022 (50th)	Jorge A. Capote	Lead Animator	The Bad Guys
2022 (50th)	Min Hong	Animator	The Bad Guys
2023 (51st)
2023 (51st)	Takeshi Honda	Animation Director	The Boy and the Heron
2023 (51st)	Jessica Torres	Animator	Elemental
2023 (51st)	Toby Seale	Animator	Nimona
2023 (51st)	Prashanth Cavale	Lead Animator	Ruby Gillman, Teenage Kraken
2023 (51st)	Kenichi Tsuchiya	Supervising Animator	Suzume
2024 (52nd)
2024 (52nd)	Fabio Lignini		The Wild Robot
2024 (52nd)	Aviv Mano		Inside Out 2
2024 (52nd)	Patrick Guisiano		Kung Fu Panda 4
2024 (52nd)	Brian Scott		Moana 2
2024 (52nd)	Carmen Bromfield Mason		Wallace & Gromit: Vengeance Most Fowl
2025 (53rd)
2025 (53rd)	Ryusuke Furuya		KPop Demon Hunters
2025 (53rd)	Jonah Sidhom		Elio
2025 (53rd)	Juliette Laurent		Little Amélie or the Character of Rain
2025 (53rd)	Ludovic Bouancheau		The Bad Guys 2
2025 (53rd)	Tony Smeed		Zootopia 2
