= 23rd Annie Awards =

US media awards ceremony held in 1995

23rd
Annie Awards

November 11, 1995

Best Feature Film:
Pocahontas

Best Television Program:
The Simpsons

Best Video Production:
The Gate to the Mind's Eye

Best Short Subject:
Dexter's Laboratory

The 23rd Annie Awards were given by the International Animated Film Association to honor outstanding achievements in animation in 1995. Pocahontas led the nominations with 7 and won 4 awards, including Best Animated Feature. The Simpsons won its fourth consecutive award for Best Animated Television Program.

The June Foray Award is first given this year. The award is given to individuals who have made significant and benevolent or charitable impact on the art and industry of animation. The award was first given to the lady herself, June Foray.

== Production categories ==
There were six competitive production categories in the 23rd Annie Awards. Outstanding achievements in animated interactive production and in animated promotional production were categories added during that year.

Winners are listed first, highlighted in boldface, and indicated with a double dagger (‡).

**Best Animated Feature**: **Pocahontas – Walt Disney Feature Animation**‡; A Goofy Movie – Walt Disney Television Animation; The Swan Princess – Rich Entertainment	**Best Animated Television Program**: **The Simpsons – Gracie Films, Film Roman**‡; Batman: The Animated Series – Warner Bros. Television Animation; Steven Spielberg Presents Animaniacs – Warner Bros. Television Animation; The Maxx – MTV Animation, Rough Draft Studios; The Tick – Sunbow Productions, Graz Entertainment
**Best Animated Video Production**: **The Gate to the Mind's Eye – Miramar**‡; Opéra imaginaire – Miramar; The Land Before Time II – Universal Cartoon Studios; Macross Plus, Volume One – Big West, Macross Plus Project, Hero Co., Ltd.; Macross Plus, Volume Two – Big West, Macross Plus Project, Hero Co., Ltd.	**Best Animated Short Subject**: **Dexter's Laboratory – Hanna-Barbera**‡; Driving Mr. Pink – MGM Animation; George and Junior’s Christmas Spectacular! – Hanna-Barbera; Interview with Tallulah, Queen of the Universe – Queen of the Universe Productions; Johnny Bravo – Hanna-Barbera
**Best Animated Interactive Production**: **Cadillacs and Dinosaurs – Duck Soup Productions**‡; Crayon Factory – Sidewalk Studio; Full Throttle – LucasArts Entertainment Co.; The Adventures of Hyperman – IBM Illumina Productions, Inc. and Bull Dolphin, Inc., MGM Animation; KIA Interactive – Digital Evolution	**Best Animated Promotional Production**: **Wile E. Coyote – Helicopter – Eveready Batteries, Warner Bros. Animation**‡; John Dough – Citibank, Optimus, Inc.; Canary Boom – Felix the Cat, Film Roman; Chicago Blues – Shell Oil, R/Greenberg Associates; Unforgettable Classics – The Simpsons, Film Roman, Fox

== Outstanding individual achievement ==
Outstanding achievement in production design, storyboarding and character animation were added, totaling seven competitive categories in individual achievements in that year.

Best Achievement in Creative Supervision: Ben Edlund (co-producer) – The Tick‡; John Eng (director) – Duckman; Al Jean and Mike Reisee (executive directors) – The Critic; Frank Paur and Greg Weisman (producers) – Gargoyles; Gregg Vanzo (supervising director) – The Maxx	Best Achievement in Production Design: Michael Giaimo (art director) – Pocahontas‡; Rasoul Azadani (layout artistic supervisor) – Pocahontas; Adrian Penn (art director) – Weiss Energy Hall: The Origin of Energy; Kazuyoshi Takeuchi (production designer) – Gargoyles; Fred Warter (production designer) – A Goofy Movie
Best Achievement in Storyboarding: Kazuo Terada (story artist) – Gargoyles‡; Warwick Gilbert (story artist) – Disney's Aladdin for the episode "The Lost One"; Denise Koyama (story artist) – Disney's Aladdin for the episode "The Secret of Dagger Rock"; Brian Pimental (story artist) – A Goofy Movie; Genndy Tartakovsky (story artist) – Dexter's Laboratory	Best Achievement in Music: Alan Menken (composer) and Stephen Schwartz (lyricist) – Pocahontas‡; Phillip Appleby (composer) and Theodor Geisel (lyricist, posthumous nomination) – Dr. Seuss' Daisy-Head Mayzie; Partick DeRemer and Roy Freeland (songwriters) – A Goofy Movie for the songs "I2I" and "Stand Out"; Richard Stone (supervising composer) – Animaniacs; Shirley Walker (supervising composer) – Batman: The Animated Series
Best Achievement in Voice Acting: Nancy Cartwright as Bart Simpson – The Simpsons‡; Jeff Bennett as Johnny Bravo – Johnny Bravo; Jim Cummings as Mr. Bump and other various characters – Bump in the Night; Tress MacNeille as Dot Warner – Animaniacs; Rob Paulsen as Yakko Warner – Animaniacs	Best Individual Achievement in Animation: Nik Ranieri (supervising animator - Meeko) – Pocahontas‡; Chris Buck (supervising animator - Grandmother Willow – Pocahontas; Dominique Monfrey (animation supervisor) – A Goofy Movie; David Pruiksma (supervising animator - Flit) – Pocahontas; Cynthia Wells (animator) – Interview with Tallulah, Queen of the Universe
Best Achievement in Writing: Ben Edlund and Richard Liebmann-Smith – The Tick for the episode "The Tick vs. Arthur’s Bank Account"‡; Peter Gaffney, Paul Germain, Jon Greenberg and Rachael Lipman – Rugrats for the episode "A Rugrats Passover"; Doug Langdale – Disney's Aladdin for the episode "Do the Rat Thing"; Michael Reaves – Gargoyles for the episode "Deadly Force"; John Semper – Spider-Man for the episode "Day of the Chameleon"

== Juried awards ==
Winsor McCay Award
Recognition for career contributions to the art of animation

- Jules Engel
- Vance Gerry
- Dan McLaughlin

June Foray Award
Recognition of benevolent/charitable impact on the art and industry of animation

- June Foray

Certificate of Merit
Recognition for service to the art, craft and industry of animation

- King Features
- Sarah Baisley
- Dave Brain
- Gary Lah
- Amanda Haas
- Ginny Swift

== Multiple wins and nominations ==
The following twelve productions received multiple nominations:

Nominations	Production
7	Pocahontas
5	A Goofy Movie
4	Animaniacs
4	Gargoyles
3	The Simpsons
3	The Tick
3	Disney's Aladdin
2	Batman: The Animated Series
2	Dexter's Laboratory
2	Interview with Tallulah, Queen of the Universe
2	Johnny Bravo

The following three productions received multiple awards:

Awards	Production
4	Pocahontas
2	The Simpsons
2	The Tick
