= Rock Lobster (disambiguation) =

"Rock Lobster" is a song by The B-52's.

Rock Lobster may also refer to:

- Jasus edwardsii, the southern rock lobster, red rock lobster, or spiny rock lobster
  - Other spiny lobsters of the family Palinuridae, known as rock lobsters
- Athens Rock Lobsters, the professional ice hockey team of Athens, Georgia
- "Rock Lobsters", an episode of Hi Hi Puffy AmiYumi
- Amiga 500, a computer codenamed "Rock Lobster"
