= David Brewster (painter) =

American painter (born 1960)

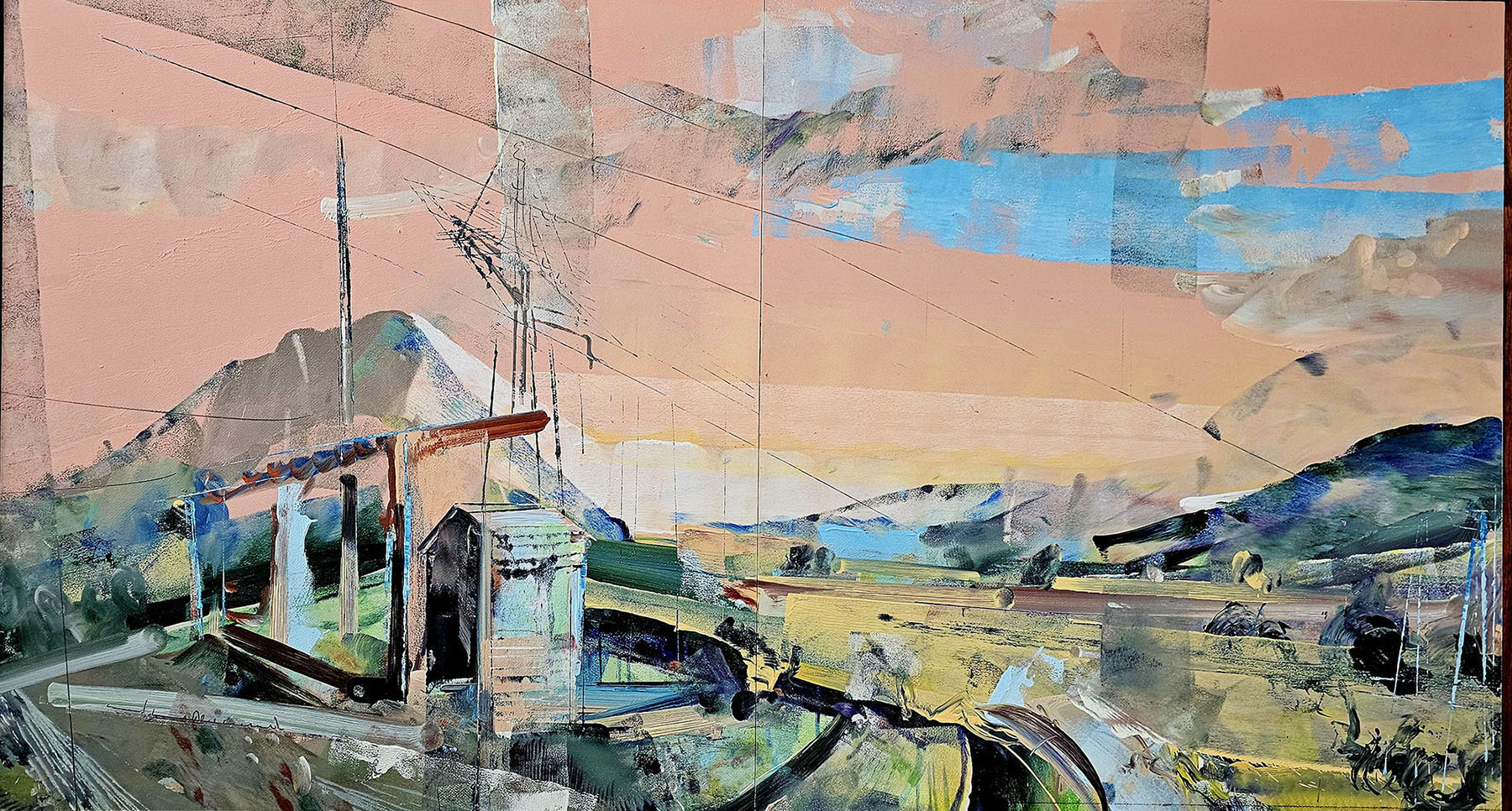
"Colorado River Basin in Crisis" by David Brewster, 42 x 64 inches, Oil on Mi-Teintes, 2015

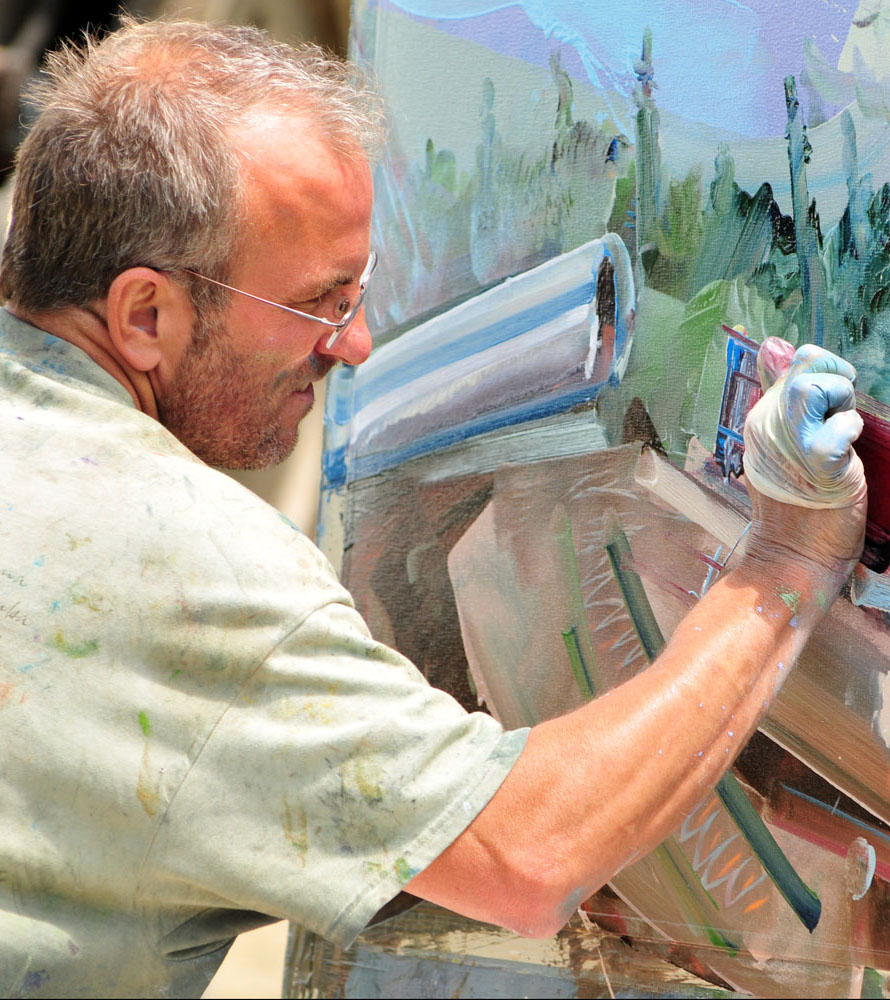
Painter David Brewster creating work for the Art of Action project in 2009. Photo by Jeb Wallace-Brodeur

"Bethlehem Iron Company: Steam Powered Drop Hammer, Largest Forging Device in the World, 1891" by David Brewster, 35 x 70 inches, Oil on Gatorboard, 2012

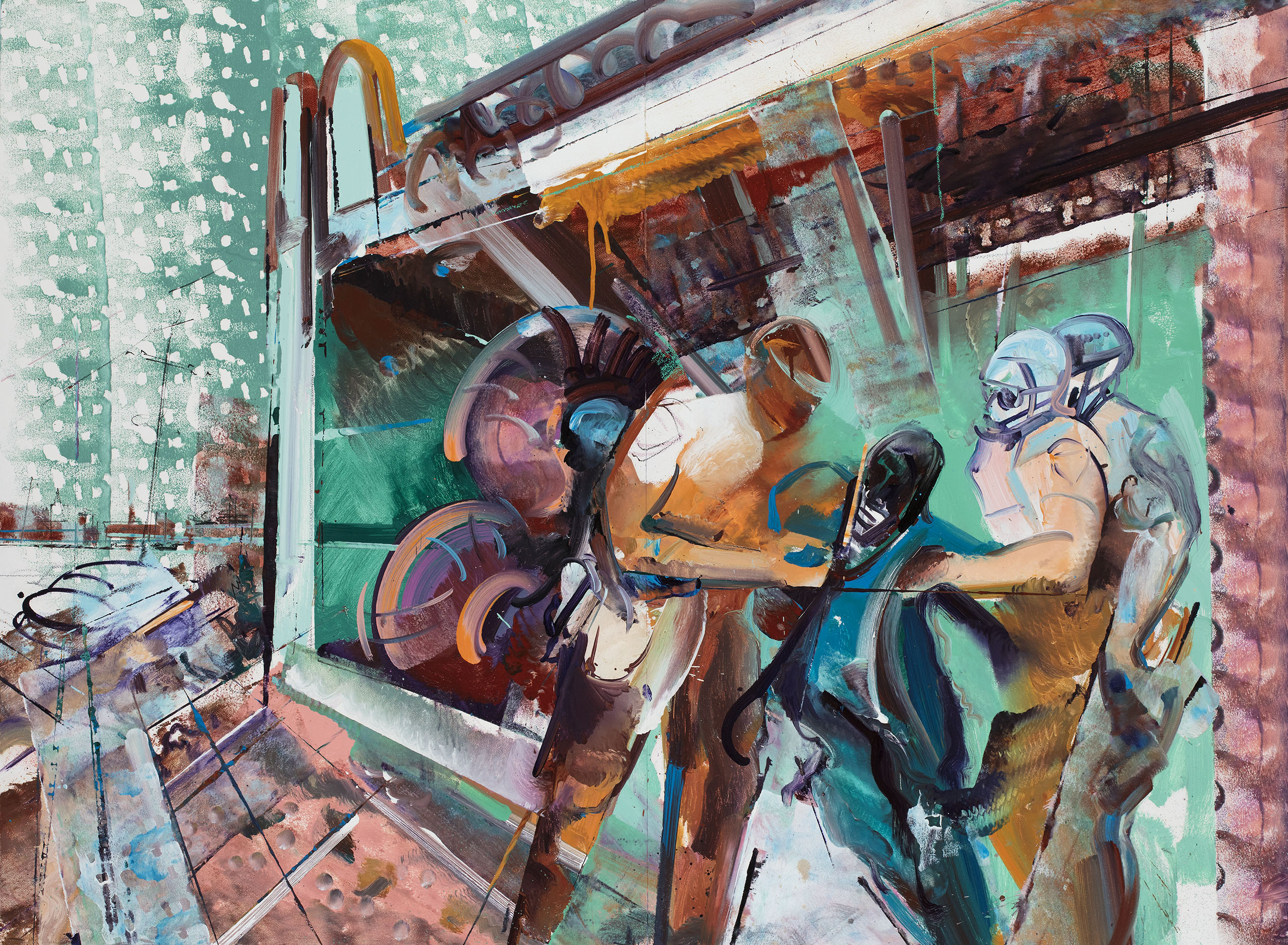
"McDs Playland Arrest" by David Brewster, 47 x 64 inches, Oil on Mi-Teintes, 2017

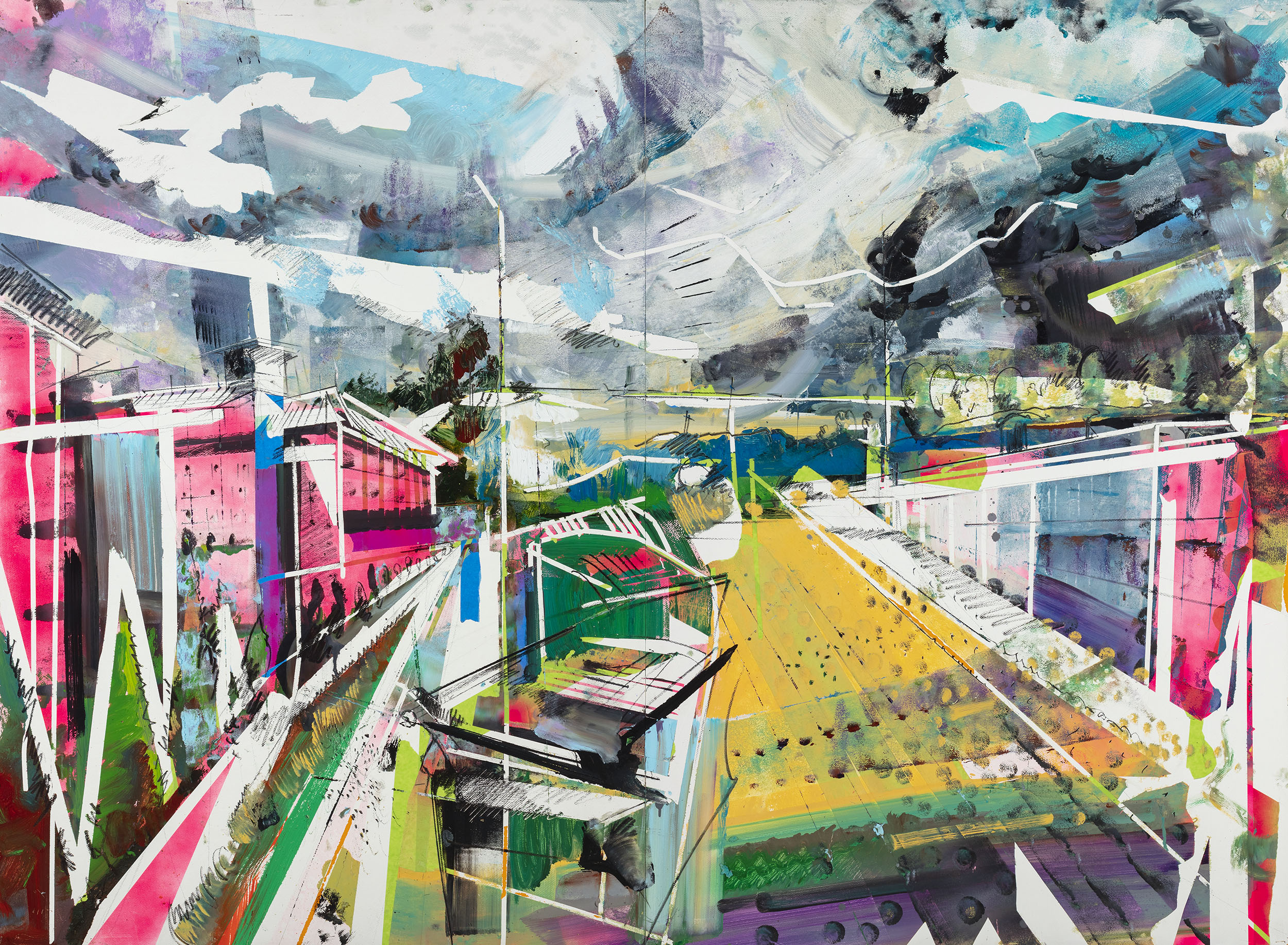
"Giant Shopping Emporium" by David Brewster, 47 x 64 inches, Oil on Mi-Teintes, 2019

David Brewster (born 1960) is an American painter active in the Mid-Atlantic and Northeastern United States.

== Early life and education ==
Brewster was born in Baltimore, Maryland and grew up on a farm in nearby Glyndon. His father was an investment banker and his mother worked at the Baltimore Museum of Art as a docent. Both parents were avid equestrians.

He studied at the Pennsylvania Academy of the Fine Arts in Philadelphia (1979–80) and the Leo Marchutz School of Painting and Drawing in Aix-en-Provence, France (1980–82), patterned on Oscar Kokoschka’s “School of Seeing” in Salzburg, Austria. He received a BFA from the Maryland Institute College of Art in Baltimore, MD (1985) and his MFA from the University of Pennsylvania in Philadelphia, PA (1988) where he studied with painter Neil Welliver.

== Career ==
Brewster often paints directly from the subject, creating works in a single pass in the spirit of the American Action painters of the mid 20th century. “He sits within a tradition the French call premier coup,” writes artist Stuart Shils,” meaning ‘all at once,’ an attitude toward work in which the graphic urgency of improvisation response underscores all decisions and informs the energy of the mark making.” Painter Anne Neely writes “it is as if each painting is chiseled with intensity and speaks to the desire on the part of the artist to find a way ‘into and through’ the space of the scene before him.” Mostly utilizing a variety of rollers to apply paint to canvas, Brewster opts for a brash, acid palette and aggressively works the surface with broad strokes of pigment. Poet and art critic Gerrit Henry writes that “the trick to Brewster, as it was indeed with the Abstract Expressionists, is this very painterly romanticism, called up from psychic depths and executed with an overwhelming conviction.”

Brewster's work references agriculture, urban landscapes, and commercial development, and often their decline and abandonment. Writer Edward Lucie-Smith describes Brewster's work as “a record of one man’s exhilarated dialogue with the natural world, and his spontaneous record of his own presence within it — they do not freeze a moment, but instead speak of a state of continuous psychic evolution.”

Brewster has been a visiting artist and lecturer at Maryland Institute College of Art in Baltimore, MD (2019); Assumption University in Bangkok, Thailand (2019); Pennsylvania Academy of the Fine Arts in Philadelphia, PA (2013); Towson University in Baltimore, MD (2013) and at Marlboro College in Marlboro, VT (2009). He taught painting at the Pomfret School in Pomfret, CT (1995–2000); at Deerfield Academy in Deerfield, MA (2003–2005); and at Milton Academy in Milton, MA (2007–2008). He was a teacher in residence at Deep Springs College (high desert of Eastern CA) both in 2003 and in 2006.

Brewster has had more than forty solo exhibitions, including "Structure and Perspective: David Brewster's Social Landscape" at the Maryland Center for History and Culture (2017–2019) and "David Brewster: 20 Year Retrospective" at Wilson Museum/Southern Vermont Arts Center (2016). In 2011–2012, Brewster created a suite of large-scale paintings and drawings that are permanently installed on the campus of the Wharton School of Business, University of Pennsylvania, highlighting the life and career of Joseph Wharton, who founded the school in 1878. From October 2017 to April 2019, The Maryland Center for History and Culture in Baltimore, MD presented a large exhibit of commissioned paintings by Brewster addressing social justice themes which were paired with artifacts and historic paintings from their collection. In 2023 “Water Scarcity and the American West”, a solo exhibit of artworks in different mediums exploring the water scarcity crisis, opened at the Colorado State University Spur in Denver, Colorado.

Brewster is represented in private and museum collections including the Museum of Contemporary Art (Bangkok), Princeton University Art Museum, Berkeley Art Museum and Pacific Film Archive, Fleming Museum of Art, Woodmere Art Museum, Pennsylvania Academy of Fine Arts, Johns Hopkins Carey Business School, Vermont State House, The State Museum of Pennsylvania, the Maryland State Archives, and the Wharton School of the University of Pennsylvania. He has received numerous awards including the Pollock-Krasner and Berkshire Taconic Foundation Grants.

In 2010, Brewster founded the "Windy Mowing Artist Residency" in Halifax, Vermont in partnership with Maryland Institute College of Art, providing living and studio space for visiting artists.
