= David Brewster (disambiguation) =

David Brewster (1781–1868) was a Scottish scientist, inventor and writer.

David Brewster may also refer to:

- David P. Brewster (1801–1876), U.S. Representative from New York
- David Brewster (journalist) (born 1939), American journalist, founder of the Seattle Weekly and Crosscut.com
- David Brewster (painter) (born 1960), American painter
- David Brewster (politician) (1964–2021), former Ulster unionist politician
- Dave East, (birth name David Brewster Jr., born 1988) American rapper
