= Anne Neely =

American painter

Anne Neely (born 1946) is a painter based in Boston, Massachusetts, and Maine. She paints abstract paintings with an emphasis on landscapes and nature. She uses paint to explore imagined landscapes.

Neely has won multiple awards for her work. She has had residencies abroad, such as the Ballinglen Arts Foundation Fellowship Program in Ireland. The artist's work can be found in the collections of Armand Hammer Museum, Brooklyn Museum, Davis Museum and Cultural Center of Wellesley College, DeCordova Museum and Sculpture Park, The Farnesworth Art Museum, Grenwald Center for Graphic Arts at UCLA, Museum of Fine Arts, Boston, National Gallery of Art, Washington, DC, Rose Art Museum of Brandeis University, The Smithsonian's The National Museum of American Art, Whitney Museum of American Art.

In 2014, her multimedia exhibition, Water Stories: Conversations in Paint and Sound, opened at the Museum of Science, Boston. One of the paintings "Offshore" can now be found in Alaska Airlines' San Francisco Lounge.

Neely was a teacher at Milton Academy in Milton, Massachusetts, from 1974 to 2012, where she also served as director of the Nesto Gallery twice.

In 2018 AGNI had released Issue 88 of their Journal where Neely was an art feature, responsible for the cover "Blackbird Fly" along with an essay "A Necessity: Fearful Symmetries".
