= List of Hi Hi Puffy AmiYumi episodes =

This is a list of episodes of the animated television series Hi Hi Puffy AmiYumi, which was created by Cartoon Network's executive Sam Register. Episodes are in order of airing, with seasonal number, and all premiere dates are in the United States.

== Series overview ==
Season	Segments	Episodes	Originally released	
Season	Segments	Episodes	First released	Last released
Pilot			April 22, 2003	
1	39	13	November 19, 2004	March 25, 2005
2	39	13	April 22, 2005	November 25, 2005
3	39	13	February 17, 2006	June 27, 2006

== Episodes ==
=== Pilot (2003) ===
Hi Hi Puffy AmiYumi had an unaired pilot episode. Sam Register pitched the idea of Puffy AmiYumi having their own television series at Cartoon Network, and the studio Renegade Animation developed a test short on April 22, 2003, in hopes of swaying the channel to greenlit their show's production. Bits and pieces of it were shown in non-full versions as a preview on Cartoon Network DVDs and VHS tapes, and a full preview of the pilot was made available on the Teen Titans DVD (for its first season), albeit as a short promo. The entire pilot was found by the series' director, Darrell Van Citters, and was originally uploaded to Vimeo on April 5, 2018, with reuploads being common afterwards. Despite being his creation, this was the only time Sam Register ever wrote an episode of the series.

No.	Title	Directed by	Written by	Storyboard by	Original release date	Production code
0	"Hi Hi Puffy AmiYumi"	Darrell Van Citters	Sam Register	Scott O'Brien and Mike Giaimo	April 22, 2003	HHPAY000
Puffy AmiYumi move out from Japan to unintentionally discover the weirdness of America.

=== Season 1 (2004–05) ===
No. overall	No. in season	Title	Directed by	Written by	Storyboard by	Original release date	Prod. code
1a	1a	"Dis-Harmony"	Scott O'Brien	Robert & Michelle Lamoreaux	Scott O'Brien	November 19, 2004	HHPAY001a
Kaz holds a contest for Ami and Yumi's fans and a little girl named Harmony is chosen as the winner. She is so obsessed with Ami and Yumi that she will not leave them alone.
1b	1b	"Collect All 5"	Howie Perry	Steven Banks	Howie Perry	November 19, 2004	HHPAY001b
Ami becomes obsessed in collecting prizes from a cereal box. She has collected all of them except for the bunny one. She wants it so bad she makes a costume for Kaz to fit into, leaving Yumi to do something about her best friend's obsession.
1c	1c	"Ninjcompoop"	Howie Perry	Mitch Watson	Howie Perry	November 19, 2004	HHPAY001c
After a career test, Yumi orders a kit to train her to be a ninja. After becoming one, she goes too far and Ami must snap Yumi back to her normal self.
2a	2a	"Talent Suckers"	Darin McGowan	Robert & Michelle Lamoreaux	Darin McGowan	November 19, 2004	HHPAY002a
Ami and Yumi meet a bunch of overzealous goths who turn out to be vampires. The vampires strip the girls of their rock talents so that they can start their own band.
2b	2b	"Ole!"	Darin McGowan	Mitch Watson	Darin McGowan	November 19, 2004	HHPAY002b
When Ami and Yumi inadvertently best a bull while attending a bullfight in Mexico, they're regarded as heroes. Now the town expects them to fight El Diablo, the toughest bull in the country.
2c	2c	"Mini-Puffs"	Dave Pruiksma	Steven Banks and Dave Pruiksma	Dave Pruiksma	November 19, 2004	HHPAY002c
Kaz creates a new band called "The Mini-Puffs" – composed of two babies. The toddlers soon become popular, even more popular than the girls. Ami and Yumi soon plot to get their jobs back.
3a	3a	"Ami's Secret"	Darin McGowan	David Slack	Darin McGowan	November 26, 2004	HHPAY003a
When Ami starts behaving strangely, Yumi and Kaz conclude that she's embarking on a secret solo career.
3b	3b	"Taffy Trouble"	Mark Kausler	Robert & Michelle Lamoreaux	Mark Kausler	November 26, 2004	HHPAY003b
The girls are evicted out of the bus and work at a sweet factory where (at first) are offered a lot of sweets. Thinking their job is to eat as many as they can, Ami and Yumi do so and get fairly fat. When their job manager walks in, he explains their real job, making toffee. Without knowledge of how to work the toffee machine, they create a giant toffee ball that destroys anything in its path, and they soon race to stop it from wrecking the bus.
3c	3c	"Dance a Go-Go"	Dave Pruiksma	Robert & Michelle Lamoreaux	Dave Pruiksma	November 26, 2004	HHPAY003c
Ami convinces Yumi to be her partner in a TV dance contest. Unfortunately, during the contest, Ami is tripped by a competitor and stubs her toe.
4a	4a	"Ami Goes Bad"	Scott O'Brien	Robert & Michelle Lamoreaux	Scott O'Brien	December 3, 2004	HHPAY004a
When Ami buys a pair of drumsticks, she turns bad and Kaz explains that they belonged to a famous drummer. Yumi and Kaz plot to stop Ami before she causes real damage.
4b	4b	"Robo-Pop"	Mark Kausler	Robert & Michelle Lamoreaux	Mark Kausler	December 3, 2004	HHPAY004b
Kaz builds Ami and Yumi robots in order for the pair to cover more concerts and personal appearances so the real Ami and Yumi can have more spare time off without losing any profits. Pretty soon, the robot versions are making numerous appearances, performing concerts, starring in movies and stage musicals, and waiting on Kaz hand and foot – all at the same time.
4c	4c	"Metal Mental"	Howie Perry	Robert & Michelle Lamoreaux	Howie Perry	December 3, 2004	HHPAY004c
Puffy gets booked on tour with Metal Breath – the most obnoxious, nasty and untalented heavy metal band in the world. Ami and Yumi soon grow tired of Metal Breath and plot to get rid of the group.
5a	5a	"Showdown"	Dave Pruiksma	Mitch Watson	Dave Pruiksma	December 10, 2004	HHPAY005a
While driving out West, the Puffy bus gets caught in a dust storm and smashes into a building – where three cowboys crawl from the rubble. But it isn't until later that the girls realize that the cowboys are the infamous Burlap Boys.
5b	5b	"In the Cards"	Scott O'Brien	Robert & Michelle Lamoreaux	Scott O'Brien	December 10, 2004	HHPAY005b
Ami and Yumi duel against each other in Stu-Pi-Doh (a parody of the card game Yu-Gi-Oh!) to win the heart of a nerd named King Chad.
5c	5c	"Team Teen"	Howie Perry	Robert & Michelle Lamoreaux	Howie Perry	December 10, 2004	HHPAY005c
After Yumi inadvertently helps a team of teen superheroes thwart their nemesis, she and Ami are asked to join the squad. The girls hit the streets fighting evil and they soon face a tough foe. Note: This episode is a parody of Teen Titans, which the real-life Ami and Yumi sang the theme song for.
6a	6a	"Opera Yumi" "Aria Yumi"	Mark Kausler	Ken Segall and Darrell Van Citters	Mark Kausler	December 17, 2004	HHPAY006a
When Yumi's old opera teacher comes back, she hypnotizes Yumi with a whistle in order to get her back into the opera business. Note: The voice guest star is Karen Hartman as Opera Singing Yumi.
6b	6b	"Save the Farm"	Mark Kausler	David Slack	Mark Kausler	December 17, 2004	HHPAY006b
Ami and Yumi go to work on a farm that is close to becoming a parking lot.
6c	6c	"Pen Pal"	Dave Pruiksma	Mitch Watson	Dave Pruiksma	December 17, 2004	HHPAY006c
Ami thinks her pen pal is an attractive guy. But when he arrives, he is the exact opposite of what she dreamed.
7a	7a	"Surf's Up"	Scott O'Brien	Michelle & Robert Lamoreaux	Scott O'Brien	December 31, 2004	HHPAY007a
When Ami convinces Yumi to join her in a surfing competition, Yumi reluctantly agrees. However, it isn't until the girls are hit by a giant wave and stranded at sea that Yumi realizes Ami doesn't know how to surf. Note: This episode was planned to premiere on December 31, 2004 (along with "Stupid Cupids" and "Brat Attack"), but was pulled out of respect after the Indian Ocean tsunami had hit earlier that week and replaced with a rerun of "Save the Farm". It would however air on foreign networks, and was later released on the Latin American HBO Max service. It was also originally titled "TsunAmi Yumi".
7b	7b	"Stupid Cupids"	Unknown	Michelle & Robert Lamoreaux	Will Finn	December 31, 2004	HHPAY007b
When Ami and Yumi come to the conclusion that Kaz is lonely, they decide to set him out on a date and give him a makeover.
7c	7c	"Brat Attack"	Unknown	Michelle & Robert Lamoreaux	Will Finn	December 31, 2004	HHPAY007c
When Kaz books Ami and Yumi to play at a spoiled rich kid's birthday party, they're totally bummed – and it only gets worse when Kaz sells them to the child's father for $10 million.
8a	8a	"Kaz Almighty"	Darin McGowan	Michelle & Robert Lamoreaux	Darin McGowan	January 7, 2005	HHPAY008a
While the girls play a concert on a tropical island, the locals start seeing Kaz as their almighty ruler. Ami and Yumi plot to reveal Kaz for the fraud that he is.
8b	8b	"Allergic"	Unknown	Michelle Lamoreaux, Robert Lamoreaux and Dave Pruiksma	Dave Pruiksma	January 7, 2005	HHPAY008b
One day, Yumi starts sneezing uncontrollably. Kaz thinks that after being together for so long, Yumi has become allergic to Ami.
8c	8c	"Spaced Out"	Scott O'Brien	Michelle & Robert Lamoreaux	Scott O'Brien	January 7, 2005	HHPAY008c
While driving across the desert, the trio get abducted by ornery aliens who are intent on performing weird experiments on them.
9a	9a	"Yumi Saves Kaz"	Mike Kazaleh	Michelle & Robert Lamoreaux	Mike Kazaleh	January 14, 2005	HHPAY009a
After a freak doughnut sign accident, Yumi saves Kaz from being squished. Kaz is so grateful to Yumi that he starts doing favors for her. Until then, she gets annoyed.
9b	9b	"Rock n Roe"	Mark Kausler	Michelle & Robert Lamoreaux	Mark Kausler	January 14, 2005	HHPAY009b
The trio run out of food, so Kaz goes to a fancy restaurant and drops the girls at a seafood place called the Sushi Shack. Ami and Yumi try the food - which is cheap sushi - and they like it so much that they "polish off the entire meal", causing them to suffer strange nightmares.
9c	9c	"Scowlitis"	Mike Kazaleh	Michelle & Robert Lamoreaux	Mike Kazaleh	January 14, 2005	HHPAY009c
After a doctor's checkup, Yumi finds that she has scowlitis, an epidemic where a person scowls excessively. Yumi is forced to wear a huge head brace with a smile, literally.
10a	10a	"Treasure Map"	Scott O'Brien	David Slack	Scott O'Brien	January 21, 2005	HHPAY010a
Ami, Yumi, and Kaz find a treasure map while driving to their next destination. Being wrapped around greed, the trio start to fight one another to take the treasure map for themselves, only to find that the so-called "treasure map" is actually an abstract painting.
10b	10b	"Kaz vs. Katz"	Mike Kazaleh	Mike Kazaleh	Mike Kazaleh	January 21, 2005	HHPAY010b
Alone with the girls' cats (Jang Keng and Tekirai), Kaz decides to get them out of his hair by putting them outside for the night. But the cats quickly outsmart Kaz and lock him outside.
10c	10c	"Bad Manager"	Howie Perry	Mitch Watson	Howie Perry	January 21, 2005	HHPAY010c
Kaz goes to a rock-paper-scissors contest, and loses the girls after he bets them. Surprisingly, Slick Shady, the new manager, treats them much better. Ami and Yumi soon miss their old life and plot to get Kaz back.
11a	11a	"The Amazing Kaz-Am"	Darin McGowan	Mitch Watson	Darin McGowan	January 28, 2005	HHPAY011a
The band stop in Las Vegas to do a show, only to find that the show is being performed by a magician called "The Amazing Kaz-Am". Kaz admits that back when he was a kid, he always wanted to become a magician, and this is the thing that will make his dream come true. After many a great failed magic tricks, however, Kaz has no choice but to attempt an incredibly dangerous escape trick...
11b	11b	"Puffylicious"	Mark Kausler	Robert & Michelle Lamoreaux	Mark Kausler	January 28, 2005	HHPAY011b
The band get their very own restaurant, with Ami and Yumi as the employees. But when a food critic comes to their restaurant, the girls have to make something delicious, or else face the consequences.
11c	11c	"Lights, Camera, Danger"	Unknown	Dave Pruiksma	Dave Pruiksma	January 28, 2005	HHPAY011c
When Kaz signs Ami and Yumi up to do a movie, it doesn't take a while for the girls to figure out that the stunts they do are dangerous.
12a	12a	"Fan Clubs"	Scott O'Brien	Adam Beechen	Scott O'Brien	February 4, 2005	HHPAY012a
Ami and Yumi get nice gifts from their fan clubs. Not wanting to hurt each other's feelings, they hid every gift in Kaz's room.
12b	12b	"Cat Nap"	Darin McGowan	Darin McGowan	Darin McGowan	February 4, 2005	HHPAY012b
Kaz keeps disturbing the cats' beauty sleep. So the cats play devious tricks on him when he goes to sleep himself.
12c	12c	"Cursed"	Unknown	Mitch Watson	Mike Kazaleh	February 4, 2005	HHPAY012c
Ami and Yumi are supposedly cursed after breaking both of their instruments. As they try to endure it, their bad luck keeps increasing.
13a	13a	"Eye Sore"	Mark Kausler	Mark Kausler	Mark Kausler	March 25, 2005	HHPAY013a
When Kaz accidentally flushes his glasses down the toilet, the cats find out first hand exactly how blind Kaz is. He unwittingly uses the cats as dust mops, wears them as accessories and nearly destroys the bus.
13b	13b	"Mean Machine"	Howie Perry	Mitch Watson	Howie Perry	March 25, 2005	HHPAY013b
The girls and Kaz meet up with an eccentric inventor who introduces them to his latest creation: an all-in-one music machine. At first the girls love it, until it steals their fans.
13c	13c	"Sea Sick"	Unknown	Robert & Michelle Lamoreaux	Dave Pruiksma	March 25, 2005	HHPAY013c
Kaz books the girls to be the entertainment on a cruise for "active seniors", where they unexpectedly lock horns with Silky Lame.

=== Season 2 (2005) ===
No. overall	No. in season	Title	Directed by	Written by	Storyboard by	Original release date	Prod. code
14a	1a	"Koi Fish"	Darin McGowan	Scott Gray	Darin McGowan	April 22, 2005	HHPAY014a
After Yumi makes a mistake that leads to their van crashing into a dumpster, Ami discovers an all-knowing Koi fish. Yumi becomes obsessed with it to avoid any more mistakes, much to Ami's dismay.
14b	1b	"Arbor Day"	Howie Perry	Adam Beechen	Howie Perry	April 22, 2005	HHPAY014b
After Kaz almost runs over a squirrel who left his home due to Eldwin Blair chopping down trees for toothpicks, Ami and Yumi decide to help the squirrel get his home back.
14c	1c	"Ami Ami"	Scott O'Brien	Adam Beechen	Scott O'Brien	April 22, 2005	HHPAY014c
After Yumi has an accident with the microwave, she starts to think she's Ami. This leads to Ami and Kaz trying to get her back to normal in any way they could think of.
15a	2a	"Visiting Hours"	Scott O'Brien	Adam Beechen	Will Finn	May 27, 2005	HHPAY015a
Ami and Yumi come back to their tour bus and find a note that Kaz left saying that he had to go to the hospital. When they visit the hospital, they face a tough nurse who refuses to let them see Kaz.
15b	2b	"Kitty Kontest"	Unknown	Mike Kazaleh	Mike Kazaleh	May 27, 2005	HHPAY015b
Kaz enters Ami and Yumi's cats in a contest, but it turns out the cat contest isn't for a few months, so Kaz decides to enter the cats in a dog contest by pretending that they're dogs.
15c	2c	"Chow Down"	Howie Perry	David Shayne	Howie Perry	May 27, 2005	HHPAY015c
Unlike Ami and Kaz, Yumi has never won a trophy before. Intent on winning one, she enters a tofu-dog eating contest. However, she faces a very tough competitor.
16a	3a	"Hungry Yumi"	Darin McGowan	Guy Toubes	Darin McGowan	June 3, 2005	HHPAY016a
When Yumi's midnight hunger strikes, she wants a Pink Palace cheeseburger. Yumi convinces Ami to drive her to a Pink Palace location. They end up going everywhere because the other locations get into trouble.
16b	3b	"The Oddyguard"	Darin McGowan	Adam Beechen	Mike Kazaleh	June 3, 2005	HHPAY016b
When the girls are repeatedly getting attacked by fans after shows, Kaz hires them a body guard named Wall. When Wall becomes too protective about his clients, Ami and Yumi plot to have him fired.
16c	3c	"Song Sung Bad"	Mark Kausler	Guy Toubes	Mark Kausler	June 3, 2005	HHPAY016c
Kaz writes a song, but Ami and Yumi don't like it. They don't want to let Kaz know in fears of disappointing him.
17a	4a	"Helping Hand"	Scott O'Brien	Adam Beechen	Scott O'Brien	June 10, 2005	HHPAY017a
Yumi cramps her hands badly while signing autographs and can't use them, so Ami decides to help Yumi out. Yumi then takes advantage of Ami.
17b	4b	"Neat Freak"	Darin McGowan	Bill Matheny	Darin McGowan	June 10, 2005	HHPAY017b
Ami is tired about not having the group being very clean. She forces Kaz and Yumi to clean the bus completely, but soon Ami can't find her drumsticks on the night of a concert.
17c	4c	"Hypno-Kaz"	Darin McGowan	David Shayne	Bruce Morris	June 10, 2005	HHPAY017c
A magician named Dr. Mysto tries to hypnotize Yumi and cure her of nail biting, but he hypnotizes Kaz by mistake.
18a	5a	"In Harmony's Way"	Scott O'Brien	Scott Gray	Scott O'Brien	June 17, 2005	HHPAY018a
At an auction, Yumi and Kaz accidentally sell Ami's diary to Harmony, who refuses to give it back. Ami and Yumi must become Harmony's best friend in order to get it back.
18b	5b	"Time Off"	Howie Perry	Guy Toubes	Mike Kazaleh	June 17, 2005	HHPAY018b
Yumi is tired of Ami always waking her up early, so Yumi sets Ami's clock backwards by 5 seconds. The clock affects Ami as she loses her sense of timing.
18c	5c	"Home Insecurity"	Mark Kausler	Scott Gray	Mark Kausler	June 17, 2005	HHPAY018c
Yumi is tired of Ami using her stuff without her permission, so Yumi gets a security system that attacks whoever comes into her room. However, what happens when the security system soon targets Yumi herself?
19a	6a	"Uninvited"	Shellie Kvilvang	Adam Beechen	Shellie Kvilvang	August 26, 2005	HHPAY019a
Kaz has a party in a hotel room and doesn't invite Ami and Yumi, so the girls try to sneak into the party.
19b	6b	"Camping Caper"	Howie Perry	Chris Hicks and Francis Lombard	Howie Perry	August 26, 2005	HHPAY019b
Ami takes Yumi camping, so that Yumi can receive some fresh air, after she had been in her room for almost a week. Then, Ami gets kidnapped by Bigfoot.
19c	6c	"Cell Block Rock"	Howie Perry	Scott Gray	Will Finn	August 26, 2005	HHPAY019c
Ami and Yumi end up in prison, after Kaz mistakes them for crooks.
20a	7a	"AmiYumi 3000"	Howie Perry	Adam Beechen	Howie Perry	September 2, 2005	HHPAY020a
Ami and Yumi are transported to the year 3000 where they discover the whole world is dedicated to them. The citizens turn against them, so Ami and Yumi try to get back to their own time.
20b	7b	"The Ride Stuff"	Darin McGowan	Kim Evey and Greg Benson	Bruce Morris	September 2, 2005	HHPAY020b
Ami and Yumi play music at a theme park called Adventure Farm Fun Land. After the concert, the girls and Kaz decide to try out the park's new roller coaster called the Heart Stopper. However, Kaz is too short to ride it. The duo try to sneak Kaz on in every way they think of.
20c	7c	"Were-Kaz"	Darin McGowan	Kim Evey and Greg Benson	Darin McGowan	September 2, 2005	HHPAY020c
Kaz is sick of being bald, so he gets some hair-growing liquid to grow his hair back. Then however, something scary happens: he suddenly becomes a werewolf, and soon starts chasing Ami and Yumi's cats around their bus. What will Ami and Yumi do?
21a	8a	"Ski Sick"	Shellie Kvilvang	Kim Evey and Greg Benson	Shellie Kvilvang	September 9, 2005	HHPAY021a
Kaz books a ski trip for him, Ami and Yumi. Ami wants her and Yumi to ski down a steep hill. The only problem is, Yumi doesn't know how to ski.
21b	8b	"Claw and Order"	Unknown	Mark Kausler	Mark Kausler	September 9, 2005	HHPAY021b
Fed up with Ami and Yumi's cats scratching up his stuff, Kaz tries to build Jang Keng and Tekirai a scratching post. Note: The episode's name is a reference to Law & Order.
21c	8c	"Janice Jealous"	Scott O'Brien	Guy Toubes	Scott O'Brien	September 9, 2005	HHPAY021c
Chad, the Stu-Pi-Doh champion, comes back and has a new girlfriend named Janice. Ami and Yumi become jealous of Janice and try to convince Chad to break up with her.
22a	9a	"Domo"	Howie Perry	Guy Toubes	Howie Perry	September 16, 2005	HHPAY022a
When Kaz goes out and buys and a dog that looks just like him things start going crazy. When big time company owners come Kaz isn't there but Domo is. The girls then plot to keep the owners from leaving.
22b	9b	"Yumi Goes Solo"	Unknown	Maureen Driscoll	Bruce Morris	September 16, 2005	HHPAY022b
Yumi gets fed up with Ami and Kaz giving her all the hard work, so she wishes that there was no such thing as Puffy AmiYumi. Her wish comes true, but Ami and Kaz are now having a hard life, and Yumi realizes how miserable she is without them.
22c	9c	"Cat Feud"	Unknown	Mark Kausler	Mark Kausler	September 16, 2005	HHPAY022c
Kaz is once again fed up with Jang Keng and Tekirai and tries to frame them for various crimes.
23a	10a	"Super Zero!"	Scott O'Brien	Guy Toubes	Scott O'Brien	November 4, 2005	HHPAY023a
Ami and Yumi are visited by an old friend named Atchan who thinks he's a superhero. Can Atchan help Yumi when she, Ami and Kaz are kidnapped by the giant snake monster Sunikura?
23b	10b	"Artist Ami"	Shellie Kvilvang	Ford Riley	Shellie Kvilvang	November 4, 2005	HHPAY023b
Ami's bad attempt at an album cover is discovered by an art critic who suggests to Ami that she should become an artist.
23c	10c	"Ikkakujuu"	Darin McGowan	Adam Beechen	Darin McGowan	November 4, 2005	HHPAY023c
After breaking Yumi's new guitar, Ami tries to convince Yumi and Kaz that she saw a unicorn. Note: This is the only episode where no dialogue is heard.
24a	11a	"Run Cat Run"	Howie Perry	Ford Riley	Howie Perry	November 11, 2005	HHPAY024a
Kaz enters the cats into a racing contest, much to Ami and Yumi's disapproval.
24b	11b	"Driving School"	Howie Perry	J. Torres	Will Finn	November 11, 2005	HHPAY024b
Ami thinks Yumi and Kaz are dangerous drivers, so she makes them take driving classes.
24c	11c	"Record Breakers"	Darin McGowan	Brooks McBeth	Mark Kausler	November 11, 2005	HHPAY024c
The girls compete with each other to complete a world record.
25a	12a	"Rock Lobsters"	Howie Perry	Howie Perry	Howie Perry	November 18, 2005	HHPAY025a
Ami and Yumi try to save lobsters from a seafood restaurant.
25b	12b	"Phantom of Rock"	Shellie Kvilvang	David Shayne	Shellie Kvilvang and Darin McGowan	November 18, 2005	HHPAY025b
Kaz is tired of how terrible Ami and Yumi play, so he seeks the help of phantom rocker Johnny Ghost. The girls then get trapped in his haunted mansion.
25c	12c	"Fungus"	Scott O'Brien	Adam Beechen	Bruce Morris	November 18, 2005	HHPAY025c
Ami adopts a hunk of fungus that comes from their shower.
26a	13a	"Soapbox Derby"	Scott O'Brien	Adam Beechen and Scott Gray	Darin McGowan and Scott O'Brien	November 25, 2005	HHPAY026a
Ami, Yumi, and Kaz compete against Axel and Rod Skidmark in a soapbox derby.
26b	13b	"Talent Suckers Return"	Darin McGowan	Guy Toubes	Darin McGowan	November 25, 2005	HHPAY026b
The Talent Suckers seek a job in order to pay off some debts.
26c	13c	"Prisoners of Yoyovia"	Howie Perry	Adam Beechen	Mark Kausler	November 25, 2005	HHPAY026c
Ami and Yumi become slaves in a country.

=== Season 3 (2006) ===
No. overall	No. in season	Title	Directed by	Written by	Storyboarded by	Original release date	Prod. code
27a	1a	"Secret Origin"	Scott O'Brien	Guy Toubes	Scott O'Brien	February 17, 2006	HHPAY028a
In their childhood years, Ami and Yumi arrive at Camp Youwannasushi and are met by Atchan, who tells them about Rumaki the bunk monster. Yumi is grabbed by Rumaki and Ami and Atchan go under the bed to save her.
27b	1b	"The Legend of Mei Pie"	Howie Perry	David Shayne	Howie Perry	February 17, 2006	HHPAY028b
Yumi needs a new guitar and must accomplish certain tasks to get one. So she meets Master Mei Pie, who sends her to get some items.
27c	1c	"Under the Hood"	Bruce Morris	David Shayne	Bruce Morris	February 17, 2006	HHPAY028c
The tour bus is acting erratically and Ami and Yumi go inside to find out what is wrong. They find out that the man who sold them the bus had moved into its carburetor.
28a	2a	"Movie Madness"	Unknown	Kim Evey	Joe Orrantia	February 24, 2006	HHPAY029a
Yumi is chosen to be a movie star, but Ami has to be her stunt double.
28b	2b	"Stop the Presses"	Shellie Kvilvang	Adam Beechen	Shellie Kvilvang	February 24, 2006	HHPAY029b
Ami and Yumi have to stop other people seeing an embarrassing photo of Ami in the newspaper.
28c	2c	"Hired Help"	James Lopez	Joelle Sellner	James Lopez	February 24, 2006	HHPAY029c
Ami asks Wall to help out with the band, but he's not good at it.
29a	3a	"Puffy BC"	Darin McGowan	Adam Beechen	Darin McGowan	March 3, 2006	HHPAY027a
In prehistoric times, Primitive Ami and Primitive Yumi create their own music, and Primitive Kaz tries to get the two to join together and form a band.
29b	3b	"Dupli-Cats"	Howie Perry	Ursula Ziegler and Michelle Gendelman	Howie Perry	March 3, 2006	HHPAY027b
Jeng Keng and Tekirai clone themselves to get rid of Domo.
29c	3c	"Agent Y"	Bruce Morris	Guy Toubes	Bruce Morris	March 3, 2006	HHPAY027c
Yumi is mistaken for a secret agent and must handle the real agent's job.
30a	4a	"Manga Madness"	Scott O'Brien	Guy Toubes	Scott O'Brien	March 10, 2006	HHPAY030a
After coming to life, Ami and Yumi's favorite manga characters battle each other. The fight gets out of hand and it's up to Ami and Yumi to stop them.
30b	4b	"Junior Tapeworm"	Shellie Kvilvang	Brooks McBeth	Shellie Kvilvang	March 10, 2006	HHPAY030b
While focusing on Puffy AmiYumi, Harmony is disturbed by a member of the Junior Tapeworms and she soon becomes a member and is always getting a badge for every achievement she does.
30c	4c	"Kazalot"	Bruce Morris	Steve Kriozere	Bruce Morris	March 10, 2006	HHPAY030c
Ami must fight the Black Knight to see who will defend Kazalot.
31a 31b	5a 5b	"The Golden Fleas"	Darin McGowan	Scott Gray	Darin McGowan	April 7, 2006	HHPAY031a HHPAY031b
When their instruments break, Ami and Yumi go on a quest for golden fleas. They need to find them before the concert is cancelled.
31c	5c	"Sitcomi-Yumi"	Howie Perry	Guy Toubes	Howie Perry	April 7, 2006	HHPAY031c
The girls and Kaz try out for a sitcom, hoping for good reviews. However, there are continuous bad reviews. The real Ami and Yumi make an appearance in this segment.
32a	6a	"Spree!"	Unknown	David Shayne	James Lopez	April 21, 2006	HHPAY032a
Ami and Yumi win one million Yen. They have to think of a way to spend it all in only six minutes.
32b	6b	"Granny"	Unknown	Scott Gray	Joe Orrantia	April 21, 2006	HHPAY032b
The girls need to find a way to hide their rock-star lives from Ami's grandmother in case she suffers a heart attack.
32c	6c	"A Grave Mistake"	Brian Hatfield and Darin McGowan	Joelle Sellner	Brian Hatfield	April 21, 2006	HHPAY032c
The Talent Suckers use zombies to increase their popularity, but it proves ineffective.
33a	7a	"Motor-Psycho Mamas"	Unknown	J. Torres	Joe Orrantia	April 28, 2006	HHPAY033a
A gang of bikers attack London. The girls must stop them before they take the city over.
33b	7b	"Oldie AmiYumi"	Shellie Kvilvang	Brooks McBeth	Shellie Kvilvang	April 28, 2006	HHPAY033b
Years into the future, Ami, Yumi, and Kaz are all living in a retirement home. Rocking is prohibited, however, so the trio try to find other enjoyable things to do.
33c	7c	"Trouble with Mimes"	Howie Perry	Guy Toubes; Story by : Brian Beauchamp	Howie Perry	April 28, 2006	HHPAY033c
Ami, Yumi, and Kaz have trouble with a mime named Si, and need a way to get rid of him.
34a	8a	"Jungle Prom"	Shellie Kvilvang	Ursula Ziegler and Michelle Gendelman	Shellie Kvilvang	May 26, 2006	HHPAY039a
In the series finale The girls go to a prom in the jungle to help a man be with his crush.
34b	8b	"Truth or Dare"	Brian Hatfield and Darin McGowan	Adam Beechen	Brian Hatfield	May 26, 2006	HHPAY039b
The girls play a game of Truth or Dare.
34c	8c	"Sumo Kaz"	Darin McGowan	David Shayne; Story by : Dave Markowitz	Darin McGowan	May 26, 2006	HHPAY039c
With the help of the girls, Kaz trains to become a sumo wrestler and has his first match. Note: This episode was originally the first segment because "Jungle Prom" was the ultimate segment to air.
35a	9a	"Tooth Decay"	Unknown	J. Torres	James Lopez	June 2, 2006	HHPAY034a
Ami and Yumi look for loose teeth when the tooth fairy is unable to do so, and they must do it before the sun rises.
35b	9b	"Gridiron Maidens"	Bruce Morris	Shannon Denton and Keith Giffen	Bruce Morris	June 2, 2006	HHPAY034b
Kaz makes Ami join his football team after she throws it into a tree.
35c	9c	"Sound Off"	Scott O'Brien	Adam Beechen	Scott O'Brien	June 2, 2006	HHPAY034c
Ami, Yumi, and Kaz have a strange experience when the soundtrack is completely wrong. So the girls must go and fix it.
36a	10a	"Small Stuff"	Scott O'Brien	Adam Beechen	Scott O'Brien	June 9, 2006	HHPAY036a
Ami and Yumi give their cats a bath, but they fall in the dryer and shrink. The girls must find a way to return to normal size.
36b	10b	"B.C. Road Trip"	Darin McGowan	Guy Toubes	Darin McGowan	June 9, 2006	HHPAY036b
Kaz tries to find a way to carry Ami and Yumi's instruments to their next gig without the need of a tour bus.
36c	10c	"Puffynauts"	Unknown	Scott Gray	James Lopez	June 9, 2006	HHPAY036c
Ami, Yumi, and Kaz get lost in space as they head to their next gig.
37a	11a	"Evil AmiYumi"	Bruce Morris	Guy Toubes	Bruce Morris	June 16, 2006	HHPAY035a
A lightning storm causes Yumi to switch places with her evil counterpart. Then, Ami and Kaz's evil forms come to life, and chaos ensues.
37b	11b	"Butterscotch"	Brian Hatfield	Jack Siegel	Brian Hatfield	June 16, 2006	HHPAY035b
Kaz accidentally knocks out a horse named Butterscotch, and Ami and Yumi dress up as the horse to help Kaz out at a rodeo.
37c	11c	"Big Waldo"	Brian Hatfield	Scott Gray	Brian Hatfield	June 16, 2006	HHPAY035c
An alligator named Waldo appears and startles Ami and Yumi. The girls then try to get rid of him.
38a	12a	"Disco Caper"	Darin McGowan	David Shayne	Darin McGowan	June 23, 2006	HHPAY038a
Ami and Yumi travel back to 1977 to become disco stars.
38b	12b	"House Unkeeping"	Howie Perry	Howie Perry; Story by : Brooks McBeth	Howie Perry	June 23, 2006	HHPAY038b
The girls are denied access to the Legends of Rock museum since they've never trashed a hotel room. Ami and Yumi try their best, but the plan becomes thwarted by an efficient maid.
38c	12c	"Number, Please"	Bruce Morris	Guy Toubes	Bruce Morris	June 23, 2006	HHPAY038c
Ami's cell phone overuse causes Kaz to take her cell phone away, leaving Ami to find alternate methods to communicate with other people.
39a	13a	"Manga Madness, Part II"	Scott O'Brien	Guy Toubes	Scott O'Brien	June 27, 2006	HHPAY037a
Kaz gets sent into a manga where he is captured by Mr. Maestro. Ami and Yumi try to rescue their manager with the aid of two heroes, a pencil, and an eraser.
39b	13b	"Julie AmiYumi"	Howie Perry	David Shayne	Howie Perry	June 27, 2006	HHPAY037b
Julie, a former member of Puffy AmiYumi, tries to destroy Ami and Yumi's band.
39c	13c	"It's Alive!"	Darin McGowan	Adam Beechen	Darin McGowan	June 27, 2006	HHPAY037c
In a Frankenstein-esque style, Ami, with the help of Yumi, creates a band manager to be in a rock band, but trouble rises when her creation escapes.
