= David Pruiksma =

American animator (born 1957)

David Pruiksma (born January 15, 1957) is an American animator best known for his work at The Walt Disney Company and occasionally other studios.

== Early life and education ==
Pruiksma was born and raised in Falls Church, Virginia where he attended J.E.B. Stuart High School. He graduated in 1975. He then studied art at the Pratt Institute in New York for two years. He left to attend California Institute of the Arts where he received a degree in character animation in 1981.

== Career ==
Following graduation, Pruiksma was hired as an assistant animator at Disney and worked on the films The Black Cauldron, The Great Mouse Detective, Oliver & Company, The Little Mermaid and The Rescuers Down Under. He rose to supervising animator and created the characters of Mrs. Potts and her son Chip in Beauty and the Beast. Other characters including The Sultan in Aladdin, Pumbaa's luau scene in The Lion King, Flit in Pocahontas, Hugo and Victor in The Hunchback of Notre Dame and Mrs. Wilhelmina Bertha Packard and Mister Fenton Q. Harcourt in Atlantis: The Lost Empire.

After completing working on 2001's Atlantis: The Lost Empire, Pruiksma left Disney because of his disenchantment with "Disney's greed-driven corporate structure." He then worked freelance as an animation director and storyboard artist for the Cartoon Network series Hi Hi Puffy AmiYumi. He also accepted a position teaching at the Laguna College of Art and Design (LCAD) from the animation department's former chair Dave Kuhn, who Pruiksma had trained at Disney.

Pruiksma was a full-time faculty member at LCAD in Laguna Beach, California until his retirement in 2018.

== Filmography ==
Year	Title	Credits	Characters	Notes
1985	The Black Cauldron	Assistant Animator		
1986	The Great Mouse Detective	Character Animator		
1987	The Chipmunk Adventure	Animator		Credited as Dave Pruiksma
1988	Oliver & Company	Character Animator		Credited as Dave Pruiksma
1989	The Little Mermaid	Character Animator		
1990	The Rescuers Down Under	Character Animator		Credited as Dave Pruiksma
1991	Beauty and the Beast	Supervising Animator	Mrs. Potts and Chip Potts	
1992	Aladdin	Supervising Animator	Sultan	
1994	The Lion King	Animator	Pumbaa	Credited as Dave Pruiksma
1995	Pocahontas	Supervising Animator / Additional Story Development Artist	Flit and Forest Animals	Credited as Dave Pruiksma
1996	The Hunchback of Notre Dame	Supervising Animator	Hugo and Victor	
2001	Atlantis: The Lost Empire	Supervising Animator	Mrs. Wilhelmina Bertha Packard and Mr. Fenton Q. Harcourt	Credited as Dave Pruiksma
2003	Captain Sturdy: The Originals (TV Short)	Additional Animator		Credited as Dave Pruiksma
2004-2005	One by One (Video short)	Animator		
2004-2005	Hi Hi Puffy AmiYumi (TV Series)	Story / Teleplay / Animation Director - 2 Episodes		Credited as Dave Pruiksma
2009	Waking Sleeping Beauty (Documentary)	Voice	Himself	
2013	A Little Hitch (Short)	Voice	Mother	
