= Allison Rutland =

Canadian animator and illustrator

Allison Rutland is a Canadian animator and illustrator, who has worked at major film studios such as Moving Picture Company, Framestore, and Pixar Studios. Rutland won the Annie Award for Outstanding Achievement for Character Animation in 2016.

== Early life ==
Rutland was raised in Milton, Ontario. She attended E.C. Drury High School.

She attended McMaster University's Fine Arts Program, receiving her bachelor's degree in 2002. She then attended Sheridan College's Computer Animation program, graduating in 2003.

== Career ==
Rutland's animation career started with animating for film studios in Toronto, Canada, working primarily on commercials and TV shows. After her work on the film Everyone's Hero, she was accepted into film studios in London, England. She worked in London for two years on visual effects for studios that produced movies such as The Tale of Despereaux, Where the Wild Things Are, and The Chronicles of Narnia: Prince Caspian.

Rutland began working for Pixar Studios in 2009. She works as both a character animator and directing animator for the film studio, and has worked on a number of films such as Finding Dory, Toy Story 3, Brave, Monsters University, Inside Out, and Coco.

Rutland notes across the animation studies in her career of a gender imbalance of women animators: she was the only woman in her Toronto employment, and one of twenty women employed by Pixar in 2009. She emphasis that although her encounter with gender imbalance "has not dramatically colored her experience, she would like to see more women in leadership roles in the field."

She also teaches online at the Academy of Art University.

== Influences ==
Rutland cites comic books Calvin and Hobbes, Garfield, and Archie Comics as initial artistic influences in her early life, as well as the film Who Framed Roger Rabbit.

Allison described on fellow colleagues as major supports in her animation career such as Holly Nichols and Morgan Ginsberg, which she said helped her transition from TV to feature film work, and that they were "invaluable to kicking off my career on a global scale."

== Awards and achievements ==
Rutland was the recipient of the Annie Award in 2016 for her work on Character Animation for Inside Out. She was nominated alongside colleague John Chun Chiu Lee for the Annie Award in 2017 for her work on Coco, with the award going to the former.

In 2017, Rutland was inducted in the Milton Walk of Fame.

== Filmography ==
- The Tale of Despereaux (2008), character animator
- Toy Story 3 (2010), character animator
- Brave (2012), character animator
- Monsters University (2013), character animator
- Inside Out (2015), character developer and animator
- Finding Dory (2016), character animator
- Coco (2017), character animator
- Incredibles 2 (2018), character animator
- Onward (2020), directing animator
- Soul (2020), character animator
- Turning Red (2022), character animator
- Elemental (2023), directing animator

== Other works ==
- Sammy the Snail, Book, illustrator
