= Hi Hi Puffy AmiYumi =

American television series (2004–2006)

- Genre: Comedy
- Created by: Sam Register
- Developed by: Shakeh Hagnazarian
- Starring: Ami Onuki; Yumi Yoshimura
- Voices of: Janice Kawaye; Grey DeLisle; Keone Young
- Theme music composer: Puffy AmiYumi; Andy Sturmer
- Opening theme: "Hi Hi" (Note: Performed by Puffy AmiYumi)
- Ending theme: "Hi Hi" (Instrumental)
- Composers: Puffy AmiYumi (Note: Original songs); Andy Sturmer
- Country of origin: United States
- Original language: English
- No. of seasons: 3
- No. of episodes: 39 (Note: 117 segments and 1 pilot) (list of episodes)

Production
- Executive producers: Sam Register; Brian A. Miller (Note: For Cartoon Network Studios)
- Producer: Ashley Postlewaite
- Editors: Thom Whitehead (Note: Season 1); Joe Campana; Nate Pacheco (Note: Seasons 1–2); Michael D'Ambrosio; Rick Greenwald (Note: Seasons 2–3)
- Running time: 22 minutes
- Production companies: Renegade Animation; Cartoon Network Studios (Note: Credited as Cartoon Network)

Original release
- Network: Cartoon Network
- Release: November 19, 2004 – June 27, 2006

Hi Hi Puffy AmiYumi is an American animated comedy television series created by Sam Register for Cartoon Network. It follows the adventures of rock stars Ami Onuki (Janice Kawaye) and Yumi Yoshimura (Grey DeLisle), who are fictionalized versions of the Japanese pop rock duo Puffy. The duo tour internationally with their greedy manager Kaz Harada (Keone Young) and their pet cats, Jang-Keng (DeLisle) and Tekirai (Kawaye). It was produced by Renegade Animation and Cartoon Network Studios.

The series premiered on November 19, 2004, and ended on June 27, 2006, with a total of three seasons and 39 episodes. During its short-lived run, the series was nominated for an Annie Award three times. Merchandise based on the series has also been produced, such as video games, home media releases, toys, and clothing.

== Premise ==
The main cast of the show. From left to right: Ami, Kaz, Yumi, Jang-Keng, and Tekirai.

Hi Hi Puffy AmiYumi follows the adventures of two best friends: the peppy, optimistic, cheerful, girly girl Ami Onuki (voiced by Janice Kawaye); and the cynical, sarcastic, grumpy tomboy Yumi Yoshimura (voiced by Grey DeLisle). Both are based on the Japanese pop duo Puffy AmiYumi, but with different appearances and exaggerated personalities. They travel around the world on their customized tour bus along with their well-intentioned yet greedy manager Kaz Harada (voiced by Keone Young). From rocking out at a concert to hanging out in their hometown of Tokyo, the duo take the world by storm with their musical talent, trend-setting style, and humor, dishing out lessons in J-pop justice and establishing the international language of "cool" along the way.

Secondary characters include: Jang-Keng (voiced by Grey DeLisle) and Tekirai (voiced by Janice Kawaye), the duo's pet cats who enjoy tormenting Kaz; Harmony (voiced by Sandy Fox), a six-year-old girl who is the self-proclaimed "Number One Fan" of Puffy AmiYumi and (later) Kaz and constantly stalks them; Eldwin Blair (voiced by Nathan Carlson), a sinister land developer who tries to tear down beloved places for his own selfish needs; the evil Talent Suckers (voiced by Nathan Carlson and Corey Burton), a vampire rock trio from Transylvania; and Atchan (voiced by Rob Paulsen), a caricature of Atsushi (lead singer of the punk band New Rote'ka) who speaks in third-person and thinks he is a superhero.

The animated Puffy AmiYumi travel all over the world in their tour bus. While appearing the same size as a regular bus on the outside, it appears to have enough internal space to house the girls' rooms (including full-sized beds), Kaz's room, their equipment, televisions, and computers, among other things. In the episode "Domo", Kaz refers to an upstairs area. It also seems capable of running on autopilot, as Kaz, Ami, and Yumi are sometimes sitting in the rear cabin of the bus while traveling. Occasionally, the rear door has been opened to receive packages delivered by a boy on a scooter.

During the first season, the show included live-action clips of the real Ami and Yumi making childish commentary (in English and non-subtitled Japanese) at the beginning and end of each episode. They only performed short clips at the beginning of the show during the second and third seasons. Starting with the second season, the duo was sometimes shown holding title cards introducing the cartoon segments. At the end of the episode "Sitcomi Yumi", Ami and Yumi watch television and see the animated Kaz with the real Ami and Yumi. All of the live-action clips were produced by Freegate, Ltd.

The real PUFFY performs the cartoon's theme song (which is also in Japanese, German, Spanish, and Portuguese in the respective countries), and many episodes feature one or more of the duo's songs playing in the background, along with music by Andy Sturmer.

Though the characters speak English, the script intersperses their vernacular with Japanese speech, especially when the characters react to events that they find to be surprising. Calling out "Tasukete!" instead of "Help!" is commonly used.

== Voice cast ==
- Janice Kawaye as Ami Onuki, Tekirai, News Reporter, Janice, Additional Voices
- Grey DeLisle as Yumi Yoshimura, Jang Keng, Little Girl, Jill (known as Fan Club President, "Fan Clubs"), Additional Voices
- Keone Young as Kaz Harada, Domo, Security Guard, El Diablo, Additional Voices
- Rob Paulsen as Atchan, Dr. Mysto, Clyde Easy Glide, Mr. Darrell, Additional Voices
- Corey Burton as Nicolai, Scar Tissue, Road Kill, Flash Backman, Additional Voices
- Nathan Carlson as Vlad, Mitch, Eldwin Blair, Master Peng, Additional Voices
- Sandy Fox as Harmony
- Katie Leigh as King Chad (known as Chad, "Janice Jealous")
- Phil Lollar as Wacky Wally
- Diane Michelle as Courtney, Monet Renoir, Veronica West, Nurse
- Kim Mai Guest as Ms. Patience, Granny, Myrna, Salesperson, Clerk, Woman
- Kimberly Brooks as Jill
- Lara Jill Miller as Julie
- Will Ryan as Farmer Zeke, Alien Banana #1, Wall, Rumaki, Old Camper #3, Wasabi, Sumo Wrestler, Muscle Bound Guy, Defensive End, Riptide's Coach
- William Hanna as Jang Keng (Tom and Jerry audio, "Small Stuff")

== Production ==
=== Development ===
According to Register, the target audience of the show is children from 6 to 11 years old. However, it also has a cult following of teen and adult fans of the real-life Ami Onuki and Yumi Yoshimura who make up the Japanese pop duo Puffy AmiYumi. Register, who was a fan of the band, wished to spread its fame to other parts of the world and thus created the series.

The series features the adventures of animated versions of the duo, who have been immensely popular in Japan since making their debut, and is the second television show to be based on the band after Pa-Pa-Pa-Pa-Puffy, which aired in Japan from 1997 to 2002. The group now has its own U.S. albums, including a 2004 companion album to this program, and was known to viewers of Cartoon Network in the U.S. for performing the theme to the Teen Titans animated series. During production of the series, DeLisle learned some Japanese from Kawaye and Young, both of whom speak the language fluently.

Produced entirely in the United States, the cartoon featured character designs by famed Canadian artist Lynne Naylor, known for her work on Samurai Jack and The Powerpuff Girls. The show itself was nominated for the coveted Annie Award three times. The pilot used a combination of Macromedia Flash and traditional cel animation. Each program was 30 minutes long (with commercials) and featured three seven-minute segments. The visual style of the show is anime-influenced.

The show takes inspiration from various works animated in Japan, such as Pokémon, Digimon, the Sunbow Productions animated series based on Hasbro properties, the Walt Disney Animation Japan animated production, the Marvel Productions animated series, the Studio Ghibli animated production, and the Rankin/Bass animated series. Other inspirations included old MGM and Warner Bros. cartoons, as well as Hanna-Barbera and Mirisch/UA cartoons, UPA shorts, and the works of Jay Ward. Some of the show's crew members included various writers from Nickelodeon's CatDog, including Steven Banks, Kit Boyce, and Robert Lamoreaux.

Sam Register originally pitched the idea of Puffy AmiYumi having their own television series on Cartoon Network, and afterwards, Renegade Animation developed a test short on April 22, 2003, in hopes of making the channel greenlight the show's production. Renegade Animation originally, at first, created other Cartoon Network pilots before Hi Hi Puffy AmiYumi; two of which feature Captain Sturdy; one in 2001, entitled "Back in Action", and the other in 2003, entitled "The Originals", but they were ultimately rejected, and Renegade Animation then started working on Hi Hi Puffy AmiYumi starting with its pilot on April 22, 2003. The pilot was not broadcast, but was initially successful, and got the green-light from Cartoon Network. Finally, it was shown in non-full version as a preview on Cartoon Network DVDs and VHS tapes. The entire pilot was found by series' director, Darrell Van Citters, and was uploaded to Vimeo on April 5, 2018. The series was officially announced at Cartoon Network's upfront on February 26, 2004. It was originally planned to premiere in December 2004, but was later moved up to November 19.

=== Cancellation ===
On October 2, 2006, the show's crew announced on their blog that Cartoon Network had cancelled Hi Hi Puffy AmiYumi after three seasons and 39 episodes, which was attributed to a management shakeup that culminated in Register's departure from the channel. Register later officially became the president of Cartoon Network Studios on August 28, 2020.

== Appearances in other media ==
The show had been acknowledged and referenced several times, even outside of Cartoon Network themselves. These also come in the form of parodies, albeit rare.

- A clip of the episode, "AmiYumi 3000", can be seen playing on TV in the film Nancy Drew.
- In 2012, Ami and Yumi appeared on Cartoon Network's 20th anniversary poster.
- Yumi later made a cameo appearance in the OK K.O.! Let's Be Heroes special Crossover Nexus.
- Ami and Yumi made a background appearance, within their poster in a TV pilot for Villainous.
- Ami's haircut appeared as a wardrobe item in the 2020 mobile game, KleptoCats: Cartoon Network.
- Parodies of Ami and Yumi, named Ori and Yori, show up in the Nickelodeon series Kappa Mikey.

== Series overview ==
Season	Segments	Episodes	Originally released	
Season	Segments	Episodes	First released	Last released
Pilot			April 22, 2003	
1	39	13	November 19, 2004	March 25, 2005
2	39	13	April 22, 2005	November 25, 2005
3	39	13	February 17, 2006	June 27, 2006

== Broadcast ==
Hi Hi Puffy AmiYumi premiered in the United States on Cartoon Network on November 19, 2004. After ending on June 27, 2006, the show continued to rerun until September 3, 2006, and occasionally would air as one of the few non-Cartoon Cartoons on The Cartoon Cartoon Show before being removed from the network’s schedule. It was intended to rerun on Boomerang afterward, but this plan never materialized.

Since Cartoon Network is available worldwide, the show has been dubbed into multiple languages and aired on Cartoon Network worldwide. In Canada, the series premiered on YTV on September 5, 2005. In Japan, the show began airing on Cartoon Network in English with Japanese subtitles in 2005. A dubbed version began airing on TV Tokyo's Oha Suta block on October 6, 2005, which premiered on Cartoon Network Japan on January 8th, 2006.

In Germany, the show is aired on Cartoon Network Germany with all episodes. It first premiered on Kabel eins’s Cartoon Network block in fall of 2005, but after CN became its own channel in 2006, the show was one of many to move from the block on Kabel eins to the channel.

In Poland, the show aired on Cartoon Network Poland from 2005 to 2006.

In Australia, the show premiered on April 3, 2005, but stopped airing on Cartoon Network Australia in November 2008 without showing the third season. However, upon launching in August 2009, the Australian channel 9Go! would air the show’s third season before removing the series in 2015.

As of December 2025, the show continues to air on Tooncast at 2:30am and 2:30pm, respectively, in both English and Spanish.

While the show has had a limited release on DVD in America, the entire series was released on HBO Max in Latin America. The release includes both the Spanish and original English tracks.

== Reception ==
=== Critical response ===
The Los Angeles Times wrote that the show is "modern, in its retro, Asian-tinged way – in other words, right in line with the Cartoon Network aesthetic – but nothing new", and called it "bright and loud and sensational".

=== Ratings ===
Hi Hi Puffy AmiYumi debuted on Cartoon Network on November 19, 2004, at 7:30 PM ET/PT with two half-hour episodes. The show charted double-digit increases with Girls 6–11 in ratings and delivery for Cartoon Network's Fridays programming block. During the following week, the show became the network's top-rated hit for kids 6–11. It also increased Cartoon Network's audience among that age group by 49% over the previous year.

=== Awards and nominations ===
The series has been nominated three times for the Annie Award.

Year	Result	Award	Category
2005	Nominated	Annie	Character Design in an Animated Television Production for Shakeh Haghnazarian and Lynne Naylor
2005	Nominated	Annie	Production Design in an Animated Television Production for Michael Giaimo (for first episode)
2006	Nominated	Annie	Best Production Design in an Animated Television Production for Michael Giaimo

== Merchandise ==
=== CD ===
- Hi Hi Puffy AmiYumi
- Hi Hi

=== Home media ===
In March 2022, the entire series was made available on HBO Max in Latin America. An additional web page was made available in North America as well; however, it is currently inaccessible.

Hi Hi Puffy AmiYumi home media releases
Season	Title	Release date
1	Volume 1: Let's Go!	November 29, 2005 ( (United States) )
1	Volume 1: Let's Go!	September 4, 2006 ( (Japan) )
1	Volume 2: Rock Forever!	November 29, 2005 ( (United States) )
1	Volume 2: Rock Forever!	October 30, 2006 ( (Japan) )
1	Girl Power	April 17, 2006 ( (United States) )
1	Volume 3: Team Puffy!	October 30, 2006 ( (Japan) )
1	Volume 4: Rock It Up!	October 30, 2006 ( (Japan) )
1	The Complete First Season	March 25, 2009 ( (Japan) )
2	Volume 2: Rock Forever!	November 29, 2005 ( (United States) )
2	Volume 5	June 11, 2007 ( (Japan) )
2	Volume 6	June 11, 2007 ( (Japan) )
2	Volume 7	June 11, 2007 ( (Japan) )
2	Volume 8	June 11, 2007 ( (Japan) )
2	The Complete Second Season	March 25, 2009 ( (Japan) )

=== Video games ===
There are two video games released by D3Publisher of America (D3PA) based on the show:

- Hi Hi Puffy AmiYumi: Kaznapped! (Game Boy Advance, 2005): Ami and Yumi return from a world tour and decide to take a break. Harmony hypnotizes and kidnaps Kaz, and traps Ami and Yumi onto a giant lollipop. Their cats, Jang Keng and Tekirai, lick them free, and Ami and Yumi set off on a journey to rescue Kaz. This title was developed by Altron.
- Hi Hi Puffy AmiYumi: The Genie and the Amp (Nintendo DS, 2006): Ami and Yumi are having trouble getting their creative juices flowing to lay down some tracks for their new album, only for them to find a magic genie that sends them to various time periods to collect magic notes, which are required for the girls to play the "Ultimate World Tour." This title was developed by Sensory Sweep Studios.

=== Marketing ===
- A "falloon" (a float with balloon elements) of Puffy AmiYumi's cartoon tour bus (complete with the supporting characters in puppet form), the cartoon version of Puffy AmiYumi as a balloon, and the real PUFFY appeared in the Macy's Thanksgiving Day Parade in 2005.
- A line of toys intended for girls was produced by Mattel (makers of the popular Barbie doll and Hot Wheels cars) and released for the 2005 Christmas season.
- Two DVDs, Let's Go! and Rock Forever, featuring various episodes of the show, were released on November 29, 2005.
- The American costume company Rubie's produced a line of Hi Hi Puffy AmiYumi costumes and accessories for girls for Halloween 2006.

== See also ==
- Pink Lady and Jeff, the previous attempt to import a Japanese pop group to US television.
