= Cynthia Wells =

Cynthia Wells is an American animated film maker, artist and triathlete.

== Early life and education ==
Wells, born 1956 or 1957, was raised in California. In the 1980s, she studied at the California Institute of Arts (CalArts).

== Work ==
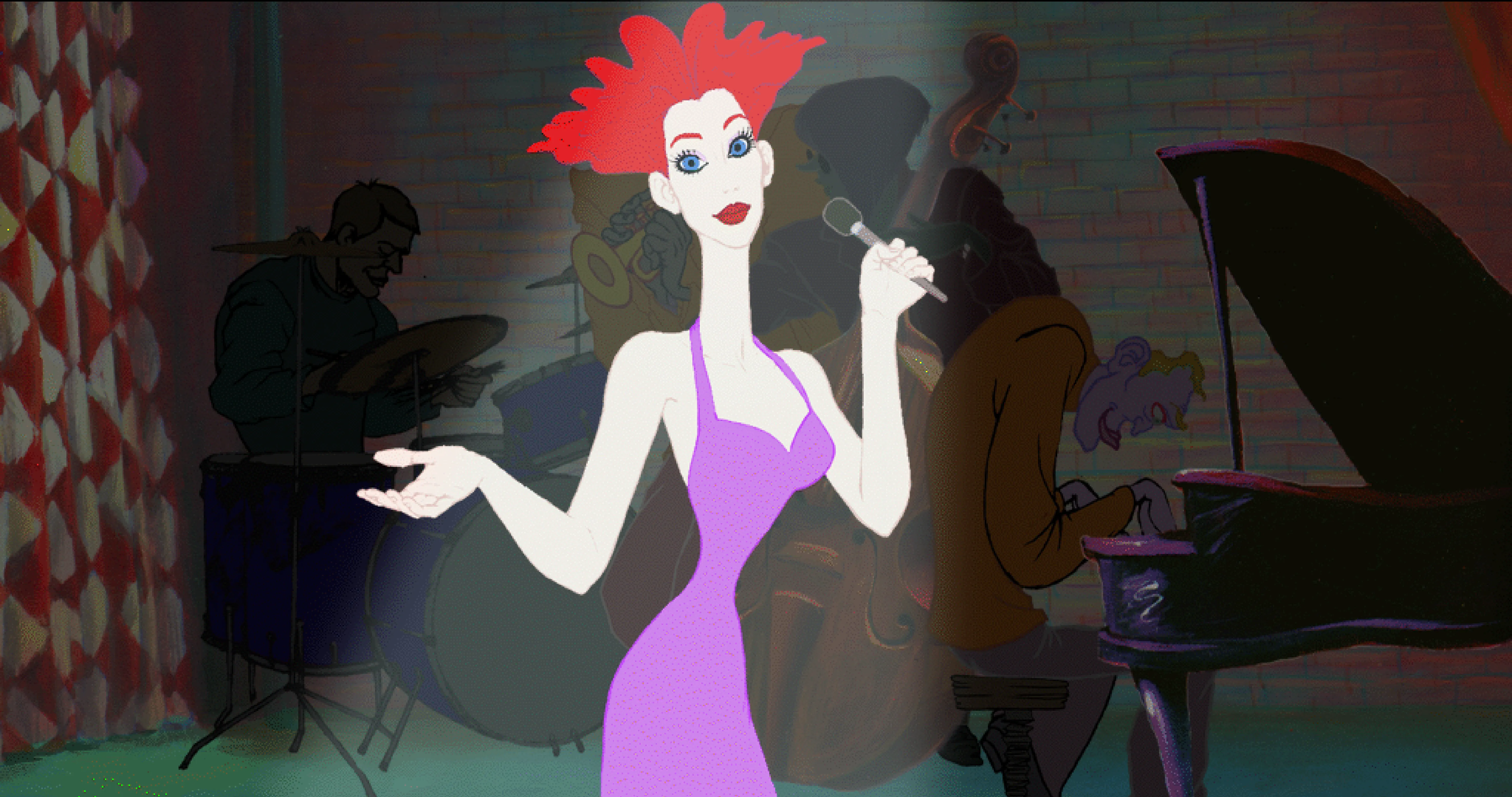
Talullah in The Shadow of Doubt

Wells has worked as a character animator, initially at Disney, and later at Warner Bros. and other studios. She was the first woman to be nominated for an Annie Award for her own 1994 animated short film Interview with Tallulah, Queen of the Universe. Wells was nominated for "Best Individual Achievement for Animation", and the film was also nominated for "Best Animated Short Subject". A follow-up, The Shadow of Doubt, which she produced with her husband, was made in 2001. Both films feature the same main character, the jazz singer Talullah. Their company, The Digital Theater Group, recruited more than a hundred people to work on the film. The Phoenix called it a "dreary psychedelic pastiche about a Paris cabaret singer that recalls Ralph Bakshi."

Her work includes the films The Fox and the Hound (1981), Space Jam (1996), Anastasia (1997) and Quest for Camelot (1998). She also worked on Ziggy's Gift (1982) and David Macaulay: Roman City (1994), both of which won Emmy-awards. She has worked with commercials and taught at CalArts.

As of 2023, she is an independent illustrator and artist. She received the Huntington Arts Council Creative Individual Grant in 2024.

== Triathlon ==
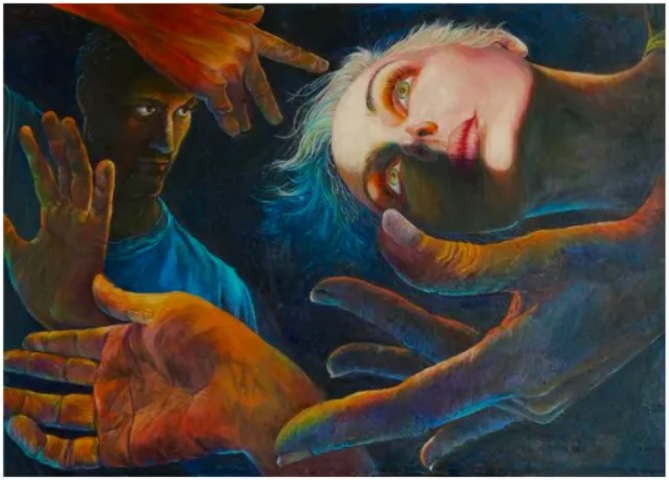
Tango, painting by Wells

Wells started running in her 50s, and competed in the New York City Marathon and New York City Half Marathon. She then switched to triathlon, and completed her first at North Fork of Long Island in 2017. She has continued to participate in the event, the Jamesport Triathlon, and has finished second in her age-group.

Triathlon has inspired her artwork, and she finds that the training helps reduce tension from painting in neck and back. She says that "After all the preparation and the energy is spent, there is space in my head that allows the creativity in."

== Personal life ==
As of 2023, she lives in New York. As of 2025, she is married to Geoffrey Wells, author and former IT manager.
