= Star Wars: Ronin: A Visions Novel =

Science fiction samurai novel written by Emma Mieko Candon

Star Wars: Rōnin: A Visions Novel
- Author: Emma Mieko Candon
- Audio read by: Joel de la Fuente
- Language: English
- Series: Star Wars: Visions
- Genre: Science fiction
- Publisher: Del Rey
- Publication date: October 12, 2021
- Publication place: United States
- Media type: Print (hardcover, e-book, audiobook
- Pages: 352
- ISBN: 978-0593358665

Rōnin, marketed as Star Wars: Rōnin: A Visions Novel, is a science fiction samurai novel written by Emma Mieko Candon and is a spin-off to the 2021 anthology series Star Wars: Visions set in an alternate history. It follows a lone, nameless wanderer only known as "Ronin" who travels the galaxy with his faithful droid while wielding a red lightsaber. The first chapter serves as a novelisation of the Visions episode "The Duel" written by Takashi Okazaki, directed by Takanobu Mizuno, and animated by Kamikaze Douga, with the remainder of the novel serving as a sequel to the episode, inspired by the works of Akira Kurosawa.

Rōnin was published on October 12, 2021.

== Premise ==
Two decades after rebellious Jedi rose up and formed the Sith order, and the ultimate downfall of the order from infighting, a former Sith warrior in a self-imposed exile wanders the galaxy while collecting red kyber crystals from Sith he has killed. After a confrontation with a bandit, Rōnin is forced to confront his old life and the endless cycle of violence he left behind.

== Marketing ==
The novel was announced six months before the release of Star Wars: Visions, advertised to let readers "forget what [they] know about Jedi and Sith." According to James Waugh, an executive producer of Visions, he felt that the episode the novel is based on, "The Duel", stuck out as the one film that was rife for a continuation through novel form with the consultation of creative producer Jumpei Mizusaki and animation studio Kamikaze Douga. Waugh said of the story and its relation to the show: "Visions allows us to explore Star Wars expressed in new ways. And this book is unlike anything we’ve done before."

== Reception ==
Dork Side of the Force wrote: "While the novel might be a harder sell for some, fans who enjoy the breadth of storytelling seen in the non-canon Legends books will certainly enjoy Candon’s avant-garde and at times mystical writing." Comic Book Resources wrote: "While it is a bit of an adjustment to understand the new lore, it is nevertheless a fascinating read from the perspective of a man who tries to use the Dark Side for altruistic purposes."

The novel was on Publishers Weekly's science fiction bestseller list by selling 8,353 units.
