= The Archive Undying =

2023 science fiction novel by Emma Mieko Candon

- Author: Emma Mieko Candon
- Language: English
- Series: The Downworld Sequence
- Release number: 1
- Genre: Science fiction
- Published: 27 Jun 2023
- Publisher: Tordotcom
- Publication place: United States
- Pages: 496 (hardcover)
- ISBN: 9781250821546

The Archive Undying is a 2023 science fiction novel by Emma Mieko Candon. It is the first novel in a planned duology entitled The Downworld Sequence.

== Plot ==
=== Premise ===
Many city-states were once ruled by artificial intelligences. AIs were treated as gods; human archivists served as their priests. Over the centuries, many AIs became corrupted and died.

The Harbor, a group of human-run city-states, creates ENGINES cobbled together from pieces of dead AIs. An ENGINE is a mech that requires both an archive and a relic to pilot it. Relics are humans who are interfaced with an AI at the time of its corruption. An archive is a copy of an AI's memories; however, an archive is not sentient and has no self-coherence, requiring a human relic to direct it.

=== Plot summary ===
Iterate Fractal is an AI and god of the city-state Khuon Mo. It is corrupted and destroys the city. Sunai is an archivist who becomes a relic as Iterate Fractal dies. He finds that after his resurrection, he is unable to age or be killed. After Iterate Fractal's death, the Harbor is unable to take complete control of Khuon Mo. They share the city with business magnate Madam Wei and her Ginger Company.

Seventeen years later, Sunai works as a salvager. He frequently indulges in alcohol, drugs, and casual sex while hiding from the Harbor. He is hired to join the crew of the salvage rig “Third Scrap”. Sunai has sex with Veyadi Lut, the rig's owner. Veyadi is one of Iterate Fractal's former archivists; Sunai worries that this indiscretion will expose his identity.

Sunai, Veyadi, and their crew explore the ruins of Chom Dan, where Veyadi served as an archivist after Iterate Fractal's death. Nearby, they discover a shrine that is home to an unknown AI. When Sunai tries to interact with the AI, it embeds itself into Sunai's mind and becomes his passenger.

Sunai reunites with Imaru, a former business partner and friend, who advises him on a potential job in Khuon Mo. The Harbor has finally found a way to create an ENGINE from Iterate Fractal's remains. Imaru wants to kill the ENGINE. Sunai and Veyadi join Imaru's rig “Never Once”, which is backed by Madam Wei. Wei plans to kill Iterate Fractal's relics whenever they are discovered; this is to prevent the Harbor from operating the ENGINE and gaining control of the city.

The party confronts Iterate Fractal's ENGINE. The ENGINE is also known as the Maw, as it tends to kill its relics accidentally. The Maw tries to assimilate Sunai, but fails and flees. The party reaches Khuon Mo. They meet Ruhi, one of Sunai's former lovers and a liaison for the Harbor. Sunai learns that Veyadi is also relic of Iterate Fractal. They are the only two surviving relics that can operate the Maw. Sunai realizes that there is no relic controlling the Maw, meaning that it is practically an independent AI. (The Harbor has kept this fact secret, as it goes against their stated anti-AI beliefs).

Imaru helps the Maw merge with Sunai. This kicks the passenger out of Sunai's brain and into Veyadi. The passenger reveals that it is the cause of all AI corruption; it was created by AI themselves as a check against their power. Ruhi has been working with the passenger; he attacks the city and tries to destroy Iterate Fractal's remaining archives. Veyadi and Sunai fight against Ruhi; Sunai bites out his throat and kills him.

Sunai and Veyadi weave the passenger into Ruhi's corpse, imprisoning it. They are both joined to the Maw, two relics sharing one ENGINE while retaining most of their individuality. They hope to keep Khuon Mo safe as the Harbor and remaining AI city-states jockey for control.

== Style ==
According to a review from Kirkus, the story contains interludes narrated by two different AIs, one of which is supposedly dead. These interludes are told in the second person. Additionally, "it's not always possible to tell who is narrating or experiencing various moments of the story, as consciousnesses merge and only incompletely separate."

== Background ==
In an interview published by LitHub, Candon wrote that the Harbor was inspired by Japanese history and her experiences as a fourth generation Japanese-American living in Hawaii. According to Candon, Japan's empire committed "incredible brutalities against China, against the Philippines, in Indonesia, all up and down the East Asian seaboard and down into Southeast Asia." At the same time, Japan's population was traumatized by the dropping of two atomic bombs on their population. In this way, Candon states that "[Japan] suffered, but is also responsible in some cultural regard for carrying the history of the brutalities it visited upon people." Candon writes that the mech genre is also tied to the trauma of World War II. In the novel, she states that "the Harbor and its original city state, all of the language that it uses, is very much Japanese adjacent". Additionally, the Harbor is "this group of people, after suffering one of these corruption events where their AI dies in a terrible way, decide we can never trust these entities again."

== Reception ==
Publishers Weekly called the novel's setting "a fascinating if sometimes disorienting world of AI gods, dissolute hermits, and fantastical biotech constructs". The review praised the "emotional thread of trauma, guilt, and grief", while noting that the "elaborate, often evasive style" would be confusing to some readers. Molly Templeton of Tor.com called the novel "immersive and glorious", giving special praise to the complexity of Sunai's role as protagonist. Templeton also wrote that "the world is so densely, incredibly imagined, and tugs the reader along so swiftly, that it can sometimes feel like The Archive Undying is the second book in a series that skipped the first." Despite this criticism, the review concludes by calling The Archive Undying "transformative, lush, and dizzying ... an auspicious start to an intriguing series." In a review for Library Journal, Erin Niederberger recommended the novel for purchase for libraries with large science fiction and fantasy collections and stated that the story would "appeal to readers who like their giant robots paired with explorations of emotional intimacy and moving forward after trauma."

A review for Kirkus called the novel "intriguing but difficult to follow". The review stated that readers may wish for more explanations, and also wrote that there is "some important point being made about the nature of sentience, but it’s not 100% clear what that point is." Writing for the New York Times, author Amal El-Mohtar stated that "undeniably avid and assured intelligence animates the story". Nonetheless, El-Mohtar called the execution "mushy and oblique", stating that "giant robot fights are indisputably cool, but it’s hard to be invested in them when you don’t know why they’re fighting or what will happen if they win or lose."
