= Hiromu Mineta =

Japanese voice actor

- 峯田 大夢
- Born: June 24, 1995 (age 31); Yamagata Prefecture, Japan
- Occupation: Voice actor
- Years active: 2014–present
- Agent: Stardust Promotion
- Notable work: Cestvs: The Roman Fighter as Cestvs; Blue Period as Yatora Yaguchi
- Height: 175 cm (5 ft 9 in)

Hiromu Mineta (Japanese: 峯田 大夢, Hepburn: Mineta Hiromu; born June 24, 1995) is a Japanese voice actor affiliated with Stardust Promotion. He is known for his roles as Cestvs in Cestvs: The Roman Fighter and Yatora Yaguchi in Blue Period.

== Biography ==
Hiromu Mineta was born in Yamagata Prefecture on June 24, 1995. Before working as a voice actor, he did cosplaying, including recreating the cover of Maid Sama! with Nogizaka46's Minami Hoshino to celebrate the release of the series' 16th volume. In 2021, Mineta received his first lead role, Cestvs in Cestvs: The Roman Fighter. He also voiced the main protagonist Yatora Yaguchi in the anime adaptation of Blue Period.

== Filmography ==
=== Animated series ===
2016

- Orange as Nakayama

2017

- Seiren as School boy
- Code: Realize − Guardian of Rebirth as Soldier

2018

- How to Keep a Mummy as Tanaka
- Tokyo Ghoul: Re as Toma Higemaru

2021

- Cestvs: The Roman Fighter as Cestvs
- Star Wars: Visions as Ethan
- Blue Period as Yatora Yaguchi

2022

- Futsal Boys!!!!! as Louis Kashiragi

2023

- Giant Beasts of Ars as Meran
- Technoroid Overmind as Kei

2024

- Wind Breaker as Minoru Kanuma
- Loner Life in Another World as Jock A

2025

- I Left My A-Rank Party to Help My Former Students Reach the Dungeon Depths! as Yuke
- Sword of the Demon Hunter: Kijin Gentōshō as Zenji

2026

- Star Wars: Visions Presents – The Ninth Jedi as Ethan

2027

- Witch and Mercenary as Alan Clows

=== Video games ===
2020

- Project Sekai: Colorful Stage! feat. Hatsune Miku as Koutaro Mita
- Ikémen Prince: Beauty and Her Beast as Rio Ortiz

2025

- The Hundred Line: Last Defense Academy as Quenzelle

TBA

- Futsal Boys!!!!! High-Five League as Louis Kashiragi

=== Other ===
2014

- Gurren Lagann stage play as Viral

2020

- Ayakashi Triangle vomic as Matsuri Kazamaki
