= Star Wars: Visions Presents =

- Promotional poster
- Genre: Action-adventure; Science fiction; Space opera
- Based on: Star Wars by George Lucas
- Written by: Mitsuyasu Sakai
- Directed by: Kenji Kamiyama; Shunsuke Tada
- Voices of: Chinatsu Akasaki; Tetsuo Kanao; Hiromu Mineta; Hinata Tadokoro; Chō; Shin-ichiro Miki
- Narrated by: Akio Otsuka
- Music by: Nobuko Toda; Kazuma Jinnouchi
- Countries of origin: United States; Japan
- Original languages: Japanese; English
- No. of series: 1
- No. of episodes: 8

Production
- Executive producers: James Waugh; Jacqui Lopez; Josh Rimes; Justin Leach; Mitsuhisa Ishikawa
- Producers: Hitoshi Itō; Kanako Shirasaki
- Cinematography: Kazuya Arahata
- Editor: Taeko Hamauzu
- Production companies: Lucasfilm; Production I.G

Original release
- Network: Disney+; Hulu
- Release: August 5, 2026

Related
- Star Wars: Visions

Star Wars: Visions Presents is a collection of American anime anthology television series created for the streaming service Disney+. It is part of the Star Wars franchise, and serves as a spinoff from Star Wars: Visions.

The first eight-episode series, subtitled The Ninth Jedi, premiered at the Anime Expo on July 1, 2026, and was released in its entirety on Disney+ and Hulu on August 5, 2026.

== Voice cast ==
=== The Ninth Jedi ===
Character name	Voice actor	
English	Japanese	English
Lah Kara	Chinatsu Akasaki	Kimiko Glenn
Juro	Tetsuo Kanao	Andrew Kishino
Ethan	Hiromu Mineta	Masi Oka
Homen	Hinata Tadokoro	Patrick Seitz
Gramps	Chō	J. P. Karliak
Lah Zhima	Shin-ichiro Miki	Simu Liu
Dunbai	Hiroshi Naka	Brent Mukai
Gennoh Ikagi	Kenji Nomura	Feodor Chin
Bhozn	Tetsu Inada	Neil Kaplan
Nawaam	Nao Ōmori	Young Mazino
Tafflah	Maaya Sakamoto	Chase Sui Wonders
Kwana	Nobuyuki Hiyama	Keone Young
Eht	Shoya Ishige	Zion Jang
Bee-Toh	Hiroki Takahashi	Aleks Le

== Episodes ==
=== The Ninth Jedi (2026) ===
No.	Title	Directed by	Written by	Original release date
1	"A New Threat"	Shunsuke Tada	Story by : Kenji Kamiyama; Teleplay by : Mitsuyasu Sakai	August 5, 2026
Kara's team is pursued by Gennoh Ikagi to the planet Makono Ko, ruled by the former Jedi Dunbai. Gennoh launches an assault on the planet's capital, but is repelled. Elsewhere, Ethan infiltrates Nawaam's mercenary army and learns that Nawaam is a Jedi.
2	"A Hidden Weapon"	Shunsuke Tada	Story by : Kenji Kamiyama; Teleplay by : Daisuke Onigashi	August 5, 2026
Kara and her companions travel to Bibin, where Juro and Zhima were trained as Jedi, to recruit miners. Juro gifts Kwana a lightsaber. At Nawaam's base, Ethan learns that Nawaam is collecting kyber crystals to create a superweapon. Upon learning of Juro's presence at Bibin, Nawaam demands that they surrender or be destroyed by the superweapon. He fires the weapon at Bibin, but the laser narrowly misses.
3	"Voice from the Past"	Shunsuke Tada	Story by : Kenji Kamiyama; Teleplay by : Yumiko Yoshizawa	August 5, 2026
Bibin begins a mass evacuation, and Ethan reports the weapon's location on Yaago to Juro. Kara gets trapped in a hanger while trying to save Tafflah. Tafflah recounts to Kara that Master Reno, who had trained Zhima and Juro, was slain by Zhima for unknown reasons, leading to the Order being dissolved. Kara and Tafflah are saved and board Reno's old ship, where they find evidence that Reno had fallen to the dark side. Juro leads Kwama's fleet to attack Yaago.
4	"Nawaam Attacks"	Shunsuke Tada	Story by : Kenji Kamiyama; Teleplay by : Mitsuyasu Sakai	August 5, 2026
Nawaam leads a pre-emptive strike at Bibin, leading his forces to board onto Kwama's flagship. Nawaam duels with Kara, revealing that he witnessed Zhima slaying Reno, which inspired him to discard his emotions and attain absolute power. Juro joins the duel, but Nawaam mortally wounds him. On Yaago, Ethan helps Zhima escape, but he stays behind after sensing Juro's death. Nawaam's forces destroy Kawam's flagship, which Kara narrowly escapes.
5	"The Storm of Violence"	Shunsuke Tada	Story by : Kenji Kamiyama; Teleplay by : Daisuke Onigashi	August 5, 2026
Nawaam continues conquering more star systems as the Jedi resistance is forced into hiding. Gennoh, having been grievously wounded by Zhima, is given a fully cyborg body. Meanwhile, Nawaam travels to Hy Izlan to find a giant Kyber crystal to complete the superweapon. Kara secludes herself on a remote forest planet to protect the lightsabers Juro entrusted to her, and annihilates the Jedi Hunters who tracked her. Her rage causes her to fall to the dark side, causing her to flee in terror. The other Jedi Hunters kidnap one of the local children, forcing the tribe to hunt Kara.
6	"Light of the Force"	Shunsuke Tada	Story by : Kenji Kamiyama; Teleplay by : Mitsuyasu Sakai	August 5, 2026
Kara surrenders herself to the Jedi Hunters Eht and Bee-toh, whom she recognizes as her father's kidnappers. In captivity, Kara has a conversation with Juro's force ghost, who reassures her that she will not fall to the dark side. Zhima raids one of Nawaam's bases and passes along information about Hy Izlan. Kara escapes upon learning that she will be used as bait for Zhima, killing Eht but sparing Bee-Toh. She employs Bee-Toh, giving him a lightsaber, which ignites blue.
7	"The Jedi Strike Back"	Shunsuke Tada	Story by : Kenji Kamiyama; Teleplay by : Mitsuyasu Sakai	August 5, 2026
The Jedi resistance attempts to intercept Nawaam at Hy Izlan. A coalition fleet led by Tafflah and Dunbai also arrives, reuniting Kara with her father. Nawaam's fleet arrives and begins extracting the giant Kyber crystal from the planet. Kwama, Dunbai, and Tafflah lead the fleet while Kara, Ethan, Homen, and Bee-Toh stay to help Zhima. Gennoh arrives with a massive battle droid and challenges Zhima to a duel. Zhima taps into his full power to kill Gennoh. Likewise, Kara manages to destroy the battle droid with all her strength. However, Gennoh's distraction allows Nawaam to seize the giant Kyber crystal.
8	"The Ninth Jedi"	Shunsuke Tada	Story by : Kenji Kamiyama; Teleplay by : Mitsuyasu Sakai	August 5, 2026
Kara and the other Jedi board Fort Dominion and split up, with Zhima heading to personally battle Nawaam while Kara leads the other Jedi to sabotage the Kyber cannon. Kwana's fleet disables Fort Dominion's engines, causing it to crash land on Hy Izlan's surface. However, Nawaam orders the cannon to be fired anyways as Kara's team breach the cannon's control room. After defeating Zhima, Nawaam duels Kara. Rejecting both the state of nothingness and the Sith desire for domination, Kara defeats Nawaam following a fierce lightsaber duel but spares his life. Ethan, Homen, Bee-Toh, and Four Nines smash the giant Kyber crystal to pieces, causing the Kyber cannon to malfunction and release a wave of blue energy that envelops Hy Izlan's asteroid belt. Now leaderless, Nawaam's forces quickly surrender, and it is revealed that Nawaam actually spared Zhima's life as well. While Kara and her friends establish a new Jedi Order on Hy Izlan, Zhima crafts a new lightsaber for the imprisoned Nawaam, but the scene cuts to black before its color can be seen.

== Production ==
=== Development ===
James Waugh announced at the April 2025 Star Wars Celebration that Star Wars: Visions would begin a standalone spin-off series to tell longer form stories that began as shorts in the anthology series. The first Star Wars: Visions Presents series is The Ninth Jedi, after the Volume 1 episode "The Ninth Jedi" (2021) and the Volume 3 continuation "The Ninth Jedi: Child of Hope" (2025), which was also announced at the Star Wars Celebration.

The Ninth Jedi series was directed by Kenji Kamiyama and written by Mitsuyasu Sakai. Around 200 people at Production I.G worked on the series. Kamiyama was initially given total creative freedom by Lucasfilm over the project, but once it became a series, they suddenly came up with unique rules and got angry at him despite his happiness at working with them while concurrently wanting to test whether what he was doing would be accepted by them, being glad that he achieved that. Nobuko Toda and Kazuma Jinnouchi composed the music.

For Lah Kara's final battle with Nawaam, Kamiyama wanted the conflict not just in terms of importance in each character as a defining moment, but as something of a beacon for the Jedi's future in the Star Wars universe, as he felt Kara could add something missing because while he didn't deny the Jedi's achievements, he perceived something stronger that could bring it a little bit forward could be added, which he did by having Kara not kill Nawaam but save his spirit through compassion and kindness, as he always told his team that heroes are personally those who bring real justice through fairness and equality, which some Jedi lacked but not Kara due to counting with the patience, resilience and strenght.

=== Casting ===
In July 2026, the voice cast was revealed for the series, with Chinatsu Akasaki, Tetsuo Kanao, Hiromu Mineta, Hinata Tadokoro, Chō, and Shin-ichiro Miki, Kimiko Glenn, Andrew Kishino, Masi Oka, Patrick Seitz, J. P. Karliak, and Simu Liu reprising their roles from the Japanese and English dubs of Visions, respectively, with Feodor Chin, Young Mazino, Chase Sui Wonders, Keone Young joining as newcomers for the English dub.

== Release ==
Star Wars: Visions Presents – The Ninth Jedi premiered at the Anime Expo on July 1, 2026, and was released in its entirety on Disney+ and Hulu on August 5, 2026, consisting of eight episodes.

== Reception ==
The review aggregator website Rotten Tomatoes reported an approval rating of 92% for The Ninth Jedi, based on 24 reviews. Metacritic, which uses a weighted average, assigned a score of 83 out of 100 for The Ninth Jedi, based on 7 critics, indicating "universal acclaim".

Jesse Schedeen, writing for IGN, praised The Ninth Jedi for being a blank slate free from the rest of Star Wars continuity and noted the superior quality of Star Wars animation work compared to its live-action work. The animation quality and the composition of 2D characters in 3D environments were praised by Rendy Jones in his review for RogerEbert.com; Jones also compared the animation quality to that of Star Wars: Clone Wars. Chase Hutchinson praised the "enrapturing animation" and how compelling the characters were in his review for The A.V. Club. Richard Eisenbeis praised the score and the use of changing lightsaber colors as a plot device in his review for Anime News Network, but felt that the supporting characters were underdeveloped and that the show was thematically shallow.
