= Star Wars: Visions =

Animated anthology series

- Title card for Volume 1
- Genre: Action-adventure; Anthology; Science fiction; Space opera
- Based on: Star Wars by George Lucas
- Countries of origin: South Korea; United States; United Kingdom; Japan; South Africa
- Original languages: Japanese; English
- No. of seasons: 3
- No. of episodes: 27

Production
- Executive producers: Jacqui Lopez; James Waugh; Josh Rimes; Justin Leach
- Producer: Kanako Shirasaki
- Animator: Various (see below)
- Running time: 13–22 minutes
- Production company: Lucasfilm

Original release
- Network: Disney+
- Release: September 22, 2021 – October 29, 2025

Star Wars: Visions is an animated anthology television series created for the American streaming service Disney+. Produced by Lucasfilm, the series consists of original animated short films set in, or inspired by, the Star Wars universe, with each episode being a self-contained narrative produced by various studios.

The first volume of nine anime short films were produced by seven Japanese animation studios: Kamikaze Douga, Studio Colorido, Geno Studio, Trigger, Kinema Citrus, Production I.G, and Science Saru, with Trigger and Science Saru producing two shorts each. The second volume expanded the series to animation studios around the world, featuring shorts from El Guiri (Spain), Cartoon Saloon (Ireland), Punkrobot (Chile), Aardman (United Kingdom), Studio Mir (South Korea), Studio La Cachette (France), 88 Pictures (India), D'art Shtajio (Japan) along with Lucasfilm (United States), and Triggerfish (South Africa/Ireland). The creators at each studio are given free rein to re-envision the ideas of Star Wars as they see fit, while receiving guidance from Lucasfilm's executive team.

The first volume was released on September 22, 2021, while the second was released on May 4, 2023. Both volumes have received critical acclaim. A third volume was released on October 29, 2025. The spin-off series Star Wars: Visions Presents was released on August 5, 2026 with The Ninth Jedi.

== Premise ==
Star Wars: Visions is a collection of animated short films presented "through the lens of the world's best anime creators" in the first volume that offers a new animated perspective on Star Wars. Created outside of the constraints of the franchise's traditional stylings, the films provide creative freedom to each director and production studio, while maintaining fidelity to the themes and emotional identity of the Star Wars saga. Additional volumes feature animation styles from various companies around the world.

== Episodes ==
Volume	Episodes	Originally released
1	9	September 22, 2021
2	9	May 4, 2023
3	9	October 29, 2025

=== Volume 1 (2021) ===
No. overall	No. in volume	Title	Directed by	Written by	Animated by	Original release date
1	1	"The Duel"; Transliteration: "Dyueru" (Japanese: デュエル)	Takanobu Mizuno	Takashi Okazaki	Kamikaze Douga	September 22, 2021
In an alternate history, 20 years after a war between the Feudal-Jedi Empire and a renegade Jedi sect called the Sith, a lone wanderer known only as the Ronin witnesses a legion of former bandit stormtroopers attempt to extort a small village. The villagers fight back but the leader of the bandits, a self-declared Dark Lord of the Sith armed with a heavily modified lightsaber, turns the tide. While his droid saves the villagers, the Ronin, a former Sith himself, lures the bandit leader into a trap and kills her. The Ronin is shown to be collecting red kyber crystals from each Sith he has killed and decides to give the bandit leader's crystal to the young village chief, citing that it can ward off evil. Cast: Ronin (Japanese: Masaki Terasoma; English: Brian Tee), Bandit Leader / Kouru (Japanese: Akeno Watanabe; English: Lucy Liu), Village Chief (Japanese: Yūko Sanpei; English: Jaden Waldman)
2	2	"Tatooine Rhapsody"; Transliteration: "Tatuīn Rapusodi" (Japanese: タトゥイーン・ラプソディ)	Taku Kimura	Yasumi Atarashi	Studio Colorido	September 22, 2021
During the Clone Wars, a Jedi Padawan named Jay attempts to escape from the war, only to stumble upon a Hutt named Gee. Gee offers to take Jay in if he becomes the lead singer of Gee's rock band, Star Waver, and Jay accepts. Years later, during the reign of the Galactic Empire, the members of Star Waver are hunted by the bounty hunter Boba Fett. Fett eventually captures Gee and reveals that Gee's relative, Jabba the Hutt, wishes to execute him due to Gee not wanting to be a part of his family's crime syndicate. Jay inspires the other members of Star Waver to go to Tatooine and attempt to save Gee; they manage to convince Jabba to let them play one more song together before Gee's execution. The song is loved by the execution's audience, and Jabba ultimately spares Gee and becomes the band's first sponsor. Cast: Jay (Japanese: Hiroyuki Yoshino; English: Joseph Gordon-Levitt), Geezer (Japanese: Kōsuke Gotō; English: Bobby Moynihan), Boba Fett (Japanese: Akio Kaneda; English: Temuera Morrison), K-344 (Japanese: Masayo Fujita; English: Shelby Young), Lan (Japanese: Anri Katsu; English: Marc Thompson)
3	3	"The Twins"; Transliteration: "Tsuinzu" (Japanese: ツインズ)	Hiroyuki Imaishi	Hiromi Wakabayashi	Studio Trigger	September 22, 2021
In the aftermath of the Battle of Exegol, the remnants of the First Order and Sith Eternal begin the construction of two conjoined Star Destroyers that house a large superlaser capable of destroying planets. Using Sith alchemy, they are also able to create two Force-sensitive biological twins named Karre and Am, who they then train in the dark side of the Force. The twins eventually become the leaders of the remnant and plan to use their superweapon to destroy the New Republic. However, Karre goes rogue on the day the weapon is supposed to be fired due to him having a vision of the future involving his sister's death; he also steals the large kyber crystal that powers the superweapon. Am confronts Karre outside of the Star Destroyers in outer space and they duel. During the battle, the crystal is split in half and Am uses a piece to power a metal exoskeleton, despite Karre's warning that he has foreseen this causing her death. Using his X-wing and the power of hyperspace, Karre is able to destroy Am's sliver of the crystal and the superlaser; he crash-lands on Tatooine and vows to rescue his sister from the dark side. Cast: Karre (Japanese: Junya Enoki; English: Neil Patrick Harris), Am (Japanese: Ryoko Shiraishi; English: Alison Brie), B-20N (Japanese: Tokuyoshi Kawashima; English: Jonathan Lipow)
4	4	"The Village Bride"; Transliteration: "Mura no Hanayome" (Japanese: 村の花嫁)	Hitoshi Haga	Takahito Oonishi & Hitoshi Haga	Kinema Citrus	September 22, 2021
On a remote planet, an explorer named Valco explains to his guest, a former Jedi Padawan named F, the connection of villagers to the planet's environment. The village chief's granddaughter Haru and her fiancé Asu have their wedding, but the next day she must surrender herself as collateral to a group of bandit raiders who have reprogrammed old Separatist battle droids to take control of the planet. Haru's sister Saku tries to fight the bandits, but just as she is about to be executed, F cuts her padawan braid, removes her mask, and declares herself a Jedi. With the aid of Valco, she intervenes and defeat the bandits and then bids farewell to the villagers and departs the planet. Cast: F (Japanese: Asami Seto; English: Karen Fukuhara), Haru (Japanese: Megumi Han; English: Nichole Sakura), Asu (Japanese: Yuma Uchida; English: Christopher Sean), Valco (Japanese: Takaya Kamikawa; English: Cary-Hiroyuki Tagawa), Izuma (Japanese: Yoshimitsu Shimoyama; English: Andrew Kishino), Saku (Japanese: Mariya Ise; English: Stephanie Sheh)
5	5	"The Ninth Jedi"; Transliteration: "Kyūninme no Jedai" (Japanese: 九人目のジェダイ)	Kenji Kamiyama	Kenji Kamiyama	Production I.G	September 22, 2021
Many generations after the Jedi Order becomes almost extinct, Margrave Juro, ruler of the planet Hy Izlan, invites seven Jedi to his aerial temple to receive lightsabers made with kyber crystals from his planet. Meanwhile, on the planet below, the sabersmith Lah Zhima finishes constructing another six lightsabers, including another one for his Force-sensitive daughter, Kara. She flees with the remaining lightsabers just as he is captured by hunters working for the Sith. Juro's droid gifts the first lightsaber to one of the Jedi, Ethan, and promises that the others will arrive shortly. Kara arrives at the temple and presents the lightsabers to the other six Jedi, who reveal themselves as Sith imposters intending to kill Juro and any surviving Jedi. Juro emerges from hiding within his droid and together, he, Kara and Ethan succeed in killing five of the Sith. The last remaining one, Homen, is spared as he confesses to having been a Jedi survivor corrupted by the imposters' influence. Ethan, Kara, and Homen join Juro's new Jedi Order and prepare to rescue Lah Zhima, who is being held on a Sith-controlled planet. Cast: Lah Kara (Japanese: Chinatsu Akasaki; English: Kimiko Glenn), Margrave Juro (Japanese: Tetsuo Kanao; English: Andrew Kishino), Homen (Japanese: Hinata Tadokoro; English: Patrick Seitz), Lah Zhima (Japanese: Shin-ichiro Miki; English: Simu Liu), Ethan (Japanese: Hiromu Mineta; English: Masi Oka), Roden (Japanese: Kazuya Nakai; English: Greg Chun), Niizo (Japanese: Rina Satō; English: Eva Kaminsky), Narrator (Japanese: Akio Ōtsuka; English: Neil Kaplan), Hen Jin (Japanese: Daisuke Hirakawa; English: Michael Sinterniklaas), Hanbei (Japanese: Jin Urayama; English: Adam Sietz), Toguro (Japanese: Ryota Takeuchi; English: Kyle McCarley)
6	6	"T0-B1" (Japanese: T0-B1)	Abel Góngora	Yuichiro Kido	Science SARU	September 22, 2021
Shortly after the Great Jedi Purge, a droid named T0-B1 (Tobi) lives on a deserted planet with his armless creator Professor Mitaka, and dreams of becoming a Jedi Knight. One day, Mitaka tells him that in order to become a Jedi, he must find a kyber crystal so he can forge a lightsaber. T0-B1 scours the planet, but finds nothing. He defies Mitaka's orders to never enter his basement, discovers a starship, and accidentally sends a signal that alerts a Sith Inquisitor to their presence. Mitaka reveals himself to be a former Jedi and hides both T0-B1 and his old lightsaber hilt. When T0-B1 leaves his hiding spot, he discovers that the Inquisitor has ransacked Mitaka's lab and killed him. T0-B1 continues his research and successfully terraforms the planet, but is confronted by the Inquisitor. Upon fixing Mitaka's lightsaber, T0-B1 is revealed to be powered by a kyber crystal and designed by Mitaka to be able to wield the Force, and igniting the lightsaber, kills the Inquisitor in a duel. He then departs the planet to explore the galaxy and uphold Mitaka's legacy. Cast: T0-B1 (Japanese: Masako Nozawa; English: Jaden Waldman), Mitaka (Japanese: Tsutomu Isobe; English: Kyle Chandler)
7	7	"The Elder"; Transliteration: "Erudā" (Japanese: エルダー)	Masahiko Otsuka	Masahiko Otsuka	Studio Trigger	September 22, 2021
Centuries after the death of Darth Bane and the initial extinction of the Sith, Jedi Tajin and his Padawan Dan are sent to explore the Outer Rim when Tajin senses a disturbance in the force. They land on an isolated planet and arrive at a remote village, where they learn of a mysterious elder visitor who hiked to the mountaintop. Dan follows the Elder's trail and meets the man, who reveals himself to be a former Sith who left the order before it fell apart. The Elder wounds Dan, and Tajin arrives to fight the Elder. Tajin narrowly manages to kill the Elder, who detonates an explosion which destroys his ship as he decomposes into a rocky sediment and dies so all evidence is destroyed. As they leave the village upon Dan's recovery, Tajin tells Dan that being a Jedi means being kindhearted so they do not end up like the Elder. Cast: Tajin Crosser (Japanese: Takaya Hashi; English: David Harbour), The Elder (Japanese: Kenichi Ogata; English: James Hong), Dan G'vash (Japanese: Yuichi Nakamura; English: Jordan Fisher)
8	8	"Lop and Ochō"; Transliteration: "Norausa Roppu to Hizakura Ochō" (Japanese: のらうさロップと緋桜お蝶)	Yuki Igarashi	Sayawaka	Geno Studio	September 22, 2021
During the reign of the Empire, a rabbit-like alien slave named Lop escapes her captors on the planet Tau. She is discovered by the planet's clan leader Yasaburo and his daughter Ochō, who convinces her father to adopt Lop as his daughter. Seven years later, the Empire has occupied their planet and is exploiting its natural resources. Yasaburo wants to drive the Empire off their planet, while Ochō wants to cooperate with the Empire. Ochō enlists in the Imperial navy despite her father and Lop's protests. With Ochō gone, Yasaburo gives her the family treasure, an ancient lightsaber passed down through the generations. Ochō blinds her father Yasaburo in a duel, then the Force-sensitive Lop confronts Ochō and injures her. forcing her to flee. Lop then vows to bring Ochō back home. Cast: Lop (Japanese: Seiran Kobayashi; English: Anna Cathcart), Ochō (Japanese: Risa Shimizu; English: Hiromi Dames), Yasaburo (Japanese: Tadahisa Fujimura; English: Paul Nakauchi), Imperial Officer (Japanese: Taisuke Nakano; English: Kyle McCarley)
9	9	"Akakiri" (Japanese: 赤霧)	Eunyoung Choi	Yuichiro Kido	Science SARU	September 22, 2021
Prior to the initial extinction of the Sith, a Jedi named Tsubaki has been haunted by visions of an unidentified individual dying in front of him. He reunites with his old love Misa, a princess who has been overthrown by her aunt, Masago, who has embraced the dark side. With the aid of guides Senshuu and Kamahachi, Tsubaki and Misa make their way to the royal palace. Masago captures Tsubaki's friends and overpowers him, then offers him a place as her apprentice. When Tsubaki refuses, Masago's masked henchmen attack him, but Tsubaki retaliates and kills them, also accidentally killing Misa whom Masago had dressed in their uniform - as he had foreseen. Completely broken, Tsubaki agrees to join Masago, forming a dyad to return Misa to life, before he departs with Masago. Cast: Tsubaki (Japanese: Yu Miyazaki; English: Henry Golding), Misa (Japanese: Lynn; English: Jamie Chung), Senshuu (Japanese: Chō; English: George Takei), Kamahachi (Japanese: Wataru Takagi; English: Keone Young), Masago (Japanese: Yukari Nozawa; English: Lorraine Toussaint)

=== Volume 2 (2023) ===
No. overall	No. in volume	Title	Directed by	Written by	Animated by	Original release date
10	1	"Sith"	Rodrigo Blaas	Rodrigo Blaas	El Guiri	May 4, 2023
As the Sith remain in hiding during the reign of the High Republic, Lola, a former Sith apprentice, lives in solitude on a desolate planet with her droid E2 and is trying to channel the Force into painting her base. However, despite her efforts, the paint keeps forming dark smudges that don't go away. While investigating a droid that crashed on the planet, she is suddenly visited by her former Sith Master who chases her down to her base with two droids and forces her to fight him. Inside, he insists that she is to become the new Sith Master by killing him, enforcing the Rule of Two. Lola comes to the realization that she needs to accept both light and dark halves and promptly kills the Sith Master when her double-edged lightsaber produces one yellow and one red blade, with him telling her "You are the Sith Master now." before crumbling to dust. Now in control of her own destiny, calling herself simply "the Master", Lola finishes the painting and leaves the planet with E2. Cast: Lola (Úrsula Corberó), Sith Master (Luis Tosar)
11	2	"Screecher's Reach"	Paul Young	Will Collins & Jason Tammemägi	Cartoon Saloon	May 4, 2023
Prior to the initial extinction of the Sith, a young girl named Daal lives in a workhouse with her friends Baython, Quinn, and Keena. Tired of living there, Daal convinces her friends to head out to Screecher's Reach, a remote cave, with her by stealing some land speed vehicles. The cave is rumored to hold a ghost within its walls, and the friends are eager to find it. Throughout the journey, Daal is motivated by an unusual necklace she carries. They find the cave and run into the Ghost, who turns out to be an elderly Sith apprentice woman that has been trapped inside. Daal has her friends run away, then using the force, she crushes the Ghost with a boulder and then finishes her off with her own lightsaber. After Daal escapes the cave, the necklace is revealed to be a communicator to a Sith Lord called the Sith Mother, who had given Daal the task to finish off her own apprentice and take her place by the Mother's side in exchange for refuge from the sweat shop. Despite Daal's efforts, the Sith Mother refuses to also take her friends, leaving them feeling betrayed. As Daal reluctantly leaves, she looks back at her friends one last time. Cast: Daal (Eva Whittaker), Baython (Alex Connolly), Quinn (Noah Rafferty), Keena (Molly McCann), Sith Mother (Anjelica Huston), Ghost (Niamh Moyles)
12	3	"In the Stars"	Gabriel Osorio	Gabriel Osorio	Punkrobot	May 4, 2023
During the reign of the Empire, two sisters, Koten and Tichina, are the last of their kind after the Empire conquered their planet and committed genocide on their species. Their mother, a Force-sensitive, led a failed rebellion against the Empire, who have created a factory that took their clean water; she was killed in the resulting conflict, and the factory has since caused severe light pollution as well as water pollution for the sea. While Tichina is convinced that they can defeat them with the Force, the elder and jaded Koten is solely focused on keeping them both alive. After they run out of water, Koten is forced to sneak into the factory to take water from the factory's water purifiers. However, Tichina follows her inside and gets spotted by the Stormtroopers. Exposed, Koten and Tichina attempt to flee, but Tichina runs back inside, intending to destroy the primary water tank with the Force and with it the base. Subsequently caught, she is nearly executed, but Koten awakens her own Force abilities to save her sister and together, they destroy the factory and flood everyone within. As the sisters happily embrace, they see that life is returning to the planet and their mother, who they believe is a star, looks down on them. Cast: Koten (Valentina Muhr), Tichina (Julia Oviedo), Officer (English: Kate Dickie, Latin American Spanish: Amparo Noguera)
13	4	"I Am Your Mother"	Magdalena Osinska	Story by : Magdalena Osinsaka; Teleplay by : Holly Walsh & Barunka O'Shaughnessy	Aardman	May 4, 2023
Some years after the defeat of the Empire, Wedge Antilles has formed a Flight Academy for new pilots. One of the cadets, a Twi'lek named Anni Kalfus, was inspired to become a pilot by her single mother Kalina but has since come to find her coddling and embarrassing; consequently, she neglects to tell her about a starship racing event from the Flight Academy where families compete against each other. Anni is also picked on by fellow student Julan Van Reeple, whose mother Dorota, pilots a much more sophisticated ship. When Kalina suddenly shows up to return Anni's lunch, she learns of the race and is egged on by the Van Reeples when they insult her ship. During the race, Anni admits to her mother that she embarrasses her, but she takes in stride and has her win the race for them, defeating the Van Reeples. Anni apologizes for what she said, but Kalina tells her that embarrassing her is what moms do best. During credits, Wedge is heard over the announcement selling his merchandise, claiming that all profits go to a "pilot-specific veteran support fund". Cast: Kalina Kalfus (Maxine Peake), Annisoukaline "Anni" Kalfus (Charithra Chandran), Dorota Van Reeple (Daisy Haggard), Julan Van Reeple (Bebe Cave), Wedge Antilles (Denis Lawson), the robot cooker from the Wallace and Gromit short A Grand Day Out appears as a background character
14	5	"Journey to the Dark Head" (Korean: 어둠의 머리를 벨 수 있다면)	Hyeong Geun Park	Chung Se Rang	Studio Mir	May 4, 2023
During the initial war between the Jedi and Sith, an adolescent monk named Ara believes that the statues on her home planet, whose stones around its base have foretelling abilities, control both light and dark, as one is lit in blue light and the other in red. She resolves to destroy the dark head in the belief it can turn the tide of the war. Years later, Ara, now a teenage mechanic, requests the Jedi Council for a bodyguard on her quest; they assign a young Padawan named Toul to the task. Toul has recently lost his Master at the hands of a sadistic Sith Lord, Bichan, leaving him traumatized and in constant fear. The two of them collect supplies and head to the planet where Bichan chases them. They make it to the statues, but Ara realizes that both light and dark evenly flow between them, making it impossible to destroy. Toul overcomes his fear and with Ara's help manages to kill Bichan. The two of them decide to continue journeying together. Cast: Ara (Korean: Jang Ye Na; English: Ashley Park), Toul (Korean: Lee Kyung Tae; English Eugene Lee Yang), Bichan (Korean: Yun Yong Sik; English: Daniel Dae Kim), Interpreter (Korean: Chwang Kwang; English: Albert Kong), Master Leesagum and Shopkeeper (Korean: Shin Young Woo; English: Greg Chun), Training Partner (Korean: Lim Chae Hon; English: Greg Chun), Master Duta (Korean: Choi Soo Min; English: Jonella Landry), Master Moru (Korean: Lee So Young; English: Judy Alice Lee)
15	6	"The Spy Dancer"	Julien Chheng	Julien Chheng	Studio La Cachette	May 4, 2023
Around twenty years after the formation of the Empire, a group of aliens with heterochromia and small horns run a high class club which is frequented by stormtroopers. It is revealed that the club's primary dancer, Loi'e, leads a faction of the Rebel Alliance that consists of the rest of her staff, and she places trackers on the stormtroopers' armor during her dance performances. One night, she spots a familiar looking officer and in flashback it is revealed that, twenty years prior, her infant child was taken from her by the supposed officer. Against her allies' wishes, she plans to kill the officer, only to realize that it is her child now fully grown and integrated into the Empire. As her group battles through the soldiers and the officer's KX-series droid, Loi'e takes the officer to the roof and offers proof that he is indeed her child, leaving him confused. The club's maitre'd, Hétis, helps Loi'e escape. Loi'e reveals that she left him a holo-device of him as an infant, which itself has a tracker on it. The officer views the hologram, and uncovers his severed horns. Cast: Loi'e (Camille Cottin), Jon (Lambert Wilson), Hétis (Kaycie Chase), The Officer (Rudi-James Jephcott), Mee'ma (Barbara Weber-Scaff), Additional voices (Bruce Edward Sheffield), Additional voices (Taylor Gasman)
16	7	"The Bandits of Golak"	Ishan Shukla	Ishan Shukla	88 Pictures	May 4, 2023
During the Galactic Civil War, Charuk and Rani are siblings that were forced to flee their home and are headed to the city of Golak for refuge. Rani is being targeted because she is Force-sensitive which Charuk desperately tries to hide and are nearly caught when on the train ride to Golak, only to be saved when a Rebel group called the Jangoris attack the Stormtrooper-guarded train. They eventually make it to a small oasis setting run by an elderly woman named Rugal, but an Inquisitor arrives, knowing of Rani and the incident on the train. After tricking the siblings into exposing themselves, the Inquisitor attempts to kill them, but Rugal - revealed to be an Order 66-surviving Jedi - evacuates the area with her powers and fatally defeats the Inquisitor in an intense lightsaber duel. Afterwards, Rugal tells Rani that she must come with her through a tunnel to keep her hidden with other Force-sensitives, but leave Charuk behind. The siblings have a tearful parting with Charuk giving Rani a jalebi-shaped lollipop and Rani giving Charuk their father's flute to remember her by. Cast: Charuk (Suraj Sharma), Rani (Sonal Kaushal), Inquisitor (Neeraj Kabi), Rugal (Lillete Dubey), Maghadi and Scavenger (Sahil Vaid), Conductor, Jangori Leader, and Dhoona (Sumanto Ray), Helper (Rajeev Raj), Stormtrooper (Aviral Kumar), Stormtrooper and Alien (Ish Thakkar), Stormtrooper and Alien (Additya Sharma), Crowd (Shivani Darbari)
17	8	"The Pit"	LeAndre Thomas and Justin Ridge	LeAndre Thomas	D'Art Shtajio and Lucasfilm	May 4, 2023
Just after the Empire is conquered, a large group of Imperial slaves are forced to dig a giant pit in the middle of the desert for kyber crystals, which the Stormtroopers use to build a nearby city. After years of digging, they hit the bottom, only for the Stormtroopers to completely abandon them in the deep pit. One of them, Crux, tells his daughter Livy that he will escape the pit and ask help from a nearby city. He successfully does so and manages to get the attention of the citizens of the clean futuristic city, but Stormtroopers stun him and drag him back to the pit, tossing him to his death. Livy inspires everyone in the pit to chant "follow the light", which echoes to the people of the city. They overpower the stormtroopers and rescue the people from the pit. As they leave, Livy is revealed to have kept a kyber crystal which responds to her touch, revealing she is Force-sensitive. Cast: Crux (Daveed Diggs), Eureka (Anika Noni Rose), Livy (Jordyn Curet), Old Prisoner (Cedric Yarbrough), Commander (Steven Blum), Stormtroopers (Matthew Wood)
18	9	"Aau's Song"	Nadia Darries and Daniel Clarke	Nadia Darries and Daniel Clarke	Triggerfish	May 4, 2023
Not long after the initial extinction of the Sith, the people of the mountain planet Korba are helping the Jedi purify the kyber crystals, which have been bled by the Sith. A young native girl named Aau seems to have an unusual effect on the crystals when she sings. Her father, Abat, is trying to help a Jedi named Kratu with finding a way to heal the crystals, but warns Aau that her singing is dangerous. While Abat is in the mines, Aau discovers another cave entrance with crystals and begins to sing, only for Abat to interrupt her, causing the caves to react violently. Kratu attempts to save them, but Aau realizes what she must do and sings again, which manages to finally purify the crystals. Kratu reveals that Aau must come with her to fulfill her destiny as she and Abat have a tearful goodbye. Cast: Aau (Mpilo Jantjie), Aau's Singing (Dineo Du Toit), Abat (Tumisho Masha), Kratu (Cynthia Erivo), Attu (Faith Baloyi)

=== Volume 3 (2025) ===
No. overall	No. in volume	Title	Directed by	Written by	Animated by	Original release date
19	1	"The Duel: Payback"	Takanobu Mizuno	Jumpei Mizusaki	Kamikaze Douga and ANIMA	October 29, 2025
In this sequel to "The Duel," the Grand Master, the leader of a breakaway Jedi sect known as the Crusaders, hunts down the Ronin, seeking revenge against the Sith renegade for inflicting injuries that left him a cyborg. While visiting a gambling hall built into two modified AT-AT walkers, the Ronin and his droid R5-D56 are attacked by several Yakuza troopers led by the Twi'lek Sith Aneé-san, who works for the Anzellan proprietor Que-Dama. Their duel is interrupted by the arrival of a fleet led by the Grand Master, who destroys the gambling hall. The Ronin and Aneé-san survive the duel with the Grand Master but are both wounded. After being rescued by Ewoks, the two enter a truce and join forces with Que-Dama and the Ewoks to lure the Crusaders into a trap. During the battle, the allies inflict heavy casualties on the Jedi Crusaders. Though the Grand Master gains the upper hand over the Ronin in a lightsaber duel, the cyborg is slain by Aneé-san. Following a farewell by Que-Dama, the Ronin and Aneé-san resume hostilities.
20	2	"The Song of Four Wings"; Transliteration: "Yonmaibane no Uta" (Japanese: 四枚羽の詩)	Hiroyasu Kobayashi	Yoji Enokido	Project Studio Q	October 29, 2025
Princess Crane and her astromech droid R9-TR2 ("Tor-Tu") are survivors of a lost kingdom that was destroyed by the Empire. They join rebel forces led by the Mon Calamari Admiral Basil Kiucee, who operate on the snowy world of Joetz. During a routine patrol, Crane and "Tor-Tu" stumble upon a village that was attacked and its inhabitants massacred by Imperial snowtroopers. They rescue a Gigoran child named Woopas. After escaping snowtroopers, Crane and Tor-Tu attack a modified Imperial sandcrawler, that was mining the planet for coaxium, and its AT-AT escorts. During the skirmish, Tor-Tu transforms into an X-wing mech unit but his cannon malfunctions. Woopas uses the Force to reconnect the cannon. Following the battle, Crane deduces that Woopas is Force-sensitive after seeing him levitate an origami crane.
21	3	"The Ninth Jedi: Child of Hope"	Naoyoshi Shiotani	Naoyoshi Shiotani	Production I.G	October 29, 2025
Following the events of "The Ninth Jedi," Lah Kara and her Jedi allies Ethan, Margrave Juro, Homen and the droid 99-99 embark on a mission to find Kara's kidnapped father Lah Zhima. While being pursued by the bounty hunters Anda and Unda, Kara is separated from the others after the Jedi ship is hit by a laser blast. Sucked into space, Kara is rescued by the service droid Teto, whose master's starship was stranded centuries ago in a remote asteroid field. Kara helps Teto to reach his late master, who perished centuries earlier. Out of gratitude to Kara, Teto offers his services to her. When Anda and Unda board the starship, Kara and Teto join forces to fight the hunters and their grunts. Outmatched by the hunters, Teto jettisons Kara in an escape pod and sacrifices himself by detonating his late master's starship, taking out the bounty hunters. Kara is rescued by her Jedi comrades, with Juro deducing that the mysterious Nawaan was behind the bandits who kidnapped Kara's father. Kara mourns for her fallen droid friend Teto.
22	4	"The Bounty Hunters"	Junichi Yamamoto	Hiroshi Seko	Wit Studio	October 29, 2025
The orphan girl Sevn was raised by the assassin group known as Basham. However, she left the group after a Jedi spared her and Basham got covinced the girl was a traitor. Sevn travels with the modified medical droid IV-4A on the starship Sand Bird, plying a living as bounty hunters. After escaping several Basham assassins, the duo are hired by the seemingly benevolent industrialist Jin-Sim Canbelon to hunt a group of insurgents. The two bounty hunters quickly discover that the insurgents are seeking to free their enslaved siblings. Sevn helps the insurgents but IV-4A angrily leaves due to his resentment at Sevn delaying the removal of his assassin programming. Sevn fights Jin-Sim, who dons a droideka mech unit. IV-4A experiences a change of heart after discovering that Sevn was seeking help to remove his assassin programming. Together the two defeat Jin-Sim and help the insurgents free the enslaved child workers. Together, Sevn and IV-4A resume their adventures.
23	5	"Yuko's Treasure"; Transliteration: "Yuko no Takaramono" (Japanese: ユコの宝物)	Masaki Tachibana	Natsuko Takahashi & Mika Tanaka	Kinema Citrus	October 29, 2025
Following the death of his spacer parents, Yuko is raised by his bear-like droid BILY on a homestead on Tatooine. While BILY visits Mos Eisley to sell water to Jawas, he draws the attention of a young boy named Sola, who is part of a pirate gang led by the menacing Fox-Ear. Believing that BILY holds the key to a treasure hidden by Yuko's parents, Fox-Ear and his gang raid Yuko's homestead and kidnap BILY. Sola joins forces with Yuko and his triangle droid to rescue BILY, who has been taken to an underground cave network that leads to Yuko's parents' secret base. The pirates unleash a reprogrammed BILY, who attacks Sola and Yuko. The pirates are driven down an abyss by a rampaging krayt dragon. Following a struggle with the boys, BILY reverts to his original programming and leads the boys to Yuko's parents' underground sanctuary. He reveals that his parents' treasure was a starship, which they intended to pass down to him. BILY gives Yuko and Sola their first flying lesson.
24	6	"The Lost Ones"; Transliteration: "Samayō Mono-tachi" (Japanese: 彷徨う者たち)	Hitoshi Haga	Takahito Oonishi & Hitoshi Haga	Kinema Citrus	October 29, 2025
Following the events of "The Village Bride," the former Jedi Padawan F rescues two refugees named Ron and Theo from a quake on the planet Inoli, a former mining world ravaged by carbonite gas. Ron is the leader of a group of Inoli refugees who have been experimenting with carbonite gas. The Inoli refugees bring F aboard their refugee ship, where she befriends the local children. She also has one of her prosthetic legs repaired by the Besalisk cyberneticist Joona. When an Imperial Star Destroyer arrives, F surrenders herself to save the refugees. Ron pretends to hand her over to the Empire but sabotages the Star Destroyer's engine room with carbonite bombs with the help of his droid Lulu. F is taken to meet her former Jedi Master Zero, who was resurrected from the dead and has fallen to the dark side. He attempts to recruit F to the dark side but she refuses. During a duel, F is seriously wounded but manages to incapacitate her master with a carbon bomb. Ron's carbon bombs cripple the Star Destroyer, allowing the refugee ship to escape. Ron rescues F and together they escape into hyperspace aboard Ron's ship.
25	7	"The Smuggler"	Masahiko Otsuka	Masahiko Otsuka	Studio Trigger	October 29, 2025
As punishment for speaking out against Imperial rule, the Galactic Empire imprisoned the Zenarita royal family and imposed a puppet regime on the planet Zenarita. However, Prince Arluu evades capture with the help of a female Jedi named Gleenu, who survived the Jedi Purge. The two recruit a struggling smuggler named Chita to smuggle them offworld by helping her cover the costs of repairing her starship. After stopping two stormtroopers from arresting two young men, Arluu reveals his identity to Chita. Chita, Arluu and Gleenu escape Imperial forces and a masked bounty hunter on a landspeeder and reach Chita's starship. With the help of Arluu, Chita evades TIE fighters, the bounty hunter's ship and a Star Destroyer. Reaching space, they flee to the rebel base on Yavin 4. There, a grateful Arluu enlists Chita and Gleenu's help in liberating his homeworld of Zenarita from Imperial rule.
26	8	"The Bird of Paradise"; Transliteration: "Gokurakuchō no Hana" (Japanese: 極楽鳥の花)	Tadahiro Yoshihira	Tadahiro Yoshihira & Makoto Uezu	Polygon Pictures	October 29, 2025
The Jedi Padawan Nakime is blinded during a duel with the Sith Aman and falls into a pit. After encountering a statue, she experiences a vision and is led by green lights in the forest. For the next five days, Nakime experiences various physical, mental and spiritual trials while grappling with hunger, loneliness, despair, fear and anger. She is also tormented by an apparition of Aman, who implores her to give into the dark side. On the fifth day, she encounters a talking toad, who teaches about her about letting the Force guide her. During her final trial, Nakime fights Aman and realizes that Aman is the embodiment of her immaturity, impulsiveness, ego and fear of death. Rejecting these feelings, she overcomes Aman by submitting to the will of the Force. Having made peace with her emotions and fears, Nakime awakes and regains her sight.
27	9	"BLACK"	Shinya Ohira	Shinya Ohira	David Production	October 29, 2025
A psychedelic story consisting of a montage of shots and visions from the point of view of an Imperial stormtrooper experiencing defeat during the Battle of Endor. While dodging falling debris amidst the destruction of the second Death Star, a stormtrooper is haunted by visions of his past. He also grapples with another stormtrooper through various landscapes and scenarios. The stormtrooper survives the ordeal, albeit bruised, battered and haunted.

== Production ==
=== Development ===
Development of the Star Wars: Visions project began when James Waugh, vice president of franchise content at Lucasfilm, pitched the idea to Kathleen Kennedy at the beginning of 2020. To facilitate the international production, Lucasfilm collaborated with independent producer Justin Leach and his company Qubic Pictures, which helped facilitate the discussions between the US-based executives and Japanese studios; this became particularly important during the COVID-19 pandemic, when planned in-person collaborative meetings had to be canceled. Production of the shorts took place in Japan throughout 2020 and 2021.

On December 10, 2020, it was announced that Star Wars: Visions was an anime anthology series of ten short films by different Japan animation studios set in the Star Wars universe. It was previewed by producer Kanako Shirasaki and the executive producers at Anime Expo Lite in July 2021. At the event, it was revealed that the number of episodes had decreased from ten to nine, due to "The Ninth Jedi" originally starting development as two episodes, but was eventually combined into one episode. The animation studios creating shorts for the first volume are Kamikaze Douga, Studio Colorido, Geno Studio, Trigger, Kinema Citrus, Production I.G, and Science Saru.

A second season of Visions was announced at Star Wars Celebration in May 2022, to include shorts from studios based in numerous countries in addition to Japan. Waugh described the second volume as "a celebration of the incredible animation happening all around the globe". The animation studios for the second volume are El Guiri (Spain), Cartoon Saloon (Ireland), Punkrobot (Chile), Aardman (United Kingdom), Studio Mir (South Korea), Studio La Cachette (France), 88 Pictures (India), D'Art Shtaijo (Japan), and Triggerfish (South Africa); D'Art Shtaijo's was also co-produced with Lucasfilm. The second volume was released on May 4, 2023.

A third season of Visions was announced during Disney's Content Showcase event on November 19, 2024. The third volume returns to focusing exclusively on anime studios: David Production, Kamikaze Douga, Trigger, Kinema Citrus, Polygon Pictures, Project Studio Q, Production I.G, and Wit Studio. The third volume was released on October 29, 2025.

=== Writing ===
We really wanted to give these creators a wide creative berth to explore all the imaginative potential of the Star Wars galaxy through the unique lens of anime. We realized we wanted these to be as authentic as possible to the studios and creators who are making them, made through their unique process, in a medium they're such experts at. So the idea was, this is their vision riffing off all the elements of the Star Wars galaxy that inspired them — hopefully to make a really incredible anthology series, unlike anything we've seen before in the Star Wars galaxy.

— James Waugh on the creative freedom for Visions.

Star Wars: Visions's stories were not required to adhere to the established Star Wars timeline. The story of "The Duel" was specifically billed as "an alternate history pulled from Japanese lore". "Lop and Ochō" is set during the reign of the Galactic Empire between Revenge of the Sith and A New Hope. "The Elder" is set "sometime before" The Phantom Menace while "The Twins" involves "remnants of the Imperial Army" after the events of The Rise of Skywalker. "The Ninth Jedi" explores "what became of the Jedi Knights" after The Rise of Skywalker; director Kenji Kamiyama was particularly focused on wanting to use "the original lightsaber sounds" that are known to children throughout the world. For "T0-B1", director Abel Góngora sought to combine visual and narrative elements of the classic trilogy with those of classic anime by drawing parallels between the anime and manga of the 1960s, and the cinema tradition of the late 1970s. In planning her episode "Akakiri", director Eunyoung Choi noted that "creating visuals that combined both the fairy tale-style lessons of Star Wars with the advanced technology found in this universe... was particularly important."

=== Music ===
In July 2021, the Vol.1 composers were revealed: Kevin Penkin would be composing the score for "The Village Bride", Michiru Ōshima for "The Twins" and "The Elder", while Yoshiaka Dewa would compose the score for "Lop and Ochō" and "Tatooine Rhapsody", Keiji Inai to compose the score for "The Duel", A-bee and Keiichiro Shibuya to compose the score for "T0-B1", U-zhaan to compose the score for "Akakiri", and Nobuko Toda and Kazuma Jinnouchi would be composing the score for "The Ninth Jedi". Soundtracks for Volume 1 were each released digitally on October 15, 2021. In May 2023, the Vol.2 composers were revealed. They included Dan Levy for "Sith", Leo Pearson for "Screecher's Reach", Andrés Walker & Patricio Portius for "In the Stars", Jean-Marc Petsas for "I Am Your Mother", Jang Young Gyu & Lee Byung-Hoon for "Journey to the Dark Head", Olivier Derivière for "The Spy Dancer", Sneha Khanwalkar for "The Bandits of Golak", Daniel Lopatin for "The Pit", and Markus Wormstorm for "Aau's Song". Soundtracks for Volume 2 were each released digitally on May 4, 2023 where the volume was also released.

==== Volume 1 (2021) ====
All music is composed by Keiji Inai

Star Wars: Visions – The Duel (Original Soundtrack)
No.	Title	Length
1.	"Ronin's Theme"	3:47
2.	"SIgn of deaTH"	1:52
3.	"The Duel"	3:48
4.	"May The Force Be With You"	2:01

All music is composed by Yoshiaki Dewa

Star Wars: Visions – Tatooine Rhapsody (Original Soundtrack)
No.	Title	Length
1.	"Order 66"	0:36
2.	"Galactic Dreamer"	2:04
3.	"Star Waver"	0:53
4.	"Boba Fett Chase"	0:34
5.	"Encounter"	0:38
6.	"Mos Espa Grand Aren"	1:21
7.	"Tatooine Rhapsody"	1:18
8.	"Galactic Dreamer (Instrumental)"	2:04

All music is composed by Michiru Oshima

Star Wars: Visions – The Twins (Original Soundtrack)
No.	Title	Length
1.	"The Twin Star Destroyer"	1:37
2.	"Anthem of Imperial (Am's Theme)"	2:01
3.	"Warning Issuance"	0:29
4.	"Passage Through"	0:37
5.	"The Battle of Hangar Bay"	2:44
6.	"The Kyber Crystal"	1:17
7.	"Force-sensitive"	1:06
8.	"The Fate of Dark Side"	1:26
9.	"Duel of the Lightsaber"	1:09
10.	"Out of Control"	0:44
11.	"Choose Your Own Destiny (Karre's Theme)"	1:22
12.	"THE TWINS"	1:36

All music is composed by Kevin Penkin

Star Wars: Visions – The Village Bride (Original Soundtrack)
No.	Title	Length
1.	"The Village Bride"	4:32
2.	"CHIKYU"	0:45
3.	"A Desert of Two Sons"	1:19
4.	"Bue, Pluck & Bow"	3:05
5.	"IZUMA"	1:18
6.	"A Flock of X-Wings Descend Into a Mountain's Garden"	2:16
7.	"Requiem for Blasters"	1:22
8.	"MAGINA x FORCE"	2:22
9.	"Postlude"	0:58
10.	"Composer Diaries: Children of Magina"	6:37

All music is composed by Nobuko Toda & Kazuma Jinnouchi

Star Wars: Visions – The Ninth Jedi (Original Soundtrack)
No.	Title	Length
1.	"The Ninth Jedi - Prologue"	2:08
2.	"Seven Masterless Jedi"	2:31
3.	"Kara and Father"	3:48
4.	"Jedi Hunter"	0:59
5.	"Lightsaber"	1:14
6.	"Speederbike Chase"	1:31
7.	"Sendo-shi"	1:15
8.	"To the Aerial Temple"	0:45
9.	"The Battle of Jedi"	5:48

All music is composed by A-Bee & Keiichiro Shibuya

Star Wars: Visions – T0-B1 (Original Soundtrack)
No.	Title	Length
1.	"Start the Droids"	1:53
2.	"Dreaming"	0:46
3.	"Mitaka's Lab"	2:52
4.	"Adventure"	2:29
5.	"Electronic Force"	1:52
6.	"E-J-K (Electronic Jedi Knight)"	3:24

All music is composed by Michiru Oshima

Star Wars: Visions – The Elder (Original Soundtrack)
No.	Title	Length
1.	"Arrival"	0:37
2.	"The Contacts of the Heart"	0:38
3.	"Explore"	0:46
4.	"The Elder"	0:56
5.	"Darkness and Rain"	1:04
6.	"Fight"	0:38
7.	"The Winner"	0:21
8.	"Time Goes On"	0:42

All music is composed by Yoshiaki Dewa

Star Wars: Visions – Lop and Ochō (Original Soundtrack)
No.	Title	Length
1.	"The Empire"	0:47
2.	"Lop"	2:26
3.	"For MY Family"	3:17
4.	"Imperial Officer"	1:52
5.	"Ochō's Preparedness"	0:42
6.	"Succession Ceremony"	4:01
7.	"Thoughts"	4:19
8.	"FAMILY"	0:31

All music is composed by U-Zhaan

Star Wars: Visions – Akakiri (Original Soundtrack)
No.	Title	Length
1.	"Battle Rela"	1:13
2.	"Cameling - Shinobi Theka"	1:14
3.	"Float"	0:42
4.	"Anokoro"	0:52
5.	"Battle Rela (Reprise)"	1:21
6.	"Fall"	0:32
7.	"AKAKIRI"	1:06
8.	"Written Dream"	0:27

==== Volume 2 (2023) ====
All music is composed by Dan Levy

Star Wars: Visions, Vol.2 – Sith (Original Soundtrack)
No.	Title	Length
1.	"Black Canvas"	3:17
2.	"Sith Apprentice"	2:42
3.	"The Chase"	1:23
4.	"Light and Dark"	0:37
5.	"Destiny"	2:09

All music is composed by Leo Pearson

Star Wars: Visions, Vol.2 – Screecher's Reach (Original Soundtrack)
No.	Title	Length
1.	"Escape"	3:17
2.	"Departure"	3:25

All music is composed by Andrés Walker & Patricio Portius

Star Wars: Visions, Vol.2 – In the Stars (Original Soundtrack)
No.	Title	Length
1.	"Ruins"	1:36
2.	"Pigments"	0:47
3.	"Mom's Song"	1:48
4.	"Altar Rock"	1:34
5.	"Siblings"	1:13
6.	"The Mining Factory Pt. 2"	1:20
7.	"The Escape"	2:12
8.	"This Is Our Land!"	3:17
9.	"Mom's Song Reprise"	1:18
10.	"In the Stars Outro"	0:44

All music is composed by Jean-Marc Petsas

Star Wars: Visions, Vol.2 – I Am Your Mother (Original Soundtrack)
No.	Title	Length
1.	"I Am Your Mother"	1:09
2.	"Take the Controls"	1:07
3.	"You Are Embarrassing"	1:25
4.	"Unexpected Arrival"	0:54
5.	"Hanna City Flight Academy"	1:03
6.	"The Ryloth Roll"	1:19

All music is composed by Jang Young Gyu & Lee Byung-Hoon

Star Wars: Visions, Vol.2 – Journey to the Dark Head (Original Soundtrack)
No.	Title	Length
1.	"Ara of Dolgarak"	2:36
2.	"Dark Side"	1:29
3.	"Weapon Planet"	0:59
4.	"Ominous Reunion"	2:26
5.	"Journey to the Dark Head"	1:14
6.	"Lightsaber Duel"	1:00
7.	"Please Forgive Me"	2:06
8.	"Enlightenment"	1:26
9.	"Light and Hope"	1:20

All music is composed by Olivier Derivière

Star Wars: Visions, Vol.2 – The Spy Dancer (Original Soundtrack)
No.	Title	Length
1.	"Stormtroopers Leave"	1:09
2.	"The Spies"	3:04
3.	"Show Time"	2:00
4.	"An Old Wound"	1:54
5.	"The Spy Dancer Fight"	1:49
6.	"Evil and Love"	3:03
7.	"Never Give Up Hope"	2:06

All music is composed by Sneha Khanwalkar

Star Wars: Visions, Vol.2 – The Bandits of Golak (Original Soundtrack)
No.	Title	Length
1.	"Jangori Attack"	2:15
2.	"Alien Busker"	2:33
3.	"Jedi Fight"	1:32
4.	"Uss Paar"	1:17

All music is composed by Daniel Lopatin

Star Wars: Visions, Vol.2 – The Pit (Original Soundtrack)
No.	Title	Length
1.	"Digging"	3:17
2.	"Despair"	1:44
3.	"The Climb"	1:25
4.	"Crystal City"	1:15
5.	"Seized"	0:55
6.	"They'll Find Us"	1:00
7.	"Follow the light"	1:45
8.	"Finale"	2:11

All music is composed by Markus Wormstorm

Star Wars: Visions, Vol.2 – Aau's Song (Original Soundtrack)
No.	Title	Length
1.	"Aau's Song Intro"	0:55
2.	"Run Home"	1:00
3.	"Ride Home"	1:00
4.	"Sneaky Girl"	0:48
5.	"Cave to Outside"	2:01
6.	"Healing the Kyber"	1:45
7.	"It's a Gift"	2:33

== Release ==
Star Wars: Visions was released on September 22, 2021, on Disney+. From September 21 to 27, Disney screened "The Village Bride" along with movies playing at the El Capitan Theatre in Los Angeles. By November, the studio had submitted the film for consideration for the Academy Award for Best Animated Short Film. The second volume of shorts was released on May 4, 2023. The first volume of the series began streaming on Hulu on May 4, 2024.

== Reception ==
=== Viewership ===
Whip Media, which tracks viewership data for the more than 18 million worldwide users of its TV Time app, calculated that Star Wars: Visions was the fifth most-streamed original series in the U.S. during the week of September 26, 2021. According to market research company Parrot Analytics, which looks at consumer engagement in consumer research, streaming, downloads, and on social media, Star Wars: Visions experienced a notable 56% increase in demand following its release on September 22 during the week of September 25-October 1, 2023. The animated series garnered significant anticipation and positive pre-launch reviews, achieved a demand level 33.1 times higher than the average series in the US. This surge placed it among the most in-demand digital originals for the week, highlighting its strong reception and fan interest.

=== Critical response ===
==== Volume 1 ====
The review aggregator website Rotten Tomatoes reports a 96% approval rating with an average rating of 8.2/10, based on 53 reviews for the first season. The site's critical consensus reads, "Gorgeously animated and wildly creative, Visions is an eclectic, but wholly enjoyable collection of Star Wars stories that breathe new life into the galaxy." Metacritic gave the first season a weighted average score of 79 out of 100 based on reviews from 15 critics, indicating "generally favorable reviews".

Angie Han of The Hollywood Reporter praised the anthology for "a love of Star Wars that runs so deep it's bound to make new fans of the young and uninitiated, and remind old fans why they fell so hard for this universe in the first place," and highlighted "The Duel" and "T0-B1" as particularly strong installments. Tyler Hersko of IndieWire hailed the anthology as "one of, if not the best, titles - television, film, or otherwise - to come out of the franchise's era under Disney ownership," calling it "beautifully animated and smartly written" with "phenomenal" action scenes. Mike Hale of The New York Times wrote that the individual films "play like auditions for continuing series rather than organic wholes," while calling "The Duel", "T0-B1", "Lop and Ochō", and "Akakiri" the most interesting and exciting films, and noting the "handcrafted beauty" and "visual variety" of an anthology which achieves "both cross-cultural collaboration and mutual homage." Writing for CNN, Brian Lowry called the shorts "striking" and noted that "Star Wars: Visions does indeed present unique and intriguing visions, indicating there's plenty of room to experiment."

Jake Kleinman of Inverse called Star Wars: Visions "a revelation" and "Lucasfilm's best new story since the original trilogy," and highlighted "The Twins" as the project's best film. Writing for The A.V. Club, Juan Barquin praised the anthology for sparking "a kind of endless wonder" and rekindling "a child-like fascination with Star Wars", while highlighting "T0-B1", "The Twins", "The Village Bride", "Lop and Ochō", and "Akakiri" as standouts. Jordan Woods of The Harvard Crimson identified "The Ninth Jedi", "Tatooine Rhapsody", and "The Twins" as the highlight segments, and called the project as a whole "Star Wars at its best: bold, ambitious, creative, and, most importantly, innovative." Amon Warmann of Empire spotlighted "Akakiri", "T0-B1", "The Duel", and "The Ninth Jedi" as the best installments, rating the overall anthology with 4 out of 5 stars, and concluding that "the galaxy far, far away has never looked more stunning in animation, and at its best Visions folds core Star Wars tenets into compelling stories with characters you instantly want to see more of. Here's hoping this isn't the only season we get."

In addition to its reviews upon release, Star Wars: Visions was subsequently named one of the best animated projects of 2021 by Paste Magazine, TheWrap, Polygon, Collider, Gizmodo, Anime News Network, /Film, Comic Book Resources, and Rotten Tomatoes. The project was heralded as one of the best Star Wars titles in a decade or more, as well as what the future of the Star Wars franchise should be.

==== Volume 2 ====
Rotten Tomatoes gave the second season a 100% approval rating with an average rating of 8.9/10 based on 23 reviews. The site's critical consensus reads, "Animated with all the vibrancy of a crackling lightsaber, Star Wars: Visions' second volume is the work of Jedi Masters." Metacritic gave the second season a weighted average score of 88 out of 100 based on five reviews, indicating "universal acclaim".

Maggie Lovitt of Collider gave Volume 2 an "A" rating, stating that it "delivers some of the most inspiring Star Wars stories of this decade, simply by blending together the beauty of a story-rich globe and setting it free among the stars." She also praised the second season for exploring stories in "corners of the galaxy" that did not involve familiar elements and characters such as lightsabers and the Skywalkers. Lovitt also praised three Volume 2 stories for emphasizing motherhood: "I Am Your Mother", "The Spy Dancer", and "In the Stars". She also gave a favorable review of "Sith"'s animation for capturing the mood and conflicts of the story. Lovitt also praised LeAndre Thomas's "The Pit" for blending art with storytelling and messaging.

Brett White of Decider gave a positive review, describing the series as "the most straightforward proof of Star Wars' legacy and enduring relevance. It is repeatedly remarkable to watch animation studios tell Star Wars stories that are freed from the usual Star Wars trappings." White also described each Visions installment as a "self-contained story that still feels wholly part of the franchise and in tune with George Lucas' original, well, vision." White compared Visions Volume 2 favorably to canonical recent Lucasfilm productions The Book of Boba Fett and The Mandalorian Season 3.

Kambole Campbell of Empire gave Volume 2 four out of five stars, stating that "this kaleidoscopic anthology for the most part makes Star Wars feel new again. She praised the second season for building on the success of the first season by drawing upon several "international animation houses working across a variety of mediums." Campbell observed that the anthology format of the series allowed for a mixture of stories that blended various genres, historical and contemporary political references such as the Nazi occupation of France in "The Spy Dancer" and indigenous rights in "In the Stars", and cultural references such as Irish folklore in "Screecher's Reach" and Ndebele dress in "Aau's Song".

Samantha Nelson of IGN gave Volume 2 nine stars, stating that "alternately goofy, political, sweet, and thrilling, the show celebrates the broad reach of Star Wars and provides plenty of characters and plots compelling enough to anchor their own spinoffs." While Nelson noted that the season's themes were repetitive, she praised the diversity of the stories' characters and animation style. Nelson expressed concern about insufficient coordination among the studios to avoid overlapping themes in their stories, observing that a third of Volume 2's stories revolved around young girls finding mentors to teach them how to use the Force. Nelson praised Volume 2 for exploring the political aspects of Star Wars more than Volume 1, citing the theme of indigenous resistance in "In the Stars", forced labor in "The Pit", and resistance in "The Spy Dancer". Nelson also described Screecher's Reach as an inverse of Joseph Campbell's "hero's journey" and "I Am Your Mother" as a lighthearted "mother and daughter" story that differed from the higher-stakes drama of the other stories.

==== Volume 3 ====
Rotten Tomatoes gave the third season a 100% approval rating with an average rating of 8.9/10 based on 16 reviews. Jorgie Rodriguez of POC Culture gave Volume 3 four and a half stars out of five, stating that "this season also marks the first silent Star Wars short, with (Black)... The short is a harrowing exploration of the damage that war leaves on the human psyche, via a Stormtrooper nearing his final breath." Callie Hanna of the FandomWire gave Volume 3 nine stars out of ten and stated that "much like Volumes 1 and 2, the best thing about Star Wars Visions Volume 3 is how fresh it feels compared to every other current Star Wars project."

=== Accolades ===
Year	Award	Category	Nominee(s)	Result	Ref.
Volume 1
2022	Annie Awards	Best General Audience Animated Television Production	Star Wars: Visions (for "The Duel")	Nominated	
2022	Golden Reel Awards	Outstanding Achievement in Sound Editing – Animation Series or Short	David W. Collins, Matthew Wood, Luke Dunn Gielmuda, and Jana Vance (for "The Duel")	Nominated	
2022	Primetime Creative Arts Emmy Awards	Outstanding Short Form Animated Program	Star Wars: Visions (for "The Duel")	Nominated	
2022	Golden Trailer Awards	Best Animation/Family for a TV/Streaming Series	Star Wars: Visions	Nominated	
2023	Kidscreen Awards	Best New Series	Star Wars: Visions	Nominated	
2023	Kidscreen Awards	Best Animated Series	Star Wars: Visions	Nominated	
Volume 2
2023	Venice TV Awards	Best Animation	Star Wars: Visions (for "I Am Your Mother")	Won	
2024	Primetime Creative Arts Emmy Awards	Outstanding Individual Achievement in Animation	Almu Redondo (for "Screecher's Reach")	Won	
2024	Broadcast Awards	Best Children's Programme	Star Wars: Visions (for "I Am Your Mother")	Nominated	
2024	Annie Awards	Outstanding Achievement for Animated Effects in an Animated Television/Broadcast Production	Jonatan Catalán, Alberto Sánchez, Phoebe Arjona, Virginia Cantaro, and Rubén Hinarejos (for "Sith")	Nominated	
2024	Annie Awards	Outstanding Achievement for Character Animation in an Animated Television / Broadcast Production	Laurie Sitzia (for "I Am Your Mother")	Nominated	
2024	Annie Awards	Outstanding Achievement for Directing in an Animated Television / Broadcast Production	Paul Young (for "Screecher's Reach")	Won	
2024	Annie Awards	Outstanding Achievement for Editorial in an Animated Television / Broadcast Production	Richie Cody, ACE and BFE (for "Screecher's Reach")	Nominated	
2024	Annie Awards	Outstanding Achievement for Music in an Animated Television / Broadcast Production	Markus Wormstorm, Nadia Darries, and Dineo du Toit (for "Aau's Song")	Won	
2024	Annie Awards	Outstanding Achievement for Production Design in an Animated Television / Broadcast Production	Carlos Salgado (for "Sith")	Nominated	
2024	Golden Reel Awards	Outstanding Achievement in Sound Editing – Broadcast Animation	David W. Collins, Kevin Bolen, Bill Rudolph, Alex Wilmer, Shelley Roden, and Xiuzhu (Mimi) Guo (for "The Pit")	Nominated	
2024	Quirino Awards	Best Commissioned Film	"In the Stars"	Won	
2024	Quirino Awards	Best Commissioned Film	"Sith"	Nominated	
2024	Quirino Awards	Best Visual Development	Carlos Salgado, Linda Chen, Jonatan Catalan, Pablo Dominguez (for "Sith")	Nominated	
2024	Quirino Awards	Best Animation Design	Francisco Leiva, Edgar Sepúlveda (for "In the Stars")	Nominated	

== Tie-in media ==
=== Comics ===
Issues	Title	Writer	Artist	Release date
Star Wars: Visions #1	N/A	Takashi Okazaki		October 12, 2022
Star Wars: Visions – Peach Momoko #1	The Followers of Ankok	Peach Momoko		November 15, 2023
Star Wars: Visions – Takashi Okazaki #1	The Ronin and the Droid	Takashi Okazaki		March 20, 2024

=== Other ===
In March 2021, it was announced that Del Rey Books would publish Ronin: A Visions Novel, an original novel written by Emma Mieko Candon which builds on the story of "The Duel". It was released on October 12, 2021.

An art book with creator interviews and selected production materials from all nine shorts was published by Dark Horse Comics on April 12, 2022.

== Visions Presents ==
At Star Wars Celebration in April 2025, the spin-off series Star Wars: Visions Presents was announced. The first of these will be The Ninth Jedi, a full anime series building on the shorts of the same name. The series was released on August 5, 2026.
