= Emma Mieko Candon =

American writer

- Occupation: Writer

Emma Mieko Candon is an American writer.

== Career ==
Candon, who is of Japanese descent, began writing blog created jointly by several of her friends during her time in high school. It was then that she discovered her passion for writing.

In 2021, Candon published her first novel, Star Wars: Ronin: A Visions Novel, a novel set in the Star Wars universe, which serves as a continuation of the episode "The Duel" of the animated anthology web series Star Wars: Visions. The first 25 pages of the novel narrates the events seen in the episode, while the next 300 narrate an original story, created from scratch by Candon herself. Most of the characters in the novel are LGBT, including Ronin, who is the protagonist, something unusual in the science fiction genre. In addition, through this work Candon introduced trans men for the first time in the franchise, through the character of Yuehiro.

On May 11, Candon announced the launch of her second novel, The Archive Undying, a science fiction novel, which was finally published in 2023. To write the novel, Candon was inspired by her rejection of the so-called artificial intelligences of the present, denying their supposed intelligence and wondering how an artificial intelligence capable of developing emotionality and behaving like a real human being would behave. Based on these ideas, she also created the protagonist of the work, Sunai, who has an indestructible body but a strong trauma and is deeply damaged on an emotional level. Sunai was described positively by the work's editor as "a queer disaster."

== Bibliography ==
- Star Wars: Ronin: A Visions Novel (2021)
- The Archive Undying (2023)
