= Cestvs: The Roman Fighter =

Japanese manga series

- First tankōbon volume cover

セスタス -The Roman Fighter- (Sesutasu -Za Rōman Faitā-)
- Genre: Historical; Sports
- Manga

Kentō Ankoku Den Cestvs
- Written by: Shizuya Wazarai
- Published by: Hakusensha
- Magazine: Young Animal
- Original run: 1997 – 2009
- Volumes: 15
- Manga

Kendo Shitō Den Cestvs
- Written by: Shizuya Wazarai
- Published by: Hakusensha
- Magazine: Young Animal (2010–2014); Young Animal Arashi (2014–2018); Manga Park (2018–2020); Young Animal Zero (2020–present)
- Original run: May 28, 2010 – present
- Volumes: 12
- Anime television series
- Directed by: Toshifumi Kawase (chief); Kazuya Monma
- Written by: Toshifumi Kawase
- Music by: Masahiro Tokuda; Akihiro Manabe; Yoshiyasu Ueda
- Studio: BN Pictures (2D); Logic&Magic (3DCG)
- Licensed by: Crunchyroll
- Original network: Fuji TV (+Ultra)
- Original run: April 15, 2021 – June 24, 2021
- Episodes: 12
- icon

Cestvs: The Roman Fighter (Japanese: セスタス -The Roman Fighter-, Hepburn: Sesutasu -Za Rōman Faitā-) is a Japanese manga series written and illustrated by Shizuya Wazarai. The first series, Kentō Ankoku Den Cestvs, was serialized in Hakusensha's Young Animal from 1997 to 2009, with its chapters collected in 15 tankōbon volumes. A second series, Kendo Shitō Den Cestvs, was serialized in Young Animal from 2010 to 2014, later transferred to Young Animal Arashi, where it ran from 2014 to 2018, until the magazine ceased its publication; it was published on Manga Park online platform from 2018 to 2020, and was transferred to Young Animal Zero in 2020; as of 2024, 12 volumes have been released. An anime television series aired on Fuji TV's +Ultra programming block from April to June 2021.

== Characters ==
Cestvs (セスタス, Sesutasu)
Voiced by: Hiromu Mineta
Zafar (ザファル, Zafaru)
Voiced by: Rikiya Koyama
Ruska (ルスカ, Rusuka)
Voiced by: Kensho Ono
Demitrius (デミトリアス, Demitoriasu)
Voiced by: Hiroki Tōchi
Nero (ネロ)
Voiced by: Yūto Uemura
Agrippina (アグリッピーナ, Agurippīna)
Voiced by: Kikuko Inoue
Sabina (サビーナ, Sabīna)
Voiced by: Aya Endō
Emden (エムデン, Emuden)
Voiced by: Ryōta Takeuchi
Roxanne (ロクサーネ, Rokusāne)
Voiced by: Sanae Kobayashi
Narrator (ナレーション, Narēshon)
Voiced by: Akio Ōtsuka

== Media ==
=== Manga ===
Written and illustrated by Shizuya Wazarai, Kentō Ankoku Den Cestvs (拳闘暗黒伝セスタス, Kentō Ankoku Den Sesutasu; 'Boxing Dark Chronicles: Cestvs') was published in Hakusensha's Young Animal from 1997 to 2009. Hakusensha collected its chapters in fifteen tankōbon volumes, released from May 29, 1998, to May 29, 2009.

A sequel, titled Kendo Shitō Den Cestvs (拳奴死闘伝セスタス, Kendo Shitō Den Sesutasu; 'The Fist of the Gladiator: Cestvs') started in Young Animal on May 28, 2010. The series was transferred to Young Animal Arashi in 2014. After Young Animal Arashi ceased publication in 2018, the series was transferred to Manga Park web platform. The series was transferred to Young Animal Zero starting on November 9, 2020. Hakusensha released the first tankōbon volume on April 28, 2011. As of November 28, 2024, 12 volumes have been released.

==== Kentō Ankoku Den Cestvs ====
No.	Japanese release date	Japanese ISBN
1	May 29, 1998	978-4-592-13321-6
2	November 27, 1998	978-4-592-13322-3
3	May 28, 1999	978-4-592-13323-0
4	December 17, 1999	978-4-592-13324-7
5	June 29, 2000	978-4-592-13325-4
6	January 29, 2001	978-4-592-13326-1
7	February 28, 2002	978-4-592-13327-8
8	September 29, 2003	978-4-592-13328-5
9	August 27, 2004	978-4-592-13329-2
10	February 28, 2005	978-4-592-13330-8
11	September 29, 2005	978-4-592-14371-0
12	August 29, 2006	978-4-592-14372-7
13	July 27, 2007	978-4-592-14373-4
14	June 27, 2008	978-4-592-14374-1
15	May 29, 2009	978-4-592-14375-8

==== Kendo Shitō Den Cestvs ====
No.	Japanese release date	Japanese ISBN
1	April 28, 2011	978-4-592-14821-0
2	February 29, 2012	978-4-592-14822-7
3	December 26, 2012	978-4-592-14823-4
4	December 27, 2013	978-4-592-14824-1
5	March 27, 2015	978-4-592-14825-8
6	March 29, 2016	978-4-592-14826-5
7	May 29, 2017	978-4-592-14827-2
8	September 28, 2018	978-4-592-14828-9
9	June 28, 2019	978-4-592-14829-6
10	March 29, 2021	978-4-592-16160-8
11	May 29, 2023	978-4-592-16313-8
12	November 28, 2024	978-4-592-16314-5

=== Anime ===
An anime television series adaptation was announced in November 2020. The series was directed by Kazuya Monma, with Toshifumi Kawase serving as chief director and script supervisor, and produced by Bandai Namco Pictures. Masahiro Tokuda, Akihiro Manabe, and Yoshiyasu Ueda are composing the music. The boxing scenes are supervised by professional boxer Yoshihiro Kamegai. The 3DCG animation is produced by Logic&Magic, with character designs handled by Kei Yoshikuni, while the 2D character designs are handled by Yuka Shiga and Ako Nakazawa. The series aired on Fuji TV's +Ultra programming block from April 15 to June 24, 2021. The opening theme song, "Endeavor", is performed by Dragon Ash, while the ending theme song, "Kirei Da" (You're Beautiful), is performed by Sarasa Kadowaki. Crunchyroll licensed the series outside of Asia.

==== Episodes ====
No.	Title	Directed by (Note: Information is taken from the ending credits of each episode.)	Written by	Original release date
1	"Fighting Slave Cestvs"; Transliteration: "Kendo Sesutasu" (Japanese: 拳奴セスタス)	Harume Kosaka	Toshifumi Kawase	April 15, 2021
2	"A Different Kind of Fight"; Transliteration: "Ishu Kakutō" (Japanese: 異種格闘)	Harume Kosaka	Toshifumi Kawase	April 22, 2021
3	"The Boxing Dogs"; Transliteration: "Kentō no Inu-tachi" (Japanese: 拳闘の犬たち)	Kazuya Monma; Satoshi Yanagawa	Toshifumi Kawase	April 29, 2021
4	"Surviving Until Tomorrow"; Transliteration: "Ashita e no Seikan" (Japanese: 明日への生還)	Kaoru Yoshitake	Kōji Miura	May 6, 2021 (Note: This episode aired at 1:15 a.m. JST, 20 minutes after the original air time on Fuji TV.)
5	"Where Hope Can Be Found"; Transliteration: "Kibō no Arika" (Japanese: 希望の在り処)	Kazuya Monma	Toshifumi Kawase	May 13, 2021
6	"Separated From the Goddess"; Transliteration: "Megami to no Ketsubetsu" (Japanese: 女神との決別)	Kazuya Monma	Toshifumi Kawase	May 20, 2021
7	"Caged Screams"; Transliteration: "Ori no Naka no Sakebi" (Japanese: 檻のなかの叫び)	Kazuya Monma; Satoshi Yanagawa	Kōji Miura	May 27, 2021 (Note: This episode aired at 1:05 a.m. JST, 10 minutes after the original air time on Fuji TV.)
8	"Epiphany"; Transliteration: "Kaigan" (Japanese: 開眼)	Kazuya Monma; Satoshi Yanagawa	Kōji Miura	June 3, 2021
9	"The Lucky Man"; Transliteration: "Kōun na Otoko" (Japanese: 幸運な男)	Kazuya Monma; Satoshi Yanagawa	Toshifumi Kawase	June 10, 2021
10	"Quiet Groundwork"; Transliteration: "Shizuka Naru Fuseki" (Japanese: 静かなる布石)	Kaoru Yoshitake	Kōji Miura	June 17, 2021
11	"A New Battlefield"; Transliteration: "Arata Naru Senjō" (Japanese: 新たなる戦場)	Harume Kosaka	Toshifumi Kawase	June 24, 2021
