= Independent animation =

Animated media produced outside the major industry

The terms independent animation or indie animation refers to animated shorts, web series, and feature films produced, financed and created outside a major national animation industry.

== United States ==
In America, working independent animators included Mary Ellen Bute, John Whitney, Harry Everett Smith and Oskar Fischinger alongside earlier efforts of what would later become UPA.

In 1959, The Academy Awards witnessed the first independent animated film to win an Oscar with John Hubley's Moonbird which was also produced by wife and collaborator Faith Hubley using limited animation to tell their own personal stories.

Jordan Belson, Robert Breer and Stan Vanderbeek made groundbreaking experimental animation during this time.

Avant-garde animator Carmen D'Avino's Oscar-nominated Pianissimo (1963) was distributed by none other than Amos Vogel's legendary Cinema 16.

Other independent animators during this time included Jim Henson, Charles Braverman, Gene Deitch, Fred Mogubgub, Fred Wolf and Will Vinton. The latter two would go on to win Academy Awards for Best Animated Short Film along with the works of the Hubleys and Ernest Pintoff starting in the late 1950s-early 1960s.

In the late 1960s, animator Ralph Bakshi and producer Steve Krantz founded Bakshi Productions, establishing the studio as an alternative to mainstream animation by producing animation his own way and accelerating the advancement of female and minority animators. He also paid his employees a higher salary than any other studio at that time. In 1969, Ralph's Spot was founded as a division of Bakshi Productions to produce commercials for Coca-Cola and Max, the 2000-Year-Old Mouse, a series of educational shorts paid for by Encyclopædia Britannica. However, Bakshi was uninterested in the kind of animation he was producing, and wanted to produce something personal. Bakshi soon developed Heavy Traffic, a tale of inner-city street life. However, Krantz told Bakshi that studio executives would be unwilling to fund the film because of its content and Bakshi's lack of film experience. While browsing the East Side Book Store on St. Mark's Place, Bakshi came across a copy of R. Crumb's Fritz the Cat. Impressed by Crumb's sharp satire, Bakshi purchased the book and suggested to Krantz that it would work as a film.

Fritz the Cat (1972) was the first animated film to receive an X rating from the MPAA, and the highest grossing independent animated film of all time. Bakshi then simultaneously directed a number of animated films, starting with Heavy Traffic a year later. Ralph Bakshi became the first person in the animation industry since Walt Disney to have two financially successful films released back-to-back.

Alongside Bakshi came other independent animated features of the 70s and 80s (some made by former Disney animators) such as John David Wilson's Shinbone Alley (1971), Don Bluth's The Secret of NIMH (1982), Vinton's The Adventures of Mark Twain (1985) and Jerry Rees's cult classic The Brave Little Toaster (1987).

Notable award-winning films also from the 70s and 80s included Dale Case and Bob Mitchell's The Further Adventures of Uncle Sam (1970), Ted Petok's The Crunch Bird (1971), Frank Mouris's Frank Film (1973) and Jimmy Picker's Sundae in New York (1983).

Animation historians John Canemaker and Michael Sporn also made independent animation in New York, both earning Oscar nods for their work (only Canemaker won in 2005).

Other animators like Candy Kugel, Jeff Scher, Joanna Priestley, Kathy Rose, Suzan Pitt, Robert Swarthe, Vince Collins, Barrie Nelson, Eli Noyes, Sky David (aka Dennis Pies), Steve Segal, Mike Jittlov, Paul Fierlinger, Len Lye, Adam Beckett, Lillian Schwartz, Larry Cuba and George Griffin also made experimental and personal animation during the mid- to late 1970s through the early- to mid-1980s.

In the 1970s, independent animator Sally Cruikshank (known for the 1975 cult short Quasi at the Quackadero alongside animated segments for Sesame Street) continued to explore independent and D.I.Y. distribution options, but were still largely met with rejection even though her work is now considered ground breaking.

Collections of independent films have been gathered for theatrical viewing, and video release, under such titles as the International Tournee of Animation (which existed between about 1965 and ended in the late 1990s), Spike and Mike's Classic Festival of Animation (1977 to 1990) and Spike and Mike's Sick and Twisted Festival of Animation since 1990. Contemporary independent animators, including Steven Subotnick, Bill Plympton, Don Hertzfeldt, Nina Paley and PES have also made work outside of the studio system.

=== Later independent animation ===
Sita Sings the Blues, a notable American independent animated film by Nina Paley

The rise of the Internet in the 1990s and 2000s saw an exponential increase in the production of independent animation which included personal independent works by Timothy Hittle, Janie Geiser, John R. Dilworth, Lewis Klahr and John Schnall. Personal computer power increased to the point where it was possible for a single person to produce an animated cartoon on a home computer, using software such as Flash, and distribute these short films over the World Wide Web. Independently produced Internet cartoons flourished as the popularity of the Web grew, and a number of strange, often hilarious short cartoons were produced for the Web.

In the late 1990s, an independent animated short film called The Spirit of Christmas was produced for under $2,000 by two artists, Matt Stone and Trey Parker. This film was widely distributed on the Internet as a pirated cartoon, and its phenomenal popularity gave rise to the popular television animated series South Park. Limited 1990s bandwidth made streaming difficult, if not impossible. While some animators like Spümcø's John K. opted to use Flash, it still required a plug-in making it unviewable in many early web browsers. Other early online animators like M. Wartella opted to use the Animated GIF to overcome these limitations and create early web-based animation viewable through all browsers.

Independent animation in the 2000s included animated features such as Paley's Sita Sings the Blues, Christiane Cegavske's Blood Tea and Red String, the CGI-animated features Hoodwinked! and Barnyard and Indiewood director Wes Anderson's first foray into animation territory: his 2009 stop-motion adaptation of Roald Dahl's Fantastic Mr. Fox.

By the mid-to-late 2000s YouTube and the Internet and like-minded online video distribution, in addition to independent broadcasting sites that followed, proved to be a dominant form of independently distributed, broadcast, edited, and produced animation TV shows, anime, feature films, music videos, retro animation, commercials, trailers, original online animation content, and web exclusives (which would otherwise not stand a chance of seeing airtime on more normal and expensive forms of mainstream broadcasting on most television networks, which still continue to function on a more traditional distribution matrix). Annoying Orange, which started off as a series of viral quasi-CGI animated comedy shorts on YouTube, quickly gained a cult following and an excess of 100 million views online. It is an example of an animated web series to transition between Internet and television distribution successfully, as an animated series on Cartoon Network.

American animated indie features from the 2010s included two notable adult dramas: Chris Sullivan's Consuming Spirits (2013) and Charlie Kaufman's Academy-Award nominated Anomalisa (2015).

The Oregon-based stop-motion animation studio Laika is best known for their Oscar-nominated efforts such as Corpse Bride, Coraline, ParaNorman, The Boxtrolls and Kubo and the Two Strings. Wes Anderson would return to stop-motion animation with Isle of Dogs (2018).

Recent independent animations released on YouTube included the pilot for Lackadaisy and the all-ages web series, Sherwood, which also released all 12 episodes on YouTube Originals and were made freely available in April 2020.

Alternative comics artist turned animator Dash Shaw's Cryptozoo enjoyed critical success at the 2021 Sundance Film Festival to the point of winning the NEXT Innovator Award while it was also nominated for the John Cassavetes Award at the 37th Independent Spirit Awards a year afterwards. Julian Glander's CGI debut feature Boys Go to Jupiter would also be nominated for the same award at the 41st ceremony.

Oscar-nominated animator Andrew Chesworth formerly worked at Disney (being animator on Wreck-It Ralph, Frozen, Get a Horse!, Big Hero 6, Feast, Zootopia and Moana) and Netflix (on the 2019 Annie Award for Best Animated Feature winner Klaus) while working independently on his passion projects including his 2023 Oscar-qualifying The Brave Locomotive, a love letter to the Andrews Sisters and 1940s animation. First conceived in 2008, he released online in 2015 the opening sequence that was in progress before shelving it after being hired by Disney in 2011. Simultaneously, another Oscar-nominated Disney animation veteran, Aaron Blaise (Beauty and the Beast, Aladdin, The Lion King and Brother Bear), directed and animated his 2025 short film effort, Snow Bear, independently over the span of three years.

Other notable animated indie efforts of the 2020s include Marcel the Shell with Shoes On, Ninety-Five Senses, Mad God, War Is Over!,My Year of Dicks, Tangles and Forevergreen.

The analog horror webseries Angel Hare, inspired by Christian animated cartoons, was made independently by twin sisters Hannah and Rachel Mangan under their studio East Patch.

In September 2025, Polygon said that Vivienne Medrano, creator of Hazbin Hotel and Helluva Boss and founder of SpindleHorse, was at "the center of an expanding animation empire," with Medrano telling the publication that the creation of an 11-minute animated pilot for the webcomic Homestuck will be a "test pilot" for many aspects, including "the studio, the process, a new style, [and] a new technology." She expressed her hope that the project would be opening the door for Spindlehorse working with additional creators, like artists or those who created webcomics, with "more original projects," to support other voices apart from her own ideas.

In 2025, the web animated series Battle for Dream Island released some of its episodes in theaters nationally.

== Minority representation ==
=== LGBT representation ===
LGBTQ+ representation in independent animation has increased over the years, as many series have featured LGBTQ+ characters. Lizzy the Lezzy, which premiered on Myspace in 2006, included LGBTQ+ characters like Lizzy, a lesbian. Plum, a bisexual character, first appeared in the animated series, Bravest Warriors, a show which aired on Cartoon Hangover's YouTube channel from 2012 to 2018, as confirmed by her crushes and by writer Kate Leth. The show was made by Adventure Time creator Pendleton Ward and featuring Ian Jones-Quartey, who voiced the character, Wallow, while he directed his own show, OK K.O.! Let's Be Heroes which featured multiple LGBTQ+ characters. Although Plum had a crush on Chris, kissing him multiple times during the show, she is also madly in love with her doppelganger as shown in the comics.

SpindleHorse Toons's Hazbin Hotel, by Vivienne Medrano, centers around a bisexual princess of Hell named Charlie, with a girlfriend named Vaggie, with the series also featuring an asexual character named Alastor, and a gay pornstar named Angel Dust. Medrano's other series, Helluva Boss, featured various bisexual characters, such as a demon named Moxxie, and a pansexual demon named Blitzo.

My Pride: The Series, which premiered in February 2020 on YouTube, follows a "queer, disabled lioness" named Nothing who is trying to heal the world.

Nico Colaleo's animated web series, Too Loud, the first season which ran from July to August 2017, and the second season which aired from September to November 2019, includes an LGBTQ+ character. In the episode "Slumber Party Sneak-In," Desiree plots with her sister, Sara, to dress up as a girl in order to go to a slumber party. The rest of the girls find this out, then console her, accepting, and deciding they like her no matter whether she is a trans girl named Desiree or as a closeted boy. In September 2019, Colaleo later described the episode as important, described it as his favorite episode of the show's second season, and a "pro-transgender episode."

The 2017 Student Academy Award-winning short film In a Heartbeat also features two gay characters as well.

=== Racial diversity ===
Angakusajaujuq: The Shaman's Apprentice (2020), featuring Canadian Inuit characters, won Best Independent Short Film at the Festival Stop Montreal.

African American animator/filmmaker Ayoka Chenzira is known for the 1984 satirical animated short Hair Piece: A Film for Nappyhead People, which was inducted into the National Film Registry in 2018. Another example of independent African-American animation is Bruce W. Smith's 2019 Academy Award-winning short film Hair Love.

The 2016 autobiographical stop-motion short Deer Flower, made by Los Angeles-based filmmaker Kangmin Kim, mines his childhood in South Korea for themes.

== Independent animation outside the United States ==
=== Mexico ===
The dark fantasy feature Soy Frankelda (2025), directed by brothers Arturo and Roy Ambriz and mentored by Academy Award-winning director Guillermo del Toro, is considered to be the first independently made Mexican stop-motion film.

The rediscovered cult space opera Roy del espacio (1983), the country's third animated feature, was made with non-professional animators over the course of three years.

=== Italy ===
Independent Italian animators include Ursula Ferrara (who used techniques similar to animation pioneers like Emile Cohl on her 1986 film Lucidi Folli), Alberto D'Amico, Saul Saguatti (known for his 1995 series Short Splatter Collection) and Bruno Bozzetto, known for the 1976 feature Allegro Non Troppo and the 1990 Academy Award-nominated Grasshoppers.

=== Germany ===
One of the earliest feature-length animated films was The Adventures of Prince Achmed, made in 1926 by Lotte Reiniger, a German artist who made silhouette animation using intricate cut-out figures and back-lighting.

Another notable animated indie made in Germany is the Lauenstein Brothers 1989 Academy Award-winning short Balance (1989).

=== United Kingdom ===
The BFI funded around thirty pieces of experimental animation between the mid-fifties to mid-nineties (notable examples: the Brothers Quay). Another major contributor to independent animation in Britain was Channel 4, which gained an international reputation as one of the most adventurous broadcasters of animation featuring works from Joanna Quinn (Girls' Night Out), Alison de Vere (Mr. Pascal) Paul Barry (The Sandman), Mark Baker (The Village), Barry Purves (Next) and former National Film Board of Canada animator Paul Driessen (3 Misses).

Two other British animated milestones, the 1978 adaptation of Watership Down by American filmmaker Martin Rosen and Nick Park's 1989 Oscar-winning short Creature Comforts, were also made independently as well.

=== France ===
Examples of French independent efforts include René Laloux's Cannes-winning Fantastic Planet (1973), Sylvain Chomet's The Triplets of Belleville (2003), Marjane Satrapi's own 2007 adaptation of her graphic novel Persepolis, A Cat in Paris (2011), Ernest & Celestine (2013) and Little Amélie or the Character of Rain (2025).

Oscar-winning actress Natalie Portman was one of the producers for French animator Ugo Bienvenu's 2025 debut feature, the anime-inspired Arco.

=== Japan ===
Satoshi Kon, Kōji Yamamura, Masaaki Yuasa, Yoji Kuri and Kihachiro Kawamoto have been prominently acclaimed Japanese independent animators known for their artistic qualities.

Hayao Miyazaki's 2001 Academy Award-winning classic Spirited Away was also made independently as were Mamoru Hosoda's 2018 Academy Award-nominated feature Mirai and the experimental shorts of Osamu Tezuka (1984's Jumping and 1985's Broken Down Film).

=== China ===
Animation director Liu Jian is known for his independently-produced features Piercing I (2010) and Art College 1994 (2023).

The cult low tech coming of age story Niu Lai (2026) made over 1.5 million at the box office despite negative reviews and lack of marketing.

=== South Korea ===
Independent cel animation made in South Korea during the 1980s-90s included Lee Yong-bae's award-winning tale of Sleeping Buddha Wa-Bull (1994) and powerfully political efforts from Choe Jeong-hyeon.

=== Brazil ===
Anélio Latini's Amazon Symphony (1953), the first animated feature-length film of Brazil, is also the first independent animation from the country. It was entirely produced by Anélio in a span of five years, with the help of his brother and with scarce technological resources.

Starting in the 1990s, independent animation studios have become more prominent in Brazil. Some examples are Belli Studio (Boris e Rufus and Esquadrão do Mar Azul) founded in 1999, and Combo Studio (O (Sur)real Mundo de Any Malu) founded in 2015.

Since the 2010s, the adoption of personal computers in Brazilian homes alongside the rise of social media contributed to the feasibility of independent animation that drew national and international attention, for a range of audiences. Examples of virtual indie animators includes Ronaldo de Azevedo (Gato Galáctico and Turma do Cueio), Júlio Cesar (Juca Jacaré) and Fernanda Dias (Witch Bunny).

In 2016, Alê Abreu's Boy and the World (released in 2013) won the first Annie Award for Best Animated Feature – Independent at the 43rd Annie Awards. Two years later, Tito and the Birds would be nominated in the same category. In 2023, Marcelo Marão's Bizarros Peixes das Fossas Abissais, which was entirely produced by a small team of up to 10 artists, won a prize at the MONSTRA - Lisbon Animation Festival.

=== Philippines ===
Independent animation in the Philippines provides as a medium at large by aspiring animators and experimental artists as in the case of the works of Roxlee (The Great Smoke and ABCD).

The non-profit organization Tuldok Animation Studios Inc. is known for Flipino-related projects like Libingan and Pasintabi.

=== Chile ===
Gabriel Osorio Vargas and Pato Escala's 2014 debut short film, Bear Story, won the Academy Award for Best Animated Short. As a result, many animators such as Fernanda Frick (Here's the Plan), who worked on Bear Story, and Hugo Covarrubias (the Oscar-nominated Bestia) made their own animated shorts in Chile.

=== Czech Republic ===
Michaela Pavlátová is known for making independent efforts such as the 2021 feature My Sunny Maad, which was nominated for the Golden Globe Award for Best Animated Feature Film.

Other legendary Czech independent animators include Jiří Trnka and Jan Švankmajer.

=== Estonia ===
Estonian animator Priit Pärn is known for his crude drawings, dark humor and satirical absurdist tone on such films as Breakfast on the Grass (1988) and 1895 (1995; the latter spoofing cinema's impact on perceptions of history, identity and nationality filled with cinematic references, cultural stereotypes and inside jokes).

=== Latvia ===
Gints Zilbalodis won both the Academy Award and Golden Globe for Best Animated Feature (the first Latvian to win such accolades) for his 2024 dialogue-free effort Flow, about a dark grey cat alongside a dog, lemur and other creatures surviving a post-apocalyptic flood. The former victory marked the first time that an independent animated feature won in said category.

The film's win for the Independent Spirit Award for Best International Film marked the first time an animated feature to win an Independent Spirit Award for any category.

Another notable Latvian indie animator is Signe Baumane, known for more adult–oriented animated features such as Rocks in My Pockets and My Love Affair with Marriage.

=== Denmark ===
Jonas Poher Rasmussen's 2021 animated documentary Flee was nominated for three Oscars: Best Documentary Feature, Best International Feature Film (the second Non-English-language animated film after Ari Folman's 2008 Israeli war documentary Waltz with Bashir) and Best Animated Feature (becoming the first animated film ever to be nominated in all three of those categories).

=== Australia ===
Bill Kroyer's 1992 feature debut Ferngully: The Last Rainforest, featuring the voice of comedian Robin Williams as Batty, was also made independently (under his own studio Kroyer Films, which also made the 1988 Academy Award-nominated Technological Threat) as an Australian-American co-production later to be distributed by 20th Century Fox.

Independent animation entirely from down under includes the works of Felix Colgrave and acclaimed stop motion animator Adam Elliot, known for his Oscar-winning short film Harvie Krumpet (2003) and feature films Mary and Max (2009) and Memoir of a Snail (2024).

Another Australian indie animation studio is Glitch Productions, which was founded in 2017 by brothers Luke and Kevin Lerdwichagul, the creators of the sketch comedy machinima web series SMG4. They have created the acclaimed shows Murder Drones and The Amazing Digital Circus as well as other original shows that received positive responses to overwhelming acclaim. The finale episode of The Amazing Digital Circus was released for international theatres from June 4th through 18th in 2026 before its global release on June 19th through YouTube and Netflix.

=== Canada ===
Outside of NFB, independent animation entirely from Canada also includes Marv Newland, who is best known for his 1969 cult animated short Bambi Meets Godzilla, Danny Antonucci, known for his 1987 short Lupo the Butcher, and the collage works of Winston Hacking.

The 2025 animated documentary Endless Cookie was nominated for Best Documentary Feature at the 41st Independent Spirit Awards.

=== Israel ===
Independent animated efforts from Israel include the aforementioned Waltz with Bashir and Tal Kantor's 2023 Oscar-nominated short Letter to a Pig.

=== Iran ===
Recent Iranian independent efforts include The Last Fiction and the Oscar-winning In the Shadow of the Cypress.

=== Spain ===
Spain's contributions to independent animation include Sergio Pablos's Klaus (2019), Alberto Vázquez's Unicorn Wars (2022) and Pablo Berger's Robot Dreams (2023).

=== Notable animated independent films from other countries ===
- Alephia 2053 (Lebanon)
- Metegol (Argentina)
- Mavka: The Forest Song (Ukraine)
- Tomm Moore's Irish Folklore Trilogy (Ireland)
- We Can't Live Without Cosmos (Russia)
- Surogat (Yugoslavia)
- The Peasants (Poland)
- Harpya (Belgium)
- Anna & Bella (The Netherlands)
- Ruben Brandt, Collector (Hungary)

== See also ==
- Independent film
- Arthouse film
- Zagreb Film
- Pannonia Film Studio
- Norman McLaren - Scottish experimental animator who worked at the National Film Board of Canada
- United Productions of America
- Adult animation
- Soyuzmultfilm
- Halas & Batchelor
- Richard Williams - director of the independently produced The Thief and the Cobbler
- Cartoon Saloon
- Animation Show of Shows - showcase for both independent and mainstream animated shorts
- International Tournée of Animation
- The Animation Show
- Spike and Mike's Festival of Animation
- Arthouse animation
- Mondo Media
- Charlie the Unicorn
- Newgrounds
- Nicktoons Film Festival
