= Annie Award for Best Animated Short Subject =

Annual US film award

- Awarded for: Excellence in animated short subjects
- Country: United States
- Presented by: ASIFA-Hollywood
- First award: 1995
- Currently held by: Snow Bear (2025)
- Website: annieawards.org

The Annie Award for Best Animated Short Subject is an Annie Award given annually to the best animated short film.

== History ==
It was introduced in 1995. In 1998, the award was renamed to Outstanding Achievement in an Animated Short Subject, and renamed again to Outstanding Individual Achievement in Animated Short Subject in 1999, but went back to its second title in 2000. In 2005, it was again reverted to its original title, and has remained so ever since.

== Winners and nominees ==
=== 1990s ===
| Year | Short Film | Studios |
1995 (23rd)
| 1995 (23rd) | Dexter's Laboratory | Hanna-Barbera |
| 1995 (23rd) | Driving Mr. Pink | Metro-Goldwyn-Mayer Animation |
| 1995 (23rd) | George and Junior's Christmas Spectacular! | Hanna-Barbera |
| 1995 (23rd) | Johnny Bravo | Hanna-Barbera |
| 1995 (23rd) | Interview with Tallulah, Queen of the Universe | Queen of the Universe Productions |
1996 (24th)
| 1996 (24th) | Cow and Chicken - (for "No Smoking") | Hanna-Barbera |
1997 (25th)
| 1997 (25th) | "I Miss You" (Björk's music video) | Spümcø |
| 1997 (25th) | Saturday Night Live (for "The Ambiguously Gay Duo #2") | |
| 1997 (25th) | Saturday Night Live (for "The Ambiguously Gay Duo #3") | |
| 1997 (25th) | Action League Now! (for "Rock-a-Big Baby") | |
| 1997 (25th) | The Big Hunt | |
1998 (26th)
| 1998 (26th) | Geri's Game | Pixar Animation Studios |
| 1998 (26th) | Redux Riding Hood | Walt Disney Television Animation |
| 1998 (26th) | Three Little Pigs | Walt Disney Television Animation |
| 1998 (26th) | T.R.A.N.S.I.T. | Illuminated Film Company; Picture Start (associate) |
| 1998 (26th) | Titey | J.J. Sedelmaier Productions, Inc. |
1999 (27th)
| 1999 (27th) | Bunny | Blue Sky Studios |
| 1999 (27th) | Al Tudi Tuhak (Long, Long Ago) | Tod Polson |
| 1999 (27th) | Living Forever | FableVision Studios |
| 1999 (27th) | More | Bad Clams Productions in association with Swell Productions and Flemington Pictures |

=== 2000s ===
| Year | Short Film | Studios |
2000 (28th)
| 2000 (28th) | For the Birds | Pixar Animation Studios |
| 2000 (28th) | Ghost of Stephen Foster | Matthew Nastuk, Raymond S. Persi |
| 2000 (28th) | John Henry | Walt Disney Pictures |
| 2000 (28th) | Little Go Beep | Warner Bros. Animation |
| 2000 (28th) | Quick Draw El Kabong | WildBrain, Inc. |
2001 (29th)
| 2001 (29th) | Hubert's Brain | WildBrain, Inc. |
| 2001 (29th) | Mr. Digital Tokoro #1542 | Nippon Television |
| 2001 (29th) | Rejected | Don Hertzfeldt |
| 2001 (29th) | Stubble Trouble | Calabash Animation |
| 2001 (29th) | Tenacious D: Fuck Her Gently | Spümcø |
| 2001 (29th) | VAP | Polygon Pictures; TV Club; Hakuhodo |
2002 (30th)
| 2002 (30th) | The Story of The Tortoise & the Hare | Ray Harryhausen, Screen Novelties International |
| 2002 (30th) | The Groovenians | Cartoon Network Studios |
| 2002 (30th) | Night of the Living Doo | Cartoon Network |
2003 (31st)
| 2003 (31st) | Boundin' | Pixar Animation Studios |
| 2003 (31st) | Amanda | Vinton Studios |
| 2003 (31st) | Boys Night Out | Barley Films, LTD. |
| 2003 (31st) | Destino | Walt Disney Pictures |
| 2003 (31st) | Nibbles | Acme Filmworks |
2004 (32nd)
| 2004 (32nd) | Lorenzo | Walt Disney Pictures |
| 2004 (32nd) | Agricultural Report | Barley Films |
| 2004 (32nd) | It's the Cat | Mark Kausler |
| 2004 (32nd) | Rockfish | Blur Studio |
| 2004 (32nd) | Ryan | Copper Heart Entertainment; National Film Board of Canada |
2005 (33rd)
| 2005 (33rd) | The Fan and the Flower | Atomic Television, Plymptoons Productions |
| 2005 (33rd) | Life in Transition | Stretch Films |
| 2005 (33rd) | Milch | Klasky Csupo |
| 2005 (33rd) | The Moon and the Son: An Imagined Conversation | John Canemaker Productions |
| 2005 (33rd) | Moongirl | Laika |
2006 (34th)
| 2006 (34th) | No Time for Nuts | Blue Sky Studios |
| 2006 (34th) | Adventure Time | Nickelodeon |
| 2006 (34th) | Don't Download This Song | Acme Filmworks |
| 2006 (34th) | Fumi and the Bad Luck Foot | Thunderbean Animation |
2007 (35th)
| 2007 (35th) | Your Friend the Rat | Pixar Animation Studios |
| 2007 (35th) | Shorty McShorts' Shorts (for "Mascot Prep") | Walt Disney Television Animation |
| 2007 (35th) | The Chestnut Tree | Picnic Pictures |
| 2007 (35th) | Everything Will Be OK | Don Hertzfeldt |
| 2007 (35th) | How to Hook Up Your Home Theater | Walt Disney Animation Studios |
2008 (36th)
| 2008 (36th) | A Matter of Loaf and Death | Aardman Animations |
| 2008 (36th) | Glago's Guest | Walt Disney Animation Studios |
| 2008 (36th) | Hot Dog | Bill Plympton Studios |
| 2008 (36th) | Presto | Pixar Animation Studios |
| 2008 (36th) | Cookie Blues | Luke Rosin (eLuko Productions) |
2009 (37th)
| 2009 (37th) | Robot Chicken: Star Wars Episode II | ShadowMachine |
| 2009 (37th) | Pups of Liberty | Picnic Pictures |
| 2009 (37th) | Santa, the Fascist Years | Plymptoons |
| 2009 (37th) | The Rooster, The Crocodile and The Night Sky | Barley Films |
| 2009 (37th) | The Story of Walls | Badmash Animation Studios |

=== 2010s ===
| Year | Short Film | Studios |
2010 (38th)
| 2010 (38th) | Day & Night | Pixar Animation Studios |
| 2010 (38th) | The Renter | Jason Carpenter |
| 2010 (38th) | The Cow Who Wanted to Be a Hamburger | Plymptoons Studio |
| 2010 (38th) | Enrique Wrecks the World | House of Chai |
| 2010 (38th) | Coyote Falls | Warner Bros. Animation |
2011 (39th)
| 2011 (39th) | Adam and Dog | Minkyu Lee |
| 2011 (39th) | I Tawt I Taw A Puddy Tat | Warner Bros. Animation |
| 2011 (39th) | La Luna | Pixar Animation Studios |
| 2011 (39th) | (Notes on) Biology | Ornana Films |
| 2011 (39th) | Paths of Hate | Platige Image |
| 2011 (39th) | Sunday (Dimanche) | National Film Board of Canada |
| 2011 (39th) | Wild Life | National Film Board of Canada |
| 2011 (39th) | The Ballad of Nessie | Walt Disney Animation Studios |
| 2011 (39th) | The Girl and the Fox | Base14 |
2012 (40th)
| 2012 (40th) | Paperman | Walt Disney Animation Studios |
| 2012 (40th) | Brad and Gary | Illumination Entertainment |
| 2012 (40th) | Bydlo | National Film Board of Canada |
| 2012 (40th) | Eyes on the Stars | StoryCorps |
| 2012 (40th) | Goodnight Mr. Foot | Sony Pictures Animation |
| 2012 (40th) | Kali the Little Vampire | National Film Board of Canada |
| 2012 (40th) | Maggie Simpson in The Longest Daycare | Gracie Films, 20th Century Fox Television |
| 2012 (40th) | The Simpsons – "Bill Plympton Couch Gag" | Gracie Films, 20th Century Fox Television |
2013 (41st)
| 2013 (41st) | Get a Horse! | Walt Disney Animation Studios |
| 2013 (41st) | Despicable Me 2 – "Puppy" | Illumination Entertainment |
| 2013 (41st) | Gloria Victoria | National Film Board of Canada |
| 2013 (41st) | My Mom is an Airplane | Acme Filmworks |
| 2013 (41st) | The Numberlys | Moonbot Studios |
2014 (42nd)
| 2014 (42nd) | Feast | Walt Disney Animation Studios |
| 2014 (42nd) | Coda | And Maps And Plans Ltd. |
| 2014 (42nd) | Duet | Glen Keane Productions, Google ATAP |
| 2014 (42nd) | The Simpsons – "Michal Socha Couch Gag” | Gracie Films, 20th Century Fox Television |
| 2014 (42nd) | Me and My Moulton | Mikrofilm AS, National Film Board of Canada |
| 2014 (42nd) | Silent | Moonbot Studios |
| 2014 (42nd) | The Dam Keeper | Tonko House LLC |
| 2014 (42nd) | The Raven | Moonbot Studios |
2015 (43rd)
| 2015 (43rd) | World of Tomorrow | Don Hertzfeldt |
| 2015 (43rd) | Carface | National Film Board of Canada |
| 2015 (43rd) | DISSONANCE | frameboX |
| 2015 (43rd) | If I Was God... | National Film Board of Canada |
| 2015 (43rd) | On Ice | Google/Evil Eye Pictures |
| 2015 (43rd) | Sanjay's Super Team | Pixar Animation Studios |
2016 (44th)
| 2016 (44th) | Piper | Pixar Animation Studios |
| 2016 (44th) | Blind Vaysha | National Film Board of Canada |
| 2016 (44th) | Deer Flower | Studio ZAZAC |
| 2016 (44th) | Path Title Sequence | Acme Filmworks |
| 2016 (44th) | Pearl | Google Spotlight Stories, Evil Eye Pictures |
2017 (45th)
| 2017 (45th) | Dear Basketball | Glen Keane Productions |
| 2017 (45th) | Hedgehog's Home | National Film Board of Canada |
| 2017 (45th) | Negative Space | IKKI Films, Manuel Cam Studio |
| 2017 (45th) | Scavengers | Titmouse, Inc., Adult Swim |
| 2017 (45th) | Son of Jaguar | Google Spotlight Stories |
2018 (46th)
| 2018 (46th) | Weekends | Past Lives Productions |
| 2018 (46th) | Grandpa Walrus | Caïmans Productions |
| 2018 (46th) | Lost & Found | Wabi Sabi Studios |
| 2018 (46th) | SOLAR WALK | Nørlum |
| 2018 (46th) | Untravel | Film House Baš Čelik |
2019 (47th)
| 2019 (47th) | Uncle Thomas: Accounting for the Days | Ciclope Filmes, National Film Board of Canada, Les Armateurs |
| 2019 (47th) | Acid Rain | Animoon |
| 2019 (47th) | DONT KNOW WHAT | Thomas Renoldner |
| 2019 (47th) | Je sors acheter des cigarettes | Miyu Productions |
| 2019 (47th) | Purpleboy | Bando à Parte, Rainbox Productions, Ambiances... asbl, Luna Blue Film |

=== 2020s ===
| Year | Short Film | Studios |
2020 (48th)
| 2020 (48th) | Souvenir Souvenir | Blast Production |
| 2020 (48th) | Kkum | open the portal |
| 2020 (48th) | Blue Fear (Filles bleues, peur blanche) | Miyu Productions |
| 2020 (48th) | The Places Where We Live (Cake) | FX Productions and FX |
| 2020 (48th) | World of Tomorrow Episode Three: The Absent Destinations of David Prime | Don Hertzfeldt |
| 2021 (49th) | Bestia | Trébol 3 Producciones, MALEZA Estudio |
| 2021 (49th) | Easter Eggs | Animal Tank, Brecht Van Elslande |
| 2021 (49th) | MAALBEEK | Films Grand Huit Films à Vif |
| 2021 (49th) | Night Bus | Joe Hsieh Independent Production |
| 2021 (49th) | Steakhouse | Finta Film, Fabian & Fred, RTV Slovenija, Miyu Productions |
2022 (50th)
| 2022 (50th) | Ice Merchants | COLA Animation, Wild Stream |
| 2022 (50th) | Amok | Boddah |
| 2022 (50th) | Black Slide | The Hive Studio, FlipBook Studio |
| 2022 (50th) | Love, Dad | 13ka, FAMU, nutprodukcia |
| 2022 (50th) | The Flying Sailor | National Film Board of Canada |
2023 (51st)
| 2023 (51st) | WAR IS OVER! Inspired by the Music of John and Yoko | ElectroLeague |
| 2023 (51st) | Carne de Dios | Ojo Raro and Fedora Productions |
| 2023 (51st) | Daffy in Wackyland | Warner Bros. Animation |
| 2023 (51st) | Humo | Outik Animation, 3rd Street Video, Mindsoup Entertainment, and IMCINE |
| 2023 (51st) | Pina | PUNCHLINE CINEMA / NEXT DAYS FILMS |
2024 (52nd)
| 2024 (52nd) | Wander to Wonder | Circe Films, Kaap Holland Film, Les Productions de Milou, Beast Animation, Blink Industries, and Pictanovo |
| 2024 (52nd) | Beautiful Men | Animal Tank, Miyu Productions, and Ka-Ching Cartoons |
| 2024 (52nd) | In the Shadow of the Cypress | Barfak Animation Studio |
| 2024 (52nd) | Ruthless Blade | IDEOMOTOR Culture Media Co., Ltd. |
| 2024 (52nd) | The Swineherd | Fleng Entertainment and Tumblehead Productions |
2025 (53rd)
| 2025 (53rd) | Snow Bear | The Art of Aaron Blaise |
| 2025 (53rd) | Cardboard | Locksmith Animation |
| 2025 (53rd) | Ovary-Acting | Klipp og Lim, Jante Films and Apparat Filmproduktion AB |
| 2025 (53rd) | Pillowzzz | Animoshe |
| 2025 (53rd) | The Girl Who Cried Pearls | National Film Board of Canada |

== See also ==
- Academy Award for Best Animated Short Film
