= 53rd Annie Awards =

Annual animation awards ceremony held in 2026

- Date: February 21, 2026
- Site: Royce Hall; Los Angeles, California, U.S.
- Organized by: ASIFA-Hollywood

Highlights
- Best Animated Feature: KPop Demon Hunters
- Best Direction: Maggie Kang and Chris Appelhans; KPop Demon Hunters
- Most awards: KPop Demon Hunters (10)
- Most nominations: Film: Elio and KPop Demon Hunters (10); Television: Win or Lose (6)

The 53rd Annual Annie Awards honoring excellence in the field of animation of 2025 was held on February 21, 2026, at the University of California, Los Angeles's Royce Hall, presenting awards in 32 competitive categories as well as four juried special awards.

The nominees were announced on January 5, 2026. In the film categories, Elio and KPop Demon Hunters led the nominations with 10 each, followed by Little Amélie or the Character of Rain and Zootopia 2, both with seven apiece. In the television categories, Win or Lose led with six nominations, followed by Asterix and Obelix: The Big Fight and Common Side Effects with five each.

KPop Demon Hunters swept all 10 of its nominations, including Best Animated Feature.

== Winners and nominees ==
=== Productions categories ===
Best Feature	Best Feature — Independent
KPop Demon Hunters (Sony Pictures Animation and Netflix); Elio (Pixar Animation Studios); Little Amélie or the Character of Rain (Maybe Movies, Ikki Films and GKIDS); The Bad Guys 2 (DreamWorks Animation); Zootopia 2 (Walt Disney Animation Studios)	Arco (Remembers, MountainA France, France 3 Cinéma and NEON); A Magnificent Life (Mediawan, What the Prod and Bidibul Productions); I Am Frankelda (Cinema Fantasma, Warner Bros. Discovery, Woo Films and Cine Vendaval); Lost in Starlight (Netflix and Climax Studio); Scarlet (Studio CHIZU)
Best Special Production	Best Short Subject
Snoopy Presents: A Summer Musical (WildBrain Studios in association with Apple); A Loud House Christmas Movie: Naughty or Nice (Nickelodeon Animation Studio and Jam Filled Entertainment); Adult Swim's The Elephant (Titmouse, Inc. and Williams Street); Not Just a Goof (Venturia Animation Studios for CNEK Films LLC); The Night Before Christmas in Wonderland (Lupus Films and Universal Pictures Content Group)	Snow Bear (The Art of Aaron Blaise); Cardboard (Locksmith Animation); Ovary-Acting (Klipp og Lim, Jante Films, Apparat Filmproduktion AB); Pillowzzz (Animoshe); The Girl Who Cried Pearls (National Film Board of Canada)
Best Sponsored	Best TV/Media – Preschool
Olipop Yeti (Screen Novelties & Passion Pictures); Animated Short: "Trek" | Honkai: Star Rail (FLiiiP Design); Fortnite x The Simpsons: "Apocalypse D'Oh!" (Gracie Films in association with 20th Television Animation); LouiMax Dreams of Being an Adult (Imagine Create Media Inc. in conjunction with Maileg APS); Sonic Racing: CrossWorlds – The Animation (SEGA of America in association with GXS Productions)	Wow Lisa: "Rainy Day" (Punkrobot); Eva The Owlet: "Welcome to Treetopington" (Brown Bag Films / Scholastic Entertainment in association with Apple); Kindergarten: The Musical: "Gotta Go!" (Oddbot Entertainment, Disney Branded Television); The Tiny Chef Show: "Tiny Chef's Spooky Stump Spectacular" (Imagine Entertainment, Tiny Chef Productions, and Nickelodeon Productions); Xavier Riddle and the Secret Museum: "I am Jackie Robinson" (9 Story Media Group, Brown Bag Films)
Best TV/Media – Children	Best TV/Media – Mature
The Wonderfully Weird World of Gumball: "The Rewrite" (Hanna-Barbera Studios Europe); My Melody & Kuromi: "All For Our Best Friend" (Sanrio Company, WIT Studio for Netflix); Spice Frontier: Escape From Veltegar: "Episode1" (Steamroller Animation); Tales of the Teenage Mutant Ninja Turtles: "Rise of the Night Ninja" (Nickelodeon Animation Studios and Point Grey Pictures); Wylde Pak: "Sungandeul" (Nickelodeon Animation Studios, Jam Filled Entertainment)	Common Side Effects: "Pilot" (Green Street Pictures, Bandera Entertainment and Williams Street Productions); Bob's Burgers: "Grand Pre-Pre-Pre Opening" (20th Television); Haha, You Clowns: "Duncan Holds a Baby" (Williams Street); Il Baracchino: "Claudia entra in un caffè" (Luckyred and Megadrago); South Park: "Sermon on the ‘Mount" (Comedy Central)
Best TV/Media – Limited Series	Best Student Film
Win Or Lose: "Home" (Pixar Animation Studios); Asterix and Obelix: The Big Fight: "Episode III" (Netflix, Banijay Productions France and Légende Films); Eyes of Wakanda: "Into the Lion's Den" (Marvel Studios Animation); Marvel Zombies: "Episode 2" (Marvel Studios Animation); Star Wars: Visions – Volume 3: "BLACK" (David Production)	A Sparrow's Song – Tobias Eckerlin, director and producer (Filmakademie Baden-Württemberg GmbH, Animationsinstitut); Acrobats – Eloïse Alluyn, Hugo Danet, Anna Despinoy, Antonin Guerci, Alexandre Marzin, Shali Reddy, directors (Gobelins); Jour de vent – Martin Chailloux, Ai Kim Crespin, Elise Golfouse, Chloé Lab, Hugo Taillez, Camille Truding, directors (École des Nouvelles Images); The Undying Pain of Existence – Oscar Jacobson, director; Franz Rügamer, Nadiia Yunatska, producers (Filmakademie Baden-Württemberg GmbH, Animationsinstitut); TRASH – Maxime Crançon, Alexis Le Ral, directors; Robin Delaporte, Romain Fleischer, Mattéo Durand, producers (ESMA)

=== Individual achievement categories ===
Outstanding Achievement for Animated Effects in an Animated Television/Broadcast Production	Outstanding Achievement for Animated Effects in an Animated Production
Prehistoric Planet: Ice Age: "The Big Freeze" – Edward Ferrysienanda, Kevin Christensen, Guy Shuleman , Benedikt Roettger, and Kevin Tarpinian (Apple TV); Marvel Zombies: "Episode 4" – Emma Badia, Tristan Fairclough, Jimmy Dumont, Sheng Hung, and Arth Vasavada (Disney+); Spice Frontier: "Episode 1" – Effects Department (Steamroller Animation); Star Wars: Visions – Volume 3: "The Bird of Paradise" – Takashi Okamoto, Kohei Yamamoto, Genyo Sasaki, Chizuru Nakamura, and Erika Matsui (Disney+); WondLa: "Lost" – FX Team (Apple TV)	KPop Demon Hunters – Filippo Macari, Nicola Finizio, Simon Lewis, Naoki Kato, and Daniel La Chapelle; Elio – Ferdi Scheepers, Shaun Galinak, Alyssa Lee, Nate Skeen, and Gary Bruins; In Your Dreams – Dmitriy Kolesnik, Stephen Paschk, David Sellares, and Stephanie McNair; The Bad Guys 2 – Landon Gray, Michael Losure, Zachary Glynn, Chris Wombold, and Olivier Malric; Zootopia 2 – Le Joyce Tong, Shamintha Kalamba Arachchi, Dimitre Berberov, Chris Carignan, and Cristiana Covone
Outstanding Achievement for Character Animation in an Animated Television / Broadcast Production	Outstanding Achievement for Character Animation in an Animated Feature Production
Win or Lose – Alli Sadegiani (Disney+); Asterix and Obelix: The Big Fight: "Episode III" – Floriane Caseiro (Netflix); Forevergreen – Brendan Gottlieb (Nathan Engelhardt and Jeremy Spears); Snoopy Presents: A Summer Musical – Chris Derochie (Apple TV); The Simpsons – Nik Ranieri (Fox)	KPop Demon Hunters – Ryusuke Furuya; Elio – Jonah Sidhom; Little Amélie or the Character of Rain – Juliette Laurent; The Bad Guys 2 – Ludovic Bouancheau; Zootopia 2 – Tony Smeed
Outstanding Achievement for Character Animation in a Live Action Production	Outstanding Achievement for Character Animation in a Video Game
How To Train Your Dragon – Kayn Garcia, Jean-Denis Haas, Meena Ibrahim, Nathan McConnel, and Nick Tripodi; A Minecraft Movie – Kevin Estey, Anthony McIndoe, Jade Lorier, Caroline Ting, and Luisma Lavin Peredo; Captain America: Brave New World – Sidney Kombo-Kintombo, Andrew William Park, Marco Röth, Paul Seyb, and Thien Ly; Prehistoric Planet: Ice Age – Adrien Annesley, Alvise Avati, Riyad Chalakkara, Daniel Mizuguchi, and Liam Russell (Apple TV); Superman – Loic Mireault, Michael Elder, Philipp Winterstein, Victor Dinis, and Diego de Paula Pereira Batista	South of Midnight – Mike Jungbluth, Sebastien Dussault, Vincent Schneider, and Remi Edmond; Bye Sweet Carole – Chris Darril and Little Sewing Machine; Death Stranding 2: On the Beach – Hideo Kojima, Masaaki Kawata, and PlayStation Studios XDEV; Ghost of Yōtei – Sucker Punch Productions Animation Team; Keeper – Zach Baharov, Alex Turner, Jerry Matsko, Anne-Sophie Savard, and Geneviève Desbiens
Outstanding Achievement for Character Design in an Animated Television / Broadcast Production	Outstanding Achievement for Character Design in an Animated Feature Production
Love, Death & Robots: "400 Boys" – Robert Valley (Netflix); Asterix and Obelix: The Big Fight: "Episode IV" – Borja Montoro (Netflix); Bat-Fam: "A Knight at the Movies" – Benjamin Tong (Amazon Prime Video); Wednesdays with Gramps – Seth St. Pierre (DreamWorks Animation); Win or Lose: "Home" – Lou Hamou-Lhadj (Disney+)	KPop Demon Hunters – Scott Watanabe and Ami Thompson; Elio – Matt Nolte, Yingzong Xin, James Woods, Kaleb Rice, and Bob Pauley; Fixed – Craig Kellman; The SpongeBob Movie: Search for SquarePants – Adam Paloian, Thaddeus Couldron, and Alvi Ramirez; The Twits – Kei Acedera, Tristan Poulain, Jules Rigolle, Fernando Peque, and Remi Salmon
Outstanding Achievement for Directing in an Animated Television / Broadcast Production	Outstanding Achievement for Directing in an Animated Feature Production
Common Side Effects: "Cliff's Edge" – Vincent Tsui (Adult Swim); Dan Da Dan: "Clash! Space Kaiju vs. Giant Robot!" – Fuga Yamashiro and Abel Góngora (Netflix); Not a Box: "It's a Boat" – Siri Melchior (Apple TV); Tales of the Teenage Mutant Ninja Turtles: "Rise of the Night Ninja" – JJ Conway and Kevin Molina-Ortiz (Paramount+); The Quinta's Ghost – James A. Castillo (Martirio Films & Illusorium Films)	KPop Demon Hunters – Maggie Kang and Chris Appelhans; Arco – Ugo Bienvenu, Adam Sillard, and Anaëlle Saba; Chainsaw Man – The Movie: Reze Arc – Tatsuya Yoshihara; Little Amélie or the Character of Rain – Maïlys Vallade and Liane-Cho Han; Scarlet – Mamoru Hosoda
Outstanding Achievement for Editorial in an Animated Television / Broadcast Production	Outstanding Achievement for Editorial in an Animated Feature Production
Common Side Effects: "Raid" – Tony Christopherson and Joie Lim (Adult Swim); Asterix and Obelix: The Big Fight: "Episode III" – David Boyadjian (Netflix); Haunted Hotel: "The Acolytes of Abaddon" – Benjamin Morse, Benjamin Martian, and Marshall Wetta (Netflix); Invincible: "I Thought You'd Never Shut Up" – Luke Asa Guidici, Matt Michael, Lea Carosella, and Liam Johnson (Amazon Prime Video); Tom Clancy's Splinter Cell: Deathwatch: "Up From the Grave" – Thomas Belair, Nicolas Bourgeois, and Julien Perez (Netflix)	KPop Demon Hunters – KPop Demon Hunters Editorial Team; Arco – Nathan Jacquard; Elio – Anna Wolitzky, Steve Bloom, Noah Newman, Greg Snyder, and Ben Morris; Little Amélie or the Character of Rain – Ludovic Versace; Olivia & the Clouds – Tomás Pichardo Espaillat
Outstanding Achievement for Music in an Animated Television / Broadcast Production	Outstanding Achievement for Music in an Animated Feature Production
Win or Lose: "Mixed Signals" – Ramin Djawadi, Shane Eli, and Johnny Pakfar (Disney+); Common Side Effects: "Lakeshore Limited" – Nicolas Snyder (Adult Swim); Devil May Cry: "The First Circle" – Power Glove and Alex Seaver (Netflix); Éiru – Leo Pearson and Ceara Conway (Cartoon Saloon); Snoopy Presents: A Summer Musical – Ben Folds, Jeff Morrow, Alan Zachary, and Michael Weiner (Apple TV)	KPop Demon Hunters – KPop Demon Hunters Music Team; Arco – Arnaud Toulon; Elio – Rob Simonsen; Little Amélie or the Character of Rain – Mari Fukuhara; Zootopia 2 – Shakira, Ed Sheeran, Blake Slatkin, and Michael Giacchino
Outstanding Achievement for Production Design in an Animated Television / Broadcast Production	Outstanding Achievement for Production Design in an Animated Feature Production
Love, Death & Robots: "How Zeke Got Religion" – Gigi Cavenago (Netflix); Asterix and Obelix: The Big Fight: "Episode II" – Aurélien Prédal (Netflix); Forevergreen – Jeremy Spears and Gregory Culp (Nathan Engelhardt and Jeremy Spears); ParaNorman: The Thrifting – Thibault Leclercq, Santiago Montiel, Jung Woonyoung, and Stephanie Bray-Lee (Laika); Wednesdays with Gramps – Frederic Stewart (DreamWorks Animation)	KPop Demon Hunters – Helen Chen, Dave Bleich, Wendell Dalit, Scott Watanabe, and Celine Kim; Elio – Harley Jessup, Ernesto Nemesio, Maria Lee, Kristian Norelius, and Kyle Jones; The Bad Guys 2 – Luc Desmarchelier and Floriane Marchix; The Twits – Estefania Pantoja, Alexandre Diboine, Clement Dartigues, Fernando Peque, and Remi Salmon; Zootopia 2 – Cory Loftis and Limei Z. Hshieh
Outstanding Achievement for Storyboarding in an Animated Television / Broadcast Production	Outstanding Achievement for Storyboarding in an Animated Feature Production
Love, Death & Robots: "How Zeke Got Religion" – Edgar Martins (Netflix); ParaNorman: The Thrifting – Coleton Palmer, Katherine Jay Myong, and Heewon Jeong (Laika); Snow Bear – Aaron Blaise (Aaron Blaise Studios); Tales of the Teenage Mutant Ninja Turtles: "Rise of the Night Ninja" – Richard Chi, Matthew Kim, Sheldon Vella, and Lyndsay Simpson (Paramount+); Win or Lose: "Home" – Esteban Bravo (Disney+)	The Bad Guys 2 – Anthony Holden and Young Ki Yoon; Arco – Ugo Bienvenu; Elio – Tony Rosenast; Little Amélie or the Character of Rain – Nicolas Pawlowski; Zootopia 2 – Hikari Toriumi
Outstanding Achievement for Voice Acting in an Animated Television / Broadcast Production	Outstanding Achievement for Voice Acting in an Animated Feature Production
Dan Mintz – Bob's Burgers: "Don't Worry Be Hoopy" as Tina Belcher (Fox); Erika Henningsen – Hazbin Hotel: "Hazbin Hotel: Behind Closed Doors" as Charlie Morningstar (Amazon Prime Video); Abbi Jacobson – Long Story Short: "Shira Can't Cook" as Shira Schwooper; Zach Hadel – Smiling Friends: "Shmaloogles" as Evil Wizard; Alkaio Thiele – The Wonderfully Weird World of Gumball: "The Amadain" as Gumball Watterson	Arden Cho – KPop Demon Hunters as Rumi; Lil Rel Howery – Dog Man as Chief; Remy Edgerly – Elio as Glordon; Craig Robinson – In Your Dreams as Baloney Tony; Maitreyi Ramakrishnan – The Twits as Beesha
Outstanding Achievement for Writing in an Animated Television / Broadcast Production	Outstanding Achievement for Writing in an Animated Feature Production
Common Side Effects: "Pilot" – Joe Bennett and Steve Hely (Adult Swim); #1 Happy Family USA: "Nine Ten" – Ramy Youssef and Pam Brady (Amazon Prime Video); Adult Swim's The Elephant – Pendleton Ward, Ian Jones-Quartey, Rebecca Sugar, and Patrick McHale (Adult Swim); Lulu is a Rhinoceros – Allison Flom (Apple TV); Win or Lose: "Pickle" – Carrie Hobson and Michael Yates (Disney+)	KPop Demon Hunters – Danya Jimenez, Hannah McMechan, Maggie Kang, and Chris Appelhans; Elio – Julia Cho, Mark Hammer and Mike Jones; Little Amélie or the Character of Rain – Liane-Cho Han, Aude Py, Maïlys Vallade, and Eddine Noël; Scarlet – Mamoru Hosoda; Zootopia 2 – Jared Bush

== Juried awards ==
=== June Foray Award ===
- For "significant and benevolent impact to the animation community":
  - Producer Sandy Rabins, "for the AnimAID effort to assist and support those in the animation industry who were affected by the L.A. Wildfires"

=== The Special Achievement Award ===
- "Acknowledging unique and outstanding achievement not recognized within the existing award category structure":
  - The annual LightBox Expo event

=== Ub Iwerks Award ===
- For "technical advancement affecting the animation industry":
  - Wacom, "manufacturer of the Cintiq graphics tablet and other products that have become an integral part of animation production worldwide."

=== Winsor McCay Lifetime Achievement Awards ===
- "In recognition of lifetime or career contributions":
  - Michaël Dudok de Wit
  - Phil Lord and Christopher Miller
  - Chris Sanders

== Multiple awards and nominations ==
=== Films ===
The following films received multiple nominations:

Nominations	Film
10	Elio
10	KPop Demon Hunters
7	Little Amélie or the Character of Rain
7	Zootopia 2
5	Arco
5	The Bad Guys 2
3	Scarlet
3	The Twits
2	In Your Dreams

The following films received multiple awards:

Wins	Film
10	KPop Demon Hunters

=== Television/Broadcast ===
The following shows received multiple nominations:

Nominations	Show
6	Win or Lose
5	Asterix and Obelix: The Big Fight
5	Common Side Effects
3	Love, Death & Robots
3	Snoopy Presents: A Summer Musical
3	Tales of the Teenage Mutant Ninja Turtles
2	Adult Swim's The Elephant
2	Bob's Burgers
2	Forevergreen
2	Marvel Zombies
2	ParaNorman: The Thrifting
2	Prehistoric Planet: Ice Age
2	Snow Bear
2	Star Wars: Visions – Volume 3
2	The Simpsons
2	The Wonderfully Weird World of Gumball
2	Wednesdays with Gramps

The following shows received multiple awards:

Wins	Show
4	Common Side Effects
3	Love, Death & Robots
3	Win or Lose
