= Annie Award for Outstanding Achievement for Storyboarding in an Animated Television/Broadcast Production =

Annual animation award

Annie Award for Storyboarding in an Animated Television/Broadcast Production
- Awarded for: Excellence in storyboarding
- Country: United States
- Presented by: ASIFA-Hollywood
- First award: 1997
- Currently held by: Edgar Martins – Love, Death & Robots (2025)
- Website: annieawards.org

The Annie Award for Storyboarding in an Animated Television/Broadcast Production is an Annie Award given annually to the best storyboarding in animated television or broadcasting productions. It was first presented at the 25th Annie Awards.

== Winners and nominees ==
=== 1990s ===
Year	Program	Episode(s)	Recipient(s)	Network
1997 (25th)
1997 (25th)	Cow and Chicken	"Orthodontic Police"	Nora Johnson	Cartoon Network
1997 (25th)	Jungle Cubs	"A Night in the Wateland"	Denise Koyama	ABC
1997 (25th)	Spawn	"Burning Visions"	Eric Radomski	HBO
1997 (25th)	The Sylvester & Tweety Mysteries	"Spaced-Out"	Carolyn Gair-Taylor	Kids' WB
1997 (25th)	Timon & Pumbaa	"Bumble in the Jungle"	Bob Logan	Syndication
1998 (26th)
1998 (26th)	Pinky and the Brain	"Brain Acres"	Barry Caldwell	Kids' WB
1998 (26th)	Cow and Chicken	"The Karate Chick"	Maxwell Atoms	Cartoon Network
1998 (26th)	101 Dalmatians: The Series	"Badto the Bone"	Linda Miller	ABC
1998 (26th)	101 Dalmatians: The Series	"Home is Where the Bark is"	Cynthia Petrovic	ABC
1998 (26th)	Oh Yeah! Cartoons	"Chalkzone"	Carlos Ramos	Nickelodeon
1999 (27th)
1999 (27th)	Batman Beyond	"Black Out"	Adam Van Wyk	Kids' WB
1999 (27th)	Oh Yeah! Cartoons	"The Man with No Nose"	Alex Kirwan	Nickelodeon
1999 (27th)	Oh Yeah! Cartoons	"Max & His Special Problem"	Dave Wasson	Nickelodeon
1999 (27th)	'The Angry Beavers	"The Day the World Got Really Screwed Up"	Mitch Schauer	Nickelodeon
1999 (27th)	Mickey Mouse Works	"William Tell Overture"	Bob McKnight	ABC

=== 2000s ===
Year	Program	Episode(s)	Recipient(s)	Network
2000 (28th)
2000 (28th)	Mickey Mouse Works	"Halloween"	Rossen Varbinov	ABC
2000 (28th)	Max Steel	"Sharks"	Sean Song	Kids' WB
2000 (28th)	Johnny Bravo	"Noir Johnny"	Mary Hanley	Cartoon Network
2000 (28th)	Little Angelita		Nancy Beiman	Walt Disney Television Animation
2000 (28th)	The Weekenders	"Makeover"	Amber Deforest	ABC
2001 (29th)
2001 (29th)	Invader Zim	"The Nightmare Begins"	Steve Ressel	Nickelodeon
2001 (29th)	Ed, Edd n Eddy	"Wish You Were Ed"	James Wootton	Cartoon Network
2001 (29th)	X-Men: Evolution	"Strategy X"	Frank Paur	Kids' WB
2001 (29th)	Max Steel	"Steel Vs. Steel"	Sean Song	Kids' WB
2001 (29th)	The Zeta Project	"The Accomplice"	Adam Van Wyk	Kids' WB
2002 (30th)
2002 (30th)	Samurai Jack	"Jack and the Three Blind Archers"	Bryan Andrews	Cartoon Network
2002 (30th)	Jackie Chan Adventures	"Queen of the Shadowkhan"	Seung Eun Kim	Kids' WB
2002 (30th)	Balto II: Wolf Quest		Todd Britton	Universal Animation Studios
2003 (31st)
2003 (31st)	The Fairly OddParents	"Pipe Down"	Dave Thomas	Nickelodeon
2003 (31st)	He-Man and the Masters of the Universe	"Power of Grayskull"	Tim Divar	Cartoon Network
2003 (31st)	ChalkZone	"Pumpkin Love"	Enrique Braxton	Nickelodeon
2003 (31st)	Spider-Man: The New Animated Series	"Keeping Secrets"	Kyle Menke	MTV
2003 (31st)	Teen Titans	"Switched"	Matt Youngberg	Cartoon Network / Kids' WB
2004 (32nd)
2004 (32nd)	Dave the Barbarian	"The Maddening Sprite of the Stump"	Wendy Grieb	Disney Channel
2004 (32nd)	Atomic Betty	"Spindly Tam Kanushu"	Alex Basio	Teletoon
2004 (32nd)	He-Man and the Masters of the Universe	"Awaken the Serpent"	Adam Van Wyk	Cartoon Network
2004 (32nd)	Brandy & Mr. Whiskers	"To the Moon, Whiskers"	Rossen Varbanov	Disney Channel
2004 (32nd)	Teen Titans	"Haunted"	Matt Youngberg	Cartoon Network / Kids' WB
2005 (33rd)
2005 (33rd)	Avatar: The Last Airbender	"The Deserter"	Lauren MacMullan	Nickelodeon
2005 (33rd)	Kim Possible	"So the Drama"	Troy Adomitis	Disney Channel
2005 (33rd)	Kim Possible	"So the Drama"	Dave Bullock	Disney Channel
2005 (33rd)	Danny Phantom	"Identity Crisis"	Ben Balistreri	Nickelodeon
2005 (33rd)	Miss Spider's Sunny Patch Friends	"A Froggy Day in Sunny Patch"	Andrew Tan	Teletoon / Treehouse TV
2006 (34th)
2006 (34th)	The X's	"You Only Sneeze Twice"	Li Hong	Nickelodeon
2006 (34th)	American Dragon: Jake Long	"Breakout"	Troy Adomitis	Disney Channel
2006 (34th)	Danny Phantom	"Urban Jungle"	Ben Balistreri	Nickelodeon
2006 (34th)	Danny Phantom	"Reality Trip"	Shaut Nigoghossian	Nickelodeon
2006 (34th)	Hellboy: Sword of Storms		Adam Van Wyk	Cartoon Network
2007 (35th)
2007 (35th)	Family Guy	"No Chris Left Behind"	Steve Fonti	Fox
2007 (35th)	Danny Phantom	"Torrent of Terror"	Ben Balistreri	Nickelodeon
2007 (35th)	The Replacements	"London Calling"	Aldin Baroza	Disney Channel
2007 (35th)	Tom and Jerry Tales		Dave Bennett	Kids' WB
2007 (35th)	My Friends Tigger & Pooh	"Good Night to Pooh"	Roy Meurin	Playhouse Disney
2008 (36th)
2008 (36th)	Glago's Guest		Chris Williams	Walt Disney Animation Studios
2008 (36th)	Ni Hao, Kai-Lan	"Twirly Whirly Flyers"	Andy Kelly	Nick Jr. Channel
2008 (36th)	Secrets of the Furious Five		Andy Schuhler	NBC
2008 (36th)	The Mighty B!	"Name Shame"	Eddie Trigueros	Nickelodeon
2008 (36th)	The Fairly OddParents	"Mission: Responsible"	Butch Hartman	Nickelodeon
2009 (37th)
2009 (37th)	Merry Madagascar		Robert Koo	NBC
2009 (37th)	The Mighty B!	"Catatonic"	Sunil Hall	Nickelodeon
2009 (37th)	The Fairly OddParents	"Fly Boy"	Brandon Kruse	Nickelodeon
2009 (37th)	Prep & Landing		Joe Mateo	ABC
2009 (37th)	The Spectacular Spider-Man	"Final Curtain"	Adam Van Wyk	Disney XD

=== 2010s ===
Year	Program	Episode(s)	Recipient(s)	Network
2010 (38th)
2010 (38th)	T.U.F.F. Puppy		Fred Gonzales	Nickelodeon
2010 (38th)	Scared Shrekless		Sean Bishop	NBC
2010 (38th)	Kung Fu Panda Holiday		Tom Owens	NBC
2010 (38th)	The Fairly OddParents		Dave Thomas	Nickelodeon
2011 (39th)
2011 (39th)	Prep & Landing: Naughty vs. Nice		Brian Kesinger	ABC
2011 (39th)	Regular Show		Benton Connor	Cartoon Network
2011 (39th)	Adventure Time		Rebecca Sugar	Cartoon Network
2011 (39th)	Prep & Landing: Naughty vs. Nice		Barry W. Johnson	ABC
2011 (39th)	Prep & Landing: Naughty vs. Nice		Joe Mateo	ABC
2011 (39th)	T.U.F.F. Puppy		Dave Thomas	Nickelodeon
2011 (39th)	T.U.F.F. Puppy		Fred Gonzalez	Nickelodeon
2011 (39th)	Fanboy & Chum Chum		Justin Nichols	Nickelodeon
2011 (39th)	Fanboy & Chum Chum		Katie Rice	Nickelodeon
2012 (40th)
2012 (40th)	Dragons: Riders of Berk	"Portrait of Hiccup as a Buff Man"	Doug Lovelace	Cartoon Network
2012 (40th)	Doc McStuffins	"Righty-on-Lefty"	Andy Kelly	Disney Junior
2012 (40th)	Adventure Time	"Lady & Peebles"	Cole Sanchez, Rebecca Sugar	Cartoon Network
2012 (40th)	Adventure Time	"Goliad"	Tom Herpich, Skyler Page	Cartoon Network
2012 (40th)	Sofia the First	"Once Upon a Princess"	Holly Forsyth	Disney Junior / Disney Channel
2012 (40th)	Teenage Mutant Ninja Turtles	"I Think His Name is Baxter Stockman"	Irineo Valley, Ciro Nieli	Nickelodeon
2012 (40th)	Kung Fu Panda: Legends of Awesomeness	"Enter the Dragon"	Ryan Kramer, Paul Linsley, Kenji Ono, Alice Herring, Mike Mullen, Aaron Hammersley	Nickelodeon
2012 (40th)	Tron: Uprising	"The Reward"	Robert Valley, Kalvin Lee	Disney XD
2013 (41st)
2013 (41st)	Toy Story of Terror!		Daniel Chong	ABC
2013 (41st)	Archer		Adam Ford, Deke Wightman, Kevin Mellon, Justin Wagner, Benji Williams	FX
2013 (41st)	Mickey Mouse		Alonso Ramos-Ramirez	Disney Channel
2013 (41st)	Gravity Falls		Alonso Ramos-Ramirez	Disney Channel
2013 (41st)	Monsters vs. Aliens		Piero Piluso	Nickelodeon
2013 (41st)	The Simpsons	"Treehouse of Horror XXIV"	Guillermo del Toro, Guy Davis, Ralph Sosa	Fox
2013 (41st)	Dragons: Riders of Berk		Douglas Lovelace	Cartoon Network
2013 (41st)	Justin Time		Paul Watling	Family Jr.
2014 (42nd)
2014 (42nd)	The Legend of Korra		Joaquim Dos Santos	Nickelodeon
2014 (42nd)	Mickey Mouse		Heiko Drengenberg	Disney Channel
2014 (42nd)	Gravity Falls		Luke Weber, Alonso Ramirez Ramos, Neil Graf, Steve Heneveld	Disney Channel
2014 (42nd)	Wander Over Yonder		Mark Ackland	Disney Channel
2014 (42nd)	Star Wars Rebels		Nathaniel Villanueva, Douglas Lovelace	Disney XD
2014 (42nd)	The Simpsons		Brad Ableson, Matthew Faughnan, Stephen Reis	Fox
2014 (42nd)	Toy Story That Time Forgot		Louise Symthe	ABC
2015 (43rd)
2015 (43rd)	Mickey Mouse	"¡Feliz Cumpleaños!"	Alonso Ramirez Ramos	Disney Channel
2015 (43rd)	Adventure Time	"Walnuts & Rain"	Tom Herpich	Cartoon Network
2015 (43rd)	We Bare Bears	"Burrito"	Madeline Sharafian, Manny Hernandez, Bert Youn	Cartoon Network
2015 (43rd)	Steven Universe	"Jail Break"	Joe Johnston, Jeff Liu, Rebecca Sugar	Cartoon Network
2015 (43rd)	Dragons: Race of the Edge	"Eye of the Beholder (Part 1 and 2)"	Heidi Jo Gilbert	Netflix
2015 (43rd)	The Adventures of Puss in Boots	"Hidden"	Ben Juwono	Netflix
2015 (43rd)	Niko and the Sword of Light	"Pilot"	Sung Jin Ahn, Ben Juwono, David Woo, Donna Lee	Prime Video
2015 (43rd)	Wander Over Yonder	"The Breakfast"	Justin Nichols	Disney Channel
2016 (44th)
2016 (44th)	Trollhunters: Tales of Arcadia	"Win, Lose or Draal"	Hyunjoo Song	Netflix
2016 (44th)	Atomic Puppet	"Sick Day"	Kyle Marshall	Disney XD / Netflix
2016 (44th)	Mickey Mouse	"Road Hogs"	Heiko Von Drengenberg	Disney Channel
2016 (44th)	The Adventures of Puss in Boots	"Prey Time"	Ben Juwono	Netflix
2016 (44th)	Milo Murphy's Law	"Going the Extra Milo"	Dan Povenmire, Kyle Menke	Disney XD
2017 (45th)
2017 (45th)	Mickey Mouse	"Bee Inspired"	Eddie Trigueros	Disney Channel
2017 (45th)	Home: Adventures with Tip & Oh	"Home for the Holidays"	Ben Bury	Netflix
2017 (45th)	Trollhunters: Tales of Arcadia	"Hero with a Thousand Faces"	David Woo	Netflix
2017 (45th)	Trollhunters: Tales of Arcadia	"In the Hall of the Gumm-Gumm King"	Hyunjoo Song	Netflix
2017 (45th)	Niko and the Sword of Light	"From the Phantom Woods to the Mountains of Misery"	Kim Arndt, Alexandria Kwan	Prime Video
2018 (46th)
2018 (46th)	Mickey Mouse	"Carnaval"	Alonso Ramirez Ramos	Disney Channel
2018 (46th)	Rise of the Teenage Mutant Ninja Turtles	"Mystic Mayhem"	Kevin Molina-Ortiz	Nickelodeon
2018 (46th)	Ben 10	"King Koil"	Will Patrick	Cartoon Network
2018 (46th)	Big Hero 6: The Series	"Countdown to Catastrophe"	Trey Buongiorno	Disney Channel
2018 (46th)	Star vs. the Forces of Evil	"Conquer"	Sage Cotugno (Note: Nominated as Sabrina Cotugno; Cotugno is non-binary and announced their name change in 2023.)	Disney XD
2019 (47th)
2019 (47th)	Carmen Sandiego	"Becoming Carmen Sandiego, Part 1"	Kenny Park	Netflix
2019 (47th)	Snoopy in Space	"Mission 6: Space Sleepwalking"	Riccardo Durante	Apple TV+
2019 (47th)	Carole & Tuesday	"True Colors"	Shinichirō Watanabe	Netflix
2019 (47th)	Love, Death & Robots	"Sucker of Souls"	Owen Sullivan	Netflix
2019 (47th)	Zog		Max Lang	Magic Light Pictures

=== 2020s ===
Year	Program	Episode(s)	Recipient(s)	Network
2020 (48th)
2020 (48th)	Looney Tunes Cartoons		Andrew Dickman	HBO Max
2020 (48th)	Archibald's Next Big Thing	"Baritone Tea Part 1"	Ben McLaughlin	Netflix
2020 (48th)	Big City Greens	"Cheap Show"	Kiana Khansmith	Disney Channel
2020 (48th)	Mortal Kombat Legends: Scorpion's Revenge		Milo Neuman	Warner Bros. Animation
2020 (48th)	Shroom's Oddysey		Julien Bisaro	Picolo Pictures
2021 (49th)
2021 (49th)	Arcane	"When These Walls Come Tumbling Down"	Simon Andriveau	Netflix
2021 (49th)	Invincible	"Where I Really Come From"	Jay Baker	Prime Video
2021 (49th)	Kid Cosmic	"The Big Win"	Justin Nichols	Netflix
2021 (49th)	Love, Death + Robots	"Pop Squad"	Jennifer Yuh Nelson	Netflix
2021 (49th)	The Ghost and Molly McGee	"All Systems No"	Johnny Castuciano	Disney Channel
2022 (50th)
2022 (50th)	Love Death + Robots	"The Very Pulse of the Machine"	Emily Dean	Netflix
2022 (50th)	Cyberpunk: Edgerunners	"Let You Down"	Kaneko Yoshiyuki	Netflix
2022 (50th)	Kung Fu Panda: The Dragon Knight	"The Knight's Code"	Grace Liu	Netflix
2022 (50th)	The Cuphead Show!	"A Very Devil Christmas"	Karl Hadrika	Netflix
2022 (50th)	Looney Tunes Cartoons	"Hex Appeal"	Mike Ruocco	HBO Max
2023 (51st)
2023 (51st)	Marvel's Moon Girl and Devil Dinosaur	"Goodnight Moon Girl"	Ben Juwono	Disney Channel
2023 (51st)	Craig Before The Creek		Erik Fountain	Cartoon Network
2023 (51st)	Fright Krewe	"The Blood Awakening, Part 1"	Leah Artwick	Hulu/Peacock
2023 (51st)	Gremlins: Secrets of the Mogwai	"Never Give Up"	Kristine Lee	Max
2023 (51st)	Kung Fu Panda: The Dragon Knight	"Apok-ta-pokalypse Now, Part II"	Grace Liu	Netflix
2024 (52nd)
2024 (52nd)	Arcane	"Killing is a Cycle"	Joséphine Meis	Netflix
2024 (52nd)	Invincible Fight Girl	"The Way of the World"	Gladyfaith Abcede, Miki Brewster, Kaela Lash, Sheldon Vella	Adult Swim
2024 (52nd)	Jurassic World: Chaos Theory	"That Night"	Aevery Huens	Netflix
2024 (52nd)	Snoopy Presents: Welcome Home, Franklin		David Lux	Apple TV+
2024 (52nd)	Tales of the Teenage Mutant Ninja Turtles	"The Pearl"	Laura Gille, Sebrina Gao, Kevin Molina-Ortiz	Paramount+
2025 (53rd)
2025 (53rd)	Love, Death & Robots	"How Zeke Got Religion"	Edgar Martins	Netflix
2025 (53rd)	ParaNorman: The Thrifting		Coleton Palmer, Katherine Jay Myong, Heewon Jeong	Laika
2025 (53rd)	Snow Bear		Aaron Blaise	Aaron Blaise Studios
2025 (53rd)	Tales of the Teenage Mutant Ninja Turtles	"Rise of the Night Ninja"	Richard Chi, Matthew Kim, Sheldon Vella, Lyndsay Simpson	Paramount+
2025 (53rd)	Win or Lose	"Home"	Esteban Bravo	Disney+
