= The Brave Locomotive =

2023 American independent animated short film

- Directed by: Andrew Chesworth
- Written by: Andrew Chesworth
- Starring: Kari Shaw Akers; Morgana Hasil; Andra Suchy; Drew Jansen
- Music by: Tom Hambleton
- Production company: Andrew Chesworth Studios
- Release date: 2023
- Running time: 7 minutes
- Country: United States
- Language: English

The Brave Locomotive is a 2023 American independent animated short film by Academy Award-nominated Disney animator Andrew Chesworth.

== Summary ==
Linus is a small 2-4-0 English-American Steam Locomotive that works at the Trailway Railroad in the Western United States in the late 1890s with his engineer and good friend Henry. Their job is taking passengers to and from locations and through the mountains and a small town called Colonnaville. One day, Baron von Kapital, who has recently purchased the railroad, announces to Henry that changes are to be made to improve it. He introduces Samson, a large 4-8-4 northern-type Steam Locomotive that is to replace Linus. Henry is assigned as Samson's engineer, while Linus is reassigned to work at the Lumber Mill.

Samson soon takes over running the railroad's passenger trains, quickly improving travel time thanks to his speed and a new wooden trestle bridge built over a large canyon. Due to the speed at which Samson moves and his size allowing for coaches with more passengers, Colonnaville soon expands into a major town, but this all causes extra stress on the bridge, which was built too quickly to accommodate Samson. While passing over the bridge one day, Samson's speed causes part of it to break, leaving him dangling dangerously over the chasm. Henry whistles for help, which is heard by Linus, who rushes off to help.

Linus manages to get the coaches to safety, but Samson's tender disconnects in the process, leaving him, Henry, Von Kapital, and his daughter Katrina stranded. Linus goes back to save them, but struggles to pull Samson to safety. Henry and Katrina shovel coal into Linus' firebox, giving him enough strength to pull Samson just as the bridge collapses. This however, leaves Linus on the brink of death, until everyone helps Henry to repair him.

Linus is hailed a hero for his efforts and given his old job back, while a grateful Samson is reassigned to haul lumber. Years later, the bridge has been replaced with a steel and concrete one, the Baron has died, and modern trains now run the line. Linus runs a tourist railway on his old line, with a now elderly Henry and his wife acting as his engineers.

== Production ==
Chesworth formerly worked at Disney (being animator on Wreck-It Ralph, Frozen, Get a Horse!, Big Hero 6, Feast, Zootopia and Moana) and Netflix (on the 2019 Annie Award for Best Animated Feature winner Klaus) while working independently on his passion projects including The Brave Locomotive (first conceived in 2008; he released online in 2015 the opening sequence that was in progress before shelving it after being hired by Disney in 2011).

== Release ==
It was released to film festivals for Oscar qualification before airing on YouTube.

== Accolades ==
- LA Shorts Film Festival: Best Animation (Winner)
- UK Film Festival: Best Animation (Winner)
- Rhode Island International Film Festival: Best Short Animation (Winner)
- Best Short Fest: Best Short Animation (Winner)

== See also ==
The following Disney animated films featuring the aforementioned Andrews Sisters:

- Make Mine Music (1946)
- Melody Time (1948)
