= Unruly Heroes =

2019 video game

- Developer: Magic Design Studios
- Publisher: Magic Design Studios
- Engine: Unity
- Platforms: Nintendo Switch, Microsoft Windows, Xbox One, PlayStation 4, Android, iOS
- Release: January 23, 2019
- Genre: Platform
- Modes: Single-player, multiplayer

Unruly Heroes is a platform video game developed by Magic Design Studios for the Nintendo Switch, Microsoft Windows, Xbox One and PlayStation 4. The mobile version published by Perfect Games Speed. It is inspired by the Chinese novel Journey to the West.

== Gameplay ==
Unruly Heroes features four characters (Sanzang, Wukong, Kihong and Sandmonk), that can be switched anytime. Each of them have their own unique skills and traits, like double-jump, gliding, or powers activated by special statues. There are character-specific statues that can be used by pushing them into the right place. While the game is based on Journey to the West, it differs a lot compared to it, making an adventure that is more humorous and lighthearted. All levels are done in a Donkey Kong Country-esque way, in which the path forward is always clear, with branching paths along the way that usually lead to extra rewards. The game inherited the combo-based combat system from Prince of Persia while also using puzzles for progression, which is present in all of the 29 levels available.

Outside of a single-player adventure, the game can be played with up to four players. In the Underworld, the players will control child versions of the characters. There is also a Player versus Player mode, where battles can be done locally or online.

== Development ==
The game entered production in June 2017. Since a part of the French company Magic Design Studios has worked for Ubisoft on Rayman Legends, there are some similarities in the hand-drawn art style. During development, each level (using the Unity engine) was split into separate scenes so that the multiple people would work on it at the same time.

== Reception ==
=== Accolades ===
The game won the award for "Best Character Animation - Video Game" at the 47th Annie Awards, and was nominated for "Best 1st Game" at the Pégases Awards 2020.
