= Uncle Thomas: Accounting for the Days =

2019 Canadian short film

- Film poster
- Tio Tomás, A Contabilidade Dos Dias
- Directed by: Regina Pessoa
- Produced by: Reginald de Guillebon; Abi Feijó; Julie Roy
- Starring: Regina Pessoa
- Edited by: Abi Feijó
- Music by: Normand Roger
- Production companies: Ciclope Filmes; Les Armateurs; National Film Board of Canada
- Release date: June 4, 2019 (Animafest Zagreb)
- Running time: 13 minutes
- Countries: Canada; Portugal; France

Uncle Thomas: Accounting for the Days (Portuguese: Tio Tomás, A Contabilidade Dos Dias) is a 2019 Canadian-Portuguese-French co-produced animated short film, directed by Regina Pessoa. The film is a tribute to Pessoa's real-life uncle Tomás, who suffered from obsessive compulsive disorder but was a key inspiration on her decision to pursue a career in the arts.

== Plot ==
This story is presented in the form of a letter written to a young woman's uncle, Uncle Thomas, who is described as "strange," as he had no regular job, wife, or children. All the while he is fascinating, extraordinary, and trustworthy to the girl. The story is interspersed with the voice-over of Uncle Thomas as he reads tables of numbers, describes the importance of being meticulously clean, details the ordeal of his daily routine, instructs on how to draw a face, and talks about other aspects of his life story. While it is not stated, it appears Uncle Thomas suffers some sort of mental health disorder, possibly obsessive-compulsive disorder (OCD). His obsession with numbers, in particular, is evident in the stylistic animation, such as numbers falling out of his clothes when getting dressed or spewing out of his motorcycle's tailpipe.

It seems the young girl and her Uncle Thomas enjoy spending time together writing, drawing, and riding on a motorcycle out in the countryside.

We learn that Uncle Thomas once had a girlfriend, but it seems he broke off the relationship, possibly due to a tormenting spiral of obsession with numbers at the time. Simultaneous with this episode, the young girl tried to visit Uncle Thomas, but he refused to see her and said he was broken down that day. The girl came to realize that something had gone wrong with Uncle Thomas, suggesting some sort of mental breakdown. She interprets the psychological collapse as the result of Uncle Thomas carrying emotional burdens and unable to solve his family's problems by way of incessantly looking for meaning and answers in numbers.

In the end, it is apparent that a great distance has grown between Uncle Thomas and the young girl, though she was able to tell him she loved him one last time before he died.

== Awards ==
The film won a Jury Prize at the Annecy International Animated Film Festival, and won the Annie Award for Best Animated Short Subject at the 47th Annie Awards. It made the initial shortlist for the Academy Award for Best Animated Short Film for the 92nd Academy Awards, but did not advance to the final five nominees.

The film received a Canadian Screen Award nomination for Best Animated Short at the 8th Canadian Screen Awards in 2020.
