= 30th Annie Awards =

US media awards ceremony held in 2003

30th
Annie Awards

February 1, 2003

Best Feature Film:
Spirited Away

Best Television Program:
The Simpsons

Best Home Video Production:
Rolie Polie Olie: The Great Defender of Fun

Best Short Subject:
The Tortoise and the Hare

The 30th Annual Annie Awards honoring excellence in the field of animation of 2002 were held on February 1, 2003, in California, USA.

== Production nominees ==
| Best Animated Feature | Best Animated Television Production |
|---|---|
| Spirited Away – Studio Ghibli: Ice Age – 20th Century Fox/Blue Sky Studios; Lilo & Stitch – Walt Disney Pictures; Monsters, Inc. – Pixar; Spirit: Stallion of the Cimarron – DreamWorks | The Simpsons – Gracie Films in association with 20th Century Fox Television: Kim Possible – Walt Disney Television Animation; The Flintstones: On the Rocks – Cartoon Network Studios; Futurama – The Curiosity Company in association with 20th Century Fox Television; Invader Zim – Nickelodeon |
| Best Animated Home Video Production | Best Animated Short Subject |
| Rolie Polie Olie: The Great Defender of Fun – A Nelvana Limited/Sparkling* Co-Production: The Land Before Time IX: Journey to Big Water – Universal Cartoon Studios; VeggieTales: The Star of Christmas – Big Idea Productions | The Tortoise and the Hare – Ray Harryhausen & Screen Novelties International: Night of the Living Doo – Cartoon Network; The Groovenians – Cartoon Network Studios |
| Best Animated Television Commercial | Best Animated Television Production Produced for Children |
| Courage – Cartoon Network – Cartoon Network: Arrow – Lugz Shoes – Psyop; Catch – AT&T – Acme Filmworks; Don't Mess – Dodge – Renegade Animation; Every Move You Make – Sinai Hospital – Acme Filmworks | Rolie Polie Olie – A Nelvana Limited/Sparkling* Co-Production: Kim Possible – Walt Disney Television Animation; The Proud Family – Jambalaya Studios; Rocket Power – Klasky Csupo; Stanley – Cartoon Pizza, Inc. |

== Outstanding individual achievements ==
| Character Animation | Character Design in an Animated Feature Production |
|---|---|
| Doug Sweetland – "Monsters, Inc.": John Kahrs – "Monsters, Inc."; Alex Kupershmidt – "Lilo & Stitch"; Sergio Pablos – "Treasure Planet"; Mike Thurmeier – "Ice Age" | Carlos Grangel – "Spirit: Stallion of the Cimarron": Peter de Sève – "Ice Age"; Peter de Sève – "Treasure Planet"; Chris Sanders – "Lilo & Stitch"; Ricky Vega Nierva – "Monsters, Inc." |
| Character Design in an Animated Television Production | Directing in an Animated Feature Production |
| Lynne Naylor-Reccardi – "Samurai Jack Episode VI": Alex Kirwan – "Time Squad – Mission JX4435: Clown Squad"; Dave Kupczyk – "Ozzy & Drix"; Paul Rudish – "The Powerpuff Girls – "Members Only""; Shannon Tindle – "The Proud Family – Forbidden Date" | Hayao Miyazaki – "Spirited Away": Ron Clements, John Musker – "Treasure Planet"; Dean DeBlois, Chris Sanders – "Lilo & Stitch"; Pete Docter, Lee Unkrich, David Silverman – "Monsters, Inc."; Chris Wedge (director), Carlos Saldanha (co-director) – "Ice Age" |
