= Adam and Dog =

- Directed by: Minkyu Lee
- Written by: Minkyu Lee
- Distributed by: ShortsHD
- Release date: 2011
- Running time: 16 minutes
- Country: United States

Adam and Dog is a 2011 American animated short film by Minkyu Lee. The film was nominated for Best Animated Short Film for the 85th Academy Awards and won Best Animated Short Subject at the 39th Annie Awards.

After being nominated for an Academy Award, the film was released along with all the other 15 Oscar-nominated short films in theaters by ShortsHD.

== Plot ==
The film is a retelling of Adam and Eve's story (as found in the first three chapters of the Book of Genesis) from Dog's point of view. Dog is shown in the Garden of Eden, exploring its environment and encountering various animals. Its doggy nature is revealed in various scenes from territory marking to barking at a passing mastodon to attempting to befriend a lemur. One day in the savanna, it encounters the newly created Adam who is also exploring Eden. Adam feeds Dog some grains, pets it and moves on. The next day, Adam is high up on a tree, interacting with a bird, when Dog sees him again. Adam tosses down a fruit to Dog and climbs down.

He is surprised that Dog is fascinated by the branch (now stripped of fruit) he is holding. When he throws the branch away, Dog fetches it back. Dog is excited when Adam (who knows all animal languages) barks like it. They become friends and explore Eden together. One day, Dog sees Adam with a new creature, Eve with long red hair. Dog attempts to interest Adam in a game of fetch but Adam throws the stick extremely far away in order to get rid of Dog. When Dog returns with the stick, Adam and Eve are gone. Dog waits all day for him to return. At night, Dog (with stick) wanders Eden and sees a panther with a dead rabbit in its mouth. It starts to rain. Dog then sees Adam and Eve, wearing clothes, running through the forest. He chases after them, barking joyously but when Adam turns around, his face is so distorted and sinister, Dog runs away terrified.

Other animals also flee them. Adam and Eve stop and turn away from one another. They look ashamed, dejected and alone. The next day, Adam and Eve emerge from Eden and enter a bleak desert. They are clothed in rough animal fur. Dog sees them leave, takes a step out of Eden, pauses and then returns to Eden. It then dashes out with the stick in its mouth and runs towards them. In the last scene, Dog lays the stick at a surprised Adam's feet. Adam kneels down and pets Dog and tells Eve who Dog is. Eve kneels down in front of Dog and hugs and kisses it. Adam and Eve walk off together. They are holding hands and so close they seem like one person. Dog walks right by their side.
