= I'm Going Out for Cigarettes =

- Directed by: Osman Cerfon
- Written by: Osman Cerfon
- Produced by: Emmanuel-Alain Raynal, Pierre Baussaron
- Distributed by: Miyu Distribution
- Release date: August 4, 2018 (Locarno Film Festival)
- Running time: 13 minutes
- Country: France

I'm Going Out for Cigarettes (French: Je Sors Acheter des Cigarettes) is a 2018 animated short film directed by Osman Cerfon. The film has been nominated and awarded in many festivals including Locarno International Film Festival and the Animator International Animated Film Festival where it received the Oscar-qualifying Grand Jury Prize.

It was nominated at the 47th Annie Awards in the Best Animated Short Subject category and at the 45th César Award ceremony.

== Plot ==
Jonathan, who is twelve years old, lives with his sister, his mother and also some men. They all have the same face and nest in closets, drawers, TV set.

== Awards and nominations ==
Since its launch the film has been selected in more than 140 festivals worldwide.

Year	Presenter/Festival	Award/Category	Status
2018	Locarno International Film Festival	International Competition	Nominated
2018	Locarno International Film Festival	Medien Patent Verwaltung AG Award	Won
2019	IndieLisboa International Independent Film Festival	International Competition	Nominated
2019	Festival Anima	Special Jury Award	Won
2019	SXSW Film Festival	SXSW Grand Jury Award - Animated Film	Nominated
2019	Clermont-Ferrand International Short Film Festival	Grand Prix - National Competition	Nominated
2019	Champs-Élysées Film Festival	Jury Prize - National Competition	Nominated
2019	Animafest Zagreb	Grand Competition Short Film	Nominated
2019	Animator International Animated Film Festival	Grand Jury Prize	Won
2019	PÖFF Black Nights	International Animation Competition	Nominated
2019	KROK International Animated Films Festival	Best film in Films of 10-50 minutes competition	Won
2019	GLAS Animation Festival	Official Competition	Nominated
2020	Annie Awards	Best Animated Short Subject	Nominated

== See also ==
- 2018 in film
