= The Story of The Tortoise & the Hare =

- Directed by: Ray Harryhausen
- Based on: The Tortoise and the Hare by Aesop
- Produced by: Ray Harryhausen; Mark Caballero; Seamus Walsh
- Narrated by: Gary Owens
- Production company: Screen Novelties
- Release date: 2002
- Running time: 12 minutes
- Country: United States
- Language: English

The Story of The Tortoise & the Hare is a 2002 stop motion short film directed and animated by Ray Harryhausen. It is based on the Aesop fable The Tortoise and the Hare.

== Production ==
Harryhausen began making the film in 1952, but abandoned it soon after, with only about 4 minutes of film completed. Around 50 years later, Seamus Walsh and Mark Caballero, two young fans of Harryhausen's work, learned about the unfinished film and asked Harryhausen if they could finish it with him. He said yes and the short was finally completed in 2002, 50 whole years since Harryhausen had started the production. With the exception of the tortoise, all of the original models were reused due to their survival through the years. Gary Owens narrated the film.

== Accolades ==
Award	Category	Recipient	Result
Annie Awards	Outstanding Achievement in an Animated Short Subject	Ray Harryhausen	Won

== See also ==
- 2002 in film
- List of rediscovered films
- List of films with longest production time
