= Andrew Chesworth =

American animator

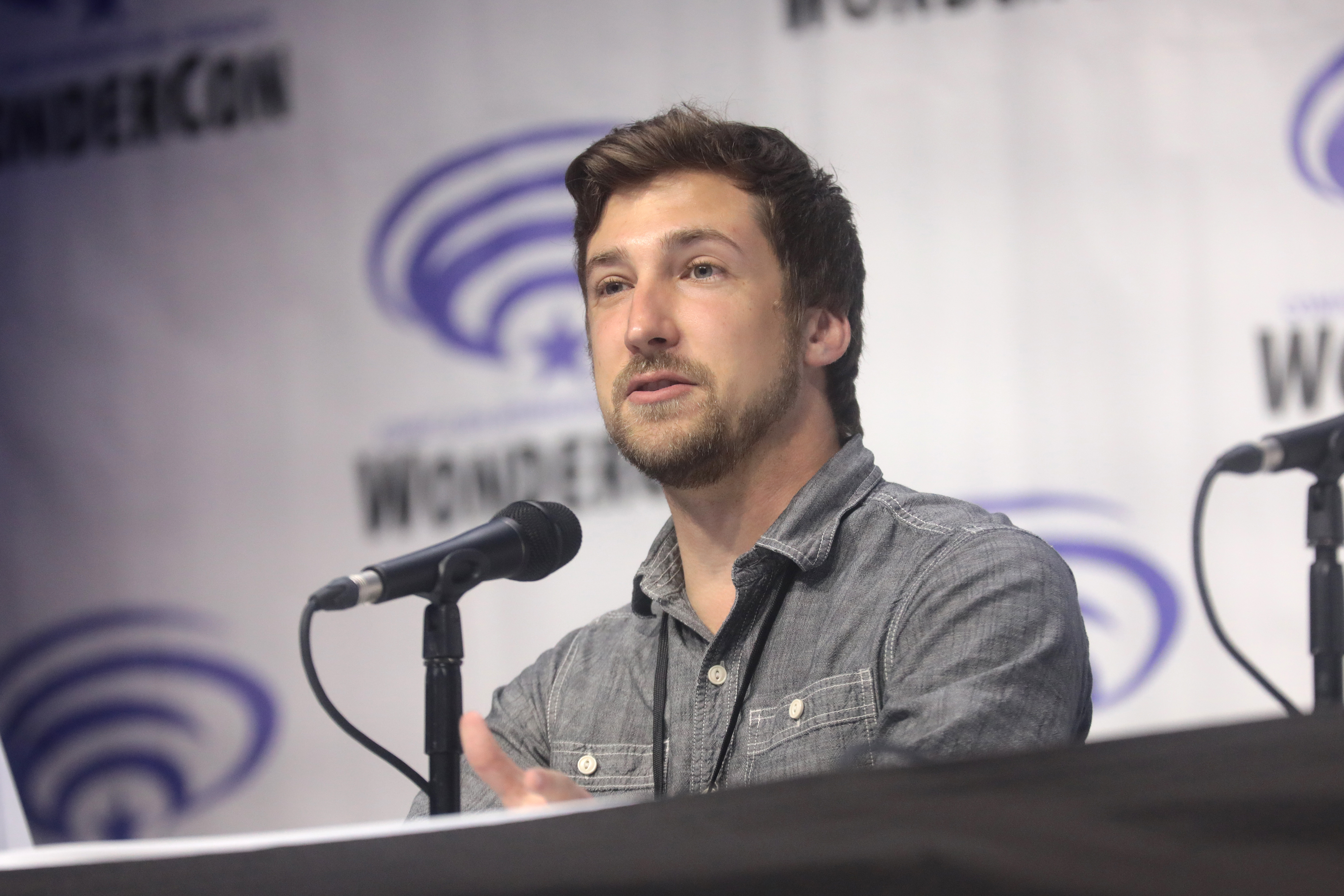
Andrew Chesworth speaking at the 2019 WonderCon, for "The Animation Show of Shows", at the Anaheim Convention Center in Anaheim, California.

Andrew Chesworth is an American animator known for his 2018 Oscar-nominated short One Small Step (with co-director Bobby Pontillas at Taiko Studios) and his 2023 Oscar-qualifying effort The Brave Locomotive.

== Career ==
He formerly worked at Disney (being animator on Wreck-It Ralph, Frozen, Get a Horse!, Big Hero 6, Feast, Zootopia and Moana) and Netflix (on the 2019 Annie Award for Best Animated Feature winner Klaus) while working independently on his passion projects including The Brave Locomotive (he released online in 2015 the opening sequence that was in progress before shelving it after being hired by Disney).

== Accolades ==
- One Small Step - Academy Award for Best Animated Short Film (nominated)
- The Brave Locomotive - LA Shorts Film Festival: Best Animation (won)
