= A Sparrow's Song =

2025 German animated short film

- Directed by: Tobias Eckerlin
- Production company: Filmakademie Baden-Württemberg
- Release date: 2025
- Running time: 9 minutes
- Country: Germany

A Sparrow's Song is a 2025 German animated short film written and directed by Tobias Eckerlin and produced by the Filmakademie Baden-Württemberg. The 9-minutes animated film about war, loneliness and grief has been awarded by the Academy of Motion Picture Arts & Sciences by winning the Golden Medal at the Student Academy Award in 2025.

== Plot ==
During World War II, a widow tries to overcome her sorrow and find hope in her life, until she encounters a sparrow on its deathbed that she'll try to rescue.

== Accolades ==
Since its release, the film has been selected in various festivals around the world:

Year	Festivals	Award/Category	Status
2025	Student Academy Award	Gold Medal - Best Animated Short Film	Won
2025	BAFTA Student Film Awards	Best Animated Short Film	Nominated
2025	Calgary International Film Festival	Grand Jury Prize – Best Overall Short Film	Won
2025	Festival Internacional de Animacion	Grand Jury Prize	Won
2025	Festival Internacional de Animacion	Best Student Short Film	Won
2025	Festival International Gbaka Animation	2nd Price GBAKA NATIONAL AWARDS	Won
2025	The Rookies 2025	Film of the Year	Nominated
