= Kkum =

South Korean black and white animated short film

- Directed by: Kim Kang-min
- Written by: Kim Kang-min
- Production company: Kijin Kim
- Release date: 2020
- Running time: 9 minutes
- Country: South Korea
- Language: Korean
- Budget: $80

Kkum (Korean: 꿈; lit. 'Dream') is a South Korean intimate black and white animated short film made in a minimal set design with Styrofoam in stop-motion. Seoul-born, Los Angeles-based independent director Kim Kang-min confessed using this material because it is inexpensive and fit his $80 budget. This Oscar-qualified short is the first Korean to take grand prize at OIAF and the 3rd film in Ottawa history to win both top short and public prize.

== Plot ==
With prayers in the daytime and dreams at night, a mother protects her son. The mother's become premonitions to the point of devotion.

== Voice cast ==
- Kim Kang-min as himself.
- Park Joung-soon as the mother. Kang-min's real mother provided her own voice for the project.

== Accolades ==
Year	Presenter/Festival	Award/Category	Status
2020	Ottawa International Animation Festival	Public Prize	Won
2020	Ottawa International Animation Festival	Nelvana Grand Prize for Independent Short animation	Won
