= Bye Sweet Carole =

2025 video game

- Developer: Little Sewing Machine
- Publisher: Maximum Entertainment
- Director: Chris Darril
- Platforms: Nintendo Switch; PlayStation 5; Windows; Xbox Series X/S
- Release: October 9, 2025
- Genre: Action-adventure game
- Mode: Single-player

Bye Sweet Carole is an action-adventure game developed by Little Sewing Machine, in collaboration with Meangrip Game Studios and Dreams Uncorporated, and published by Maximum Entertainment. It released for Nintendo Switch, PlayStation 5, Windows and Xbox Series X/S in October 2025. The game draws inspiration from traditional animation, particularly early Disney films such as Snow White and the Seven Dwarfs.

== Gameplay ==
Bye Sweet Carole is a side-scrolling adventure game, in which the player controls Lana Benton, a young orphan girl, as she explores the Bunny Hall orphanage in search of clues as to the whereabouts of her friend Carole. The game has no traditional combat, and Lana must instead hide from enemies to stay alive. If caught, the player may perform quick time events to escape. Early on in the game, Lana also gains the ability to shapeshift into rabbit form, allowing her to fit through smaller gaps, jump off walls and move faster.

== Plot ==
Set in early 1900s England, an orphan named Lana Benton searches for her missing friend, Carole.

== Development ==
Lead developer Chris Darril previously made Remothered.

== Reception ==
Reception

Aggregate scores
Aggregator	Score
Metacritic	(PS5) 74/100 (PC) 69/100
OpenCritic	47% recommend

Review score
Publication	Score
Nintendo Life	7/10

According to review aggregator platform Metacritic, the Windows, PlayStation 5, and Xbox Series X/S versions of Bye Sweet Carole received "mixed or average" reviews. Fellow review aggregator OpenCritic assessed that the game received fair approval, being recommended by 47% of critics. Nintendo Life praised the art style and storytelling, but they felt the gameplay was frustrating and called the character animations stiff. Slant Magazine called it "insipid and obvious" and said children are likely to find it boring. but, on the other hand, Adventure Game Hotspot called it a "stunningly beautiful adventure that hops between intense encounters and a deeply emotional narrative ... an incredibly special game that will stick with me for a long time."

Bye Sweet Carole received a Webby Award, was the first Italian video game to be nominated for an Annie Award, and received six nominations at the NAVGTR Awards.

In less than two months since its release, total sales across all platforms have exceeded 100,000 units.
