= One Small Step (film) =

2018 short film

- Film poster
- Directed by: Andrew Chesworth; Bobby Pontillas
- Written by: Andrew Chesworth; Shaofu Zhang; Trent Correy
- Produced by: Shaofu Zhang
- Cinematography: Andrew Chesworth
- Edited by: Shaofu Zhang
- Music by: Steve Horner
- Production company: Taiko Studios
- Release date: June 25, 2018 (PSIFF)
- Running time: 8 minutes
- Countries: China; United States

One Small Step is a 2018 Chinese-American animated short film by Andrew Chesworth and Bobby Pontillas and produced by Taiko Studios.

== Summary ==
Luna is a vibrant young Chinese American girl who dreams of becoming an astronaut. From the day she witnesses a rocket launching into space on TV, Luna is driven to reach for the stars. Her single father, a shoe repairman, gifts her a pair of astronaut-themed boots for her sixth birthday.

Years later, Luna is a young adult studying astrophysics while living with her father. The two have drifted apart over the years as Luna's studies have taken up more of her time, causing her to ignore his attempts to bond. Their relationship is further strained by Luna's academic struggles and eventual rejection from an astronaut candidacy program. One day, Luna comes home from school and finds that her father has died. His death sends her into a depression and she soon abandons her dreams.

Soon after, while organizing, Luna finds a box containing all the shoes she's ever owned, which her father had saved over the years. Reinvigorated, she reapplies herself to her studies and graduates from school. She is accepted into the astronaut program after applying once more. Sometime later, Luna lands on the Moon on her first space mission. She watches the sunrise on Earth and smiles as she remembers her father.

== Development ==
Trent Correy developed the original concept for One Small Step.

== Accolades ==
Nominated: 91st Academy Awards - Academy Award for Best Animated Short Film

== See also ==
- 2018 in film
- "One small step", title namesake, 1969 quote by Neil Armstrong
- List of female astronauts
