= Snow Bear =

2025 United-States animated short film

- Directed by: Aaron Blaise
- Produced by: Nicholas Burch
- Music by: Mark Mancina; Marlon E. Espino
- Production company: Aaron Blaise Studios
- Release date: November 28, 2025
- Running time: 11 minutes
- Country: United States

{{For|the animal|Polar bear}}

Snow Bear is a 2025 American animated short film written and directed by Aaron Blaise (known for the 2003 Academy Award-nominated feature Brother Bear). The 11-minute wordless animated film following the life of a lonely polar bear was selected in various international film festivals, including the Annecy Film Festival, the Tribeca Film Festival and Animafest Zagreb. The film was entirely animated by Aaron Blaise himself over the span of three years.

Snow Bear is currently available to watch on Blaise's YouTube channel.

It was shortlisted for the 98th Academy Awards in the category of Best Animated Short Film.

== Plot ==
A lonely male polar bear named Glen lives on an unforgivable ice floe in the Arctic. After failing to befriend an arctic fox, an orca and some Canada geese, he decides to create his own out of snow. He spends his days with it watching the aurora borealis, playing hide-and-seek, eating seals, sliding down snowbanks and even imitating nearby walruses together.

One morning, the snow-made bear starts melting. Glen tries to save it, but is unable to. Eventually, after mourning the loss of his "friend", he discovers an Arctic island with green grass. While exploring, Glen discovers another snow-made bear made by a female polar bear named Luma. The two become mates and make another snow bear to be friends with Luma’s snow bear.

== Accolades ==
Since its release, the film has been selected in various festivals around the world:

Year	Festivals	Award/Category	Status
2025	Annecy International Animation Film Festival	Young Audience Award	Nominated
2025	Cleveland International Film Festival	Best Family Short Audience Choice Award	Won
2025	Animafest Zagreb	Best Film for Children and Youth	Won
2025	El Festival Internacional de Cine en Guadalajara (FICG)	Rigo Mora Prize	Nominated
2025	Hollyshorts Film Festival	Best Animated Short	Nominated
2025	Tribeca Film Festival	Best Animated Short	Nominated
2025	San Francisco Film Festival	Family Short Award	Nominated
2025	Santa Fe International Film Festival	Best Animated Short Jury Award	Won
2025	Jackson Wild	Planet in Crisis Award - Short Form	Won
2026	Annie Awards	Best Animated Short Subject	Won
2026	Annie Awards	Outstanding Achievement for Storyboarding in an Animated Television/Broadcast Production (for Aaron Blaise)	Nominated

== See also ==
- List of submissions for the Academy Award for Best Animated Short Film
