= 47th Annie Awards =

US media awards ceremony held in 2020

- Date: January 25, 2020
- Site: Royce Hall; Los Angeles, California, U.S.
- Organized by: ASIFA-Hollywood

Highlights
- Best Animated Feature: Klaus
- Best Direction: Sergio Pablos; Klaus
- Most awards: Klaus (7)
- Most nominations: Frozen 2 and Missing Link (8)

The 47th ceremony of the Annie Awards, honoring excellence in the field of animation for the year of 2019, took place on January 25, 2020, at the University of California, Los Angeles's Royce Hall in Los Angeles, California, in 37 categories.

== Productions Categories ==
On December 2, 2019, the nominations were announced. Frozen 2 and Missing Link earned the most number of nominations with 8, followed by Klaus with 7, which won all of the awards for which it was nominated.

Best Animated Feature	Best Animated Feature — Independent
Klaus — Sergio Pablos Animation Studios; How to Train Your Dragon: The Hidden World — DreamWorks Animation; Frozen 2 — Walt Disney Animation Studios; Missing Link — Laika; Toy Story 4 — Pixar Animation Studios	I Lost My Body — Xilam Animation; Buñuel in the Labyrinth of the Turtles — Sygnatia, Glow, Submarine Hampa Animation Studio; Okko's Inn — Madhouse; Promare — TRIGGER, XFLAG; Weathering with You — Toho Co., LTD. / STORY Inc. / CoMix Wave Films
Best Animated Special Production	Best Animated Short Subject
How to Train Your Dragon Homecoming — DreamWorks Animation; Guava Island Titles and Prologue — Six Point Harness / Amazon; Infinity Train The Perennial Child — Cartoon Network Studios; SpongeBob SquarePants SpongeBob's Big Birthday Blowout — Nickelodeon and Jonas & Co; Zog — Magic Light Pictures	Uncle Thomas: Accounting for the Days — Ciclope Filmes, National Film Board of Canada, Les Armateurs; Acid Rain — Animoon; DONT KNOW WHAT — Thomas Renoldner; Je sors acheter des cigarettes — Miyu Productions; Purpleboy — Bando à Parte, Rainbox Productions, Ambiances... asbl, Luna Blue Film
Best Virtual Reality Production	Best Animated Television/Broadcast Commercial
Bonfire — Baobab Studios; GLOOMY EYES — ATLAS V; Kaiju Confidential — ShadowMachine	The Mystical Journey of Jimmy Page's ‘59 Telecaster — Nexus Studios; Dove Self-Esteem Project x Steven Universe: “Social Media” — Cartoon Network / Dove / Chromosphere; Fortnite Season 7 Launch Spot — Epic Games / Screen Novelties / iam8bit
Best Animated Television/Broadcast Production for Preschool Children	Best Animated Television/Broadcast Production for Children
Ask the StoryBots — JibJab Bros. Studios for Netflix; Elena of Avalor — Disney Television Animation; Let's Go Luna! — Brown Bag Films / 9 Story Media Group; Norman Picklestripes — Factory; Xavier Riddle and the Secret Museum — Brown Bag Films / 9 Story Media Group	Mickey Mouse — Disney Television Animation / Disney Channel; Niko and the Sword of Light — Titmouse, Inc. / Amazon Studios; Rise of the Teenage Mutant Ninja Turtles — Nickelodeon Animation Studio; 3Below: Tales of Arcadia — DreamWorks Animation; The Tom and Jerry Show — Warner Bros. Animation
Best General Audience Animated Television/Broadcast Production	Best Student Film
BoJack Horseman — Tornante Productions, LLC for Netflix; Big Mouth — Netflix; Harley Quinn — Warner Bros. Animation; Tuca & Bertie — Tornante Productions, LLC for Netflix; Undone — Tornante Company and Amazon Studios	The Fox & The Pigeon — Michelle Chua, Sheridan College; Con Fuerza — Andrés Eduardo and Alejandro M. Siegert, Savannah College of Art and Design; Gravedad — Matisse Gonzalez and Toufik Abdedaim, Matisse Gonzalez, Filmakademie Baden-Württemberg GmbH Animationsinstitut; Un diable dans la poche — Antoine BONNET & Mathilde LOUBES, GOBELINS, l'école de l'image

== Individual achievement categories ==
Outstanding Achievement for Animated Effects in an Animated Television/Broadcast Production	Outstanding Achievement for Animated Effects in an Animated Production
Viktor Németh, Szabolcs Illés, Ádám Sipos, Vladimir Zhovna – Love, Death & Robots – Blur Studio / Netflix Studios; Manuel Reyes Halaby, Cristiana Covone, Koya Masubuchi, Jean Claude Nouchy, Dustin Henning – How to Train Your Dragon: Homecoming – DreamWorks Animation; Stéphane Coëdel, Natan Moura – My Moon – Eusong Lee, Co-produced with Chromosphere; Araiza Tokumasu Naoki – Star Wars Galaxy of Adventures – Lucasfilm / Titmouse, Inc; Greg Lev, Igor Lodeiro, Chen Ling, Brandon Tyra – 3Below: Tales of Arcadia – DreamWorks Animation	Benjamin Fiske, Alex Moaveni, Jesse Erickson, Dimitre Berberov, Kee Nam Suong – Frozen 2 – Walt Disney Animation Studios; Amaury Aubel, James Jackson, Domin Lee, Michael Losure, Alex Timchenko – Abominable – DreamWorks Animation; Eric Wachtman, David Horsley, Peter Stuart, Timur Khodzhaev, Joe Strasser – Missing Link – Laika; Alexis Angelidis, Amit Ganapati Baadkar, Greg Gladstone, Kylie Wijsmuller, Matthew Kiyoshi Wong – Toy Story 4 – Pixar Animation Studios; Hidetsugu Ito, Yuko Nakajima, Jumi Lee, Ryosuke Tsuda – Weathering with You – Toho / CoMix Wave Films
Outstanding Achievement for Character Animation in an Animated Television / Broadcast Production	Outstanding Achievement for Character Animation in an Animated Feature Production
Aulo Licinio – His Dark Materials – BBC Studios; Chris O'Hara – Ask the StoryBots – JibJab Bros. Studios for Netflix; Juliane Martin – Rapunzel's Tangled Adventure – Disney Television Animation / Disney Channel; Andrew Muir – How to Train Your Dragon Homecoming – DreamWorks Animation; Scott DaRos – Robot Chicken – Stoopid Buddy Stoodios	Sergio Martins – Klaus — Netflix; Andrew Ford – Frozen 2 – Walt Disney Animation Studios; Dane Stogner – How to Train Your Dragon: The Hidden World – DreamWorks Animation; Rani Naamani – How to Train Your Dragon: The Hidden World – DreamWorks Animation; Rachelle Lambden – Missing Link – Laika
Outstanding Achievement for Character Animation in a Live Action Production	Outstanding Achievement for Character Animation in a Video Game
Sidney Kombo-Kintombo – Avengers: Endgame – Marvel Studios; Michael Cozens – Alita: Battle Angel – 20th Century Fox; Jason Snyman, Sheik Ghafoor, Maia Neubig, Michael Siegel, Cheri Fojtik – Game of Thrones - "The Long Night" - Dance of the Dragons – HBO; Dale Newton, Waiyin Mendoza, Rochelle Flynn, Leila Gaed, Paul Jones – Pokémon Detective Pikachu — Legendary Pictures / The Pokémon Company; Steven Argula – Spider-Man: Far From Home – Marvel Studios	Sebastien Parodi, Nicolas Leger – Unruly Heroes — Unity; Brian Whitmire – Gears 5 - Cinematic Animation – Unreal Engine 4; Munenori Shinagawa, Kayoko Yajima, Koji Hamada, Koji Inoue – Kingdom Hearts III – Square Enix; Tommy Rodricks, Natan Moura, Nelson Boles – Sinclair Snake: Museum Mischief – Chromosphere / Within
Outstanding Achievement for Character Design in an Animated Television / Broadcast Production	Outstanding Achievement for Character Design in an Animated Feature Production
Keiko Murayama – Carmen Sandiego – Houghton Mifflin Harcourt Publishing and WildBrain for Netflix; Lauren Faust – DC Super Hero Girls – Warner Bros. Animation; John Jagusak – T.O.T.S. – Titmouse, Inc. / Disney Junior; Chris Mitchell – The Adventures of Rocky and Bullwinkle – DreamWorks Animation; Fabien Mense – Victor and Valentino – Cartoon Network Studios	Torsten Schrank – Klaus — Netflix; Nico Marlet – Abominable – DreamWorks Animation; Bill Schwab – Frozen 2 – Walt Disney Animation Studios; José Manuel Fernández Oli – Spies in Disguise — Blue Sky Studios; Craig Kellman – The Addams Family – Metro-Goldwyn-Mayer Pictures
Outstanding Achievement for Directing in an Animated Television / Broadcast Production	Outstanding Achievement for Directing in an Animated Feature Production
Alonso Ramirez Ramos – Mickey Mouse – Disney Television Animation / Disney Channel; Jeff Gill – Ask the StoryBots – JibJab Bros. Studios for Netflix; Natalie Wetzig – DC Super Hero Girls — Warner Bros. Animation; Masahito Kobayashi – Rilakkuma and Kaoru — Dwarf for Netflix; Kenji Kamiyama, Shinji Aramaki – Ultraman – Production I.G, SOLA Digital Arts for Netflix	Sergio Pablos – Klaus — Netflix; Jennifer Lee, Chris Buck – Frozen 2 – Walt Disney Animation Studios; Jérémy Clapin – I Lost My Body – Xilam for Netflix; Chris Butler – Missing Link – Laika; Makoto Shinkai – Weathering with You – Toho / CoMix Wave Films
Outstanding Achievement for Music in an Animated Television / Broadcast Production	Outstanding Achievement for Music in an Animated Feature Production
Rob Cairns – Love, Death & Robots – Blur Studio / Netflix Studios; Jared Lee Gosselin, Steve D'Angelo, Lorenzo Castelli – Carmen Sandiego – Houghton Mifflin Harcourt Publishing and WildBrain for Netflix; Carl Thiel – Seis Manos – VIZ Media / Powerhouse Animation Studios; Sunna Wehrmeijer – She-Ra and the Princesses of Power – DreamWorks Animation; Vivek Maddala – The Tom and Jerry Show – Warner Bros. Animation	Dan Levy – I Lost My Body – Xilam for Netflix; Gints Zilbalodis – AWAY – Dream Well Studios; Christophe Beck, Frode Fjellheim, Kristen Anderson-Lopez, Robert Lopez – Frozen 2 – Walt Disney Animation Studios; Mark Ronson, Theodore Shapiro – Spies in Disguise – Blue Sky Studios; Randy Newman – Toy Story 4 – Pixar Animation Studios
Outstanding Achievement for Production Design in an Animated Television / Broadcast Production	Outstanding Achievement for Production Design in an Animated Feature Production
Alberto Mielgo – Love, Death & Robots – Blur Studio / Netflix Studios; Eastwood Wong, Sylvia Liu, Elaine Lee, Linda Fong, Emily Paik – Carmen Sandiego – Houghton Mifflin Harcourt Publishing and WildBrain for Netflix; Alan Bodner, Brian Woods, Steven Nickodemus, Laura Price, Leonard Robledo – Rapunzel's Tangled Adventure – Disney Television Animation / Disney Channel; Khang Le, Chris Fisher, Gael Bertrand, Deodato Pangandoyon, Howard Chen – Mao Mao: Heroes of Pure Heart – Cartoon Network Studios / Titmouse, Inc.; Chris Mitchell, Chris Turnham, Tor Aunet, DanBob Thompson, Aaron Spurgeon – The Adventures of Rocky and Bullwinkle – DreamWorks Animation	Szymon Biernacki, Marcin Jakubowski – Klaus — Netflix; Max Boas, Paul Duncan, Christopher Brock, Cecline Da Hyeu Kim, Jane Li – Abominable – DreamWorks Animation; Pierre-Olivier Vincent, Kirsten Kawamura, Woonyoung Jung, Iuri Lioi, Philippe Brochu – How to Train Your Dragon: The Hidden World – DreamWorks Animation; Nelson Lowry, Santiago Montiel, Trevor Dalmer – Missing Link – Laika; Patricia Atchison, Maisha Moore, Chris Souza, Jack Yu – The Addams Family – Metro-Goldwyn-Mayer Pictures
Outstanding Achievement for Storyboarding in an Animated Television / Broadcast Production	Outstanding Achievement for Storyboarding in an Animated Feature Production
Kenny Park – Carmen Sandiego – Houghton Mifflin Harcourt Publishing and WildBrain for Netflix; Shinichiro Watanabe – Carole & Tuesday – Bones for Netflix; Owen Sullivan – Love, Death & Robots – Blur Studio / Netflix Studios; Riccardo Durante – Snoopy in Space – Apple Inc.; Max Lang – Zog – Magic Light Pictures	Sergio Pablos – Klaus — Netflix; Julien Bisaro – I Lost My Body – Xilam for Netflix; Jérémy Clapin – I Lost My Body – Xilam for Netflix; Julián Nariño – Missing Link – Laika; Oliver Thomas – Missing Link – Laika
Outstanding Achievement for Voice Acting in an Animated Television / Broadcast Production	Outstanding Achievement for Voice Acting in an Animated Feature Production
H. Jon Benjamin – Bob's Burgers — 20th Century Fox / Bento Box Entertainment; Marieve Herington – Big City Greens – Disney Television Animation / Disney Channel; Sarah Stiles – Steven Universe – Cartoon Network Studios; Debi Derryberry – Tigtone — Titmouse, Inc. / Babyhemyth Productions / Williams Street; Ali Wong – Tuca & Bertie – Tornante Productions, LLC for Netflix	Josh Gad – Frozen 2 – Walt Disney Animation Studios; Tenzing Norgay Trainor – Abominable – DreamWorks Animation; Richard Horvitz – Invader Zim: Enter the Florpus – CJ Entertainment and Nickelodeon Animation Studio for Netflix; Jenny Slate – The Secret Life of Pets 2 — Illumination; Tony Hale – Toy Story 4 – Pixar Animation Studios
Outstanding Achievement for Writing in an Animated Television / Broadcast Production	Outstanding Achievement for Writing in an Animated Feature Production
Shauna McGarry – Tuca & Bertie – Tornante Productions, LLC for Netflix; George Gendi, Michael Gendi, Deepak Sethi, Eric Acosta, Sean Szeles – Apple & Onion – Cartoon Network Studios; Alison Tafel – BoJack Horseman – Tornante Productions, LLC for Netflix; Sheela Shrinivas, Aminder Dhaliwal, Rikke Asbjoern – Pinky Malinky – Nickelodeon Animation Studios Netflix; Meghan Read – Xavier Riddle and the Secret Museum – Brown Bag Films / 9 Story Media Group	Jérémy Clapin, Guillaume Laurant – I Lost My Body – Xilam for Netflix; Jennifer Lee – Frozen 2 – Walt Disney Animation Studios; Dean DeBlois – How to Train Your Dragon: The Hidden World – DreamWorks Animation; Andrew Stanton, Stephany Folsom – Toy Story 4 – Pixar Animation Studios; Makoto Shinkai – Weathering with You – Toho / CoMix Wave Films
Outstanding Achievement for Editorial in an Animated Television / Broadcast Production	Outstanding Achievement for Editorial in an Animated Feature Production
Bo Juhl, Stacy Auckland, Valerian Zamel – Love, Death & Robots – Blur Studio for Netflix Studios; Dao Le, Joe Molinari, Charles T. Jones, David Vasquez – Big Hero 6: The Series – Disney Television Animation / Disney Channel; Torien Blackwolf – DC Super Hero Girls — Warner Bros. Animation; Tony Molina – Mickey Mouse – Disney Television Animation / Disney Channel; Margaret Hou – Green Eggs and Ham — Warner Bros. Animation for Netflix	Pablo García Revert – Klaus — Netflix; John K. Carr, Mark Hester, Mary Blee – How to Train Your Dragon: The Hidden World – DreamWorks Animation; Stephen Perkins – Missing Link – Laika; Tiffany Hillkurtz – The Secret Life of Pets 2 — Illumination; Axel Geddes, Torbin Xan Bullock, Greg Snyder – Toy Story 4 – Pixar Animation Studios

== Multiple awards and nominations ==
=== Films ===
The following films received multiple nominations:

Nominations	Film
8	Frozen 2
8	Missing Link
7	Klaus
6	How to Train Your Dragon: The Hidden World
6	I Lost My Body
6	Toy Story 4
4	Weathering With You
4	Abominable
2	Spies in Disguise
2	The Secret Life of Pets 2
2	The Addams Family

The following films received multiple awards:

Wins	Film
7	Klaus
3	I Lost My Body
2	Frozen 2

=== Television/Broadcast ===
The following shows received multiple nominations:

Nominations	Show
4	Carmen Sandiego
4	Love, Death & Robots
4	Mickey Mouse
3	Ask the StoryBots
3	DC Super Hero Girls
3	How to Train Your Dragon Homecoming
3	Tuca & Bertie
2	3Below: Tales of Arcadia
2	BoJack Horseman
2	Rapunzel's Tangled Adventure
2	Steven Universe
2	The Adventures of Rocky and Bullwinkle
2	The Tom and Jerry Show
2	Xavier Riddle and the Secret Museum
2	Zog

The following shows received multiple awards:

Wins	Show
4	Love, Death & Robots
2	Carmen Sandiego
2	Mickey Mouse
