= Screen Novelties =

American animation studio

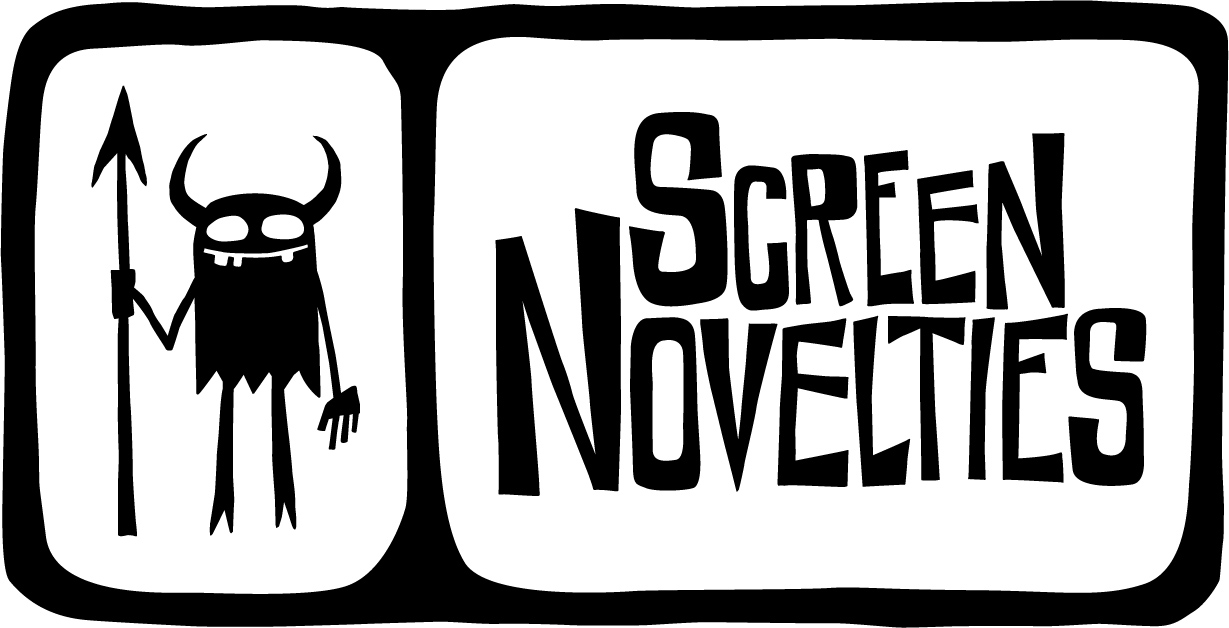
- Type: Private
- Founded: 2000; 26 years ago
- Headquarters: Los Angeles, California, United States
- Key people: Mark Caballero; Seamus Walsh; Chris Finnegan
- Website: www.screen-novelties.com

Screen Novelties (stylized as SCREEN NOVELTIES) is an American animation studio, specializing in stop motion animation. It was founded by Mark Caballero, Seamus Walsh, and Chris Finnegan.

== Overview ==
Their work fuses classic cartoon sensibilities with mixed-media elements such as puppetry and miniature model photography. They were among the first stop motion artists to adopt an entirely digital capture system and workflow, beginning in 1999 with the pilot films that would eventually become Robot Chicken. Screen Novelties was integral in the launch of both Robot Chicken and Moral Orel for Cartoon Network's Adult Swim programming block. They also animated the stop motion SpongeBob SquarePants episodes, It's a Spongebob Christmas!, The Legend of Boo-Kini Bottom, and Sandy's Country Christmas.

Notable past work includes:

- Creating a stop motion animation version of the Flintstones for a dream sequence in The Flintstones: On the Rocks.
- Working with Ray Harryhausen, helping him complete his film The Story of The Tortoise & the Hare.
- Contributing whimsical puppet and special effects sequences for Cartoon Network shows Chowder and The Marvelous Misadventures of Flapjack.
- Performing the restoration of the original Rudolph & Santa Puppets from the 1964 classic Rudolph the Red-Nosed Reindeer

Their offbeat short films enjoy a small cult following, especially "Mysterious Mose" which was made in their garage in 1997–98, using a hand-wound Bolex camera and an old 78rpm record as the soundtrack. The film mixes rod puppetry, stop motion animation, and silhouette animation. They have mentored other filmmakers, including Arturo and Roy Ambriz.

== Filmography ==
- Old Man & the Goblins
- The Boy with the Flip-top Head
- Graveyard Jamboree with Mysterious Mose
- The Story of The Tortoise & the Hare
- Monster Safari
- Zombie Brothers
- Monster High: Gaga for Ghouls

=== Television and film credits ===
Title	Year(s)	Notes	Client
The Flintstones: On the Rocks	2001	stop-motion sequence	Cartoon Network Studios
Courage the Cowardly Dog	2002	"Perfect" (stop-motion sequence)	Stretch Films
Drew Carey's Green Screen Show	2004	stop-motion animation	Warner Bros. Television
The SpongeBob SquarePants Movie	2004	stop-motion sequence	Nickelodeon Movies
Robot Chicken	2005-2012	first 5 seasons	Stoopid Monkey; ShadowMachine
Moral Orel	2005-2007	seasons 1 and 2	ShadowMachine
Billy and Mandy's Big Boogey Adventure	2007	puppets	Cartoon Network Studios
Robot Chicken: Star Wars	2007		Stoopid Monkey; ShadowMachine
Chowder	2007-2010	stop-motion/puppet sequences	Cartoon Network Studios
The Marvelous Misadventures of Flapjack	2008-2010	stop-motion sequences	Cartoon Network Studios
The Electric Company	2009	Jack Bowser sequences	Sesame Workshop
Family Guy	2006; 2009; 2011	"Deep Throats" (stop-motion segment) "Road to the Multiverse" (Robot Chicken segment) "Foreign Affairs" (puppet sequence)	20th Century Fox Television
SpongeBob SquarePants	2009–present	stop-motion animation	Nickelodeon Animation Studio
Mad	2010-2011	additional animation	Warner Bros. Animation
85th Academy Awards	2013	Sock puppet sequence	Academy of Motion Picture Arts and Sciences
Adventure Time	2013	LEGO title sequence	Cartoon Network Studios
Cloudy with a Chance of Meatballs 2	2013	end credits	Sony Pictures Animation
Elf: Buddy's Musical Christmas	2014		Warner Bros. Animation
The SpongeBob Movie: Sponge Out of Water	2015	Bubbles character only	Nickelodeon Movies
Harvey Beaks	2015; 2016	"Yampions" (stop-motion animation) "It's Christmas You Dorks!" (stop-motion sequences)	Nickelodeon Animation Studio
Captain Underpants: The First Epic Movie	2017	Sock puppet sequence	DreamWorks Animation
Invader Zim: Enter the Florpus	2019	Puppet sequence	Nickelodeon Animation Studio
The SpongeBob Movie: Sponge on the Run	2020	stop-motion animation	Nickelodeon Movies and MRC
The Patrick Star Show	2021–present	stop-motion animation	Nickelodeon Animation Studio
Kamp Koral: SpongeBob's Under Years	2021	"What About Meep?" (puppet sequence)	Nickelodeon Animation Studio
Animaniacs	2021	"Mouse Madness" (stop-motion sequence)	Warner Bros. Animation and Amblin Television
The Cuphead Show!	2022	stop-motion backgrounds	Netflix Animation and Studio MDHR
Jim Henson Idea Man	2024	stop-motion animation	Disney+ and Imagine Documentaries
Smurfs	2025	clay animation	Paramount Animation, Paramount Pictures and Peyo

=== Video game credits ===
Title	Year(s)	Notes	Client
Fortnite	2018	Stop-motion cutscene animation	Epic Games
Cuphead: The Delicious Last Course	2022	Puppet Trailer	Studio MDHR

=== Commercials ===
- Nike
- Hallmark Cards
- Mississippi State Department of Health
- Rotofugi
- CareerBuilder
- All
- Corn Pops
- McDonald's
- Ray-Ban
- Jim Henson's Creature Shop Challenge
- Google
- Honda
- Target Corporation
- GMC
- Hewlett-Packard
- Allstate

== Awards and nominations ==
Won 30th Annual Annie Award in the category Best Short Film for The Story of the Tortoise & The Hare.

Nominated for the 34th Annual Annie Award in the category Best Animated Television Commercial.
