= Klaus (film) =

2019 Spanish animated Christmas comedy film

- Release poster
- Directed by: Sergio Pablos
- Screenplay by: Sergio Pablos; Jim Mahoney; Zach Lewis
- Story by: Sergio Pablos
- Produced by: Jinko Gotoh; Sergio Pablos; Marisa Roman; Matt Teevan; Mercedes Gamero; Mikel Lejarza; Gustavo Ferrada
- Starring: Jason Schwartzman; J. K. Simmons; Rashida Jones; Will Sasso; Neda Margrethe Labba; Sergio Pablos; Norm Macdonald; Joan Cusack
- Edited by: Pablo Garcia Revert
- Music by: Alfonso G. Aguilar
- Production companies: Netflix Animation Studios; Comic Animations; The SPA Studios; Atresmedia Cine; Yowza! Animation
- Distributed by: Netflix
- Release date: 8 November 2019
- Running time: 97 minutes
- Countries: Spain; United States; United Kingdom; Canada
- Languages: English; Northern Sami
- Budget: $40 million

Klaus is a 2019 animated Christmas comedy film co-written, co-produced, and directed by Sergio Pablos in his directorial debut, produced by his company the SPA Studios and distributed by Netflix. A traditionally animated film, it stars the voices of Jason Schwartzman, J. K. Simmons, Rashida Jones, Will Sasso, Neda Margrethe Labba, Pablos (in a dual role), Norm Macdonald (in his final film role released in his lifetime), and Joan Cusack. Serving as an origin story of Santa Claus and using a fictionalized 19th-century setting, the plot revolves around a postman stationed in an island town to the Far North who befriends a reclusive toymaker (Klaus).

Klaus was released on 8 November 2019 and received critical acclaim for its animation, story, emotional depth, humor, narrative, and vocal performances. It won seven awards at the 47th Annie Awards, including Best Animated Feature, and also won Best Animated Film at the 73rd British Academy Film Awards. The film was also nominated at the 92nd Academy Awards for Best Animated Feature, making it the first animated film from Netflix to be nominated for an Academy Award, as well as the first animated film released by a streaming service to be nominated, alongside I Lost My Body (also Netflix), but lost to Toy Story 4, which also starred Cusack.

== Plot ==
In 19th-century Norway, the Royal Postmaster General has enrolled his lazy and spoiled son Jesper Johansen into the Royal Postal Academy. Jesper deliberately underperforms, intent on returning to his privileged lifestyle. His father gives him an ultimatum: he is to be the postman of the distant, northern island town of Smeerensburg, where he must establish a post office and post 6,000 letters within a year. If Jesper fails, he will be cut off from the family's fortune.

Jesper finds Smeerensburg comprised almost entirely of two feuding familial clans: the Ellingboes and the Krums. After a week of seeking letters from the townsfolk to no avail, Jesper finds an isolated house far outside of town filled with handmade toys, as well as its owner, elderly reclusive woodsman Klaus. Terrified by Klaus' imposing appearance, Jesper flees, leaving behind a drawing from one of Smeerensburg's Krum children. Klaus forces Jesper to enter the boy's home to secretly deliver a toy, which delights the child.

Word of the toy delivery spreads to the other children, who visit Jesper believing they'll receive a toy if they send Klaus a letter. Jesper capitalizes on the idea to progress his goal and asks Klaus if he can donate his toys. Klaus reluctantly agrees, provided they operate at night and Jesper continues delivering the toys in secret. The Krum boy's toy leads him to befriend an Ellingboe girl, much to their clans' outrage. As more children write letters to Klaus, Jesper tells a boy who had earlier ridiculed him that Klaus knows whenever any child misbehaves and only gives toys to good ones. This prompts the children to perform acts of kindness, which gradually inspires the rest of the townsfolk to end their dispute. The children ask bitter teacher-turned-fishmonger Alva to teach them to read and write so they can send letters; her faith restored, she uses her escape savings to reopen her school.

With Klaus's toy supply running out, Jesper tries persuading him to make more in time for Christmas, but Klaus refuses. When Jesper happens upon a keepsake of Klaus's late wife Lydia, Klaus forces him away. Motivated by Márgu, a Sámi girl who can't write or speak in Norwegian, Jesper works with Alva to help Márgu write a letter asking for a sled, which he then attempts to build alone. Seeing Jesper's effort, Klaus reconciles with him and the two finish the sled. Upon delivering it and seeing Márgu's joy, Jesper is genuinely moved. Klaus reveals he had made the toys for the children he and Lydia hoped to have but could not conceive. He agrees to the Christmas plan, and Márgu arrives with the rest of her people to help. As the town and Jesper's relationship with Alva flourish, Jesper finds himself conflicted about whether to leave Smeerensburg.

Meanwhile, family elders Aksel Ellingboe and Tammy Krum form a temporary truce to stop Jesper and Klaus so the clans can resume their feud. Together, they discover Jesper's initial motive and forge enough letters to meet well over his target. Jesper's father arrives on Christmas Eve to congratulate his son, inadvertently revealing Jesper's scheme to his friends, who shun him. Just before they leave town, Jesper's father notices his son's remorse; after a private talk, he allows Jesper to stay, telling him he is proud of his son. Jesper tries to stop the elders and their angry mob from destroying the Christmas toys, resulting in a chase during which Aksel's daughter Magdalone and Tammy's son Olaf fall in love. Jesper endangers himself to save the toys, which Tammy seemingly destroys; however, Alva and Klaus had already replaced the toys with decoys after the town's children warned them of the mob's ambush. Still, Jesper's actions have redeemed him to Klaus and Alva, and they then deliver the presents.

Magdalone and Olaf marry, ending their families' feud. Jesper marries Alva and they raise two children. Jesper and Klaus continue to deliver presents in Smeerensburg and beyond for eleven years. On the twelfth year, Klaus mysteriously disappears. Every subsequent Christmas Eve, Jesper waits to see Klaus, who returns every year to deliver toys across the world.

== Voice cast ==
- Jason Schwartzman as Jesper Johansen, a young postman who befriends Klaus and helps bring much-needed happiness to Smeerensburg while getting accustomed to a life outside of his comfort zone.
- J. K. Simmons as Klaus (Santa Claus), an initially-reclusive large woodworker who makes toys.
  - Simmons also voices the Drill Sarge (uncredited), the assistant head of the Johansen family's postal department who works under the Royal Postmaster General.
- Rashida Jones as Alva, a teacher turned fishmonger who becomes Jesper's love interest.
- Will Sasso as Mr. Aksel Ellingboe, the dimwitted Ellingboe Clan patriarch carrying on an ancient feud of his clan with the Krums.
- Neda Margrethe Labba as Márgu, a young Sámi girl who befriends Jesper, despite their language barrier.
- Sergio Pablos as:
  - Olaf Krum, Mrs. Krum's hulking son who does not speak, but communicates with various nonverbal sounds.
  - Magdelone "Pumpkin" Ellingboe, Mr. Ellingboe's hulking daughter who only speaks the word "mine".
- Norm Macdonald as Mogens, the sarcastic ferryman of Smeerensburg who enjoys humor that comes at others' expense.
- Joan Cusack as Mrs. Tammy Krum, the cunning Krum Clan matriarch carrying on an ancient feud of her clan with the Ellingboes.
- Reiulf Aleksandersen and Sara Margrethe Oksal as adult Sami voices, including Márgu's parents.
- Sam McMurray as The Postmaster General (uncredited), Jesper's strict father and headmaster of The Royal Postal Academy, who sends his son to Smeerensburg to teach him discipline and responsibility.

Additional children voices provided by Evan Agos, Sky Alexis, Jaeden Bettencourt, Teddy Blum, Mila Brener, Sydney Brower, Finn Carr, Kendall Joy Hall (who voiced Annelise Ellingboe), Hayley Hermida, Lexie Holland, Brooke Huckeba, Matthew McCann, Tucker Meek, Leo Miller, Joaquin Obradors, Víctor Pablos, Lucian Perez, Bailey Rae Fenderson, Maximus Riegel, Emma Shannon, Ayden Soria, Sunday Sturz, Hudson West, Gordon Wilcox, Emma Yarovinskiy, and Julian Zane.

Additional adult voices provided by Brad Abrell, Catherine Cavadini, Bill Chott, Daniel Crook, Brian Finney, Stephen Hughes, Neil Kaplan, Sam McMurray, Amanda Philipson, Alyson Reed, Dee Dee Rescher, Dwight Schultz, Lloyd Sherr, Helen Slayton-Hughes, and Travis Willingham.

== Production ==
After setting up his animation studio in Madrid, Spain, director Sergio Pablos, who had worked on Disney Renaissance films such as The Hunchback of Notre Dame, Hercules, and Tarzan, decided to develop a new traditionally-animated feature film. Pablos wanted to explore how the medium would have evolved had western animation film studios not switched to producing mostly computer animated films since the 1990s. For the film's look, the studio sought to overcome some of the technical limitations that traditional animation had, focusing on organic and volumetric lighting and texturing to give the film a unique look, while maintaining a hand-crafted feel. Proprietary tools from Les films du Poisson Rouge, a French company in Angoulême, were used to allow the team to produce a variety of visual development styles, with the aim of getting away from the standardized style of "characters looking like stickers put on painted backgrounds." Fellow Disney animators James Baxter, known for Beauty and the Beast, and Andrew Chesworth also worked on the film.

The first teaser for the project was released in April 2012; at the time, the studio was seeking investment, co-production, and distribution partners. It was shopped around to various studios, but most studios — including Netflix at first — rejected the movie viewing it as "too risky." In November 2017, Netflix announced that they had acquired the global rights to Klaus; at the same time, the casting of Schwartzman, Jones, Simmons, and Cusack was announced along with a Christmas 2019 release date. In March 2019, it was reported that Netflix was planning an Oscar-qualifying run for Klaus in theaters, and it was listed as one of ten films Netflix was negotiating with chains to give limited releases prior to their online debuts that August.

The film is dedicated to animator and scene checker Mary Lescher who died on 2 June 2019 of cancer. She had worked on Klaus, as well at both Disney Animation and DisneyToon Studios from 1989 to 2006. Pablos said Smeerensburg is a deliberate misspelling of Smeerenburg, a former Dutch and Norwegian whaling station in the Arctic archipelago of Svalbard.

=== Story development ===
Pablos said the story was indirectly inspired by the Christopher Nolan film Batman Begins. "What a great storytelling exercise, to take a character that's already well established … and bring it to today's audience". Pablos workshopped origin story retellings for several characters, including real-life figures like Napoleon Bonaparte and magical figures including Dracula before settling on Santa Claus. "He has many origin stories, but in the end I thought that there was not one canon-accepted origin story," according to Pablos, whose travels to Norway inspired much of the direction of the film, including the inclusion of the Sami people. It was this decision that led to Netflix green-lighting the project, as the streaming giant had not been interested in original feature-length animation but made an exception due to an interest in releasing new Christmas stories.

== Release ==
Klaus was released theatrically in select theaters on 8 November 2019, and was released digitally through Netflix on 15 November. It is the first original animated feature film to appear on Netflix. In January 2020, Netflix reported the film was watched by 40 million members over its first four weeks of release.

== Reception ==
=== Critical response ===
On review aggregation website Rotten Tomatoes, the film has an approval rating of 95% based on 78 reviews with an average rating of 7.7/10. The critical consensus reads "Beautiful hand-drawn animation and a humorous, heartwarming narrative make Klaus an instant candidate for holiday classic status." On Metacritic the film has a weighted average score of 65 out of 100, based on 13 critics, indicating "generally favorable" reviews.

John DeFore of The Hollywood Reporter gave the film a positive review, writing: "Sergio Pablos' Klaus invents its own unexpected and very enjoyable origin story for the big guy who gives out toys every Christmas eve. Shaking off most Yuletide cliches in favor of a from-scratch story about how even dubiously-motivated generosity can lead to joy, it contains echoes of other seasonal favorites (especially, in a topsy-turvy way, Dr. Seuss' Grinch) while standing completely on its own." Peter Debruge of Variety gave the film a mixed review, calling the film over-complicated and saying: "What goodwill the movie does inspire owes more to the splendid visual world than to anything the story supplies."

According to data provided by Netflix to Reuters, the film racked up nearly 30 million views worldwide in its first month. The film beat Toy Story 4 for Best Animated Film of 2019 on Animation Magazine.

Deseret News named Klaus on their list of underrated Christmas movies to watch in 2023.

=== Accolades ===
Accolades received by Klaus (film)
Award	Date of ceremony	Category	Recipient(s)	Result	Ref.
Academy Awards	9 February 2020	Best Animated Feature	Sergio Pablos, Jinko Gotoh and Marisa Román	Nominated	
British Academy Film Awards	2 February 2020	Best Animated Film	Sergio Pablos and Jinko Gotoh	Won	
Alliance of Women Film Journalists	10 January 2020	Best Animated Feature	Klaus	Nominated	
Annie Awards	25 January 2020	Best Animated Feature	Jinko Gotoh, Sergio Pablos, Marisa Román, Matthew Teevan, Mercedes Gamero, Mikel Lejarza Ortiz and Gustavo Ferrada	Won	
Annie Awards	25 January 2020	Best Character Animation in a Feature Film	Sergio Martins (animation supervisor) for "Alva"	Won	
Annie Awards	25 January 2020	Best Character Design in a Feature Film	Torsten Schrank	Won	
Annie Awards	25 January 2020	Best Directing in a Feature Film	Sergio Pablos	Won	
Annie Awards	25 January 2020	Best Production Design in a Feature Film	Szymon Biernacki, Marcin Jakubowski	Won	
Annie Awards	25 January 2020	Best Storyboarding in a Feature Film	Sergio Pablos	Won	
Annie Awards	25 January 2020	Best Editorial in a Feature Film	Pablo García Revert	Won	
Austin Film Critics Association Awards	6 January 2020	Best Animated Feature	Klaus	Nominated	
Detroit Film Critics Society Awards	9 December 2019	Best Animated Feature	Klaus	Nominated	
Golden Trailer Awards	22 July 2021	Best Animation/Family Movie Poster	Klaus (Concept Arts)	Nominated	
Goya Awards	25 January 2020	Best Animated Feature	Klaus	Nominated	
Goya Awards	25 January 2020	Best Original Song	"Invisible" Jussi Ilmari Karvinen, Caroline Pennell, Justin Tranter (songwriters)	Nominated	
St. Louis Film Critics Association Awards	15 December 2019	Best Animated Feature	Klaus	Runner-up (tied w/ Frozen II)	
Visual Effects Society	29 January 2020	Outstanding Visual Effects in an Animated Feature	Sergio Pablos, Matthew Teevan, Marcin Jakubowski and Szymon Biernacki	Nominated	
Visual Effects Society	29 January 2020	Outstanding Animated Character in an Animated Feature	Yoshimishi Tamura, Alfredo Cassano, Maxime Delalande and Jason Schwartzman for "Jesper"	Nominated	
Washington D.C. Film Critics Association Awards	8 December 2019	Best Animated Feature	Klaus	Nominated	
European Film Awards	12 December 2020	Best Feature Film	Klaus	Nominated	
Quirino Awards	27 June 2020	Best Ibero-American Animation Feature Film	Klaus	Won	
Quirino Awards	27 June 2020	Best Animation Design	Sergio Pablos, Sergio Martins, Charlie Bonifacio, Victor Ens, Yoshi Tamura	Won	
Quirino Awards	27 June 2020	Best Sound Design and Original Music	Gabriel Gutiérrez, Alfonso González Aguilar	Nominated	
British Academy Children's Awards	27 November 2022	Best Feature Film	Sergio Pablos	Nominated	

== Soundtrack ==
"Invisible" by Zara Larsson and "How You Like Me Now?" by The Heavy are featured in the film. The song "High Hopes" by Panic! at the Disco is featured in the trailer.

== See also ==
- Red One, a 2024 film in which J. K. Simmons also plays Santa Claus
- List of Christmas films
- Santa Claus in film
