= Aaron Blaise =

American painter, animator, director (born 1968)

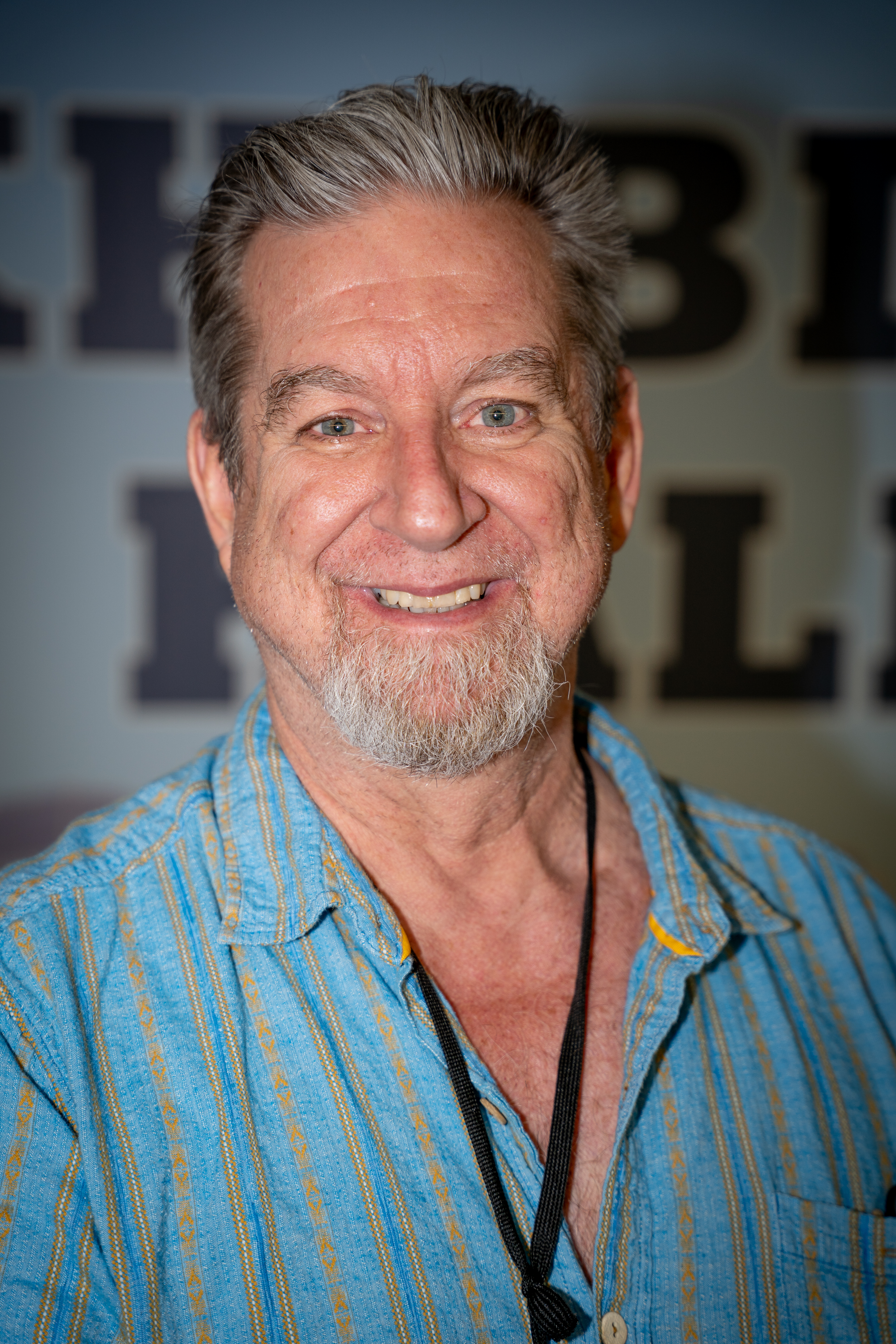
- Blaise in 2026
- Born: February 17, 1968 (age 58); Burlington, Vermont, U.S.
- Education: Ringling College of Art and Design
- Known for: Painting; animating; illustrating; art education
- Notable work: Brother Bear (2003)
- Website: creatureartteacher.com

Aaron Blaise (born February 17, 1968) is an American painter, animator, film director, and art instructor. He is known for his work on Beauty and the Beast (1991), Aladdin (1992), The Lion King (1994), and Brother Bear (2003). He was nominated for the Academy Award for Best Animated Feature Film for Brother Bear with Robert Walker, a Canadian animator from Ontario.

== Background ==
Aaron Blaise was born on February 17 1968, in Burlington, Vermont. He grew up living in a small trailer in Florida near Corkscrew Swamp. When he was 17, his home was lost in a fire. He had plans to work in forestry, however his stepfather advised him to have an art career.

He graduated from Ringling College of Art and Design in Sarasota, Florida, as an illustrator in 1989. In the same year, he began working as an animator and supervising animator at Walt Disney Animation Studios for eight years on The Rescuers Down Under, Beauty and the Beast, Aladdin, The Lion King, Pocahontas, and Mulan. When he was 20, Blaise had begun working for Disney as an intern. His mentor, Glen Keane, was an encouragement to him. In the beginning, Blaise found it difficult to portray movement. Techniques like slowins were not coming easily to him until suddenly it clicked and he found his ability. Starting in 1997, he worked as a director for 12 years. During that time he co-directed Brother Bear, which was nominated for Best Animated Feature at the 76th Academy Awards.

The Disney studios in Florida, where 365 people worked, were shuttered. Blaise and nine other people were the only ones who stayed employed. They moved to the company's Burbank animation studios, where Blaise developed several projects. After his wife, Karen, died on March 11, 2007, he left Disney. In 2013, he worked at Paramount Pictures for less than a year as a visual development artist. From 2010 to 2014 he worked at Tradition Studios (Digital Domain) as a director on The Legend of Tembo but the company went bankrupt. In 2012, with his business partner, Nick Burch, he started CreatureArtTeacher, offering lessons and tutorials based on Blaise's long career.

== Filmography ==
=== Animation department ===
Year	Title	Credits	Characters
1990	Roller Coaster Rabbit (Short)	Assistant Animator	—N/a
1990	The Rescuers Down Under	Assistant Animator	Wilbur
1991	Beauty and the Beast	Animator	Beast
1992	Aladdin	Supervising Animator	Rajah
1993	Trail Mix-Up (Short)	Character Animator	—N/a
1994	The Lion King	Supervising Animator	Young Nala
1994	The Lion King (Video game)	Supervising Animator	Young Nala
1995	Pocahontas	Animator	Pocahontas
1998	Mulan	Supervising Animator	Yao and The Ancestors
2013	John Lewis: The Bear & the Hare (Video short)	Supervising Animator, Character Designer	—N/a
2016	The Dream Catcher (Short)	Creature Design	—N/a
2020	Spread the Love (Short)	Animator	Bear Hugs

=== Director ===
Year	Title
1999	How to Haunt a House (Short)
2003	Brother Bear
2025	Snow Bear (Short)

=== Art department ===
Year	Title	Credits
2017	Mum (Short)	Illustration / Painter
2020	Wolfwalkers	Concept Artist / Visual Development
