= SpinnWebe =

SpinnWebe

SpinnWebe was the personal website of Greg Galcik, also known as "spinn". It gathered the most fame as the home of the Dysfunctional Family Circus, which ran in the late 1990s. The site also included a number of Galcik's other projects, which generally had interactive humor as the unifying theme; in this respect, it anticipated the development of later sites such as Fark and Something Awful. Spinnwebe is a German word for "spider web".

== Origin ==
In March 1993, Galcik started an FTP site on a machine called "spider," named after the song Spider by They Might Be Giants. This site began as a way to serve files for various personal projects, including audio samples from TMBG songs. As the site continued to grow and as Web technology began to emerge, he began to phase out the FTP site in June 1994 and created "The Spider WWW Site."

Galcik later shortened the name to "SpiderWeb", but after receiving a letter from a company called Spiderweb Communications warning they carried a trademark on the name "Spiderweb", he changed the name of the site to "SpinnWebe" in April 1995. Galcik also derived his Internet alias, "spinn", from this word.

== Dysfunctional Family Circus ==
In 1995, Galcik started the SpinnWebe version of Dysfunctional Family Circus (DFC), an interactive parody of the comic strip The Family Circus where visitors were invited to submit alternative captions for the widely syndicated Bil Keane comic strip. Galcik and a group of editors hand-picked the best captions for publication on the site. This curated approach is unusual, especially for a website with as much traffic as the DFC: the pool of submissions often exceeded a thousand captions per comic, and were generally edited down to around sixty. Fans of the DFC claim that this editing process helped maintain a higher standard of humor that other Family Circus parodies could not reach.

Bil Keane has stated that he was initially unbothered by the parody, but he began to become uncomfortable with it due to the prevalence of blue humor in the published captions, and because readers were complaining to him. In September 1999, King Features Syndicate, the distributor of Family Circus, sent a cease-and-desist letter to Galcik. While the case could certainly have been contested on the basis of fair use, Galcik elected to honor the request out of courtesy toward Keane.

== Other highlights ==
SpinnWebe was home to many different features, some of which had their own domain names. Projects included:

- A-1 AAA AmeriCaptions and its earlier incarnation It's a Dysfunctional Life, a feature similar to the DFC where visitors write captions for candid photos
- Trapezoidal Inclination, or Brainshots, a blog that has run, on and off, since December 2000
- amusing.org, which presents a different visitor-submitted sentence or phrase six times a week, often of a surreal or absurd nature, and also allows users to submit illustrations of past entries
- abevigoda.com, a site that shows Abe Vigoda's current "status" (alive or dead)
- Scribs, a webcomic that also has a "reader mail" section, in which readers submit questions for the two central characters to answer

Other notable projects included the Nipple Server (in which users rated pictures of Galcik's left nipple based on a rubric of panache, color, perkiness, and overall impression), and 1-900-ZWEBLÖ (an advice column in which web-submitted questions were answered by members of a fictitious secret cabal or shadow government).
