= Claire Keane =

American animator, illustrator and visual development artist

- Occupations: Author, illustrator
- Father: Glen Keane
- Relatives: Bil Keane (grandfather); Thelma Keane (grandmother); Jeff Keane (uncle)

Claire Keane is an author and illustrator and visual development artist who contributed to the Disney films Enchanted, Tangled, Wreck-It Ralph and Frozen. She is the daughter of Disney animator Glen Keane and Linda Hesselroth as well as the granddaughter of cartoonist Bil Keane, creator of the comic strip The Family Circus, and Thelma Keane.

== Early life ==
Keane grew up in California until, at the age of 16, she and her family moved to France. There, she attended the American School of Paris and the Paris outpost of the Parsons School of Design. Keane then studied at the École Supérieure D’arts Graphiques in Paris. She was encouraged to become a graphic designer. However, she realized that she preferred developing and exploring visuals and stories. Her father Glen Keane was just starting to develop the story of Tangled and told her they would soon need a visual development artist. Keane and her husband moved to Los Angeles where she worked at Disney Feature Animation for ten years designing for Tangled, Frozen and Enchanted among other films. In 2012, she left to work independently. Keane's first children's book Once Upon A Cloud came out in 2015 and her second book, Little Big Girl was published in the fall of 2016.

== Career ==
As a conceptual artist during the production of Tangled, Keane's work spanned the visual development seen throughout the entire film, but her work was arguably most visible as the murals the character Rapunzel paints on the wall of her home. For these, Keane hand painted the mural on a wall in the art department of the Walt Disney Animation Studios. Keane also illustrated the Disney storybook, Rapunzel's Amazing Hair. In 2020, she won an Emmy Award for her work on Tangled The Series.

For Enchanted, Keane worked with costume designer Mona May to help realize Giselle's dresses. In 2013, Keane left Disney to focus on writing and illustrating children's books. She released her first illustrated children's book: Once Upon A Cloud, which Kirkus Reviews felt displayed her background in working for Disney. Little Big Girl has a "retro" look to the illustrations.

The Cape Cod Times wrote that Keane's illustrations are a good match for Diane Adams' text in Love Is.

== Filmography ==
Year	Title	Credits
2007	Enchanted	Costume Illustrator
2008	Glago's Guest	Visual Development Artist
2010	Tangled	Visual Development Artist
2012	Wreck-it Ralph	Additional Visual Development Artist
2013	Frozen	Visual Development Artist
2014	Duet	Visual Development Artist
2017	Tangled (TV Series)	Visual Development Artist
2022	Puss in Boots: The Last Wish	Visual Development Artist

== Books ==
Year	Book Title	Credits
2010	Tangled: Rapunzel's Amazing Hair	Illustrator
2014	Lovely: Ladies of Animation	Co-author/artist
2015	Once Upon A Cloud	Author & Illustrator
2016	Little Big Girl	Author & Illustrator
2016	A Fairy Friend	Illustrator
2017	Love is	Illustrator
2020	Paolo: Emperor of Rome	Illustrator
2021	Not Yeti	Illustrator
2023	Make Way: The Story of Robert McCloskey, Nancy Schon, and Some Very Famous Ducklings	Illustrator
