= John Kahrs =

American actor, animator and film director

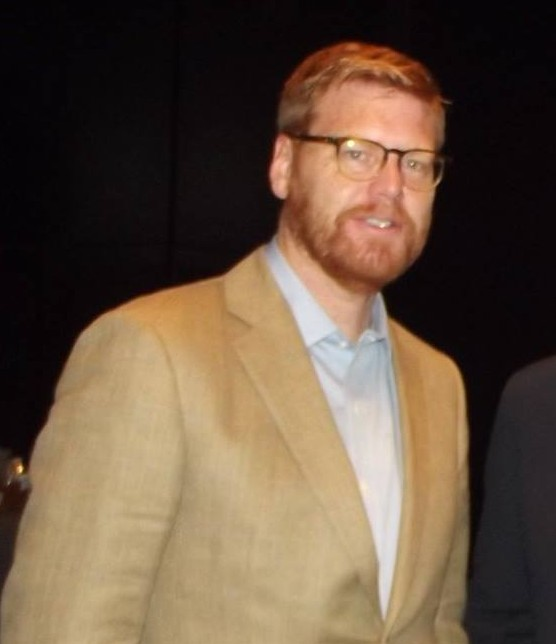
- Kahrs in 2018
- Born: September 18, 1967 (age 59); Hudson Valley, New York
- Education: Bachelor of Fine Arts Degree
- Alma mater: NSCAD University
- Occupations: Animator, director
- Years active: 1990–present
- Employer(s): Blue Sky Studios (1990-1997); Pixar Animation Studios (1997-2007); Walt Disney Animation Studios (2007-2013)
- Known for: Paperman
- Spouse: Gennie Rim

John Kahrs (born September 18, 1967) is an American actor, animator and film director.

Kahrs attended NSCAD University, graduating with a Bachelor of Fine Arts degree in 1990. He began his career at Blue Sky Studios in Connecticut, where he worked as an animator between 1990 and 1997. He later moved to Pixar, where he worked on such films as A Bug's Life, The Incredibles, and Ratatouille. After ten years at Pixar, he moved over to Disney, where he animated on Bolt, Wreck-It Ralph and Frozen, and was an animation supervisor on Tangled.

In 2013, he won an Academy Award for Best Animated Short Film for his 2012 short film, Paperman.

In August 2013, he left Walt Disney Animation Studios to develop his own projects. In January 2014, it was reported that he will direct for Paramount Animation an animated film Shedd. In 2020, he co-directed Over the Moon with Glen Keane, which was released on Netflix the same year. The film was nominated for the Academy Award for Best Animated Feature the following year, but lost to Soul.

== Filmography ==
Year	Title	Director	Animator	Effects	Actor	Role	Notes
1996	Joe’s Apartment			Yes			lighting designer
1998	Bunny			Yes			animation models, Short film
1998	A Bug's Life		Yes				
1999	Toy Story 2		Yes				
2001	Monsters, Inc.		Yes				Also character developer
2002	Mike's New Car		Yes				Short film
2004	The Incredibles		Yes				Also character developer
2006	Cars		Yes				
2007	Ratatouille		Yes				
2008	Bolt		Yes				
2010	Tangled		Yes				Animation supervisor
2012	Paperman	Yes			Yes	George	Short film
2012	Wreck-It Ralph		Yes				
2013	Frozen		Yes				
2016	June	Yes					
2018	Age of Sail	Yes					VR short film
2020	Over the Moon	Yes					Co-director with Glen Keane
2020	Trash Truck	Yes					Supervising Director (28 episodes), TV Series
2020	A Trash Truck Christmas	Yes					Supervising Director, Christmas Special
