= Gennie Rim =

American film producer

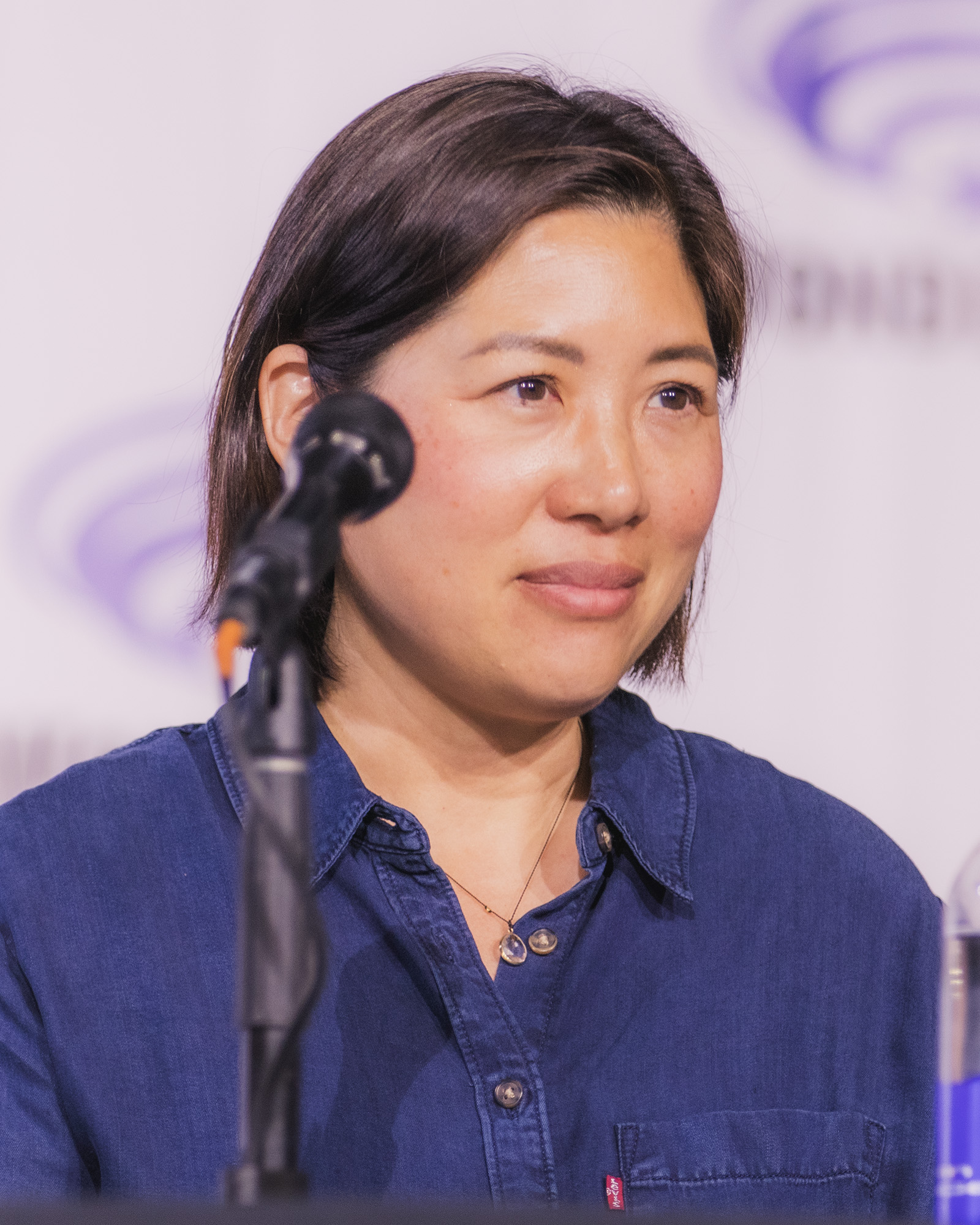
- Rim in 2026
- Born: Grand Rapids, Michigan
- Occupation: Film producer
- Years active: 1998-present
- Notable work: Dear Basketball, Over the Moon

Gennie Rim is an American producer who is best known for producing Academy Award-winning short film, Dear Basketball (2017), which won the Best Animated Short Film at the 90th Academy Awards, and Netflix's animated feature Over the Moon (2020) directed by Glen Keane, which was nominated for Best Animated Feature at the 93rd Academy Awards. She has worked at Pixar, Walt Disney Animation Studios, and Netflix.

== Career ==
In 1998, Rim began her animation career at Wild Brain Studios in San Francisco. She later moved to Pixar, where she worked on films such as The Incredibles, Cars, Ratatouille, and Up. In 2008, she joined Walt Disney Animation Studios.

In 2013, she became a producer with Glen Keane Productions. While there, she produced numerous projects such as Dear Basketball and Over the Moon, as well as Netflix's Emmy Award-winning pre-school series Trash Truck.

In 2021, Rim was named one of Variety’s 10 Producers to Watch

== Filmography ==
Year	Title	Credits	Format	Notes
2004	The Incredibles	Lighting production assistant and sets production assistant	Feature film	
2006	Cars	Lighting coordinator	Feature film	
2007	Ratatouille	Animation coordinator	Feature film	
2007	Your Friend the Rat	2D animation coordinator	Short film	
2008	Bolt	Production department manager	Feature film	
2009	Up	Additional production support	Feature film	
2012	Paperman	Artist Manager	Short film	
2014	Duet	Producer	Short film	
2015	Nephtali	Producer	Short film	
2016	June	Producer	Short film	
2017	Lux: Blinding Light	Producer	Short film	
2017	Dear Basketball	Producer	Short film	Academy Award for Best Animated Short Film
2018	Age of Sail	Producer	Short film	
2019	The Witness - Love, Death & Robots	Producer	Short film	Primetime Emmy Award for Animated Short Film
2020	A Trash Truck Christmas	Executive Producer	TV special	
2020 - 2021	Trash Truck	Executive Producer	TV series	
2020	Over the Moon	Producer	Feature film	Academy Award Nominee for Best Animated Feature Film
