= List of Pearls Before Swine books =

This is a list of collections and treasuries of the popular comic strip Pearls Before Swine by Stephan Pastis.

== Collections ==
Title	Publication Date	ISBN	Contents	Cover/title parody
Pearls Before Swine: BLTs Taste So Darn Good	March 2, 2003	ISBN 0-7407-3437-7	Strips from December 31, 2001, to October 6, 2002.	Title is taken from a line Pig said in the January 12, 2002 strip and cover features him eating a BLT.
This Little Piggy Stayed Home	March 1, 2004	ISBN 0-7407-3813-5	Strips from October 7, 2002, to July 13, 2003.	Title is taken from a line in the nursery rhyme "This Little Piggy"; cover shows Pig watching TV while everyone else leaves the house.
Nighthogs	March 1, 2005	ISBN 0-7407-5009-7	Strips from July 14, 2003, to April 18, 2004.	The title and cover are parodies of Edward Hopper painting "Nighthawks". Stephan Pastis stated that Hopper is one of his favorite artists, which may state why the parody is from "Nighthawks". Rat takes the place of the waiter behind the counter while Goat, Pig, and Zebra sit around it. The cover was originally one of Pastis' Sunday strip title panels.
The Ratvolution Will Not Be Televised	March 1, 2006	ISBN 0-7407-5674-5	Strips from April 19, 2004, to January 23, 2005.	Title is a parody of Gil Scott-Heron's poem/song The Revolution Will Not Be Televised, cover features a Croc, Rat, Goat, Zebra, Pig, and Rat's cartoon character, Dickie the Cockroach, as a militant group
Da Brudderhood of Zeeba Zeeba Eata	March 1, 2007	ISBN 0-7407-6801-8	Strips from January 24, 2005, through October 30, 2005.	The cover vaguely parodies the movie poster of Animal House (note the pirate costume on one of the crocodiles, similar to that worn by John Belushi in the film, and the toga worn by Rat and another Croc). Pig and Farina are seen on the house's balcony and Zebra is being chased by two of the Crocs.
The Sopratos	September 1, 2007	ISBN 0-7407-6847-6	Strips from October 31, 2005, to August 6, 2006.	Title and cover are a parody of The Sopranos TV series; various characters that were killed off in prior strips appear buried in the dirt
Macho Macho Animals	September 1, 2008	ISBN 0-7407-7369-0	Strips from August 7, 2006, to May 13, 2007.	Title and cover parody the Village People; the title is a play on the song title "Macho Man" and Larry, Zebra, Guard Duck, Rat, Pig, and Goat are all dressed as members of the Village People. Bil Keane provides the foreword.
The Saturday Evening Pearls	March 17, 2009	ISBN 0-7407-7391-7	Contains strips from May 14, 2007, to February 16, 2008.	Title and cover are a parody of The Saturday Evening Post. The cover setting parodies the painting "Freedom from Want" by Norman Rockwell, a regular illustrator for the Post. In this case, various crocodiles are sitting around a table while Patty (Larry the croc's wife) serves Zebra for dinner and Rat, Pig, and Guard Duck watch on in horror.
50,000,000 Pearls Fans Can't Be Wrong	April 6, 2010	ISBN 0-7407-9141-9	Contains strips from February 17, 2008, to November 16, 2008.	Title and cover are a parody of the Elvis Presley album 50,000,000 Elvis Fans Can't Be Wrong; Pastis is featured on the front cover by himself in various sizes while wearing an Elvis costume, and on the back he is confronted by Pig, Rat, Larry, and Goat – Rat calls it the "worst, most arrogant cover ever", Pig urges Pastis to get help, Larry says "me want keel you", and Goat demands to know when he gets a cover to himself. 50,000,000 Pearls Fans Can't Be Wrong is the first Pearls collection to feature full-color Sunday strips; publisher Andrews McMeel Publishing has begun to print Sunday strips in color in many of its regular-sized comic collections after strictly limiting them to treasury-sized books for years.
When Pigs Fly	September 7, 2010	ISBN 0-7407-9737-9	Contains strips from November 17, 2008, to August 22, 2009.	Title is taken from the old saying "When pigs fly." Cover features Pig participating in a slam dunk contest while various Pearls characters and Stephan Pastis watch on. Features "The Unseen Pearls", eleven strips from the web-only days of Pearls that Stephan Pastis refused to publish in newspapers with annotations by the cartoonist (the first time Pastis provides annotations for a regular collection).
Larry in Wonderland	October 4, 2011	ISBN 1-4494-0817-6	Contains strips from August 23, 2009, to May 23, 2010.	Title refers to, and cover art illustrates, a storyline from the comic strip that appears in the book. Both parody Alice's Adventures in Wonderland (or Alice in Wonderland).
Because Sometimes You Just Gotta Draw a Cover with Your Left Hand	April 10, 2012	ISBN 1-4494-1023-5	Contains strips from May 24, 2010, to February 27, 2011.	Cover does not feature a parody. Title refers to a stunt Pastis pulled for this book where he drew the cover picture and hand wrote the intro, title, and blurbs entirely with his non-drawing hand (he draws Pearls with his right hand).
Unsportsmanlike Conduct	February 12, 2013	ISBN 978-1-4494-2774-0	Contains strips from February 28, 2011, to December 4, 2011.	Cover depicts Stephan Pastis and Rat in a boxing match with Goat as the referee. Rat kicks Pastis in his "oompa loompas" (running joke word for testicles in the strip) while Goat tries to step in. Pig, Zebra, and Guard Duck work Pastis' corner while Larry and Snuffles work Rat's, and a poorly-drawn Dilbert is shown watching the fight.
Rat's Wars	October 1, 2013	ISBN 978-1-4494-2936-2	Contains strips from December 5, 2011, to September 2, 2012	The cover parodies Star Wars, featuring numerous Pearls characters as characters in the space franchise. Particularly, Rat is depicted as Luke Skywalker, Pig as Princess Leia, Goat and Snuffles as C-3PO and R2-D2, the Crocs as X-wing Fighters, and Stephan Pastis as Darth Vader.
Breaking Stephan	November 4, 2014	ISBN 978-1-4494-5830-0	Contains strips from September 3, 2012, to June 2, 2013	The cover parodies the TV series Breaking Bad. The title artwork is styled like the show's, using symbols from the periodic table as the first letters of each word. The characters are standing in the middle of a desert with an RV issuing red smoke in the background. Pastis is depicted as Walter White from the show's pilot, holding a pencil and comic strip instead of a gun. Rat and Pig are dressed in yellow Hazmat suits similar to the ones worn by Walt and Jesse. Goat is dressed as Gus Fring holding a bucket of fried chicken with Guard Duck's picture on it. Snuffles is depicted as Hector Salamanca, sitting in a wheelchair ringing a bell. The words "Santa Rosa or Bust" can be read on the side of the RV, a nod to Pastis's home town, as can the name "Julia", while the name "Tom" can be seen in the background; these are nods to Pastis' two children.
King of the Comics	March 17, 2015	ISBN 978-1-4494-5828-7	Contains strips from June 3, 2013, to March 2, 2014	The cover and title roughly parody the film Titanic. Cartoon Pastis is standing on the bow railing of a large ocean liner—the S.S. Pearls—shouting with arms extended, much like Jack from the film when he shouts, "I'm the king of the world!". He has a rope tied around his chest, which Rat has attached to an anchor and is about to drop into the ocean. Pig is also standing on the railing, heaving violently into a seasickness bag. Goat stands by drinking a cup of coffee. The Lemmings are diving from the deck into the sea on one side of the ship, and the Crocs are wading in the surf on the other side. Zebra, Guard Duck, Elly Elephant, and Danny Donkey also appear as background characters. In the forward, Pastis talks about his trip to Muncie, Indiana to meet Garfield creator Jim Davis.
I'm Only in This for Me	May 3, 2016	ISBN 978-1-4494-7626-7	Contains strips from March 3, 2014, to December 6, 2014	The cover depicts a political rally with Rat running for President of the United States. Rat is standing at a lectern, dressed in a suit and tie and an Uncle Sam hat, giving an impassioned speech. Goat, Larry the Croc, Guard Duck, Pig, and Zebra are standing around the podium wearing dark sunglasses, acting as Rat's security detail. In addition to several other Pearls characters attending the rally, characters from other strips are also shown, including Dilbert from the comic of the same name, Charlie Brown from Peanuts, and Jeffy from Family Circus. On the back cover, Rat is holding up a poster of himself, a parody of Shepard Fairey's Barack Obama "Hope" poster. Instead of "Hope", the poster reads "Despair." This collection features the strips where Pastis allowed Bill Watterson to draw the strip.
Stephan's Web	November 22, 2016	ISBN 978-1-4494-8202-2	Contains strips from December 7, 2014, to September 6, 2015	The title parodies the classic children's novel Charlotte's Web by E. B. White, and the cover is itself a parody of Garth Williams' illustrated cover for White's book. Cartoon Stephan takes the place of Fern, complete with red dress and ponytail. Pig stands in for Wilbur. Goat stands in for the sheep, and Guard Duck stands in for the goose. Instead of Charlotte, Rat is seen strung upside down from the spider web. The words "of Lies" can be seen written into the web, making the full title appear to be "Stephan's Web of Lies". A silver medal with an image of Danny Donkey also appears on the cover, showing the words "Not an Honor Book", parodying the Newbery Medal that appears on Charlotte's Web and many other notable children's books.
I Scream, You Scream, We All Scream Because Puns Suck	September 12, 2017	ISBN 978-1-4494-8380-7	Contains strips from September 7, 2015, to June 5, 2016	The title parodies the popular phrase/song title, I Scream, You Scream, We All Scream for Ice Cream. The cover parodies the Edvard Munch painting, The Scream. In place of the painting's central figure stands Pig, screaming in horror and disbelief while animated Pastis stands in the background saying, "Wait...I have more puns."
Floundering Fathers	March 20, 2018	ISBN 978-1-4494-8934-2	Contains strips from June 6, 2016, to March 11, 2017	The title parodies the founding fathers. The cover is a parody of the Emanuel Leutze painting, Washington Crossing the Delaware. Animated Pastis takes the place of George Washington in the painting, while the strip's main characters – including Jef the Cyclist and an inebriated Danny Donkey – serve as his shipmates and oarsmen. The Comic Strip Censor is seen in the water off the side of the boat being struck by an oar, and Jeffy from The Family Circus is floundering in the water nearby, pleading to be brought on board.

== Treasuries ==
Treasuries contain two books in one binding with Sunday strips in color, plus insight from Stephan Pastis. Starting with The Crass Menagerie, the covers feature live-action Stephan Pastis and backgrounds, with the comic's characters (in their usual drawn appearance) added in. While the shorter collections stopped after Floundering Fathers, the treasuries are still ongoing.

Title	Publication Date	ISBN	Contents	Title/cover parody
Sgt. Piggy's Lonely Hearts Club Comic	September 1, 2004	ISBN 0-7407-4807-6	Strips from BLTs Taste So Darn Good and This Little Piggy Stayed Home (December 31, 2001 to July 13, 2003); Annotations by the cartoonist; Character(s)/object(s)-on-cover quiz, a true test of knowledge for Pearls Before Swine fanatics	Title and cover parody The Beatles album Sgt. Pepper's Lonely Hearts Club Band.
Lions and Tigers and Crocs, Oh My!	September 1, 2006	ISBN 0-7407-6155-2	Strips from Nighthogs and The Ratvolution Will Not Be Televised (July 14, 2003 to January 23, 2005); annotations by the cartoonist; The Good, The Banned and The Ugly, a collection of 17 strips which never ran in newspapers.	Cover parodies The Wizard of Oz, title parodies a line from the film ("Lions and Tigers and Bears, oh my!"). Pig portrays the Scarecrow, Rat the Tin Man, Goat Dorothy, Zebra the Cowardly Lion, and the Crocs the Flying Monkeys. Dickie the Cockroach can be seen in the poppy field.
The Crass Menagerie	March 28, 2008	ISBN 0-7407-7100-0	Strips from Da Brudderhood of Zeeba Zeeba Eata and The Sopratos (January 24, 2005 to August 5, 2006); annotations by the cartoonist; Not Yet Ready for Prime Time Comic Strips, a collection of strips which never ran in newspapers including one strip that was never finished.	Title parodies Tennessee Williams's play The Glass Menagerie; cover does not feature a parody but instead features the Pearls characters (sans Pig) running amok and destroying Stephan Pastis' office while Pastis watches in disbelief.
Pearls Sells Out	August 18, 2009	ISBN 0-7407-7396-8	Strips from Macho Macho Animals and The Saturday Evening Pearls (dating from August 6, 2006, to February 16, 2008); annotations by the cartoonist; Stuff You Ain't Never Seen Before, a collection of strips which never ran in newspapers.	Title references the release of several Pearls characters as plush dolls prior to the release of this treasury. Cover does not feature a parody but places Stephan Pastis, Pig, Guard Duck, Snuffles the cat, Andy the Dog, several crocodiles, and Rat in a store aisle selling plushies; the crocodiles tear apart the Zebra plushies while Pastis looks on in frustration and Rat tries to steal his wallet. A Danny Donkey doll ("includes beer!") and a Snoopy doll wearing a Fez are inexplicably placed on one of the shelves. The back cover features Pig cleaning up the mess, including a destroyed Dilbert plushie.
Pearls Blows Up	March 22, 2011	ISBN 1-4494-0106-6	Strips From 50,000,000 Pearls Fans Can't Be Wrong and When Pigs Fly (dating from February 17, 2008, to August 23, 2009); annotations by the cartoonist; Portrait of a Cartoonist as a Young Man, several pages of photographs from various points in Stephan Pastis' life from childhood to adulthood.	Cover illustrates a literal explosion triggered by Snuffles the cat as Guard Duck tries to stop him. Stephan Pastis, Rat, Goat, Pig, Danny Donkey, Larry, Zebra, Pig's sister Farina, Hobart the Miniature Train Engineer, and the Killer Whale are seen flying through the air due to the explosion.
Pearls Freaks the #*%# Out	September 25, 2012	ISBN 1-4494-2302-7	Strips from Larry in Wonderland and Because Sometimes You Just Gotta Draw a Cover With Your Left Hand (dating from August 23, 2009, to February 27, 2011); annotations by the cartoonist; Pastis features "The Drawings you Probably Never Saw", explaining that he is required to submit a title panel for his strip regardless of whether the paper allows space for it (most do not) and shows the user several different ones he used before adopting one universal title panel.	Cover art depicts Pastis as a carnival barker promoting a freak show that features Rat, Goat, Larry, Pig and a drunken, unconscious Danny Donkey. Pastis is joined by model Gwen Hefner, who poses as his assistant.
Pearls Falls Fast	March 18, 2014	ISBN 1-4494-4659-0	Strips from Unsportsmanlike Conduct and Rat's Wars (dating from February 28, 2011, to September 3, 2012); annotations by the cartoonist; includes "Wading Into the Kiddie Pool", a collection of drawings that Pastis drew as a child.	Cover art depicts various Pearls characters riding a roller coaster (specifically the Mamba from Worlds of Fun in Kansas City). Stephan Pastis, Rat, Goat, Larry, Snuffles, Guard Duck, Elly Elephant, Larry's wife Patty, and a poorly drawn Dilbert are inside the coaster while Zebra, Danny Donkey, two suicidal lemmings, and the killer whale are falling out. The logo on the roller coaster reads "Pastisland". Back cover shows Pastis with his head in one of the park's trash cans, throwing up after being on the roller coaster.
Pearls Gets Sacrificed	September 22, 2015	ISBN 1-4494-5829-7	Strips from Breaking Stephan and King of the Comics (September 4, 2012 to March 2, 2014); annotations by the cartoonist; includes Pearls stickers.	Cover art depicts Pastis (referred to by a sign as "Le Punster"), Rat, and Pig being burned at the stake in medieval times. Surrounding the stake are two angry senior citizens, several angry crocs with one wearing a shirt that says " kill Steffin", two boys reading Rat's Wars in shock while their mother (Gwen Hefner, who played Pastis' assistant on the cover of Pearls Freaks the #*%# Out) tries to light the stake, and a critical newspaper editor. Also appearing on the cover are Dilbert, Cathy, and Garfield from their eponymous comic strips, Duke from Doonesbury, Wanda McPherson from Baby Blues, Jason Fox from FoxTrot, Alice Otterloop from Cul de Sac, and Jeffy from The Family Circus. Back cover features a medieval map of Venice with the famous Family Circus dotted line trail drawn all over it and Jeffy carrying a torch.
Pearls Hogs the Road	April 25, 2017	ISBN 1-4494-8366-6	Strips from I'm Only in This for Me and Stephan's Web (March 3, 2014 to September 6, 2015); annotations by the cartoonist; bonus section consists of several Pearls Before Swine comics edited by Pastis himself to remove a character or speech balloons, inspired by Garfield Minus Garfield.	Cover art depicts the front of a biker bar. Pastis is seated on a red bicycle, complete with handlebar tassels and a safety flag. He is dressed in athletic shorts and a sleeveless T-shirt reading "Ladies Man", as well as sunglasses and a sweatband. Eyeing him suspiciously is a biker gang consisting of Goat, Guard Duck, Larry the Croc, Rat, Pig, and a Lemming. Amidst the gang seated on a red motorcycle is a blonde biker chick. A human biker stands in the doorway to the bar, leering over his sunglasses at Pastis. Jef the Cyclist and Snuffles also peer out from the bar's front window. A promo poster on the building's exterior reads "LIVE: The Crass Menagerie", a nod back to an earlier Pearls treasury.
Pearls Takes a Wrong Turn	October 23, 2018	ISBN 1-4494-8936-2	Strips from I Scream, You Scream, We All Scream Because Puns Suck and Floundering Fathers (September 7, 2015 to March 11, 2017); annotations by the cartoonist	Cover art is black and white, stylized like a scene from a film noir movie. In a narrow alley, Human Pastis leans against a building smoking a cigarette, wearing a suit, trench coat, and fedora. A blonde femme fatale seductively shows him her leg from around a corner, while brandishing a chef's knife out of his sight. Waiting with the woman are an angry-looking Rat, holding a baseball bat, and Guard Duck, holding a grenade. Pig is also with them, though he is distracted by a game of paddle ball. On the other side of the alley, behind some trash cans, are a nervous-looking Croc, holding a handgun, and Snuffles (also wearing a fedora), brandishing a morning star.
Pearls Goes Hollywood	March 24, 2020	ISBN 1-5248-5561-8	First treasury with entirely all-new strips, from March 12, 2017, to September 30, 2018; annotations by the cartoonist; includes an essay by Pastis about his foray into film directing	Cover features a movie set for a scene called "Pastis Dies" in a western environment. Human Pastis (dressed as a cowboy) is tied to railroad tracks as a steam locomotive approaches. The main characters (sans Zebra), along with Jef the Cyclist and Danny Donkey, act as the crew for the film set with Rat as director.
Pearls Awaits the Tide	November 23, 2021	ISBN 1-5248-6893-0	All-new strips, from October 1, 2018, to March 29, 2020; annotations by the cartoonist; includes Pastis' 2017 acceptance speech for his Reuben Award	Cover features a scene at the beach. Human Pastis is buried neck-deep in the sand. Rat stands nearby with a shovel, while a horrified Pig and indifferent Goat look on. The Comic Strip Censor sits in a beach chair nearby reading a newspaper beneath a large green beach umbrella. One of the Crocs is peering over the top of the umbrella, also apparently watching Pastis. Next to the beach chair is a red cooler, with Guard Duck sitting atop it also looking at Pastis. In the background, an overweight human male lifeguard walks by, surveying the scene.
Pearls Seeks Enlightenment	June 6, 2023	ISBN 1-5248-7924-X	All-new strips, from March 30, 2020, to October 10, 2021; annotations by the cartoonist	Cover features Pastis climbing to the top of a mountain, to meet the Wise Ass on the Hill. Rat is tied to the top by a rope attached to a spike in the ground. Pig is falling. Guard duck is looking up. The crocodiles are trying to boost one another to the top. Jef the Cyclist is also climbing up. Goat is peering around the corner.
Pearls Gets Put in the Pokey	October 22, 2024	ISBN 978-1-5248-9296-8	All-new strips, from October 11, 2021 to April 9, 2023; annotations by the cartoonist	Cover features Stephan, Rat, Pig, Larry, the Wise Ass on the Hill, and Guard Duck in a prison cell. Stephan is laughing while reading Pearls Seeks Enlightenment, Pig is lifting weights, Rat peers in through a hole in the wall with a shovel in his hand, Larry is in the toilet reading the comic section of the Los Angeles Times and Guard Duck is seen bribing a prison guard. Pictures of Stephan are posted throughout the cell and a tattooed prisoner smokes a cigar.
Pearls Gets Plastered	October 28, 2025	ISBN 978-1-5248-9297-5	All-new strips, from April 10, 2023 to October 6, 2024; annotations by the cartoonist	Cover features Stephan, Rat, Pig, Goat, the Crocs, one of the Lemmings, the Comic Strip Censor, the Wise Ass on the Hill, Guard Duck, and Snuffles in an early 20th century-style bar. Stephan is passed out with soiled pants, the crocs laugh at him and give him a sign that reads “Dis guy loozer”, Goat is reading the newspaper, Pig is giving flowers to a waitress, a lemming stares into an urn, Guard Duck and Sniffles are playing poker, and two mustachioed men (played by Bill Amend and Stephan’s editor Reed Jackson) are yelling at Rat who is drinking beer from a spigot.
Pearls Jubilee	December 8, 2026	ISBN 978-1-5248-9298-2	A celebration of 25 years of Pearls, with fan-favorite strips and annotations by the cartoonist	Cover features a 25th Anniversary party for Pearls Before Swine. Real-life Stephan is twirling his jacket with his bow tie visibly untied while cartoon Stephan, Goat and Jef the Cyclist look on, Pig, Rat and Guard Duck sit on the table, Pigita, the comic strip censor and the killer whale stand on the floor, Zebra, a croc, a lion, a hyena, and Snuffles are chasing each other, Larry’s wife and Elly Elephant stand on a stage with a red curtain, two lemmings celebrate with champagne glasses while Stephan’s wife Staci looks on, and Wise Ass sits on a pile of Pearls books. Rat and Stephan are holding beer cans that say “Emilio” and “Julia” respectively, referencing Stephan’s daughter and best friend.

== Gift books ==
Title	Publication Date	ISBN	Contents	Cover/title parody
Da Crockydile Book o' Frendsheep	September 1, 2008	ISBN 0-7407-7627-4	Contains strips supposedly selected by the crocodiles with a "frendsheep"-related theme, including several that had not yet run in a Pearls collection.	Cover features two members of the Zeeba Zeeba Eata fraternity smiling, with one having his arm around the other who has his thumb up; features an introduction written by Pastis in croc-style language

== AMP! books ==
Title	Publication Date	ISBN	Contents	Cover/title parody
Beginning Pearls	July 19, 2013	ISBN 978-1-4494-2303-2	Strips selected to be appropriate for younger readers as part of Andrews McMeel Publishing's AMP! Comics for Kids series; Features section introductions written by the featured characters.	Title parodies school textbooks; Cover features Rat and Pig jumping
The Croc Ate My Homework	June 1, 2014	ISBN 9781449436360	Strips selected to be appropriate for younger readers as part of Andrews McMeel Publishing's AMP! Comics for Kids series	Title parodies "dog ate my homework" excuse for un-returned assignments; Cover features a crocodile with a piece of written paper sticking out of his mouth
Skip School, Fly to Space	August 4, 2015	ISBN 9781449436377	Strips selected to be appropriate for younger readers as part of Andrews McMeel Publishing's AMP! Comics for Kids series	Title references a strip where a boy named Willy decides to join Pig in his adventures of imagination, apart from his stressful pursuit of higher education. Cover features Pig and Willy wearing homemade astronaut helmets, flying through space in a cardboard box labeled "Rockitt Shipp"
When Crocs Fly	July 12, 2016	ISBN 9781449476274	Strips selected to be appropriate for younger readers as part of Andrews McMeel Publishing's AMP! Comics for Kids series	Title parodies the adynaton "when pigs fly". Cover features three crocs falling from the sky flapping their arms uselessly, referencing a strip where they forgot their parachute equipment.
Suit Your Selfie	July 18, 2017	ISBN 9781449483753	Strips selected to be appropriate for younger readers as part of Andrews McMeel Publishing's AMP! Comics for Kids series	Title parodies the phrase "suit yourself". Cover features Rat and Pig taking a selfie on Rat's cell phone.
