= Dysfunctional Family Circus =

Humorous website for submitting new captions to comic strips

The Dysfunctional Family Circus was the name of several long-running parodies of the syndicated comic strip The Family Circus, featuring either Bil Keane's artwork with altered captions, or (less often) original artwork made to appear like the targeted strips. First distributed anonymously by mail and fax in 1989, by 1994 various versions of it began to appear on the World Wide Web. The most popular version, edited by Greg Galcik, began in 1995 and ceased in 1999 following a telephone conversation between Galcik and Keane.

== DFC booklets ==
In 1989, The Dysfunctional Family Circus was created anonymously and began circulating as a series of booklets found in record and book stores, coffee houses, and nightclubs in several U.S. and European cities, notably San Francisco, Chicago, New York, London, and Madrid. They were also distributed by mail to those making requests and posting their mailing address to select Usenet groups.

The booklet series included 15 titles:

- Grandma's Not Dead Yet!
- See, I Told You Cats Could Smell Dead People!
- Ibex, My Ass! That's a Goat!
- Who Wants to See a Hamster Dance?
- Eat Snow Hobo!
- Grandma's Starting to Sprout!
- It All Comes Back, Except One Tablespoon!
- This Guy's Wankin' Off!
- Wait, I Think My Dick's Stuck!
- Boy, This Dog is Fucked Up!
- Oh Yeah? Well, Kiss This!
- Her, Us, Motel, Tonight!
- Crotch Shot!
- Mommy! PJ's Tryin' to Get Out!
- Holy Shit! It's a Priesty Boy!

Each booklet measured 4 1/4 by 5 1/2 inches (11 cm × 14 cm) and each was attributed to a different nonexistent publisher; each "publisher's" name was a different anagram of "Bil Keane". A French translation of volume No. 4, entitled "Qui Veut Voir Un Hamster Dansant?" ("Who Wants To See A Dancing Hamster?"), was distributed by mail, as was an unnumbered volume entitled "Guess Where I Can Fit This!". Before being retired, the booklets spawned two annual calendars, a T-shirt, and a set of drink coasters.

=== Publication ===
The first two issues were 16 pages each. Issue 3 expanded to 40 pages. The remaining issues in the main series were 32 pages apiece. The initial press run for each issue was 250 copies. Issues 5 and 8 had secondary runs of 100 copies each.

Several cartoons from the booklets were reprinted in the Anderson Valley Advertiser in Boonville, California, and Browbeat magazine. Others were reproduced in fanzines and as inserts for CDs by the National Hardwood Floor Association and others. Only one cartoon (No. 5, page 14) used the original cartoon caption ("The party's not over yet — I just came home to get my siren and handcuffs").

== SpinnWebe ==
=== Forerunners ===
Often called "DFC", the Dysfunctional Family Circus was first brought to the World Wide Web by Mark Jason Dominus around March 1994. This version featured one (later expanded to four) original Keane cartoon without captions, and ran submission software to allow viewers to suggest their own captions. Captions were mostly unfiltered. It was discontinued after about a year, and the concept was adopted by Greg Galcik.

=== Galcik's version ===
Galcik's version became the best known (or perhaps most notorious) and ran on SpinnWebe from June 1995 to 1999 with a run of exactly 500 comics. It attracted between 50,000 and 70,000 page views per day. Galcik and other editors would select the captions they considered to be the funniest and most original, which would then be saved in an online archive. The humor of these captions ranged from what many would consider the disgusting to the surreal, and from the lowbrow to the cerebral. Bil Keane was aware of the site's existence from early on and initially had no objection to it, stating that the jokes were sometimes better than his own. His publisher later sent a cease-and-desist letter, which was initially ridiculed on the website, but after a telephone conversation between Galcik and Keane, Dysfunctional Family Circus was taken down.

Several running jokes developed over the 500 strip run of the series. Recurring themes included incest and child abuse jokes; aspects of the art itself, such as the featureless void (as Keane's comics frequently lacked a background); and Jeffy's Hypno-Hair (the character's wavy hair was used in parodies to hypnotize others in the family). Another parody theme was to portray the parents as unfaithful to each other, including Thel claiming to not know who any of the children's real fathers are and Bil having an unseen homosexual lover "Uncle" Roy. Another running joke involved breaking the fourth wall to comment on what Bil drew in the strip that day; when Thel was vacuuming with many toys strewn about, one such caption was "That dickhead Bil would draw all this shit in here the one day I vacuum!", and in some others the children were aware that they were stuck within the "circle" that framed the strip, such as when the scene was full of Christmas presents and a submitted caption was "I tell ya, we could hawk more stuff if you just made the circle bigger!"

=== End of Galcik's DFC ===
In September 1999, Galcik received a warning letter from King Features Syndicate (publishers of The Family Circus), citing copyright violations on the site. Despite the support of the site's fans, Galcik complied after a phone conversation with Keane. In his closing statement, Galcik said while he believed that Dysfunctional Family Circus could be defended as a work of interactive parody, he had developed a grudging respect for the long and continual effort by Bil Keane. Galcik noted that Keane was both polite and gracious in his request for the strip to end, pointing out that the characters being parodied were based on Keane's own family. Keane also agreed to allow Galcik to continue the strip for an additional week in order to reach strip No. 500. The captions for the 500th and final strip were completed in November 1999. Despite King Features' wishes, archives of the series have repeatedly appeared in various sites around the web.

After DFC ended, SpinnWebe continued to run "It's A Dysfunctional Life" (later renamed "A1-AAA AmeriCaptions"), which applied the Dysfunctional Family Circus's parody-by-captions concept to viewer-submitted photographs instead of to the cartoons.

== Themes ==
- Alcoholism
- Animal cruelty
- Cannibalism
- Drug abuse
- Existentialism
- Feminization
- Film homage
- Hallucinations
- Homophobia
- Incest
- Metafiction
- Murder
- Oral sex
- Promiscuity
- Racism
- Sacrilege
- Scatology
- Sexual abuse
