= Feast (2014 film) =

- Poster illustrated by Jeff Turley
- Directed by: Patrick Osborne
- Written by: Patrick Osborne
- Story by: Nicole Mitchell; Raymond S. Persi
- Produced by: Kristina Reed
- Starring: Tommy Snider; Katie Lowes
- Edited by: Jeff Draheim
- Music by: Alex Ebert
- Animation by: Brian Scott (head of animation)
- Production company: Walt Disney Animation Studios
- Distributed by: Walt Disney Studios; Motion Pictures (Note: Distributed by Walt Disney Studios Motion Pictures through the Walt Disney Pictures banner.)
- Release dates: June 10, 2014 (Annecy); November 7, 2014 (with Big Hero 6)
- Running time: 6 minutes
- Country: United States
- Language: English

Feast is an American animated romantic comedy short film written and directed by Patrick Osborne from a story by Raymond S. Persi and Nicole Mitchell, and produced by Walt Disney Animation Studios. It made its world premiere on June 10, 2014, at the Annecy International Animated Film Festival and debuted in theaters with Big Hero 6 on November 7 of the same year. The short is about a Boston Terrier named Winston, his experiences bonding with his owner, James, over the food they share and his owner's relationship with a waitress named Kirby.

The short won both an Academy Award for Best Animated Short Film at the 87th Academy Awards, and the Annie Award for Best Animated Short Subject at the 42nd Annie Awards.

== Plot ==
While licking at discarded fast food wrappers, a stray male Boston Terrier puppy spots a French fry dropped on the ground and eats it. James, the man who dropped the fry, offers a second one to the puppy and decides to adopt him as his pet. James names him Winston and begins feeding him portions of his own meals and junk food in addition to regular kibble.

One day, James begins a relationship with Kirby, a waitress at a local restaurant. She persuades him to take up a healthier diet and lifestyle, but the change upsets Winston as the leftovers James slips to him now consist of vegetables, which disgust him. However, the couple break up after an argument, sending James into a deep depression and causing him to revert to his old eating habits. Winston is initially excited to eat junk food again, but he soon recognizes James's low spirits. Seeing a piece of parsley that has reminded James of Kirby and the meals they used to prepare together, Winston decides to reunite them and steals it, leading to a chase as he brings it to Kirby and overcomes several temptations of delicious food. James follows Winston to the restaurant, where he reconciles with Kirby, and the two marry soon afterward. Winston, relieved that his master is happy again, is initially content to eat normal dog food.

Some time after the couple have moved into a new house, Winston spots a couple of meatballs that have rolled across the kitchen floor and eats them. Following the trail of sauce they have left behind, he reaches the base of a high chair occupied by the couple's infant child, who happily throws another meatball to him. As the film ends, Winston has once again begun feasting on his owner's leftovers, gleefully devouring cupcakes at the baby's first birthday party.

== Voice cast ==
- Ben Bledsoe
- Stewart Levine
- Katie Lowes
- Brandon Scott
- Adam Shapiro
- Tommy Snider
- Stephen Apostolina

== Production ==
=== Development ===
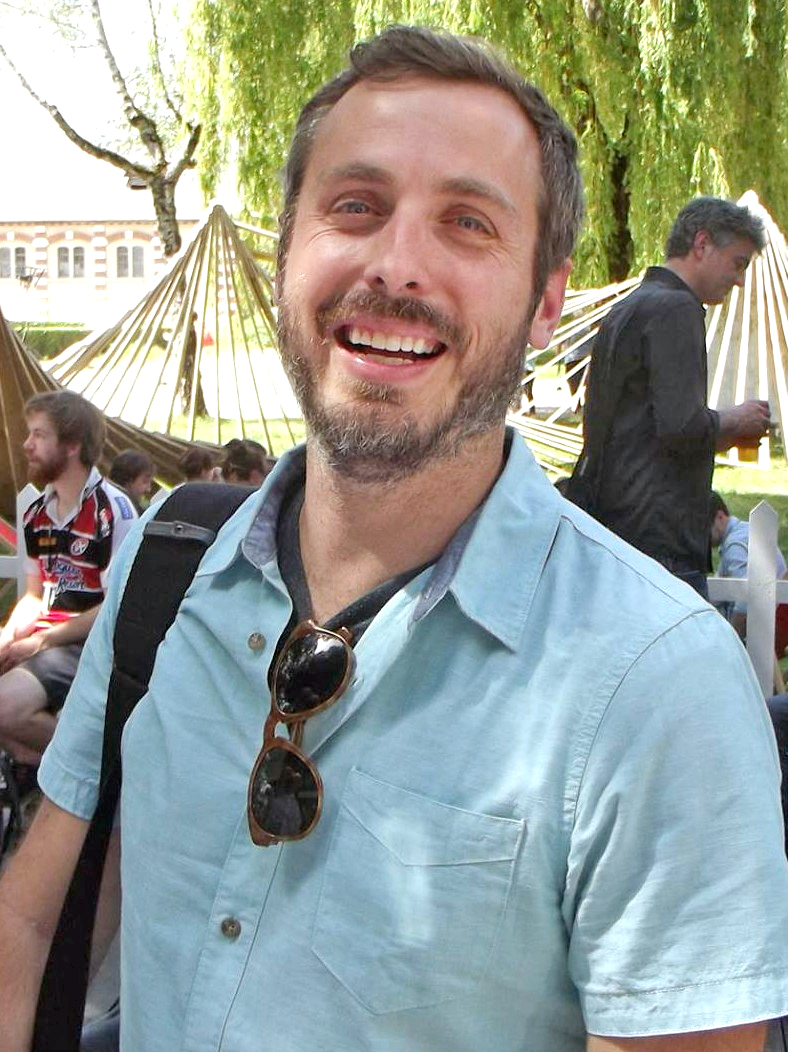
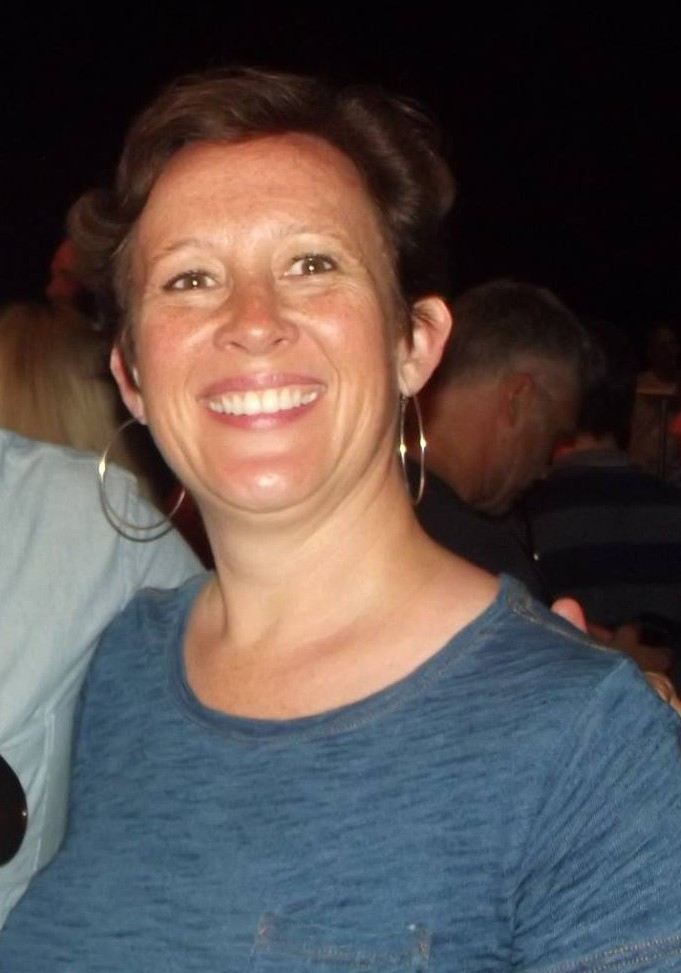
Director Patrick Osborne and producer Kristina Reed premiered the short at the 2014 Annecy International Animated Film Festival.

Prior to working on Feast, Patrick Osborne was co-head of animation on Big Hero 6. The idea for the short film started from an app called 1secondeveryday, which allows a user to record 1-second-long video snippets each day and cut them into a film. Osborne used the app to create a film of dinners he ate in 2012, which he thought could form the basis for a nice short film.

Following the previous Walt Disney Animation Studios short films Paperman and Get a Horse!, the studio decided to formalize a program for pitching shorts. Pixar had long had a steady system for producing short films to accompany theatrical releases, but it was something that Disney Animation no longer generally did. The program was open to pitches from any Walt Disney Animation Studios employee. Osborne pitched his idea to tell a story about a family from the perspective of their dog through the meals they eat. The project was green-lit in October 2013, with a deadline of June 10, 2014, for premiere at Annecy; Feast was completed three days before the festival. Feast was the first film that Osborne has directed.

=== Animation and style ===
Feast was animated using the Meander system developed for Paperman, and was the first time the tool was used in color. Feast was rendered using Hyperion, the rendering system built for Big Hero 6.

The characters and environment feature a line-free style with solid blocks of color. The camera focused on Winston and the food while leaving the human characters generally out of focus: it is only when Winston starts paying attention to the humans instead of just food that they are more clearly seen. Because the film consists of a series of very brief scenes cut together, the foods portrayed had to be appetizing and recognizable at first glance.

Winston was made a Boston Terrier for three main reasons. The filmmakers wanted a breed that does not appear in any prior Disney film. The breed is small so that he can be shown being promoted to a chair at the table and demoted back to the floor. Because of the flat style of the film, a breed with distinct markings like the Boston Terrier helps cue the audience to subtle movements.

== Home media ==
Feast made its home media debut on the Blu-ray and DVD releases of Big Hero 6 on February 24, 2015. Feast is also included with the digital iTunes release of Big Hero 6. Feast was released on the Walt Disney Animation Studios Short Films Collection Blu-ray on August 18, 2015.

== Reception ==
=== Critical response ===
Writing for Variety, critic Peter Debruge described the audience reaction at the Annecy International Animated Film Festival, saying that "to call Feast a hit with that crowd would be an understatement". As the credits rolled, the audience clapped loudly and stomped their feet on the bleacher seating.

=== Accolades ===
Feast won the Annie Award for Best Animated Short Subject at the 42nd Annie Awards and the Academy Award for Best Animated Short Film at the 87th Academy Awards.

List of awards and nominations
Award	Date of ceremony	Category	Recipient	Result	Ref(s)
6th 3D Creative Arts Awards	January 28, 2015	Best 3D Animated Short/Narrative		Won	
87th Academy Awards	February 22, 2015	Best Animated Short Film	Patrick Osborne and Kristina Reed	Won	
42nd Annie Awards	January 31, 2015	Best Animated Short Subject		Won	
