= Kristina Reed =

American film producer

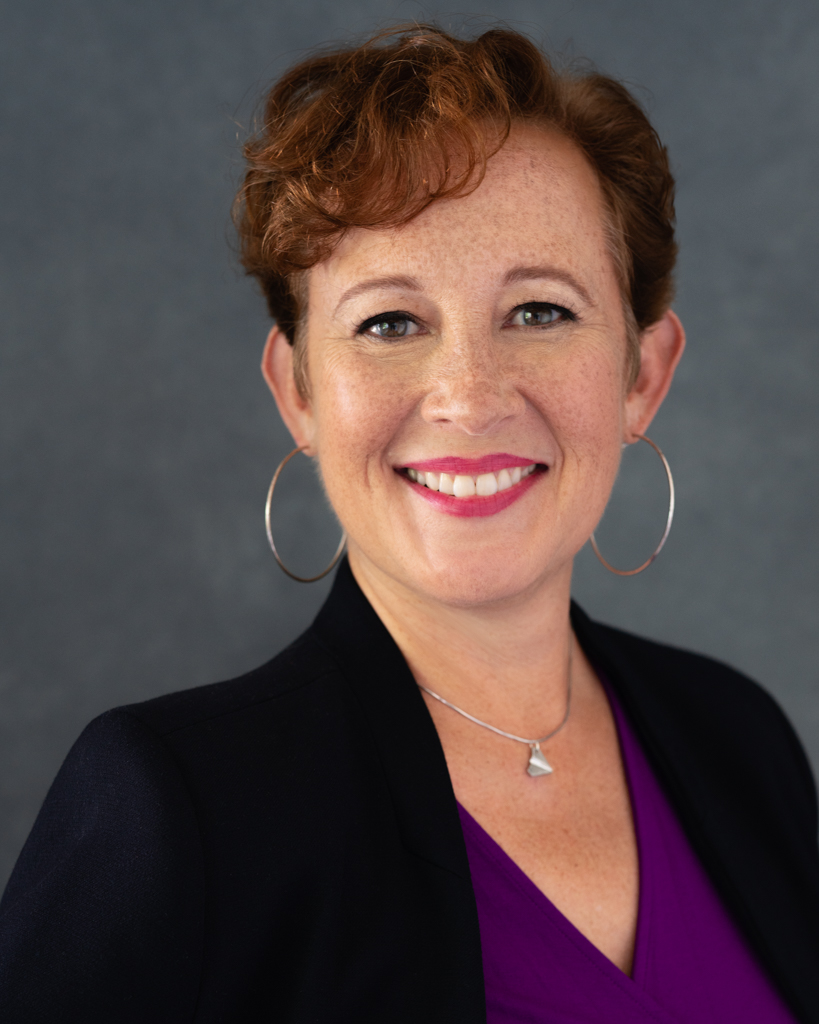
- Occupation: Film producer
- Years active: 2000-present
- Spouse: Mack Reed
- Children: 2

Kristina Reed is an American film producer, primarily of animated films, produced through DreamWorks Animation and Walt Disney Animation Studios. She has won the Academy Award for Best Animated Short Film for the 2014 short film Feast.

== Early life and education ==
Reed graduated from Polytechnic School in Pasadena, California. She earned a bachelor's degree with honors in Creative Writing from Brown University. She is married to Mack Reed and has 2 children.

== Career ==
Reed is known for her work on Paperman (2012), and Feast (2014), both were produced by Walt Disney Animation Studios. Paperman premiered in front of Wreck-It Ralph. When Paperman won the Academy Award for best animated short film in 2013, Reed gained immediate notoriety for throwing paper planes at the Oscars ceremony and being removed by security.

Feast premiered in front of Big Hero 6 (on which Reed was co-producer) in theaters. She served on the Walt Disney Animation Studios Leadership Team as head of Production, head of Development, then producer/co-producer for these Oscar-winning animated films.

After leaving Disney, Reed went on to work for The Madison Square Garden Company, as the VP, Strategy and Creative Development of the Sphere.

== Filmography ==
- Zootopia (2016) - studio leadership (feature film)
- Big Hero 6 (2014) - co-producer (feature film)
- Feast (2014) - producer (short film)
- Frozen (2013) - studio leadership (feature film)
- Paperman (2012) - producer (short film)
- Tangled Ever After (2012) - studio leadership (short film)
- Tangled (2010) - studio leadership (feature film)
- The Princess and the Frog (2009) - studio leadership (feature film)
- Kung Fu Panda (2008) - associate producer (feature film)
- Shrek the Third (2007) - production executive (feature film)
- Flushed Away (2006) - production executive (feature film)
- Over the Hedge (2006) - production executive (feature film)
- Madagascar (2005) - production executive (feature film)
- Shark Tale (2004) - production executive (feature film)
- Peter Pan (2003) - visual effects producer (feature film)
