= Silly Philly =

American comic strip by Bil Keane

- Author(s): Bil Keane
- Current status/schedule: Concluded Sunday strip
- Launch date: April 27, 1947
- End date: September 3, 1961
- Publisher(s): Philadelphia Bulletin
- Genre(s): Humor, Philadelphia
- Followed by: The Family Circus

Silly Philly was the first comic strip by Bil Keane, most noted for the long-running comic The Family Circus. Silly Philly ran from April 27, 1947, to September 3, 1961.

In 1947, Keane created the Sunday strip while working for the Philadelphia Bulletin. The main character was a goofy, juvenile William Penn, who had somehow jumped down from his 37' statue on the tower of City Hall in Philadelphia and become something of a scamp. The cartoon often featured jokes submitted by readers.

The Sunday strip sometimes included Mirthquakers, a puzzle and joke feature.

Keane, a native Philadelphian, has occasionally brought the city into reminiscences in Family Circus, which began in 1960.
