= Thelma Keane =

Australian-born American businesswoman (1926–2008)

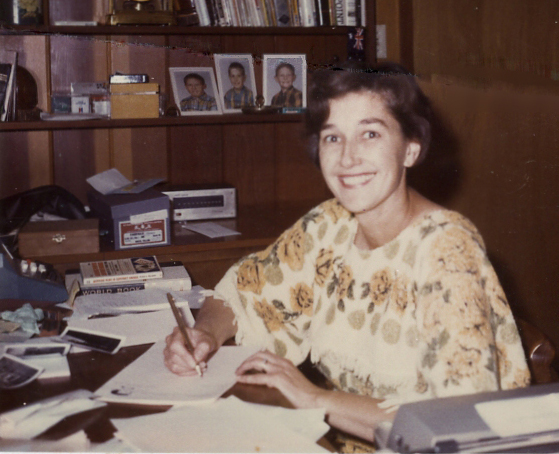
- Thelma Keane at her office desk in 1967
- Born: Thelma Carne; March 15, 1926; Gympie, Queensland, Australia
- Died: May 23, 2008 (aged 82); Paradise Valley, Arizona, U.S.
- Occupations: Businessperson and business manager
- Spouse: Bil Keane (m. 1948)
- Children: 5, including Glen and Jeff
- Relatives: Claire Keane (granddaughter)

Thelma "Thel" Keane (née Carne; March 15, 1926 – May 23, 2008) was the Australian-born American wife of The Family Circus newspaper cartoonist, Bil Keane. Keane served as her husband's inspiration and model for the "Mommy" character in his long-running comic strip and was instrumental in restoring the copyrights for The Family Circus to her husband.

== Early life ==
Keane was born Thelma Carne in Gympie, Queensland, Australia, in 1926. Her father was a banana farmer. For much of her early childhood, Carne lived in a four-room canvas tent within the borders of the Amamoor Forest Reserve while her father worked on a local reforestation project. She lived with relatives in Gympie while in high school and returned home to her family on the weekends.

== Personal life ==
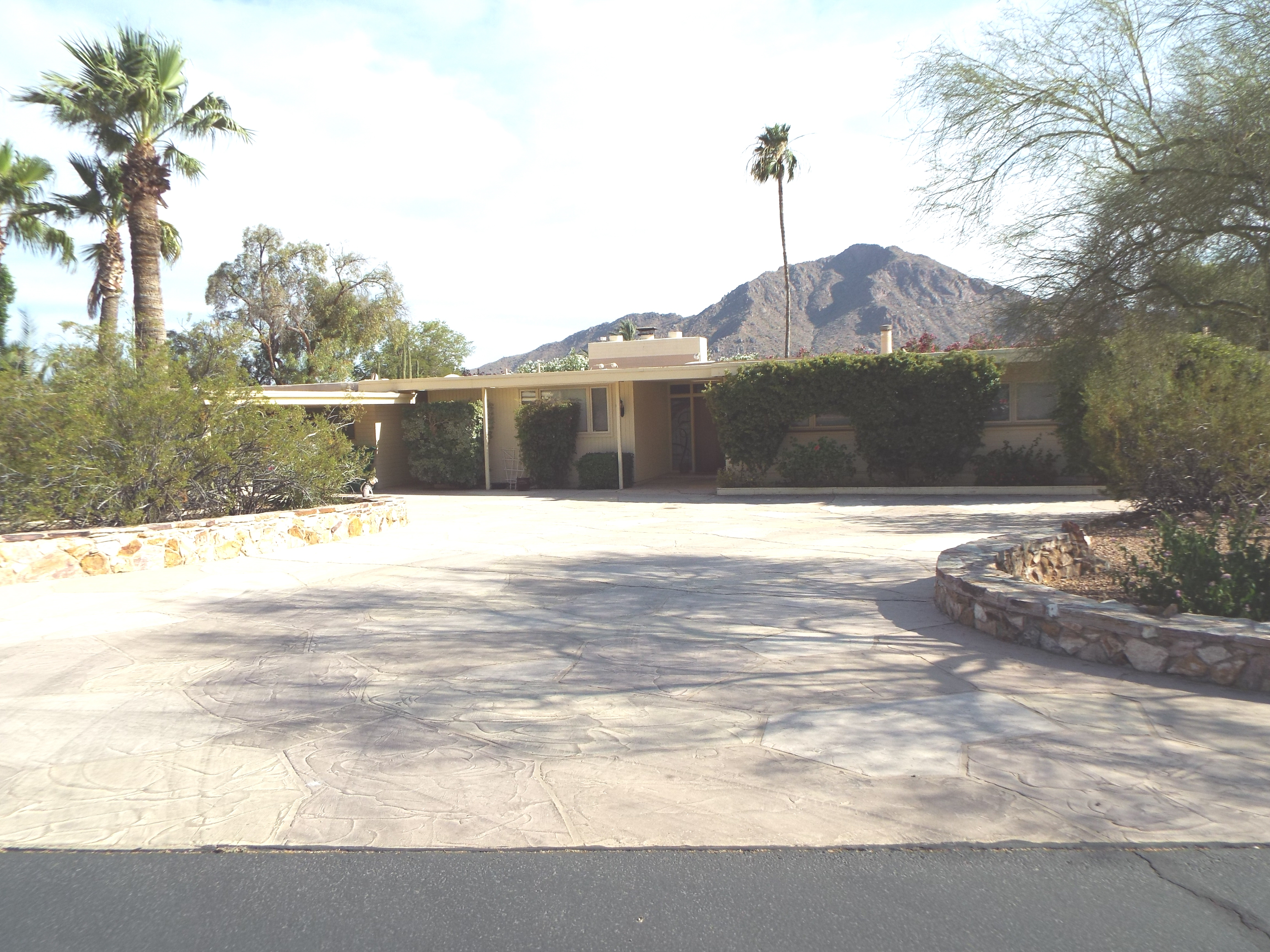
The Bil and Thelma Keane house located at 5815 E. Joshua Tree Ln. in Paradise Valley

Thelma Carne met her future husband, Bil Keane, an American, while working in the United States war bonds office in Brisbane, Australia, during World War II. Bil Keane was a United States Army promotional artist who drew posters and flyers for the war effort. Thelma had been hired as an accounting secretary for the office. Their desks and workstations were next to each other. Cartoonist Bil Keane later spoke of meeting Thelma in the office saying, "Thel was a very pretty 18-year-old with a gorgeous figure, long brown hair and I just happened to have a desk drawing next to her and I got the nerve to ask her out. We started laughing then and never stopped."

Thelma and Bil were married in 1948. She moved from Australia to her husband's hometown of Philadelphia, Pennsylvania, and eventually settled in the suburb of Roslyn, Pennsylvania. The couple had five children between 1949 and 1958. Thelma, her husband and their children moved to Paradise Valley, Arizona, in 1959. They owned a second residence in Laguna Beach, California. The family was Catholic.

== The Family Circus ==
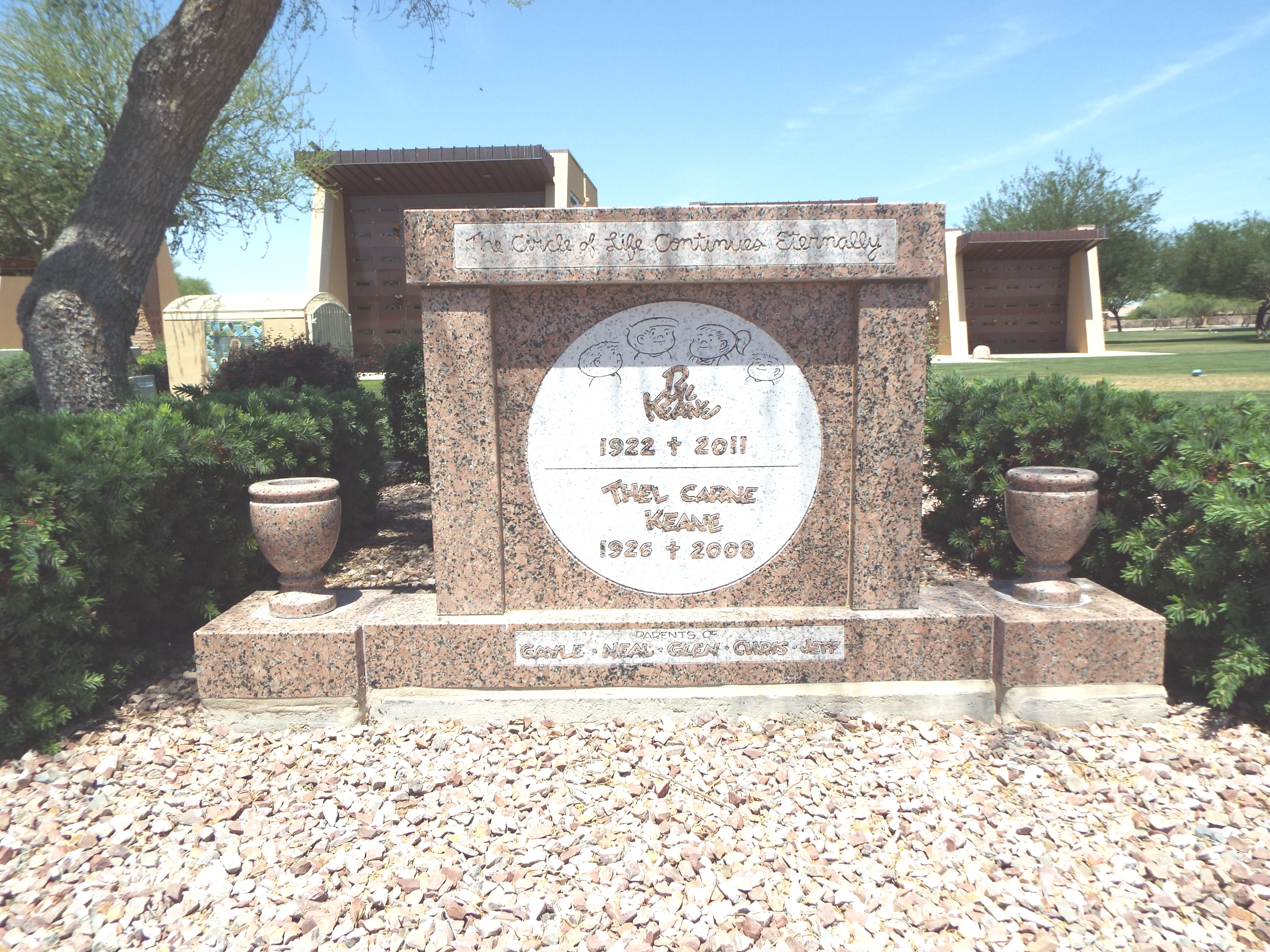
The grave of Bil and Thel Keane in the Holy Redeemer Cemetery in Phoenix, Arizona

Bil Keane began drawing The Family Circus comic strip in 1960. He modeled the Mommy in the cartoon on his wife, Thelma. The Mommy character in the comic was even named "Thel" after his wife's nickname. Bil Keane later told the Associated Press after Thelma's death in 2008, "She was the inspiration for all of my success. When the cartoon first appeared, she looked so much like Mommy that if she was in the supermarket pushing her cart around, people would come up to her and say, 'Aren't you the Mommy in 'Family Circus?' And she would admit it." Keane later altered the "Mommy" character's hair in 1996 because the style had become outdated.

Thelma Keane worked as the full-time financial and business manager for her husband while he continued to draw The Family Circus. Her family credited Thelma's business skills as the main reason that Bil Keane became one of the first syndicated newspaper cartoonists in the country to regain the full rights to his comic. She led the 1988 negotiations with King Features Syndicate to return the copyrights for The Family Circus. King Features finally agreed to return the rights to the cartoon to Bil Keane after long and protracted talks with Thelma Keane. As of 2008, the comic strip runs in approximately 1,500 newspapers.

== Death ==
Thelma Keane died at the age of 82 at the Barton House assisted living facility in Paradise Valley, Arizona, on May 23, 2008. She had been diagnosed with Alzheimer's disease. Keane was survived by her husband, Bil Keane, and the couple's five children, Gayle, Neal, Glen, Jeff and Christopher.

Her youngest son, Jeff Keane, continued to help his father draw and publish The Family Circus as an assistant inker and colorist. He took the full-time role of being the lead cartoonist after Bil Keane died in 2011.
