= Trash Truck (TV series) =

American animated television series

- Season 1 promotional poster
- Created by: Max Keane
- Written by: Max Keane
- Voices of: Henry Keane; Glen Keane
- Theme music composer: Pollen Music Group
- Opening theme: "Trash Truck" Theme
- Composers: Stephen Spies, Scot Stafford
- Country of origin: United States
- Original language: English
- No. of seasons: 2
- No. of episodes: 28 + special

Production
- Executive producers: Max Keane; Glen Keane; Gennie Rim
- Animator: Chromosphere Studio
- Editor: Sally Bergom
- Running time: 10-17 minutes
- Production companies: Glen Keane Productions; Netflix Animation Studios

Original release
- Network: Netflix
- Release: November 10, 2020 – present

Trash Truck is an American animated television series created and written by Max Keane. Each episode revolves around the adventures of a young boy named Hank and his best friend Trash Truck, who is a garbage truck.

Co-produced by Glen Keane Productions and Netflix Animation Studios, the series premiered on November 10, 2020 on Netflix. A second season premiered on May 4, 2021. A Christmas-themed special, titled A Trash Truck Christmas, was released on December 11, 2020. In April 2026, a third season was announced.

== Voice cast ==
- Henry Keane as Hank
- Glen Keane as Trash Truck and Grandpa Mel
- Olive Keane as Olive, Hank’s sister
- Max Keane as Dad
- Megan Paul as Mom
- Lucas Neff as Donny, a raccoon
- Brian Baumgartner as Walter, a bear
- Jackie Loeb as Ms. Mona, a mouse

== Series overview ==
Season	Episodes	Originally released
1	12	November 10, 2020
Christmas Special		December 11, 2020
2	16	May 4, 2021

== Episodes ==
=== Season 1 (2020) ===
No. overall	No. in season	Title	Directed by	Written by	Original release date
1	1	"Four Wheels & Flies"	Unknown	Unknown	November 10, 2020
2	2	"Slumber Party"	Unknown	Unknown	November 10, 2020
3	3	"Movie Theater"	Unknown	Unknown	November 10, 2020
4	4	"Olive Surfs"	Unknown	Unknown	November 10, 2020
5	5	"Hide and Seek"	Unknown	Unknown	November 10, 2020
6	6	"New Shoes"	Unknown	Unknown	November 10, 2020
7	7	"Hibernation Day"	Unknown	Unknown	November 10, 2020
8	8	"Highbeam"	Unknown	Unknown	November 10, 2020
9	9	"Sick Day"	Unknown	Unknown	November 10, 2020
10	10	"Trashimal"	Unknown	Unknown	November 10, 2020
11	11	"Training Wheels"	Unknown	Unknown	November 10, 2020
12	12	"Garbage Band"	Unknown	Unknown	November 10, 2020

=== Christmas Special (2020) ===
No. overall	No. in season	Title	Directed by	Written by	Original release date
13	1	"A Trash Truck Christmas"	Eddie Rosas and John Kahrs	Max Keane, Angie Sun, and Todd Casey	December 11, 2020

=== Season 2 (2021) ===
No. overall	No. in season	Title	Directed by	Written by	Original release date
14	1	"Share Day"	Unknown	Unknown	May 4, 2021
15	2	"Ballet Recital"	Unknown	Unknown	May 4, 2021
16	3	"Trash Truck and the Toad"	Unknown	Unknown	May 4, 2021
17	4	"Lost Voice"	Unknown	Unknown	May 4, 2021
18	5	"Dino Land"	Unknown	Unknown	May 4, 2021
19	6	"Balloon Day"	Unknown	Unknown	May 4, 2021
20	7	"Beach Day"	Unknown	Unknown	May 4, 2021
21	8	"Honk-ups"	Unknown	Unknown	May 4, 2021
22	9	"Pranks"	Unknown	Unknown	May 4, 2021
23	10	"Freeze Tag"	Unknown	Unknown	May 4, 2021
24	11	"The Dandelion"	Unknown	Unknown	May 4, 2021
25	12	"Fishing Trip"	Unknown	Unknown	May 4, 2021
26	13	"Kung Shoo"	Unknown	Unknown	May 4, 2021
27	14	"The Missing Bin"	Unknown	Unknown	May 4, 2021
28	15	"Bin Day"	Unknown	Unknown	May 4, 2021
29	16	"Mint Choco Boom"	Unknown	Unknown	May 4, 2021

== Production ==
The series was first announced in 2018.

The concept was inspired by Keane's son Henry's fascination with garbage trucks; Keane first developed it as a bedtime story about a boy whose best friend was a trash truck. Glen Keane, Gennie Rim, and Angie Sun later helped develop the idea into a preschool series. Keane chose computer animation to give the vehicle a tactile, grounded quality while retaining flexibility for a television production schedule.

Production began in March 2018. Dwarf Animation in France produced the computer animation, while Chromosphere handled production design.

== Release ==
Trash Truck debuted on Netflix on November 10, 2020. A trailer was released on October 20, 2020. The series was followed by a Christmas special on December 11. The 16-episode second season was released on May 4, 2021. Netflix renewed the series for a third season in April 2026, ordering 28 episodes and a Halloween special. Angie Sun joined Keane as showrunner for the season.

== Reception ==
Common Sense Media reviewer Ashley Moulton described Trash Truck as a slow-paced, "gentle" buddy series, praising its imaginative premise, emphasis on kindness and creative problem-solving, and portrayal of a sensitive boy protagonist.

== Accolades ==
At the 2021 Daytime Emmy Awards, the series was nominated for Outstanding Preschool Children's Animated Series and Outstanding Writing Team for a Preschool Animated Program. It was also nominated at the 48th Annie Awards for production design.

At the 2022 Kidscreen Awards, Trash Truck won Best New Series, Best Animated Series, and Best in Class, while A Trash Truck Christmas won Best Holiday or Special Episode. Later that year, editor Sally Bergom won the Children's and Family Emmy Award for Outstanding Editing for a Preschool Animated Program.
