= Jeff Keane =

American cartoonist

- Education: University of Southern California
- Known for: Family Circus
- Parents: Bil Keane (father); Thelma Keane (mother)
- Relatives: Glen Keane (brother)

Jeff Keane is an American cartoonist. He is the youngest son of cartoonist Bil Keane and who, following his father's death in 2011, became inker and colorist of the syndicated comic strip The Family Circus, after having assisted on it since 1981.

The character Jeffy from The Family Circus was based on the young Jeff Keane, who grew to receive his BFA in Drama at the University of Southern California, but eventually joined the family business. He lives in Laguna Hills, California, in the Nellie Gail Ranch community.

Keane was elected president of The National Cartoonists Society (NCS) for the 2007–2009 term. He was re-elected president for the 2009–2011 term.

At the 2015 Reuben Awards, Keane received the Silver T-Square Award for "outstanding service" to the cartooning profession.
