= Duet (2014 film) =

2014 animated film by Glen Keane

Duet is a 2014 animated short film created by former Disney animator Glen Keane. The project was done in conjunction with Google's Advanced Technology and Projects Group (ATAP) as part of Google's Spotlight Stories.

== Synopsis ==
A celebration of life through the hand-drawn line, this film is about Mia and Tosh, two people growing up together to create an inspired duet.

== Critical reception ==
The film garnered an Annie Award nomination for Best Animated Short Subject and was shortlisted for an Oscar in the same category.
