= Glen Keane =

American writer and artist

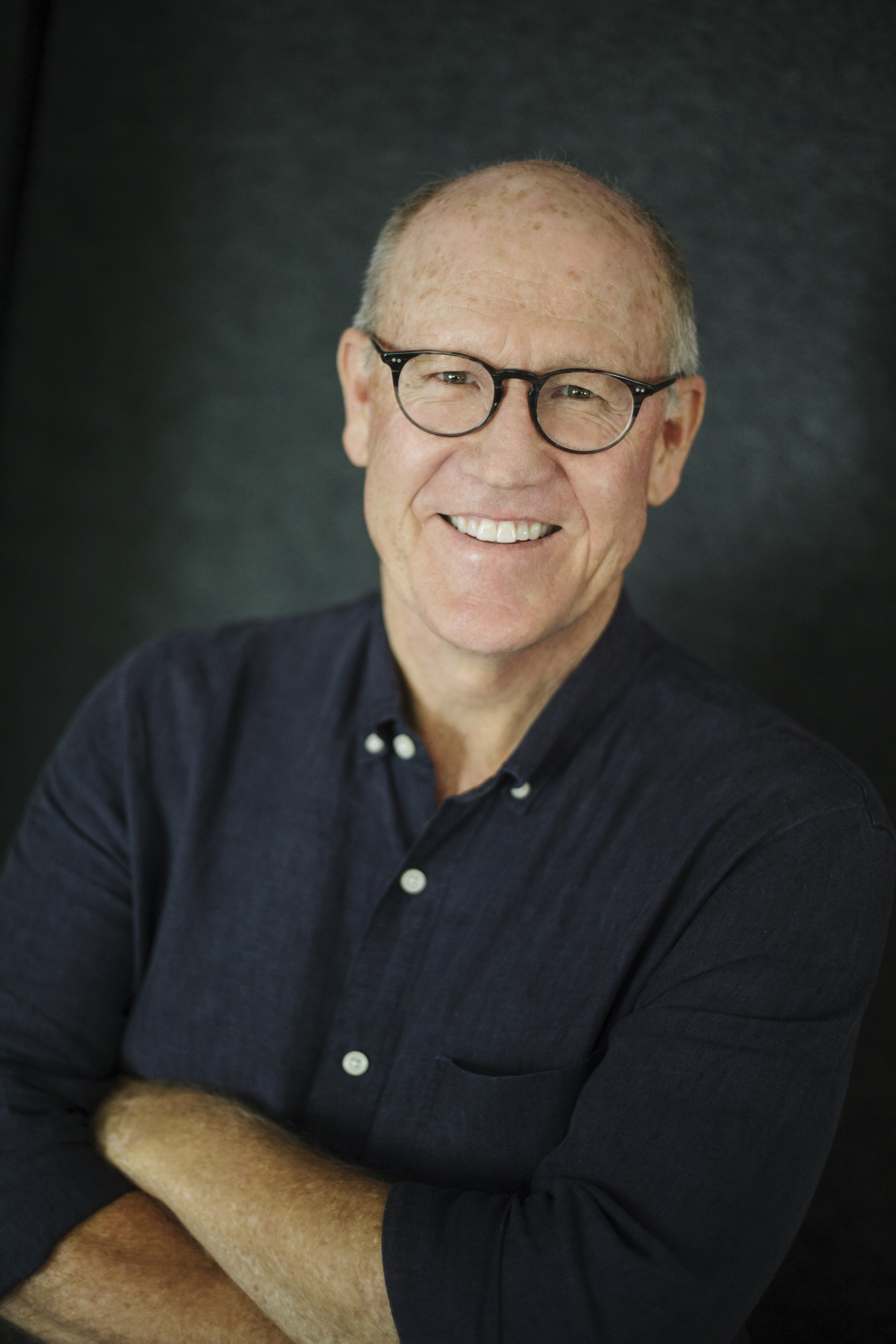
- Keane in 2017
- Born: 1954 (age 71–72); Philadelphia, Pennsylvania, U.S.
- Occupations: Animator; author; illustrator; cartoonist
- Years active: 1973–present
- Employer(s): Filmation (1973); Walt Disney Animation Studios (1974–2012)
- Spouse: Linda Hesselroth (m. 1975)
- Children: Claire Keane; Max Keane
- Parents: Bil Keane (father); Thelma Keane (mother)
- Relatives: Jeff Keane (brother)
- Awards: Academy Award for Best Animated Short Film; Dear Basketball (2017)

Glen Keane is an American animator, director, author, and illustrator. As a character animator at Walt Disney Animation Studios for 38 years (1974–2012), he worked on feature films including The Little Mermaid, Beauty and the Beast, Aladdin, Pocahontas, Tarzan, and Tangled. He received the 1992 Annie Award for character animation and the 2007 Winsor McCay Award for lifetime contribution to the field of animation. He was named a Disney Legend in 2013, a year after retiring from the studio.

In 2017, Keane directed Dear Basketball, an animated short film based on Kobe Bryant's retirement poem in The Players' Tribune, for which Keane and Bryant received the Academy Award for Best Animated Short Film at the 90th Academy Awards.

== Early life ==
Keane was born in Philadelphia in 1954, the son of cartoonist Bil Keane, creator of The Family Circus, and Australian-born Thelma Keane (née Carne). He grew up in Paradise Valley, Arizona next to Scottsdale, as a Catholic.

Keane's interest in art developed from observing his father's work as a cartoonist. (Keane's father based his Family Circus character of Billy on Glen's younger self.) To encourage Glen to draw, his father gave him a copy of Burne Hogarth's Dynamic Anatomy, and recommended he observe body forms and practice creative approaches to life drawing.

After graduating from high school at Brophy College Preparatory in Phoenix in 1972, Keane applied to the California Institute of the Arts School of Art in Santa Clarita, southwest of Palmdale, rather than accepting a football scholarship to another college. His application was accidentally sent to the Program in Experimental Animation (then called Film Graphics), where he was mentored by Jules Engel.

== Career ==
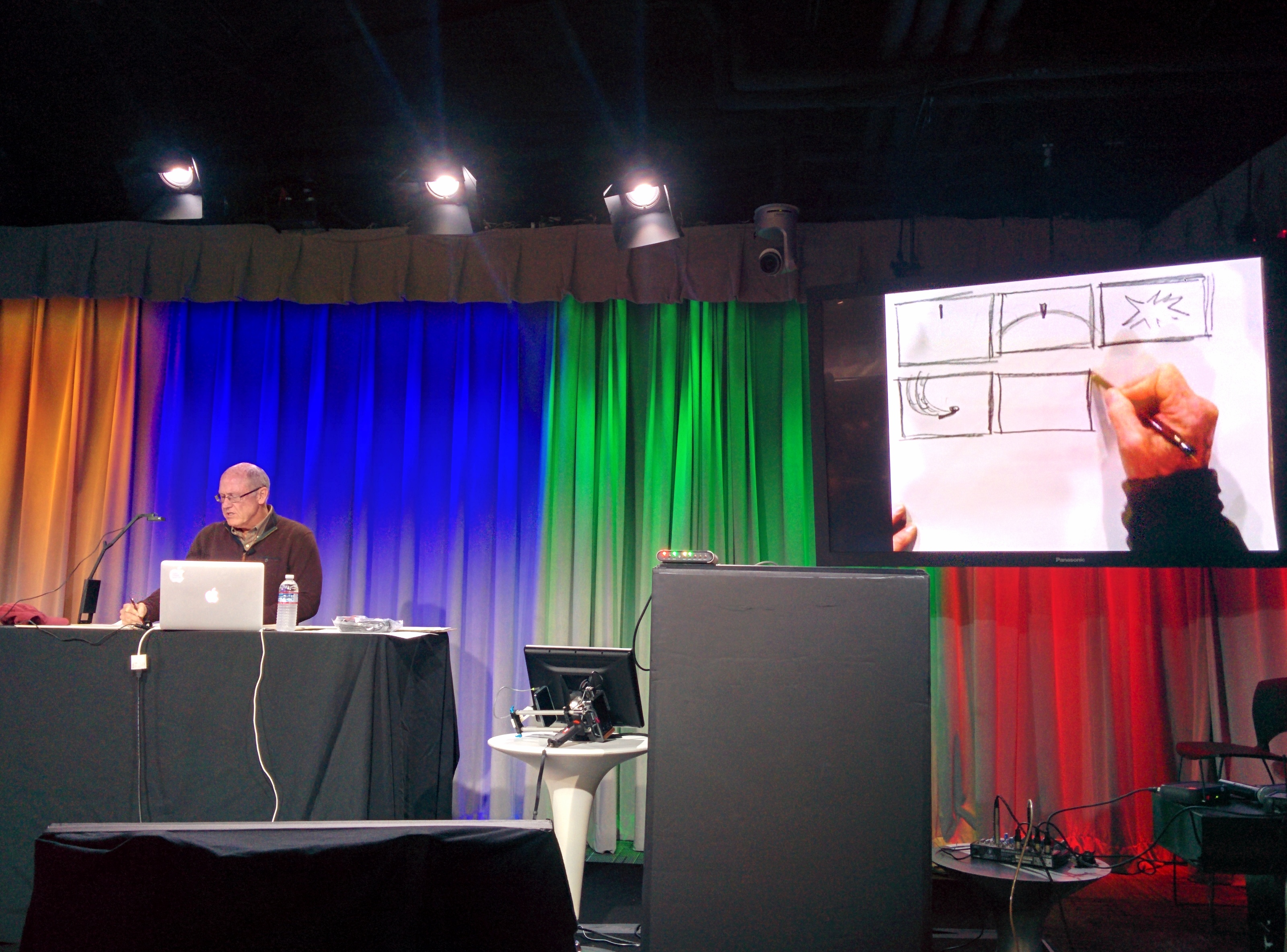
Glen Keane demonstrating storyboarding, June 2015

Keane left CalArts in 1974 and joined Disney the same year, where he spent three years working with veteran animator Ollie Johnston on the characters Bernard and Penny in The Rescuers. He then animated Elliott the Dragon in Pete's Dragon, and the climactic bear showdown in The Fox and the Hound.

In 1982, inspired by the groundbreaking film Tron, Keane collaborated with animator John Lasseter (Toy Story, Toy Story 2) on a 30-second test scene of Maurice Sendak's Where the Wild Things Are, which was optioned for them by Disney executive Tom Wilhite. The test integrated traditional character animation and computer-generated backgrounds (Video on YouTube), and, like Tron, was a collaboration with MAGI. It was Disney's first experiment with digitally-drawn characters. Although the project was revolutionary (and became a predecessor to the famous ballroom scene in Beauty and the Beast), Disney declined to invest further in the featurette due to its cost.

In 1983, Keane left contract employment with Disney and worked as a freelance artist. He animated the character Professor Ratigan in Disney's The Great Mouse Detective; the "Boys and Girls of Rock n' Roll" and "Getting Lucky" in The Chipmunk Adventure; and the characters Fagin, Sykes, Jenny Foxworth, and Georgette in Oliver & Company.

He became a lead character animator, one of the group of young animators mentored by "Disney's Nine Old Men". Keane animated some of Disney's most memorable characters in The Disney Renaissance. He designed and animated the character of Ariel in the film The Little Mermaid (1989), and the eagle Marahute in The Rescuers Down Under. He was supervising animator for the title characters of the three Disney hit features Beauty and the Beast, Aladdin, and Pocahontas. While living with his family in Paris for three years, Keane completed work on Disney's 1999 Tarzan, for which he drew the eponymous character. He returned to Disney's studio in Burbank, California as the lead animator for John Silver in Treasure Planet.

In 2003, he began work as the director of Disney's animated film Tangled (based on the Brothers Grimm story Rapunzel), released in November 2010, where Keane and his team strove to bring the style and warmth of traditional animation to computer animation. In October 2008, due to "non-life-threatening health issues", Keane stepped back as director of Tangled, but remained the film's executive producer and an animating director.

On March 23, 2012, Keane left Walt Disney Animation Studios after 37 years there. In a letter to his coworkers, he said, "I owe so much to those great animators who mentored me–Eric Larson, Frank Thomas, and Ollie Johnston –as well as to the many other wonderful people at Disney whom I have been fortunate to work with in the past nearly 38 years. I am convinced that animation really is the ultimate form of our time with endless new territories to explore. I can’t resist its siren call to step out and discover them." He later said that one of the reasons he left Disney was his experience during the production of Tangled, which underwent several storyline and title changes. He felt that in a big studio like Disney, there were too many conflicting interests, with management pulling people "in too many different directions".

In December 2013, it was announced that Keane joined Motorola's Advanced Technology and Projects Group to help its engineers create interactive hand-drawn animation. He released his first animated short, Duet, at the Google I/O Conference in San Francisco on June 25, 2014. It is the first hand-drawn cartoon made at 60 frames per second, and the third in a series of shorts, called the Spotlight Stories, designed to explore spatial awareness and the sensory inputs of a mobile device to create distinctive storytelling experiences. When Google sold its Motorola subsidiary in early 2014, Keane and his group remained there.

In 2015, it was revealed that Keane and 16 other prominent artists and filmmakers had been hired by the Paris Opera to work on their 3rd Stage project. Keane is the creator of the animated short Nephtali (a reference to Jacob's blessings and Psalm 42), on which he collaborated with choreographer and ballet dancer Marion Barbeau.

In addition to his work as an animator, Keane has written and illustrated a series of children's books based on Bible parables, featuring the characters Adam Raccoon and King Aren the Lion. Keane directed the Chinese animated film Over the Moon, about a girl who builds a rocket and flies to the moon to meet a legendary moon goddess. Written by Audrey Wells, produced by Pearl Studio, and animated by Sony Pictures Imageworks, it was released on Netflix on October 23, 2020.

At the 2018 Academy Awards, Keane shared the Academy Award for Best Animated Short Film with Kobe Bryant for Dear Basketball, which was based on a poem Bryant wrote on his retirement. On May 26, 2018 Keane received the 2017 Reuben Award for the Cartoonist of the Year in his hometown of Philadelphia.

== Personal life ==
In 1975, during the production of his debut film, Keane married Linda Hesselroth. They are the parents of author and illustrator Claire Keane and animator Max Keane.

Keane has been cited as an artist with aphantasia, a condition characterized by an inability to form mental images. He is a Christian.

His father Bil Keane died in 2011 and his mother Thelma Keane died in 2008. He currently lives in France. In October 2026, the 72-year-old had to be rescued by helicopter after feeling ill during a hike with his grandchildren in Paradise Valley, Arizona, where he grew up.

== Filmography ==
Year	Title	Credits	Characters	Notes
1973	My Favorite Martians	Layout Artist		TV series by Filmation
1973	Star Trek: The Animated Series	Layout Artist		TV series by Filmation
1973	Lassie's Rescue Rangers	Layout Artist		TV series by Filmation
1973	Mission: Magic!	Layout Artist		TV series by Filmation
1977	The Rescuers	Character Animator	Bernard, Miss Bianca and Penny	
1977	Pete's Dragon	Character Animator	Elliott the Dragon	
1979	A Family Circus Christmas (TV Movie short)	Animator / Models		
1981	The Fox and the Hound	Supervising Animator	The Bear, Vixey, Tod, Copper, The Badger, The Porcupine, and Tod's Mother	
1983	Mickey's Christmas Carol (Short)	Animator		
1986	The Great Mouse Detective	Supervising Animator	Professor Ratigan	
1987	The Chipmunk Adventure	Animator / Storyboard Artist		
1988	Oliver & Company	Character Designer / Supervising Animator	Sykes, Georgette, Fagin and Jenny Foxworth	
1989	The Little Mermaid	Character Designer / Supervising Animator	Ariel	
1990	The Rescuers Down Under	Storyboard Artist / Supervising Animator / Character Designer / Visual Development Artist	Marahute	
1991	Beauty and the Beast	Supervising Animator	Beast	
1992	Aladdin	Supervising Animator	Aladdin	
1995	Pocahontas	Story / Supervising Animator / Visual Development Artist / Character Designer	Pocahontas	
1999	Tarzan	Story / Supervising Animator	Tarzan	
2002	Treasure Planet	Supervising Animator	Captain Long John Silver	
2003	Mickey's PhilharMagic (Short)	Animator	Ariel	
2008	Bolt	Special Thanks		
2010	Tangled	Executive Producer / Animation Supervisor / Character Designer / Supervising Animator	Rapunzel	
2011	Adam and Dog (Short)	Film Consultant		
2012	Paperman (Short)	Character Designer	Meg	
2012	Wreck-It Ralph	Additional Visual Development Artist		
2014	Duet (Short)	Director / Animator		
2016	Invasion! (Short)	Special Thanks		
2017	Dear Basketball (Short)	Director / Animator		Academy Award for Best Animated Short Film
2020	Over the Moon	Director / Executive Producer / Character Designer / Story Artist / Animator ("On The Moon Above" song sequence) / Voice Actor (Space Dog and Rail Worker #3)		Feature directorial debut
2020-present	Trash Truck	Executive Producer / Voice Actor	Trash Truck and Grandpa Mel	TV series
In production	Joy (short)	Director / Animator		Life passion project

== Publications ==
- Keane, Glen (1986). Adam Raccoon and the King's Big Dinner. Colorado Springs, Col.: Chariot Victor Pub. ISBN 978-0-7814-0039-8. OCLC 49002064.
- Keane, Glen (1987). Adam Raccoon at Forever Falls. Elgin, Ill.: Chariot Books. ISBN 978-1-55513-087-9. OCLC 14588033.
- Keane, Glen (1987). Adam Raccoon in Lost Woods. Elgin, Ill.: Chariot Books. ISBN 978-1-55513-088-6. OCLC 14905950.
- Keane, Glen (1987). Adam Raccoon and the Circus Master. Elgin, Ill.: Chariot Books. ISBN 978-1-55513-090-9. OCLC 14931727.
- Keane, Glen (1989). Adam Raccoon and the Flying Machine. Elgin, Ill.: Chariot Books. ISBN 978-1-55513-287-3. OCLC 18050595.
- Keane, Glen (1989). Adam Raccoon and the Mighty Giant. Elgin, Ill.: Chariot Books. ISBN 978-1-55513-288-0. OCLC 19397210.
- Campbell, Stan; Vogel, Jane; Duckworth, John; Townsend, Jim; Glen Keane (ill.) (1992). Quick studies: Philippians–Hebrews. Elgin, Ill.: D.C. Cook Pub. Co. ISBN 978-0-7814-0028-2. OCLC 28687078.
- Campbell, Stan; Duckworth, John; Townsend, Jim; Glen Keane (ill.) (1992). Quick Studies: James–Revelation. Elgin, Ill.: D.C. Cook Pub. Co. ISBN 978-0-7814-0029-9. OCLC 28687002.
- Keane, Glen (1993). Adam Raccoon and the Race to Victory Mountain. Elgin, Ill.: Chariot Books. ISBN 978-1-55513-363-4. OCLC 25367425.
- Keane, Glen (1995). Adam Raccoon and Bully Garumph. Elgin, Ill.: Chariot Books. ISBN 978-1-55513-367-2. OCLC 32745892.
- Keane, Glen (1995). Cookie time: a first lesson in obedience. Elgin, Ill.: Chariot Books. ISBN 978-0-7814-0206-4. OCLC 37453329.
- Keane, Glen (1995). Follow the king: A first lesson in trust. Elgin, Ill.: Chariot Books. ISBN 978-0-7814-0207-1. OCLC 37453329.
- Keane, Glen; Taylor, Samii; Yakovetic, Joe (1995). Parables for Little Kids. Elgin, Ill.: Chariot Family Pub. ISBN 978-0-7814-0258-3. OCLC 33440835.
- Keane, Glen (2016). The Adventures of Adam Raccoon: Forever Falls. Irvine, CA: Green Egg Media. ISBN 978-1-93721-219-3.
- Keane, Glen (2016). The Adventures of Adam Raccoon: Lost Woods. Irvine, CA.: Green Egg Media. ISBN 978-1-93721-221-6.
- Keane, Glen (2016). The Adventures of Adam Raccoon: The Circus Master. Irvine, CA: Green Egg Media. ISBN 978-1-93721-217-9.
- Keane, Glen (2016). The Adventures of Adam Raccoon: The Flying Machine. Irvine, CA: Green Egg Media. ISBN 978-1-93721-218-6.
- Keane, Glen (2016). The Adventures of Adam Raccoon: The Mighty Giant. Irvine, CA: Green Egg Media. ISBN 978-1-93721-222-3.
- Keane, Glen (2016). The Adventures of Adam Raccoon: The King's Big Dinner. Irvine, CA: Green Egg Media. ISBN 978-1-93721-220-9.
- Keane, Glen (2016). The Adventures of Adam Raccoon: Race to Victory Mountain. Irvine, CA: Green Egg Media. ISBN 978-1-93721-223-0.
- Keane, Glen (2016). The Adventures of Adam Raccoon: Bully Garumph. Irvine, CA: Green Egg Media. ISBN 978-1-93721-216-2.
