= Paperman =

- Promotional poster by Jeff Turley
- Directed by: John Kahrs
- Story by: Clio Chiang; Kendelle Hoyer
- Produced by: Kristina Reed
- Starring: Phil Johnston; Kari Wahlgren
- Edited by: Lisa Linder Sliver
- Music by: Christophe Beck
- Animation by: Patrick Osborne (animation supervisor)
- Color process: Black-and-white; Color
- Production company: Walt Disney Animation Studios
- Distributed by: Walt Disney Studios; Motion Pictures (Note: Distributed by Walt Disney Studios Motion Pictures through the Walt Disney Pictures banner.)
- Release date: November 2, 2012 (with Wreck-It Ralph)
- Running time: 6:33
- Country: United States
- Language: English

Paperman is an American black-and-white computer-cel animated romantic comedy short film produced by Walt Disney Animation Studios. Directed by John Kahrs, it blends traditional and computer animation, and features the voices of Phil Johnston and Kari Wahlgren in the leading roles.

The film was released on November 2, 2012 alongside Wreck-It Ralph. It earned positive reviews from critics and audiences, who particularly praised the animation and its storyline. At the 85th Academy Awards, it won Best Animated Short Film, the first short film produced by Disney to win an Academy Award since It's Tough to Be a Bird won at the 42nd Academy Awards in 1970. At the 40th Annie Awards, it won Best Animated Short Subject.

== Plot ==
A young accountant named George is standing on an elevated train platform in the 1940s in New York City, holding a folder, when he is hit by a flying piece of paper. The paper is chased by a young woman named Meg who lost it to a gust of wind from a passing train. The same thing happens to George when a subsequent gust of wind from another incoming train dislodges one of the papers from his folder and blows it into Meg's face, leaving a lipstick-smudged kiss imprinted on the paper, much to her amusement when George retrieves it. He is entranced by the lipstick mark and Meg's beauty, and therefore misses her boarding the departing train. The two exchange looks as she departs.

George arrives at work, despondent, gazing at the lipstick-marked paper on his desk. He looks out the window and is surprised to find Meg in the building across the street, working in an office with an open window. After failing to get her attention by waving his arms, much to the annoyance of his boss, George begins folding airplanes from a stack of papers on his desk, throwing them out the window one by one in an attempt to get her to notice him. His efforts are met with varying levels of failure, as well as disparaging looks from his boss. In desperation, having used all of the paper on his desk to no success, he uses the lipstick-marked paper, although this fails as well when a gust of wind tugs it from his hands. Meg then leaves the office, and George, rebuffing his boss, dashes from his desk. Rushing across a street of busy traffic, he fails to see which way she went, and only finds the final lipstick-marked paper airplane. Angered, he throws it hard and it soars into the sky.

It turns out many of the paper airplanes have collected in a nearby alley, and when the lipstick-marked paper airplane lands among them, they begin to stir and fly from the ground, seeming to come alive, and set off in pursuit of George. A cloud of paper airplanes forces him toward a nearby train station and onto a train, much to his confusion. Meanwhile, the lipstick-marked paper airplane sets off in pursuit of Meg, finding her at a flower stand. Recognizing the lipstick-marked paper, she chases the airplane to another train station and aboard a different train. They're finally brought together when both of their trains stop at the same station; George still covered in paper airplanes and Meg holding his lipstick-marked paper airplane. As the credits roll, they are seen chatting happily with each other at a restaurant table with the lipstick marked paper between them. The picture disappears but the paper still is in the credits before it flies off.

== Cast ==
- Phil Johnston as George
- Kari Wahlgren as Meg

== Production ==
=== Conception and writing ===
"Every morning on my way to work I would go through Grand Central Station ... and sometimes you'd meet eye to eye with people, just strangers, like a pretty girl or something, and you'd think is there a connection? You feel that connection for a split second and wonder who that person was. That's the core idea of it – what if two people were really perfect for each other, and they had that chance meeting? And what if they were separated – how would those two people get back together again? And how could a little bit of magic and fate intervene to bring them back together?"
— Director John Kahrs on his inspiration behind Paperman.

In an interview with Animation World Network, director John Kahrs revealed that Paperman first materialized when he was working as an animator at Blue Sky Studios during the 1990s. Kahrs conceived Paperman while he was traveling on his routine commute through Grand Central Station, where he was inspired by "the random connections you sometimes make with people" on these excursions. As a result, he created a story about "a guy who makes a connection with this girl on his long commute", elaborating that "the story really is about what happens when he tries to get her back and make that connection again". Describing Paperman as an "urban fairytale", Kahrs pitched the idea as an animated short to Disney Chief Creative Officer John Lasseter and Walt Disney Animation Studios several times. The studio refused to develop the project because they were pre-occupied with Tangled (2010), on which Kahrs also worked. It wasn't until after Tangled was completed that Disney, who was searching for a project that would "fill the space between" Tangled and Wreck-It Ralph, that Paperman was finally green-lit.

Kahrs developed the story on storyboards and wrote the original draft of Paperman. However, he admitted that the writing was really a collaborative process because he constantly received creative input from a "peer group of directors". Lasseter, who served as an executive producer on the film, also made frequent contributions. The main character, George, was inspired by George Bailey from the film It's A Wonderful Life (1946). According to Kahrs, Bailey, like George, "experiences the full gamut of life, from the highest highs to the lowest lows. He's a real guy; he gets frustrated. He's got dreams".

=== Animation ===
While searching for a "way to merge 2D and 3D" animation, Kahrs discovered Meander, "a hybrid vector/raster-based drawing and animation system that gives artists an interactive way to craft the film". When describing the inspiration for the film's unique style of animation, which was created with this new in-house technology, Kahrs stated: "We brought together as best we could the expressiveness of 2D drawing immersed with the stability and dimensionality of CG. It really goes back to working with Glen Keane on Tangled, watching him draw over all the images".

The technique, called "final line advection", gives the artists and animators significantly more influence and control over the final product as everything is done within the same department. In his commentary: "In Paperman, we didn't have a cloth department and we didn't have a hair department. Here, folds in the fabric, hair silhouettes and the like come from the committed design decision-making that comes with the 2D drawn process. Our animators can change things, actually erase away the CG underlayer if they want, and change the profile of the arm. And they can design all the fabric in that Milt Kahl kind-of way, if they want to".

=== Characters and voices ===
The character design of Paperman has been likened to that of Disney's traditionally animated film, One Hundred and One Dalmatians (1961). Several comparisons have been drawn between the characters George from Paperman and Roger from 101 Dalmatians, specifically the fact that they both share similar body types. George's appearance underwent several alterations, but Kahrs always intended for the character to have a rather large nose, saying that it "can still be really fun and attractive". Longtime Disney animator Glen Keane worked on George's love interest, Meg. According to Kahrs, both Paperman characters George and Meg were intentionally drawn to complement and match each other's designs.

In an interview with her school's alumni association, Kari Wahlgren, who voiced Meg, said that she was asked to do the role because of her previous involvements in Bolt and Tangled. Recording for her role in the film took about 30 minutes: "Since the film is mostly silent, they just wanted some vocal 'ambiance' that they could experiment with. We played with lots of different vocal reactions in the session: snorts, gasps, breaths... I think one chuckle made it into the final mix. I'm actually glad they kept it mostly silent—I think it makes the short even more powerful that way".

== Release ==
The short film premiered at the Annecy International Animated Film Festival in June 2012. The film was screened in August 2012 for attendees of D23 Destiination D: 75 Years of Disney Animation at the Disneyland Resort. Five months later, the short accompanied the theatrical release of Wreck-It Ralph, which was released on November 2. Christophe Beck's score was released digitally by Walt Disney Records in the following month on December 18. After being nominated for the Academy Award for Best Animated Short Film, Paperman was released along with the other Oscar-nominated shorts of its year in theaters by ShortsHD.

The short was also released on YouTube on January 29, 2013, but is currently private. It was later released on Hulu, but was eventually removed from the service. Paperman was available on Netflix in North America on October 25, 2015, released in the Walt Disney Animation Studios Short Films Collection, which also included Frozen Fever and Get a Horse!, as one film title on the service. The title was removed from the service on October 25, 2021, six years after it was added. The short film, and most of the others that were released on Netflix, were made available to stream individually, rather than one single collection, on Disney+ on November 12, 2021 for the first Disney+ Day.

Paperman was released by Walt Disney Studios Home Entertainment on the Blu-ray and DVD releases of Wreck-It Ralph on March 5, 2013. Paperman was also released on the Walt Disney Animation Studios Short Films Collection Blu-ray on August 18, 2015.

== Reception ==
Film critic Jeff Shannon, writing for RogerEbert.com, called the short "brilliant from start to finish" writing that the film proved "yet again that traditional 2-D animation is every bit as expressive as computer-generated 3-D". Leonard Maltin called the short an "amusing and ingenious love story" noting that it was "perfection itself".

There is some discussion regarding some similarities in the storyline and concept of Paperman and Patrick Hughes' 2008 short film, Signs. Hughes himself dismissed the idea of copying while acknowledging the similarities between them, but he admired the short and called it "beautiful".

Paperman was nominated and won both an Academy Award for Best Animated Short Film at the 85th Academy Awards and the Annie Award for Best Animated Short Subject at the 40th Annie Awards. It was the first Disney short to win an Oscar in that category since 1969.

== See also ==
- Wikisource:Stories by Foreign Authors (Scandinavian)/The Flying Mail – in this 1867 short story, Danish author Meïr Aron Goldschmidt explored a similar theme of wind-blown paper bringing two strangers together.
