= Bil Keane =

American cartoonist (1922–2011)

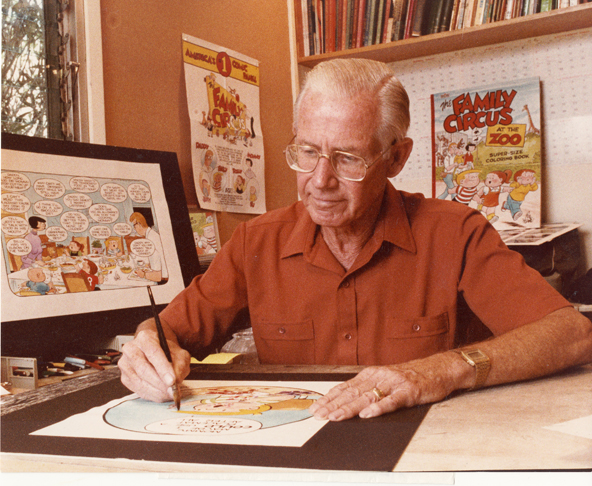
- Keane at work in his studio in 1990
- Born: William Aloysius Keane; October 5, 1922 Philadelphia, Pennsylvania, U.S.
- Died: November 8, 2011 (aged 89) Paradise Valley, Arizona, U.S.
- Area: Cartoonist
- Notable works: The Family Circus; Channel Chuckles
- Awards: full list
- Spouse: Thelma Keane (m. 1948; died 2008)
- Children: 5, including Glen and Jeff
- Relatives: Claire Keane (granddaughter)

William Aloysius Keane (October 5, 1922 – November 8, 2011) was an American cartoonist best known for the newspaper comic strip The Family Circus. He began it in 1960 and his son Jeff Keane continues to produce it.

== Early life and education ==
Keane was born in Crescentville, a neighborhood in Philadelphia, and attended parochial school at St. William Parish and Northeast Catholic High School. While a schoolboy, he taught himself to draw by mimicking the style of the cartoons published in The New Yorker. His first cartoon was published on May 21, 1936, on the amateur page of the Philadelphia Daily News. While in high school, he signed his work "Bill Keane", but omitted the second L from his first name early in his career, in order "to be distinctive".

== Career ==
Keane served in the U.S. Army from 1942 to 1945, during which he drew for Yank and created the feature "At Ease with the Japanese" for the Pacific edition of Stars and Stripes.

From 1946 to 1959, Keane worked as a staff artist for the Philadelphia Bulletin, where he launched his first regular comic strip Silly Philly. His first syndicated strip, Channel Chuckles, a series of jokes about television, premiered in 1954 and ran until 1977. In 1959, the Keane family moved to Paradise Valley, Arizona. Keane's daily newspaper panel The Family Circus premiered on February 29, 1960. He was president of the National Cartoonists Society from 1981 to 1983 and was the master of ceremonies at the Society's annual awards banquet for 16 years.

From 1981 to 1983, Keane published the gag strip Eggheads in collaboration with his son Jeff, who now draws and writes The Family Circus. Like his father, Jeff Keane has been president of the National Cartoonists Society, serving four years thereat.

== Personal life ==
While stationed in Australia, Keane met Thelma "Thel" Carne. They were married in Brisbane, Queensland, in 1948 and settled in Roslyn, Pennsylvania. They had five children: Gayle, Neal, Glen, Christopher and Jeff. Glen is an animator and has drawn much notice for his work for Walt Disney Animation Studios. Jeff is a cartoonist and took over his father's comic strip upon the latter's death. Thel, the inspiration for Mommy in The Family Circus, died on May 23, 2008, from complications of Alzheimer's disease.

Keane and his wife owned a second residence in Laguna Beach, California.

Bil Keane died on November 8, 2011, at his home in Paradise Valley, Arizona, near Phoenix, at age 89. The cause of death was given as congestive heart failure. A Catholic, he was buried beside his wife in the Holy Redeemer Cemetery of Phoenix, Arizona.

== Awards ==
Keane received the National Cartoonists Society's Award for Best Syndicated Panel four times, in 1967, 1971, 1973 and 1974. In 1981, he was awarded the Inkpot Award. In 1982, he was named the Society's Cartoonist of the Year and received the Reuben Award, the Society's top honor. That year he also received the Elzie Segar Award for his unique contribution to the cartooning profession.

In 1998, Keane became the tenth recipient of the Arizona Heritage Award, joining—among others—Barry Goldwater, Sandra Day O'Connor, Mo Udall and Erma Bombeck. In 2002, Keane was honored with the Silver T-Square Award from the National Cartoonist Society for "outstanding dedication" to the Society and the cartooning profession. In 2008, he received the Sergio Award from the Comic Art Professional Society.

== Friends ==
Keane was close friends with humorist and newspaper columnist Erma Bombeck. He provided illustrations for Bombeck's book Just Wait Until You Have Children of Your Own! (1972), and considered himself instrumental in convincing Bombeck and her family to move to Arizona near his home. He was a pallbearer at Bombeck's funeral in 1996.

Stephan Pastis, creator of Pearls Before Swine, acknowledged he was good friends with Keane and Keane's son, Jeff. Pastis has parodied The Family Circus in his own strip several times, and Keane wrote a satirical "attack" on these jokes as a foreword for Pastis' Pearls collection Macho Macho Animals.

In the comic strip switcheroo of 1997, Keane switched strips with Scott Adams of Dilbert. Adams said, "Bil was a misunderstood creative genius who knew how to write for his target audience. He was also a great guy. I was a big fan."

Keane also counted fellow cartoonists Charles M. Schulz (Peanuts) and Mell Lazarus (Miss Peach, Momma) as close friends.

In 1994, the characters from The Family Circus made a "guest appearance" in Bill Griffith's Zippy the Pinhead comic strip. Griffith said, "I remembered Bil's affection for Zippy, so I decided to bite the bullet and call him to ask if, instead of me parodying his strip, he'd agree to jam with me..." Keane drew his characters in Griffith's strip, with dialogue written for them by Griffith. Then, on March 7, 1995, Zippy made an appearance, drawn by Griffith, in a Family Circus panel. Griffith said that Family Circus was "the last remaining folk art strip" and that "It's supposed to be the epitome of squareness, but it turns the corner into a hip zone."

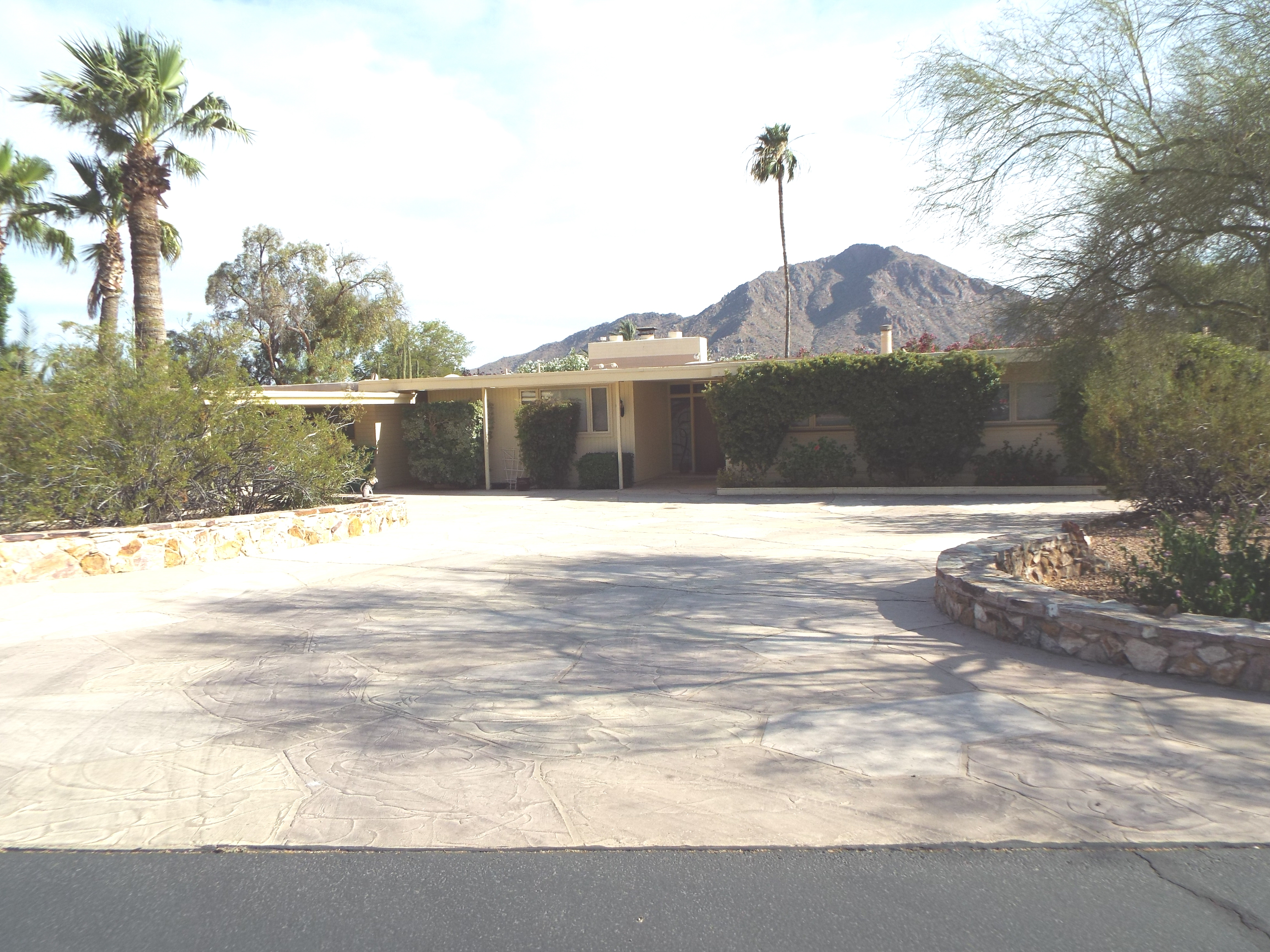
Bil and Thel Keane's house at 5815 E. Joshua Tree Lane in Paradise Valley, Arizona

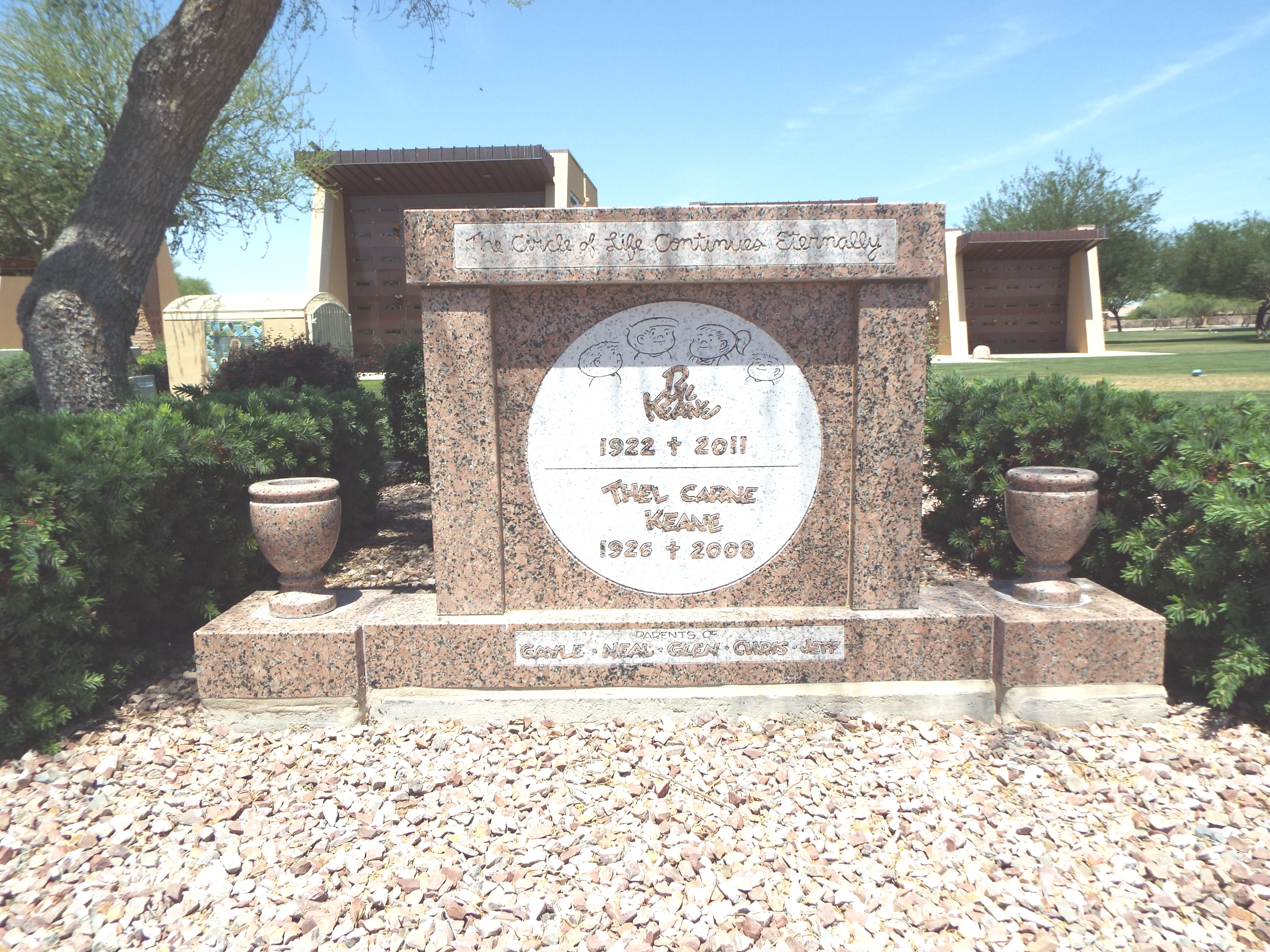
Bil and Thel Keane's tomb in the Holy Redeemer Cemetery in Phoenix, Arizona

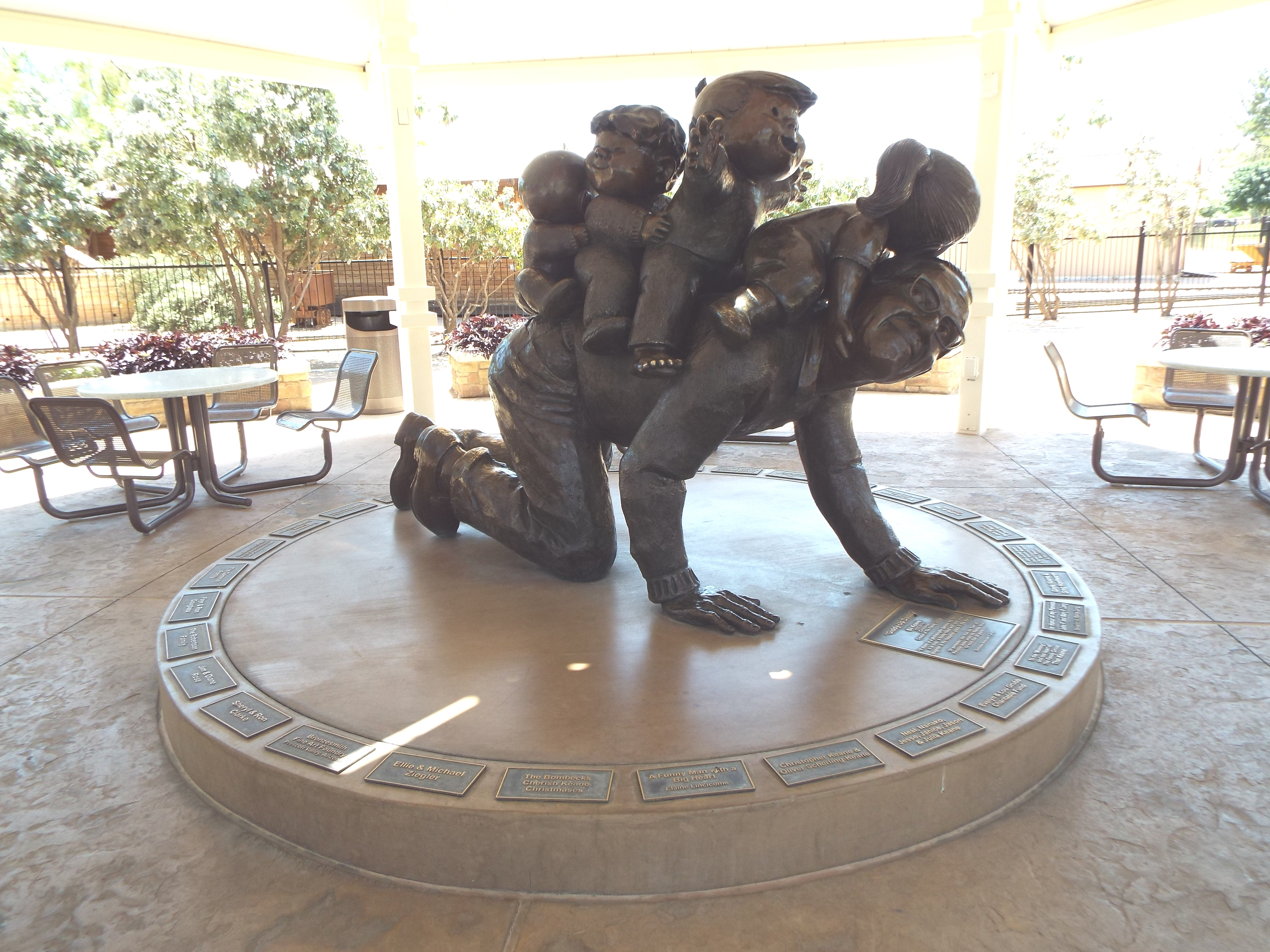
Bil Keane exhibit in the McCormick-Stillman Railroad Park

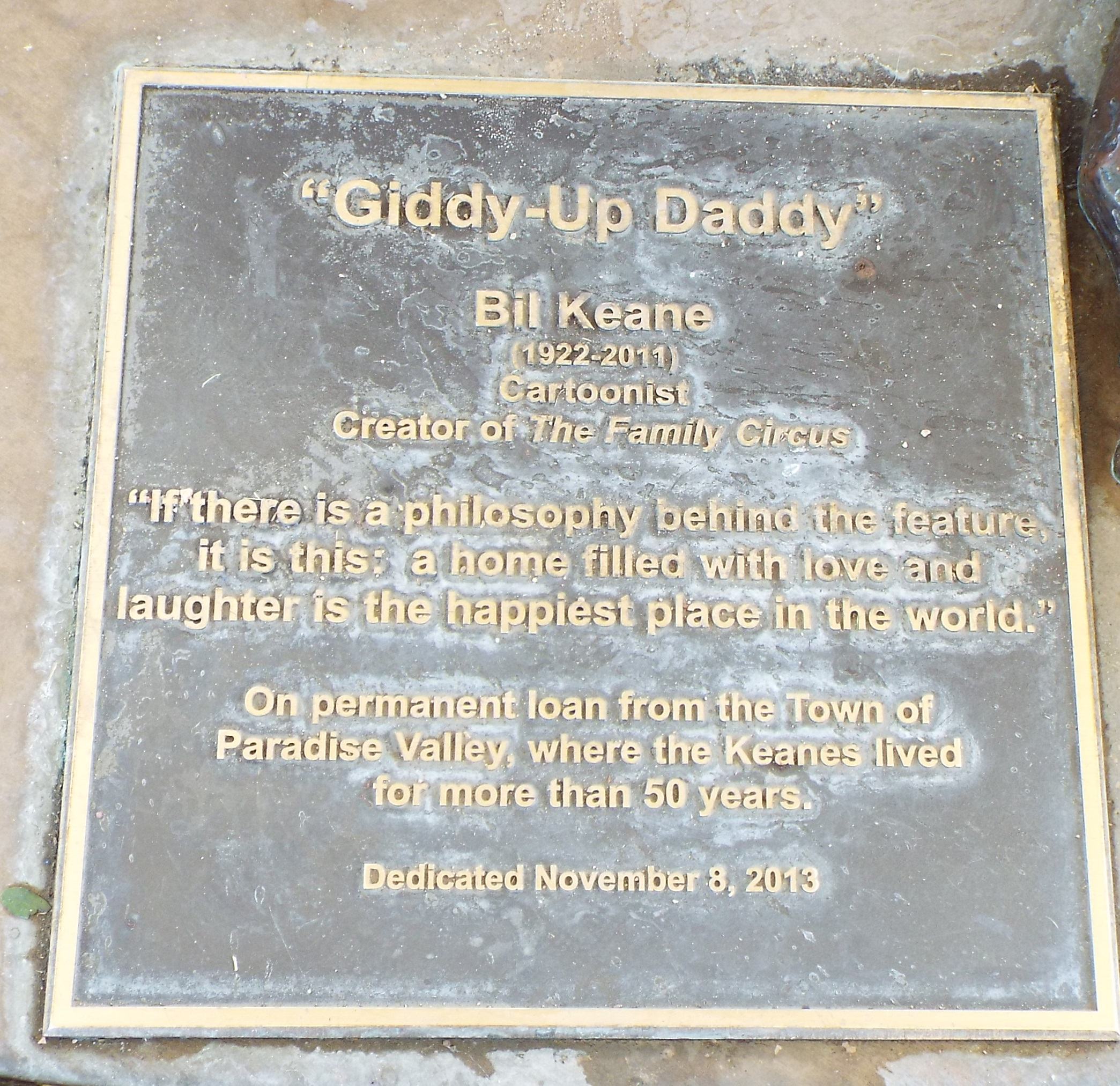
"Giddy-Up Daddy" plaque dedicated to Bil Keane located at the McCormick-Stillman Railroad Park in Scottsdale, Arizona

== Books ==
=== Family Circus collections ===
- The Family Circus (1961)
- The Family Circus Vol. 1 (1965)
- The Family Circus Vol. 2 (1966)
- Sunday with the Family Circus (1966)
- The Family Circus (1967)
- I Need a Hug. (1968)
- Peace, Mommy, Peace! (1969)
- Wanna Be Smiled At? (1970)
- Peekaboo! I Love You! (1971)
- Look Who's Here! (1972)
- Can I Have a Cookie? (1973)
- Hello, Grandma? (1973)
- At Home with the Family Circus (1973)
- I'm Taking a Nap (1974)
- When's Later, Daddy? (1974)
- I Can't Untie My Shoes! (1975)
- Dolly Hit Me Back! (1975)
- Mine: And Yours, Too! (1975)
- Jeffy's Lookin' at Me (1976)
- Smile! (1976)
- Not Me! (1976)
- Quiet! Mommy's Asleep! (1977)
- Sunday with the Family Circus (1977)
- For This I Went to College? (1977)
- Where's PJ? (1978)
- Any Children? (1979)
- Dolly Hit Me Back! (1979)
- Not Me. (1980)
- Daddy's Little Helpers (1980)
- Good Morning, Sunshine! (1980)
- On Vacation with the Family Circus (1980)
- Kittycat's Motor is Running! (1981)
- Who Invented Rain? (1981)
- My Turn Next! (1981)
- Pasghetti and Meat Bulbs! (1981)
- That Family Circus Feeling (1982)
- Go to Your Room! (1982)
- It's Not Easy Bein' the Littlest (1982)
- We'll Help You Get Better (1982)
- Mommy, God's Here (1982)
- PJ's Barefoot All Over! (1989)
- I'm Already Tucked In (1983)
- Pick Up What Things? (1983)
- Grandma Was Here (1983)
- My Turn Next! (1984)
- Love, The Family Circus (1984)
- The Family Circus Parade (1984)
- It's My Birthday Suit (1984)
- I Dressed Myself! (1984)
- How Do You Turn It on? (1985)
- Unquestionably the Family Circus (1985)
- Wanna Be Smiled at? (1985)
- PJ's Still Hungry (1986)
- Heart of the Family Circus (1986)
- He Followed Me Home (1987)
- The Family Circus's Colorful Life (1987)
- We're Home! (1987)
- Where Did the Summer Go? (1987)
- I Could Hear Chewing (1988)
- It's Muddy Out Today (1988)
- Oops! We're Out of Juice (1988)
- The Family Circus is Very Keane (1988)
- Granddad! It's Morning! (1989)
- We Didn't Do It! (1989)
- Baby on Board (1989)
- The Family Circus Memories (1989)
- Behold the Family Circus (1989)
- Quiet, Sam! (1990)
- I Had a Frightmare! (1990)
- I Just Dropped Grandma! (1990)
- I'm Wearin' a Zucchini! (1991)
- The Sky's All Wrinkled (1991)
- It's Up and Let 'Em at Me (1991)
- Through the Year with the Family Circus (1992)
- Look! A Flutterby! (1992)
- Are You Awake, Daddy? (1992)
- I'll Shovel the Cards (1992)
- Sam's Takin' a Catnap! (1992)
- Enjoy Yourselves! (1993)
- What Does This Say? (1994)
- Stay! (1994)
- Count Your Blessings (1995)
- Sing Me a Loveaby? (1995)
- Daddy's Cap Is on Backwards (1996)
- The Family Circus by Request (1998)

=== Special compilations ===
- The Family Circus Treasury, foreword by Erma Bombeck (1977)
- The Family Circus Album, foreword by Charles Schulz (1984)
- The Family Circus is Us (1990)
- Family Circus Library, Vol. 1 by The Library of American Comics (2009)
- Family Circus Library, Vol. 2 by The Library of American Comics (2010)

=== Other cartoon collections ===
- Channel Chuckles (1964)
- Jest in Pun (1966)
- Pun-Abridged Dictionary (1968)
- More Channel Chuckles (1971)
- It's Apparent You're a Parent (1971)
- Deuce and Don'ts of Tennis (1975)
- Eggheads written by Bil Keane and Jeff Keane (1983)

=== Illustrated books ===
- Just Wait Till You Have Children of Your Own! written by Erma Bombeck and Bil Keane (1971)
- Hey, Father! written by Jeanne Marie Lortie, illustrated by Bil Keane (1973)
- Daddy's Surprise Day written by Gale Wiersum, illustrated by Bil Keane (1980)
- Ask Any Mother written by Jean B. Boyce, illustrated by Bil Keane (1991)
- Just Ask Mom written by Jean B. Boyce, illustrated by Bil Keane (1996)
- Just Like Home written by Jean B. Boyce, illustrated by Bil Keane (2001)
