= The Family Circus =

Comic strip

- Strip from October 22, 1960, featuring (L to R) Daddy (Bil), Dolly, Billy, Mommy (Thel), and Jeffy. A fourth child, P.J., was introduced in 1962.
- Author: Bil Keane; Jeff Keane
- Current status/schedule: Running
- Launch date: February 29, 1960; 66 years ago
- Alternate name(s): The Family Circle; Family-Go-Round
- Syndicate(s): (Current) King Features Syndicate (Previous) Register and Tribune Syndicate (1960–1986)
- Genre(s): Humor, gag cartoon, family values, religious
- Preceded by: Silly Philly

The Family Circus (originally The Family Circle, also Family-Go-Round) is a syndicated comic strip created by cartoonist Bil Keane and, since Keane's death in 2011, written, inked and rendered (colored) by his son Jeff Keane. The strip generally uses a single captioned panel with a round border, hence the original name of the series, which was changed following objections from the now defunct magazine Family Circle. The series debuted February 29, 1960, and has been in continuous production ever since. According to publisher King Features Syndicate, it is the most widely syndicated cartoon panel in the world, appearing in 1,500 newspapers. Compilations of Family Circus comic strips have sold more than 13 million copies worldwide.

== Characters ==
=== Family ===
The central characters of Family Circus are a family whose surname is rarely mentioned (although the cartoon of August 26, 2013, in which Billy refers to "Grandma Keane" and "Grandma Carne" indicates the same surnames as the author's family). The parents, Bil and Thelma (Thel), are modeled after the author and his wife, Thelma Carne Keane. Their four children, Billy, Dolly, Jeffy, and P.J., are fictionalized composites of the Keanes' five children. With the exception of P.J., no characters have aged appreciably during the run of the strip.

Bil (named Steve in the early years of the strip) works in an office, and he is believed to be a cartoonist, most likely based on the writer of the strip because he draws large circles on paper, presumably a cartoon version of the Family Circus. Some panels refer to Bil as a veteran of World War II.

Thel is a college-educated homemaker. The Los Angeles Times ran a feature article on the Thelma character when Keane updated her hairstyle in 1996.

The eldest child is seven-year-old Billy. A recurring theme involves Billy as a substitute cartoonist for a Sunday strip. The strips purportedly drawn by Billy are crudely rendered and reflect his understanding of the world and his sense of humor. The first use of this gag by Keane was in This Week magazine in 1962 in a cartoon titled "Life in Our House" that attributed the childish drawings to his six-year-old son Chris. Keane also modeled Billy after his eldest son Glen, who became a prominent Disney animator in adulthood.

The character of five-year-old Dolly was modeled after Keane's daughter and eldest child Gayle. Dolly was a nickname that Thelma Keane called little girls.

The character of three-year-old Jeffy was named and modeled after Keane's youngest child Jeff.

The comic family's youngest child P.J. (Peter John) was introduced through a series of cartoons about the mother's pregnancy that culminated in the baby's birth on August 1, 1962. P.J. grows to be about one year old and rarely speaks.

=== Extended family ===
Bil's mother (Florence, but usually called Grandma) appears regularly in the strip and apparently lives near the family. Bil's father (Al, called Granddad by the kids and Bil) is dead but occasionally appears in the strip as a spirit or watching from heaven. Bil's father (as a spirit) plays a prominent role in the TV special A Family Circus Christmas. Al died after the launch of the feature. However, in the November 25, 2012 strip, it was indicated that he had died before Jeffy was born, although the character Al was featured in strips prior to Granddad's death.

Thel's parents are both alive but apparently live several hundred miles away in a rural area. Strips have mentioned them living in Iowa, but one 2007 strip mentioned Florida. The family occasionally visits them for a vacation.

=== Pets ===
The family pets are two dogs—a Labrador named Barfy and a shaggy-haired mutt named Sam, a stray that the children brought home on January 26, 1970—and an orange tabby cat named Kittycat.

=== Other characters ===
- Morrie is a playmate of Billy, and the only recurring black character in the strip. Keane created the character in 1967 as a tribute to his close friend Morrie Turner, creator of Wee Pals.
- Mr. Horton is Bil's boss.

== Location ==
The Family Circus takes place in Scottsdale, Arizona. They often visit a popular ice cream parlor named the Sugar Bowl (based on a real restaurant of the same name that features many strips signed by Keane), and Jeffy once went to St. Joseph's Hospital for a tonsillectomy. Thel was seen playing tennis with a racket marked "Scottsdale Racket", and Bil mentioned moving up to B class at Scottsdale Racket Club in a 1984 strip. Also, a sign for Paradise Valley, where Bil Keane lived the latter part of his life, is seen in one 1976 strip. Sometimes the family is depicted enjoying snow at their home in the strip, but Scottsdale receives very little snow in the winter. Bil Keane commented that he took aspects of his boyhood in Pennsylvania, such as snow, and added them to the strip.

== Themes ==
=== Religion ===
One distinguishing characteristic of the Family Circus is the frequent use of Christian imagery and themes, ranging from generic references to God to Jeffy daydreaming about Jesus at the grocery store. Keane states that the religious content reflects his own upbringing and family traditions. Keane was Roman Catholic, and in past cartoons the children have been shown attending Catholic schools with sisters as teachers and attending Catholic church services, much as Keane did in his childhood years at St. William Parish in Philadelphia. Keane was a frequent contributor to his high school newspaper The Good News at Northeast Catholic High School for Boys in Philadelphia, where he graduated in 1940. Some of his comics with scenes in Billy's bedroom depict a pennant reading "NC" on the wall, a tribute to his alma mater and his Catholic education.

=== Billy the Substitute Cartoonist ===
Sometimes Keane's strips would have crude drawings purportedly done by "Billy, Age 7". Some of "Billy's" drawings would be explaining vocabulary, only he does not understand the right word, such as confusing "hysterical" with "historical" or defining "acquire" as "a group of singers in church". The "Billy" drawings would often show a more detailed drawing of Keane's, such as Billy crying over losing a game to his father, and then the next strip saying "This is what really happened, by Billy", showing the crude drawing of Billy winning and an annoyed Bil Keane retorting, "No more games, I gotta draw Sunday's cartoon!" One series of strip for the dailies in 1990 had the father away on a business trip while "Billy" explains a multitude of childish reasons for his father's absence, such as alien abduction or having been baked into a witch's pie. The story arc ended with a drawing showing the father back at home and the kids asking about such preposterous happenings to his befuddlement.

=== Dotted lines ===
One of the best-known features of Keane's work is the dotted-line comics, showing the characters' paths through the neighborhood or house with a thick dotted line. The earliest appearance of the dotted line was on April 8, 1962 (an undotted path had first appeared on February 25). This concept has been parodied by other comic strips, including Pearls Before Swine, For Better or For Worse, FoxTrot, Calvin and Hobbes, Garfield, Liō, Marvin and xkcd. In an interview, Jeff Keane, who now produces the strip, described how he creates the line by drawing one continuous black line and then breaking it into segments with white. The dotted line has taken different formats, such as when the family took a vacation to San Francisco and were shown in a dotted line down famous Lombard Street ("the crookedest street in the world"), or Jeffy and his grandfather taking a walk in the park, with Jeffy running around wildly, indicated by an uneven dotted line, with his grandfather's path as a straight dotted line. Other strips would show the dotted line with captions.

=== Gremlins ===
In April 1975, Keane introduced an invisible gremlin named "Not Me" who watches while the children try to shift blame for a misdeed by saying, "Not me." Additional gremlins named "Ida Know" (in September 1975), "Nobody", "O. Yeah!" and "Just B. Cause" were introduced in later years. Although it is clear that the parents do not accept the existence of the gremlins, they did include them as members of the family, perhaps tongue-in-cheek, when being interviewed by a member of the U.S. Census Bureau. Another time when Thel was sick of hearing about the gremlins from the kids ("Who's been rummaging in Gramma's purse?" "Not me!"), she asked her mother-in-law if she had ever dealt with such absurdity, causing Florence to remark, "Well, I'm sure that he has been around at least since I was a little girl", in which there is a flashback to Florence's childhood with her father demanding to know, "Who scratched my new Glenn Miller record?", with little Florence firmly stating, "Not me!" and the "Not Me" entity smugly standing by.

=== Grown children ===
One theme that Keane tried occasionally was to picture the children as adults, or what might come of it. One time when Billy had been asked by Thelma not to leave the house until he finished his homework, she told him, "One day when you are grown up you will thank me for this!", causing Billy to imagine the absurdity of himself as a fully grown man visiting his elderly mother just to thank her for telling him that as a child. Other adult ideas included the parents telling Jeffy not to be shy when they invited friends to the house, and then he is pictured 25 years later as an outgoing late-night talk-show host akin to Jay Leno. Another example showed P.J. not wishing to be introduced to the toddler daughter of family friends, only to show 30 years later that both are now grown and are celebrating their wedding day. Yet another had Thel telling Billy that she cannot clean his messes for his whole life, then imagining a fully grown Billy as a businessman running a chain of "High Hat Hotels" and an aged, weary Thel working as one of the maids.

=== Family car ===
For the first 25 years, the family car was a station wagon, first based on Keane's own 1961 Buick. In 1985, a year after the introduction of the Plymouth Voyager and the Dodge Caravan, the family appears in a series of cartoons trading the station wagon for a new minivan (when the salesman assures Mom and Dad that "Lee Iacocca stands behind every vehicle we sell", the children look behind the van to see if Mr. Iacocca is back there). The family's minivan resembles the Dodge/Plymouth twins and includes the Chrysler corporate pentastar logo on its hood. The children enjoy showing the new van to their friends: "And it has a sliding door, like an elevator." Early strips also showed the family in a small convertible, a caricature based on Keane's Sunbeam Rapier.

== Format ==
=== Daily strip ===
The daily strip consists of a single captioned panel with a round border. The panel is occasionally split in two halves. One unusual practice in the series is the occasional use of both speech balloons within the picture and captions outside the circle. The daily strip does not generally follow a weekly story arc, with the exception of family vacations.

=== Sunday strip ===
The format of the Sunday strip varies considerably from week to week, although there are several well-known recurring themes. One recurring theme is a single picture surrounded by multiple speech balloons, representing the children's response to a given scenario, although the speaker of any given speech balloon is never explicitly shown (this format began on May 30, 1965).

== Other media ==
=== Book collections ===
There are 89 compilations of Family Circus cartoons. For a full list of book titles, see Family Circus collections.

=== Television ===
The Family Circus characters appeared in animated form in three television holiday specials, all broadcast on NBC:
A Special Valentine with the Family Circus (1978),
A Family Circus Christmas (1979),
A Family Circus Easter (1982).
The Easter special featured jazz musician Dizzy Gillespie as the Easter Bunny. This special is a musical and features Dolly singing "Hey There, Easter Bunny".

=== Feature film ===
In October 2010, 20th Century Fox and Walden Media announced that they had acquired the film rights for a live-action feature film based on the Family Circus cartoon. Nichole Millard and Kathryn Price have been hired to adapt the comic strip as a live-action project.

=== Video game ===
An educational video game was released for home computers in 1992. Called Our House featuring the Family Circus (a.k.a. Now and Then), the game compares life in modern times to those when the parents, grandparents and other ancestors of the comic were young.

== Parodies ==
The Family Circus has been widely satirized in film, television, and other daily comic strips. In an interview with The Washington Post, Keane said that he was flattered and believed that such parody "...is a compliment to the popularity of the feature..." The official Family Circus website contains a sampling of syndicated comic strips from other authors which parody his characters.

Some newspaper comic strips have included entire storylines using Family Circus characters. In 1994, the surreal Zippy the Pinhead comic strip made multiple references to the Family Circus, including an extended series during which the titular character, a pinhead, sought "Th' Way" to enlightenment from Bil, Thel, Billy, and Jeffy. Bil Keane was credited as "guest cartoonist" on these strips, drawing the characters exactly as they appear in their own strip, but in Zippy's world as drawn by Zippy creator Bill Griffith. Griffith described the Family Circus as "the last remaining folk art strip". Griffith said, "It's supposed to be the epitome of squareness, but it turns the corner into a hip zone."

For the 1997 April Fools' Day comic strip switcheroo, Dilbert creator Scott Adams swapped cartoons with Keane; and Stephan Pastis drew a series in which Family Circus "invaded" Pearls Before Swine in 2007. Pastis, who had a close relationship with Bil and Jeff Keane, created numerous parodies of Family Circus "because it was an icon".

The Dysfunctional Family Circus was a satire website which paired Keane's illustrations with user-submitted captions. Keane claimed to have found the site funny at first. However, disapproving feedback from his readership, coupled with the website's use of double entendre and vulgarity, prompted Keane to request that the site be discontinued.

The webcomic Jersey Circus is a mashup of artwork from The Family Circus and dialogue from the reality show Jersey Shore. It juxtaposes the innocent artwork of the comic with the often adult dialogue from the show to parody both media phenomena.

The 1999 novel The Funnies, by J. Robert Lennon, centered around a dysfunctional family whose late patriarch drew a cartoon similar to The Family Circus. Lennon later said that, although there was a "resemblance", he did not "know anything about Bil Keane and made up my characters from scratch."

The cartoon has been the subject of gags on many television sitcoms including episodes of Pinky and the Brain, Mystery Science Theater 3000, The Simpsons, Friends, Drawn Together, Robot Chicken, Mad, an episode of Family Guy ("Dog Gone") and the 1999 movie Go.

In the Diary of a Wimpy Kid book and film series, the main character, Greg Heffley, and his dad share a common dislike for the comic strip Lil' Cutie, which Greg claims is "for the lameness of a Family Circus knockoff comic."

Some Pearls Before Swine strips include appearances by the Family Circus characters or parodic Family Circus strips. In one series of strips, Rat is captured by Family Circus fans after poking fun at the Family Circus. In the week of June 27, 2005, Stephan Pastis portrayed the cartoon Keane family inviting Osama bin Laden into their house. Bin Laden is captured by the police while following Billy's dotted lines, and the whole family is imprisoned at Guantanamo Bay for harboring a terrorist.

The 2016 graphic novel The Fun Family by Benjamin Frisch tells the dark story of the family of the creator of a Family Circus-like strip.
