= The Animation Showcase =

Traveling screening of animated short films

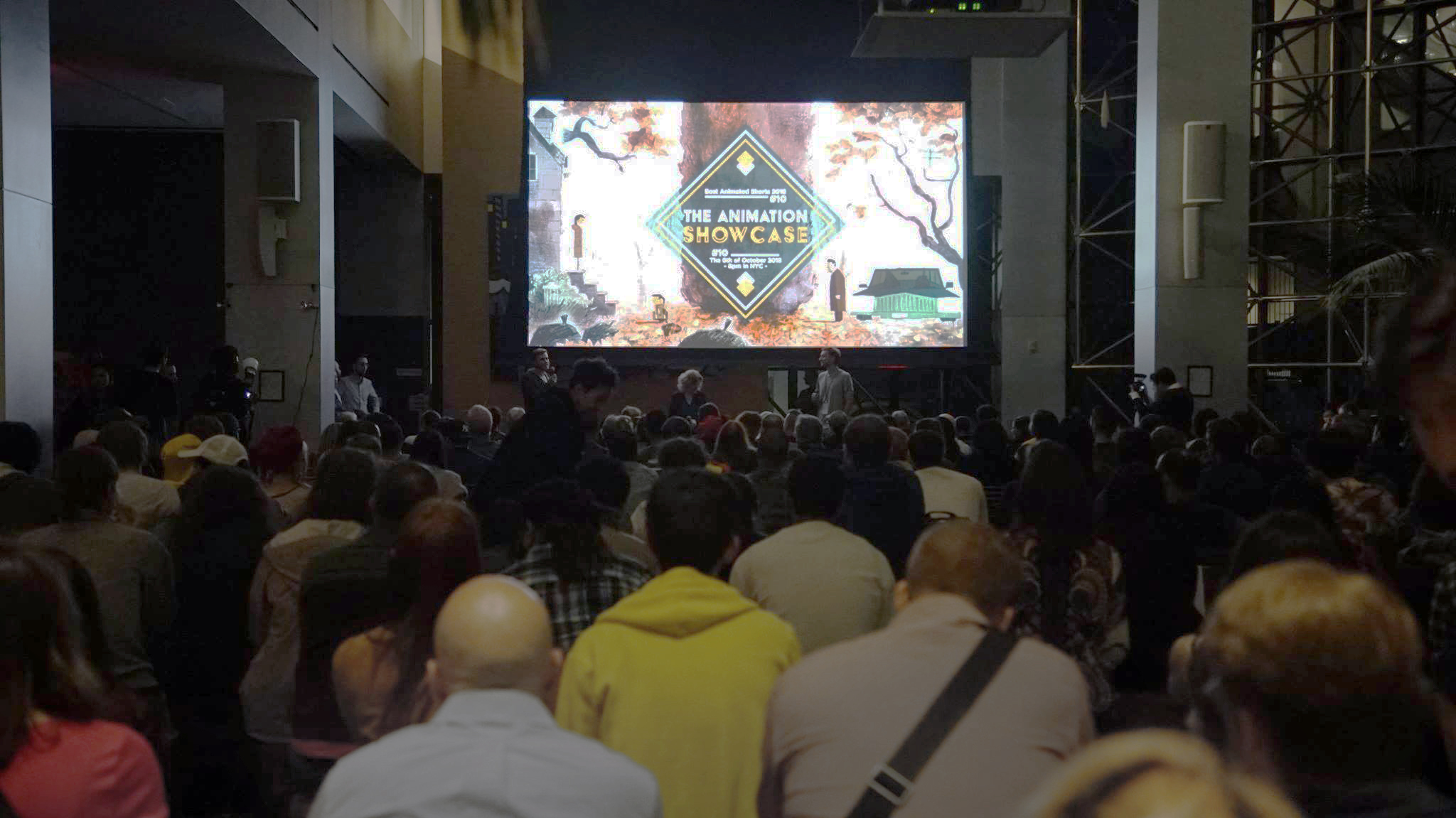
- Status: Active
- Genre: Screening
- Frequency: Quarterly
- Venue: Soho House, Pixar, DreamWorks, Laika, Walt Disney Animation Studios, Google, Cartoon Network, Nexus Productions, Blur Studio
- Established: 2016
- Founder: Benoit Berthe Siward
- Most recent: 1 February 2022
- Website: www.animationshowcase.com

The Animation Showcase is a travelling film screening collection, showcasing animated short films.

== Background ==
With the support of the private members club Soho House, the showcase started in 2016 with the goal of finding upcoming creative talents in the animation industry and promoting animation in the creative industry. The Animation Showcase hosts a yearly "Best of the Year" screening, highlighting films that are likely to become shortlisted and eventual nominees for the Academy Awards Best Animated Short Film category.

The Animation Showcase has been screened in major animation studios, startups, and locations, including Pixar Animation Studios, Laika, Walt Disney Animation Studios, DreamWorks, Google San Francisco, YouTube London, Blur Studio, Cartoon Network, and Soho House (London, New York, Berlin, Shoreditch East London).

The Animation Showcase became available worldwide for members of the film industry via its own streaming platform, which was created during the COVID-19 pandemic.

== Screening format ==
The screening lasts around an hour and ends with a question-and-answer session with invited filmmakers. From 2015 until 2018, the screenings were free entrance and/or by invitation.

== Screening selections ==
=== Best of the year ===
Traveling mostly in Europe and the US, the "Best of the Year" showcase highlights animated short films, months before the official announcement of Academy Awards nominations.

==== Best of 2016 ====
(Premiered in September 2016 Soho House Dean Street.)

- Inner Workings by Leo Matsudas, (Shortlisted at the 89th Oscars)
- Borrowed Time by Andrew Coats and Lou Hamou-Lhadj, (Nominated at the 89th Oscars)
- Blind Vaysha by Theodore Ushev, (Nominated at the 89th Oscars)
- The Head Vanishes by Frank Dion, (Shortlisted at the 89th Oscars)
- Piper by Alan Barillaro, (Academy Award Winner at the 89th Oscars)
- Peripheria by David Coquard-Dassault, (Qualified at the 89th Oscars)
- To Build a Fire by Fx Goby, (Qualified at the 89th Oscars)

==== Best of 2017 ====
(Premiered in October 2017 at Soho House Dean Street.)

- Garden Party by Illogic Collective, (Nominated at the 90th Oscars)
- Negative Space by Max Porter and Ru Kuwahata, (Nominated at the 90th Oscars)
- Dear Basketball by Glen Keane and Kobe Bryant, (Academy Award Winner at the 90th Oscars)
- Lou by Dave Mullins and Dana Murray, (Nominated at the 90th Oscars)
- In a Heartbeat by Esteban Bravo and Beth David, (Shortlisted at the 90th Oscars)
- Wednesday With Goddard by Nicolas Menard, (Qualified at the 90th Oscars)
- The Burden by Niki Lindroth von Bahr, (Qualified at the 90th Oscars)

==== Best of 2018 ====
(Premiered in October 2018 at Blue Sky Studios USA.)

- Bilby by Pierre Perifel, Liron Topaz, and JP Sans (Shortlisted at the 91st Oscars)
- Late Afternoon by Louise Bagnall (Nominated at the 91st Oscars)
- Weekends by Trevor Jimenez (Nominated at the 91st Oscars)
- Bao by Domee Shi (Academy Award Winner at the 91st Oscars)
- Grandpa Walrus by Lucrèce Andreae (Shortlisted at the 91st Oscars)
- La Noria by Carlos Baena (Qualified at the 91st Oscars)
- One Small Step by Andrew Chesworth and Bobby Pontillas (Nominated at the 91st Oscars)
- Hybrids by Florian Brauch, Kim Tailhades, Yohan Thireau, Matthieu Pujol, and Romain Thirion (Qualified at the 91st Oscars)

==== Best of 2019 ====
(Premiered in October 2019 at Blue Sky Studios USA.)

- Maestro by Bloom Pictures (Qualified at the 92nd Oscars)
- My Moon by Eusong Lee (Qualified at the 92nd Oscars)
- The Ostrich Politic by Mohammad Houhou (Qualified at the 92nd Oscars)
- Mémorable by Bruno Collet (Nominated at the 92nd Oscars)
- Kitbull by Rosana Sullivan (Nominated at the 92nd Oscars)
- Coaster by Amos Sussigan (Qualified at the 92nd Oscars)
- Hair Love by Matthew A. Cherry (Academy Award Winner at the 92nd Oscars)
- Les Mans 1955 by Quentin Baillieux (Qualified at the 92nd Oscars)
- Uncle Thomas by Regina Pessoa (Shortlisted at the 92nd Oscars)
- Hors Piste by Oscar Malet, Léo Brunel, Camille Jalabert, and Loris Cavalier (Shortlisted at the 92nd Oscars)
- Sister by Siqi Song (Nominated at the 92nd Oscars)

==== Best of 2020 ====
(Premiered in November 2020 at Aardman Animations Studios UK. via The Animation Showcase Streaming Platform)

- Kapaemahu by Joe Wilson, Dean Hamer, and Hinaleimoana Wong-Kalu (Shortlisted at the 93rd Oscars)
- The Snail and the Whale by Max Lang & Daniel Snaddon (Shortlisted at the 93rd Oscars)
- Wild Love by Corentin Yvergniaux, Quentin Camus, Paul Autric, Léa Georges, Maryka Laudet, and Zoé Sottiaux (Qualified at the 93rd Oscars)
- My Life in Versailles by Clémence Madeleine-Perdrillat and Nathaniel H'limi (Qualified at the 93rd Oscars)
- Opera by Erick Oh (Nominated at the 93rd Oscars)
- Float by Bobby Rubio (Qualified at the 93rd Oscars)
- KKUM by Kim Kang-min (Qualified at the 93rd Oscars)
- If Anything Happens I Love You by Will McCormack & Michael Govier (Academy Award Winner at the 93rd Oscars)
- Genius Loci by Adrien Mérigeau (Nominated at the 93rd Oscars)
- Just a Guy by Shoko Hara (Qualified at the 93rd Oscars)
- Yes People by Gísli Darri Halldórsson (Nominated at the 93rd Oscars)
- Burrow by Madeline Sharafian (Nominated at the 93rd Oscars)
- Something to Remember by Niki Lindroth von Bahr (Qualified at the 93rd Oscars)

==== Best of 2021 ====
(Premiered in November 2021 at Netflix via The Animation Showcase Streaming Platform)

- Affairs of the Art by Joanna Quinn & Les Mils (Nominated at the 94th Oscars)
- Souvenir Souvenir by Bastien Dubois (Shortlisted at the 94th Oscars)
- Robin Robin by Dan Ojari & Mikey Please (Nominated at the 94th Oscars)
- The Windshield Wiper by Alberto Mielgo & Leo Sanchez (Academy Award Winner at the 94th Oscars)
- Bestia by Hugo Covarrubias (Nominated at the 94th Oscars)
- Namoo by Erick Oh (Shortlisted at the 94th Oscars)
- Mum is Pouring Rain by Hugo de Faucompret (Shortlisted at the 94th Oscars)
- Louis' Shoes by MoPA School (2021 Student Academy Award Winner & Qualified at the 94th Oscars)
- The Boob Fairy by Léahn Vivier Chapas (Qualified at the 94th Oscars)

==== Best of 2022 ====
(Premiered in November 2022 at Pixar USA)

- Black Slide by Uri Lotan (Shortlisted at the 95th Oscars)
- My Year of Dicks by Sara Gunnarsdóttir (Nominated at the 95th Oscars)
- Steakhouse by Špela Čadež (Shortlisted at the 95th Oscars)
- Pasajero (Passenger) by Juan Pablo Zaramella (Shortlisted at the 95th Oscars)
- Ice Merchants by João Gonzalez (Nominated at the 95th Oscars)
- Christopher at Sea by Tom C.J. Brown (Qualified at the 95th Oscars)
- The Flying Sailor by Amanda Forbis and Wendy Tilby (Nominated at the 95th Oscars)
- The Boy, the Mole, the Fox and the Horse by Peter Baynton and Charlie Mackesy (Academy Award Winner at the 95th Oscars)
- An Ostrich Told Me The World Is Fake and I Think I Believe It by Lachlan Pendragon (2022 Student Academy Award Winner & Nominated at the 95th Oscars)

==== Best of 2023 ====
(Premiered in November 2023 at Pixar USA)

- Letter to a Pig by Tal Kantor (Nominated at the 96th Oscars)
- Starling by Mitra Shahidi (Qualified at the 96th Oscars)
- Wild Summon by Karni Arieli & Saul Freed (Shortlisted at the 96th Oscars)
- 27 by Flóra Anna Buda (Shortlisted at the 96th Oscars)
- Electra by Daria Kashcheeva (Qualified at the 96th Oscars)
- War Is Over! by Dave Mullins (Academy Award Winner at the 96th Oscars)
- Armat by Élodie Dermange (Qualified at the 96th Oscars)
- Once Upon a Studio by Dan Abraham & Trent Correy (Shortlisted at the 96th Oscars)
- Rosemary A.D (After Dad) by Ethan Barrett (Qualified at the 96th Oscars)
- Scale by Joseph Pierce (Qualified at the 96th Oscars)

==== Best of 2024 ====
(Premiered in October 2024 at Illumination Paris)

- Beautiful Men by Nicolas Keppens (Nominated at the 97th Oscars)
- Maybe Elephants by Torill Kove (Shortlisted at the 97th Oscars)
- Wander to Wonder by Nina Gantz (Nominated at the 97th Oscars)
- A Bear Named Wojtek by Iain Gardner (Shortlisted at the 97th Oscars)
- In the Shadow of the Cypress by Hossein Molayemi & Shirin Sohani (Academy Award Winner at the 97th Oscars)
- Percebes by Alexandra Ramires & Laura Gonçalves (Shortlisted at the 97th Oscars)
- Yuck! by Loïc Espuche (Nominated at the 97th Oscars)
- La Perra by Carla Melo Gampert (Qualified at the 97th Oscars)
- A Crab in the Pool by Alexandra Myotte & Jean-Sébastien Hamel (Shortlisted at the 97th Oscars)
- Nube by Christian Arredondo Narváez & Diego Alonso Sánchez de la Barquera Estrada (Qualified at the 97th Oscars)

==== Best of 2025 ====
(Premiered in October 2025 at LAIKA Studios Portland)

- Forevergreen by Nathan Engelhardt & Jeremy Spears (Nominated at the 98th Oscars)
- Retirement Plan by John Kelly (Nominated at the 98th Oscars)
- Playing God by Matteo Burani (Shortlisted at the 98th Oscars)
- The Girl Who Cried Pearls by Chris Lavis and Maciek Szczerbowski (Academy Award Winner at the 98th Oscars)
- I Died in Irpin by Anastasiia Falileieva (Shortlisted at the 98th Oscars)
- Éiru by Giovanna Ferrari (Shortlisted at the 98th Oscars)
- Shadows by Rand Beiruty (Qualified at the 97th Oscars)
- Hurikán by Jan Saska (Shortlisted at the 98th Oscars)
- The Night Boots by Pierre-Luc Granjon (Shortlisted at the 98th Oscars)
- Snow Bear by Aaron Blaise (Shortlisted at the 98th Oscars)
- Cardboard by J.P. Vine (Shortlisted at the 98th Oscars)

== Themed programs ==
The Animation Showcase screenings started as a series of themed selections, premiered every three months at Soho House and Shoreditch House

- The promising Generation Y - (Premiered in August 2016 at Soho Works)
- What the F#ck - (Premiered in 2016 at Soho Works)
- Art in Motion - (Premiered in 2017 at Shoreditch House)
- Love at First Sight - (Premiered in 2017 at Shoreditch House)
- Our Animal Friends - (Premiered in 2018 at Shoreditch House)
- The French Touch in Music Video - (Premiered in 2018 at The Animation Workshop)
- Best French shorts successes - (Premiered in 2018 at The Animation Workshop)

== See also ==
- International Tournee of Animation
- Independent animation
- Submissions for Best Animated Short Academy Award
