= List of submissions for the Academy Award for Best Animated Short Film =

== Background ==
Animation historian Jerry Beck had posted on Cartoon Research lists of animated shorts from various studios considered for nomination of the Academy Award for Best Animated Short Film, beginning with 1948 and ending for the time being with 1986.

Missing gaps on that site are 1949, 1950, 1976, 1981, 1982 and 1985.

Note: ± means the film was nominated for the award.

== Notable films ==
=== 1937 ===
Film (studio)	References
Popeye the Sailor Meets Ali Baba's Forty Thieves (Fleischer Studios)	
Zula Hulu (Fleischer Studios)
The Wayward Pups (MGM)
September in the Rain (Warner Bros)
The Dog and the Bone (aka Puddy Picks a Bone!) (Terrytoons)
Hawaiian Holiday (Disney)
Pluto's Quin-puplets (Disney)
Donald's Ostrich (Disney)

=== 1940 ===
Film (studio)	Reference
Snubbed By a Snob (Fleischer Studios)	
You Ought to Be in Pictures (Warner Bros)
Raggedy Ann and Raggedy Andy (Fleischer Studios)
Knock Knock (Walter Lantz/Universal)
Billy Mouse’s Akwakade (Terrytoons)
Mad Hatter (Screen Gems)
Western Daze (George Pal)
Wimmin Is a Myskery (Fleischer Studios)
The Early Worm Gets the Bird (Warner Bros)
Cross Country Detors (Warner Bros)
Recruiting Daze (Walter Lantz/Universal)

=== 1943 ===
Film (studio)	Reference
What's Cookin' Doc? (Warner Bros)	

=== 1946 ===
Film (studio)	Reference
Rhapsody Rabbit (Warner Bros)	

=== 1947 ===
Film (studio)	Reference
Buccaneer Bunny (Warner Bros)	
Hop, Look and Listen (Warner Bros)
Scaredy Cat (Warner Bros)

=== 1948 ===
Title	Studio	Director	Producer	Result
Base Brawl	Famous Studios	Seymour Kneitel	Sam Buchwald	Not nominated
Hep Cat Symphony	Famous Studios	Seymour Kneitel	Sam Buchwald	Not nominated
The Little Orphan	MGM Cartoons	William Hanna and Joseph Barbera	Fred Quimby	Won Academy Award
Mickey and the Seal	Walt Disney Productions	Charles Nichols	Walt Disney	Nominated
Mouse Wreckers	Warner Bros. Cartoons	Charles M. Jones	Edward Selzer	Nominated
Robin Hoodlum	United Productions of America	John Hubley	Stephen Bosustow	Nominated
Taming the Cat	Terrytoons	Connie Rasinski	Paul Terry	Not nominated
Tea for Two Hundred	Walt Disney Productions	Jack Hannah	Walt Disney	Nominated
The 3 Minnies	Impossible Pictures/Republic	Leonard Levinson	Leonard Levinson	Not nominated
Wags to Riches	MGM Cartoons	Tex Avery	Fred Quimby	Not nominated
Wild and Woody!	Walter Lantz Productions	Dick Lundy	Walter Lantz	Not nominated

=== 1950s ===
Year	Film (studio)	Reference
1951 (23rd)	Alpine for You (Famous Studios); By Leaps and Hounds (Famous Studios); Magic Canvas (Halas & Batchelor); One Cab's Family (MGM); Gift Wrapped (Warner Bros); Little Beau Pepé (Warner Bros); Ballot Box Bunny (Warner Bros); Slingshot 6 7/8 (Walter Lantz/Universal International); Sing Again of Michigan (Famous Studios); To Boo or Not to Boo (Famous Studios); Sloppy Jalopy (UPA)	
1952	Around Is Around (NFB); The Case of the Cockeyed Canary (Famous Studios); Duck Amuck (Warner Bros); Gag and Baggage (Famous Studios); Gerald McBoing-Boing's Symphony (UPA); Ghost of the Town (Famous Studios); John Gilpin (Halas & Batchelor); Kermesse Fantastique (Josef Mizik); A Mouse Divided (Warner Bros); Mice Capades (Famous Studios); Popeye's Pappy (Famous Studios); The Little House (Disney); Termites from Mars (Walter Lantz/Universal International); Trick or Treat (Disney)	
1953	Herman the Catoonist (Famous Studios); Hypnotic Hick (Walter Lantz/Universal International); Starting from Hatch (Famous Studios); Just Ducky (MGM); Toreadorable (Famous Studios); The Figurehead (Louis de Rochemont Associates); The Flying Turtle (Walter Lantz/Universal International); Boo Moon (Famous Studios); Magoo Goes Skiing (UPA); No Place Like Rome (Famous Studios)	
1954	Casper Genie (Famous Studios); Grand Canyonscope (Disney); Tara the Stonecutter (Mayfair Pictures); Fright to the Finish (Famous Studios); Fido Beta Kappa (Famous Studios); Pizzicato Pussycat (Warner Bros); Rail Rodents (Famous Studios); Bewitched Bunny (Warner Bros)	
1955	A Job for a Gob (Famous Studios); Spooking for the Brogue (Famous Studios); Dizzy Dishes (Famous Studios); Magoo Makes News (UPA); Monsieur Herman (Famous Studios)	
1956	A Cowboy Needs a Horse (Disney); A Short Vision (George K. Arthur); Down Beat Bear (MGM); Dutch Treat (Famous Studios); Hooked Bear (Disney); Hill-billing and Cooing (Famous Studios); Mousetro Herman (Famous Studios); Three Little Bops (WB); The Talking Dog (Walter Lantz/Universal International); How to Have An Accident in the Home (Disney); Pedro and Lorenzo (Famous Studios); Hill Billing and Cooing (Famous Studios); Calling All Cuckoos (Walter Lantz/Universal International)	
1957	Tom's Photo Finish (MGM); What's Opera, Doc? (WB); Box Car Bandit (Walter Lantz/Universal International); It's a Living (Terrytoons); Magoo's Private War (UPA); The Bone Ranger (Terrytoons); The Bongo Punch (Walter Lantz/Universal International); The Juggler of Our Lady (Terrytoons); The Juggler of Our Lady (Cavalcade Pictures); The Adventures of * (John Hubley and Faith Hubley); Flebus (Terrytoons); Springtime for Clobber (Terrytoons)	
1958	The Little Island (Richard Williams); Magoo's Three-Point Landing (UPA); Robin Hoodwinked (MGM); Jittery Jester (Walter Lantz/Universal International); Little Televillain (Walter Lantz/Universal International); The Mouse that Jack Built (WB); Finnegan's Flea (Famous Studios); Surprise Boogie (Albert Pierru); Sailing and Village Band (UPA)	
1959	Down to Mirth (Famous Studios); Felineous Assault (Famous Studios); Hashimoto-san (Terrytoons); Little Bo Bopped (Columbia); Magoo Meets Boing Boing (The Noise-Making Boy) (UPA); Picnics Are Fun and Dino's Serenade (UPA); TV Fuddlehead (Famous Studios); The Minute and a ½ Man (Terrytoons)	

=== 1960s ===
Year	Film (studio)	Reference
1960 (33rd)	Cow on the Moon (Zagreb Film); I Was a Teenage Magoo (UPA); Piccolo (Zagreb Film); The Black Cat (Robert Braverman); The Interview (Ernest Pintoff); Samson Scrap (Rembrandt Films); Snoopy Loopy (Columbia); Southern Fried Hospitality (Walter Lantz/Universal International); Tin Pan Alley Cat (Terrytoons); Top Cat (Famous Studios)	
1961	Abner the Baseball (Famous Studios); Catch Meow (Columbia); Drum Roll (Terrytoons); Hawaiian Guy (UPA); Riding Hood Magoo (UPA); Sleeping Beauty (Jay Ward); Snidely's Monster (Jay Ward); The Lion and Albert (Robert Fenwick); The Tom and Jerry Cartoon Kit (MGM); Tree Spree (Terrytoons)	
1962	The Astronauts (Argos Films); Banty Raids (WB); Barbara (Interlude Films); Europa (Pelican Films); Everyday Chronicle (Zagreb Film); Home Life (Terrytoons); The Old Man and the Flower (Ernest Pintoff); Petroushka (Fine Arts Films)	
1963	How to Win on the Thruway (Gene Deitch); Operation Moonshot (Phil Davis and Dusan Vukotic); The Great Rights (William Hurtz); The Hangman (Paul Julian and Les Goldman); The Ringading Kid (Famous Studios); Spooki-Yaki (Terrytoons); Mouse Blanche (Famous Studios)	
1964	A Finnish Fable (Carmen D’Vino); Breaking the Habit (John Korty); Dead and Sunrise (Eyvind Earle); Fix That Clock (Famous Studios); Gadmouse the Apprentice Good Fairy (Terrytoons); Little Boy Bad (Columbia); Rooftop Razzle Dazzle (Universal-Lantz); The Hat (Hubley); Three Little Woodpeckers (Universal-Lantz)	
1965	A (Jan Lenica); Alf, Bill and Fred (Bob Godfrey); Carnival - The World of Sine (Jules Engel); Claude (Dan McLaughlin); Dress Reversal (Terrytoons); Drive on, Nudnik (Gene Deitch); The Great De Gaulle Stone Operation (DePatie-Freleng); The Hoffnung Symphony Orchestra (Halas and Batchelor); How to Live with a Neurotic Dog (Gene Deitch); Howard (Stars and Stripes Forever Productions); The Itch (Famous Studios); A Leak in the Dike (Famous Studios); The Nose (Alexandre Alexieff & Claire Parker); The Wild Chase (WB); Winnie the Pooh and the Honey Tree (Disney); The Top (Murakami-Wolf); Enter Hamlet (Fred Mogubgub); Woof-Woof (Zagreb Studio)	
1966	Funny is Funny (Universal); Guided Mouse-ille (MGM); The Hand (Jiri Trnka); The Wall (Zagreb); Birds, Bees and Storks (Halas & Batchelor); Boniface's Holiday (Soyuzmultfilm)	
1967	Calypso Singer (Paul Glickman); The Bear That Wasn't (MGM); Breath (Murakami-Wolf); Escalation (Ward Kimball); Norman Normal (WB); Numbers (Stefan Schabenbeck); Psychedelic Pink (DePatie-Freleng); Scrooge McDuck and Money (Disney); The Shooting of Dan McGrew (Universal); The Plumber (Paramount); My Daddy the Astronaut (Paramount); Why Are You Smiling, Mona Lisa? (Jiri Brdecka)	
1968	An American Time Capsule (Charles Braverman); Good Neighbor Nudnik (Rembrandt-Paramount); Hurts and Flowers (DePatie-Freleng); K-9000: A Space Oddity (Robert Mitchell & Robert Swarthe); The Fly (Zagreb); The Power of Destiny (Jiří Brdečka); The Wacky World of Numburrs (Bosustow Productions); Bunny and Claude (WB); Koncertissimo (Pannonia Film Studio); Pollution (Astrafilms)	
1969	Anansi the Spider (Gerald McDermott); Permutations (John Whitney); Injun Trouble (WB); My Son the King (Bob Kurtz); Noises in the Night (Bosustow); Opera Cordis (Zagreb); Scratch a Tiger (DePatie-Freleng); Shamrock and Roll (WB); The Caterpillar and the Wild Animals (Joseph Brenner Assiociates); The Great Walled City of Xan (University of Southern California); The Good Friend (Murakami-Wolf); The Giants (Gene Deitch); The Kidnapping Of The Sun And The Moon (Hungarofilm)	

=== 1970s ===
Year	Film (studio)	Reference
1970 (43rd)	The Black and White and Trouble in The Works (Gerald Potterton); Eggs (John Hubley and Faith Hubley); Flower Lovers (Borivoj Dovniković-Bordo, Zagreb Film); Hop and Chop (DePatie-Freleng); Lance (David Oliver Pfeil); Masque of the Red Death (Pavao Štalter and Branco Ranitovic, Zagreb Film); Matrix (John Whitney); Peace (John G. Marshall); Please Do not Touch (John G. Marshall); Susan (Richard J. Finley & Duane Shelby Ament)	
1971 (44th)	Synchromy (NFB); Dig (Hubley); Donovan's Old Fashioned Picture Book (Tony Benedict); Freedom River (Stephen Bosustow Productions); Keep Cool (Barrie Nelson); The Pink Flea (DePatie-Freleng); The Tool Box (Gene Warren); Venus and the Cat (Zlatko Bourek, Zagreb Film)	
1972 (45th)	Free; Good Grief (Mike Jittlov); The Giving Tree (Charlie O. Haywood); The Headless Horseman of Sleepy Hollow (Stephen Bosustow Productions); The Mad Baker (Ted Petock); Super Joe (Dan McRae)	
1973 (46th)	Brainwash (Ronald Bijlsma); Foot Fetish (Randal Kleiser); Love Me, Love Me, Love Me (Richard Williams); Balablok (NFB); B.C.: The First Thanksgiving (Abe Levitow); Cockaboody (Hubley); Sandman (Eli Noyes); Potpourri (Les Kaluza); The Last Cartoon Man (Jeffery Hale and Derek Lamb); The Maggot (George Dunning); A Future for Every Child (Colin Giles); A Very Merry Cricket (Chuck Jones)	
1974 (47th)	Butterfly Ball (Halas and Batchelor); Diary (Zagreb Film); The Death Hour (Fred Crippen); Deep Blue World (Ken Rudolph); Evolu (John Leach); Fantaro (Jan Lenica); H-a (Julius Kohanyi); The Happy Prince (Murray Shostack & Michael Mills); I Am a Rainbow (Dorothy Wayne, Richard Loring and Harry Sherda); Melon Madness (Jon Adrian Wokuluk); O Lala (Les Kaluza); Opera (Bruno Bozzetto and Guido Manuli); Popcorn (Ross Sutherland and Gil Rosoff); Roll 'em Lola (Fred Burns); Room and Board (Randy Cartwright); A Better Train of Thought (Pannonia); A Snort History (Stan Phillips); Teenage Idol (Peggy Okeya); The Touch (Ernest Pintoff); Twins (Barrie Nelson); Uvalde (Gordon Bellamy); Yetta the Yenta (Ted Petok); Zipstones (Jan Rofekamp)	
1975 (48th)	Arabesque (John Whitney); The Beast of Monsieur Racine (Weston Woods); Coney (Frank Mouris); Choice Stakes (Stan Phillips and Pat Oliphant); Boobs a Lot (Leonard Ellis); High in the Saddle (Steve Sharon); Oni (Kihachiro Kawamoto); Optimist and Pessimist (Zlatko Grgić); Perspectrum (NFB); Quasi at the Quackadero (Sally Cruikshank); Red Ball Express (Steve Segal); Gubecziana (Dušan Vukotić); Sooper Goop (Chuck Swenson-Churchill Films); L'Empreinte (Jaques Cardon); UNICEF is Sharing (Paul Fierlinger); Whazzat? An Arabic Folk Tale (Art Pierson); Who Are We? (NFB); W.O.W. (Faith Hubley); Yin Hsien (Michael Whitney)	
1977 (50th)	All, All and All; Animato (Mike Jittov); Conquering the Paper Mountain; A Cosmic Christmas (Nelvana); Crude (Paul Boyington); David (Paul Driessen); Dead End (Janet Shapiro); Fight (Marcell Jankovics); Froggie went a Courtin’ (Frank Gladstone); Lafcadio: The Lion Who Shot Back (Larry Moyer); Joshua and the Shadow (John Lange); Last of the Red-Hot Dragons (Shamus Culhane); Lay Lady Lay; The Little Brown Burro (Paul Freisen); The Fisherman and His Wife (Sam Weiss-Bosustow Productions); Mindscape (Le paysagiste) (NFB); Ode; Party Line (Karl Krogstad); Red Rock (Marija Diaz); Something; Symbiosis; Voo Doo Chile	
1978 (51st)	A Place on the Tramway (George Csonka); All About Music (Fred Calvert); Astronauts and Jelly Beans (Dan Bessie); Afterlife (NFB); The Big Sniff (Paul Gruwell); Building (Bob LeBar); Cartoon-A-Torial (Hal Seegar); Concrete Ally (McKinney); Country Jam (Tony Benedict); Fantabiblical (Guido Manulli); Hot Lunches (Loring Doyle); I Like Old Clothes (Bosustow Productions); Impasse (Frank Mouris); Jorinde and Joringel (Niek Reus); Kolo (Marija Dail); Love (Jiří Brdečka); Make Me Psychic (Sally Cruikshank); Mother Goose (David Bishop); The Oriental Nightfish (Ian Eames); No Room At the Inn (R.O. Blechman); Pencil Booklings (Kathy Rose); Pinktails for Two (DePatie-Freleng); Satiemania (Zagreb Film); The Small One (Disney); Why Me? (NFB); Furies (Sarah Petty); Fantabiblical (Guido Manulli); Impasse (Frank Mouris); Rainbow Land (Paul Fierlinger); A Routine Day (Al Guest); Scenes with Beans (Pannonia); Step by Step (Faith Hubley); Tasteful Romance (Clint Clover); Universal Rhythms (Dov Jacobson); Urashima Taro (Peggy Okeya)	
1979 (52nd)	Confessions of a Stardreamer (John Canemaker); Asparagus (Suzan Pitt); Boom; Freefall; Going to Heaven; Smile for Auntie (Weston Woods); Stalk of the Celery Monster (Tim Burton); Lady and the Lamp (John Lasseter); Life and Death; Log Driver's Waltz (NFB); The Wizard of Speed and Time (Mike Jittlov); Animalympics-Winter Games (Steven Lisberger); Banjo the Woodpile Cat (Don Bluth); Harpya (Raoul Servais); The Cask of Amontillado (Bernard Wilets); The Invitation; The Little Prince (Will Vinton); The Magic Flute (Emanuele Luzzati and Giulio Gianini); The Mountain; Mr. Pascal (Alison de Vere); No, No Pickle (Jon Wokuluk); Night Flights; King Tut Goes to McDonalds; Scheherazade; Skylight; A View from Above; We Think The World Is Round (Rudy Larriva); Zbigniew in Love	

=== 1980s ===
Year	Film (studio)	Reference
1980 (53rd)	Audition (Candy Kugel); Beginnings (Gaston Sarrult, NFB); Bio-Woman (Bob Godfrey and John Halas); Boogie Night (Nate Smith); The Cube (Zdeněk Smetana); Dance (Gabor Csupo); Dinosaur (Will Vinton); Disco Fence (Leo Salkin); Duck Dodgers and the Return of the 241/2th Century (Chuck Jones, WB); Eagle and the Hawk (Tom Hush); Elbowing (Paul Driessen); Energica (Ion Popescu-Gopo, Animafilm); Exilo (Jamie Gesundheit, Jorge Lopez, Alan Shapiro); Fisheye (Joško Marušić, Zagreb Film); Getting Started (Richard Condie, NFB); The Ghost in the Shed (Sam Weiss, Bosustow Entertainment); The Good, The Bad, and the Furry (Dean Barnes); Look Out For Number One (John Lange); Mayor's Bon Bon's Band (Raymond Lea); Nothing (Jim Comstock); On Land, at Sea and in the Air (Paul Driessen); Opens Wednesday (Barrie Nelson); Seaside Woman (Oscar Grillo); Sections (Sean Phillips); Sing Beast Sing (Marv Newland); The Sorcerer's Apprentice (Peter Sandler); A Sufi Tale (Gayle Thomas, NFB); The Sweater (Sheldon Cohen, NFB); Tuesday (Carl Bressler)	
1983 (56th)	Album (Krešimir Zimonić); Bachelorette Pad (Anita Rosenberg); The Boy Who Cried Wolf (Paul M. Buchbinder); Bottom's Dream (John Canemaker); Dance to Death (Dennis Tupicoff); Dissipative Dialogues (David Ehrlich); Eat the Beat (Dreu McCutchen); Greeting Card (Gregory William Schmidt); Journey Through Time: The Human Story (Derek Lamb); Lady Tree (Howard Danelowitz); Lights (Yehuda Wertzel); Morris's Disappearing Bag (Michael Sporn); Narcissus (NFB); Your Feet's Too Big (Nancy Beiman); Machine Story (Doug Miller); Mirror of Kings: Tales from the Kalila Wa Dimna (Karen Lonelan); No One For Chess? (Richard Rosser); Players (John Halas); Soul Sailing (Robert Faust); Spirit of the Dream-House (Robert Topagi); The Rubber Stamp Film (Joanna Priestley); You Gotta Serve Somebody (John Wilson)	
1984 (57th)	Acting Out (Al Sens); Augusta Makes Herself Beautiful (Csaba Varga); A Black and White Film (Stanislav Sokolov); Boop-Beep (Howard Beckerman); The Breath of Seth (Melinda Littlejohn); Brushstrokes (Sylvie Fefer); Cameleon (Stefan Anastusin); Conny (Ivan J. Rado); Curious George (John Matthews); The Impossible Dream (Tina Jorgensen); Jumping (Osamu Tezuka); J.C. Oscar and the Yolk; Life Is Flashing Before My Eyes (Vince Collins); Anijam (Marv Newland); Boomtown (Bill Plympton); Hello (Faith Hubley); High Fidelity (Robert Abel); Footlights and Flatfeet (Tom Whelan and Mark Jiett); Fish and Chips (Susanne and Johan Hagelback); The Magic Egg (Eddie Garrick); Marxians (Zoran Jovanović); Pies (Sheldon CohenNFB); Queen Victoria and the Indians; My Little Pony (Tom Griffen and Joe Bacall); Real Inside (John Weldon (animator) and David Vierrail, NFB); Rectangle & Rectangles (NFB); Robots (Cathy Karol); The Romance of Betty Boop (Bill Melendez); Silas Marner (Nicole Gouve); Spotting A Cow (Paul Driessen); Taking a Line for a Walk: A Homage to the Work of Paul Klee (Leslie Keen); The White Gazelle (Anthony Laudati); You Can't Teach an Old Dog New Tricks (Barrie Nelson and June Foray)	
1986 (59th)	All About The Statue of Liberty (Jimmy Picker); Debts; Housecats (Peg McClure); Popol Vuh: The Maya Creation Myth; Lucretia (NFB); Snookles (Juilet Stroud); Set in Motion (Jane Aaron); Tables of Content (Wendy Tilby); The Characters (Evert de Beijer); Cityshape (Carol Blum); Bartakiada (Oldrich Haberle); Broken Down Film (Tezuka); Elephantrio (NFB); Every Dog's Guide to Complete Home Safety (NFB); The Expanding Universe; Get A Job (NFB); I Was A Thanksgiving Turkey (John Schnall); John Lennon Sketchbook (John Canemaker); Kaspar (Stefan Anastasiu); No One Turns Away from the Camera (Kevin Dole); Time of the Angels (Faith Hubley); Where Did I Come From? (Ian Mackenzie)	

=== 2005 ===
Film (studio)	Reference
Daffy Duck for President (Warner Bros)	

=== 2009-present ===
Year	Film (studio)	Reference
2009 (82nd)	The Cat Piano (The People's Republic of Animation); The Kinematograph (Platige Image); Partly Cloudy (Pixar); Runaway (NFB); Varieté (il Luster Films)	
2010 (83rd)	The Cow Who Wanted to Be a Hamburger (Plympton); Coyote Falls (WB); Sensology (Michel Gagné); Le silence sous l'écorce (Joanna Lurie); Urs (Moritz Mayerhofer)	
2011 (84th)	A Shadow of Blue (Carlos Lascano); The Ballad of Nessie (Disney); Birdboy (Abrikim Studio); Chopin’s Drawings (BreakThru Films); Correspondence (Pratt); Daisy Cutter (Silverspace); Enrique Wrecks the World (David Chai); Ente Tod Und Tulipe (Trickstudio); The External World (David OReilly); Fat Hamster (BreakThru Films); The Gloaming (Autour De Minuit); Grandpa Looked Like William Powell (David Levy); Hamster Heaven (BreakThru Films); I Tawt I Taw a Puddy Tat (WB); I Was the Child of Holocaust Survivors (NFB); Ingrid Pitt: Beyond the Forest (Kevin Sean Michaels); Kahanikar (National Film and Television School); The Lost Town of Switez (Human Ark); Little Postman (BreakThru Films); Luminaris (Juan Pablo Zaramella); Luna (Rainmaker); The Magic Piano (Martin Clapp); Maska (Sem-ma-for); The Monster of Nix (Rosto); Muybridge's Strings (Kōji Yamamura); My Hometown (Eggplant); Night Island (BreakThru Films); Nullarbor (Alister Lockhart); Papa's Boy (BreakThru Films); Paths of Hate (Platige Image); The Renter (CalArts); Romance (NFB & Studio GDS); El Salón México (Paul Glickman and Tamarind King); The Smurfs: A Christmas Carol (Sony Pictures Animation); Specky Four-Eyes (Vivement Lundi); Spirits of the Piano (BreakThru Films); The Tannery (Axis Animation); Thank You (Cartoon Network & Frederator); The Vermeers (Tal S. Shamir); Vincenta (Samuel Orti Marti)	
2012 (85th)	Combustible (Katsuhiro Otomo); Dripped (Léo Verrier); The Eagleman Stag (Michael Please); The Fall of the House of Usher (Raul Garcia); Tram (Pavlatova)	
2013 (86th)	Gloria Victoria (NFB); Hollow Land (Uri Kranot, Michelle Kranot); The Missing Scarf (Jamie Hogan); Requiem for Romance (Jonathan Ng); Subconscious Password (NFB)	
2014 (87th)	Coda (Alan Holly); Duet (Glen Keane); Footprints (Bill Plympton); The Numberlys (Brandon Oldenburg, William Joyce); Symphony No. 42 (Réka Bucsi)	
2015 (88th)	Carface (NFB); If I Was God (NFB); Love in the Time of March Madness (Melissa Johnson and Robertino Zambrano); My Home (Phuong Mai Nguyen); An Object at Rest (California Institute of the Arts)	
2016 (89th)	Happy End (Film and TV School of the Academy of Performing Arts in Prague); The Head Vanishes (NFB); Inner Workings (Disney); Once Upon a Line (Alicja Jasina); Sous Tes Doigts (Under Your Fingers) (Marie-Christine Courtès)	
2017 (90th)	Cradle (University of Southern California); Everything (David OReilly); Fox and the Whale (Robin Joseph and Kim Leow); In a Heartbeat (Ringling College of Art and Design); Life Smartphone (Central Academy of Fine Arts); Lost Property Office (Daniel Agdag)	
2018 (91st)	Age of Sail (John Kahrs); Bilby (DreamWorks); Bird Karma (DreamWorks); Lost & Found (Wabi Sabi Studios); Pepe le Morse (Grandpa Walrus) (Caïmans Productions)	
2019 (92nd)	Falafel Cart (Abdullah Al-Wazzan); He Can't Live Without Cosmos (Konstantin Bronzit); Hors Piste (l'Ecole des Nouvelles Images); Mind My Mind (Floor Adams); The Physics of Sorrow (NFB); Uncle Thomas: Accounting for the Days (NFB)	
2020 (93rd)	Kapaemahu (Hinaleimoana Wong-Kalu, Dean Hamer, Joe Wilson); Out (Pixar); The Snail and the Whale (Magic Light Pictures); To: Gerard (DreamWorks); Traces (Sophie Tavert Macian, Hugo Frassetto)	
2021 (94th)	Angakusajaujuq: The Shaman's Apprentice (Zacharias Kunuk); Bad Seeds (NFB); Flowing Home (NFB); Mum Is Pouring Rain (Hugo de Faucompret); The Musician (Reza Riahi, Estrella Productions); Namoo (Erick Oh); Only a Child (Simone Giampaolo); Souvenir Souvenir (Bastien Dubois); Step into the River (Weijia Ma); Us Again (Disney)	
2022 (95th)	Black Slide (Uri Lotan); The Debutante (Elizabeth Hobbs); The Garbage Man (Laura Gonçalves); It's Nice In Here (Robert-Jonathan Koeyers); More Than I Want to Remember (Amy Bench); New Moon (Jérémie Balais, Jeffig Le Bars); Passenger (Juan Pablo Zaramella); Save Ralph (Spencer Susser); Sierra (Sander Joon); Steakhouse (Špela Čadež)	
2023 (96th)	27 (Flóra Anna Buda); Boom (École des Nouvelles Images); Eeva (Lucija Mrzljak and Morten Tšinakov); Humo (Smoke) (Rita Basulto); I’m Hip (John Musker); A Kind of Testament (Stephen Vuillemin); Koerkorter (Dog Apartment); Once Upon a Studio (Disney); Pete (Bret Parker); Wild Summon (Karni Arieli)	
2024 (97th)	A Bear Named Wojtek (Iain Gardner); Bottle George (Daisuke Tsutsumi); A Crab in the Pool (Alexandra Myotte & Jean-Sébastien Hamel); Goodbye My World (école MoPA); Maybe Elephants (Torill Kove/NFB); ME (Don Hertzfeldt); Origami (Kei Kanamori/Digital Hollywood University); Percebes (Alexandra Ramires & Laura Gonçalves); The 21 (Tod Polson); The Wild-Tempered Clavier (Anna Samo)	
2025 (98th)	Autokar (Sylwia Szkiladz); Cardboard (Locksmith Animation/DNEG); Éiru (Cartoon Saloon); Hurikán (Jan Saska); I Died in Irpin (Anastasiia Falileieva); The Night Boots (Pierre-Luc Granjon); Playing God (Matteo Burani); The Quinta's Ghost (James A. Castillo); The Shyness of Trees; Snow Bear (Aaron Blaise)	

== See also ==
- Submissions for Best Animated Feature Academy Award
