= 2024 Annecy International Animation Film Festival =

2024 film festival

- Official poster by Regina Pessoa
- Opening film: The Most Precious of Cargoes
- Location: Annecy, France
- Awards: Cristal for Best Feature Film: Memoir of a Snail; Contrechamp Grand Prix: Sultana's Dream
- Festival date: 9–15 June 2024

Annecy International Animation Film Festival
- 2025 2023

The 2024 Annecy International Animation Film Festival took place from 9 to 15 June 2024, in Annecy, France. Michel Hazanavicius' drama film The Most Precious of Cargoes, adapted from the novel of the same name by Jean-Claude Grumberg, served as the opening film.

Australian film Memoir of a Snail, directed by Adam Elliot, won the Cristal Award for Best Feature Film, while Spanish film Sultana's Dream, directed by Isabel Herguera, won the Contrechamp Grand Prix. Latvian film Flow won four awards including two from the Jury and Audience categories.

== Background ==
The complete lineup was announced on 25 April 2024, also announcing the special presentations of several upcoming big studio films such as Inside Out 2, Moana 2 and Despicable Me 4, as well as previews and/or early looks for films including Transformers One, The Wild Robot, Zack Snyder's Twilight of the Gods, and Wallace & Gromit: Vengeance Most Fowl.

A new non-competitive section was revealed titled Annecy Presents, with the intention of screening "never-before seen films of all genres and background for all audiences".

Four honored special guests were announced: British filmmaker Terry Gilliam received the Festival Honorary Cristal for his lifetime achievements, French director and actor Alain Chabat presented his animated series Astérix and Obélix, The Big Fight, and both Portuguese animator Regina Pessoa and American filmmaker Wes Anderson presented masterclasses at the festival.

Pessoa was selected as this edition's signal artist as a part of the edition's spotlight on Portuguese animation and dance. She also designed the official poster for this edition. According to her, the poster depicts a swimmer and dancer who represents "the balance between grace and power in the face of adversity", also taking inspiration from the Portuguese music genre Fado as well as the Lake Annecy waters and the Portuguese ocean.

== Sections ==
The films selected for each section are as follows:

=== Official competition ===
==== Feature films ====
English title	Original title	Director(s)	Production countrie(s)
Into the Wonderwoods	Angelo, dand la Forêt Mystérieuse	Vincent Paronnaud, Alexis Ducord	France, Luxembourg
Flow		Gints Zilbalodis	Latvia, Belgium, France
Ghost Cat Anzu	化け猫あんずちゃん	Yôko Kuno, Nobuhiro Yamashita	Japan
The Colors Within	きみの色	Naoko Yamada	Japan
The Most Precious of Cargoes (opening film)	La Plus Précieuse des marchandises	Michel Hazanavicius	France, Belgium
Totto-Chan: The Little Girl at the Window	窓ぎわのトットちゃん	Shinnouske Yakuwa	Japan
Memoir of a Snail		Adam Elliot	Australia
Rock Bottom		María Trénor	Spain, Poland
Savages	Sauvages!	Claude Barras	Switzerland, France, Belgium
A Boat in the Garden	Slocum et moi	Jean-Baptiste Laguionie	Luxembourg, France
The Imaginary	屋根裏のラジャー	Yoshiyuki Momose	Japan
The Storm	大雨	Yang Zhigang	China

==== Feature Films – Contrechamp ====
English title	Original title	Director(s)	Production countrie(s)
Sultana's Dream	El sueño de la sultana	Isabel Herguera	Spain, Germany
Gill		Jae-Hoon Ahn	South Korea
The Missing	Iti Mapukpukaw	Carl Joseph Papa	Philippines
Living Large		Kristina Dufková	Czech Republic, Slovakia, France
Black Butterflies	Mariposas negras	David Baute	Spain, Panama
Our Crazy Love		Nelson Botter Jr.	Brazil
Pelikan Blue		László Csáki	Hungary
Journey of Shadows	Reise der Schatten	Yves Netzhammer	Switzerland
Sunburnt Unicorn		Nick Johnson	Canada
Birth of Kitarō: The Mystery of GeGeGe	鬼太郎誕生 ゲゲゲの謎	Gō Koga	Japan
The Glassworker	شیشہ گر	Usman Riaz	Pakistan

==== Short films ====
English title	Original title	Director(s)	Production countrie(s)
[S]		Mario Radev	United Kingdom
Aquatic	Abzi	Shiva Sadegh Asadi	Iran
Beautiful Men		Nicolas Keppens	Belgium, France, Netherlands
Circle		Kihyun Kim	South Korea
In the Shadow of the Cypress	Dar Saaye Sarv	Hossein Molayemi, Shirin Sohani	Iran
Drizzle in Johnson		Ivan Li	Canada
When It Comes (It Will Have Your Eyes)	Etorriko da (eta zure begiak izango ditu)	Izibene Oñaderra Aramendi	Spain
Flower Show		Elli Vuorinen	Finland
Free the Chickens		Matús Vizár	Slovakia, Czech Republic
Gina Kamentsky's Pinocchio in 70MM		Gina Kamentsky	United States
Hurikán		Jan Saska	Czech Republic, France, Slovakia, Bosnia and Herzegovina
In Perpetuum		Birute Sodeikaite	Canada
Joko		Izabela Plucinska	Poland, Germany, Czech Republic
Kaminhu		Marie Viellevie	France
Maybe Elephants	Kanskje det var elefanter	Torill Kove	Norway, Canada
Kawauso		Akihito Izuhara	Japan
La Voix des Sirènes		Gianluigi Toccafondo	France, Italy
The Painting	Le tableau	Michèle Lemieux	Canada
Margarethe 89		Lucas Malbrun	France
Miserable Miracle		Ryo Orikasa	France, Canada, Japan
Mont Noir		Jean-Baptiste Peltier, Erika Haglund	France, Portugal
Moral Support		Vuk Jevremovic	Germany, Croatia
Butterfly	Papillon	Florence Miailhe	France
Percebes		Alexandra Ramires, Laura Gonçalves	Portugal, France
Plus douce est la nuit		Fabienne Wagenaar	France
Horse Portrait	Portret konia	Witold Giersz	Poland
Preoperational Model		Philip Ullman	Netherlands
Return to Hairy Hill	Retour à Hairy Hill	Daniel Gies	Canada
Shoes and Hooves		Viktória Traub	Hungary
Tennis, Oranges		Sean Pecknold	United States
The Car That Came Back from the Sea		Jadwiga Kowalska	Switzerland

==== Television Films ====
English title	Original title	Director(s)	Production countrie(s)
I Adopt You!: "Pedro and Kuky"	¡Yo te adopto!: "Pedro y Kuky"	Rosario Carlino, Itati Romero	Argentina
A Bear Named Wojtek		Iain Gardener	United Kingdom, Poland
Bad Bad Belgium: "Uranium"		Jasper Declercq, Jonas Wellens, Wouter Medaer	Belgium
Behind the Beats: "Salsa Meets R&B: A Story of Latin Pop (featuring Kali Uchis)"		Baptiste Jacquemet	France
Blue Eye Samurai: "The Tale of the Ronin and the Bride"		Michael Green	United States
Clawlolo: "Gramophone"		Alexey Alekseev	Cyprus
In the Know: "Yogurt Week"		Brandon Gardner, Zach Woods	United States
My Life in Versailles: "Versailles Ghost"	La vie de château: "Le fantôme de Versailles"	Clémence Madeleine-Perdrillat, Nathaniel H'Limi	France
Lola and the Sound Piano	Lola et le Piano à bruits	Augusto Zanovello	France, Poland, Switzerland
Mike Judge's Beavis & Butt-Head: "Sleepover"		Geoffrey Johnson	United States
Alice's Diary: "The No Sleep Over"	O diário de Alice	Diogo Viegas	Portugal
Our Summer of Freedom: "The Slap"	Petite Casbah: "La gifle"	Antoine Colomb	France, Belgium
Pip and Posy Let's Learn: "All About Butterflies"		Leigh Fieldhouse, Joanna Hepworth	United Kingdom
Pokémon Concierge: "What's on Your Mind, Psyduck?"	ポケモンコンシェルジュ: "どう？いま楽しい？"	Ogawa Iku	Japan
Smiling Friends: "A Allan Adventure"		Zach Hadel, Michael Cusack	Australia
Snoopy Presents: Welcome Home, Franklin		Raymond S. Persi	United States
Tabby McTat		Sarah Scrimgeour, Jac Hamman	United Kingdom
The EKSPATS: "We're Going to Africa"		Ron Myrick, Adebisi Adetayo, Mbuotidem Johnson	Nigeria
The Mouse Mansion, Sam & Julia: "The Story with no End"		Régis Vidal	France
The Very Small Creatures: "The Farm"		Lucy Izzard	United Kingdom
Un air de Glissant: "Les yeux la voix"		Olivier Patté	France
The Drifting Guitar		Sophie Roze	France, Switzerland
Wow Lisa: "Seashells"	Wow Lisa: "Conchitas"	María Elisa Soto Aguilar, Antonia Herrera	Chile
Zom 100: Bucket List of the Dead: "Akira of the Dead"	ゾン100 ～ゾンビになるまでにしたい100のこと～: "アキラオブザデッド"	Kazuki Kawagoe	Japan

==== Commissioned Films ====
Title	Director(s)	Production countrie(s)
"Federal Owl Commission": 23rd OIAF Signal Film	Matthew Rankin	Canada
14th Anibar Animation Festival Trailer: "Love"	Sander Joon	Estonia
15 Years of Studio Eeksaurus: "The Seed"	Suresh Eriyat	India
Adult Swim: "The Cute Cat ID"	Silvia Prietov	Colombia
Adult Swim's Off the Air: "Magic Buzz"	Julia Müller	Germany
Alzheimer's Research UK: "Change the Ending"	AGAINSTALLODDS	United Kingdom
Ashnikko: "Worms"	Raman Djafari	Germany
Belong: "More of the Good Stuff"	Paulo Garcia	Brazil
Célestin: "Ma mère"	Chaïtane Conversat	France
Chantelouve	Regina Pessoa	France, Portugal
Chien Méchant: "Étoile filante"	Kelzang Revach	France
Chinese Man ft. Stogie T, KT Gorique & FP: "Too Late"	Victor Haegelin	France
DOA 2023	John Christian Ferner Apalnes	Norway
Blood Between the Legs	Frederick Venet	France, Georgia
Federal Ministry - BMK: "The Madhouse"	Nella Addy, Rogan Van Den Berg, Ross Cooper	United Kingdom
GODS ft. NewJeans: "Worlds 2023 Anthem – League of Legends"	Marie Hyon, Hans-Christoph Schultheiss	United States
Hulu Ids – Season 2: "Exquisite Corpse"	Simón Wilches Castro	United States
INTERFILM 39 "Festival Trailer"	Anne Isensee	Germany
Just Dance 2024: "Rapper's Delight"	Stéphane Berla	France
ACLU Arizona's "I Had Nothing"	Elyse Kelly	United States
María Morfeo: "Fish"	Gabriela Fernanda Orozco	Mexico
Naraka: Bladepoint – Asian Games	Paulo Garcia	Brazil
Pictoplasma "Opener 2023"	Will Anderson	United Kingdom
Playgrounds In Motion "2023 Opening Titles"	Erwin Van Der Ijssel	Netherlands
Sharjah Book Authority: "Best Seller"	Tariq Ali, Maged Nassar	Egypt
Shortcuts: "Rivière sans retour"	David Stora	France
Siamés: "My Way"	Jesica Nianchi	Argentina
StopTrik 2023 "Trailer"	Titouan Tillier	Slovenia
TED-Ed: "Does Planting Trees Actually Cool the Planet?"	Thomas Johnson Volda, Ivana Bonjak Volda	United States, Croatia
TED-Ed: "How Did South African Apartheid Happen, and How Did It Finally End?"	Aya Marzouk	United States, South Africa, Egypt
The Lords of Water: "Launch Film"	Ingi Erlingsson, Stefan Falconer, Charles Bigeast	United Kingdom
Valsa la vista!	Selma Maillard	France
Verified: Xika vs the Disinformation	Mariano Fernandez Russo	Argentina
We Campaign Because They Can't	Dane Winn	United Kingdom
World Economic Forum: "Dance to Live"	World Economic Forum Creative Team	Switzerland
World Wide Fund for Nature: "Up in Smoke"	Yannis Konstantinidis	United Kingdom

==== VR Works ====
English title	Original title	Director(s)	Production countrie(s)
Flow		Adriaan Lokman	France
Gargoyle Doyle		Ethan Shaftel	United States, Austria, Argentina
Nana Lou	Mamie Lou	Isabelle Andreani	France, Luxembourg
My Inner Ear Quartet		Koji Yamamura	Japan
Oto's Planet		Gwenaël François	Luxembourg, Canada, France
Sports of Light		Adam Weingrod	Israel, Canada
Stay Alive, My Son		Victoria Bousis	Greece, United States
My Imaginary Friend		Steye Hallema	Netherlands, Belgium
Emperor		Marion Burger, Ilan Cohen	France, Germany
The Age of the Monster	Le temps du monstre	Benjamin Nuel	France

==== Off-Limits ====
English title	Original title	Director(s)	Production countrie(s)
Families' Albums	Albums de familles	Moïa Jobin-Paré	Canada
Beyond	Au-delà	Patrick Bokanowski	France
Corpus and the Wandering		Jo Roy	Canada
Crash-huang.xi.hu.xi		Dale Zhou, Hongxiang Zhou	United States
The Great Tree Piece	Das große Baumstück	Claudia Larcher	Austria
Data Flesh		Felipe Elgueta	Chile
Glass House		Boris Labbé	France
Grain Cloud Atmosphere		Martin Moolhuijsen	Italy, Germany
Lines		Martin Schmidt	Germany
Entropic Memory	Mémoire entropique	Nicolas Brault	Canada
O/S		Max Hattler	Germany, Hong Kong
Acoustic Shadows	Ombres acoustiques	Patrick Bergeron	Canada

==== Perspectives ====
English title	Original title	Director(s)	Production countrie(s)
The Girl and the Pot	A Menina e o Pote	Valentina Homem	Brazil
The Change of the Wheel	El cambio de rueda	Begoña Arostegui	Spain
Elene Dariani		Elene Tavadze	Georgia
GIGI		Cynthia Calvi	France
Homesick	Hanina	Yasmin Moll	Egypt
Hey Dad		Weifan Wang	Taiwan
I Died in Irpin		Anastasiia Falileieva	Czech Republic, Slovakia, Ukraine
It Shouldn't Rain Tomorrow		Maria Trigo Teixeira	Portugal, Germany
Last Night		Peter Oti Asamoah	Ghana
Rose Rash	Peun-Hu-Larp	Thanut Rujitanont	Thailand
Pie dan lo		Kim Yip Tong	Mauritius, France
Silent Panorama		Nicolas Piret	Belgium
The Meatseller		Margherita Giusti	Italy
The Wild-Tempered Clavier		Anna Samo	Germany
This Is a Story Without a Plan		Cassie Shao	United States
Underground		Yiannis Christoforou	Greece, Cyprus

==== Young Audiences ====
English title	Original title	Director(s)	Production countrie(s)
Shelter	Abri	Hulie Daravan Chea	France
Hello Summer	Ahoj leto	Martin Smatana, Veronika Zacharová	Slovakia, Czech Republic, France
Basha		Anirban Paul	India
Yuck!	Beurk!	Loïc Espuche	France
Baking with Boris	La boulangerie de Boris	Masa Avramovic	France, Switzerland, Croatia
Head in the Clouds	Tête en l'air	Rémi Durin	France
Tuu-Tuu-Til		Veronica Solomon	Germany
Wing It!		Hendrik Schutte	Netherlands

==== Graduation Films ====
English title	Original title	Director(s)	Production countrie(s)	Institution(s)
7 Missing		Yuval Katz	Israel	Bezalel Academy of Arts and Design
Adiós		Jose Prats	United Kingdom	National Film and Television School
Apartment 203		Mariana Moreno Bernal, Eduardo Poiré Couto	Mexico	SAE Institute Mexico
Ardent Other		Alice Brygo	France	Studio National des Arts Contemporains
Between You and Me		Cameron Kletke	Canada	Emily Carr University of Art and Design
Carrotica		Daniel Sterlin-Altman	Germany	Konrad Wolf Film University of Babelsberg
Claw		Lucas Ferrer, Ayoub Chaibi, Marianne Dautheville, Chloé Ferrus, Thomas Petroni, Melissa Saba, Dylan Sayagh, Alizée Valenzuela, Florian Wagner	France	Ecole Supérieure des Métiers Artistiques
Crow Man		Yohann Abdelnour	Lebanon	Lebanese Academy of Fine Arts
Echoes		Robinson Drossos	France	École nationale supérieure des arts décoratifs
Hic svnt dracones		Justin Fayard	France	École nationale supérieure des arts décoratifs
Echoes of Grief		Verena Repar	Austria	University of Applied Arts Vienna
Noodles au Naturel	Frite sans maillot	Matteo Salanave Piazza	France	La Poudrière Ecole du Film d'Animation
Girls' Hair		Klara Thafvelin	Sweden	Stockholm University of the Arts
Humantis		Paris Baillie	United States	California Institute of the Arts
I Wanna Be a Statue		Harvey Auerbach-Dunn	United Kingdom	Royal College of Art
Minus Plus Multiply		Chu-Chieh Lee	United Kingdom	Royal College of Art
Is This Now the Time I Should Let You Go?		Yi-Chin Tsai	Finland, Taiwan, Belgium, Portugal	RE:Anima, European Joint Master in Animation, Aalto University, LUCA School of Arts, Universidade Lusófona
To Be a Seed	Ser semilla	Julia Granillo Tostado	Portugal, Belgium, Finland, Mexico	RE:Anima, European Joint Master in Animation, Aalto University, LUCA School of Arts, Universidade Lusófona
Maatitel		Govinda Sao	India	National Institute of Design
Mary: Through Glass		Wyatt Carson	United States	Maryland Institute College of Art
Moving Mountains		Jessica Poon	Germany	Academy of Media Arts Cologne
Piiritajad		Ada Napiórkowski	Estonia	Estonian Academy of Arts
The Last Visit		Keawalee Warutkomain	Estonia	Estonian Academy of Arts
Weeds	Plevel	Pola Kazak	Czech Republic	Film School in Písek
Rising Above	Pres strepy	Natálie Durchánková	France	Film and TV School of the Academy of Performing Arts in Prague
Windows from the South	Prozori s južne strane	Eugen Bilankov	Croatia	Academy of Fine Arts
Pubert Jimbob		Quirijin Dees	Belgium	Royal Academy of Fine Arts
Return		Lindon Chen	Japan	Tama Art University
Yapolaponky		Masataka Kihara	Japan	Tama Art University
Bloodletting	Sangre petrolera	Alejandro Jiménez Mora	Costa Rica	Universidad Veritas
Searching for the 5th Direction		Matthias Schüpbach	Switzerland	Lucerne School of Art and Design
Sheep Out		Zofia Klamka	Poland	Academy of Fine Arts, Warsaw
Stale Smoke	Tabac froid	Arthur Jamain	France	Atelier de Sèvres
Show		Jagoda Czarnowska	Poland	Jan Matejko Academy of Fine Arts
The Bubby Bear Show		Thavin Vongpatanasin	United States	Ringling College of Art and Design
The Monster		Ruby Yang, Bomin Kim	South Korea	Chungkang College of Cultural Industries
The Time Botanist		Glenn Paul-Parvenu	France	Institut Sainte-Geneviève
To the Brink		Hugo Docking	United Kingdom	University of the West of England
Waterpark		Ross Malo	Ireland	Dún Laoghaire Institute of Art, Design and Technology, National Film School of Ireland
You Are the Truck and I Am the Deer		Max Ferguson	Belgium	LUCA School of Arts

=== Out of competition ===
==== Annecy Presents ====
English title	Original title	Director(s)	Production countrie(s)
Give It All	がんばっていきまっしょい	Yūhei Sakuragi	Japan
Buffalo Kids		Juan "Galo" Galocha, Pedro Solís	Spain
Diplodocus		Wojtek Wawszczyk	Poland, Czech Republic, Slovakia
Extinction		Behnoud Nekooei	Malaysia
Fox and Hare Save the Forest	Vos & Haas redden het bos	Mascha Halberstad	Netherlands, Luxembourg, Belgium
Animal Tales of Christmas Magic	Le Grand Noël des animaux	Camille Alméras, Caroline Attia Larivière, Ceylan Beyoglu, Haruna Kishi, Natalia Chernishova, Olesya Shchukina	France, Germany
Detective Conan: The Million-dollar Pentagram	名探偵コナン 100万ドルの五稜星	Chika Nagaoka	Japan
Out of the Nest		Arturo Hernandez, Andrew Gordon	Thailand, China
Sand Land		Yoshihis Yokoshima	Japan
The Garfield Movie		Mark Dindal	United States
The Sloth Lane		Tania Vincent, Ricard Cussó	Australia
The Worlds Divide		Denver Jackson	Canada
Panda Bear in Africa		Richard Claus, Karsten Kiilerich	France, Germany, Netherlands, Denmark
Flavors of Iraq	Le parfum d'Irak	Léonard Cohen	France
Look Back	ルックバック	Kiyotaka Oshiyama	Japan
Blue Lock: Episode Nagi	ブルーロック-EPISODE 凪-	Shunsuke Ishikawa	Japan

==== Screening Events ====
English title	Original title	Director(s)	Production countrie(s)
Chang'an	长安三万里	Xie Junwei, Zou Jing	China
Despicable Me 4		Chris Renaud	United States
Silex and the City		Jean-Paul Guigue, Julien Berjeaut	France, Belgium
The Wild Robot		Chris Sanders	United States
Transformers One		Josh Cooley	United States
Ultraman: Rising	ウルトラマン: ライジング	Shannon Tindle	Japan
Inside Out 2		Kelsey Mann	United States
Moana 2		David Derrick Jr.	United States
The Day the Earth Blew Up: A Looney Tunes Movie		Peter Browngardt	United States
Next on Netflix Animation: From Twilight of the Gods to Wallace & Gromit			United States
Astérix and Obélix, The Big Fight	Astérix et Obélix, le combat des chefs	Alain Chabat, Fabrice Joubert	France
Creature Commandos			United States
The Amazing World of Gumball		Ben Bocquelet	United Kingdom
The Lord of the Rings: The War of the Rohirrim		Kenji Kamiyama	United States, Japan, New Zealand

==== Annecy Classics ====
English title	Original title	Director(s)	Production countrie(s)
History, Mystery, Odyssey: 6 Portland Animators (2023)		Martin Cooper	United Kingdom
Scratches of Life: The Art of Pierre Hébert (2024)	Graver l'homme : arrêt sur Pierre Hébert	Loïc Darses	Canada
Coraline (2009)		Henry Selick	United States
Smaragdin (1960)		Jean Letarte	Canada
You Ought to Be in Pictures (1940)		Friz Freleng	United States
Duck Amuck (1953)		Chuck Jones	United States
Old Orchard Beach P.Q. (1981)		Michèle Cournoyer	Canada
Nice Day in the Country (1988)		Christopher Hinton	Canada
Kidnappé (1988)		Thomas Corriveau	Canada
Teléphone (1985)		Luce Roy	Canada
Little Rural Riding Hood (1949)		Tex Avery	United States
One Froggy Evening (1955)		Chuck Jones	United States
A Wild Hare (1940)		Tex Avery	United States
Marie-coquette qui a ni chaud ni frette (1976)		Estelle Lebel, Mitsu Daudelin, Rachel Saint-Pierre	Canada
Objets perdus (1990)		Michel Gelinas, Michel Degagne	Canada
Solid Serenade (1946)		William Hanna, Joseph Barbera	United States
Gumball (2008)		Ben Bocquelet	United Kingdom
The Time Thing (2013)		Rebecca Sugar	United States
The All-nimal (2023)		Nick Edwards	United States
Pourquoi l'Écran d'épingles? (2024)		Brice Vincent	France
Dexter's Laboratory: Changes (1995)		Genndy Tartakovsky	United States
Servais (2018)		Rudy Pinceel	Belgium

==== Midnight Specials ====
English title	Original title	Director(s)	Production countrie(s)
Giovanna and the Big Peacock		Maria Zilli	Italy
What If It's Not Good?	Ya Güzel Olmazsa?	Haluk Mirac Aykin	Turkey
Spermageddon		Rasmus A. Sivertsen, Tommy Wirkola	Norway
Who Said Death Is Beautiful?		Nakajima Ryo	Japan
Pig That Survived Foot-and-Mouth Disease	구제역에서 살아 돌아온 돼지	Bum-Wook Hur	South Korea
Exorcism Chronicles: The Beginning	퇴마록	Dong-Chul Kim	South Korea
(S)Kids		Les Solis, Louis Solis	Canada
No Flies on Me		Lars Magnus Holmgren	Australia
Martyr's Guidebook		Maks Rzontkowski	Poland
The Personal Issue		Mehdi Alibeygi	Iran
Our Love is Immortal	Askimiz Ölümsüzdür	Ender Yildizhan	Turkey
Corn Man Origin Theory		Alexandre Louvenaz	France
Jean-Mi, the Piles Boy	Jean-Mi, le garçon pilotis	Marcel Street	France
The Shortest Relationship in the World		Xiaoxuan Han	China
Stuffed		Louise Labrousse	France
Spooky Loops		Stas Santimov	Ukraine
The Beacher		Nicole Daddona, Adam Wilder	United States
Larry		Takeshi Murata, Christopher Rutledge	United States
Toothless	Sans-dents	Enzo Gérard	France
Living the Dream		Ben Meinhardt	Canada

== Awards ==
The following awards were presented:

=== Feature films ===
- Cristal for Best Feature Film: Memoir of a Snail by Adam Elliot
- Jury Award: Flow by Gints Zilbalodis
- Paul Grimault Award: Totto-Chan: The Little Girl at the Window by Shinnouske Yakuwa
- Contrechamp Grand Prix: Sultana's Dream by Isabel Herguera
- Contrechamp Jury Award: Living Large by Kristina Dufková
- Gan Foundation Award for Distribution: Flow by Gints Zilbalodis
- Audience Award: Flow by Gints Zilbalodis

=== Short films ===
- Cristal for Best Short Film: Percebes by Alexandra Ramires & Laura Gonçalves
- Jury Award: The Car That Came Back from the Sea by Jadwiga Kowalska
- Alexeïeff Parker Award: Beautiful Men by Nicolas Keppens
- Jean-Luc Xiberras Award for a First Film: [S] by Mario Radev
- Off-Limits Award: Glass House by Boris Labbé
- Audience Award: Hurikán by Jan Saska

=== TV and Commissioned Films ===
- Cristal for Best TV Production: The Drifting Guitar by Sophie Roze
- Jury Award for a TV Series: My Life in Versailles: "Versailles Ghost" by Clémence Madeleine-Perdrillat, Nathaniel H'Limi
- Jury Award for a TV Special: Lola et le Piano à bruits by Augusto Zanovello
- Cristal for Best Commissioned Film: Pictoplasma "Opener 2023" by Will Anderson
- Jury Award for a Commissioned Film: TED-Ed: "How Did South African Apartheid Happen, and How Did It Finally End?" by Aya Marzouk
- Audience Award: The Drifting Guitar by Sophie Roze

=== Graduation Films ===
- Cristal for Best Graduation Film: Carrotica by Daniel Sterlin-Altman
- Jury Award: Pubert Jimbob by Quirijin Dees
- Lotte Reiniger Award: Maatitel by Govinda Sao

=== VR ===
- Cristal for Best VR Work: Gargoyle Doyle by Ethan Shaftel

=== Special Prizes ===
- City of Annecy Award: The Meatseller by Margherita Giusti
- André Martin Award for Best French Short Film: Butterfly by Florence Miailhe
- Best Original Music Award for a Short Film: Joko by Izabela Plucinska
- Best Original Music Award for a Feature Film: Flow by Gints Zilbalodis
- Young Audience Award: Hello Summer by Martin Smatana & Veronika Zacharová
- CANAL+ Junior Jury Award: Noodles au Naturel by Matteo Salanave Piazza
- Festivals Connexion Award: Beautiful Men by Nicolas Keppens
- Festivals Connexion VR Award: Emperor by Marion Burger & Ilan Cohen
- France TV Award for a Short Film: The Car That Came Back from the Sea by Jadwiga Kowalska
