= Fabian Driehorst =

German film producer (born 1982)

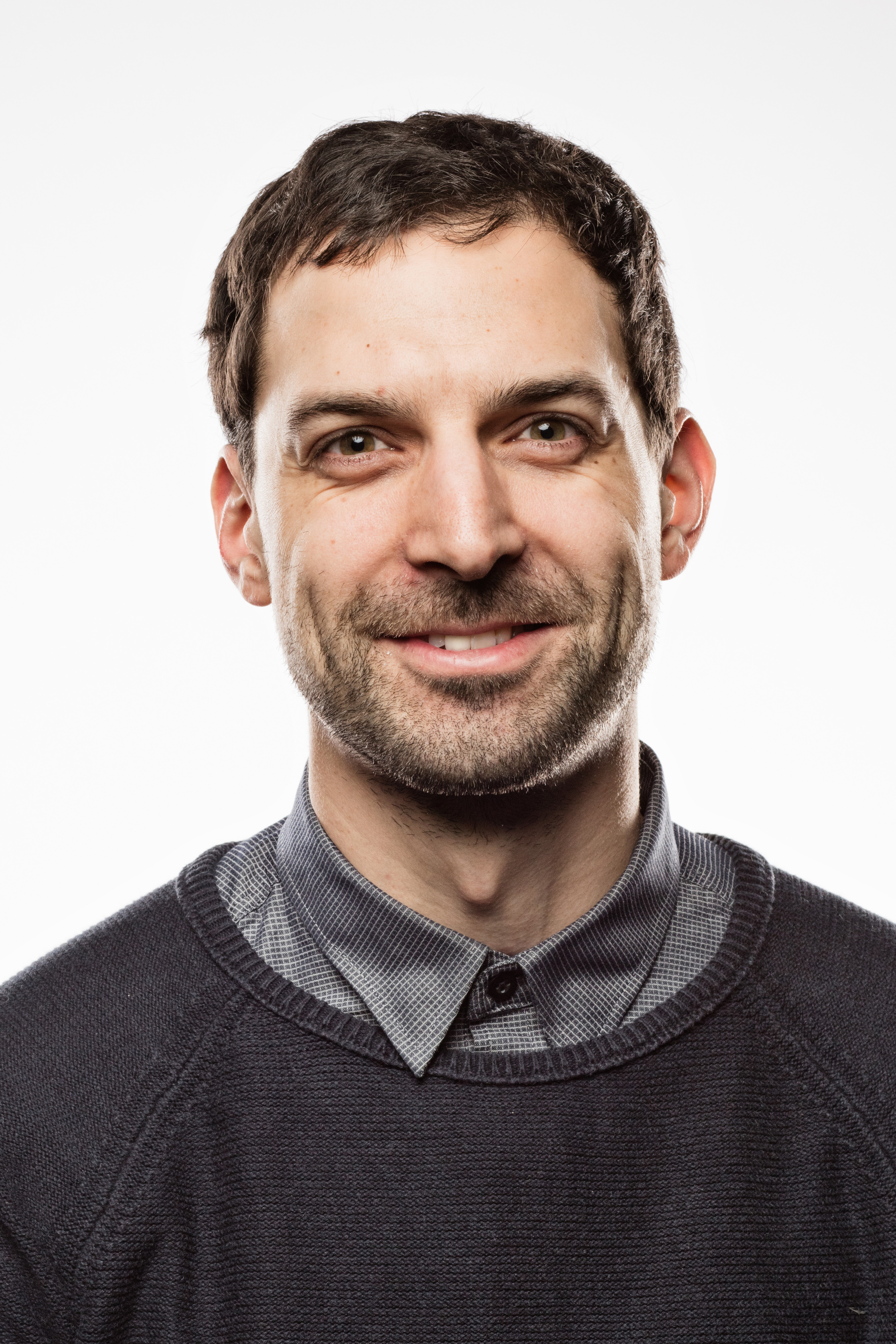
- Born: 17 February 1982 (age 43); Gifhorn, Germany
- Occupation: Film producer
- Known for: Sultana's Dream; Steakhouse; Butterfly Kiss; Night; The Chimney Swift

Fabian Driehorst (born 17 February 1982) is an animation producer from Germany, co-founder of the production studio Fabian&Fred in Hamburg and POM POM Animation in Halle. His filmography is diverse, ranging from short to feature-length films, across various animation techniques and genres. Among his best-known titles are the animated feature Sultana's Dream (2023), which won the Grand Prix in Annecy Contrechamp competition, Anima Brussels, Animafest Zagreb, and was nominated for the European Film Awards for Best Animated Film and Best European Film; as well as critically acclaimed short films such as Steakhouse (2021), which won the Jury Award in Annecy, shortlisted for the 95th Academy Awards and nominated for the 49th Annie Awards; Night (2021); The Chimney Swift (2020) and Butterfly Kiss (2024).

He is a member of Deutsche Filmakademie, European Film Academy and Academy of Motion Picture Arts and Sciences.

== Career ==
After working as a cameraman and editor on documentary films, Driehorst studied at the Academy of Media Arts in Cologne until 2011, aiming to become a writer and director of live-action films. Upon graduating, he co-founded with Frédéric Schuld a studio to further their careers as co-directors, aiming for entertaining and visually playful commissions. Those earned them some recognition, winning advertising awards such as the CLIO Award in silver, NewYorkFestivals Advertising Awards in Bronze, as well as shortlists at several advertising festivals.

At the same time, Driehorst produced the debut films of former fellow students, among them the animated short film Däwit (2015) by David Jansen which premiered in Berlinale 2015. The film marked an almost complete shift of focus from live action to animation, which was further backed when Driehorst and Schuld received the Wim Wenders scholarship in 2014. The scholarship allowed the duo to further pursue their vision and focus each on a specific role, as Driehorst took on producing and Schuld focused on writing and directing.

Driehorst has been involved in several initiatives for the development and support of the animation industry in Germany, as well as promoting German animation on an international level. He has served as chairman in the national animation association AG Animationsfilm (ASIFA Germany) since 2021, focusing on building bridges between the various interest groups within the German film industry, as well as promoting the international exchange of animation associations. In 2019, he was invited to mentor aspiring animation artist Irina Rubina as part of the Cusanuswerk career development program for women. Ever since, he has volunteered as a mentor for members of AG Animationsfilm and at Women in Animation.

== Recognition ==
Since founding Fabian&Fred in 2015, Driehorst has produced over thirty films, in collaboration with more than fifteen different countries, pushing forward cultural exchange and openness towards various perspectives and artistic forms of expression in the field of animation. For his efforts, he has been invited to programs such as "Producer on the Move 2024" in Cannes and "Port of Production Residency 2023".

Among the awards he received are the FFA Branchentiger for the "Most successful production company of short films" in 2023, Producer Award for International Co-Production at Filmfest Hamburg 2023 and the "Documentary Producer Award" at DOKfest Munich 2019. His most critically acclaimed feature film so far is "Sultana's Dream" by Isabel Herguera, which has been shortlisted for the 97th Academy Awards in the category of Best Animated Film.

== Selected filmography ==
- Atemwege (2013) – Director: Elí Roland Sachs
- Däwit (2015) – Director: David Jansen
- À la dérive (2016) – Director: Cyprien Clément-Delmas, co-produced with Spain, France
- Dvalemodus (2017) – Director: Bieke Depoorter, Mattias de Craene, co-produced with Belgium
- The Last Tape (2017) – Director: Igor Kosenko, Cyprien Clément-Delmas
- Carlotta’s Face (2018) – Director: Valentin Riedl, Frédéric Schuld
- Boy of War (2018) – Director: Igor Kosenko, Cyprien Clément-Delmas, co-produced with Czech Republic
- Happiness Machine (2019) – Directors: Rebecca Blöcher, Eni Brandner, Vessy Dantcheva, Elizabeth Hobbs, Susi Jirkuff, Joanna Kozuch, Michelle Kranot, Samantha Moore, Ana Nedeljković, Andrea Schneider, co-produced with Austria, Bulgaria, Denmark, Serbia, Slovakia, Switzerland, United Kingdom
- The Chimney Swift (2020) – Director: Frédéric Schuld
- How My Grandmother Became a Chair (2020) – Director: Nicolas Fattouh, co-produced with Lebanon, Qatar
- Eyes and Horns (2021) – Director: Chaerin, co-produced with South Korea, United States
- Night (2021) – Director: Ahmad Saleh, co-produced with Qatar, Palestine, Jordan
- Steakhouse (2021) – Director: Špela Čadež, co-produced with Slovenia, France
- I'm not afraid! (2022) – Director: Marita Mayer, co-produced with Norway
- Lake Baikal (2023) – Director: Alisi Telengut, co-produced with Canada
- Sultana’s Dream (2023) – Director: Isabel Herguera, co-produced with Spain
- Becoming Air (2024) – Director: Alisi Telengut, Diego Galafassi, co-produced with Canada, Sweden
- Butterfly Kiss (2024) – Director: Zohar Dvir, co-produced with Israel
- Mama Micra (2024) – Director: Rebecca Blöcher, Co-Director: Frédéric Schuld
