= Lucrèce Andreae =

French filmmaker

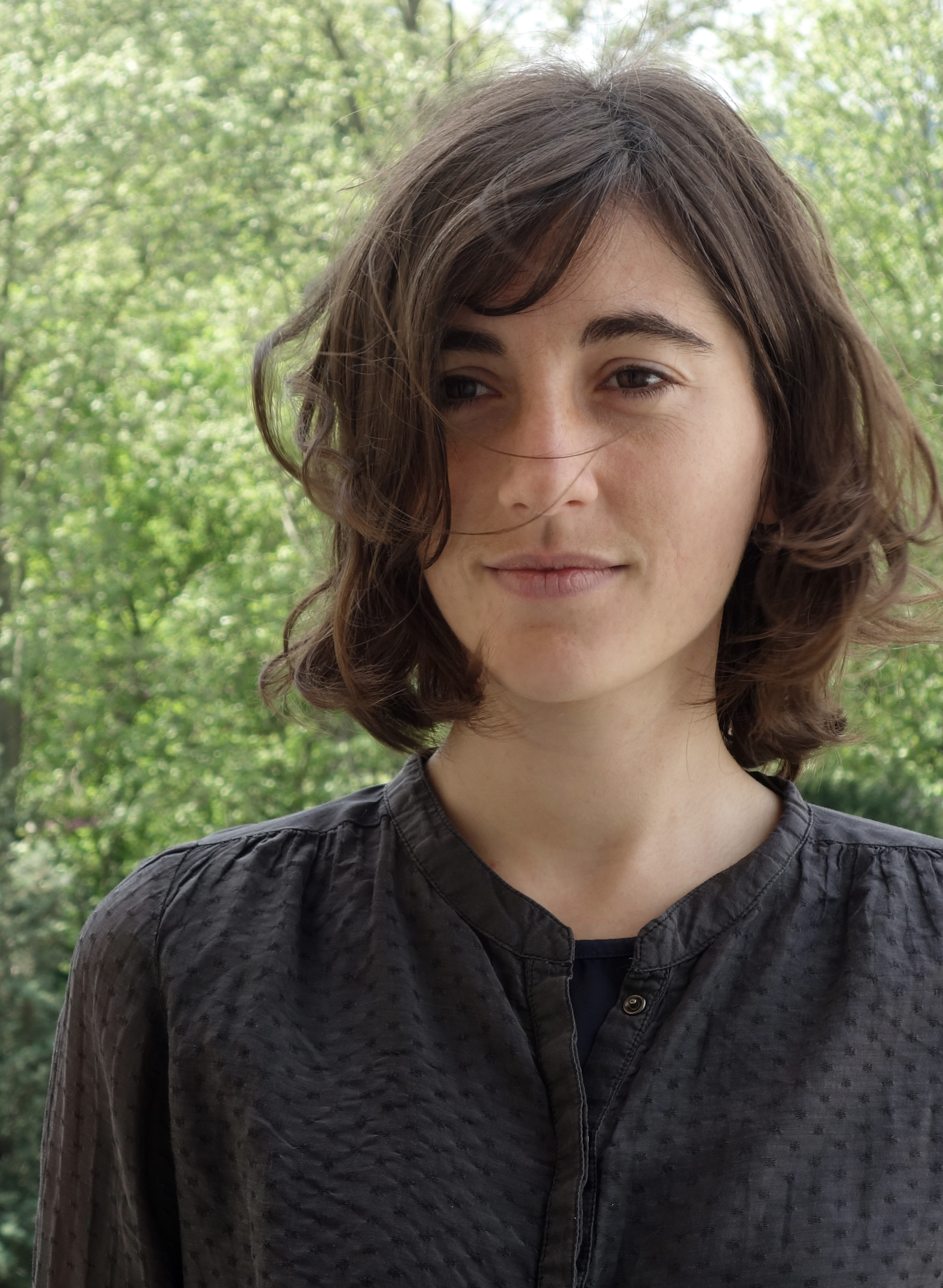
- Born: 1988 (age 37–38); Bordeaux, France
- Occupations: Director, screenwriter and animator
- Notable work: Grandpa Walrus (2017)

Lucrèce Andreae is a French director, screenwriter and animator. She directed the short film Grandpa Walrus which won the César Award for Best Short Film during The Academy of Cinema Arts and Techniques in 2018 and The Audience Award during The Annecy International Animation Film Festival.

== Career ==
Lucrèce Andreae studied animation in Les Gobelins in Paris, France. With other students, she directed the movie Trois petits points which won The Special Jury Prize in The Annecy International Animation Film Festival in 2011. Then, she continued her studies in La Poudrière where she directed with other students the short film "The Words of the Carp". In her movies, Lucrèce Andreae describes madcap characters, absurd situations and everyday tragedies with a lot of softness.

She is currently thinking of making a full-length feature film with her partner Jérémie Moreau, who is a comic book author.

== Awards and nominations ==
In 2018, she won the César Award for Best Short Film in Cannes and The Audience Award in Annecy International Animation Film Festival for her short animated film Grandpa Walrus.

In 2018, the short film is nominated for the Annie Awards in Best Short Animated Category.
