= Annie Award for Best Student Film =

Annual US film award

- Awarded for: Excellence in animated films by students
- Country: United States
- Presented by: ASIFA-Hollywood
- First award: 2012
- Currently held by: A Sparrow's Song (2025)
- Website: annieawards.org

The Annie Award for Best Student Film is an Annie Award given annually to the best animated films by students, the category was first presented at the 40th Annie Awards.

According to ASIFA-Hollywood, in order to be eligible for this award, "the submitted production must be entirely the work of an individual student or team of students from an accredited post-secondary, degree granting program anywhere in the world".

== Winners and nominees ==
=== 2010s ===
| Year | Film | Studient(s) | Alma mater |
2012 (40th)
| 2012 (40th) | Head Over Heels | Timothy Reckart | |
| 2012 (40th) | Can We Be Happy Now | Tahnee Gehm | |
| 2012 (40th) | Defective Detective | Avner Geller & Stevie Lewis | |
| 2012 (40th) | I Am Tom Moody | Ainslie Henderson | |
| 2012 (40th) | Ladies Knight | Joseph Rothenberg | |
| 2012 (40th) | Origin | Jessica Poon | |
| 2012 (40th) | The Ballad of Poisonberry Pete | Adam Campbell, Elizabeth McMahill, Uri Lotan | |
| 2012 (40th) | Tule Lake | Michelle Ikemoto | |
2013 (41st)
| 2013 (41st) | Wedding Cake | Viola Baier (Director), Iris Frisch (Producer) | Filmakademie Baden-Wuerttemberg |
| 2013 (41st) | Chicken or the Egg | Christine Kim, Elaine Wu | Ringling College of Art and Design |
| 2013 (41st) | The Final Straw | Ricky Renna | Ringling College of Art and Design |
| 2013 (41st) | Kellerkind | Julia Ocker (Director), Anna Matacz (Producer) | Filmakademie Baden-Wuerttemberg |
| 2013 (41st) | Miss Todd | Kristina Yee | National Film and Television School |
| 2013 (41st) | Move Mountain | Kirsten Lepore | California Institute of the Arts |
| 2013 (41st) | Trusts & Estates | Jeanette Bonds | California Institute of the Arts |
| 2013 (41st) | Semáforo | Simón Wilches-Castro | University of Southern California |
2014 (42nd)
| 2014 (42nd) | My Big Brother | Jason Rayner | Savannah College of Art and Design |
| 2014 (42nd) | After School | Junyi Xiao | Beihang University / University of Southern California |
| 2014 (42nd) | Dead Over Heels | Jose Matheu | Savannah College of Art and Design |
| 2014 (42nd) | Frog's Legs | Katie Tamboer | Savannah College of Art and Design |
| 2014 (42nd) | El Coyote | Javier Barboza | University of Southern California |
| 2014 (42nd) | Tiny Nomad | Toniko Pantoja | California Institute of the Arts |
2015 (43rd)
| 2015 (43rd) | Ed | Taha Neyestani | Sheridan College |
| 2015 (43rd) | Can I Stay? | Katie Knudson, Onyee Lo, Paige Carter | Ringling College of Art and Design |
| 2015 (43rd) | Dodoba | Yon Hui Lee | California Institute of the Arts |
| 2015 (43rd) | Life Smartphone | Xie Chenglin | China Central Academy of Fine Arts |
| 2015 (43rd) | Mother | Joan Chung, Stephanie Chiew, Ana Gomez, Dadi Wang, David Du, Rui Hao, Matthew Fazari, Nicholas Nason, Jessica Jing, Seeyun Lee | Sheridan College |
| 2015 (43rd) | The Casebook of Nips & Porkington | Melody Wang | Sheridan College |
| 2015 (43rd) | Nice to Meeteor You | Yizhou Li | University of Southern California |
| 2015 (43rd) | Shift | Maria Cecilia Puglesi, Yijun Liu | School of Visual Arts |
2016 (44th)
| 2016 (44th) | Citipati | Andreas Feix (director), Francesco Faranna (producer), Petteri Sainio (music), Michael Boeger (Sounddesign), Natalia Alencar (Texturing) | Filmakademie Baden-Wuerttemberg |
| 2016 (44th) | Fishwitch | Adrienne Dowling | National Film and Television School |
| 2016 (44th) | The Wrong End of the Stick | Terri Matthews | National Film and Television School |
| 2016 (44th) | The Abyss | Liying Huang, Wu Zheng | Communication University of China |
| 2016 (44th) | Twiddly Things | Adara Todd | Middlesex University |
2017 (45th)
| 2017 (45th) | Poles Apart | Paloma Baeza (director), Ser En Low (producer), All Student Crew | National Film and Television School |
| 2017 (45th) | Cradle | Devon Manney | University of Southern California |
| 2017 (45th) | Elsewhere | Junyi Xiao | University of Southern California |
| 2017 (45th) | Godd Night, Everybuds! | Benedikt Hummel (director), Lena Beck (sound design & mix), Andreas Pfeiffer (music), Stefan Michel (producer) | Filmakademie Baden-Wuerttemberg |
| 2017 (45th) | Once a Hero | Xia Li | USC School of Cinematic Arts |
2018 (46th)
| 2018 (46th) | Best Friend | Nicholas Olivieri, Yi Shen, Juliana de Lucca, Varun Nair, David Feliu | Gobelins, l'École de l'image |
| 2018 (46th) | A Blink of an Eye | Kiana Naghshineh | Filmakademie Baden-Württemberg |
| 2018 (46th) | Facing It | Sam Gainsborough | National Film and Television School |
| 2018 (46th) | Hors Piste | Oscar Malet, Léo Brunel, Camille Jalabert, Loris Cavalier | École des Nouvelles Images |
| 2018 (46th) | Sister | Siqi Song | California Institute of the Arts |
2019 (47th)
| 2019 (47th) | The Fox & The Pigeon | Michelle Chua, Aileen Dewhurst, Sharon Gabriella, Viktor Ivanovski, Sang Lee, Tyler Pacana, Sikyung Kevin Sung, Morgan Thompson, Matt Walton, Steven Wang, Chelsea van Tol | Sheridan College |
| 2019 (47th) | Con Fuerza | Andrés Eduardo, Alejandro M. Siegert | Savannah College of Art and Design |
| 2019 (47th) | Gravedad | Matisse Gonzalez, Toufik Abdedaim | Filmakademie Baden-Württemberg |
| 2019 (47th) | Un Diable Dans la Poche | Antoine BONNET, Mathilde LOUBES | Gobelins, l'École de l'image |

=== 2020s ===
| Year | Film | Studient(s) | Alma mater |
2020 (48th)
| 2020 (48th) | La Bestia | Marlijn Van Nuenen, Ram Tamez, Alfredo Gerard Kuttikatt | Gobelins, l'École de l'image |
| 2020 (48th) | 100,000 Acres of Pine | Jennifer Alice Wright | The Animation Workshop |
| 2020 (48th) | Coffin | Yuanqing Cai, Nathan Crabot, Houzhi Huang, Mikolaj Janiw, Mandimby Lebon, Théo Tran Ngoc | Gobelins, l'École de l'image |
| 2020 (48th) | Latitude du Printemps | Sylvain Cuvillier, Chloé Bourdic, Théophile Coursimault, Noémie Halberstam, Maŷlis Mosny, Zijing Ye | Rubika |
| 2020 (48th) | O Black Hole! | Renee Zhan, Jesse Romain | National Film and Television School |
2021 (49th)
| 2021 (49th) | Night of the Living Dread | Ida Melum, director; Danielle Goff, producer | National Film and Television School |
| 2021 (49th) | A Film About a Pudding | Roel Van Beek, director; Jack Pollington, producer | National Film and Television School |
| 2021 (49th) | HOPE | Ryoma Leneuf & Gabriel Martinez, directors; Nicolas Daguin, Guillaume Uchoa, Arthur Bollia, Benjamin Autour; producers | New3dge |
| 2021 (49th) | I Am a Pebble | Yasmine Bresson and Maxime Le Chapelain, directors; Coline Moire, producer | ESMA |
| 2021 (49th) | Slouch | Michael Bohnenstingl, director and producer | Film Academy Baden-Württemberg |
2022 (50th)
| 2022 (50th) | The Soloists | Mehrnaz Abdollahinia, Feben Elias Woldehawariat, Razahk Issaka, Celeste Jamneck, Yi Liu, directors | Gobelins, l'école de l'image |
| 2022 (50th) | Au revoir Jérôme ! | Adam Sillard, Gabrielle Selnet, Chloé Farr, directors | Gobelins, l'école de l'image |
| 2022 (50th) | Birdsong | Michelle Cheng, director and producer | California Institute of the Arts |
| 2022 (50th) | Synchronie Passagère | Julia Le Bras-Juarez, director | Supinfocom Rubika |
| 2022 (50th) | The Most Boring Granny in the Whole World | Damaris Zielke, director; Jiayan Chen, producer | Film Academy Baden-Württemberg |
2023 (51st)
| 2023 (51st) | The Little Poet | Justine King, director and producer | California Institute of the Arts |
| 2023 (51st) | From The Top | Rich Farris, director; Martina Buendia Silva, producer | National Film and Television School |
| 2023 (51st) | Kolaj | Besen Dilek, director and producer | Filamakademie Baden-Württemberg GmbH |
| 2023 (51st) | La quête de l'humain | Mélina Ienco, Lucie Juric, Caroline Leibel, Faustine Merle, and Claire Pellet, student team | Gobelins, l'école de l'image |
| 2023 (51st) | Quem Salva | Laure Devin, Maxime Bourstin, Nathan Medam, Charles Hechinger, and Titouan Jaouen, student team | Supinfocom Rubika |
2024 (52nd)
| 2024 (52nd) | Adiós | José Prats, director; Bernardo Angeletti, producer | National Film and Television School |
| 2024 (52nd) | El Ombligo de la Luna | Sara António, Julia Grupińska, Bokang Koatja, Tian Westraad, Ezequiel Garibay, directors | Gobelins |
| 2024 (52nd) | Pear Garden | Shadab Shayegan, director and producer | Filmakademie Baden-Württemberg GmbH, Animationsinstitut |
| 2024 (52nd) | Polliwog | Julia Skala, director; Max Pollmann, producer | Filmakademie Baden-Württemberg GmbH, Animationsinstitut |
| 2024 (52nd) | Turmspringer | Oscar Bittner, director; Andra Berila, producer | Filmakademie Baden-Württemberg GmbH, Animationsinstitut |
2025 (53rd)
| 2025 (53rd) | A Sparrow's Song | Tobias Eckerlin, director and producer | Filmakademie Baden-Württemberg GmbH, Animationsinstitut |
| 2025 (53rd) | Acrobats | Eloïse Alluyn, Hugo Danet, Anna Despinoy, Antonin Guerci, Alexandre Marzin, Shali Reddy, directors | Gobelins |
| 2025 (53rd) | Jour de vent | Martin Chailloux, Ai Kim Crespin, Elise Golfouse, Chloé Lab, Hugo Taillez, Camille Truding, directors | École des Nouvelles Images |
| 2025 (53rd) | The Undying Pain of Existence | Oscar Jacobson, director; Franz Rügamer, Nadiia Yunatska, producers | Filmakademie Baden-Württemberg GmbH, Animationsinstitut |
| 2025 (53rd) | TRASH | Maxime Crançon, Alexis Le Ral, directors; Robin Delaporte, Romain Fleischer, Mattéo Durand, producers | ESMA |
