= Hybrids (2017 film) =

- Directed by: Florian Brauch, Matthieu Pujol, Kim Tailhades, Yohan Thireau, Romain Thirion
- Produced by: MoPA
- Music by: Vincent Govindin
- Production company: MoPA
- Distributed by: Yummy Films
- Release date: 28 June 2017
- Running time: 6 minutes
- Country: France

Hybrids is an eco-responsible CG animated short film directed in 2017 by 5 French 3D artists during their studies at MoPA, animation school in France. The short received numerous accolades by the CGI & VFX industry. for its outstanding achievement in the Visual effect and CGI work quality, and has won awards in festivals including the COLCOA, the Visual Effects Society, and the Sitges Film Festival, where it received the Oscar Qualifying prize for the Academy Award for Best Animated Short Film at the 91st Academy Awards.

== Plot ==
When marine wildlife has to adapt to the pollution surrounding it, the rules of survival change.

== Awards ==
Since its launch, the film has received numerous accolades, selections and awards around the world, including VES for the Outstanding Visual Effects in a Student Project at the 16th Visual Effects Society Awards in 2018

Year	Presenter/Festival	Award/Category	Status
2017	Sitges	"Grand Jury Prize"	Won
2017	Poitiers Film Festival	2 Awards : "High School Jury Mention" & "Audience Award"	Won
2017	Palm Springs International Animation Festival	"Best Animation"	Nominated
2018	VES	"Outstanding Visual Effects in a Student Project"	Won
2018	COLCOA	""Best Animated Short Hollywood""	Won
2018	Student Academy Awards	International Best Animated Film	Pending
2018	Annecy International Animated Film Festival	"Jury Distinction for Best Student Film"	Won
2018	ITFS 2018 Stuttgart	"International Competition and Young (Student) Animation, AMAZON"	Won
2018	SIGGRAPH	"Best in Show"	Won
2018	Short Shorts Film Festival	"Best Short Animation"	Nominated
2018	Festival du film francophone d'Angoulême	"Valois René Laloux"	Won

The short is part of the world touring screening at The animation Showcase 2018.
