= I Died in Irpin =

2024 film

- Directed by: Anastasiia Falileieva
- Written by: Anastasiia Falileieva
- Produced by: Marcela Vrátilová; Mira Dittrich
- Music by: Petr Marek
- Production companies: MAUR film; Artichoke Film Production; Plastic Bag Films; UA
- Release date: 2024
- Running time: 11 minutes
- Countries: Czech Republic; Slovakia; Ukraine

I Died in Irpin is a 2024 Czech animated short film directed by Anastasiia Falileieva. The 11-minutes film about a young couple fleeing the city of Kyiv during the war premiered at the 2024 Annecy International Animation Film Festival. It was later screened at the Clermont-Ferrand International Short Film Festival where it won the award for the Best Animation.

I Died in Irpin was shortlisted for the 98th Academy Awards in the category of Best Animated Short Film.

== Plot ==
Falileieva and her boyfriend flee the city of Kyiv in the midst of Russia's incursion, and decide to join his family in Irpin. They soon realize that, as the invasion progresses to Irpin, menace is closer than they might think.

== Accolades ==
Since its release, the film has been selected in various festivals around the world:

Year	Award / Festival	Category	Result
2024	Annecy International Animation Film Festival	Official Competition - Perspective	Nominated
2024	Clermont-Ferrand International Short Film Festival	Best Animation Award	Won
2024	Animation Is Film Festival	Official Selection	Nominated
2024	Bucheon International Animation Film Festival	Grand Prize for Short Film	Won
2024	Manchester Animation Festival	Best Short Film	Won
2025	Fest Anča	Best Animated Short	Won
2025	Emile Awards	Best of the Best Short Film	Won
2025	Czech Film Critics' Awards	Best Short Film	Won
2025	Czech Lion Awards	Best Animated Film	Nominated
2025	Sun in a Net Awards	Best Animated Film	Nominated

== See also ==
- List of submissions for the Academy Award for Best Animated Short Film
