= Giovanna Ferrari =

Italian Animator

- Born: Italy
- Occupations: Director; Storyboard Artist; Animator; Head of Story
- Years active: Since 2000
- Known for: Éiru (2025); The Breadwinner (2017); My Father's Dragon (2022)
- Website: giovannaferrari.com

Giovanna Ferrari is an Italian director and animator based in Kilkenny, Ireland. Her notable credits include projects such as Wolfwalkers (2020) and The Breadwinner (2017) both of which were nominated for Best Animated Feature at the Academy Awards. Her short film Éiru (2025) was shortlisted in the Best Animated Short Film for the 98th Academy Awards.

== Career ==
Giovanna Ferrari started her career after graduating from the Centro Sperimentale di Cinematografia in Turin. She worked in several studios in Europe, as an assistant at Achtoons in Bologna, Italy, and at Prima Linea Productions in France. Her work at Studio 352 on the animated feature Song Of The Sea (2014) led her to a lasting work collaboration with the studio Cartoon Saloon based in Ireland.

Ferrari first worked as an animator for Cartoon Saloon in 2014, before taking on the role of storyboard artist and animator on their feature The Breadwinner directed by Nora Twomey which earned her an Emile Award in 2018. She then animated on Tomm Moore and Ross Stewarts' Wolfwalkers. Both films were critically acclaimed and nominated for an Academy Award. In 2018, she started working as Head of Story and animation director on Cartoon Saloon's My Father's Dragon directed by Nora Twomey and coproduced by Netflix.

In 2025, Giovanna Ferrari directed her short film Éiru, following a little girl trying to prove her worth to her clan. The film was produced by Cartoon Saloon director and producer Nora Twomey and is infused with Irish traditional references and folklore. The short film was well received by critics and awarded in various international festivals. It was featured during the theatrical run of Little Amélie or the Character of Rain (2025) in North America.

== Selected filmography ==
- Song Of The Sea (2014)
- The Breadwinner (2016)
- Wolfwalkers (2020)
- My Father's Dragon (2022)
- Éiru (2025)

== Awards and nominations ==
Year	Award	Category	Nominated work	Status
2018	Emile Award	Best Storyboard	The Breadwinner	Won
2023	Irish Animation Award	Best Storyboarding	My Father's Dragon	Won
