= Louis' Shoes =

- Directed by: Marion Philippe, Kayu Leung, Théo Jamin, Jean-Géraud Blanc
- Produced by: Anne Brotot
- Music by: Lolita Del Pino
- Release date: 2020
- Running time: 5 min 16 seconds
- Country: France
- Language: French

Louis' Shoes (French: Les Chaussures de Louis) is a 2020 French animated short film directed by Marion Philippe, Kayu Leung, Théo Jamin and Jean-Géraud Blanc and produced by Anne Brotot with MoPA 3D School. The short has been presented in a number of festivals including in Clermont-Ferrand Festival, DOK Leipzig and won awards in 2021 in Stuttgart Trickfilm International Animated Film Festival, Student Academy Awards, and a Gold Medal in Best Animation International category.

== Plot ==
Louis, 8 1/2 years old, is autistic. He arrives at his new school and is about to introduce himself.

== Accolades ==
Since its launch, the film has been selected in various festivals and academies around the world:

| Year | Ceremony | Award/Category | Status |
|---|---|---|---|
| 2021 | International Festival of Francophone Film in Acadie (FICFA) | FICFA in family (Program 2 (5 to 12 years)) | Nominated |
| 2021 | Cinanima | Student Films | Nominated |
| 2021 | DOK Leipzig | Documentary and Animated Film | Nominated |
| 2021 | FIFF | FIFF Campus | Nominated |
| 2021 | Indie Lisboa International Independent Film Festival | IndieJúnior - The Place of Memories (10+) | Nominated |
| 2021 | Festival du Film court en Plein air de Grenoble | Official Competition | Nominated |
| 2021 | Animafest Zagreb | Children Competition | Nominated |
| 2021 | REGARD - Festival International du court-métrage au Saguenay | Best Young Film | Nominated |
| 2021 | Stuttgart Trickfilm International Animated Film Festival | Special Mention Tricks for Kids Children's Film Competition | Won |
| 2021 | Clermont-Ferrand International Short Film Festival | Young Public | Nominated |
| 2021 | Student Academy Awards | Golden Prize | Won |

The short was part of the world touring screening The Animation Showcase 2021.
