= Rosemary A.D (After Dad) =

2022 American animated short film by Ethan Barrett

- Directed by: Ethan Barrett
- Written by: Ethan Barrett
- Produced by: Tiffany Barrett
- Release date: 2022
- Country: United States

Rosemary A.D. (After Dad) is a 2022 animated short film directed by Ethan Barrett. The film was entirely drawn by hand, with coloured crayons. Since its premiere at the 2022 BFI London Film Festival, Rosemary A.D. (After Dad) has been selected in numerous international film festivals, including the Indy Shorts Film Festival, Animafest Zagreb and the Austin Film Festival. Most recently, the film won its fourth Oscar-qualifying award at Indy Shorts International Film Festival, making it the short film with the most Oscar-qualifying wins in any category this year.

== Plot ==
A father struggling with depression explores the possible outcomes of his newborn daughter's life, should he not be a part of it.

== Production ==
Barrett started to develop the idea for a film about his struggles on mental health shortly before the birth of his daughter, Rosemary. After she was born, he decided to turn these journals into a film.

The film was traditionally animated with crayons on paper. The hand-drawn drawings were shot with a DSLR camera on a tripod and edited using the Adobe Photoshop software. The short also includes short scenes were the stop-motion technique was used.

== Reception ==
Since its release, the film has been selected in various festivals around the world:

Year	Festivals	Award/Category	Status
2022	London Film Festival	Best Short Film	Nominated
2022	St. Louis International Film Festival	Best Animated Short	Won
2022	Leipzig DOK Festival	Golden Dove	Nominated
2022	Spark Animation	Special Mention: Comedy	Won
2022	Cairo International Film Festival	Youssef Chahin Award for Best Short Film	Won
2022	Austin Film Festival	Jury Award for Best Animated Short	Won
2022	Austin Film Festival	Audience Award for Best Animated Short	Won
2023	Cordillera International Film Festival	Jury Award for Best Animated Short	Won
2023	Indy Shorts International Film Festival	Grand Prize for Best Animated Short	Won
2023	Indy Shorts International Film Festival	Audience Choice Award for Best Animated Short	Won
2023	Cleveland International Film Festival	Honorable Mention: Best Animated Short	Won
2023	Atlanta Film Festival	Jury Special Mention	Won
2023	Animafest Zagreb	Grand Prize	Nominated
2023	Guanajuato International Film Festival	Best Animated Short Film	Nominated
2023	Dances With Films	Special Recognition for Personal Storytelling	Won
