= Nube (film) =

2023 French-Mexican-Hungarian animated short film

- Directed by: Christian Arredondo Narváez; Diego Alonso Sánchez de la Barquera Estrada
- Written by: Christian Arredondo Narváez; Diego Alonso Sánchez de la Barquera Estrada
- Produced by: Valentin Maupin; Aristote Douroudakis; Bella Szederkényi; Bálint Farkas Gelley; Diego Alonso Sánchez de la Barquera Estrada; Christian Arredondo Narváez
- Edited by: Christian Arredondo Narváez; Diego Alonso Sánchez de la Barquera Estrada
- Music by: Thibault Cohade
- Production companies: Avec Ou Sans Vous; CUB Animation; Gobelins
- Distributed by: Pentacle Distribution
- Release date: 2023
- Running time: 7 minutes 31
- Countries: France; Mexico; Hungary

Nube is a 2023 French–Mexican–Hungarian animated short film written and directed by Christian Arredondo Narváez & Diego Alonso Sánchez de la Barquera Estrada. The 8-minutes animated film about a personified cloud Mother and her small child has been awarded at the Morelia International Film Festival, in Mexico, for Best Animated Short Film.

== Plot ==
After witnessing an ancient storm cloud weep its final raindrops and dissolve into sorrow, Noma, a billowing white cloud, senses with dread that her daughter Mixtli, a shadowy storm cloud, is in danger of raining too soon.

== Reception ==
Since its release, the film has been selected in various festivals around the world:

Year	Festivals	Award/Category	Status
2023	Morelia International Film Festival	Best Animated Short Film	Won
2024	Monstra – Animated Film Festival	Monstrinha Grand-Prix	Won
2024	Sydney Film Festival	Kids Shorts	Nominated
2024	Animafest Zagreb	Children and Youth Competition	Won
2024	Clermont-Ferrand International Short Film Festival	Young Audience	Nominated
2024	Ottawa International Animation Festival	Young Audiences 7+	Pending
