= Souvenir Souvenir =

- Directed by: Bastien Dubois
- Produced by: Amiel Tenenbaum; Simon Pénochet; Bastien Dubois
- Music by: Antonio Vivaldi; Anetha; Vandy Roc; John Hunter Jr; Jonathan Slott
- Distributed by: Miyu Distribution
- Release date: 2020
- Running time: 15 min 10 seconds
- Country: France

Souvenir Souvenir is an animated documentary short film directed by Bastien Dubois and produced by Amiel Tenenbaum, Simon Pénochet and Bastien Dubois. The short has been awarded in a number of festivals including in Clermont-Ferrand Festival, Seattle International Film Festival, Short Film Award and Sundance Film Festival and won an Annie Award in Best Short Subject category in 2021. It was shortlisted for the Academy Award for Best Animated Short Film but ultimately was not nominated.

== Production ==
This animated documentary is based on true facts about the Algerian war, intertwined with the director's family life and most of the voices are narrated by the characters themselves. The use of layers and superpositions by paint, blurry and grainy textures by the illustrator Jorge Gonzales match the layers of secrecy of the narrative. The film has two styles: a cartoony 2D animation, made by Train-Train studio and 3D models that mimic 2D hand-drawing and textures. Details were also added by hand-dray and TV paint.

== Plot ==
For ten years, a filmmaker attempts to make a movie out of his grandfather's Algerian war souvenirs. Both a historical denial and family taboo, the questions raised by the topic fail to be answered, and both personal and collective memory are left unsaid. The narrative shifts from the incapacity to speak, to the ability to ask the right question, and less about the grandfather experience and more about the making of a film.

== Accolades ==
Since its launch, the film has been selected in various festivals and academies around the world:

Year	Ceremony	Award/Category	Status
2020	Clermont-Ferrand International Short Film Festival	Best French-language animated film	Won
2020	Bogoshorts	Best International Short Film	Won
2020	Les Sommets du cinéma d'animation	Grand Prize	Won
2020	Tubingen Stuttgart International French-language Film Festival	Grand Prize for Best Short Film	Won
2020	Trouville Off-Courts Film Festival	Jury Special Mention	Won
2021	Seattle International Film Festival	Documentary Grand Jury Award	Won
2021	Mecal	Grand Prix	Won
2021	Pittsburgh Film Festival	Best Animation	Won
2021	Animest	Best Documentary	Won
2021	Sundance International Film Festival	Short Film Jury Award to the Best Animation	Won
2021	Annie Awards	Best short film	Won
2021	Oscars	Academy Award for Best Animated Short Film	Shortlisted

The short was part of the world touring screening The Animation Showcase 2021.
