= Hurikán =

2024 Czech animated short film

- Directed by: Jan Saska
- Written by: Jan Saska; Václav Hašek
- Produced by: Kamila Dohnalová; Martin Vandas; Alena Vandasová; Antoine Liétout; Ivan Zuber; Juraj Krasnohorský; Mladen Đukić
- Production companies: Last Films; Maurfilm; Laïdak Films; Artichoke; Aeon Production
- Release date: 2024
- Running time: 13 minutes
- Countries: Czech Republic; France; Slovakia; Bosnia and Herzegovina

Hurikán is a 2024 Czech animated short film co-written and directed by Jan Saska.

== Release ==
The 13-minutes film following the eponymous hero on a nighttime odyssey through Prague has been selected in various international film festivals, including the 2024 Annecy International Animation Film Festival and Hollyshorts Film Festival.

Hurikán was shortlisted for the 98th Academy Awards in the category of Best Animated Short Film.

== Plot ==
Set in Prague, Hurikán follows the story of Hurikán, who sets out to save his favorite beer stand from closing. Hoping to win the affection of the bartender he admires, he embarks on a quest to retrieve a new keg. What begins as a simple errand turns into a chaotic adventure through the unpredictable and boisterous streets of Žižkov, a neighborhood as unruly and hungover as Hurikán himself.

== Style ==
Hurikán combines elements of classic action cinema and film noir within the setting of Prague’s Žižkov district. Thematically, the film centers on antiheroes navigating a nocturnal cityscape, reflecting both external pursuits and internal conflicts.

The film pays homage to the golden era of Japanese animation from the 1980s and 1990s. It is a black-and-white, 2D animated short that combines traditional cel-style techniques with a digital production pipeline. Despite the use of 3D references during development, all visuals in the final film are hand-drawn and animated frame by frame.

== Accolades ==
Since its release, the film has been selected in various festivals around the world:

Year	Festivals	Award/Category	Status
2024	Annecy International Animation Film Festival	Audience Award for a Short Film	Won
2024	Czech Film Critics’ Award	Best Short Film	Won
2025	Clermont-Ferrand International Short Film Festival	Best Short Film	Nominated
2025	Sundance Film Festival	Best Short Film	Nominated
2025	Hollyshorts Film Festival	Best Animated Short Award	Won
2025	SXSW	Best Short Film	Nominated
2025	Festival Premiers Plans Angers	Audience Award	Won
2025	Animafest Zagreb	Audience Award	Won

== See also ==
- List of submissions for the Academy Award for Best Animated Short Film
