= Mum Is Pouring Rain =

2021 French animated short film

Mum is Pouring Rain
- French: Maman pleut des cordes
- Directed by: Hugo de Faucompret
- Written by: Hugo de Faucompret; Lison d'Andréa
- Produced by: Laïdak Films (Ivan Zuber and Antoine Liétout)
- Starring: Yolande Moreau; Arthur H Céline Sallette; Siam Georget Rolland
- Edited by: Benjamin Massoubre
- Music by: Pablo Pico
- Production companies: Laïdak Films; Dandelooo
- Distributed by: Les Films du Préau; Dandelooo
- Release date: 2021
- Running time: 29 minutes
- Country: France

Mum is Pouring Rain (French: Maman pleut des cordes) is a French animated short film produced by Laïdak Films written by Hugo de Faucompret and Lison d'Andréa and directed by Hugo de Faucompret. Released in 2021, it won the Jury Prize in the Special TV category at the Annecy international animated film festival the same year. The film was shortlisted for the Academy Award for Best Animated Short Film for the 94th Academy Awards but ultimately was not nominated.

== Plot ==
Jane is looking forward to spending Christmas with her Mom who is battling a depression, after her dad's death so she is sent unknowingly to her Grandma's instead. The holidays turn out to be quite an adventure as Jane meets new friends: Cloclo, the gigantic hobo who lives in the forest, and Sonia and Leon, two local kids. As she learns to open herself to others, Jane will inspire her mother the necessary strength to get back on her feet.

== Production ==
The film, commissioned by Canal+, is created by Hugo de Faucompret and co-written with Lison d'Andréa. The graphic design and the storyboard are executed by Hugo de Faucompret. The backgrounds of this 29-minutes-film were all hand-painted with gouache, and the 2D animation was digitally made on TVPaint with pencil-scratched lines feeling. In 2022, the film is getting two sequels in order to combine a trilogy as a feature-length work.

== Accolades ==
Since its launch, the film has been selected in various festivals and academies around the world, including:

Year	Ceremony	Award/Category	Status
2021	Berlin International Short Film Festival for Young and Children	Official Selection	Nominated
2021	Cinanima	International Panorama	Nominated
2021	DOK Leipzig	Documentary and Animated Film	Nominated
2021	Bucheon International Animation Festival	International Competition	Nominated
2021	Animatou	School Audience Award and Children Audience Award	Won
2021	Rhode Island International Film Festival	Grand Prize Winner Best Short Animation	Won
2021	La Guarimba Film Festival	La Grotta dei Piccoli Award	Won
2021	Annecy International Animation Film Festival	Jury Award for a TV Special	Won
2021	Animafest Zagreb	Family Program	Nominated
2021	San Francisco International Film Festival	Golden Gate Award International Competition	Nominated
2021	Shanghai TV Festival	Best Animation Award	Won
2021	ONE country ONE Film International Festival	Young Audience Award Winner	Won
2021	Oscars	Academy Award for Best Animated Short Film	Shortlisted

The short was part of the world touring screening The Animation Showcase 2021.

== Voice cast ==
- Yolande Moreau as Mémé Oignon
- Céline Sallette as Cécile
- Arthur H as Cloclo
- Siam Georget Rolland as Jeanne
