= Armat =

- Directed by: Élodie Dermange
- Written by: Élodie Dermange
- Produced by: Nicolas Burlet
- Production company: Nadasdy Film
- Release date: October 2022
- Running time: 11 minutes
- Country: Switzerland

Armat is a 2022 animated short film directed by Élodie Dermange. The 11-minute short premiered at DOK Leipzig 2022. The film is an animated documentary about Dermange's Armenian origins, and it has been featured in a number of international film festivals, such as Aspen Shortsfest, the Stuttgart Festival of Animated Film and the Fest Anca International Animation Festival, where it won the award for Best Short Film.

== Plot ==
As Élodie investigates her Armenian origins by talking to her family members. As she interviews them, she discovers a painful history where violence and the inability to express love were passed down from one generation to the next.

== Reception ==
Since its release, the film has been selected in various festivals around the world:

Year	Festivals	Award/Category	Status
2022	DOK LEIPZIG	Audience Award	Nominated
2023	Fest Anca - International Animation Festival	Best Animated Short (International Competition)	Won
2023	Animator Fest	Best Short Film	Won
2023	Fantoche Animation Film Festival	Jury's Special Mention	Won
2023	Festival du Cinéma au Féminin	Best Animated Film	Won
2023	Animatricks Animation Festival	Best Documentary Short Film	Nominated
2023	Mecal International Short Film Festival of Barcelona	Best Documentary Film	Nominated
