= The Head Vanishes =

- Une tête disparaît
- Directed by: Franck Dion
- Produced by: National Film Board of Canada, Papy3D Productions, and ARTE France
- Music by: Pierre Caillet
- Release date: November 3, 2016 (New Chitose Airport International Animation Festival)
- Country: France
- Language: French

The Head Vanishes (French:Une tête disparaît) is a 2016 Canada/France animated short by Franck Dion about a woman with dementia who is determined to make her annual train trip to the seaside.

== Production ==
Co-produced by the National Film Board of Canada, Papy3D Productions and ARTE France, the film was partly inspired by Dion's experiences with his great-grandmother, with whom he was close and saw deteriorate mentally while he was a child. Dion began to work on the film in 2014, after deciding to depart from a feature-film project.

A key narrative element in the film is the central character literally "losing her head" on the train trip—again inspired by a true-life anecdote involving his ill grandmother, who had once asked Dion's mother to fetch her head from under the sink, believing that it had rolled under there. Dion decided to set the film on a train, with the film's title a reference to Alfred Hitchcock's The Lady Vanishes. Before making the film, he watched and researched films about trains as well as films set on trains.

Dion used 3D models in order to communicate to his animators what he was looking for and emphasized economy of movement and simple, character-based gestures. Music was by composer Pierre Caillet, a frequent collaborator. Pierre Yves Drapeau did the sound design, with the idea of pigeon sounds to accompany the appearance of the central character's daughter suggested by Julie Roy, the film's NFB producer. The Head Vanishes is Dion's second collaboration with the NFB, following Edmond Was a Donkey (Edmond était un âne).

== Accolades ==
The film received the Cristal Award for best short film at the 2016 Annecy International Animated Film Festival. In December 2016, it received the Best Canadian Screenplay Award at the Whistler Film Festival. The short was also included in The animation Showcase 2016 and shortlisted for an Academy Award for Best Animated Short Film nomination, but was not nominated.
