= Steakhouse (film) =

- Directed by: Špela Čadež
- Written by: Gregor Zorc
- Produced by: Tina Smrekar, Špela Čadež, Pierre Baussaron, Fabian Driehorst, Emmanuel-Alain Raynal
- Music by: Olfamož, Tomaž Grom
- Production companies: Finta Film, Fabian&Fred, RTV Slovenija, Miyu Productions
- Distributed by: Miyu Distribution
- Release date: 2021
- Running time: 10 minutes
- Countries: Slovenia; Germany; France

Steakhouse is a 2021 Slovenian animated short film directed by Špela Čadež. The short has been presented and won awards in a number of festivals, such as a Jury Mention at the Clermont-Ferrand Film Festival and the Short Film Jury Award at the Annecy International Animation Film Festival qualifying the short for the 95th Academy Awards and got nominated for an Annie Award in Best Short Subject category in 2022.

== Plot ==
The short film invades the privacy of a couple as it takes place in closed apartment.

== Reception ==
Since its launch, the film has been selected in various festivals and academies around the world:

Year	Festivals	Award/Category	Status
2021	Locarno Festival	Young Jury Special Mention	Won
2021	Ottawa International Animation Festival	Best Animation Technique	Won
2021	Guadalajara International Film Festival	International Award special mention best animated film	Won
2022	Annecy International Animated Film Festival	Short Film Jury Award	Won
2022	Clermont-Ferrand International Short Film Festival	Special Mention of the Jury	Won
2022	Anima Brussels Festival	Grand Prize for Best Short Film	Won
2022	Barcelona International Short and Animation Film Festival	Main Award Best Animated Film	Won
2022	Tricky Women	Sabine & Nicolai Sawczynski Award Audience Award	Won
2022	Annie Awards	Best Short Subject	Nominated
