= Beautiful Men =

2023 Belgian-French-Dutch animated short film

- Directed by: Nicolas Keppens
- Written by: Nicolas Keppens
- Produced by: Brecht Van Elslande; Erik Verkerk; Joost Van Den Bosch; Emmanuel-Alain Raynal; Pierre Baussaron
- Starring: Peter Van den Begin; Peter de Graef; Tom Dewispelaere; Nayat Sari
- Cinematography: Maxim Hectors
- Music by: Nicolas Snyder
- Production companies: Animal Tank; Miyu Productions; Ka-Ching Cartoons
- Distributed by: Miyu Distribution
- Release date: 14 October 2023
- Running time: 19 minutes
- Countries: Belgium; France; Netherlands
- Languages: Dutch; Turkish

Beautiful Men is a 2023 animated short film written and directed by Nicolas Keppens. On January 23, 2025, the film was nominated to the 97th Academy Awards in the Best Animated Short Film category.

== Plot ==
Three brothers -- depressive Steven, standoffish Bart, and kindhearted Koen -- are in various stages of hair loss and travel to Turkey for hair transplantations. However, Steven mistakenly booked only one surgery, and is too nervous to admit to his brothers that they will not be able to proceed as planned.

As their journey unfolds, Bart and Steven's insecurities grow: Bart worries over a possible lump in his testicles (even urging Steven to check it for him), admits being scared of the surgery to his wife back home, and stays in a room apart from his brothers, reluctant to spend more time with them. Steven struggles with his mistake and is unable to voice his feelings or stand up for himself. Koen seems to be the only satisfied one of them, treating both brothers with kindness and understanding.

On a foggy afternoon, Steven and Koen attempt to go on a walk together to explore Istanbul while Bart stays behind to use the sauna. Briefly separated due to the heavy fog, Steven panics and eventually reveals to Koen, upon reuniting, that he only made one appointment by mistake. Since Koen has no hair at all, Steven urges him to take the appointment so that he can feel beautiful. However, Bart, having heard their voices, wandered out of the sauna and into the street (while naked), and overhears the conversation. Angered, he confronts the brothers back at the hotel and demands the surgery for himself.

Before the argument can progress, however, fog enters the hotel and accidentally sets off the fire alarm. The brothers flee, with Bart leading them to an emergency exit. It is revealed in a voiceover that a few men in the hotel were sent to the hospital over minor injuries sustained in the chaos, coincidentally freeing up hair transplant surgeries for all three brothers at the same time. They eventually leave Turkey, with Koen reflecting on their journey in Istanbul. An epilogue shows Steven and Koen happening upon Bart, who is at the barber, with all three men enjoying full heads of hair.

== Release ==
Since its release, the film has been selected in various festivals around the world:

Year	Festivals	Award/Category	Status
2024	Annecy International Animation Film Festival	Alexeïeff – Parker Award	Won
2024	Ottawa International Animation Festival	Best Narrative Short	Won
2024	Aspen ShortsFest	Best Animation	Won
2024	Animation Is Film Festival	Award Winning Short Films	Nominated
2024	Hamptons International Film Festival	Best Narrative Short Film Special Mention	Won
2024	Anima Brussels Festival	National Short Film Competition	Nominated
2025	Animation First Festival	Best Francophone Short	Won
2025	97th Academy Awards	Best Animated Short Film	Nominated

== Accolades ==
The 19-minutes animated film about brotherhood and insecurities has been showcased and rewarded in various international film festivals, including the Annecy International Animation Film Festival, Ottawa International Animation Festival and Animation Is Film Festival in Los Angeles. It was nominated for the Best Animated Short Film category at the 97th Academy Awards.
