= Percebes (film) =

2024 animated documentary film

- Directed by: Alexandra Ramires; Laura Gonçalves
- Written by: Alexandra Ramires; Laura Gonçalves; Regina Guimarães
- Produced by: David Doutel; Vasco Sá; Edwina Liard; Nidia Santiago
- Music by: Nicolas Tricot
- Production companies: BAP – Animation Studios; Ikki Films
- Distributed by: Agência - Portuguese Short Film Agency
- Release date: 2024
- Running time: 11 minutes
- Countries: Portugal; France
- Language: Portuguese

Percebes is a 2024 Portuguese-French animated documentary short film written and directed by Alexandra Ramires and Laura Gonçalves. The 11-minutes animated film about the weird looking barnacle known as percebes in Portugal has been awarded with the Cristal for Best Short Movie at the Annecy International Animation Film Festival. It also has been awarded at various international film festivals, including Ottawa International Animation Festival and Curtas Vila do Conde - International Film Festival.

== Plot ==
Set in the Algarve coast, Percebes explores through a documental and poetic narrative the life cycle of the resilient percebes = goose barnacle. As the film unfolds the surrounding of this animal, voices of the Algarve native people are heard, revealing their testimony to their region, their customs and their complex relationship with tourism, shedding light on the delicate balance between tradition, nature and survival.

== Release ==
Year	Festivals	Award/Category	Status
2024	Annecy International Animation Film Festival	Cristal for Best short	Won
2024	Ottawa International Animation Film Festival	Best Design	Won
2024	Toronto International Film Festival	Short Cuts	Nominated
2024	Curtas Vila do Conde - International Film Festival	National Competition (Public Prize)	Won
2024	Animafest Zagreb	Grand Competition - Short Film Program	Nominated
2024	39th Guadalajara International Film Festival	Rigo Mora Award - Special Mention	Won
