= My Life in Versailles =

2019 animated short film

- Directed by: Clémence Madeleine-Perdrillat; Nathaniel H'Limi
- Written by: Clémence Madeleine-Perdrillat
- Starring: Charlotte Rampling; Jemma Wilcox; Saul Jephcott
- Music by: Albin de la Simone
- Production companies: Films Grand Huit; Miyu Productions; Xilam
- Distributed by: Dandelooo
- Release date: June 10, 2019 (Annecy)
- Running time: 29 minutes
- Country: France
- Languages: French, English

My Life in Versailles (French: La Vie de château) is a French animated comedy short film directed by Clémence Madeleine-Perdrillat and Nathaniel H'Limi. Released in 2019, it won the jury prize at the Annecy International Animated Film Festival the same year. This film is the starting point of a series of five 26-minute-long episodes and a children's illustrated book.

== Plot ==
As a shy little girl, eight-year-old Violette loses her parents in a bomb attack in Paris. From now on, she will live with her uncle Régis, a maintenance agent at the Palace of Versailles. Violette hates him: she thinks he stinks. So she decides she won't say a word to him. The stubborn little girl and the big bear will tame each other and together get through their grief.

== Voice cast ==
French

- Ema Lucas-Viguier as Violette
- Frédéric Pierrot as Régis
- Anne Alvaro as Geneviève
- Céline Ronté as Olga
- Malcolm Vallet-Armellino as Malcolm

English

- Jemma Wilcox as Violette
- Saul Jephcott as Regis
- Charlotte Rampling as Geneviève
- Margeaux Lampley as Olga, parents, kids
- David Coburn as Mr Angel, funeral Director, guide
- Owen de la Hoyde as Malcolm
- Barbara Weber-Scaff as the teacher, parents, kids

== Wins ==
The main awards received by the film include:

- France - Jury prize for a TV special at the 2019 edition of the Annecy International Animation Film Festival
- France - Prix de la compétition Jeune Public & Prix Unifrance Jeune Public du Festival international du film en plein air de Grenoble
- France - Prix des enfants Courts des Petits - Premiers Plans d’Angers
- France - Best Animated Short Film for Kids - Imaginaria
- France - Coup de cœur pour une oeuvre audiovisuelle Association Les femmes s’Animent - Festival national du film d’animation
- France - Réanimania Film Festival : Mention spéciale du Jury Festival Anima • Best TV & educational Film
- France - Les enfants terribles de Huy : Coup de Cœur du public - Coup de cœur du jury jeune - coup de cœur de 6NEMA
- France - Prix du Meilleur Film d’Animation One Country One Film
- USA - New-York International Children Festival : New York International Children's Audience Award • NYICFF “Grown-Ups” Best Short Film Award • NYICFF Grand Prize Short Film Award
- USA - Chicago International Children's Film Festival : Best TV Award Professional and Children Jury
- USA - Best Animation Short - Dell-IKFF
- Germany - Tricks for Kids Award - Stuttgart International Festival of Animated Film
- Portugal - IndieJunior Audience Award
- Italy - Best animated Short Film for Kids Imaginaria
