= Cardboard (film) =

2025 British animated short film

- Short film poster
- Directed by: J.P. Vine
- Written by: J.P. Vine
- Produced by: Michaela Manas Malina
- Starring: Richard Webber; Cameron Baggarley
- Edited by: Conor Wilson
- Music by: Hugo Brijs
- Production companies: Locksmith Animation; DNEG Animation; Ritzy Animation
- Release dates: June 2025 (Annecy International Animation Film Festival); 19 October 2025 (2025 BFI London Film Festival)
- Running time: 10 minutes
- Country: United Kingdom
- Language: English

Cardboard is a 2025 British animated short film written and directed by J.P. Vine and produced by Locksmith Animation, DNEG Animation and Ritzy Animation. The short film, which is about a family of homeless pigs, was selected in various festivals, including the Annecy International Animation Film Festival, the LA Shorts International Film Festival, the BFI London Film Festival, the Flickers Rhode Island International Film Festival and the Animation Is Film Festival. Cardboard was shortlisted for Best Animated Short Film at the 98th Academy Awards and was also nominated for Best Animated Short Subject at the 53rd Annie Awards in 2026.

== Premise ==
A single dad pig and his piglets move into a dilapidated trailer park. While the dad feels like he let down his family, the kids use a cardboard box to trigger an imaginative adventure, transforming Dad’s view of their new home.

== Cast ==
- Richard Webber as Dad
- Cameron Baggarley as Piglets
- J.P. Vine, Alicia Davies and Andrew Baggarley as Additional voices

== Award nominations ==
Award	Year	Category	Recipient(s)	Result
53rd Annie Awards	2026	Best Animated Short Subject	Cardboard	Nominated
79th British Academy Film Awards	2026	Best British Short Animation	J.P. Vine and Michaela Manas Malina	Nominated
