= Nicolas Keppens =

Belgian film director (born 1989)

- Born: July 5, 1989 (age 36); Aalst, Belgium
- Citizenship: Belgian
- Occupation: Film director
- Known for: Beautiful Men; Easter Eggs
- Awards: European Film Award for Best Short Film

Nicolas Keppens (born July 5, 1989) is an Oscar-nominated film director and artist born in Aalst, Belgium. He is mostly known for his Oscars-shortlisted film Beautiful Men (2023) and his award-winning short Easter Eggs (2021), an animated short film about finding extraordinary things in ordinary places.

== Career ==
Keppens first studied animation at KASK School of Arts in Ghent, graduating in 2012. He then obtained a film degree at the LUCA School of Arts in Brussels. After his studies, Keppens first worked as a cleanup and in-between animator at Lunanime for Phantom Boy. From 2015 to 2021, he worked as production manager for the Hans Op de Beeck contemporary art studio. Since 2021, Keppens has been an animation lecturer at the KASK School of Arts.

== Work ==
=== Film ===
- 2012: Superstars (short film) - director, writer, animator.
- 2017: Wildebeest (short film) - director, writer, animator.
- 2021: Easter Eggs (short film) - director, writer, editor.
- 2023: The Miracle (short film) - set designer.
- 2023: Beautiful Men (short film) - director, writer, editor, line producer, production designer.

=== Contemporary Art ===
- 2021: Belle Epoque at Netwerk Aalst (immersive installation) - co-creator with Matthias Phlips (as performance duo Mat & Nikki).
- 2021: Hinder (exhibition) - co-creator with Matthias Phlips (as performance duo Mat & Nikki).
- 2024: De Wolharige Neushoorn (public artwork) - artist.

== Recognition ==
Keppens' short films have received multiple awards at international film festivals, including the Award for Best Narrative Film at the 2024 Ottawa International Animation Festival, the Best Belgian Short Film Award at the 2024 Anima Brussels Animation Festival and the Alexeïeff - Parker Award at the 2024 Annecy International Animation Film Festival for the short film Beautiful Men (2023).

With his short Easter Eggs (2021), Keppens won the Grand Prix at the 2021 Cinanima Festival and the Jury Award at the 2021 Annecy International Animation Film Festival.

His short film Wildebeest (2018), which he co-wrote and co-directed with Matthias Phlips, won the Best Film Award at the 2018 Fantoche International Animation Film Festival and was nominated for a European Film Award.

On January 23rd, 2025, Keppens received his first Academy Award nomination with the film Beautiful Men (2023).
