= Playing God (2024 film) =

2024 Italian French animated short film

- Directed by: Matteo Burani
- Written by: Matteo Burani; Gianmarco Valentino
- Produced by: Arianna Gheller; Nicolas Schmerkin
- Production companies: Studio Croma Animation; Autour de Minuit
- Distributed by: Onira
- Release date: 2024
- Running time: 9 minutes
- Country: {{Plainlist|: Italy

Playing God is a 2024 Italian animated short film directed by Matteo Burani. The 9-minutes stop-motion animated film about the power of finding community has been selected in various international film festivals, including Animayo International Film Festival, Tribeca Film Festival and Annecy International Film Festival.

== Plot ==
Through the obsessive search for perfection of a Sculptor, a clay sculpture comes to life in a workshop, surrounded by past failed versions of itself.

== Accolades ==
Since its release, the film has been selected in various festivals around the world:

Year	Festivals	Award/Category	Status
2024	Settimana Internazionale della Critica di Venezia	FEDIC Award	Won
2024	Bucheon International Animation Festival	International Competition	Nominated
2025	Nastri d'Argento	Best Animated Short Film	Won
2025	Clermont-Ferrand International Short Film Festival	Best Animated Short	Nominated
2025	Annecy International Film Festival	Midnight Shorts	Nominated
2025	Animayo International Film Festival	Grand Prize	Won
2025	Short Shorts Film Festival	Best Animated Short	Nominated
2025	Tribeca Film Festival	Best Animated Short	Won
