= Emile Awards =

European animation awards

- Current: 2nd Emile Awards
- Awarded for: Excellence in animation film
- Presented by: The European Animation Awards Association
- First award: December 2017; 8 years ago
- Website: animationawards.eu

The Emile Awards is an annual ceremony celebrating excellence and diversity in the European animation film industry. The awards consist of 18 trophies for outstanding accomplishment in European animation, as well as the Lotte Reiniger Lifetime Achievement Award, which is awarded to "an individual in recognition of their lifetime contribution to the art of animation exhibited by an outstanding contribution to excellence in animation." The Emile Awards are presented by the European Animation Awards Association, which was founded in 2015 under the name "European Animation Pride Awards".

Memberships in the European Animation Awards Academy consist of two main categories: Associate (individual) and Active (individual, for associations and companies). Joining the European Animation Awards Association is open to professionals, students, and fans of animation for a membership fee. All members are permitted to vote for the Emile, while active members are also granted a vote in the general assemblies designing the association's board members.

The 1st Emile Awards ceremony took place on 8 December 2017 at Nouveau Siècle in Lille.

== History ==
While attending the 42nd Annie Awards organized by the International Animated Film Society, Didier Brunner impressed by the vitality and dynamism of this event decided to create a similar event covering the European industry, to celebrate each year the excellence and variety of the European animation know-how.

On 29 July 2019 the 3rd Emile Awards was cancelled as various sponsors had withdrawn their financial support for the event. The EAA are planning to host the awards again in 2020.

=== Naming the "Emile Awards" ===
The Awards name is a tribute of both pioneers animation artists Émile Reynaud and Émile Cohl.

=== Trophy ===
The first Emile Award trophy or statuette will be discovered at the 1st Emile Awards Ceremony. The name of the trophy designer remains unknown for now.

== Award categories ==
=== Emile Awards ===
- Best Achievement in a Student Film
- Best Direction in an Animated Short Film
- Best Background and Character Design in an Animated Short Film
- Best Achievement in a Commissioned Film
- Best Direction in a TV/Broadcast Production
- Best Writing in a TV/Broadcast Production
- Best Storyboard in a TV/Broadcast Production
- Best Character Animation in a TV/Broadcast Production
- Best Background and Character Design in a TV/Broadcast Production
- Best Soundtrack in a TV/Broadcast Production
- Best Direction in a Feature Film
- Best Writing in a Feature Film
- Best Storyboard in a Feature Film
- Best Character Animation in a Feature Film
- Best Background and Character Design in a Feature Film
- Best Soundtrack in a Feature Film

For the 2018 edition, two categories have been added:

- Best Sound Design in a TV/Broadcast Production
- Best Sound Design in a Feature Film

=== Life Time Achievement Award ===
- Lotte Reiniger Award

== See also ==
- List of animation awards
