= Éiru =

2025 Irish animated short film

- Directed by: Giovanna Ferrari
- Produced by: Nora Twomey
- Starring: Coco Teehan Roche
- Production company: Cartoon Saloon
- Release date: April 5, 2025 (Cleveland International Film Festival)
- Running time: 13 minutes
- Country: Ireland

Éiru (/ˈɛəruː/ AIR-oo) is a 2025 Irish animated short film written and directed by Giovanna Ferrari and produced by Cartoon Saloon. The 13-minute animated film about a child trying to prove herself to her clan has been awarded in various international film festivals, including the Galway Film Fleadh.

== Plot ==
When the well in a warrior village runs dry, a brave child goes underground to find the missing water.

== Accolades ==
Since its release, the film has been selected in various festivals around the world:

Year	Festivals	Award/Category	Status
2025	Galway Film Fleadh	James Horgan Award for Best Animation Short with Animation Ireland	Won
2025	Cleveland International Film Festival	Best Animated Short	Nominated
2025	Indy Shorts International Film Festival	Grand Prize for Animated Short	Won
2025	Fantasia International Film Festival	Satoshi Kon Award for Excellence in Animation / Best Short Film	Won
2025	RiverRun International Film Festival	Best Animated Short Film	Won
2025	ShortShorts Film Festival	Best Animated Short Film	Nominated
2025	Animation Is Film Festival	Special Jury Prize	Won
