= Hors Piste =

- Directed by: Oscar Malet, Léo Brunel, Camille Jalabert, Loris Cavalier
- Produced by: Julien Deparis
- Music by: Nicolas Peiron
- Production company: Ecole des Nouvelles Images
- Distributed by: Miyu Distribution
- Release date: 2 February 2019 (Clermont-Ferrand International Short Film Festival)
- Running time: 7 minutes
- Country: France

Hors Piste is a 2018 CG animated short film directed by Oscar Malet, Léo Brunel, Camille Jalabert & Loris Cavalier during their studies at l'École des Nouvelles Images, French animation school. This short has been presented and won awards in a number of festivals including Clermont-Ferrand International Short Film Festival, the Aspen Shortsfest, the Flickerfest, The Palm Springs International Festival of Short Films and the New York International Children's Film Festival where it won the Oscar Qualifying prize for best animation.

The short won a BAFTA the BAFTA Student Film Awards for best animated student film in 2019 and was nominated for Best Student Film 2019 at the 46th Annie Awards organized by ASIFA-Hollywood.

== Plot ==
The two best rescue workers of the region are ready for their new mission. Despite their professionalism and their determination, it will not go as planned.
