= Grandpa Walrus =

- Directed by: Lucrèce Andreae
- Written by: Lucrèce Andreae
- Produced by: Caïmans Productions
- Edited by: Guillaume Lauras, Catherine Aladenise
- Music by: Flavien van Haezevelde
- Distributed by: Caïmans Productions
- Release date: May 27, 2017 (Cannes Film Festival)
- Running time: 14mn
- Country: France

Grandpa Walrus (Original title (FR): Pépé le morse) is an animated short film directed by Lucrèce Andreae and produced by Caïmans Productions. The short has been presented and won awards in a number of festivals including in Cannes Film Festival, The Annecy International Animation Film Festival where it won The Audience Award., winner of The César Award for Best Animated Short Film at the French Motion Picture César Academy, nominated at the Annie Awards and Shortlisted at the Oscars.

== Plot ==
On the windy and cloudy beach, Granny is praying, Mum is shouting, the sisters don't care, Lucas is alone. Grandpa was a weird guy, now he's dead.

== Awards ==
Since its launch, the film has received numerous awards, and selected in more than 100 festivals around the world.

Year	Presenter/Festival	Award/Category	Status
2017	Académie des Arts et Techniques du Cinéma	César Award for Best Short Film	Won
2017	Annecy International Animated Film Festival	"Annecy International Animated Film Festival"	Won
2017	KROK International Animated Films Festival	"Special Prize for the Best Debut"	Won
2017	Bucheon International Animation Festival (BIAF)	"Jury Prize"	Won
2017	Manchester Animation Film Festival	"Audience Award"	Won
2017	Princeton International film festival	"Grand Director Award"	Won
2018	Annie Award	"Annie Award for Best Animated Short Subject"	Nominated
2018	Oscars	"Academy Award for Best Animated Short Film"	Shortlisted
