= Špela Čadež =

Slovenian film director

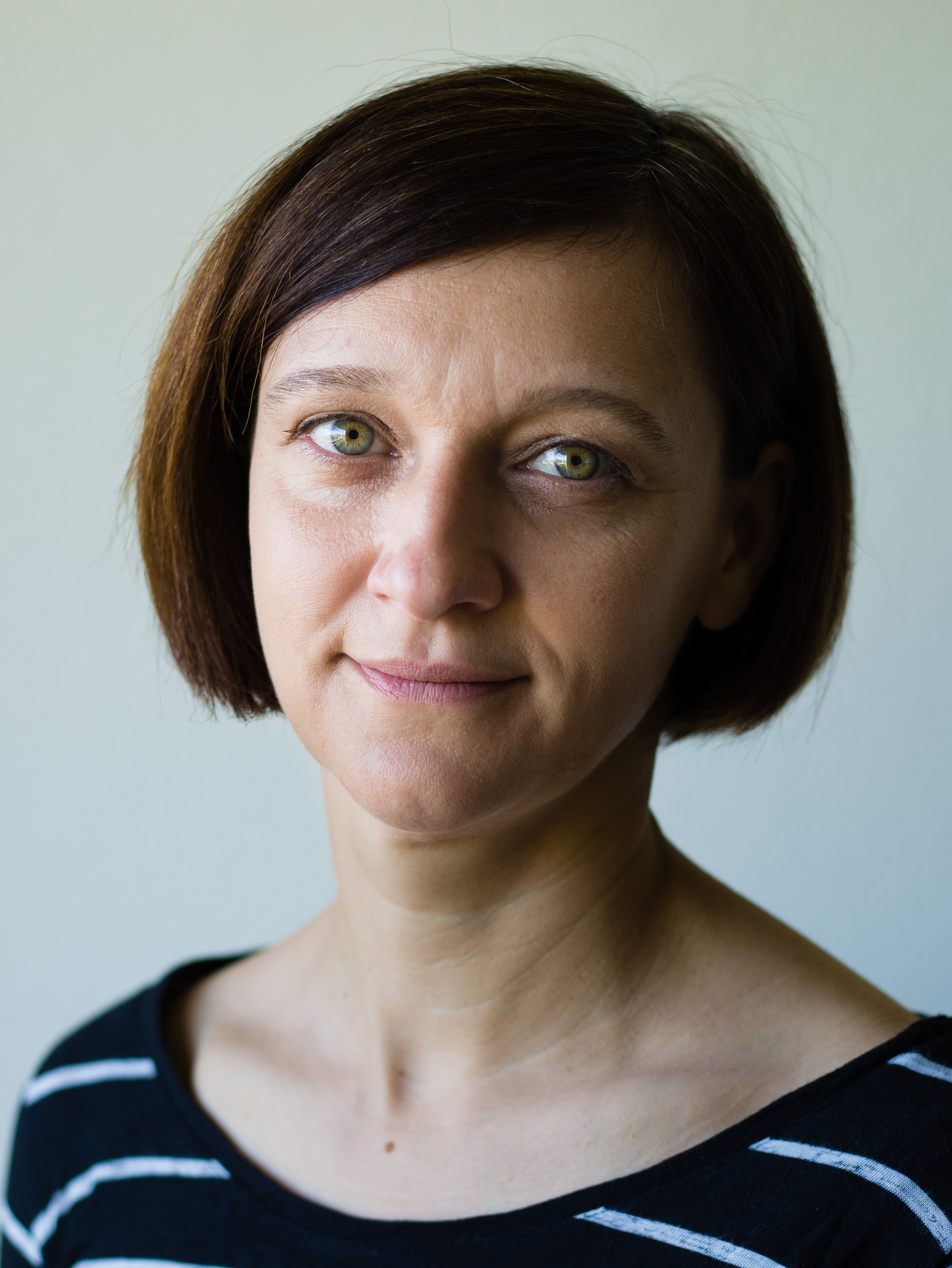
- Born: November 28, 1977 (age 48); Ljubljana, Slovenia
- Occupations: Director, scriptwriter, art director
- Years active: 2008–present
- Known for: Steakhouse, Nighthawk, Boles

Špela Čadež (born in Ljubljana) is a Slovenian director and film producer of animated films. She is mostly known for her use of the multiplane camera technique in her animated films.

== Career ==
After graduating in visual communication design (2002) in Ljubljana, she continued her studies at the Academy of Media Arts in Cologne. She specialises in analog animation; multiplane and puppet animation. In Cologne she made the films "Zasukanec" and "Lovesick". Her animated films have been awarded over 100 prizes. Špela Čadež has been working in Slovenia as an animation film director and producer since 2008. She became a member of the Academy of Motion Picture Arts and Sciences in 2017.

== Filmography (selected) ==
- Steakhouse (2021)
- Orange is the New Black - Unraveled (2017)
- Nighthawk (2016)
- Boles (2013)
- Last Minute (2010)
- Far East Film Festival Trailer (2009)
- Marathon (2008)
- Liebeskrank (2007)
- Zasukanec (2004)

== Recognition ==
Čadež's latest film Steakhouse premiered at Locarno Film Festival and got shortlisted for the 95th Academy Awards under the category Best Animated Short Film. It also won the Jury Award at the 2021 Annecy Animation Festival. Her previous film Nighthawk screened at Sundance Festival. In 2022 she received the highest Slovenian cultural accolade, the Prešeren Fund Award, for her work described as the “culmination of the revival of original Slovenian animated filmmaking".
