= 40th Guadalajara International Film Festival =

2025 film festival

- Official poster by Jis.
- Opening film: I Am Frankelda
- Location: Guadalajara, Mexico
- Awards: Mezcal Award: Llamarse Olimpia; Best Ibero-American Film: The Blue Trail
- Festival date: June 6–14, 2025

Guadalajara International Film Festival
- 2026 2024

The 40th Guadalajara International Film Festival took place from June 6 to 14, 2025, in Guadalajara, Mexico. The festival opened with the Mexican Animated film I Am Frankelda, based on the series Frankelda's Book of Spooks and directed by brothers Arturo and Roy Ambriz.

The documentary film Llamarse Olimpia, directed by Indira Cato, won the Mezcal Award for Best Mexican Film; Gabriel Mascaro's international co-production The Blue Trail won Best Ibero-American Film, and Albert Serra's Afternoons of Solitude won Best Ibero-American Documentary Film.

== Background ==
Portugal was chosen as the guest of honor for this year's edition, with Portuguese actress Maria de Medeiros being honored with the Homenaje, Guest of Honor. Mexican actress and film producer Dolores Heredia received the Silver Mayahuel Lifetime Achievement Award (Mayahuel de Plata), while Mexican film producer Mónica Lozano Serrano was honoured with the Mayahuel FICG Industry Award. Chilean actress Daniela Vega received the Maguey Queer Icon Award, Mexican musician Denisse Guerrero and lead vocalist of the electropop band Belanova received the Maguey Lifetime Achievement Award, and Spanish filmmaker J. A. Bayona received the International Mayahuel Award.

A new section named Cine de Género was introduced, focused on "genre films", including horror, fantasy, and science fiction.

The festival's poster was designed by cartoonist José Ignacio Solórzano "Jis" and features a centaur as a metaphor for "the nature of cinema, a fusion of diverse elements, a times wonderful, other times chaotic".

== Official selections ==
The following films were selected for the different sections:

=== Mezcal Award ===
Highlighted title indicates section's best film winner.

English Title	Original Title	Director(s)	Production countrie(s)
At the End of the World (HeJ)	En el fin del mundo	Abraham Escobedo-Salas	Mexico, Belgium
Being Olimpia	Llamarse Olimpia	Indira Cato	Mexico
Boca Vieja		Yovegami Ascona Mora	Mexico
Café Chairel		Fernando Barreda Luna	Mexico
Crocodiles	Cocodrilos	J. Xavier Velasco	Mexico, United States
Islander	Isleño	César Talamantes	Mexico
Miraba Caer las Gotas Iluminadas por los Relámpagos, y Cada Que Respiraba Suspiraba, y Cada Vez Que Pensaba, Pensaba en Ti		José de Jesús Gutiérrez García, Carlos San Juan	Mexico
Un Mundo Para Mí (MG)		Alejandro Zuno	Mexico
Rock, Weed and Wheels	Autos, Mota y Rocanrol	José Manuel Cravioto	Mexico
Twelve Moons	Doce Lunas	Victoria Franco	Mexico

(MG) indicates eligible for the Maguey Award, for films that include LGBTQ+ themes.
(HeJ) indicates film eligible for the Hecho en Jalisco Award.

=== Ibero-American Fiction Feature Film ===
Highlighted title indicates section's best film winner.

English Title	Original Title	Director(s)	Production countrie(s)
Cuerpo Celeste		Nayra Ilic García	Chile, Italia
Away (MG)	Molt lluny	Gerard Oms	Spain, Netherlands
The Best Mother in the World	A melhor mãe do mundo	Anna Muylaert	Brazil
Bitter Gold	Oro amargo	Juan Olea	Chile, Mexico, Uruguay, Germany
The Blue Trail (MG)	O Último Azul	Gabriel Mascaro	Brazil, Mexico, Netherlands, Chile
La Quinta		Silvina Schnicer	Argentina, Brazil, Chile, Spain
Deaf	Sorda	Eva Libertad	Spain
Dreaming of Lions	Sonhar com Leões	Paolo Marinou-Blanco	Portugal, Brazil, Spain
Martina's Search	A Procura de Martina	Márcia Faria	Brazil, Uruguay
Esta Isla		Lorraine Jones Molina, Cristian Carretero	Puerto Rico
Tiguere		José Maria Cabral	Dominican Republic
The Wild Years	Los años salvajes	Andrés Nazarala	Chile

(MG) indicates eligible for the Maguey Award, for films that include LGBTQ+ themes.

=== Ibero-American Documentary Feature Film ===
Highlighted title indicates section's best film winner.

English Title	Original Title	Director(s)	Production countrie(s)
Cais		Safira Moreira	Brazil
El Canto de las Manos		María Valverde	Spain, United States
Copan		Carine Wallauer	Brazil, France
Runa Simi		Augusto Zegarra	Peru
Croma (MG)		Manuel Abramovich	Argentina, Germany, Austria
Afternoons of Solitude	Tardes de soledad	Albert Serra	Spain, France, Portugal
Black Gold	Ouro negro	Takashi Sugimoto	Portugal
The Flamenco Guitar of Yerai Cortés	La guitarra flamenca de Yerai Cortés	Antón Álvarez	Spain
Eco de Luz		Misha Vallejo Prut	Ecuador, Argentina
Paradise		Ana Rieper	Brazil
Savanna and the Mountain	A Savana e a Montanha	Paulo Carneiro	Portugal, Uruguay
Sunset of the Crickets	El atardecer de los grillos	Gonzalo Almeida	Argentina

(MG) indicates eligible for the Maguey Award, for films that include LGBTQ+ themes.

=== Ibero-American Short Film ===
Highlighted title indicates section's best film winner.

English Title	Original Title	Director(s)	Production countrie(s)
Granma(ther)		Nicolás Baksht Somonte	Mexico
Malicia		Edward Gómez Granada	Mexico
Alice		Gabriel Novis	Brazil
Músicas		Lila Avilés	Mexico
Barbed Wire	Arame Farpado	Gustavo de Carvalho	Brazil
Flying Carpet	Tapete Voador	Justin Amorim	Portugal
Te Prometo Violencia		Juan Maria Leon	Mexico
La Miel Inmaculada		Mauricio Calderón Rico	Mexico
Sólo Kim		Javier Prieto de Paula, Diego Herrero	Spain
El Paso		Roberto Tarazona	Cuba
El Lagarto de la 20		Ricardo Soto	Mexico
De Sucre		Clàudia Cedó	Spain
My Mother is a Cow	Minha Mãe é uma Vaca	Moara Passoni	Brazil
Furia		Fran Moreno Blanco, Santi Pujol Amat	Spain
Aigua Salina		Abraham Delgado, Ivet Moreno	Spain
Semillas de Kivu		Néstor López, Carlos Valle	Spain
Someday the Night Will Come	Un día llegará la noche	Chica Barbosa	Mexico, Spain
Atardecer en América		Matías Rojas Valencia	Brazil, Chile, Colombia
Las Voces del Despeñadero		Irving Serrano, Victor Rejón	Mexico
Año de Casados		Pablo Camargo López	Mexico

(HeJ) indicates film eligible for the Hecho en Jalisco Award.

=== International Animation Feature Film ===
Highlighted title indicates section's best film winner.

English Title	Original Title	Director(s)	Production countrie(s)
Space Cadet		Kid Koala	Canada
Lesbian Space Princess (MG)		Emma Hough Hobbs, Leela Varghese	Australia
Endless Cookie		Seth Scriver	Canada
The Great History of Western Philosophy	La gran historia de la filosofía occidental	Aria Covamonas	Mexico
I Am Frankelda (opening film)	Soy Frankelda	Roy Ambriz, Arturo Ambriz	Mexico
Maya, Give Me a Title	Maya, donne-moi un titre	Michel Gondry	France
Olivia & the Clouds	Olivia & Las Nubes	Tomás Pichardo Espaillat	Dominican Republic
Pig That Survived Foot-and-Mouth Disease	구제역에서 살아 돌아온 돼지	Bum-Wook Hur	South Korea

(MG) indicates eligible for the Maguey Award, for films that include LGBTQ+ themes.

=== Maguey Award ===
The following list consists of the films eligible for the Maguey Award that are not listed in the previous competition tables. The films in contention for both the Maguey Award and other competition section appear with the symbol (MG) next to it.

Highlighted title indicates section's best film winner.

English Title	Original Title	Director(s)	Production countrie(s)
La Joia: Bad Gyal		David Camarero	Spain
Hot Milk		Rebecca Lenkiewicz	United Kingdom
Queer as Punk		Yihwen Chen	Malaysia, Indonesia
Cactus Pears	Sabar Bonda	Rohan Parashuram Kanawade	India, United Kingdom, Canada
Siempre Vuelven		Sergio De León	Uruguay, Argentina
The Nature of Invisible Things	A natureza das coisas invisíveis	Rafaela Camelo	Brazil, Chile
Only Good Things	Apenas coisas boas	Daniel Nolasco	Brazil
Sobre las Olas (HeJ)		Horacio Alcalá	Mexico, Spain, France
Llueve sobre Babel		Gala del Sol	Colombia, Spain, United States
Two Times João Liberada	Duas vezes João Liberada	Paula Tomás Marques	Portugal

(HeJ) indicates film eligible for the Hecho en Jalisco Award.

=== Cine de Género ===
Highlighted title indicates section's best film winner.

English Title	Original Title	Director(s)	Production countrie(s)
El Tema del Verano		Pablo Stoll	Uruguay, Argentina, Chile
Don't Leave the Kids Alone	No Dejes a los Niños Solos	Emilio Portes	Mexico
Restless Waters, Shivering Lights	Faro	Ángeles Hernández	Spain, Argentina
The Innocents (MG)	Los Inocentes	Germán Tejada	Mexico, Peru
A Yard of Jackals	Patio de Chacales	Diego Figueroa	Chile

(MG) indicates eligible for the Maguey Award, for films that include LGBTQ+ themes.

=== Rigo Mora Award ===
Highlighted title indicates section's best film winner.

English Title	Original Title	Director(s)	Production countrie(s)
Nabu		Joanna Rusinek	Poland
Retirement Plan		John Kelly	Ireland
Underground Invaders		Shera Courtalhac, Ines Molinier, Victor Lesaffre, Maëlle Metaireau, Dana Guyot, Ines Dolivet, Meggie Bernier	France
Dragfox		Lisa Ott	United Kingdom
Two Ships		McKinley Benson	Portugal, United States
Il Burattino e la Balena		Roberto Catani	France, Italy
Jeanne & Jean Jean	Jeanne et Jean Jean	Thanys Martin	France
Snow Bear		Aaron Blaise	United States
My Gut Friend		Becho y Mab	Argentina, Mexico
Como si la Tierra se las Hubiera Tragado		Natalia León	France
Luz Diabla		Gervasio Canda, Patricio Patricio, Paula Boffo	Argentina, Canada
The Little Ancestor	La petite ancêtre	Alexa Tremblay-Francoeur	Canada
Buffet Paraíso		Héctor Zafra, Santi Amézqueta	Spain, France
See You Soon (HeJ)	Hasta Pronto	Jennifer Skarbnik López	Mexico
Sisowath Quay	Quai Sisowath	Stéphanie Lansaque, François Leroy	France

(HeJ) indicates film eligible for the Hecho en Jalisco Award.

=== Socio-Environmental Cinema Award ===
The following list consists of the films eligible for the Socio-Environmental Cinema Award that are not listed in the previous competition tables.

Highlighted title indicates section's best film winner.

English Title	Original Title	Director(s)	Production countrie(s)
Seeds		Brittany Shyne	United States
The Mountain Won't Move	Мојот летен распуст	Petra Seliškar	Slovenia, Macedonia, France
Only on Earth		Robin Petré	Denmark, Spain
The Red List		Ross Pierson	United Kingdom
The Shepherd and the Bear		Max Keegan	United States, United Kingdom, France
The Memory of Butterflies	La memoria de las mariposas	Tatiana Fuentes Sadowski	Peru, Portugal

=== Hecho en Jalisco ===
The following list consists of the films eligible for the Hecho en Jalisco that are not listed in the previous competition tables. The films in contention for both the Made in Jalisco and other competition section appear with the symbol (HeJ) next to it.

Highlighted title indicates section's best film winner.

English Title	Original Title	Director(s)	Production countrie(s)
Gamboa		Emiliano Alcaraz Díaz	Mexico
Duva		Jonathan Álvarez Peña	Mexico
Abracadáver		Pancho Rodríguez	Mexico
Across the Breakwater	Entre las Rocas y el Mar	Alessandra Vera Gonzalez	Mexico
Una Torreta en Llamas		Humberto Flores Jáuregui	Mexico
Carbon	Carbono	Alberto Arvizu, Yael González	Mexico, Peru
Ceremonia		Dan Chávez	Mexico
Hijos del Agave		Iván López-Barba	Mexico
Cangrejos en el Aire		Esteban Guerrero Carranco	Mexico
The Daughters of the Wind	Las Hijas del Viento	José Camacho Cabrera	Mexico
The Diver Who Stayed on Land	El Buzo Que se Quedó en Tierra	Diana Castro Cabrera, Magali Espinosa Ortega	Mexico
La Mosca en la Pared		Mar Novo	Mexico
No, Gracias, Ya No Fumo		Diego Toussaint	Mexico
Secret Theatre	Teatro Secreto	Diego Martínez Gutiérrez	Mexico
Silenciados		Daniel Malvido	Mexico
Somewhere Within Me (MG)	En Algún Lugar Dentro de Mí	Andoeni Padilla	Mexico
Pisadas de Sangre		Emiliano Monroy Pineda	Mexico
Until God Remember Us	Hasta Que Dios se Acuerde de Nosotros	André González Arias, Victor Cartas Valdivia, Isabella Hernández Sánchez	Mexico

== Other sections ==
=== Charity Galas ===
English Title	Original Title	Director(s)	Production countrie(s)
8		Julio Medem	Spain
On Swift Horses		Daniel Minahan	United States
The Life of Chuck		Mike Flanagan	United States
Mollusk	Molusco	Mauricio Bidault	Mexico
Maguey Lifetime Achievement Award: Denisse Guerrero
The Fantasy Died (MG)	Murió la Fantasia	Rubén R. Bañuelos, Iván López Barba	Mexico

(MG) indicates eligible for the Maguey Award, for films that include LGBTQ+ themes.

=== Guadalajara Construye ===
English Title	Original Title	Director(s)	Production countrie(s)
8 Maneras de Morir		Mar Novo	Mexico
Génesis		Magaly Ugarte de Pablo	Mexico
Tierras Niñas		Zara Monardes	Chile
Aquí Hay Dragones		Iria Gómez Concheiro	Mexico, Chile
O Monstro		Germano Teixeira de Oliveira	Brazil
Los Nadadores		Sol Iglesias SK	Argentina
Aquella Sombra Desvanecía		Samuel Urbina	Peru

=== Cinema Libre ===
English Title	Original Title	Director(s)	Production countrie(s)
Rogéria (2024)		Salvador Gil	Portugal
The Mourning Of (2024)		Merced Elizondo	United States
Flores Amarillas (2024)		Jessica Arzate, Kim Caicedo	United States
Asesinos de la Lucha Libre (1962)		Manuel Muñoz Rodríguez	Mexico
Azi (2024)		Montana Mann	United States
Kundalini (2023) (MG)		Gavb Real	Mexico
Ily, Bye (2024)		Taylor James	United States
Ecstacy (2023)		Carolina Costa	Mexico
Concerto for Other Hands (2024)	Concierto para otras manos	Ernesto González Díaz	Mexico
Flamingos: Life After the Meteorite (2024)		Lorenzo Hagerman	Mexico
Santo and Blue Demon vs. the Monsters (1970)	Santo y Blue Demon contra los monstruos	Gilberto Martínez Solares	Mexico
The Shell Covered Ox (2024)	Boi de Conchas	Daniel Barosa	Brazil, United States

=== Son de Cine In-Edit ===
English Title	Original Title	Director(s)	Production countrie(s)
ZEF: The Story of Die Antwoord (2024)		Jon Day	South Africa
Turnstile: Never Enough (2025)		Brendan Yates, Pat McCrory	United States
Salsa Lives (2025)	La salsa vive	Juan Carvajal	Colombia, United States
A Song for My Land (2024)	Una canción para mi tierra	Mauricio Albornoz Iniesta	Argentina, Colombia, Germany
The Water Eyed Boy (2024)	O Menino D'Olho D'Água	Lírio Ferreira, Carolina Sá	Brazil

=== Imágenes Restauradas ===
English Title	Original Title	Director(s)	Production countrie(s)
Onda Nova (1983)		Ícaro "Francisco C" Martins, José Antonio Garcia	Brazil
Solo Sunny (1980)		Konrad Wolf, Wolfgang Kohlhaase	East Germany

=== Portugal, Guest of Honor ===
English Title	Original Title	Director(s)	Production countrie(s)
Alma Viva (2022)		Cristèle Alves Meira	Portugal
Balane 3 (2025)		Ico Costa	Portugal, France
Down to Earth (1995)	Casa de Lava	Pedro Costa	Portugal, France, Germany
Francisca (1981)		Manoel de Oliveira	Portugal
Gentle Women (2025)	Damas	Cláudia Alves	Portugal
Lisbon Story (1994)	O Céu de Lisboa	Wim Wenders	Portugal, Germany
Maria do Mar (1930)		Leitão de Barros	Portugal
The Nothing Factory (2017)	A Fábrica de Nada	Pedro Pinho	Portugal
Kali the Little Vampire (2012)	Kali, Le Petit Vampire	Regina Pessoa	France, Portugal, Canada, Switzerland
Nayola (2022)		José Miguel Ribeiro	Portugal
Torre Bela (1975)		Thomas Harlan	Portugal, Italy
Trás-os-Montes (1976)		António Reis, Margarida Cordeiro	Portugal
Transe (2006)		Teresa Villaverde	Portugal, France
The Domain (2019)	A Herdade	Tiago Guedes	Portugal, France
The Jester (1987)	O Bobo	José Álvaro Morais	Portugal
The Green Years (1963)	Os Verdes Anos	Paulo Rocha	Portugal
The Metamorphosis of Birds (2020)	A Metamorfose dos Pássaros	Catarina Vasconcelos	Portugal
My Grandfather's Demons (2022)	Os Demónios do meu avô	Nuno Beato	Portugal, Spain, France
Mysteries of Lisbon (2010)	Mistérios de Lisboa	Raúl Ruiz	Portugal, France
Them, Fado Bicha (2024) (MG)	As Fado Bicha	Justine Lemahieu	Portugal
Tragic Story with Happy Ending (2005)	Histoire tragique avec fin heureuse	Regina Pessoa	Portugal, Canada, France
The Portuguese (2025)	Portugueses	Vicente Alves do Ó	Portugal
The Night (1999)	A Noite	Regina Pessoa	Portugal
A Portuguese Goodbye (1986)	Um Adeus Português	João Botelho	Portugal
Recollections of the Yellow House (1989)	Recordações da Casa Amarela	João César Monteiro	Portugal
A Woman's Revenge (2012)	A Vingança de uma Mulher	Rita Azevedo Gomes	Portugal
Uncle Thomas: Accounting for the Days (2019)	Tio Tomás, A Contabilidade Dos Dias	Regina Pessoa	Portugal, Canada, France
Homenaje Portugal, Guest of Honor: Maria de Medeiros
Silvestre (1981)		João César Monteiro	Portugal
April Captains (2000)	Capitães de Abril	Maria de Medeiros	Portugal
Moral Order (2020)	Ordem Moral	Mário Barroso	Portugal
The Portuguese House (2025)	Una quinta portuguesa	Avelina Prat	Portugal, Spain

=== Homenajes ===
English Title	Original Title	Director(s)	Production countrie(s)
Maguey Queer Icon Award: Daniela Vega
A Fantastic Woman (2017)	Una mujer fantástica	Sebastián Lelio	Chile
Silver Mayahuel Lifetime Achievement Award: Dolores Heredia
Chicuarotes (2019)		Gael García Bernal	Mexico
Little Saints (1999)	Santitos	Alejandro Springall	Mexico
Two Crimes (1994)	Dos crímenes	Roberto Sneider	Mexico
International Mayahuel Award: J. A. Bayona
The Impossible (2012)	Lo imposible	J. A. Bayona	Spain
The Orphanage (2007)	El orfanato	J. A. Bayona	Spain, Mexico
Society of the Snow (2023)	La sociedad de la nieve	J. A. Bayona	Spain
Mayahuel FICG Industry Award: Mónica Lozano
The Chosen (2016)	El elegido	Antonio Chavarrías	Spain, Mexico
I Dream in Another Language (2017)	Sueño en otro idioma	Ernesto Contreras	Mexico
Tear This Heart Out (2008)	Arráncame la vida	Roberto Sneider	Mexico

=== Series Showcase ===
English Title	Original Title	Director(s)	Production countrie(s)
Mentiras, la serie		Gabriel Ripstein	Mexico
Chespirito: Not Really on Purpose	Chespirito: Sin querer queriendo	Rodrigo Santos, Julián De Tavira, Leche Ruíz	Mexico
Hidden Island	Isla Oculta	Rodrigo Susarte	Chile
Marcial Maciel: The Wolf of God	Marcial Maciel: El lobo de Dios	Matías Gueilburt	Mexico
Paper Love (MG)	Amor de papel	Edu Cortés	Mexico

== Awards ==
The following awards were presented:

=== Mezcal Awards ===
- Best Film: Llamarse Olimpia by Indira Cato
  - Honorary Mention: Boca Vieja by Yovegami Ascona Mora
- Best Direction: Doce Lunas by Victoria Franco
- Best Performance: Emiliano Zurita for Rock, Weed and Wheels
- Best Cinematography: Sergio Armstrong for Doce Lunas
- Audience Award: Boca Vieja by Yovegami Ascona Mora

=== Ibero-American Fiction Feature Film ===
- Best Film: The Blue Trail by Gabriel Mascaro
- Best Direction: Eva Libertad for Deaf
- Best Performance: Shirley Cruz for The Best Mother in the World
- Best Screenplay: Anna Muylaert for The Best Mother in the World
- Best Cinematography: Lílis Soares for The Best Mother in the World
- Best First Film: Away by Gerard Oms

=== Ibero-American Documentary Film ===
- Best Film: Afternoons of Solitude by Albert Serra
- Best Direction: Misha Vallejo Prut for Eco de Luz
- Best Cinematography: Oriol Barcelona, Nauzet Gaspar, Àlvar Riu, Diego Trenas, Arnau Valls Colomer for The Flamenco Guitar of Yerai Cortés

=== Ibero-American Short Film ===
- Best Short Film: Las Voces del Despeñadero by Irving Serrano and Victor Rejón
  - Special Mention: De Sucre by Clàudia Cedó

=== Maguey Award ===
- Best Film: Cactus Pears by Rohan Parashuram Kanawade
  - Honorary Mention: Away by Gerard Oms
- Maguey Jury Award: Lesbian Space Princess by Leela Varghese and Emma Hough Hobbs
  - Maguey Jury Award (Honorary Mention): Un Mundo para Mí by Alejandro Zuno
- Best Performance: Denise Weinberg for The Blue Trail

=== Animated Film ===
- Best Animated Feature Film: Olivia & the Clouds by Tomás Pichardo Espaillat
  - Special Mention: Endless Cookie by Seth Scriver and Peter Scriver

=== Rigo Mora Award ===
- Best Animated Short Film: Luz Diabla by Gervasio Canda, Patricio Patricio and Paula Boffo
  - Special Mention: Retirement Plan by John Kelly

=== Hecho en Jalisco ===
- Best Film: No, Gracias, Ya No Fumo by Diego Toussaint
  - Best Film – Special Mention: The Daughters of the Wind by José Camacho Cabrera
- Best Short Film: La Mosca en la Pared by Mar Novo
  - Best Short Film – Special Mention: See You Soon by Jennifer Skarbnik López

=== Socio-Environmental Cinema Award ===
- Best Film: The Mountain Won't Move by Petra Seliškar

=== Other awards ===
- Young Jury Award for Best Mexican Film: Boca Vieja by Yovegami Ascona Mora
- Cine de Género – Best Film: The Innocents by Germán Tejada
- FEISAL Award: A Yard of Jackals by Diego Figueroa
- FIPRESCI Award: At the End of the World by Abraham Escobedo-Salas
- Latin American Critics' Award for European Films: Deaf by Eva Libertad
