= Portuguese animation =

Animation created in Portugal

Portuguese animation (Portuguese: Animação portuguesa) is animation created in Portugal or by Portuguese animators.

== History ==
In 2013, Kali, o pequeno vampiro won the award for Best Animated Short Film at the 2013 Sophia Awards. In 2014, O gigante was nominated for Best Animated Short Film at the 28th Goya Awards.

== Animators ==
- João Fazenda
- Abi Feijó
- Isabel Aboim Inglez
- Regina Pessoa
- Cláudio Sá
- João Gonzalez
- José Miguel Ribeiro

== Awards ==
- Sophia Award for Best Animated Short Film

== Festivals ==
- Cinanima
- Monstra

== Works ==
- Midsummer Dream
- Até ao tecto do mundo
- Do céu e da terra
- Tragic Story with Happy Ending
- Kali, o pequeno vampiro
- Lágrimas de um palhaço
- Sem querer
- Nutri Ventures – The Quest for the 7 Kingdoms
- O gigante

== See also ==
- Portuguese comics
