= Portuguese comics =

Comics originating in Portugal

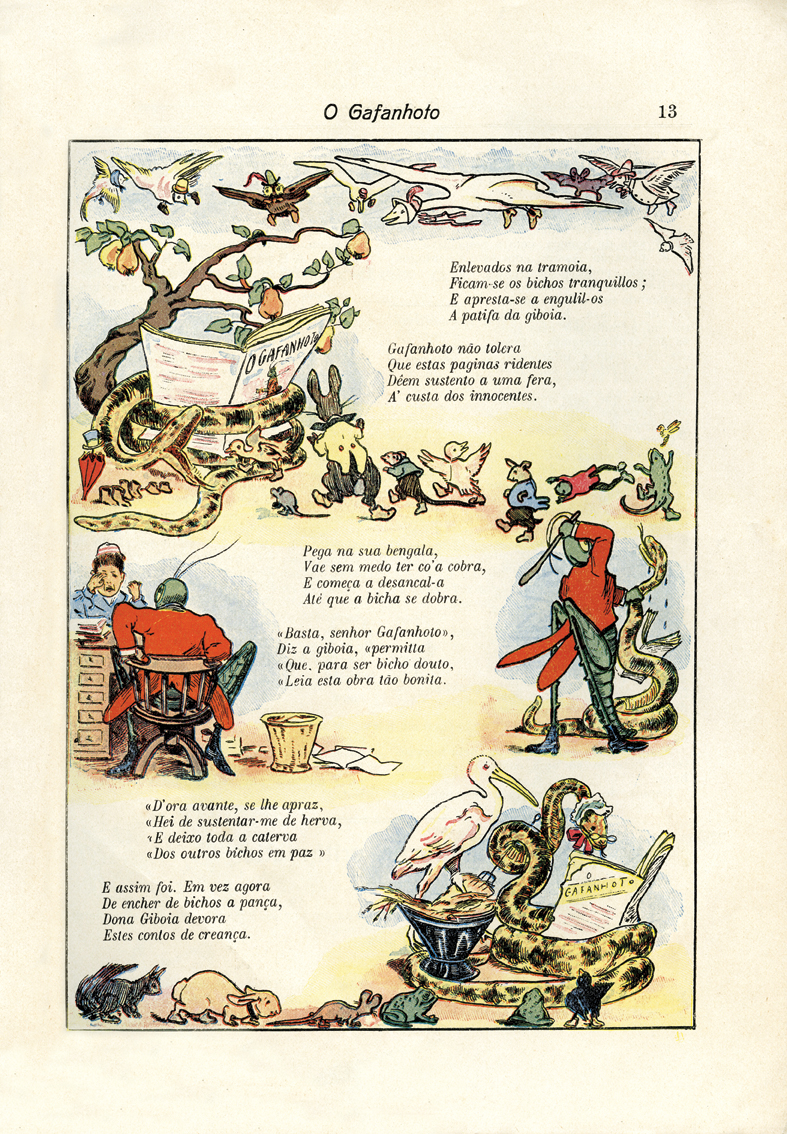
- A page from O Gafanhoto comic magazine (1910).
- Earliest publications: 1872
- Publishers: Kingpin Books; El Pep; Polvo
- Publications: A fórmula da felicidade Hans, o cavalo cansado Kuroneko; Março Anormal; The Positives
- Creators: Rafael Bordalo Pinheiro; Carlos Botelho; João Abel Manta; Eduardo Teixeira Coelho; Carlos Roque
- Series and characters: "Banzai" "O Gafanhoto" "O Mosquito" "Zé Povinho" "Tom Vitoin"
- Languages: Portuguese

Related articles

Portuguese comics (Portuguese: Banda desenhada portuguesa) are comics created in Portugal or by Portuguese authors. Rafael Bordalo Pinheiro, Carlos Botelho, and João Abel Manta are some of the most notable early Portuguese cartoonists.

== History ==
The first Portuguese comic book was possibly Apontamentos de Raphael Bordallo Pinheiro Sobre a Picaresca Viagem do Imperador de Rasilb pela Europa (1872), by Rafael Bordalo Pinheiro. Pinheiro later created Zé Povinho, the cartoon character of a Portuguese everyman. Zé Povinho became first a symbol of the Portuguese working-class people, and eventually into the unofficial personification of Portugal. Between 1926 and 1929 Pinheiro regularly drew comic strips for the children's weekly ABCzinho, "and is the author of almost the entire front and back pages of each issue, in color".

In 1928, Carlos Botelho started a comics page in the weekly publication Sempre Fixe, a collaboration that he maintained for over 22 years and which was the stage for a caustic criticism of a vast range of issues, going from trivial matters of daily life in Lisbon to some of the most relevant events in international life, in a "style that mixed up chronicle, autobiography, journalism, and satire," making it an early example of autobiographical comics. On 8 December 1950, the date when Botelho ended that monumental cycle of work, his Ecos da Semana ("Echoes of the Week") made a total of about 1,200 pages, "in a continuous discourse with no intervals or holidays". "Ecos da Semana are a double, and triple, diary – of the author, between his 29 and 51 years of age, and of a country, or of a world."

João Abel Manta is of particular importance in the area of the cartoon, and is considered to be "the most extraordinary case of Portuguese cartoon drawing of [the 20th century], only comparable [to] Bordalo Pinheiro himself". Manta's activity as a cartoonist was from approximately 1954 to 1991, being particularly intense between 1969 and 1976. For about seven years his cartoons — dealing critically and deeply ironically with Portuguese reality — were published regularly in newspapers like the Diário de Lisboa, Diário de Notícias, and O Jornal. Manta's cartoons marked the period before the 25th of April (revolution) with their unique and meticulous graphic quality. He questioned the identity of a country in turmoil in drawings such as A Difficult Problem, where a group of outstanding figures from the past – from Karl Marx to Trotsky and Sartre – stare inquisitively at a small map of Portugal on a blackboard. Manta "will be associated in a very particular way to the best and worst that we lived through in Portugal during those years."

== Authors ==
- Filipe Abranches
- Carlos Botelho (1889–1982)
- Richard Câmara
- Eduardo Teixeira Coelho (1919–2005)
- Diniz Conefrey
- Cristina Dias
- Nuno Duarte
- João Fazenda
- Joana Rosa Fernandes
- António Jorge Gonçalves
- André Lemos
- João M. P. Lemos
- Isabel Lobinho
- João Abel Manta (b. 1928)
- Filipe Melo (b. 1977)
- Marco Mendes (b. 1978)
- Rafael Bordalo Pinheiro (1846–1905)
- Miguel Rocha
- Carlos Roque (1936–2006)
- Nuno Saraiva
- Cátia Serrão
- João Tércio
- Pedro Zamith
- Carlos Zingaro (b. 1948)

== Works ==
- The Adventures of Dog Mendonça & Pizzaboy
- A fórmula da felicidade
- Hans, o cavalo cansado
- Kuroneko
- Março Anormal
- The Positives
- TMG - The Mighty Gang

== Magazines ==
- Banzai
- O Gafanhoto
- O Mosquito

== Characters ==
- Zé Povinho
- Tom Vitoin

== Publishers ==
- Chili Com Carne
- Edições Devir
- El Pep
- Goody
- Kingpin Books
- Levoir
- Planeta
- Polvo

== Festivals ==
- Comic Con Portugal — held in Porto
- Amadora BD — Festival Internacional de Banda Desenhada; held annually since 1990
- Festival de BD de Beja

== See also ==
- Portuguese animation
