= Loews Cineplex Entertainment =

American theater chain

Loews Cineplex Theatres Inc.
- Formerly: Loew's, Inc. (1904–1969); Loews Inc. (1969–1985); Loews Theatre Management Corporation (1985–1994); Sony Theatres (1994–1996); Loews Theatres (1996–1998); Loews Cineplex Entertainment Corporation (1998–2002)
- Type: Subsidiary (1924–2006); Name-only brand (2006–2017)
- Traded as: NYSE: LCP
- Industry: Entertainment
- Founded: June 23, 1904; 122 years ago (original); May 14, 1998; 28 years ago
- Founder: Marcus Loew (for the Loews Incorporated branch)
- Defunct: November 2003; 23 years ago (Canada); January 26, 2006; 20 years ago (United States)
- Fate: Merged into AMC Theatres; (Canadian operations merged with Galaxy Entertainment, which later became Cineplex Entertainment)
- Successors: AMC Theatres; Cineplex Entertainment
- Headquarters: New York City, US
- Areas served: North America; South Korea; Spain
- Key people: Lawrence J. Ruisi (president and CEO); Allen Karp (chairman and CEO, Cineplex Odeon Corp.)
- Parent: Loews Corporation (1959–1985); Perenchio Pictures (1985–1986); Tri-Star Pictures (1986–1987); Columbia Pictures Entertainment (1987–1989); Sony (1989–2002); Seagram (1998–2000); Vivendi Universal (2000–2002); Onex Corporation (2002–2011); Cineplex Inc. (2003–present, Canada); AMC Theatres (2006–present, U.S.)
- Divisions: Loews Theatres; Cineplex Odeon Cinemas; Magic Johnson Theatres; Star Theatres
- Subsidiaries: Cineplex Odeon Corporation; Cinemex; MEGABOX; Yelmo Cineplex
- Website: amctheatres.com (US) cineplex.com (Canada)

Loews Cineplex Entertainment, formerly known as Loew's, Inc., was an American movie theater chain operating in North America.

The company was originally named "Loew's" after its founder Marcus Loew. In 1959, when the Tisch brothers acquired the company, it became known as "Loews". The company merged with Canadian-based Cineplex Odeon Corporation in 1998, but went bankrupt in 2001. The company merged with AMC Theatres on January 26, 2006, while the Canadian operations merged with Cineplex Galaxy in 2003.

The Loews Theatres name remained in use until 2017, when AMC simplified its branding following the acquisition of Carmike Cinemas, reorganizing its operations into three divisions: AMC, AMC Classic, and AMC Dine-In. Prior to its discontinuation, Loews Cineplex operated theatres under a number of brand names that reflected different ownership periods and regional markets, including Loews Theatres, Cineplex Odeon, Star Theatres, Magic Johnson Theatres, Cinemex, and MEGABOX. The company maintained corporate offices in New York City and Toronto.

From 1924 to 1959, Metro-Goldwyn-Mayer Studios (MGM) was its sibling company until it sold its controlling interest in Loew's Theatres to the Tisch brothers. Later, this company was jointly owned by Sony Pictures and Universal Studios. It operated theaters in the United States, Canada, South Korea, Spain, and Mexico.

== History ==
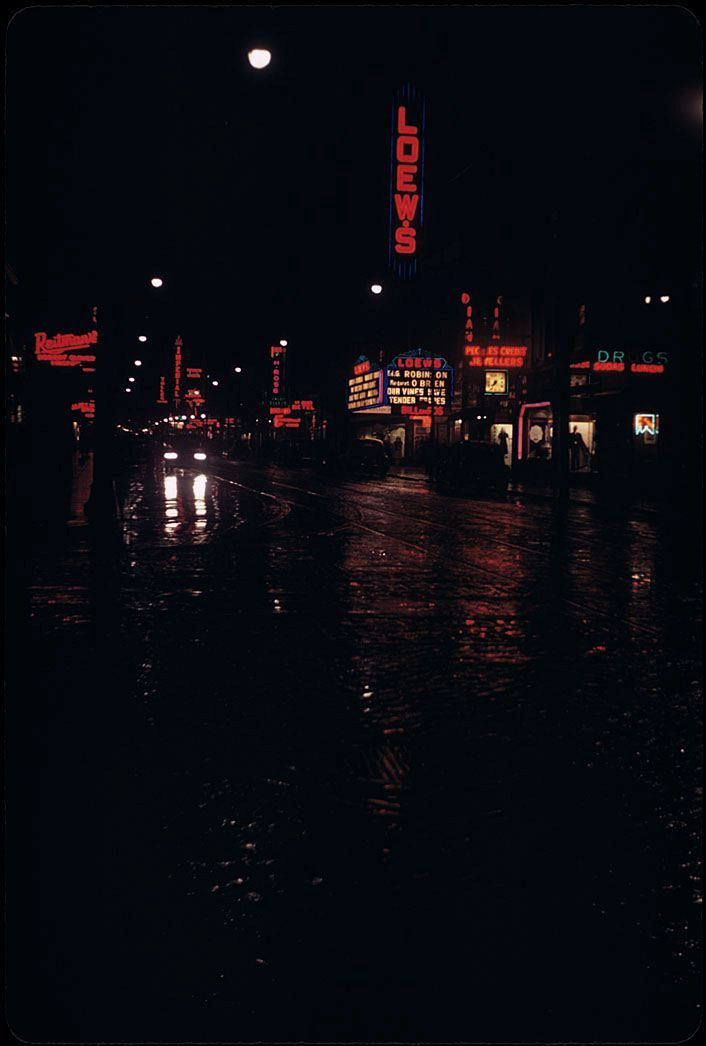
Loew's Theatre in Toronto, Canada, in 1945

Loew's Theatres Incorporated was formed in 1904 in Cincinnati, Ohio, by entrepreneur Marcus Loew. Loew founded a chain of nickelodeon theaters which showed short silent films in storefront locations. Soon the company opened vaudeville houses and movie palaces. Loew's theaters were found in cities throughout the United States, but primarily in East Coast and Midwest states.

To provide films for his theaters, Loew founded Metro-Goldwyn-Mayer (MGM) in 1924, by merging the earlier firms Metro Pictures, Goldwyn Pictures, and Louis B. Mayer Productions. Loew's Incorporated served as the distribution arm and parent company for the studio until the two were separated by the 1948 U.S. Supreme Court ruling United States v. Paramount Pictures, Inc. The two companies officially split in 1959.

Loews Corporation, the successor company to the original firm founded by Marcus Loew, announced on April 9, 1985, that it was negotiating to sell Loews Theatres to a group headed by A. Jerrold Perenchio. Loews Corporation by this time was a holding company owned by brothers Robert and Laurence Tisch that specialized in hotels and insurance. Perenchio completed the acquisition for $160 million on July 11.

On October 20, 1986, when federal regulations had been relaxed, Tri-Star Pictures, then a joint venture co-owned by The Coca-Cola Company (also owners of Columbia Pictures at the time) and Time Inc.'s HBO, entered an agreement to acquire Loews Theatre Management Corporation for $300 million; Tri-Star closed the acquisition in December. HBO left Tri-Star, which merged with Columbia Pictures in 1987, resulting in the formation of Columbia Pictures Entertainment.

On May 26, 1987, Tri-Star announced plans to expand the 300-screen chain over the following year and a half through acquisitions and new theatre construction. On January 25, 1988, Columbia agreed to acquire USA Cinemas Inc., with 325 screens, for $165 million; the acquisition was closed on March 2. Later in 1988, Loews bought 48 screens in the Washington, D.C. area from Roth Enterprises, M&R Theatres with 70 screens in the Chicago area, and JF Theatres, Inc. with 66 screens in the Baltimore area. Upon the full acquisition of Tri-Star by Columbia Pictures, and when Columbia Pictures Entertainment (now Sony Pictures Entertainment) was bought from Coca-Cola by Sony in 1989, Sony inherited the theaters.

On April 19, 1994, Loews announced it would change its name to Sony Theatres. On April 27, Sony partnered with basketball player Magic Johnson to form Magic Johnson Theatres, a mini-chain of theaters specifically geared toward the inner cities, particularly in Los Angeles. A year before, Sony Dynamic Digital Sound was installed in several theatres, since the parent company used it to promote Sony's cinema sound division, which eventually shut down in 2002. Sony Theatres began reverting to the Loews Theatres name in October 1996.

In September 1997, Cineplex Odeon Corporation announced that it would merge with Loews Theatres for $1 billion. The merger was approved by the United States Department of Justice on April 16, 1998, and was completed later that year to form Loews Cineplex Entertainment, thus making it a joint venture between Sony and Universal Studios. The combined company had theatres in the United States, Canada, Mexico, South Korea, and Spain. The company sold off its newly acquired subsidiary, Cineplex Odeon Films, to Alliance Atlantis, which was formed from the merger of Alliance Entertainment Corporation and Atlantis Communications that year. In 2001 the company declared Chapter 11 bankruptcy. Among the changes was the closures of 46 theatres in North America including 21 Loews theatres in the U.S. and 25 Cineplex Odeon theatres in Canada.

In 2002, Onex Corporation and Oaktree Capital Management acquired Loews Cineplex from Sony and Universal and the company was filed for initial public offering (IPO). In 2004, they sold Loews to a private group of investors which included the Carlyle Group and Bain Capital. Onex retained the Canadian Loews Cineplex and merged it with Galaxy Cinemas to form Cineplex Galaxy Income Fund.

In 2005, AMC Theatres announced that it would merge with Loews Cineplex Entertainment and that the merged company would adopt the AMC name. At the time of the merger, Loews operated 198 theaters with 2,235 screens. Many theaters were rebranded as AMC Loews until the Loews name was phased out in 2017.

== Gallery ==
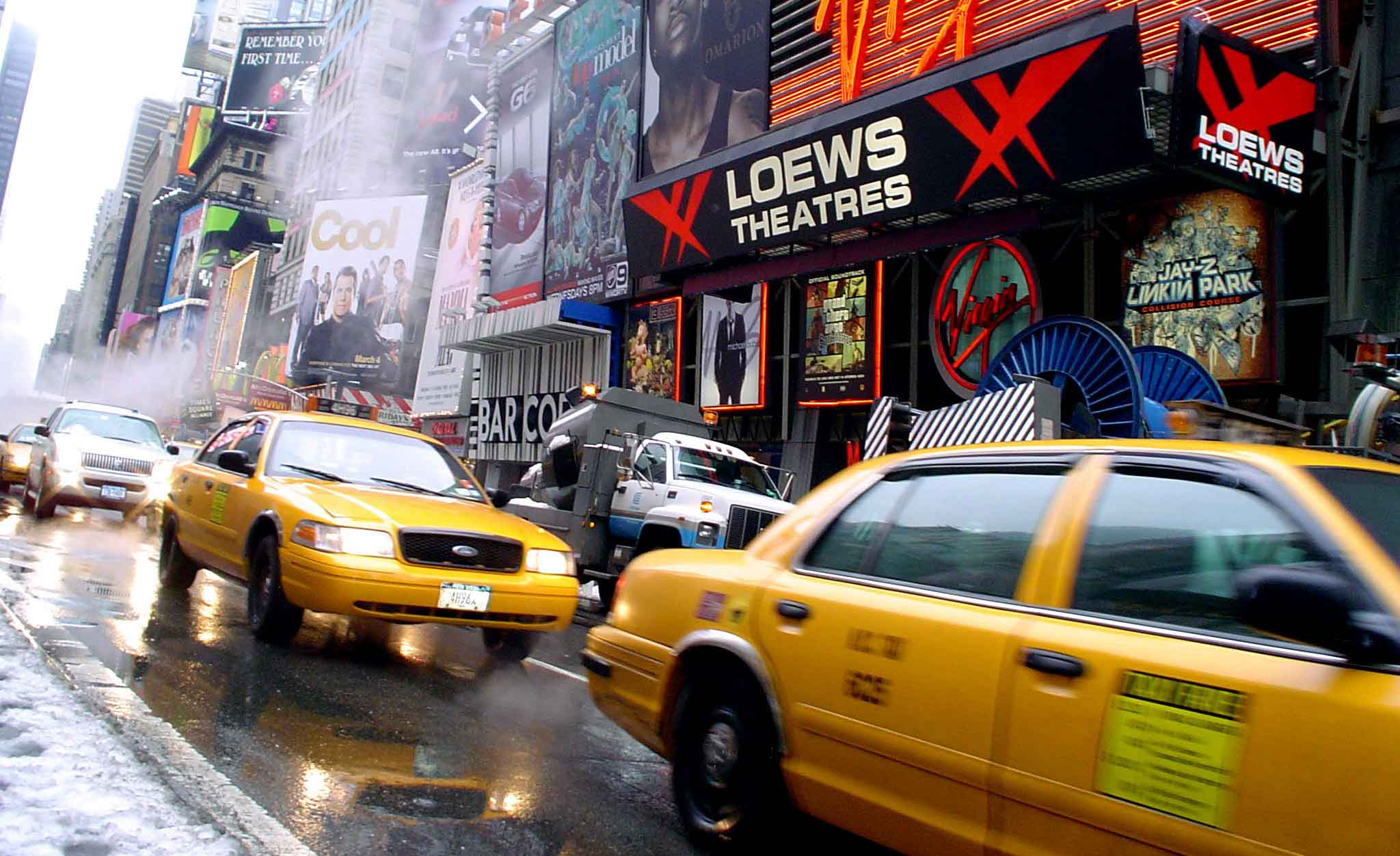
Loews Theatre, Times Square, New York City, 2005

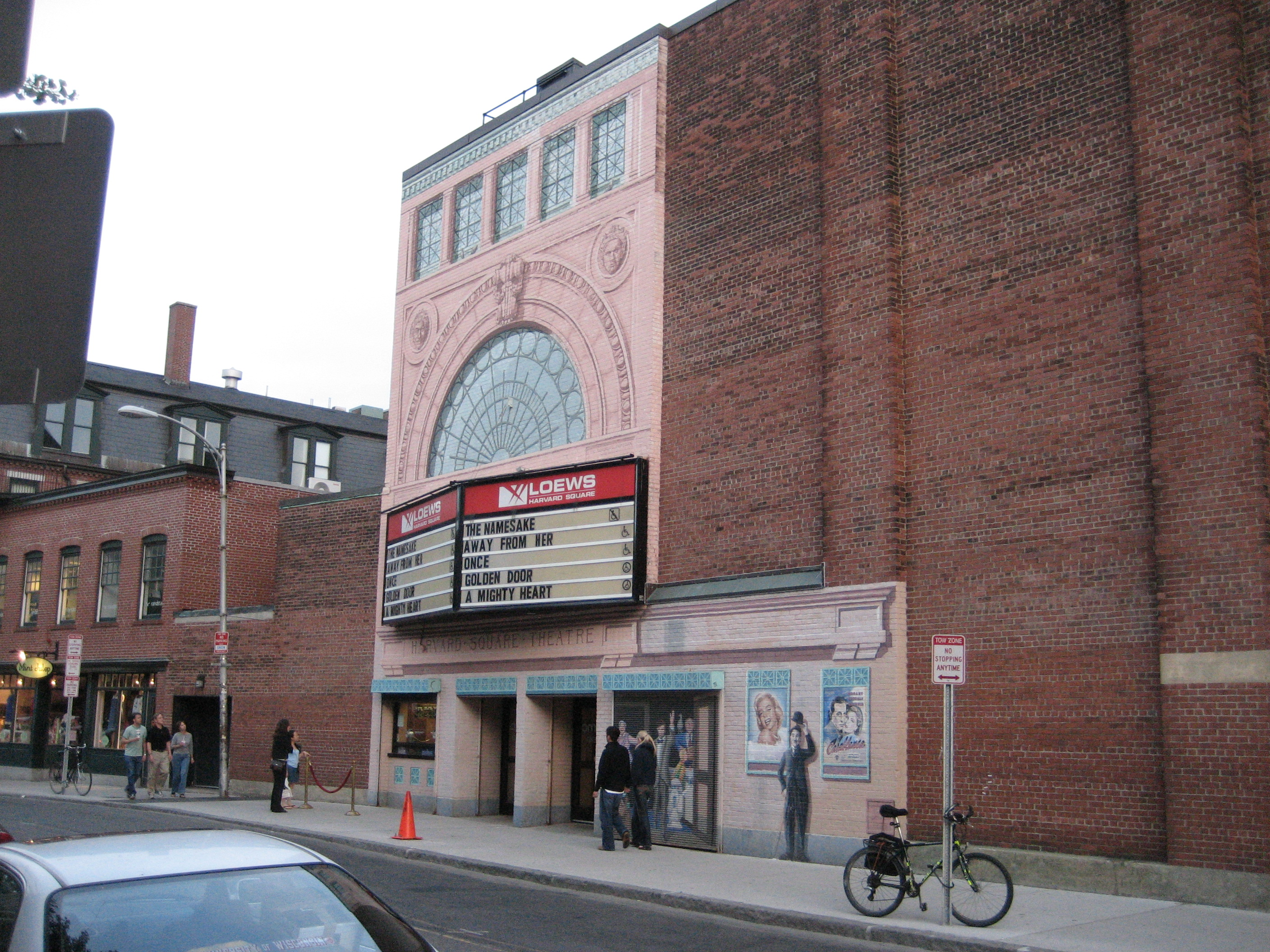
Loews Theatre in Harvard Square, Cambridge, Massachusetts, 2007

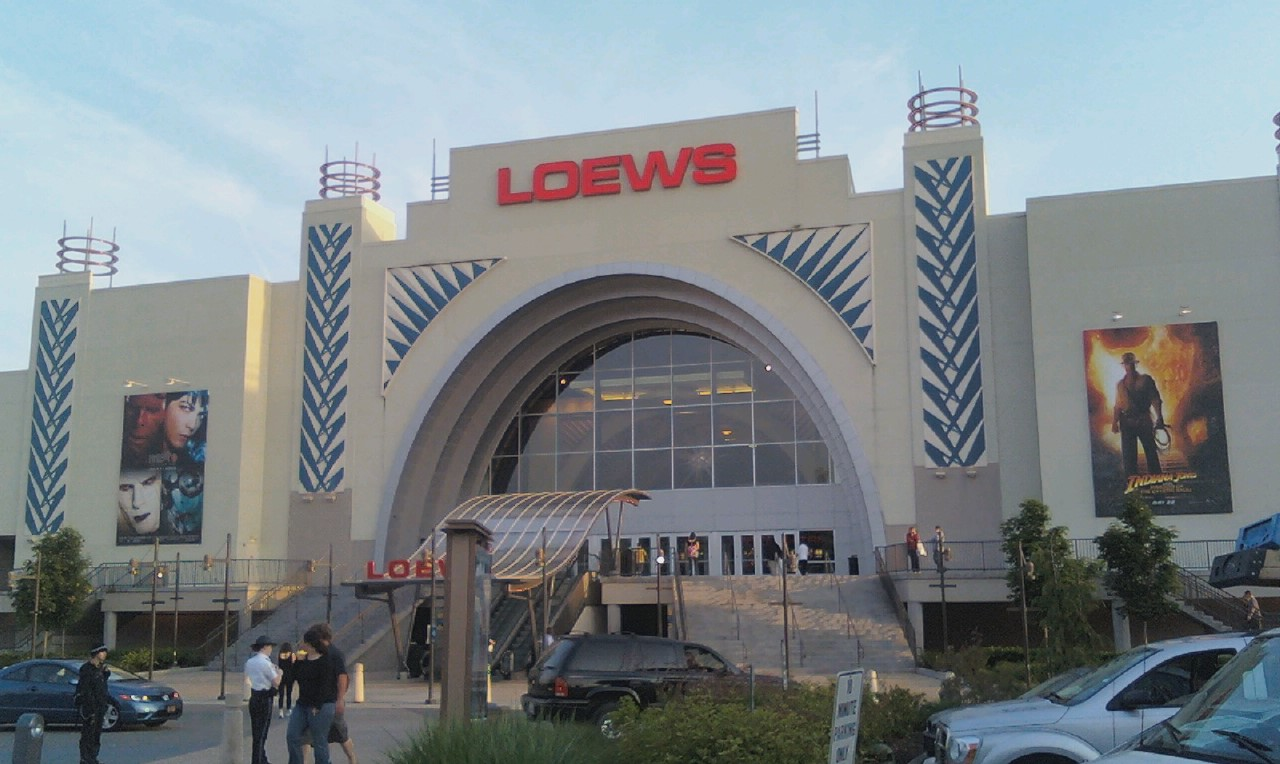
Loews Alderwood 16 in Lynnwood, Washington, opened in March 2005 before the merger with AMC Theatres

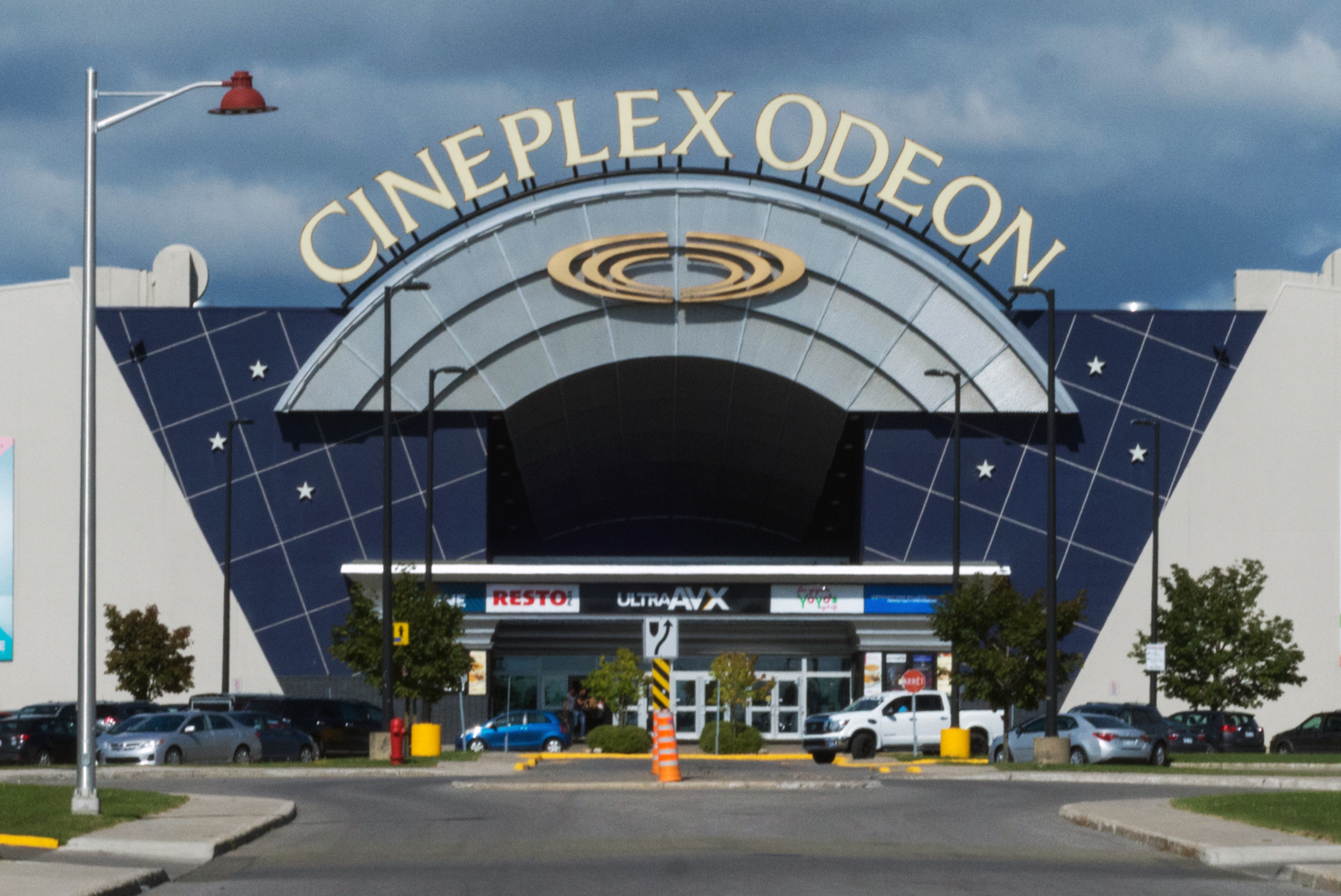
Cinéma Cineplex Odeon in Sainte-Foy, Quebec, was one of the Cineplex Odeon-branded theatres built by Loews Cineplex in Canada in the early 2000s prior to its merger by Galaxy Cinemas

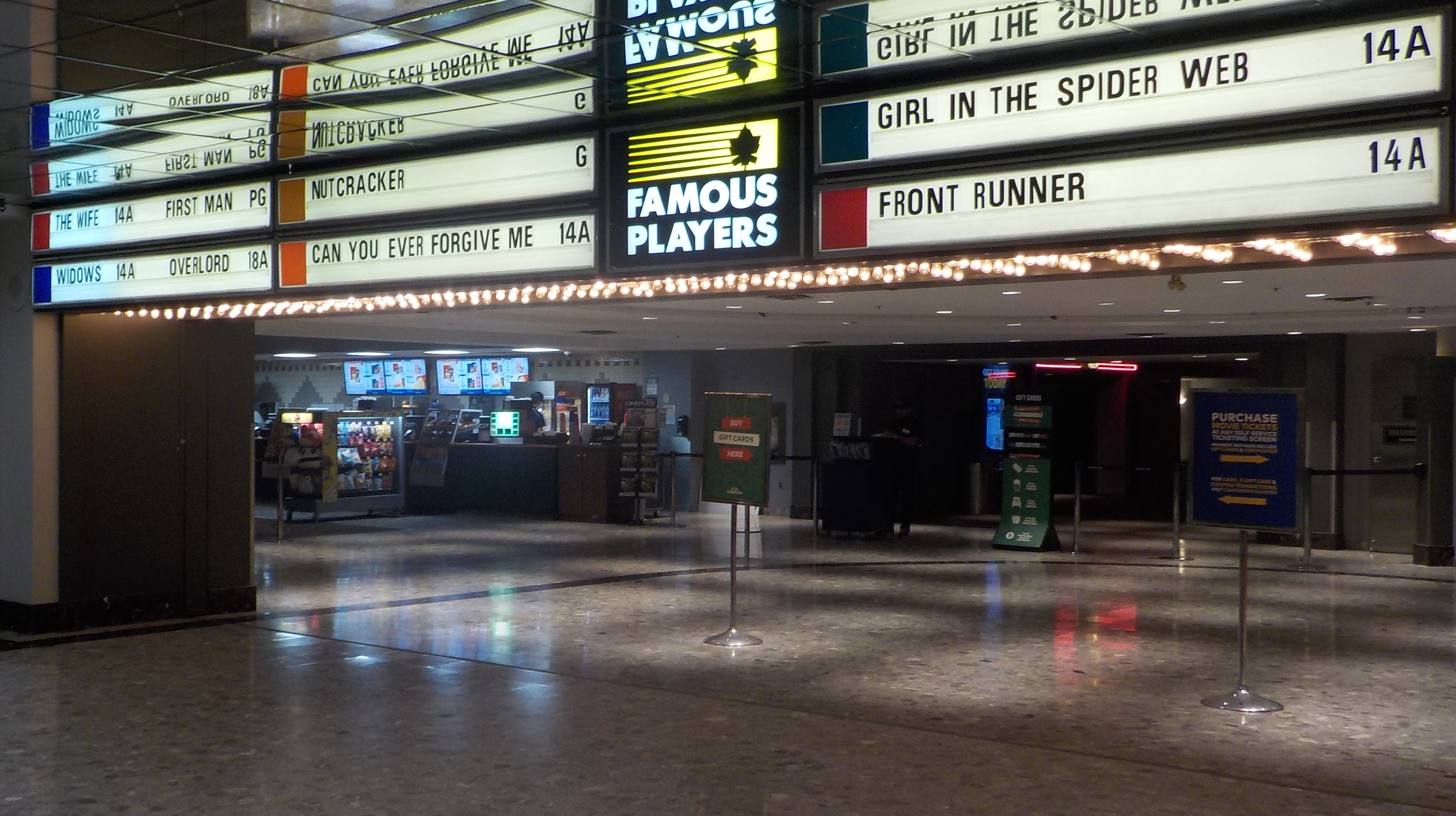
The former Cineplex Odeon Canada Square Cinemas in Yonge-Eglinton (Toronto) opened in 1985. Closed by Loews Cineplex in 2001 and was acquired by Famous Players due to space limitations at a nearby SilverCity.

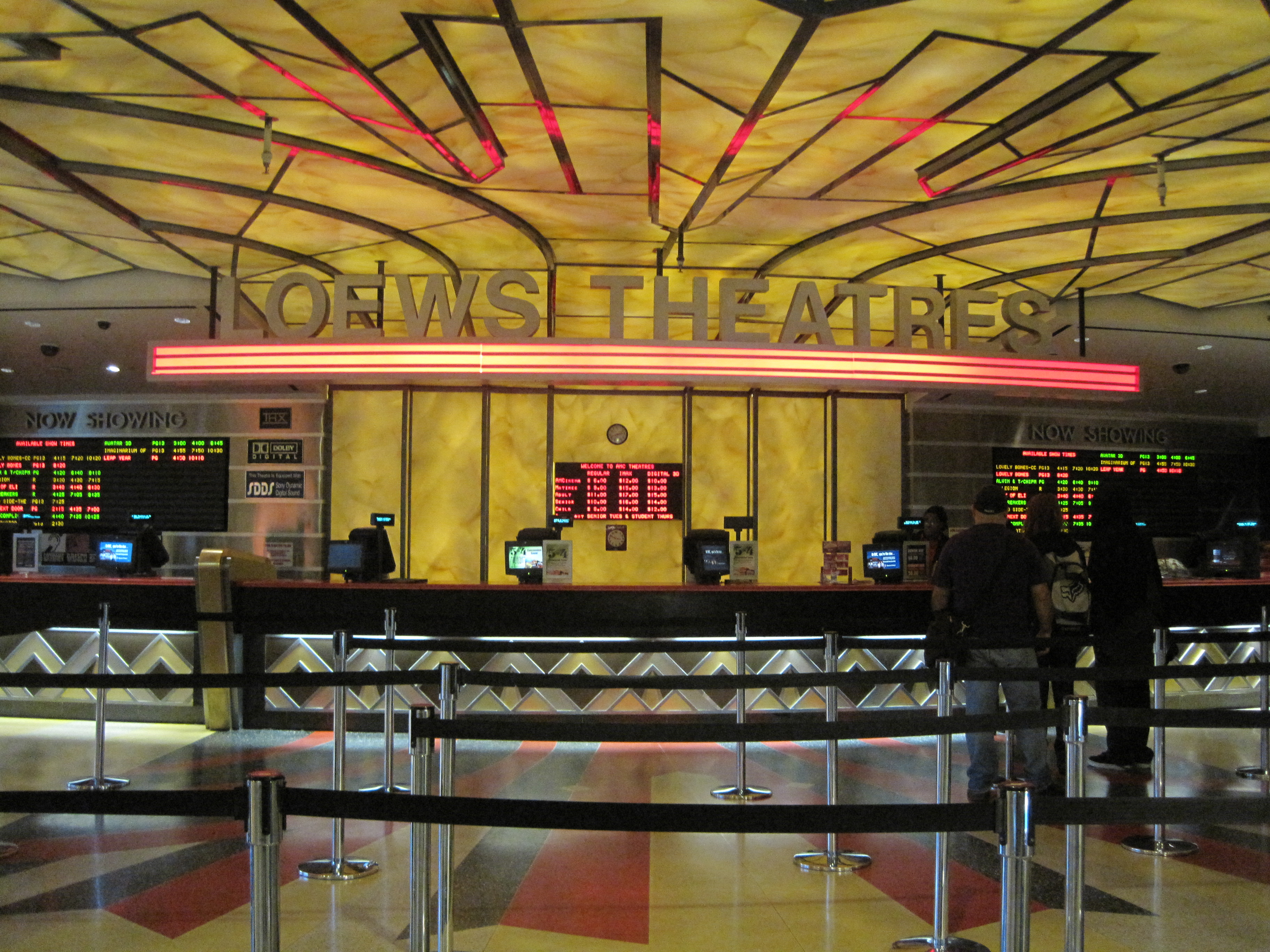
A Loews Theatre box office in Metreon, San Francisco

== See also ==
- Loew's Wonder Theaters
- United States v. Loew's Inc., a 1962 Supreme Court decision on block booking
- Cineplex Entertainment
