= Women Wearing Shoulder Pads =

Mexican animated television series

- Season 1 poster
- Genre: Adult animation; Comedy-drama
- Created by: Gonzalo Cordova
- Directed by: Ana Coronilla
- Countries of origin: Mexico; United States
- Original language: Spanish
- No. of seasons: 1
- No. of episodes: 8

Production
- Executive producers: Gonzalo Cordova; Arturo and Roy Ambriz
- Production companies: Cinema Fantasma; Tres Tristes Tigres; Williams Street

Original release
- Network: Adult Swim (United States); HBO Max (Mexico); Studiocanal (France and Spain)
- Release: 17 August – 28 September 2025

Women Wearing Shoulder Pads (Spanish: Mujeres con Hombreras) is an adult animated television series created by Gonzalo Cordova for Cartoon Network's nighttime programming block Adult Swim. It became the first Spanish language series in the block, airing on 17 August 2025. In Mexico, it airs exclusively on HBO Max.

At least 8 11-minute episodes have been made. An English-dubbed compilation film version of the series was released on HBO Max on 29 September 2025.

== Synopsis ==
Guinea pigs, called cuyes, are the size of cattle and serve the same purpose, grown for meat and used in "cuy-fights". Spanish entrepreneur Marioneta Negocios is on a collision course with Doña Quispe, a self-made businesswoman in Ecuador's cuy industry. The women's friends and relatives are swiftly drawn into this conflict.

== Voice cast ==
- Pepa Pallarés as Marioneta Negocios
- Laura Torres as Doña Quispe
- Kerygma Flores as Espada Muleta
- Nicole Vazquez as Nina Quispe
- Gabriela Cartol as Coquita Buenasuerte

== Episodes ==
| No. overall | No. in season | Title | Original release date | U.S. viewers (millions) |
|---|---|---|---|---|
| 1 | 1 | "Ámame Ódiame (Love Me, Hate Me)" | 17 August 2025 | 0.155 |
Marioneta wants to rebrand cuyes from a delectable delicacy to a cuddly companion. A mysterious stalker follows Marioneta, even trapping her in a closet.
| 2 | 2 | "¿Quieres? ¿Quieres? ¡Compra! (Do You Want This? Buy It!)" | 17 August 2025 | 0.097 |
Marioneta confronts her business rival, Doña Quispe, who runs the country's most famous restaurant and a chain of cuyes butcher shops.
| 3 | 3 | "Corazón Retorcido (Twisted Heart)" | 24 August 2025 | 0.135 |
Marioneta attends a meeting of animal rights activists in order to befriend a twelve-year-old girl named Nina Quispe, who is Doña's daughter.
| 4 | 4 | "El Cordón Umbilical (The Umbilical Cord)" | 31 August 2025 | N/A |
Marioneta wakes up in a warehouse, terrified and traumatized. She must overcome her fears to direct a TV commercial.
| 5 | 5 | "La Misma Noche Que Anoche (The Same Night as Last Night)" | 7 September 2025 | N/A |
Marioneta throws a New Year's Eve party which ends with an effigy of her being set ablaze.
| 6 | 6 | "Tres Tristes Tigres (Three Sad Tigers)" | 14 September 2025 | N/A |
Coquita, Espada, and Nina go on a road trip to Marioneta's cuy farm.
| 7 | 7 | "Madre Pródiga (Prodigal Mother)" | 21 September 2025 | N/A |
Coquita reveals the truth of her connection to Marioneta, to Nina's surprise and confusion. Meanwhile, Marioneta confronts her stalker.
| 8 | 8 | "Mami Mami Mami (Mommy Mommy Mommy)" | 28 September 2025 | N/A |
Nina is committed to making Marioneta pay for her crimes, even if it means kidnapping her.

== Production ==
=== Development ===
Cinema Fantasma had previously worked with Cartoon Network on Frankelda's Book of Spooks. After I Am Frankelda ended production, the series was developed and picked up by the network's nighttime programming block Adult Swim. The series was announced and showcased at the New York Comic Con on 12 October 2023. It marks the first Spanish-language project for the programming block.

== Reception ==
On the review aggregator website Rotten Tomatoes, 100% of the seventeen critics' reviews are positive.
