= Frankelda's Book of Spooks =

Mexican stop-motion television series

- Spanish: Los Sustos Ocultos de Frankelda
- English: Frankelda's Book of Spooks
- Genre: Anthology; Horror; Fantasy
- Created by: Arturo and Roy Ambriz
- Written by: Arturo and Roy Ambriz
- Directed by: Arturo and Roy Ambriz
- Voices of: Mireya Mendoza; Arturo Mercado Jr.; Lourdes Ambriz; Anahí Allué; Sergio Carranza; Luis Leonadro Suárez; Magda Giner; Assira Abbate; Jessica Fam; Gina H Amelio; Sebastián Albavera
- Opening theme: "Tinta Invisible"
- Composer: Kevin Smithers
- Country of origin: Mexico
- Original languages: Spanish
- No. of seasons: 1
- No. of episodes: 5

Production
- Executive producers: Rodolfo Ambriz Avelar; Adriana Rendón
- Producer: Arturo and Roy Ambriz
- Running time: 12-16 minutes
- Production companies: Cinema Fantasma; Darkframe Digital; Cartoon Network Latin America Original Productions

Original release
- Network: HBO Max
- Release: 29 October 2021 (Latin America); 12 October 2023 (United States and Canada)

Frankelda's Book of Spooks (Spanish: Los Sustos Ocultos de Frankelda), commonly abbreviated simply as Frankelda, is a Mexican stop motion animated television series created by brothers Arturo and Roy Ambriz and produced by the animation studio Cinema Fantasma for Cartoon Network Latin America and HBO Max.

== Premise ==
Frankelda, a mysterious ghostwriter, tells tales of terror with the assistance of her grumpy enchanted book Herneval, primarily focused on children encountering supernatural entities such as gnomes, witches, sirens and the Coco collectively known as "Spooks", that rely on human fear to survive. Trapped in the consciousness of a sentient haunted house for 150 years, telling stories allows the two an opportunity to gradually regain their strength and make an escape plan, though with the obstacle of the house itself waking up.

== Characters ==
- Frankelda (voiced by Mireya Mendoza), is the show's narrator, loosely inspired by Frankenstein author Mary Shelley. She is the energetic ghost of Francisca Imelda, an aspiring horror writer from 1870s Mexico. Growing up with a fondness for reading and writing scary stories, her passions were discouraged by her family and her manuscripts were rejected by sexist publishers, resulting in her taking on her pen name. She takes an offer from Herneval to become his new Royal Nightmare Writer, allowing her stories to find an audience in people's dreams, though her consciousness has to be separated from her body to make the trip to the realm of the Spooks. However, with the journey turning into a one-way trip and the nature of dreams leaving her anonymous, she has become a literal ghostwriter.
- Herneval (voiced by Arturo Mercado Jr.) is Frankelda's cautious and grumpy enchanted book, named for Herne the Hunter and Percy Shelley. Prior to taking on his current state, he was an owl-like creature that was the Prince of Topus Terrentus, the kingdom of Spooks. Admiring her work since the two were children, he makes a romantic offer for her to become the Spooks' new nightmare writer. Herneval can make people sleep by touching them and can induce astral projection in humans.
- Procustes (voiced by Luis Leonardo Suarez) is a giant spider monster that was the previous Royal Nightmare Writer of the Spooks. When his stories had become tired, cliche and less effective for creating the nightmares the kingdom needed, Herneval sought to replace him with Frankelda. In revenge he made sure Frankelda's consciousness would not leave the Spook realm, and through unknown circumstances, he has transformed into a living haunted house that has trapped Frankelda and Herneval within the walls of his mind.

== Production ==
Frankelda's Book of Spooks was initially pitched as a small web series with a four-minute pilot episode being released in 2019 on the Cartoon Network YouTube channel, inspired by Tales from the Crypt and The Storyteller. When the series was backed by HBO Max as part of their larger initiative to develop 100 projects in Latin America, the Ambriz brothers expanded the scope of the project into something more dramatic with musical numbers. 122 puppets and 42 sets were created for the series.

The series was dubbed into English twice over, first by the Miami-based studio BKS as a language option for its initial HBO Max Latin America release and a second time by Keywords Studios in Los Angeles for its US release. This second dub had the three leads of the Mexican cast reprise their roles in English.

The series is being positioned as a "calling card" for Cinema Fantasma, with the Ambriz brothers describing Frankelda's extended backstory as offering enough depth as a hook for potential later seasons or a movie. A spinoff exploring the backstory of Frankelda and Herneval further was announced at the Pixelatl 2022 festival, titled Frankelda and the Prince of Spooks, later being confirmed as a movie when it was announced it would be featured as a work in progress at the 2023 Annecy International Animation Festival as part of a showcase of Mexican animation. The film, retitled I Am Frankelda, was completed in 2025 and premiered at Annecy, with a Mexican theatrical release being planned for the fall. Cinema Fantasma would later collaborate with Cartoon Network again on Women Wearing Shoulder Pads for Adult Swim.

== Episodes ==
Series	Episodes	Originally released
Pilot		11 November 2019
1	5	29 October 2021

Pilot	Air Date	Platform	Duration
Sustos ocultos de Frankelda	11 November 2019	Cartoon Network's YouTube channel	4:17 min

No.	Title	Directed by	Written by	Original release date	English release date
1	"What's Your Name"	Arturo Ambriz and Roy Ambriz	Arturo Ambriz Rendón and Roy Ambriz	29 October 2021	12 October 2023
Frankelda tells the story of Nemo, a boy who is willing to offer a gnome the most valuable thing he has in exchange for free time.
2	"You Can Transform Yourself"	Arturo Ambriz and Roy Ambriz	Arturo Ambriz and Roy Ambriz	29 October 2021	12 October 2023
Frankelda tells the story of Magali, a girl who accepts a deal with three mysterious women, seeking to change to fit in.
3	"They'll Drown in Their Fears"	Arturo Ambriz and Roy Ambriz	Arturo Ambriz Rendón and Roy Ambriz	29 October 2021	12 October 2023
Frankelda tells the story of Uli, a boy who will have to overcome his own insecurities to rescue his friends from the clutches of a mythological aquatic being.
4	"Let's Get Out of the Dark"	Arturo Ambriz and Roy Ambriz	Arturo Ambriz and Roy Ambriz	29 October 2021	12 October 2023
Frankelda tells the story of Tere, a girl who makes a deal with the charismatic El Coco to stop suffering from her passion for theremin music.
5	"Invisible Ink"	Arturo Ambriz and Roy Ambriz	Arturo Ambriz and Roy Ambriz	29 October 2021	12 October 2023
Frankelda tells the story of her mortal self, Francisca Imelda, who decides to challenge the world with the help of a mysterious being to dedicate herself to writing horror fiction.

== Film ==
A prequel film based on the series, titled I Am Frankelda, had its world premiere as the opening film of the 40th Guadalajara International Film Festival on 6 June 2025. The film was released in Mexican theaters by Cinépolis Distribución on October 23, 2025, and was released internationally by Netflix on June 12, 2026.
