= Cine Ideal =

Cinema in Madrid, Spain

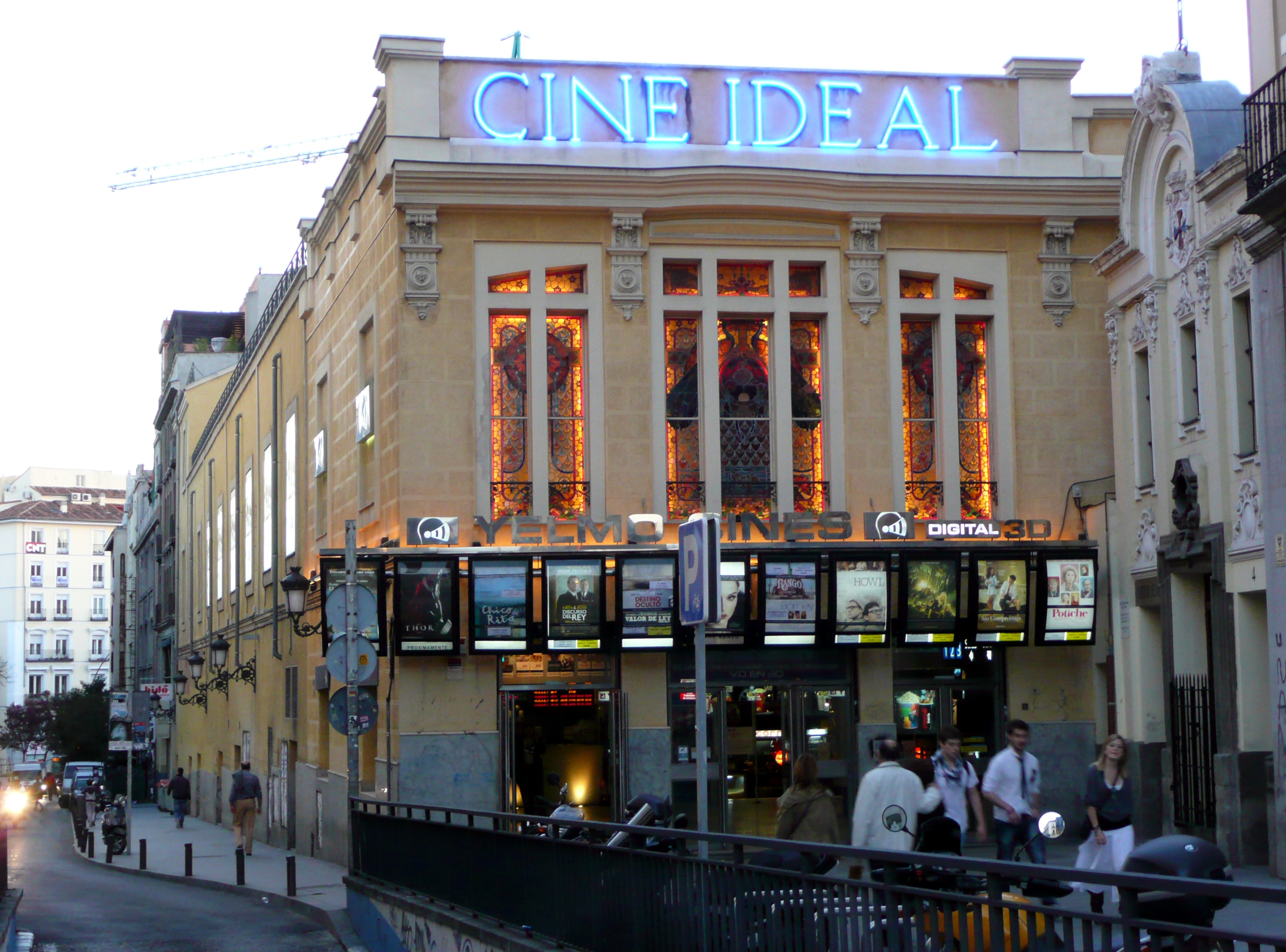
- Façade to Doctor Cortezo
- Interactive map of Cine Ideal
- Address: Calle del doctor Cortezo, 6 Madrid, Spain
- Coordinates: 40.41369°N 3.70384°W
- Type: multiplex

Tenant
- Yelmo Cines

Cine Ideal, also known under the commercial name Yelmo Cines Ideal is a cinema in Madrid, Spain. It specialises in the screening of films in their original version.

== History ==
=== Origins ===
The venue was built on the elongated plot hitherto occupied by some barracks belonging to the Ministry of Development. Designed by José Espelius, building works started in June 1915. It opened in May 1916. It boasted a reported maximum capacity, according to the journalistic chronicles of the time, of up to 3,000 spectators. In 1932, it was briefly used for stage performances. It was refurbished in 1958. Specialised in genre films in the late 20th century, it closed down towards 1985.

=== Multiplex ===
In 1990, after the purchase by Yelmo Cines, (Note: Purchased by Mexican theatre chain Cinépolis in 2015.) the interior was revamped into a multiplex with 9 screens distributed on two floors, henceforth becoming a linchpin in Madrid for the screening of films in their original version. (Note: In Spain, the bulk of theatrical screenings of films not in the Spanish language are primarily screened in dubbed versions.) From April to November 2017, the venue was closed due to refurbishing works that included accessibility improvements (a lift between the two floors).
