= I Am Frankelda =

- Theatrical release poster
- Spanish: Soy Frankelda
- English: I Am Frankelda
- Directed by: Arturo and Roy Ambriz
- Screenplay by: Arturo and Roy Ambriz
- Based on: Frankelda's Book of Spooks by Arturo and Roy Ambriz
- Produced by: Arturo and Roy Ambriz
- Starring: Mireya Mendoza; Arturo Mercado Jr. Luis Leonardo Suárez
- Cinematography: Fernanda G. Manzur; Irene Melis
- Edited by: Gabriel Acuña
- Music by: Kevin Smithers
- Production companies: Cinema Fantasma; Cartoon Network Latin America; Cine Vendaval; Woo Films
- Distributed by: Cinépolis Distribución (Mexico); Netflix (International)
- Release dates: June 6, 2025 (FICG); October 23, 2025 (Mexico)
- Running time: 113 minutes (Festival cut); 103 minutes (Theatrical)
- Countries: Mexico; United States
- Languages: Spanish; English

I Am Frankelda (Spanish: Soy Frankelda) is a 2025 stop motion animated gothic musical dark fantasy film written and directed by Arturo and Roy Ambriz. It is a prequel to the Cartoon Network Latin America television series Frankelda's Book of Spooks, becoming the first Mexican film made entirely in stop-motion technique, and features the voices of Mireya Mendoza (in a dual role), Arturo Mercado Jr. and Luis Leonardo Suárez. The plot follows Francisca Imelda, a young aspiring writer in Post-colonial Mexico and her struggles to fulfill her dreams after being approached by a prince who needs her help to save his kingdom.

I Am Frankelda had its world premiere as the opening film of the 40th Guadalajara International Film Festival on June 6, 2025, as well as competing in the Best International Animation Feature Film category. an English dub was produced by Netflix in 2026.

== Plot ==
In 1866, in Monte Video, Mexico, Francisca Imelda is an aspiring horror writer. Following her mother's death and despite disapproval from her strict grandmother, she continues to write about fantastic creatures and a realm called the Topus Terrenus. Unbeknownst to her, her fiction is real in a parallel dimension where one of her characters, Prince Herneval discovers the existence of humans by following Francisca's narrative.

Because the Topus Terrenus and its inhabitants thrive on human fear, Herneval is forbidden by his parents from ever returning to the human realm. Later, the royal advisor and "nightmare-teller" Procustes visits the castle concerned about the kingdom's decline due to a lack of fear. From that day, Herneval vows to save his home and find a solution.

Ten years later, an 18-year-old Francisca fails to publish her work and decides to try again using the pseudonym "Frankelda." In the Topus Terrenus, Herneval decides to replace Procustes with Francisca as the new nightmare-teller. He travels to the human world and convinces her to join him. Using Herneval's powers, Francisca separates her consciousness to travel to the royal castle.

However, Procustes summons the clan leaders of the Topus Terrenus and attempts to discourage Francisca, dismissing her stories as "amateur" work. As Francisca remains on the realm longer than expected, Procustes unsuccessfully tries to mimic her style. He eventually waits for Herneval to ask permission to use her stories to trick Francisca into believing she is being manipulated, causing her to distrust Herneval and doubt her own talent.

Procustes manipulates Herneval into keeping Francisca in the realm longer by creating a "manufactured" nightmare. Herneval agrees, unaware that Procustes intends to invade and plagiarize the nightmare to claim the story as his own. When Francisca discovers the theft, she is devastated and threatens to leave the Topus Terrenus forever.

Shortly after, Procustes captures Francisca and, with the support of the clan leaders, orchestrates a coup against the monarchs of the Topus Terrenus. Meanwhile, Herneval travels to the human world to find Francisca, only to realize she never returned. Deducing she has been captured, Herneval returns to rescue her and apologizes for his actions. Francisca suggests defeating Procustes by luring him into a nightmare of her own creation.

At the castle, Francisca enters the nightmare, but when Procustes invades it, he manages to overpower her. Sensing the plan has failed, Herneval attempts to wake her but is fatally wounded by a hypnotized guard. With his remaining strength, Herneval enters the nightmare to help Francisca contain Procustes, who transforms into a house within the dreamscape. Before his defeat, Procustes threatens to trap them both inside forever; Herneval's consciousness merges with Francisca's book, leaving them both stranded within the nightmare.

With the intervention of the loyal guardian of the Topus Terrenus, Ceimut, the clan leaders are exiled, and Herneval's parents honor the duo's sacrifice by sharing Francisca's stories as nightmares, this also in turn restores the kingdom back to its former glory. Within the dream, Francisca and Herneval reunite and she vows to never stop writing. Suddenly, she wakes up in the human world. Inspired by her journey, she writes a new book titled "I am Frankelda", which is finally published, fulfilling her lifelong dream.

== Voice cast ==
- Mireya Mendoza as:
  - Francisca Imelda/Frankelda
    - Habana Zoé as Young Francisca Imelda
  - Dama Coyote
- Arturo Mercado Jr. as Herneval
  - Luis Leonardo Suárez as the singing voice of Herneval
  - Juan Pablo Monterrubio as Hernevalito
  - Jules Presley as Young Prince Herneval
- Luis Leonardo Suárez as Procustes
- Carlos Segundo as Ceimut
- Beto Castillo as Rey Ficturo
- Assira Abbate as Tochina
- Arturo Ambriz as Timet
- Lourdes Ambriz as Sirena's singing voice
- Roy Ambriz as Dubium
- Antonio Badía as Otovejuno
- Sergio Carranza as Don Coco
- Jesse Conde as Editor Damastes
- Idzi Dutkiewicz as Mitelitas
- Karla Falcón as Aluxastli
- Magda Giner as Totolina/Abuela María Concepcion
  - Anahí Allué as Totolina's singing voice
- Laura Torres as Chupasangre

Additionally Mendoza, Castillo, Cárdenas, Zoe, Monterrubio and Suárez sing in the movie as their respective characters. Arturo and Roy Ambriz the film directors also voice Timet and Dubium. Lourdez Ambriz, a soprano singer and Roy and Arturo's aunt, also provides the singing voice for the siren. The movie is dedicated to her memory as she died in 2025.

=== English dub ===
- Mireya Mendoza as:
  - Francisca Imelda
    - Violet Wiatrek as Young Francisca Imelda
  - Lady Coyote
- Mark Lewis as Porcustus
- Claudis Bridgeforth as Herneval
  - Jules Presley as Young Herneval
- Debra Wilson as Totolina
- Lord KraVen as Victuro
- Elysa Gomez as Veritena
- Sean Rohani as Mythelinas
- Jason LeShea as Don Coco
- Cameron Bowen as Ceimut
- Betsy Holt as Bloodsucker
  - Mireya Mendozas as Bloodsucker (singing voice)
- Tyler John Williams as Dubium
- John Ciccolini as Timet
- Brigitte Kali as Aluxastil
- Alejandro Ruiz as Gusto
- Ell as Sirena, Maria Conchita
- Daniel Garcia as Otovejuno
- Jayne Taini as Tamazola
- Maeva Feitelson Tochina
- Jesse Corti as Editor Domastas, Don Isidro
- Gael Vidina as Young Augusto

Additional voices by Makaio Colter, Bobby Field, Dash Gomer, Faith Graham, Hudson Vander Hoort, Guy Mandia Jr., Teddy Rayburn, and Hanna-Lee Sakakibara

== Production ==
The film began production in January 2024 in Mexico City under the working title Frankelda and the Prince of Spooks. Originally planned as a half-hour special for HBO Max, the script ballooned in scope into a two-hour film. With the special's budget as a base, the film was otherwise largely self-funded using savings for the brothers' other proposed film The Ballad of the Phoenix. Guillermo del Toro served as a mentor figure on the project and helped refine the film's theatrical cut.

It is considered to be the first independently made Mexican stop-motion film.

== Release ==
I Am Frankelda had its world premiere on June 6, 2025, as the opening film of the 40th Guadalajara International Film Festival, then screened on June 11, 2025, at the 2025 Annecy International Animation Film Festival, and on July 20, 2025, at the 29th Fantasia International Film Festival.

The film received commercial release on October 23, 2025, in Mexican theaters by Cinépolis Distribución. It was also released in Panama and Guatemala. In February 2026, Netflix acquired worldwide rights to the film, planning to release it sometime later that year. In April the same year, Netflix announced that the film will premiere on June 12.

== Reception ==
On the review aggregator website Rotten Tomatoes, 95% of 44 critics' reviews are positive. The website's consensus reads: "Marrying its pleasingly shopworn style with vivid flights of fancy, I Am Frankelda is a unique adventure that announces an exciting new voice in animation." On Metacritic, the film has a weighted average score of 74 out of 100 based on 11 critics, which the site labels as "generally favorable" reviews.

== Accolades ==
| Award / Festival | Date of ceremony | Category | Recipient(s) | Result | Ref. |
|---|---|---|---|---|---|
| Guadalajara International Film Festival | 14 June 2025 | Best International Animation Feature Film | I Am Frankelda | Nominated | |
| Fantasia International Film Festival | 3 August 2025 | Silver Audience Award for Best Animated Feature | I Am Frankelda | Won | |
| Fantasia International Film Festival | 3 August 2025 | Special Jury Mention - Best Animated Feature | I Am Frankelda | Won | |
| Tokyo International Film Festival | 29 October 2025 | | I Am Frankelda | Nominated | |
| Annie Awards | 21 February 2026 | Best Independent Feature | I Am Frankelda | Nominated | |
| Luminus Awards | 26 August 2026 | Best Film | I Am Frankelda | Nominated | |
| Luminus Awards | 26 August 2026 | Best Animated Feature Film | I Am Frankelda | Won | |
| Luminus Awards | 26 August 2026 | Best Director | Roy Ambriz & Arturo Ambriz | Nominated | |
| Luminus Awards | 26 August 2026 | Best Advertising Campaign | Cinépolis Distribución | Won | |
| Ariel Awards | 3 October 2026 | Best Animated Feature Film | I Am Frankelda | Won | |
| Ariel Awards | 3 October 2026 | Best Visual Effects | María José Straffon | Nominated | |
