= The Best Mother in the World =

2025 Brazilian film

- Brazilian theatrical release poster
- Portuguese: A melhor mãe do mundo
- Directed by: Anna Muylaert
- Written by: Anna Muylaert; Grace Passô; Mariana Jaspe
- Produced by: Ricardo Costianovsky; Tomás Darcyl; Clara Ramos; Bianca Villar; Fernando Fraiha; Karen Castanho; Gabriel Gurman; Anna Muylaert
- Starring: Shirley Cruz; Seu Jorge; Rihanna Barbosa; Benin Ayo
- Cinematography: Lílis Soares
- Edited by: Fernando Stutz
- Music by: André Abujamra; George Nahssen
- Production companies: Biônica Filmes; Telefilms group
- Distributed by: Galeria Distribuidora
- Release dates: 15 February 2025 (Berlinale); 7 August 2025 (Brazil)
- Running time: 90 minutes
- Countries: Brazil; Argentina
- Language: Portuguese

The Best Mother in the World (Portuguese: A melhor mãe do mundo) is a 2025 drama film directed by Anna Muylaert, co-written by Muylaert, Grace Passô and Mariana Jaspe. The film follows Gal (Shirley Cruz), a hard-working waste collector mother who fights for the safety of her young children.

The film had its world premiere in the Berlinale Special section of the 75th Berlin International Film Festival on 15 February 2025. It was theatrically released in Brazil on 7 August 2025 by Galeria Distribuidora.

== Synopsis ==
Gal is married to Leandro and has two children. She earns her living as a recyclable material collector. After suffering abuse from her husband Leandro, Gal seeks help by filing a complaint at a women's police station, but she doesn't receive the support she needs. Resolute in her desire to provide a better and safer life for her two children, she decides to leave her home, taking her children along in her cart. Gal tries to sell the difficult situation to her children as a great adventure.

== Cast ==
- Shirley Cruz as Gal
- Seu Jorge as Leandro
- Rihanna Barbosa
- Benin Ayo

== Production ==
The Best Mother in the World is written and directed by Anna Muylaert, in collaboration with Grace Passô and Mariana Jaspe. The production is by Ricardo Costianovsky, Tomás Darcyl, from the Telefilms group, Clara Ramos, from Galeria Distribuidora, Bianca Villar, Fernando Fraiha and Karen Castanho, from Biônica, and Gabriel Gurman. The cinematography is by Lílis Soares. Principal photography began on November 22, 2023 on locations in São Paulo in Brazil,

== Release ==
The Best Mother in the World had its world premiere in the Berlinale Special section of the 75th Berlin International Film Festival on 15 February 2025.

The film was released in Brazilian theaters on 7 August 2025.

The film competed in the Biarritz Film Festival on 21 September 2025, where it won Jury Coup de Coeur award.

== Accolades ==
Award	Date of ceremony	Category	Recipient(s)	Result	Ref.
Guadalajara International Film Festival	14 June 2025	Best Screenplay	Anna Muylaert	Won	
Guadalajara International Film Festival	14 June 2025	Best Performance	Shirley Cruz	Won	
Guadalajara International Film Festival	14 June 2025	Best Cinematography	Lílis Soares	Won	
Biarritz Film Festival	26 September 2025	Jury Coup de Coeur	The Best Mother in the World	Won	
