= A Yard of Jackals =

- Theatrical release poster
- Directed by: Diego Figueroa
- Written by: Diego Figueroa
- Produced by: Alejandro Ugarte
- Starring: Néstor Cantillana; Blanca Lewin
- Cinematography: Martín Hurtado Marín
- Edited by: Diego Figueroa
- Music by: Diego de la Fuente
- Production company: Infractor Films
- Distributed by: Storyboard Media Distribución (Chile); MPM Premium (International)
- Release dates: November 15, 2024 (PÖFF); January 23, 2025 (Chile)
- Running time: 108 minutes
- Country: Chile
- Language: Spanish

A Yard of Jackals (Spanish: Patio de chacales) is a 2024 Chilean psychological thriller film written, edited and directed by Diego Figueroa in his directorial debut. It is an expansion of his own short film Los vecinos. Starring Néstor Cantillana and Blanca Lewin.

== Synopsis ==
During the oppressive Chilean dictatorship, Raúl, a modest model maker, takes refuge in the apparent peace of his neighborhood. However, his life is turned upside down when mysterious neighbors arrive, unleashing a spiral of horror and violence that will leave deep scars.

The film tells the story of Raúl (Nestor Cantillana), a man who makes a living crafting models for the Chilean Army. He leads a quiet, routine life, working, caring for his mother (Grimanesa Jiménez), who is in her final days, and visiting his love interest (Blanca Lewin), who sells him lunch every day.

But this routine is suddenly disrupted when mysterious neighbors move in next door. These neighbors turn out to be agents of the National Intelligence Directorate (the film is set in 1975, during the country's military dictatorship, when this institution was responsible for persecuting, torturing, and disappearing political opponents of the regime). One of them, played by Juan Cano, stands out from the others because he has a large scar on his face and constantly interacts with Raúl through glances and gestures.

From the moment these neighbors arrive, the protagonist begins to live through a nightmare. First, he hears strange noises, then he directly hears the torture being carried out through the wall. Added to this are his relentless efforts to report what happened, the threats he received, his helplessness in trying to save a stranger who was implicated during an interrogation, and most tragically, hearing one of his friends tortured and raped in the most brutal ways imaginable (one of the film's most powerful scenes, accompanied by Cantillana's tremendous performance, which conveys his desperation). Through his models, the protagonist paints a vivid picture for the viewer of all the horrors he heard coming from the house next door.

== Cast ==
- Néstor Cantillana as Raúl
- Blanca Lewin as Laura
- María Jesús Marcone
- Rodrigo Pérez
- Juan Cano
- Consuelo Holzapfel
- Grimanesa Jiménez
- Pablo Schwarz

== Release ==
A Yard of Jackals had its world premiere on November 15, 2024, at the 28th Tallinn Black Nights Film Festival, then screened on November 28, 2024, at the 36th Viña del Mar International Film Festival, on January 15, 2025, at the 6th Ñuble National Film Festival, on February 19, 2025, at the 27th Punta del Este International Film Festival.

The film was commercially released on January 23, 2025, in Chilean theaters. International rights were acquired by MPM Premium.

== Accolades ==
| Year | Award / Festival | Category | Recipient | Result | Ref. |
|---|---|---|---|---|---|
| 2024 | 28th Tallinn Black Nights Film Festival | Best First Feature Film | A Yard of Jackals | Nominated | |
| 2024 | 28th Tallinn Black Nights Film Festival | Best First Feature Director | Diego Figueroa | Won | |
| 2024 | 36th Viña del Mar International Film Festival | Best Film – Latin American Fiction Competition | A Yard of Jackals | Won | |
| 2025 | 6th Ñuble National Film Festival | Audience Award | A Yard of Jackals | Won | |
| 2025 | 27th Punta del Este International Film Festival | Best Film | A Yard of Jackals | Nominated | |
| 2025 | 40th Guadalajara International Film Festival | FEISAL Award | A Yard of Jackals | Won | |
