= Cine Yelmo =

Spanish cinema company

Yelmo Films, S.L.U.
- Trade name: Cine Yelmo
- Company type: Subsidiary
- Industry: Cinema
- Founded: 1981; 45 years ago in Collado Villalba, Spain
- Founders: Ricardo Évole
- Headquarters: Alcorcón, Spain
- Area served: Spain
- Owner: Organización Ramírez
- Parent: Cinépolis
- Website: yelmocines.es

Yelmo Films, S.L.U., trading as Cine Yelmo, is a Spanish company founded in 1981 and dedicated to cinema exhibition. It currently has 54 complexes throughout Spain. Since 2015, the company has been part of Cinépolis, a group that operates in several countries such as Spain, Mexico, the United States, Chile, Argentina and Guatemala.

== History ==
In 1981 Ricardo Évole founded Yelmo Cines, a cinema exhibition company in Spain. The company takes its name from El Yelmo, a cliff in the Guadarrama mountain range. In 1982, they opened their first cinema, the Zoco de Collado Villalba in Madrid, with the screening of Raiders of the Lost Ark. In the following years, Yelmo Cines continued to expand, establishing new complexes and promoting the concept of multiplexes in the country.

In 1990 they rescued the old Cine Ideal in Madrid, which had been closed for eight years, and converted it into a modern multiplex cinema complex. Over the years, they continued to open new cinemas in different cities in Spain, both in Madrid and in Barcelona, Malaga, A Coruña and other locations.

In 1998 Yelmo Cines signed an agreement with Loews Cineplex, a multinational in the sector, and became Yelmo Cineplex. This partnership allowed them to grow significantly and expand their presence in smaller cities.

In the following years Yelmo Cineplex continued to innovate, introducing IMAX theatres in its complexes and offering alternative content such as live concerts and operas. In 2006, the company returned to full Spanish ownership when it acquired the shares of Loews Cineplex. Following its commitment to technology, all its cinemas were digitised in 2011, and in 2014 they opened the first Ultra HD cinema in Malaga.

In 2015 Cinépolis acquired Yelmo Cineplex, expanding its presence in Europe. Yelmo Cines continued to innovate with the introduction of new experiences for moviegoers, such as junior cinemas for children and luxury cinemas where you can enjoy a gastronomic experience while watching the film.
