= Bitter Gold =

- Theatrical release poster
- Directed by: Juan Francisco Olea
- Written by: Agustín Toscano; Francisco Hervé; Malu Furche; Moisés Sepúlveda; Nicolás Wellmann
- Produced by: Arturo Pereyra; Cristóbal Zapata; Daniela Raviola; Felipe Egaña; Francisco Hervé; Juan Bernardo González; Moisés Sepúlveda; Tom Schreiber; Virginia Bogliolo
- Starring: Francisco Melo; Kat Sánchez
- Cinematography: Sergio Armstrong
- Edited by: María José Salazar; Sebastián Brahm; Valeria Hernández
- Music by: Sofía Scheps
- Production company: Juntos Films
- Distributed by: Cinecolor Films (Chile)
- Release dates: October 13, 2024 (WFF); May 8, 2025 (Chile)
- Running time: 83 minutes
- Countries: Chile; Germany; Mexico; Uruguay
- Language: Spanish

Bitter Gold (Spanish: Oro amargo) is a 2024 neo-Western thriller drama film directed by Juan Francisco Olea. The film stars Francisco Melo and Katalina Sánchez as a gold miner and his teenage daughter who defend an illegal gold mine from other miners who want to steal from them. It is a co-production between Chile, Germany, Mexico and Uruguay.

== Synopsis ==
Carola lives in the Atacama Desert with her father, Pacífico, operating a copper mine, although they hide a secret: a vein of gold. After a violent confrontation with an intruding miner, Pacífico is injured. Carola takes his place in the mine, defying her own youth and the hostility of the other miners to achieve her dream of a home by the sea.

== Cast ==
- Katalina Sánchez as Carola
- Francisco Melo as Pacífico
- Michael Silva as Humberto
- Daniel Antivilo as Juan María
- Moisés Angulo as Vladimiro
- Carlos Donoso as Amadeo
- Carla Moscatelli as Doctor
- Matias Catalán as Gaspar
- Carlos Rodríguez as Félix
- Anibal Vásquez as Aníbal
- Carlos Troncoso as Nelson

== Release ==
Bitter Gold had its world premiere on October 13, 2024, at the 40th Warsaw Film Festival, then screened on November 24, 2024, at the 55th International Film Festival of India, on January 14, 2025, at the 6th Ñuble National Film Festival, on January 28, 2025, at the 48th Gothenburg Film Festival, on March 23, 2025, at the 34th African, Asian and Latin American Film Festival, and on April 26, 2025, at the Lichter Filmfest Frankfurt International.

The film was commercially released on May 8, 2025, in Chilean theaters by Cinecolor Films.

== Accolades ==
Year	Award / Festival	Category	Recipient	Result	Ref.
2024	40th Warsaw Film Festival	Warsaw Grand Prix	Bitter Gold	Nominated	
2024	40th Warsaw Film Festival	Ecumenical Jury Award	Bitter Gold	Won	
2025	40th Guadalajara International Film Festival	Best Ibero-American Fiction Feature Film	Bitter Gold	Nominated	
