= Carlos Roque =

Portuguese comics artist (1936–2006)

Carlos Roque (12 April 1936 – 27 July 2006) was a Portuguese comics artist.

== Life and career ==
Roque was born in Lisbon. He began publishing in 1959, in the Portuguese comic Camarada. Roque relocated to Belgium in 1964, where he found extensive work in the Belgian comics market.

In 1965 Rogue began working for the Franco-Belgian comics magazine Spirou, where he produced several series, including the series “Angélique” in 1968. The “Angélique” stories were primarily written by his wife Monique, with a few by Raoul Cauvin and Charles Jadoul. In 1969 Roque and his wife created the adventures of the duckling “Wladimyr”, for which they won the Saint-Michel Award in 1976. Roque also worked for Spirou's Dutch edition, Robbedoes.

Roque died in Leuven, Belgium on 27 July 2006.
