= Arturo and Roy Ambriz =

Mexican writers, directors, and producers

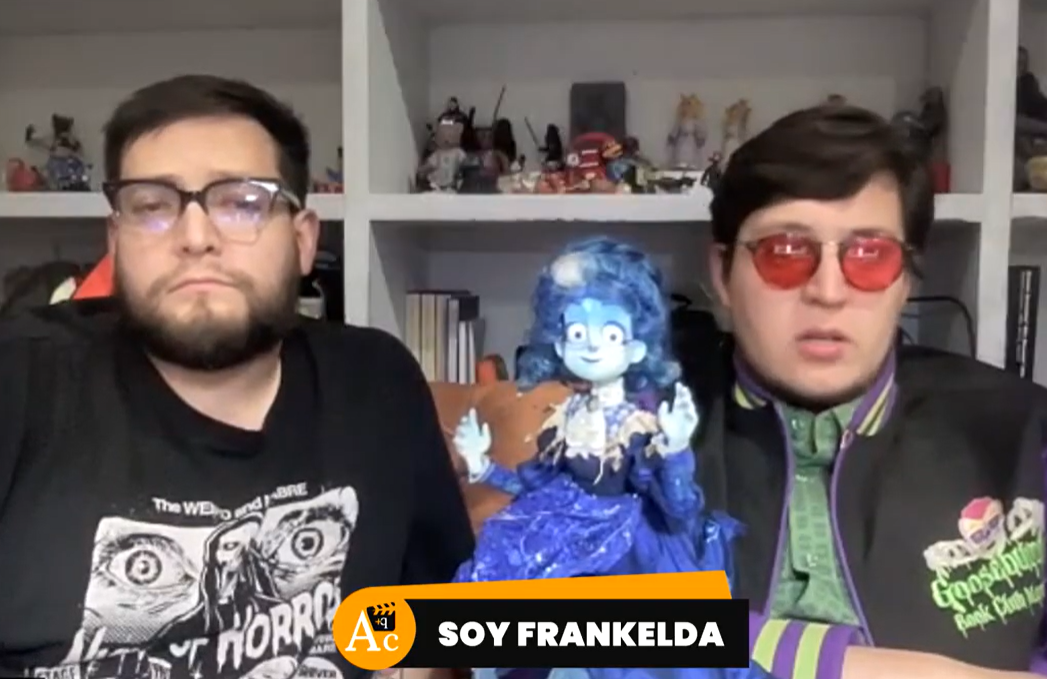
- Arturo (left) and Roy in 2025
- Born: Mexico City, Mexico
- Occupations: Film directors, writers, producers
- Notable work: Frankelda's Book of Spooks; I Am Frankelda; Women Wearing Shoulder Pads

Arturo and Roy Ambriz (born 1990 and 1988) are Mexican directors, writers, and producers best known for their stop-motion works. They are brothers. They directed, wrote, and produced I Am Frankelda, Mexico's first feature-length stop motion film, and also directed, wrote, and produced Frankelda's Book of Spooks. They are the producers of Adult Swim's Women Wearing Shoulder Pads, the founders of Mexican stop-motion studio Cinema Fantasma, and were mentored by Guillermo del Toro.

== Biography ==
Roy was born in 1988 and Arturo, his younger brother, was born in 1990. Both studied film in university. They first ideated their independent stop-motion studio Cinema Fantasma when preparing for Arturo's thesis film Pluto and the Planets, and officially launched it not long after. They are considered proteges of del Toro.

They were mentored by del Toro and Screen Novelties, among others, while working to produce their first official film, stop-motion Cubist short Revoltoso. The short, which took the duo five years, is about a boar who finds a film camera. The short was also blurbed by Jorge R. Gutierrez. During this time, they also produced 7 short stop-motion films for Cartoon Network Latin America, based on existing Cartoon Network shows and called "C Sides".

They then went on to direct, write, and produce Frankelda's Book of Spooks. The pilot was released by Cartoon Network in 2019. After HBO Max decided to produce it, the series became a musical, and it premiered in 2021. It then made its English-language debut in 2023. It received positive reviews from critics.

They then planned to create a half-an-hour special prequel episode of Frankelda's Book of Spooks for HBO Max Latin America called Frankelda and the Prince of Spooks. The film, however, soon grew in length to a full-length movie, which became known as I Am Frankelda and became the first feature-length stop-motion film from Mexico, premiering at the Annecy International Animation Film Festival in 2025. That same year, it was released in Mexico. It was purchased by Netflix for release in 2026. It has received positive reviews from critics, including at Empire and IndieWire.

They also produced stop-motion series Women Wearing Shoulder Pads for Adult Swim.

They have announced two other feature films, The Ballad of the Phoenix, which was originally meant to be created before I Am Frankelda, and The Bee Revolution. As of June 2026, they are in pre-production for The Ballad of the Phoenix.
