= The Positives =

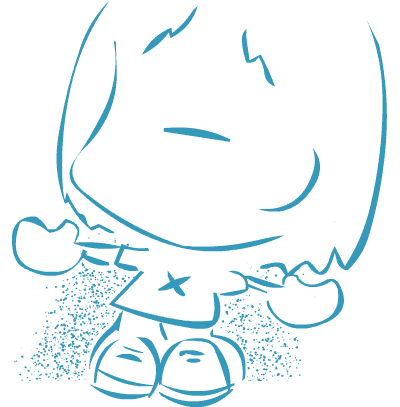
- Xavier, protagonist of The Positives

Publication information
- Format: minicomic / webcomic
- Genre: humor, social commentary
- Publication date: 1997 – present
- Main character(s): Xavier; The Director; Animal

Creative team
- Created by: Valter de Matos

The Positives (Portuguese: Os Positivos), also known as P+, is a self-published Portuguese punk comic fanzine and webcomic series created by Valter de Matos, unfolding the daily life of Xavier and friends, but whose actions mostly serve as a proxy to the author's grim view on society, as the comics are known for their depressive and negative attitudes, militancy on animal rights issues and direct action, and their anarchist stance against modern civilization. From 2016 onwards The Positives started favoring editorial cartoons over comics while regularly publishing long texts in the intersection of media, popular culture, comics, and politics.

== Overview and format ==
Drawn as flat black-and-white cartoons, the style is raw, fast, crude, and the characters all bear the distinctive feature of lacking their eyes. The content is mostly cynical, offensive, or awkwardly personal, resulting in a combination the series slogan resumes as “Humor & Depression”, a mix explained at length by creator de Matos in a rare unheralded disclosure.

The storyline of The Positives is not obvious to the casual reader, containing several dispersed narratives that seem to converge into a single timeline as short stories and one-offs are connected over time. The freely mixed editorial cartoons with ongoing plots further bewilder new readers, and the stories repeatedly break the fourth wall, likewise dividing it between a “reality” and a “behind the camera” world that will on occasions interlude the first, revealing it to be a fictional series written and filmed inside a fake set by The Director. Finally, further complicating the P+ universe, The Director and his former self as a young teenager - named Animal, both exist at the same time, hating what they once were/turn out to be and continuously trying to sabotage their other self.

== Publication history ==
The Positives first became available as printed fanzines in 1997 and later became a webcomic. Presently they exist in both formats, digital and paper, and digital readers are encouraged to crossover by downloading, printing and folding special one-page microzines (entitled “Comix Guerrilla Warfare”) deliberately created to be scattered in public places for provocation.

The series is divided into three main periods: “XXX-Irritante” (1997–1998), “[D]ejected” (2009–2013) and "...previously" (2014–?), all published as fanzines but only the latter available as webcomics. Between these series The Positives short stories were published along other comics on the “fanzzine” series (2003) and later collected in “Random” fanzine (2009). During the second series, The Positives also featured three long tomes with “THE ROADTRIP” (2010-2012). In 2020 the trilogy MARCOS/PARCOS/FARTOS collects further material originally published online.

In “XXX-Irritant”, The Positives revolve around Xavier’s love for Susana and his suicide in the final fanzine. The flashback narrative of the last published fanzine suggests the death of the main character, but the final issue was never made available and since then Xavier has reappeared in the series.

The “[D]ejected” series concerns the unwanted pregnancy of Xavier’s former lover Sofia by his gay friend Miguel, who hates all women in general and Sofia specifically.

In “The Roadtrip” Xavier and friends travel across country to unwarily help Miguel get revenge on a chicken farmer. During the trip they are followed by a gang of Nazis, Xavier sets the farm on fire and Miguel rapes an undercover policeman kidnapped by some of Xavier’s radical-left friends who mistook him for a “capitalist pig”.

"...Previously" collects short talks between Xavier and his two roommates while on an endless car journey. These stories are shown in random order, each ending with a "to be continued / preceded..." notice.

Fanzines series	Publishing date
XXX-Irritante	1997 - 1999
fanzine	April 2003 - December 2003
Random	2009
[D]ejected (first series: #1to #4)	2009
THE ROADTRIP	2011
THE ROADTRIP #2	2012
THE ROADTRIP #3	2013
[D]ejected (second series:#5 to #13)	2013
[D]ejected Omnibus	Summer 2013
Rewilding I, II and III	January 2014
Comix Guerrilla Warfare	? – present day
...Previously (#1 to #14)	2014 – 2018
MARCOS 2020	February 2020
PARCOS	March 2020
FARTOS	September 2020
Lets Be Frank	July 2021

== Awards and controversy ==
The Positives were nominated for the Portuguese Professional Comics Awards (Prémios Profissionais de Banda Desenhada) in 2013 in the webcomic category. Being a long-time detractor of the Portuguese comics scene, the creator of the series publicly denounced the nomination and in the aftermath dropped his own newsletter list (which he considered tainted), retreating the online comics in the official site to a less accessible and more scrambled navigation to avoid further exposing them to chance visitors.

In 2015 The Positives was nominated for the XIII Trophies Central Comics (XIII Troféus Central Comics), about which its creator commented, "It's a popularity contest, and that, my friends, we’re not."
