= Eduardo Teixeira Coelho =

Portuguese comic book artist (1919–2005)

Eduardo Teixeira Coelho (4 January 1919 in Angra do Heroísmo – 31 May 2005) was a Portuguese comic book artist best known for his adventure series Ragnar le Viking. In some of his early work, he used the pseudonym Martin Sievre.

Born in Terceira island, in the Azores, Coelho's career began when he moved to Mainland Portugal. His most notable work there was for the magazine Mosquito, beginning in 1943. He moved to Brazil in the 1950s and taught at the Pan-American School of Art in São Paulo. In 1955, he moved to France and for the next several decades worked on a number of series, many of them for the magazine Vaillant, including Ragnar.

He died on 31 May 2005.
