= Kali the Little Vampire =

- Film poster
- Portuguese: Kali, o pequeno vampiro
- Directed by: Regina Pessoa
- Written by: Regina Pessoa
- Produced by: Abi Feijó; Julie Roy; René Chénier; Pascal Le Nôtre; Georges Schwizgebel; Claude Luyet
- Narrated by: Christopher Plummer; Fernando Lopes
- Music by: The Young Gods
- Production companies: Ciclope Filmes; National Film Board of Canada; Folimage; Studio GDS
- Release date: April 2012 (IndieLisboa)
- Running time: 9 minutes
- Countries: Portugal; France; Canada; Switzerland

Kali the Little Vampire (Portuguese: Kali, o pequeno vampiro) is a 2012 Portuguese-French-Canadian-Swiss animated short film directed by Regina Pessoa.

The film was the last in a trilogy of animated shorts by Pessoa about childhood, following A Noite (1999) and Tragic Story with Happy Ending (2005). Kali the Little Vampire features original music from The Young Gods, and was co-produced by Abi Feijó (Ciclope Filmes), Julie Roy and René Chénier (National Film Board of Canada), Pascal Le Nôtre (Folimage), and Georges Schwizgebel and Claude Luyet (Studio GDS).

== Plot ==
Kali is a young vampire who suffers from not being able to live in the light. Living in the shadows and inspiring fear, he lives envious of other children who don’t even dream that he exists. One day, while once again watching young boys play beside the train tracks, he breaks from his isolation and discovers that because of who—and what—he is, he can make a difference in others’ lives.

== Reception ==
Kali the Little Vampire has won more than twenty awards at international film festivals and received the Portuguese Academy of Cinema's top "Sophia" award. In June 2014, it was shown in Paris as part of Panorama of Golden Nights, a program organized by UNESCO featuring 48 short films from 25 countries judged to have international cultural heritage value.

=== List of awards ===
Award/Festival	Date	Category	Recipients and nominees	Result
Annie Awards	February 2, 2013	Best Animated Short Subject	Kali the Little Vampire	Nominated
Sophia Awards	October 6, 2013	Best Animated Short Film	Kali the Little Vampire	Won
Hiroshima International Animation Festival	August 27, 2012	Hiroshima Prize	Kali the Little Vampire	Won

== See also ==
- Vampire film
