= Regina Pessoa =

Portuguese artist (born 1969)

Regina Maria Póvoa Pessoa Martins (born 16 December 1969) is a Portuguese filmmaker and animator.

== Biography ==
Regina Pessoa was born in Coimbra, but lived in a village near the city until she was seventeen. Without a TV, she spent her time reading, listening to the older ones telling stories and also painting her grandmother's house doors and walls using charcoal, encouraged by her uncle.

She graduated in painting from University of Porto in 1998 and during her time as a student took part in different animation workshops, having participated in Espace Projets (Annecy, 1995) with the short A Noite, which she would finish in 1999.

In 1992 she started working in Filmógrafo - Estúdio de Cinema de Animação do Porto, where she collaborated as animator in various films.

Her short Tragic Story with Happy Ending is the most awarded Portuguese film ever.

Her 2012 short animated film Kali the Little Vampire was awarded the Hiroshima prize at the 2012 Hiroshima international animation festival, the "1st Prize Animated Short Film – CHICAGO INTERNATIONAL CHILDREN’S FILM FESTIVAL 2013", "The Golden Gate Award for Best Animation Short - 56th SAN FRANCISCO INT. FILM FESTIVAL 2013", "40TH Annie Awards Nomination in the Best Animated Short Subject Category 2013", Nomination for the Cartoon d’Or 2013.

== Filmography ==
- Ciclo Vicioso - campaign against smoking co-directed with Abi Feijó and Pedro Serrazina for GlaxoWellcome (1996)
- Estrelas de Natal - co-directed with Abi Feijó for RTP (1998)
- A Noite (1999)
- Odisseia nas Imagens - festival intro (2001)
- Tragic Story with Happy Ending (2005)
- Kali the Little Vampire - co-produced with Folimage, National Film Board of Canada and Studio GDS (2012)
- Uncle Thomas: Accounting for the Days - co-produced with National Film Board of Canada and Les Armateurs (2019)
- Altötting - co-produced with Andreas Hykade and National Film Board of Canada (2020)
