= Tragic Story with Happy Ending =

- Directed by: Regina Pessoa
- Music by: Normand Roger
- Release date: 2005
- Running time: 7 minutes
- Countries: Portugal; Canada; France

Tragic Story with Happy Ending (French: Histoire tragique avec fin heureuse) is a 2005 Portuguese-Canadian-French animated short by Regina Pessoa.

== Production ==
To make the 7 minute film, Pessoa's drawings were transferred to glossy paper, brushed with India ink, scratched with a blade to give the effect of an engraving, then photographed. National Film Board of Canada film composer Normand Roger supplied the score for the film.

The film was the second in a trilogy of animated shorts by Pessoa about childhood, between A Noite (1999) and Kali the Little Vampire.

== Reception ==
Tragic Story with Happy Ending has received numerous awards, becoming one of Portugal's most acclaimed animated films. They include the Cristal and TPS Cineculte awards for short film at the Annecy International Animated Film Festival, a special international jury prize at the Hiroshima International Animation Festival, and a Genie Award nomination for Best Animated Short Film at the 28th Genie Awards.
