= Cinépolis =

Mexican chain of movie theaters

Exhibidora Mexicana Cinépolis, S.A. de C.V.
- Type: Private
- Industry: Film industry
- Founded: 1971; 55 years ago (as Cine Morelos)
- Founder: Enrique Ramírez Miguel
- Headquarters: Morelia, Michoacán, Mexico
- Number of locations: 335 (Latin America, United States, India, Indonesia, Spain)
- Area served: Worldwide
- Key people: Enrique Ramírez Miguel (founder and ex-Chairman of the Board); Alejandro Ramirez Magaña (CEO); Alejandra Daguer (Sales Management); Eduardo Acuña (Head of the Americas and former CEO of Cinépolis do Brasil)
- Services: Multiplex
- Owner: Organización Ramírez
- Number of employees: 41,728 (2024)
- Subsidiaries: Cine Yelmo
- Website: cinepolis.com Cinépolis USA

Cinépolis is a Mexico-based international movie theater chain. Its name means City of Cinema and its slogan is La Capital del Cine (English: The Capital of the Cinema). As of 2009 Cinépolis was the biggest cineplex chain in Mexico, with 427 theaters in 97 cities. It is also the largest chain in Latin America and one of the largest in the world, also owning cinemas in Spain (through Cine Yelmo), India, Indonesia, Oman, Bahrain, Saudi Arabia, United Arab Emirates and the United States.

== History ==
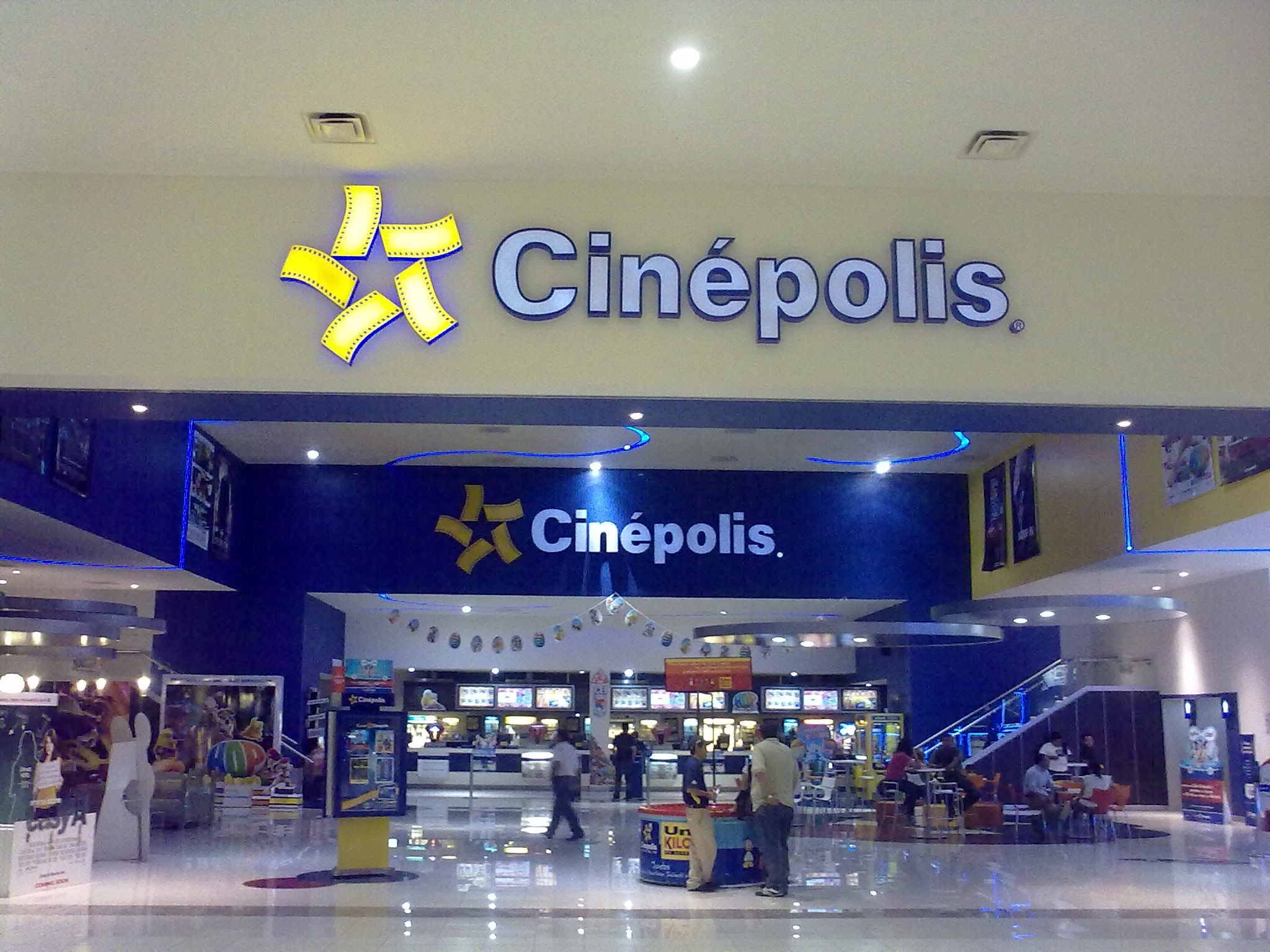
A Cinépolis theater at Plaza Sendero Ecatepec in Ecatepec de Morelos

Enrique Ramírez Miguel founded Organización Ramírez in Morelia, Michoacán, in 1971. Years before, the company opened the first cinema in the city of Salamanca the company was rebranded as Cinematográfica Cadena de Oro, S.A., opening theaters in Acámbaro and Guanajuato. By 1971, the brand had already expanded to Mexico City with the opening of Cine La Raza. In 1972 Cinemas Gemelos was born and one year later the national expansion of Multicinemas began. The company was rebranded in 1994 as Cinépolis with the first multiplex-style theaters in Tijuana. In 1999, Cinépolis VIP was created. It is believed to be the biggest cinema chain in Mexico. In 2019 the brand updated its logo mark and began rolling out the new mark to locations around the world.

== Products and services ==
=== Luxury cinemas ===
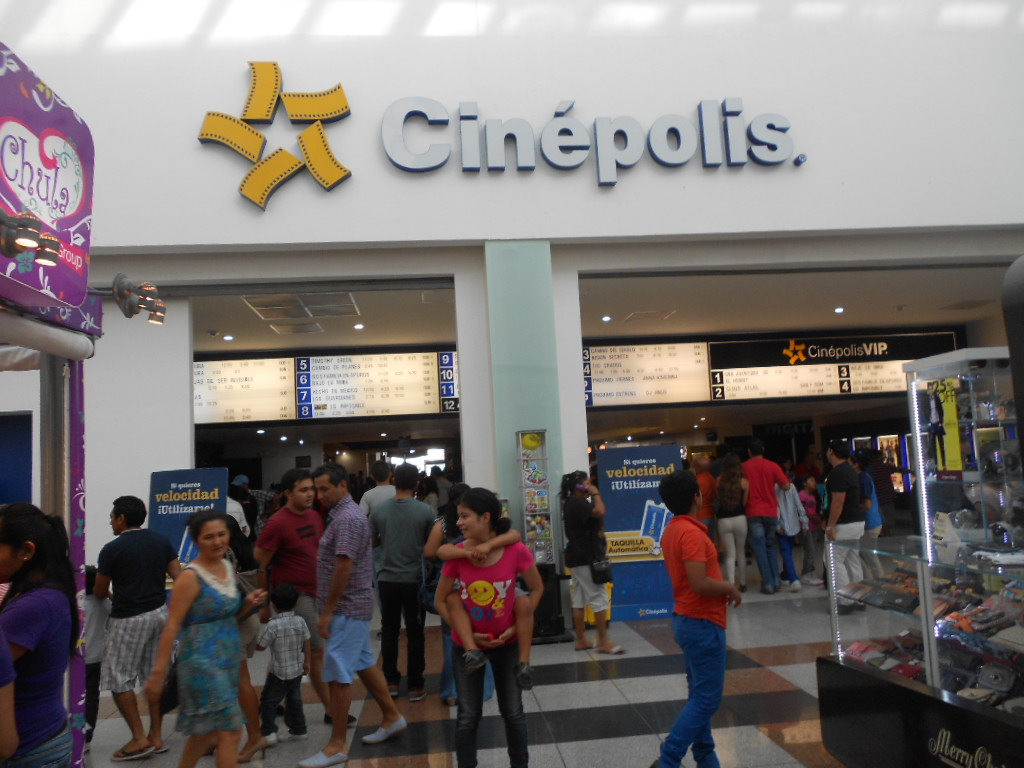
A Cinépolis VIP theater at Plaza Las Américas in Cancún

Cinépolis VIP was created in 1999 and is considered one of the pioneers in the development of the Luxury Cinema concept.

=== Online ticketing ===
In 1997, Cineticket was created to give users the option to buy their tickets online instead of waiting to purchase at the venue. Cineticket was the first online theater ticket-selling-system in Mexico.

== Premium formats ==
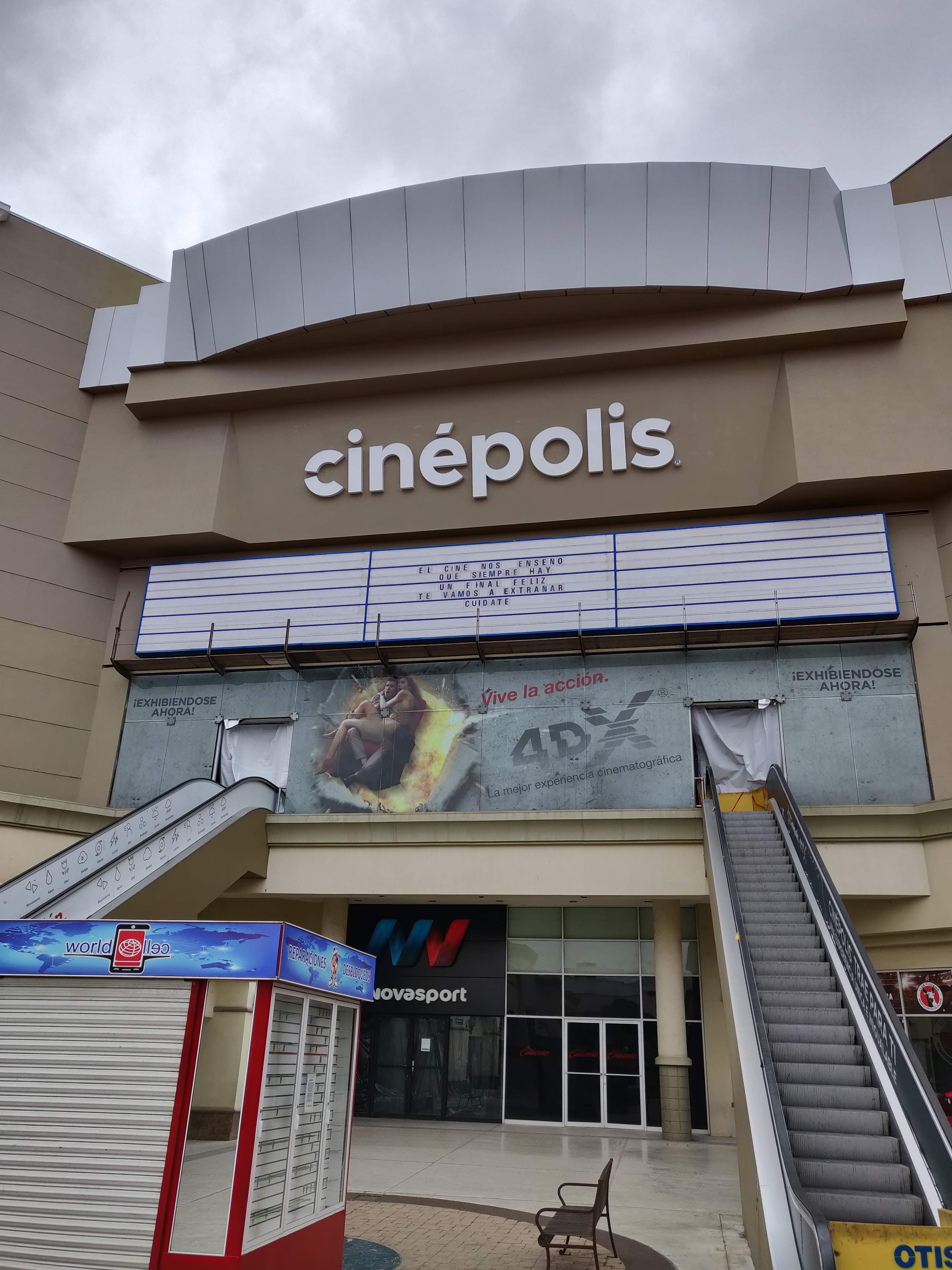
The Cinépolis anchor location, featuring 4DX, inside Plaza Río Tijuana shown closed during the COVID-19 pandemic

=== 4DX ===
On 2 June 2011, Cinépolis invested $25 million and collaborated with the South Korean company CJ Group to open 11 4DX theaters throughout Mexico. 4DX features motion seats, wind effects, water and air spray, and odors with over 100 scents. It first opened at the Plaza Acoxpa mall in Mexico City with the release of Disney's Pirates of the Caribbean: On Stranger Tides. On 1 July 2012, Cinépolis opened South America's first 4DX theater in Brazil at the JK Iguatemi shopping mall in São Paulo with the release of Prometheus and Ice Age: Continental Drift. It is the launch customer in the Western Hemisphere and is one of the largest 4DX clients. The technology has expanded throughout Mexico, and has theaters in Chile (Cinépolis Chile), Brazil, Peru, Colombia, India, Central America, and the United States.

=== ScreenX ===
It was announced on 1 April 2019 that Cinépolis expanded its collaboration with the CGV group to bring the first ScreenX theater technology in Mexico, which is a 270-degree, multi-screen theater that allows viewers to experience a film beyond the typical frame of the film's screen. It debuted at the Parque Las Antenas theater in Mexico City on 23 January 2020. It also has one ScreenX location in the United States in San Mateo, California.

=== 4DX Screen ===
A combination of the conventional ScreenX and the motion-enhanced 4DX theaters, Cinépolis also utilizes the "4DX Screen" (a.k.a. "4DX with ScreenX") theater that includes a fourth ceiling screen and the newest 4DX seat versions, first opened at the Parque Toreo theater in Mexico City on 4 March 2020. Introduced in 2017, this marks the merged technology's debut outside the Asia region and overseas.

== Markets ==
Cinépolis has opened theaters in the capitals of Guatemala, El Salvador, Costa Rica, Panama, and Colombia. Cinépolis attempted to expand their business to Ecuador, but failed. So far, 11 theatres have been opened outside Mexico under the Cinépolis brand, with a planned expansion to Peru, with the opening of a fourteen-screen theatre in Lima, a theatre in Cali, Colombia and a third in Tegucigalpa, Honduras. Cinépolis entered the Argentinian market through its acquisition of Village Cines in 2017.

=== India ===
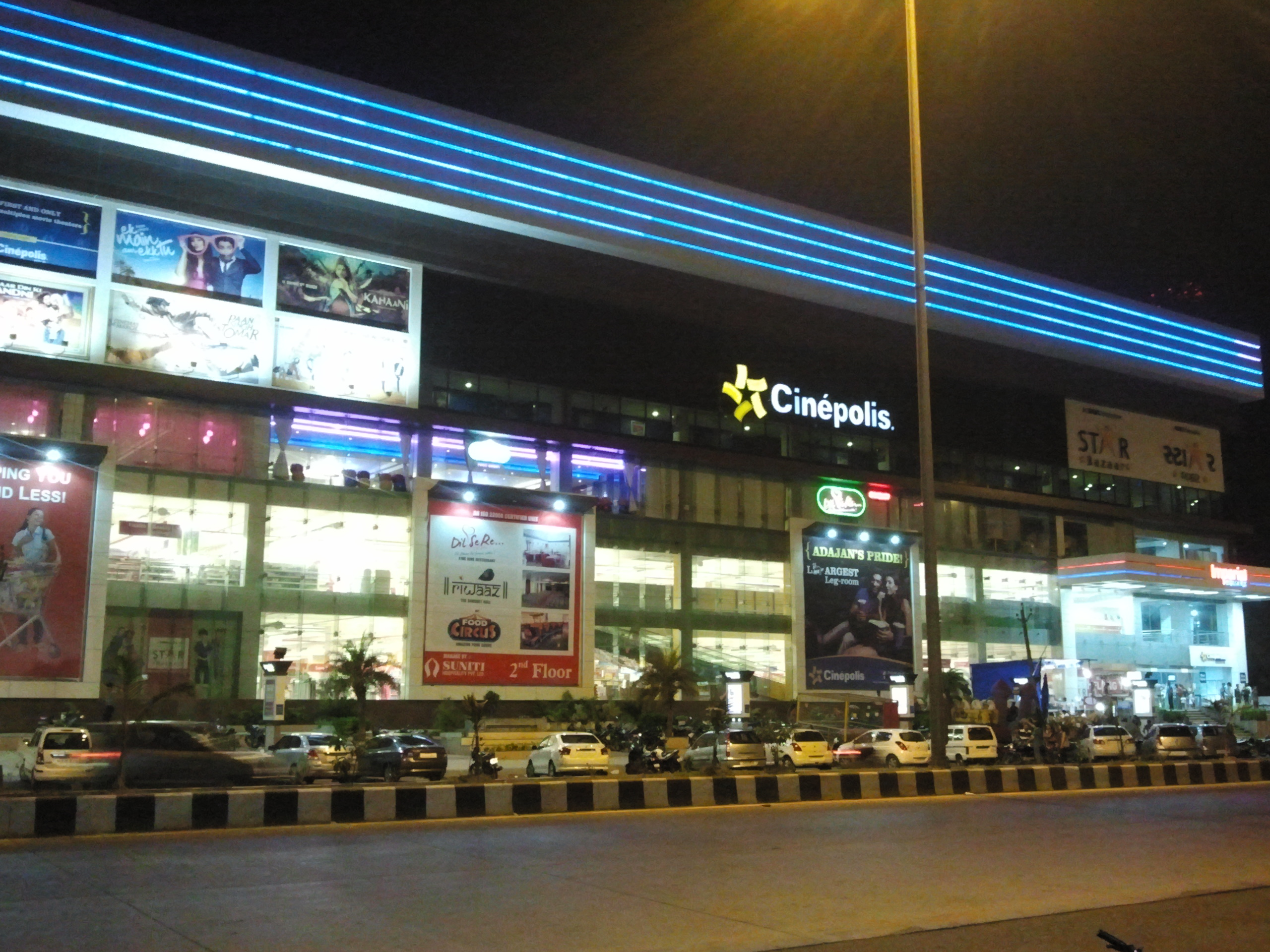
Cinépolis in Surat

Cinepolis entered India in January 2015 by acquiring Fun Cinemas, an Indian multiplex theater chain. It was based in Mumbai, and was originally established in 2001 by Essel Group. At the time of the acquisition, Fun Cinemas operated 24 multiplexes with 83 screens in India. Cinépolis planned to operate 500 screens in India with an investment of ₹ 1,500 crore and signed deals with 12 developers in eight cities to set up 110 screens in the first phase. There were also plans to enter into deals with developers to create 200 more screens across India by 2010. As of September 2024, Cinepolis India operates around 450 screens. It plans to add 80 screens in 2025.

Cinépolis opened its largest Megaplex in India in Seasons Mall, Pune with 15 screens. It also operates another Megaplex at Viviana Mall, Thane with 14 screens including IMAX, 4DX, and Dolby Atmos screens. Cinepolis Kochi operates 3 VIP screens while Cinepolis Thane operates 4 VIP screens, the first of its kind in India. Cinépolis also had a sub-brand in India known as Cinemastar. It was opened in December 2010 in Thane and was later rebranded as a Cinepolis cinema.

=== West Asia ===
In October 2017, Cinépolis CEO Alejandro Ramírez announced plans to expand into West Asia, with Ashish Shukla, former expansion chief at Cinépolis India, leading the expansion. The expansion was set to add an unspecified number of screens in Oman, Qatar, Bahrain, Kuwait, and the UAE by 2018. Cinépolis Gulf commenced operations in Bahrain in January 2019 and in Oman in May 2019

In Bahrain, Cinépolis operates a 13-screen cinema at Atrium Mall in Saar, which opened in January 2019 and includes Bahrain's first Junior theatre and 4D E-motion viewing experience, as well as two large-format screens, MacroXE with Dolby Atmos.

In Oman, a Cinépolis Luxury Cinema at Oman Avenues Mall in Muscat offers four VIP auditoriums, alongside a Junior auditorium, a MacroXE auditorium with Dolby Atmos, and 4D E-motion screens in the adjacent Cinépolis Cinema. Another cinema at Oasis Mall in Sohar opened in 2019 and features eight screens alongside a Junior theatre.

In 2020, Cinépolis expanded into the UAE with a 10-screen multiplex in Oasis Mall in Sharjah. Another cinema located at Circle Mall in Jumeirah Village, Dubai opened in 2023 but has since permanently closed.

In 2019, Cinépolis announced it will invest $300 million in six cinema complexes with 63 screens in Saudi Arabia.In 2023, Cinépolis opened its fourth cinema in Saudi Arabia, located at Al Masarah Square in Jeddah, featuring 6 luxury screening rooms as well as a Junior auditorium.

=== United States ===
Cinépolis USA, which is headquartered in Dallas, Texas, began operating luxury theaters in the United States in 2011. In November 2018, it created the Bay Theatre in Pacific Palisades, California, based on an original 1940s design by architect S. Charles Lee as a plush five-screen cinema that features a coastal-themed menu at its concession stand, including an extensive wine list. One auditorium of the new Bay Theatre is equipped with an increasingly rare 35 mm film projector. It also has a 12-screen luxury movie theater at Hollywood Park, on the site of the former Hollywood Park racetrack in Inglewood, California next to SoFi Stadium, which opened on 12 July 2023. In 2019, it acquired Moviehouse & Eatery to grow its presence in the United States.

On 9 August 2019, Cinepolis reopened its Mansfield, New Jersey location after renovations. It features 13 screens and luxury leather recliners with a full kitchen menu and bar. On January 5, 2020, Cinepolis announced it had closed its theater in Roxbury Township, New Jersey. On July 28, 2021, Cinepolis confirmed it had closed its location in Parsippany, New Jersey.

On 8 January 2023, Cinepolis closed its NYC location in Chelsea.

=== Indonesia ===
In October 2018, Cinépolis announced a collaboration with Cinemaxx, owned by Indonesia's Lippo Group, by acquiring 40% ownership stake. Cinemaxx, at that time, operated 45 theaters with 225 screens. Following the acquisition, Cinépolis opened its first cineplex on 18 September 2019 at Mataram, West Nusa Tenggara followed by the rebranding of all Cinemaxx multiplexes into Cinépolis until Q4 2019.

== Foundation ==
In 2003, Organización Ramírez created the Cinépolis Foundation to help underprivileged people get medical care and education. Its mission is to contribute to social justice in Mexico through visible health programs. In 2007 the foundation was awarded the International Accomplishment in Exhibition for its work in promoting activism within the Mexican community. The Foundation's program, Del Amor Nace la Vista (From love, sight is born) has been recognised as The Best Practice in Social Responsibility. They have signed association deals with twelve organizations in Mexico.

== Controversies ==
In March 2015, an article from the Mexican edition of Forbes magazine revealed that Cinépolis, along with rival movie theater chain Cinemex, were fined $7 million pesos (USD $379,930.25) each for directly disobeying instructions by the Instituto Nacional Electoral (INE, National Electoral Institute), by showing political propaganda of the Partido Verde Ecologista de Mexico (Ecologist Green Party of Mexico), with the political party itself being fined $35 million pesos (USD $1,899,651.25).

In 2017, the Del Amor Nace La Vista charity foundation of Cinépolis was criticized for allegedly leaving 100 Mayan indigenous people blind due to negligence. Cinepolis said it was only two, and no negligence was detected within the operations.
