= El Guapo vs. The Narco Vampires =

Mexican adult animated web series

- Genre: Adult animation; Action comedy
- Created by: Jorge R. Gutiérrez
- Written by: Jorge R. Gutiérrez; Doug Langdale; Candie Langdale
- Directed by: Jorge R. Gutierrez
- Voices of: Jorge R. Gutiérrez; Sandra Equihua
- Theme music composer: Juan Carlos Enriquez
- Composer: Juan Carlos Enriquez
- Country of origin: Mexico
- Original language: English
- No. of episodes: 1

Production
- Executive producer: Jorge R. Gutiérrez
- Producer: Tim Yoon
- Editors: Hugo Morales; Jesus Figueroa Merino
- Running time: 40 minutes
- Production companies: Mexopolis; Ánima

Original release
- Network: YouTube
- Release: December 31, 2025

El Guapo vs. The Narco Vampires is a Mexican adult animated web series created by Jorge R. Gutiérrez, and produced by Mexopolis and Ánima. The pilot episode set premiered on YouTube.

== Episodes ==
| No. | Title | Original release date |
|---|---|---|
| 1 | "Pilot" | December 31, 2025 |
