= 49th Annie Awards =

US media awards ceremony held in 2022

- Date: March 12, 2022
- Site: Royce Hall; Los Angeles, California, U.S.
- Organized by: ASIFA-Hollywood

Highlights
- Best Animated Feature: The Mitchells vs. the Machines
- Best Direction: Mike Rianda and Jeff Rowe; The Mitchells vs. the Machines
- Most awards: Arcane (9)
- Most nominations: Raya and the Last Dragon (10)

The 49th ceremony of the Annie Awards, honoring excellence in the field of animation for the year of 2021, was held on March 12, 2022, at the University of California, Los Angeles's Royce Hall in Los Angeles, California as a virtual event. The nominations were announced on December 21, 2021.

== Winners and nominees ==
The nominees were announced on December 21, 2021, Raya and the Last Dragon led the nominations with ten, followed by Encanto with nine. For TV, Arcane led with nine nominations, followed by Maya and the Three with seven.

Belle received five Annie Award nominations, including one for Best Independent Animated Feature. It was the most nominated Japanese anime film at the awards until both The Boy and The Heron and Suzume surpassed it with 7 nominations two years later.

The Mitchells vs. the Machines (Film) and Arcane (TV) have swept every awards of its nominations with eight and nine, became the first year to sweep both. The Mitchells vs. the Machines became the second film by Sony Pictures Animation to sweep the Annies after Spider-Man: Into the Spider-Verse in 2019. Arcane became the first television series to both win the most awards in a single year and season, and to sweep the Annies. Flee also won Best Animated Feature — Independent, making it the first animated documentary to do so.

Winners are highlighted in boldface

=== Productions Categories ===
Best Animated Feature	Best Animated Feature — Independent
**The Mitchells vs. the Machines – Sony Pictures Animation**; Encanto – Walt Disney Animation Studios; Luca – Pixar Animation Studios; Raya and the Last Dragon – Walt Disney Animation Studios; Sing 2 – Illumination	**Flee – Final Cut for Real, Sun Creature, Vivement Lundi !, MostFilm, Mer Film, VICE, Left HandFilms, Participant**; Belle – Studio Chizu; Distributed by GKIDS; Fortune Favors Lady Nikuko – Studio 4°C; Distributed by GKIDS; Pompo the Cinephile – CLAP Animation Studio; Distributed by GKIDS; The Summit of the Gods – Julianne Films, Folivari and Mélusine Productions Present In co-production with France 3 Cinéma and Auvergne-Rhône-Alpes Cinéma in association with Wild Bunch in association with Palatine Etoile 17, Cinémage 14, Indéfilms 8
Best Animated Special Production	Best Animated Short Subject
**Namoo – Baobab Studios**; For Auld Lang Syne – WildBrain Studios in association with Apple; La Vie de Château – Films Grand Huit in association with Miyu Productions; Mum is Pouring Rain – Laïdak Films & Dandelooo; The Witcher: Nightmare of the Wolf – Studio Mir for Netflix	**Bestia – Trébol 3 Producciones, MALEZA Estudio**; Easter Eggs – Animal Tank, Brecht Van Elslande; MAALBEEK – Films Grand Huit Films à Vif; Night Bus – Joe Hsieh Independent Production; Steakhouse – Finta Film, Fabian & Fred, RTV Slovenija, Miyu Productions
Best Sponsored Production	Best Animated Television/Broadcast Production for Preschool Children
**A Future Begins – Nexus Studios**; Fleet Foxes - "Featherweight" – Sing-Sing; The Good Guest Guide to Japan – Airbnb, Chromosphere; Tiptoe & The Flying Machine – Nexus Studios; WandaVision - "Don't Touch That Dial" Title Sequence – Titmouse, Inc.	**Ada Twist, Scientist (Episode: "Twelve Angry Birds") – Laughing Wild, Higher Ground Productions, Wonder Worldwide, Netflix**; Muppet Babies (Episode: "Gonzo-Rella") – Oddbot Inc.; Odo (Episode: "Doddle Song") – Sixteen South and Letko; Stillwater (Episode: "Crossing Over / Kind of Blue") – Scholastic Entertainment, Gaumont, Polygon Pictures in association with Apple; Xavier Riddle and the Secret Museum (Episode: "I Am Ella Fitzgerald") – 9 Story Media Group, Brown Bag Films
Best Animated Television/Broadcast Production for Children	Best General Audience Animated Television/Broadcast Production
**Maya and the Three (Episode: "The Sun and the Moon") – Netflix**; Amphibia (Episode: "True Colors") – Walt Disney Television Animation; Carmen Sandiego (Episode: "The Himalayan Rescue Caper") – Houghton Mifflin Harcourt Publishing and DHX Media for Netflix; Dug Days (Episode: "Science") – Pixar Animation Studios; We the People (Episode: "Active Citizenship") – Laughing Wild, Higher Ground Productions, Netflix	**Arcane (Episode: "When These Walls Come Tumbling Down") – A Riot Games and Fortiche Production for Netflix**; Bob's Burgers (Episode: "Fingers-loose") – 20th TV, Bento Box Animation; Love, Death + Robots (Episode: "Ice") – Blur Studio for Netflix; Star Wars: Visions (Episode: "The Duel") – Kamikaze Douga; Tuca & Bertie (Episode: "The Dance") – The Tornante Company
Best Student Film
**Night of the Living Dread – Ida Melum, director; Danielle Goff, producer (National Film and Television School, UK)**; A Film About a Pudding – Roel Van Beek, director; Jack Pollington, producer (National Film and Television School, UK); HOPE – Ryoma Leneuf & Gabriel Martinez, directors; Nicolas Daguin, Guillaume Uchoa, Arthur Bollia, Benjamin Autour; producers (New3dge); I Am a Pebble – Yasmine Bresson and Maxime Le Chapelain, directors; Coline Moire, producer (ESMA); Slouch – Michael Bohnenstingl, director and producer (Film Academy Baden-Württemberg)

=== Individual achievement categories ===
Outstanding Achievement for Animated Effects in an Animated Television/Broadcast Production	Outstanding Achievement for Animated Effects in an Animated Production
**Arcane (Episode: "Oil and Water") – Guillaume Degroote, Aurélien Ressencourt, Martin Touzé, Frédéric Macé, Jérôme Dupré**; Castlevania (Episode: "The Endings") – Tam Lu, Adam Deats, Sam Deats; Maya and the Three (Episode: "The Sun and the Moon") – Alexander Feigin, Graham Wiebe, Pradeep Mynam, Michael Sun, Sergen Eren; Shaun The Sheep: The Flight Before Christmas – Jim Lewis; Trollhunters: Rise of the Titans – Greg Lev, Brandon Tyra, Prakash Dcunha, Vincent Chou, Chen Ling	**The Mitchells vs. the Machines – Christopher Logan, Man-Louk Chin, Devdatta Nerurkar, Pav Grochola, Filippo Maccari**; Belle – Ryo Horibe, Yohei Shimozawa; Encanto – Alex Moaveni, Dimitre Berberov, Bruce Wright, Scott Townsend, Dale Mayeda; Raya and the Last Dragon – Peter De Mund, Cong Wang, Robert Bennett, Joel Einhorn, Debbie Carlson; Vivo – Martin Furness, Lucy Maxian, Nachiket Pujari, Theodor Vandernoot, Stephanie Molk
Outstanding Achievement for Character Animation in an Animated Television / Broadcast Production	Outstanding Achievement for Character Animation in an Animated Feature Production
**Arcane (Episode: "The Monster You Created") – Léa Chervet**; Love, Death + Robots (Episode: "All Through the House") – Dan Gill; Namoo – Jon Paul Brower; Ultra City Smiths (Episode: "The Little Baby Hand Pinky Grip") – Ghazal Tahernia; We the People (Episode: "Active Citizenship") – Stephen Loveluck	**Encanto – Dave Hardin**; Luca – Tarun Lak; Raya and the Last Dragon – Jennifer Hager; The Boss Baby: Family Business – Ravi Kamble Govind; Wish Dragon – Ketan Adikhari
Outstanding Achievement for Character Animation in a Live Action Production	Outstanding Achievement for Character Animation in a Video Game
**Shang-Chi and the Legend of the Ten Rings – Karl Rapley, Sebastian Trujillo, Richard John Moore, Merlin Bela Wassilij Maertz, Pascal Raimbault**; Flora & Ulysses – Thomas Becker, Daniel Cavalcante, Philipp Winterstein, Victor Dinis, Thiago Martins; The Suicide Squad – Meena Ibrahim, Alvise Avati, Nicholas Cabana, Adam Goldstein, Lea Vera Toro; The Tomorrow War – Carmelo Leggiero, Cajun Hylton, Michel Alencar Magalhaes, Florent Limouzin, Dave Clayton; Y: The Last Man – Industrial Light & Magic Animation Team	**Ratchet & Clank: Rift Apart – Insomniac Games**; Disney Wonderful Worlds – Ludia; It Takes Two – Hazelight Studios Team; Kena: Bridge of Spirits – Ember Lab Team; Madrid Noir – Aziz Kocanaogullari
Outstanding Achievement for Character Design in an Animated Television / Broadcast Production	Outstanding Achievement for Character Design in an Animated Feature Production
**Arcane (Episode: "Some Mysteries Better Left Unsolved") – Evan Monteiro**; Batman: The Long Halloween (Episode: "Part One") – Otto Schmidt; Kid Cosmic (Episode: "The Rings of Power") – Craig McCracken; Maya and the Three (Episode: "The Sun and the Moon") – Jorge R. Gutierrez; Yuki 7 (Episode: "They Called Her Number Seven") – Keiko Murayama	**The Mitchells vs. the Machines – Lindsey Olivares**; Luca – Deanna Marsigliese; Raya and the Last Dragon – Ami Thompson; Ron's Gone Wrong – Julien Bizet; Vivo – Joe Moshier
Outstanding Achievement for Directing in an Animated Television / Broadcast Production	Outstanding Achievement for Directing in an Animated Feature Production
**Arcane (Episode: "The Monster You Created") – Pascal Charue, Arnaud Delord, Barthelemy Maunoury**; Amphibia (Episode: "True Colors") – Jenn Strickland, Kyler Spears; Crossing Swords (Episode: "Tent Pitching") – John Harvatine, Brad Schaffer, Ethan Marak; Hilda and the Mountain King – Andy Coyle; Maya and the Three (Episode: "The Sun and the Moon") – Jorge R. Gutierrez	**The Mitchells vs. the Machines – Mike Rianda, Jeff Rowe**; Belle – Mamoru Hosoda; Encanto – Jared Bush, Byron Howard, Charise Castro Smith; Flee – Jonas Poher Rasmussen, Kenneth Ladekjær; Luca – Enrico Casarosa
Outstanding Achievement for Editorial in an Animated Television / Broadcast Production	Outstanding Achievement for Editorial in an Animated Feature Production
**What If...? (Episode: "What If... Ultron Won?") – Joel Fisher, Graham Fisher, Sharia Davis, Basuki Juwono, Adam Spieckerman**; Amphibia (Episode: "True Colors") – Jennifer Calbi, Julie Anne Lau, Yoonah Yim, Andrew Sorcini, David Vasquez; Arlo the Alligator Boy – Steve Downs; Love, Death + Robots (Episode: "Pop Squad") – Julian Clarke, Matt Mariska, Valerian Zamel, Brian Swanson, Ky Kenyon; Tom and Jerry in New York (Episode: "Billboard Jumble") – Michael D'Ambrosio, Jeff Small	**The Mitchells vs. the Machines – Greg Levitan, Collin Wightman, T.J. Young, Tony Ferdinand, Bret Allen**; Encanto – Jeremy Milton, John Wheeler, Pace Paulsen, Brian Estrada; Flee – Janus Billeskov Jansen; Luca – Catherine Apple, Jason Hudak, Jennifer Jew, Tim Fox, David Suther; Raya and the Last Dragon – Fabienne Rawley, Shannon Stein, Todd Fulkerson, Rick Hammel, Brian Millman
Outstanding Achievement for Music in an Animated Television / Broadcast Production	Outstanding Achievement for Music in an Animated Feature Production
**Maya and the Three (Episode: "The Sun and the Moon") – Tim Davies, Gustavo Santaolalla**; Blush – Joy Ngiaw; Hilda and the Mountain King – Ryan Carlson; Mila – Flavio Gargano; Mira, Royal Detective (Episode: "The Eid Mystery") – Amritha Vaz, Matthew Tishler, Jeannie Lurie	**Encanto – Lin-Manuel Miranda, Germaine Franco**; Luca – Dan Romer; Poupelle of Chimney Town – Youki Kojima, Yuta Bandoh; Raya and the Last Dragon – James Newton Howard, Jhené Aiko; Vivo – Alex Lacamoire, Lin-Manuel Miranda
Outstanding Achievement for Production Design in an Animated Television / Broadcast Production	Outstanding Achievement for Production Design in an Animated Feature Production
**Arcane (Episode: "Happy Progress Day!") – Julien Georgel, Aymeric Kevin, Arnaud Baudry**; Arlo the Alligator Boy – Israel Sanchez, Margaret Wuller, Michelle Haejung Park, Kayla Jones, Tania Franco; Love, Death + Robots (Episode: "Ice") – Robert Valley; Maya and the Three (Episode: "The Sun and the Moon") – Jorge R. Gutierrez, Paul Sullivan, Gerald de Jesus, Richard Chen; Yuki 7 (Episode: "They Called Her Number Seven") – Chromosphere Team	**The Mitchells vs. the Machines – Lindsey Olivares, Toby Wilson, Dave Bleich**; Belle – Tomm Moore, Ross Stewart, Alice Dieudonné, Almu Redondo, Maria Pareja; Raya and the Last Dragon – Paul Felix, Mingjue Helen Chen, Cory Loftis; Ron's Gone Wrong – Aurélien Predal, Till Nowak and Nathan Crowley; Vivo – Carlos Zaragoza, Wendell Dalit, Andy Harkness
Outstanding Achievement for Storyboarding in an Animated Television / Broadcast Production	Outstanding Achievement for Storyboarding in an Animated Feature Production
**Arcane (Episode: "When These Walls Come Tumbling Down") – Simon Andriveau**; Invincible (Episode: "Where I Really Come From") – Jay Baker; Kid Cosmic (Episode: "The Big Win") – Justin Nichols; Love, Death + Robots (Episode: "Pop Squad") – Jennifer Yuh Nelson; The Ghost and Molly McGee (Episode: "All Systems No") – Johnny Castuciano	**Encanto – Jason Hand**; Raya and the Last Dragon – Luis Logam; Spirit Untamed – Gary Graham; The Addams Family 2 – Steven Garcia; Vivo – Carlos Romero
Outstanding Achievement for Voice Acting in an Animated Television / Broadcast Production	Outstanding Achievement for Voice Acting in an Animated Feature Production
**Ella Purnell as Jinx in Arcane (Episode: "When These Walls Come Tumbling Down")**; Michael J. Woodard as Arlo in Arlo the Alligator Boy; Parvesh Cheena as Zulius in Centaurworld (Episode: "Johnny Teatimes Be Best Competition: A Quest for the Sash"); Kimberly Brooks as Bumblebee in DC Super Hero Girls (Episode: "#EnterNightSting"); Charlie Saxton as Toby Domzalski in Trollhunters: Rise of the Titans	**Abbi Jacobson as Katie Mitchell in The Mitchells vs. the Machines**; John Leguizamo as Bruno Madrigal in Encanto; Stephanie Beatriz as Mirabel Madrigal in Encanto; Jack Dylan Grazer as Alberto Scorfano in Luca; Kelly Marie Tran as Raya in Raya and the Last Dragon
Outstanding Achievement for Writing in an Animated Television / Broadcast Production	Outstanding Achievement for Writing in an Animated Feature Production
**Arcane (Episode: "The Monster You Created") – Christian Linke, Alex Yee**; Maya and the Three (Episode: "Chapter 4: The Skull") – Silvia Olivas, Jorge R. Guitterez; Muppet Babies (Episode: Gonzo-Rella) – Ghia Godfree; The Mighty Ones (Episode: "Berry's Pet Threat") – Jillian Goldfluss, Erica Jones, Nicolette Wood; Tuca & Bertie (Episode: "Planteau") – Lisa Hanawalt	**The Mitchells vs. the Machines – Mike Rianda, Jeff Rowe**; Belle – Mamoru Hosoda; Flee – Jonas Poher Rasmussen, Amin Nawabi; Luca – Jesse Andrews, Mike Jones; Raya and the Last Dragon – Qui Nguyen, Adele Lim

=== Additional Individual Awards ===
==== June Foray Award ====
- Renzo and Sayoko Kinoshita

==== Special Achievement in Animation ====
- Glenn Vilppu

==== Ub Iwerks Award ====
- Python Software Foundation

==== Winsor McCay Lifetime Achievement Awards ====
- Ruben A. Aquino, Lillian Schwartz and Toshio Suzuki

== Multiple awards and nominations ==
=== Films ===
The following films received multiple nominations:

Nominations	Film
10	Raya and the Last Dragon
9	Encanto
8	The Mitchells vs. the Machines
8	Luca
5	Belle
5	Vivo
4	Flee
3	Arlo the Alligator Boy
2	Hilda and the Mountain King
2	Ron's Gone Wrong
2	Trollhunters: Rise of the Titans

The following films received multiple awards:

Wins	Film
8	The Mitchells vs. the Machines
3	Encanto

=== Television/Broadcast ===
The following shows received multiple nominations:

Nominations	Show
9	Arcane
7	Maya and the Three
5	Love, Death & Robots
3	Amphibia
2	Kid Cosmic
2	Muppet Babies
2	Tuca & Bertie
2	We the People
2	Yuki 7

The following shows received multiple awards:

Wins	Show
9	Arcane
2	Maya and the Three
