= Mexopolis =

American-Mexican production company

Mexopolis logo

Mexopolis (also known as Mexopolis Animation Studio) is a Mexican production company founded in 1994 by Jorge R. Gutiérrez and Sandra Equihua in Tijuana, Mexico. It produced the television series El Tigre: The Adventures of Manny Rivera, the film The Book of Life, and most recently the limited series Maya and the Three. The company is currently located in Studio City, California.

== Works ==
- 2002: Pepe the Bull (pilot and cancelled)
- 2005: El Tigre: Manny Rivera (pilot)
- 2007–08: El Tigre: The Adventures of Manny Rivera
- 2010: Carmen Got Expelled (pilot and cancelled)
- 2010–13: Mad (various skits)
- 2012: Super Macho Fighter (cancelled)
- 2014: The Book of Life
- 2020: We the People / Immigration (music video)
- 2021: Maya and the Three
- 2024: The Simpsons (Treehouse of Horror XXXV opening sequence)
- TBA: I, Chihuahua
- TBA: Speedy Gonzales
