= Maya and the Three =

Mexican-American animated television miniseries

- Promotional poster
- Genre: Fantasy; Adventure; Action
- Created by: Jorge R. Gutiérrez
- Written by: Jorge R. Gutiérrez
- Directed by: Jorge R. Gutiérrez
- Voices of: Zoe Saldaña; Diego Luna; Allen Maldonado; Stephanie Beatriz; Gabriel Iglesias; Alfred Molina; Kate del Castillo
- Theme music composer: Gustavo Santaolalla
- Composers: Tim Davies; Keiichi Suzuki
- Countries of origin: Japan; Australia; New Zealand; United States; Canada; Mexico
- Original languages: English; Spanish
- No. of episodes: 9

Production
- Executive producer: Jorge R. Gutiérrez
- Producer: Tim Yoon
- Editor: Myra Lopez
- Running time: 26–44 minutes
- Production companies: Netflix Animation Studios; Mexopolis

Original release
- Network: Netflix
- Release: October 22, 2021

Maya and the Three (Spanish title: Maya y los tres) is an animated fantasy television miniseries created by Jorge R. Gutiérrez, produced by Netflix Animation and Mexopolis, animated by Tangent Animation.

The nine-episode series premiered on Netflix on October 22, 2021.

== Premise ==
Set in a world based on late pre-colonial Mesoamerica, Maya, a warrior princess, is celebrating her fifteenth birthday, but when the underworld gods appear and announce she must pay for her family's misdeeds, everything changes. If she refuses to go along, the world itself will be ravaged by the gods, so she embarks on a quest to fulfill a prophecy that says that three warriors will appear who will help her defeat these gods and save humanity itself from destruction.

== Voice cast ==
- Zoe Saldaña as Princess Maya of Teca, Eagle Warrior, Daughter of the King of Teca
- Gabriel Iglesias as Picchu
- Diego Luna as Zatz, the Prince of Bats, son of Camazotz
- Gael García Bernal as Lance, Dagger, and Shield, the Jaguar Brothers, Maya's older triplet half-brothers
- Rita Moreno as Ah Puch
- Alfred Molina as Lord Mictlan, the God of War
- Allen Maldonado as Rico
  - Andy Santana as Young Rico
- Stephanie Beatriz as Chimi
- Kate del Castillo as Lady Micte, the Goddess of Death and Maya's biological mother
- Danny Trejo as Cabrakan, the God of Earthquakes
- Cheech Marin as Hura & Can, the Gods of Wind & Storms
- Rosie Perez as Cipactli, the Goddess of Alligators
- Queen Latifah as Gran Bruja, daughter of Gran Brujo
- Wyclef Jean as Gran Brujo
- Isabela Merced as the Widow Queen
- Chelsea Rendon as Acat, the Goddess of Tattoos
- Joaquín Cosío as Camazotz, the God of Bats
- Carlos Alazraqui as Chivo, the God of Dark Magic
- Eric Bauza as Vucub, the God of Jungle Animals
- Grey DeLisle as Xtabay, the Goddess of Illusions and as Bone, Goddess of Thievery, sister of Skull
- Alanna Ubach as Skull, Goddess of Thievery and sister of Bone
- Jorge R. Gutiérrez as King Teca, Maya's father
- Sandra Equihua as Queen Teca, Maya's stepmother
- John DiMaggio as Bear Killah and Barbarian King, father of the barbarian princess and leader of the pumas.
- Carolina Ravassa as Barbarian Princess
- Dee Bradley Baker as Chiapa
- Hailey Hermida as Eagle

== Production ==
=== Development ===
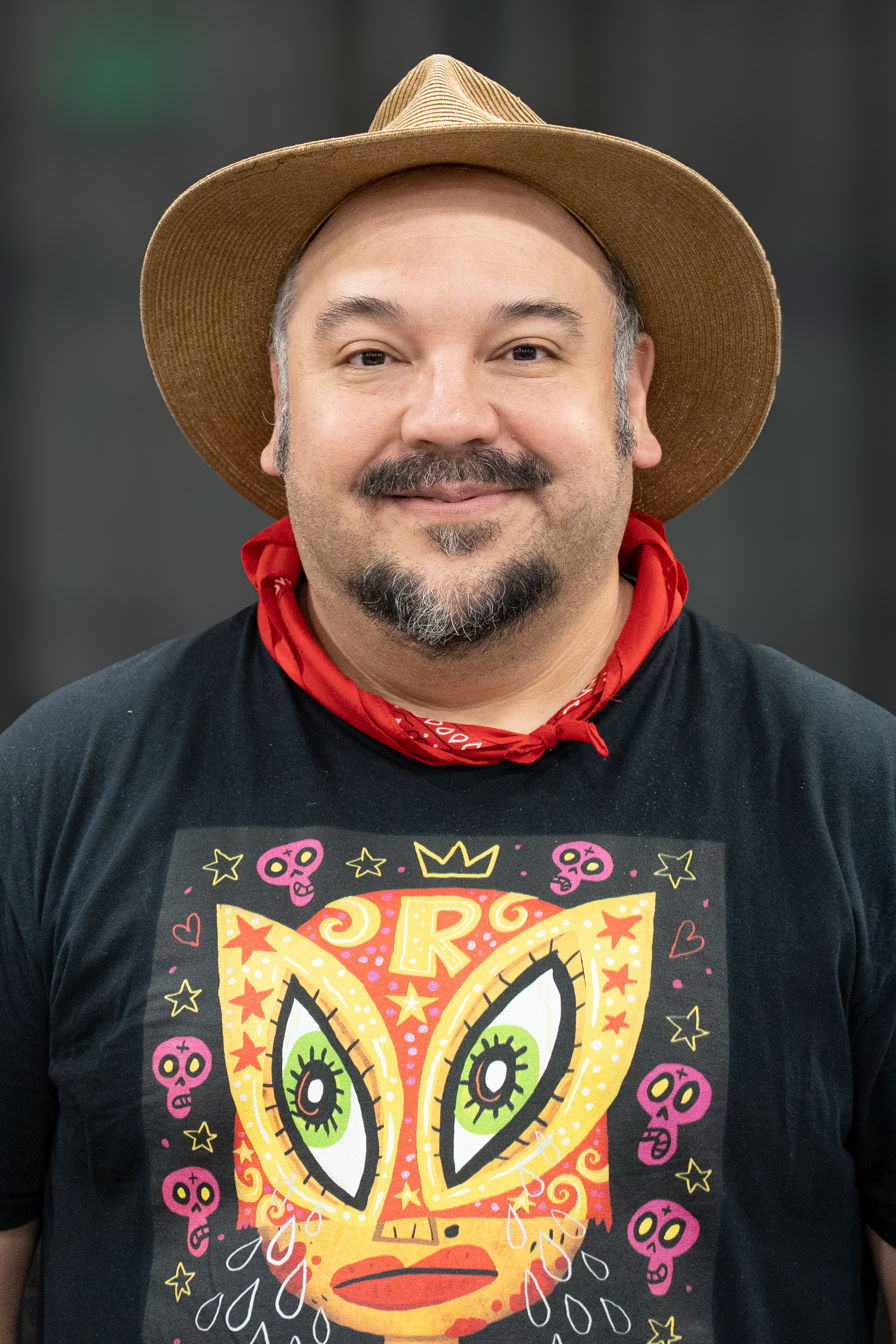
Jorge Gutierrez at Comic Con Oakland 2026

In November 2018, it was reported that Netflix was developing an animated television miniseries about a Mesoamerican warrior. The series had Jorge Gutiérrez as the director, creator and executive producer, while Tim Yoon was a producer, Silvia Olivas and Jeff Ranjo were co-executive producers. Gutiérrez, Olivas, Doug Langdale and Candie Kelty Langdale are writers, and Ranjo is the head of story for the series. The series was described by Gutiérrez, in October 2018, as equivalent to a Mexican version of The Lord of the Rings, "but hilarious."

On September 15, 2021, Gutiérrez described an exclusive clip from the series, saying the scene was inspired by Street Fighter 2, Crouching Tiger, Hidden Dragon, Kill Bill, Ninja Scroll and a "chola fight" he saw in Tijuana, Mexico. Gutiérrez told Skwigly that the series is "deeply inspired by the glorious Mesoamerican art" and Museo Nacional de Antropologia exhibits. He noted that the show's protagonist, Maya, is inspired by his mother, wife, and sister, and hinted that it would have similarities to his previous works, El Tigre and The Book of Life.

The series closed the Guadalajara Film Festival, on October 9, 2021, with the airing of two of the show's episodes at a special event.

The series was created using the open source Blender 3D animation software.

== Episodes ==
No.	Title	Directed by	Written by	Original release date
1	"Chapter 1: Quinceañera"	Jorge R. Gutiérrez	Jorge R. Gutiérrez	October 22, 2021
Queen Teca is one of the two rulers of the kingdom of Teca alongside her husband, King Teca, whose overprotected fifteen-year-old daughter Princess Maya's tomboyish and ready-to-rumble personality has driven her into isolating her from the dangerous world around her, completely expressing her strained relationship with her. Feeling trapped by her status as princess, Maya dreads the coronation being held on her fifteenth birthday. However, as the coronation proceeds, with the Luna Island, Jungle Lands, and Golden Mountains kingdoms witnessing the spectacle, a young man named Zatz, the Prince of Bats, delivers an ultimatum: give Maya to the gods to be sacrificed or they shall lay waste to the world. After Zatz proves his strength by easily defeating Maya's father and brothers, the other kingdoms refuse to join with Teca to fight for her. In order to protect Maya, King Teca and his army prepare to embark on a mission to destroy the door to the underworld--the Divine Gate.
2	"Chapter 2: The Prophecy"	Jorge R. Gutiérrez	Jorge R. Gutiérrez	October 22, 2021
King Teca and his forces set off for the Divine Gate, but are encountered by the leader of the gods, Lord Mictlan, who single-handedly vanquishes the army, leaving only King Teca and the family's jaguar Chiapa the sole survivors. Following the funeral of the fallen armymen, including Maya's triplet brothers, she receives a message from them, implying that the prophecy, thought to revolve around King Teca and the triplets, was misconstrued, instead telling of a Rooster Wizard, a Skull Archer and a Puma Warrior, each hailing from the three kingdoms. Donning her mother's old outfit and her father's first weapon, Maya begins her journey to gather the three prophesied warriors. However, Acat, the Goddess of Tattoos, tries to weaken Maya in order to capture her. When Acat ambushes her the following night, Maya, despite struggling at first, defeats Acat, only to be tricked into mercifully sparing her. Zatz, disappointed in Acat for wasting her time trying to capture Maya, terminates their contract, causing Acat to resign in tears as Maya finally arrives at Luna Island.
3	"Chapter 3: The Rooster"	Jorge R. Gutiérrez	Silvia Cardenas Olivas, Jorge R. Gutiérrez	October 22, 2021
On Luna Island, Maya heads to the Council of Wizards to enlist Gran Bruja's help in the battle against the gods, but she is only laughed out of the room. She meets a seemingly normal wizard named Rico, said to be the greatest wizard who ever lived. However, Rico is timid and is an outcast due to being an orphan and possessing great Peasant Magic that caused him to accidentally kill the Gran Bruno as a child. Maya convinces Rico to join her quest, and the wizard gets a chance to prove himself as the two are ambushed by the gods Cabrakan and Cipactli. After defeating the couple, Cipactli shows them the way to the jungle lands. After Maya and Rico make it to the jungle lands, they are ambushed by the guards and are captured.
4	"Chapter 4: The Skull"	Jorge R. Gutiérrez	Silvia Cardenas Olivas, Jorge R. Gutiérrez	October 22, 2021
Maya and Rico arrive at the Jungle Lands, but are ambushed and captured by the guards and taken to the kingdom's young ruler, the Widow Queen. She informs them of the perfect candidate of the prophesized Skull Archer: a girl named Chimi, who was discriminated at birth due to her pale white appearance after her mother passed away. She was raised by the animals in the jungle, but was left alone and distrustful of humans after the Widow Queen's father burned down the entire jungle, killing her animal friends. Maya and Rico head into the jungle to talk with Chimi, whom Rico immediately develops a crush on. After a short dispute, Chimi agrees to join them, under the promise that Maya introduces her to Lady Micte. Maya and Rico earn Chimi's trust when gods Hura and Can ambush them.
5	"Chapter 5: The Puma"	Jorge R. Gutiérrez	Candie Langdale, Doug Langdale, Jorge R. Gutiérrez	October 22, 2021
Arriving at their next destination, the Golden Mountains, Rico accidentally sets off a trap that causes the group to be separated from Chiapa, but this leads them to the rulers of the Golden Mountains, the Barbarian King and Princess. However, the two reveal they are evacuating the kingdom to avoid the impending doom of the gods' rage. Luckily, the Barbarian Princess gives Maya information on the potential candidate for the Puma Warrior: Picchu, a barbarian who has recently been seen fighting the mist, grieving the death of his parents from a ruthless warrior. Picchu, blinded by grief, attacks the group, but calms down after realizing his blight, instantly agreeing to join the group. Once the group leaves, Zatz appears, calling Maya out on her lying to them about entering the Divine Gate rather than destroying it. Maya angrily reveals her deception to Zatz, causing the others to lose trust in her. Unfortunately, things get worse when the gods attack Teca.
6	"Chapter 6: Maya and the Three"	Jorge R. Gutiérrez	Candie Langdale, Doug Langdale, Jorge R. Gutiérrez	October 22, 2021
Lord Mictlan's army attacks Teca, but Maya and her friends fight back. When the gods return, a second battle reveals strengths they didn't know they had. While fighting the evil gods, Vucub, God of Jungle Animals decides to help Chimi by teaching her to unlock magical arrows she can manifest out of thin air, and in her ensuing battle with Bone and Skull, the Goddesses of Thievery, Maya kills Skull, making the evil gods retreat in realization of Maya's true potential. With this victory, Maya and her friends head to the Divine Gate to destroy Lord Mictlan.
7	"Chapter 7: The Divine Gate"	Jorge R. Gutiérrez	Candie Langdale, Doug Langdale, Jorge R. Gutiérrez	October 22, 2021
After a long journey, Maya's group arrives at the Divine Gate. Unable to figure out the key to opening the portal, Chimi's memories of her mother cause the Gate to transform into a towering golem guardian. In the resulting scuffle, Maya uses an emblem she had owned since her infancy to quell the guardian and open the gate. Inside, they encounter Zatz, who intends to join them in their mission. He leads them to the gods' palace, where they ambush him by pretending to be caught. However, despite seemingly gaining the upper hand, Mictlan uses his powers to hypnotize Rico, Chimi and Picchu into attacking Maya. In the chaos, Maya frees her friends, but ends up seized by Mictlan, who prepares to sacrifice her until Chimi stabs him with a knife (secretly given to her by a remorseful Micte), and Maya sends him plummeting down into the lava, allowing them to escape with the other gods in hot pursuit. A large owl seemingly helps them but is unable to fly higher due to being weighed down by Picchu. Picchu shares a farewell with the group before staying behind and destroying the exit to the surface. Mictlan reappears, and Picchu faces the gods alone, resulting in his death. In the afterlife, Picchu reunites with his parents.
8	"Chapter 8: The Bat and the Owl"	Jorge R. Gutiérrez	Silvia Cardenas Olivas, Jorge R. Gutiérrez	October 22, 2021
After escaping the Divine Gate, Maya, stricken with guilt, has her allies head to their homelands to warn them of Mictlan's arrival, while Zatz and Maya develop a relationship of their own before going to find the Golden Mountains kingdom. The owl that saved them is revealed to be Micte, who shares her story to a bitter Maya, explaining that she was heartbroken to put her daughter in danger as a baby, leaving her with King Teca and his wife. While Maya and Micte return to Teca, Rico, Chimi, and Zatz rally the kingdoms into joining with Teca to battle the gods.
9	"Chapter 9: The Sun and the Moon"	Jorge R. Gutiérrez	Jorge R. Gutiérrez	October 22, 2021
A fateful battle begins in Teca between Lord Mictlan and his army and Maya and her allies. Gods from the underworld like Cabrakan and his wife show up to help Maya and her army after she helped them fix their marriage in the previous episode, Vucub appears and explains to Chimi and the jungle lands queen that Mictlan had taken his eyes and aids them to defeat them. Lord Mictlan ends up killing all of his gods by stealing their hearts to obtain power, much to their horror and anger. Maya's stepmother ends up giving birth to twins. Maya and Zatz are individually transformed into the sun and moon after destroying Mictlan together, allowing them to see their family every dawn and dusk.

== Release ==
The series was released on Netflix on October 22, 2021. Netflix described it as an "animated event told in nine epic chapters". Each episode in the limited series is 30 minutes long, comprising a total of 4 and half hours.

== Reception ==
On Rotten Tomatoes, the series has an approval rating of 100% based on 14 reviews, with an average rating of 8.60/10. The website's critical consensus reads, "Jorge R. Gutiérrez's joyous fantasy Maya and the Three excels thanks to a blockbuster-caliber voice cast and striking animation, delivering an adventure that will enrapture adults and kids alike."

Lovia Gyarkye, writing for The Hollywood Reporter, called every scene a "feast for the eyes" (...) adding that it " is an engaging and twisting adventure, rooted in the rich history of Indigenous cultures and led by Maya, who is seeking answers about her past and trying to save her kingdom", concluding that "each episode offers opportunities to deepen our understanding of this fantastical world and to relish the visual depth of Gutiérrez's adeptly constructed and absolutely stunning series." Cristina Escobar of Remezcla described the show as "decidedly Mexican," noted that the series is "the brainchild of Mexican/Mexican Americans," and pointed out ways that the series "honors Mexican culture," especially on ideas about death, intense imagery, tying one's love to sacrifice, the language, and uplifting Indigenous people.

=== Accolades ===
Year	Award	Category	Nominee	Result	Ref
2022	49th Annie Awards	Best Animated Television / Broadcast Production for Children	Maya and the Three (Episode: "The Sun and the Moon")	Won	
2022	49th Annie Awards	Outstanding Achievement for Animated Effects in an Animated Television / Broadcast Production	Maya and the Three (Episode: "The Sun and the Moon") — Alexander Feigin, Graham Wiebe, Pradeep Mynam, Micheal Sun, Sergen Eren	Nominated	
2022	49th Annie Awards	Outstanding Achievement for Character Design in an Animated Television / Broadcast Production	Maya and the Three (Episode: "The Sun and the Moon") — Jorge R. Gutierrez	Nominated	
2022	49th Annie Awards	Outstanding Achievement for Directing in an Animated Television / Broadcast Production	Maya and the Three (Episode: "The Sun and the Moon") — Jorge R. Gutierrez	Nominated	
2022	49th Annie Awards	Outstanding Achievement for Music in an Animated Television / Broadcast Production	Maya and the Three (Episode: "The Sun and the Moon") — Tim Davies, Gustavo Santaolalla	Won	
2022	49th Annie Awards	Outstanding Achievement for Production Design in an Animated Television / Broadcast Production	Maya and the Three (Episode: "The Sun and the Moon") — Jorge R. Gutierrez, Paul Sullivan, Gerald de Jesus, Richard Chen	Nominated	
2022	49th Annie Awards	Outstanding Achievement for Writing in an Animated Television / Broadcast Production	Maya and the Three (Episode: "The Skull") — Silvia Olivas, Jorge R. Guitterez	Nominated	
2022	25th British Academy Children's Awards	Outstanding International Series	Maya and the Three	Nominated	
2022	1st Children's and Family Emmy Awards	Outstanding Special Class Animated Program	Maya and the Three	Nominated	
2022	1st Children's and Family Emmy Awards	Outstanding Promotional Announcement	Maya and the Three	Won	
2022	1st Children's and Family Emmy Awards	Outstanding Editing for an Animated Program	Myra Lopez	Nominated	
2022	1st Children's and Family Emmy Awards	Outstanding Sound Editing and Sound Mixing for an Animated Program	Jack Cucci, Tavish Grade, Andres Locsey, David Barbee, Masanobu "Tomi" Tomita, John Cucci, Dan O'Connell, Scott Martin Gershin, Chris Richardson and Andrew Vernon	Won	
2022	1st Children's and Family Emmy Awards	Outstanding Writing for an Animated Program	Jeff Ranjo, Tim Yoon, Jorge Gutierrez, Candie Langdale, Doug Langdale and Silvia Olivas	Won	
2022	1st Children's and Family Emmy Awards	Individual Achievement in Animation	Alex Konstad	Won	

== Cancelled follow-up miniseries ==
In May 2022, Netflix canceled its follow-up miniseries, Kung-Fu Space Punch. The project was originally conceived as a stand-alone feature film at the 2017 Annecy Film Festival, but transitioned to a 9-episode miniseries follow-up to Maya and the Three sometime after. Showrunner Gutiérrez stated in a tweet on Twitter that "the project is not dead. Just not moving forward at Netflix Animation."
