= Tim Davies (musician) =

Australian orchestrator and composer (born 1972)

- Born: 1972 (age 53–54)
- Occupations: Orchestrator, conductor, arranger, composer

Tim Davies (born 1972) is an Australian orchestrator and composer for film, television, video games and the concert stage.

== Education ==
Davies studied percussion and composition at the Queensland Conservatorium in Brisbane, and composition at the Elder Conservatorium and the University of Melbourne.

== Career ==
After moving to the United States in 1998, he began his career working as a music arranger and orchestrator for numerous features, including Plan B, The First $20 Million Is Always the Hardest, and Missing Brendan. From there, he went on to work as the orchestrator on numerous larger budget films, including When a Stranger Calls, Death Race, Repo Men, and Kick Ass 2. As of 2021, he was the lead orchestrator for composers Christophe Beck, Mark Mothersbaugh, and Fil Eisler. He was lead orchestrator for Frozen and Frozen 2, Ant-Man and Ant-Man and the Wasp, Free Guy, The Lego Movie 2, The Croods: A New Age, Superintelligence and Thunder Force. He also conducted an arrangement of "When You Wish Upon a Star", composed by Christophe Beck, for Disney's 100th anniversary logo.

In 2002, Davies also started working in the realm of television, as the music arranger for the TV Movie Fitzgerald. Since then, he has worked as conductor and orchestrator on series such as Invasion, Pushing Daisies, Revenge, Empire, WandaVision, and Hawkeye.

In 2014, Davies collaborated with Gustavo Santaolalla to compose the score to the film The Book of Life. In 2015, Guillermo del Toro, one of the producers on The Book of Life, brought Davies on to help score his movie Crimson Peak. From 2016 to 2018 Davies then composed the score to del Toro's animated Netflix show Trollhunters: Tales of Arcadia. In 2021 Davies reunited with The Book of Life director Jorge Gutierrez to score Gutierrez's Netflix show Maya and the Three.

Davies has also worked as the conductor and orchestrator on numerous video game titles, his debut work being for Sony's 2005 SOCOM 3 U.S. Navy SEALs. Since then, he's worked on titles such as Prototype, Resistance 3, Batman: Arkham City, Spider-Man, and Halo Infinite. He provided symphonic sound design on The Last of Us and Batman: Arkham Knight.

Davies also has experience as an arranger. In 2014, he arranged and played drums for the twentieth anniversary concert of NAS' Illmatic. In 2015, he served as lead arranger for Kendrick Lamar's performance of To Pimp a Butterfly, with the National Symphony at the Kennedy Center. In 2018, Davies provided arrangements for Kenny 'Babyface' Edmonds, again with the National Symphony at the Kennedy Center. Davies has also contributed a number of arrangements for concerts of the Metropole Orkest, working with artists such as Ledisi, Donny McCaslin, Cory Henry, and Moses Sumney.

== Tim Davies Big Band ==
Tim Davies Big Band was founded in 1998, shortly before Davies moved to the United States. Once in LA, he created a new iteration of the band. Their first album, Epic, was released in 2002, followed, in 2009, by Dialmentia. In 2010, Davies was awarded a Grammy for his composition "Counting to Infinity". In 2016, Davies released his third album, The Expensive Train Set, incorporating performances from both Melbourne and LA iterations of his band, for which he received another Grammy nomination.

== Filmography ==
=== Films ===
Year	Title	Credits
2026	The Sheep Detectives	Conductor, orchestrator
2026	Hoppers	Conductor, orchestrator
2025	Final Destination Bloodlines	Conductor, orchestrator
2025	A Minecraft Movie	Conductor, orchestrator
2022	The Bob's Burgers Movie	Conductor, arranger, orchestrator
2022	Hotel Transylvania: Transformania	Lead orchestrator
2021	Free Guy	Conductor, lead orchestrator
2021	Snake Eyes	Lead orchestrator
2021	The Mitchells vs. the Machines	Lead orchestrator
2021	Thunder Force	Lead orchestrator
2021	Flora and Ulysses	Conductor, orchestrator
2020	Superintelligence	Lead orchestrator
2020	The Christmas Chronicles: Part Two	Lead orchestrator
2020	The Croods: A New Age	Lead orchestrator
2019	Frozen II	Conductor, lead orchestrator
2017	Going in Style	Lead orchestrator
2017	Rings	Conductor, lead orchestrator
2017	Monster Trucks	Conductor, lead orchestrator
2016	La La Land	Conductor
2016	Trolls	Conductor, lead orchestrator
2016	Miss Peregrine's Home for Peculiar Children	Conductor, lead orchestrator
2016	Independence Day: Resurgence	Conductor, lead orchestrator
2015	The Peanuts Movie	Conductor, orchestrator
2015	Scouts Guide to the Zombie Apocalypse	Conductor, lead orchestrator
2015	Crimson Peak	Composer (additional music)
2015	Ant-Man	Conductor, orchestrator
2015	Minions	Lead orchestrator
2015	Hot Tub Time Machine 2	Conductor
2014	The Book of Life	Conductor, score arranger
2014	Edge of Tomorrow	Conductor
2014	Muppets Most Wanted	Conductor, lead orchestrator
2013	Frozen	Conductor, orchestrator
2013	Kick-Ass 2	Orchestrator
2013	White House Down	Conductor
2013	The Hangover Part III	Conductor
2012	Jack Reacher	Conductor
2011	The Three Musketeers	Lead orchestrator
2010	Despicable Me	Conductor
2010	Hot Tub Time Machine	Conductor
2010	Repo Men	Orchestrator
2010	The Wolfman	Conductor
2009	Cirque du Freak: The Vampire's Assistant	Conductor
2008	Death Race	Conductor
2007	The Simpsons Movie	Orchestrator
2006	When a Stranger Calls	Conductor
2005	Forbidden Warrior	Orchestrator
2004	The Final Cut	Music arranger
2002	The First $20 Million Is Always the Hardest	Orchestrator
2001	Plan B	Conductor, music arranger
2000	Bit Players (Short)	Music arranger

=== Television ===
Year	Title	Credits
2021	Hawkeye	Lead orchestrator
2021	Maya and the Three	Composer, conductor
2021	WandaVision	Lead orchestrator
2020	Council of Dads	Lead orchestrator
2019	What/If	Lead Orchestrator
2016	Trollhunters	Composer
2015–2020	Empire	Lead orchestrator
2014–2015	Revenge	Lead orchestrator
2014	Bates Motel	Conductor (2 episodes)
2011	Teen Wolf	Orchestrator (12 episodes)
2010–2011	The Event	Conductor, orchestrator (15 episodes)
2010–2011	No Ordinary Family	Conductor
2007–2009	Pushing Daisies	Conductor, orchestrator
2005–2006	Invasion	Conductor, orchestrator
2002	Fitzgerald	Music arranger

=== Video games ===
Year	Title	Credits
2021	Halo Infinite	Lead orchestrator
2018	Spider-Man	Lead orchestrator
2015	Batman: Arkham Knight	Lead orchestrator, symphonic sound designer
2013	Knack	Orchestrator
2013	The Last of Us	Symphonic sound design
2011	Batman: Arkham City	Conductor, orchestrator
2011	Resistance 3	Orchestrator
2011	Infamous 2	Orchestrator
2010	Lost Planet 2	Orchestrator
2010	Darksiders	Orchestrator
2009	Ratchet & Clank Future: A Crack in Time	Orchestrator
2009	The Sims 3	Conductor
2009	Prototype	Lead orchestrator
2008	Gears of War 2	Conductor
2007	The Simpsons Game	Conductor, lead orchestrator
2007	Clive Barker's Jericho	Conductor
2005	SOCOM 3 U.S. Navy SEALs	Conductor, orchestrator

== Awards and nominations ==
Year	Award	Category	Nominee	Result
2010	Grammy	Best Instrumental Composition	"Counting to Infinity"	Nominated
2016	Grammy	Best Instrumental Composition	"The Expensive Train Set: An Epic Sarahnade"	Nominated
2017	Annie Awards	Outstanding Achievement, Music in an Animated TV/Broadcast Production	Alexandre Desplat and Tim Davies, Trollhunters: Tales of Arcadia, "Becoming: Part 1"	Nominated
2022	Annie Awards	Best Music - TV/Media	Tim Davies and Gustavo Santaolalla, Maya and the Three, "The Sun and the Moon"	Won
