= El Tigre: The Adventures of Manny Rivera =

Animated television series

- Genre: Superhero; Action-adventure; Slapstick; Comedy
- Created by: Jorge R. Gutiérrez; Sandra Equihua
- Directed by: Dave Thomas; Gabe Swarr
- Voices of: Alanna Ubach; Grey DeLisle; Eric Bauza; Carlos Alazraqui; April Stewart
- Composer: Shawn Patterson
- Countries of origin: United States; Mexico
- Original language: English
- No. of seasons: 1
- No. of episodes: 26 (50 segments)

Production
- Executive producers: Sandra Equihua; Jorge R. Gutierrez
- Running time: 11 minutes (short-length episodes); 22 minutes (long-length specials)
- Production companies: Mexopolis; Nickelodeon Animation Studio

Original release
- Network: Nickelodeon
- Release: March 3, 2007 – June 20, 2008
- Network: Nicktoons
- Release: August 7 – September 13, 2008

El Tigre: The Adventures of Manny Rivera (also often shortened to El Tigre) is an animated superhero comedy television series created by Jorge R. Gutiérrez and Sandra Equihua for Nickelodeon and produced by Nickelodeon Animation Studio in association with Mexopolis. It was the network's first series primarily animated using Adobe Flash. The series centers on a 13-year-old boy named Manny Rivera, better known as "El Tigre", who is the son of a legendary hero known as "White Pantera" and the grandson of an evil super villain known as "Puma Loco". Manny tries his best to choose between being good or evil while dealing with bizarre enemies, aiming to gain his belt's buckle to become a tiger-themed superhero. The show is set in Miracle City, a fictional city based on and located at Tijuana, Baja California, where Gutierrez grew up and Equihua was born.

El Tigre first aired as a sneak peek on February 19, 2007, before officially premiering on March 3, 2007 on Nickelodeon and aired its first 22 episodes until June 20, 2008. The show was then moved to Nickelodeon's spinoff network, Nicktoons, where it aired its remaining four episodes from August 7, 2008, to September 13, 2008. El Tigre won a total of five Daytime Emmy Awards and two Annie Awards. Additionally, it has spawned several merchandise, including home media and digital releases, a video game, an art book, and for a brief time, a collection of fast food toys.

== Premise ==
Set in the fictional crime-ridden Mexican-American metropolis of Miracle City, El Tigre follows the adventures of Manny Rivera, a 13-year-old boy with superpowers trying to choose between being good or evil. Manny's father is a superhero known as White Pantera and wants Manny to grow up to be good and fight evil. Manny's grandfather is a supervillain known as Puma Loco who thinks Manny should go to the dark side.

== Characters ==
=== Main characters ===
- Alanna Ubach as Manuel "Manny" Rivera / El Tigre, the titular main character, is a 13 year-old boy torn between becoming a hero or villain. His full name is Manuel Pablo Gutierrez O'Brien Equihua Rivera.
- Grey DeLisle as Frida Suárez, Manny's troublemaking rockstar best friend and eventual girlfriend. She is the third daughter of police chief Emiliano Suárez and judge Carmela Suárez.
- Eric Bauza as Rodolfo Rivera / White Pantera, Manny's overprotective and heroic father who wields his Bronze Boots of Truth. He advises Manny to become a superhero.
- Carlos Alazraqui as Jorge "Grandpapi" Rivera / Puma Loco, Manny's villainous/anti-villainous grandfather who wields his Golden Sombrero of Chaos.
- April Stewart as María Rivera, Manny's loving mother and Rodolfo's ex-wife.

=== Antagonists ===
- Susan Silo as Sartana of the Dead, the skeletal guitarist and most feared villain of Miracle City. Her powers include immortality, regeneration, and the ability to inflict damage with her claws.
- Candi Milo as Zoe Aves / Black Cuervo, Frida's archenemy who holds a vendetta against her and has a crush on Manny.
- Richard Steven Horvitz as Diego Jr. / Dr. Chipotle Jr., an evil child prodigy who specializes in experimenting with guacamole.
- Jeff Bennett as Sergio / Señor Siniestro, an exchange student from Italy who pretends to be a robotic cowboy.
- John DiMaggio as El Oso, a bear-themed villain that usually robs from banks.
- Grey DeLisle as Carmelita Aves / Voltura, Zoe's mother who holds a grudge on Rodolfo for breaking up with her (which she claims that she broke up with him from that day).
- Carlos Alazraqui as Pachita "Grandmami" Aves / Lady Gobbler, Zoe's grandmother who holds a grudge on Grandpapi for leaving her at the altar on their wedding day with another woman named Dora (Rodolfo's mother).
- Richard Steven Horvitz as Diego Sr. / Dr. Chipotle Sr., the father of Dr. Chipotle Jr.
- Danny Cooksey as Django of the Dead, the grandson of Sartana.
- John DiMaggio as General Chapuza, the leader of the Calevera Zombies.
- Grey DeLisle as Che Chapuza, the grandson of General Chapuza.
- Clancy Brown as Monsterzuma, a monster who lived under the volcano of Miracle City.
- Jon Polito as Don Baffi, the mob boss of the Moustache Mafia.
- Jack Angel as Comrade Chaos, a Russia-themed villain.
- Carlos Alazraqui as El Tarántula, a spider-themed villain.
- Charlie Adler as Mano Negra, a villain whose head is attached to a robotic suit.
- Danny Trejo as El Mal Verde, a hulking giant who is capable of swallowing heroes whole.
- Renée Mújica as Titanium Titan, White Pantera's former partner who turns to a life of crime.

=== Recurring characters ===
- Daran Norris as Chief Emiliano Suárez, Frida's father who is the chief of police and doesn't trust Manny with her.
- Alanna Ubach as Sega, a student from Leone Middle School.
- Grey DeLisle as Carmela Suárez, Frida's mother who is the Miracle City judge.
- Grey DeLisle and April Stewart as Anita & Nikita Suárez, Frida's bossy two older sisters.
- Grey DeLisle as Aaron, a student from Leone Middle School.
- Carlos Alazraqui as Vice-Principal Chakal, the disciplinary vice-principal who always gives Manny and Frida detention.
- Carlos Alazraqui as Lupito, a student from Leone Middle School.
- Carlos Alazraqui as Humberto, a student from Leone Middle School.
- Eric Bauza as Chorizo, a student from Leone Middle School.
- Candi Milo as Guero, a student from Leone Middle School.
- Jessica DiCicco as Davi Rocco / Albino Burrito, Manny's biggest fan who wants to be his sidekick.
- John DiMaggio as Municipal President Rodríguez, the president of the Miracle City municipal council who is very arrogant and selfish.

== Production ==
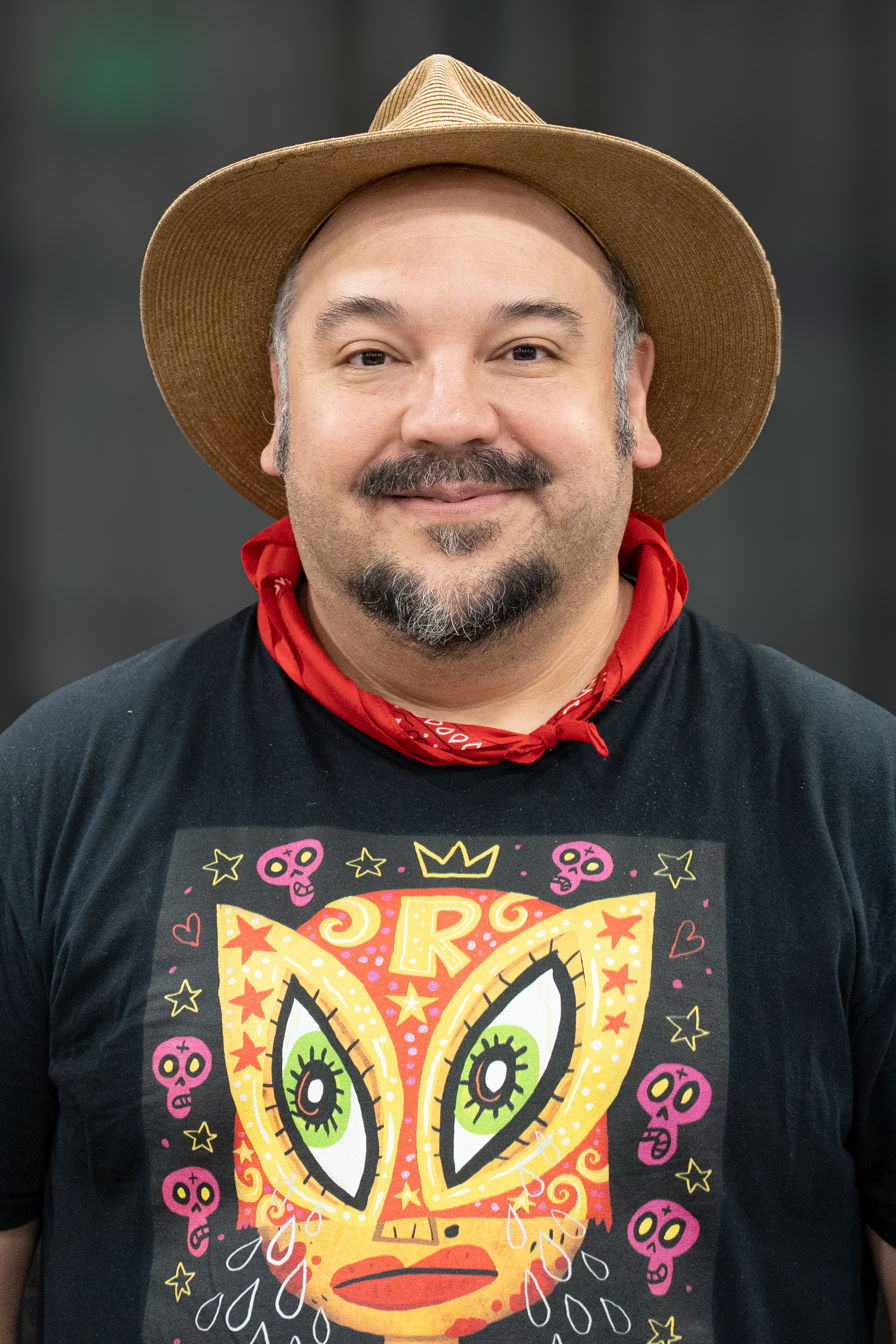
Jorge Gutiérrez at Comic Con Oakland 2026

El Tigre was created by a husband-and-wife team named Jorge Gutiérrez and Sandra Equihua along with others who were employed to make the show. The couple made the project from experiences they had when they were younger. Manny Rivera is based on Jorge's young self. Many things known in the show were based on actual events or parts of Jorge's life. His father was an architect (which was viewed as good) and his grandfather was a general in the military (which was viewed as evil). That idea was exaggerated to the idea of superheroes and supervillains. The city Miracle City is likely based on Tijuana, Baja California, where Jorge grew up and Sandra was born in.

This was the first Nicktoon to be fully animated in Adobe Flash after O'Grady, which was exclusive to The N. The animation of the series was a split between Boulder Media in Ireland and 6 Point Harness in the United States.

== El Tigre's Decision of Destiny ==
On January 25, 2008, Nickelodeon allowed viewers to vote on the ending of the episode "The Good, the Bad, and the Tigre", promoted as Decision of Destiny. The vote allowed viewers to decide whether El Tigre would choose the path of heroism or villainy. "The Good, the Bad, and the Tigre" premiered later that same day with the ending chosen by the voters. Voters ultimately chose the heroic ending, in which El Tigre defeated Django and Sartana. If the villainous ending had been chosen, he would have helped Django and Sartana conquer the world, but turned against them by launching them through space to take the empire for himself and Frida, and ruled over the world into old age. After they remembered to free the now-elderly White Pantera and Puma Loco from all their tyrannical fun, their reunion was interrupted when Sartana and Django recruited an army of aliens to retake her throne, in which the Rivera men (along with Frida who rides a mech) leap into action to battle Sartana, which cuts with the title "The End?".

== Episodes ==
=== Series overview ===
Season	Segments	Episodes	Originally released	
Season	Segments	Episodes	First released	Last released
1	50	26	March 3, 2007	September 13, 2008

No.	Title	Directed by	Written by	Storyboard by	Original release date	Prod. code
Nickelodeon
1a	"Sole of a Hero"	Dave Thomas	Scott Kreamer; Story by : Dave Thomas, Scott Kreamer, and Jorge R. Gutiérrez	Fred Gonzales	March 3, 2007	101a
While "borrowing" Rodolfo's supercharged Bronze Boots of Truth, Manny and Frida break them. Manny covers it up until Rodolfo slips into a depression after being beaten by El Oso.
1b	"Night of the Living Guacamole"	Dave Thomas	Doug Langdale; Story by : Jorge R. Gutierrez, Dave Thomas, and Bill Motz & Bob Roth	Fred Osmond	February 19, 2007	101b
Manny spends money on a laser tattoo maker instead of some expensive guacamole, so Manny gets some for free from a disguised Dr. Chipotle Jr. which turns Rodolfo and Grandpapi into guacamole zombies.
2a	"Enter the Cuervo"	Dave Thomas	Scott Kreamer	Ricky Garduno	March 3, 2007	102a
Manny spends his time with a new supervillainess named Black Cuervo, nearly ruining his friendship with Frida (and her fiesta) in the process.
2b	"Fistful of Collars"	Dave Thomas	Scott M. Gimple; Story by : Scott M. Gimple and Jorge R. Gutierrez	Luke Cormican	March 3, 2007	102b
While making some roller skates, Manny and Frida earn money for finding the town's lost pets so they can buy Luxe roller skates and scooters, then earn a bigger cash reward if they return a chihuahua named Taco to his rightful owner.
3a	"Fool's Goal"	Dave Thomas	Rob Humphrey & John Behnke and Doug Langdale; Story by: Scott Kreamer	Kevin Kaliher and Dave Thomas	March 10, 2007	104a
Grandpapi decides to coach Manny's soccer team, with extremely disastrous results.
3b	"El Tigre, El Jefe"	Dave Thomas	Scott M. Gimple; Story by : Scott M. Gimple and Jorge R. Gutierrez	Eddie Trigueros	March 10, 2007	104b
Manny helps his friends and classmates at Escuela get better grades, but when he gets carried away, Frida and classmates unknowingly consult a supervillain to go against him.
4a	"Zebra Donkey"	Dave Thomas	Scott M. Gimple; Story by : Dave Thomas	Brandon Kruse and Dave Thomas	March 17, 2007	103a
Manny cares for the town's mascot Zebra Donkey very much, but after accidentally killing him, Manny and Frida use Sartana of the Dead's Golden Guitar of Doom to resurrect him, unaware of the grave consequences.
4b	"Adios Amigos"	Dave Thomas	Scott Kreamer; Story by: Dave Thomas, Jorge R. Gutierrez, and Scott Kreamer	Ricky Garduno	March 17, 2007	103b
During a dangerous day at a carnival, Manny encounters the Titanium Titan, a former superhero with shapeshifting titanium arms. To keep Frida out of harm's way from the Titan, Manny must end his friendship with Frida.
5a	"The Mother of All Tigres"	Dave Thomas	Scott M. Gimple; Story by: Scott M. Gimple and Jorge R. Gutierrez	Eddie Trigueros	April 7, 2007	105a
When Manny's mother, María, comes to visit, Manny and his friends are afraid he'll be forced to live with her due to Miracle City's bad status and his parents' divorce. They then decided to show her that Miracle City isn't all that bad after all.
5b	"Old Money"	Dave Thomas	Scott M. Gimple; Story by: Scott M. Gimple and Jorge R. Gutierrez	Fred Gonzales	April 7, 2007	105b
Manny and Frida help a group of retired supervillains get their money back from Sartana of the Dead. However, just because they're retired, doesn't mean they are no longer supervillains.
6a	"The Late Manny Rivera"	Dave Thomas	Scott Kreamer; Story by: Jorge R. Gutierrez and Scott Kreamer	Luke Cormican	April 21, 2007	106a
Manny and Frida must be at the Escuela in time or they will be forced to go to separate schools.
6b	"Party Monsters"	Dave Thomas	Tracy Berna; Story by: Tracy Berna, Jorge R. Gutierrez, and Dave Thomas	Ben Jones	April 21, 2007	106b
Manny and Frida accidentally ruin a group of geeky kids' game night, but when the Mustache Mafia attack, they must work together to defeat them.
7a	"The Mustache Kid"	Dave Thomas	Scott Kreamer; Story by: Jorge R. Gutierrez and Scott Kreamer	Ricky Garduno	May 5, 2007	107a
Manny is tired of being a kid, so he enlists the help of Dr. Chipotle Jr. to give him a sentient mustache named Raúl in exchange for his El Tigre belt.
7b	"Puma Licito"	Dave Thomas	Scott Kreamer	Brandon Kruse	May 5, 2007	107b
When Manny overhears Rodolfo and María voicing their concern over Grandpapi being a bad influence on him, Manny and Frida use his suit to do very heroic things to prove he isn't a bad influence after all. However, Grandpapi might not be okay with this.
8a	"Miracle City Worker"	Dave Thomas and Gabe Swarr	Scott M. Gimple; Story by: Scott M. Gimple and Doug Langdale	Luke Cormican	May 12, 2007	108a
María tries to reform supervillains into becoming good citizens, but Manny isn't convinced they can change.
8b	"Día de los Malos"	Dave Thomas	Tracy Berna; Story by : Tracy Berna and Dave Thomas	Luke Cormican	May 12, 2007	108b
Manny is rejected as a hero by other superheroes while attending a superhero convention. But when Sartana of the Dead and other supervillains run amok and trap the heroes at the convention, it is up to Manny to prove them wrong and save the day.
9a	"Yellow Pantera"	Dave Thomas	Scott Kreamer; Story by: Jorge R. Gutierrez and Scott Kreamer	Eddie Trigueros	June 16, 2007	109a
Upon learning Rodolfo retreated from a fight with El Mal Verde, Manny is very disappointed to hear that his father acted cowardly and tries to face El Mal Verde himself.
9b	"Rising Son"	Dave Thomas	Tracy Berna; Story by : Jorge R. Gutierrez and Tracy Berna	Fred Gonzales	June 16, 2007	109b
When the Seventh Samurai visits the Rivera household, Manny and Frida take his son, Toshiro, around Miracle City for him to become a real independent superhero.
10a	"The Curse of the Albino Burrito"	Dave Thomas	Tracy Berna; Story by : Jorge R. Gutierrez and Tracy Berna	Dave Knott and Dave Thomas	September 21, 2007	110a
When an aspiring superhero kid named Davi asks Manny to help him become a hero, Manny and Frida trick him into doing their chores. But when Manny and his family are in danger, it's up to Davi to be a hero and save them.
10b	"La Tigresa"	Dave Thomas	Scott Gimple; Story by : Scott Gimple and Jorge Gutierrez	Fred Gonzales	September 21, 2007	110b
Tired of being powerless, Frida "borrows" Manny's belt and becomes the superheroine "La Tigresa".
11a	"Ballad of Frida Suárez"	Dave Thomas	Scott M. Gimple; Story by: Jorge R. Gutierrez and Scott M. Gimple	Dave Knott, Luke Cormican, Gabe Swarr, Eddie Trigueros, and Dave Thomas	September 28, 2007	113a
After El Tigre suffers a humiliating defeat against Sartana of the Dead, Frida writes a hit song about it. However, she soon lets the fame go to her head.
11b	"Fool Speed Ahead"	Dave Thomas	Scott Kreamer; Story by: Jorge R. Gutierrez and Scott Kreamer	Brandon Kruse	September 28, 2007	113b
Grandpapi and Manny must win the Supervillain Grand Prix or the Riveras will be forced to leave Miracle City forever.
12a	"Miracle City Undercover"	Dave Thomas	Scott Kreamer; Story by: Jorge R. Gutierrez and Scott Kreamer	Eddie Trigueros	October 5, 2007	112a
When Raúl the Mustache is framed for a crime, Manny must go undercover with the Mustache Mafia to prove Raúl's innocence.
12b	"Bride of Puma Loco"	Dave Thomas	Scott Kreamer; Story by: Jorge R. Gutierrez and Scott Kreamer	Sean Szeles and Brandon Kruse	October 5, 2007	112b
When Grandpapi and Sartana of the Dead unexpectedly announce their engagement, Manny and Frida do everything they can to keep the wedding from happening.
13a	"Eye Caramba"	Dave Thomas	Tracy Berna; Story by : Scott Gimple and Jorge R. Gutierrez	Ricky Garduno	October 12, 2007	111a
After winning Lady Gobbler's glass eye, Manny gives the glass eye to Rodolfo, both unaware the eye is actually a surveillance camera, with the Flock of Fury watching White Pantera's every move.
13b	"Clash of the Titan"	Dave Thomas	Scott Gimple; Story by : Scott Gimple and Jorge Gutierrez	Ricky Garduno	October 12, 2007	111b
When The Titanium Titan returns and claims he has become good again, he joins forces with White Pantera and El Tigre to fight crime. However, Manny and his father discover the Titan has not really changed his ways.
14	"The Grave Escape"	Dave Thomas	Scott Kreamer and Doug Langdale; Story by: Jorge R. Gutierrez and Scott Kreamer	Ricky Garduno and Eddie Trigueros	October 19, 2007	114
In this two-part episode, Sartana of the Dead attacks the Riveras during Dia de los Muertos, which sends Manny and Frida to the Land of the Dead. There, Manny must enlist the help of his ancestors to return to the living world and save his family before he and Frida become forever trapped as skeletons in the Land of the Dead.
15a	"Burrito's Little Helper"	Dave Thomas	Tracy Berna; Story by : Scott Kreamer	Fred Gonzales	November 2, 2007	115a
Manny is forced to become Davi's sidekick after Davi gets him out of trouble.
15b	"Crouching Tigre, Hidden Dragon"	Dave Thomas	Brandon Sawyer; Story by: Jorge R. Gutierrez and Scott Kreamer	Luke Cormican	November 2, 2007	115b
When a superhero trio asks Manny due to his street smarts, Rodolfo tries to impress them by being street smart as well.
16a	"The Cactus Kid"	Dave Thomas	Brandon Sawyer; Story by: Scott Kreamer and Jorge R. Gutierrez	Brandon Kruse	November 9, 2007	116a
Grandpapi feels Manny isn't becoming the supervillain he wants him to be so he uses an aspiring supervillain named "The Cactus Kid" just to make Manny feel jealous.
16b	"A Mother's Glove"	Dave Thomas	Scott Kreamer; Story by: Brandon Sawyer and Jorge R. Gutierrez	Sean Szeles	November 9, 2007	116b
Manny discovers his mother, María, used to be a superheroine known as "Plata Peligrosa" before she quit. But when Manny tricks María into becoming Plata Peligrosa, he'll discover why she quit being a superhero in the first place.
17	"The Good, the Bad, and the Tigre"	Dave Thomas	Scott Kreamer; Story by: Jorge R. Gutierrez and Scott Kreamer	Luke Cormican and Fred Gonzales	January 25, 2008	118
In the second two-part episode of the series, Manny is tired of being treated as a child by everyone. But when Sartana of the Dead announces her retirement, Manny attempts to prove himself by entering Sartana's competition to find her successor, while slowly going into the supervillain side.
18a	"A Fistful of Nickels"	Dave Thomas	Thomas Hart and Doug Langdale; Story by: Jorge R. Gutierrez and Thomas Hart	Dave Thomas	2005 (original pilot version)	119a
18a	"A Fistful of Nickels"	Dave Thomas	Thomas Hart and Doug Langdale; Story by: Jorge R. Gutierrez and Thomas Hart	Dave Thomas	June 16, 2008 (remake)	119a
After accidentally destroying the Rivera house and killing the family parrot, Manny tries to repay the damages by stealing money from supervillains.
18b	"Animales!"	Dave Thomas	Story by : Sean Szeles, Scott Kreamer, Dave Thomas, Gabe Swarr, and Jorge Gutierrez	Sean Szeles	June 16, 2008	119b
The family pets, Little Mule and Señor Chapi, attempt to retrieve a stolen item from the pets across the street.
19a	"Tigre + Cuervo Forever"	Dave Thomas	Tracy Berna; Story by : Jorge R. Gutierrez	Ricky Garduno	June 17, 2008	120a
Manny begins to date Black Cuervo to retrieve information of the Flock of Fury's crimes to tip off his dad so he could stop them, but he soon learns why he shouldn't take advantage of a girl's feelings.
19b	"The Thing That Ate Frida's Brain"	Dave Thomas	Brandon Sawyer; Story by: Brandon Sawyer and Jorge R. Gutierrez	Eddie Trigueros	June 17, 2008	120b
After Frida slowly starts to turn into a zombie hungry for brains, Manny must find a way to cure her before she turns into a complete zombie.
20a	"Stinking Badges!"	Gabe Swarr	Scott Kreamer; Story by: Jorge R. Gutierrez and Scott Kreamer	Luke Cormican	June 18, 2008	121a
To win her father's respect, Frida begins to take the credit for all the crimes El Tigre stops. However, her two older sisters soon see through her scheme.
20b	"Mech Daddy"	Dave Thomas	Tracy Berna; Story by : Jorge Gutierrez and Doug Langdale	Fred Gonzales	June 18, 2008	121b
Manny and Frida take control of a mecha supervillain named Giant Robot Sánchez.
21a	"The Return of Plata Peligrosa"	Gabe Swarr	Scott Kreamer; Story by : Dave Thomas and Scott Kreamer	Gabe Swarr, Katie Rice, Fred Osmond, and Dave Feiss	June 19, 2008	122a
Rodolfo begins to fall for María after she becomes Plata Peligrosa again. It's up to Manny and Frida to convince Rodolfo María isn't herself when she's a superheroine.
21b	"Chupacabros!"	Dave Thomas	Eddie Guzelian; Story by: Jorge R. Gutierrez and Scott Kreamer	Sean Szeles	June 19, 2008	122b
After finding a chupacabra, Manny decides to keep it as a pet and name it "Chui". But when the local goats go missing, Manny learns Chui eats goats and must release him into the wild to keep him from eating more and more.
22a	"Love and War"	Dave Thomas	Tracy Berna; Story by : Jorge Gutierrez and Tracy Berna	Eddie Trigueros	June 20, 2008	117a
When Dr. Chipotle Jr. and Señor Siniestro fall in love with Frida, they fight to win her affection. But when they realize she prefers to be with Manny, they come up with a plot to eliminate him.
22b	"Wrong and Dance"	Dave Thomas	Brandon Sawyer; Story by: Jorge R. Gutierrez and Scott Kreamer	Ricky Garduno	June 20, 2008	117b
Manny enlists the help of Grandpapi to attract a group of mean girls to go to the school dance with him.
Nicktoons
23a	"Oso Solo Mío"	Gabe Swarr	Brandon Sawyer; Story by: Jorge R. Gutierrez and Scott Kreamer	Ricky Garduno	August 7, 2008	123a
Manny and Frida try to help supervillain El Oso win the heart of his true love.
23b	"Silver Wolf"	Dave Thomas	Tracy Berna; Story by : Eddie Trigueros and Jorge R. Gutierrez	Eddie Trigueros	August 7, 2008	123b
Manny and Frida's friendship deteriorates after Frida abandons Manny to spend more time with a popular teen supervillain named Silver Wolf.
24a	"The Cuervo Project"	Dave Thomas	Henry Gilroy; Story by : Jorge R. Gutierrez	Fred Gonzales	August 8, 2008	124a
Frida's nemesis, Zoe Aves, is grouped with Manny and Frida for a science fair project. But when Frida starts to suspect Zoe might be Black Cuervo, she and Manny try to prove it.
24b	"The Golden Eagle Twins"	Gabe Swarr	Scott Kreamer; Story by: Jorge R. Gutierrez and Scott Kreamer	Luke Cormican and Ricky Garduno	August 8, 2008	124b
Manny and Frida start to hang out with beloved local heroes, the Golden Eagle Twins, to learn how to be heroes like them. However, they soon realize the Golden Eagle Twins may not be as noble as they seem.
25a	"Dia de los Padres"	Gabe Swarr	Henry Gilroy; Story by: Jorge Gutierrez and Scott Kreamer	Luke Cormican	September 13, 2008	125a
Manny teams up with Dr. Chipotle Jr. to give their fathers a gift for Father's Day. However, Dr. Chipotle Jr. may not be completely trusted.
25b	"Mustache Love"	Dave Thomas	Scott Kreamer; Story by: Jorge R. Gutierrez and Scott Kreamer	Sean Szeles	September 13, 2008	125b
To help Raúl the Mustache win the heart of his date, Manny agrees to go on a date with a not-so-attractive girl named Sophia.
26a	"Back to Escuela"	Dave Thomas	Scott Kreamer; Story by : Jorge Gutierrez and Scott Kreamer	Eddie Trigueros	September 13, 2008	126a
To steal an artifact on display at Manny's school, Grandpapi decides to attend school with him.
26b	"No Boots, No Belt, No Brero"	Gabe Swarr	Doug Langdale; Story by : Jorge R. Gutierrez, Sandra Equihua, and Scott Kreamer	Ricky Garduno	September 13, 2008	126b
The Riveras' reckless actions due to family tension causes them to be stripped from their powers and attend family counseling. They soon learn to put their differences aside and work together as a family to save Miracle City.

== Broadcast ==
El Tigre: The Adventures of Manny Rivera had its first screening on January 19, 2007, at the first-ever Nickelodeon Creative Summit held in San Juan, Puerto Rico as a special treat for the 60 exclusive attendees. Later sneak peeks of the series premiered on February 19, 2007. The series then premiered regularly on March 3, 2007, and it has aired for both networks. Each half-hour episode consists of two 11-minute segments, with the two exceptions being "The Grave Escape" and "The Good, The Bad, and the Tigre", which are double-length episodes. The series had its Canadian debut on YTV on May 4, 2007.

Nickelodeon would continue to air the series up until June 20, 2008, shortly after an airing of the episodes "Love and War" and "Wrong and Dance". The show would later move to Nicktoons starting on August 7, 2008, with the episodes "Oso Solo Mio" and "Silver Wolf". The series finished its original run on September 13, 2008, after a total of 26 episodes. Since the series' cancellation, reruns continued to air on Nicktoons until February 10, 2018, before making a surprise comeback on May 5, 2021, to celebrate Cinco de Mayo. Four episodes of the series were aired on TeenNick's NickRewind block for a very short time from March 20 to April 17, 2021.

The series is currently available to purchase on iTunes and Amazon Prime Video digitally. It was also available on the PlayStation Network Store. A few clips of the series were available for viewing on the Nickelodeon website. Since July 26, 2023, the entire series was added to Paramount+.

== Merchandise ==
=== Video games ===
A video game based on the series, also titled El Tigre: The Adventures of Manny Rivera, was released for the Nintendo DS and PlayStation 2 in 2007. The series also had several web browser-based games on Nickelodeon's official website, including a fighting game that could be downloaded through the Nick Arcade website, titled Festival De Las Piñatas. El Tigre was also a playable character in several Nickelodeon-crossover browser games, including Nick Arcade's Nicktoons HoverZone.

El Tigre is a playable character in the Nintendo DS version of Nicktoons: Attack of the Toybots, and he also makes a non-playable cameo appearance in Nicktoons MLB. El Tigre appears as a playable character in Nickelodeon All-Star Brawl 2, along with a stage based on the Miracle City volcano arena.

=== Toys ===
McDonald's Happy Meal featured El Tigre toys for a limited time in January 2008. They include the characters El Tigre, White Pantera, Puma Loco, and Señor Sinestro.

=== Home media ===
The second segment of the first episode titled "Night of the Living Guacamole" was to be featured on the Nick Picks Vol. 6 DVD, with a release date for August 7, 2007. However, the DVD was cancelled for unknown reasons. The episode "The Grave Escape" was included on a downloadable digital DVD available on iTunes called Nickelodeon Shocktober! Vol. 1, along with select episodes of Zoey 101, The Naked Brothers Band, and iCarly. The complete series DVD was released as Season 1 on a six-disc set on November 23, 2011, as a manufacture on demand Amazon exclusive. An international version of the Season 1 DVD, titled Día De Los Malos (or O Día Dos Maus in Brazil), was released on the same day. Unlike the season 1 manufacture on demand DVD, this one was sold in Mexico and Brazil. However, not all episodes from Season 1 were released in this DVD.

Title	Episode count	Release date	Episodes
Nick Picks Vol. 6	1	—N/a	"Night of the Living Guacamole"

=== Print media ===
Nickelodeon featured comics for El Tigre: The Adventures of Manny Rivera in Nickelodeon Magazine. Its first-ever comic, "Puma's Paw", was featured in the March 2007 issue.

An art book titled "The Art of El Tigre: The Adventures of Manny Rivera" was released on July 9, 2024.

== Possible revival ==
In 2018, series creator Jorge R. Gutiérrez pitched an El Tigre movie to Netflix. Nickelodeon reportedly supported the project; however, Netflix Animation wanted him to focus on Maya and the Three and a canceled project, Kung-Fu Space Punch.

In May 2026, Gutierrez revealed that he was in talks with Paramount about a potential revival of the show for Paramount+ and expressed interest in having it be a crossover with My Life as a Teenage Robot and Invader Zim.

== Other appearances ==
The characters Manny, Frida, and Grandpapi/Puma Loco make an appearance during a 2D animated scene in The Book of Life which is Jorge R. Gutierrez' first feature-length film. A wallpaper with El Tigre's design can be seen in a later scene as well as White Pantera in another scene.

El Oso (renamed as Bear Killah) appeared as a recurring character in Maya and the Three (also created by Jorge R. Gutierrez).

== Reception ==
=== Critical ===
Emily Ashby of Common Sense Media gave the series three out of five stars; saying that, "Tweens will enjoy the zany characters and exaggerated stories, but parents might take issue with the young characters' penchant for troublemaking, the absence of a strong role model for Manny, and the overall lack of repercussions for his questionable behavior." The first season received an approval rating of 100% on review aggregator Rotten Tomatoes, based on six reviews.

Amid Amidi of Cartoon Brew wrote that "El Tigre offers hands down the most dynamic implementation of Flash I've ever seen in an animated TV series, seamlessly combining the cinematic possibilities more commonly associated with 3D CGI alongside the organic appeal of drawn animation," while also stating that the series has an "annoying tendency to stage too many scenes on slants and diagonals, voice acting performances that I couldn't understand."

=== Awards and nominations ===
Award	Category	Nominee	Result
35th Annie Awards	Best Animated Television Production for Children	El Tigre	Won
35th Annie Awards	Character Animation in a Television Production	Monica Kennedy – El Tigre	Nominated
35th Annie Awards	Character Design in an Animated Television Production	Jorge R. Gutierrez – El Tigre "Fistful of Collars"	Won
35th Annie Awards	Music in an Animated Television Production	Shawn Patterson – El Tigre "Yellow Pantera"	Nominated
36th Annie Awards	Writing in an Animated Television Production or Short Form	Scott Kreamer – El Tigre "Mustache Love" – Nickelodeon	Nominated
36th Annie Awards	Character Design in an Animated Television Production or Short Form	Jorge Gutierrez – El Tigre "The Good, The Bad and The Tigre"	Nominated
35th Daytime Emmy Awards	Outstanding Individual Achievement in Animation	Sandra Equihua, Character Designer	Won
36th Daytime Emmy Awards
36th Daytime Emmy Awards	Outstanding Individual Achievement in Animation	Jorge Gutierrez, Character Designer	Won
36th Daytime Emmy Awards	Outstanding Individual Achievement in Animation	Gerald de Jesus, Art Direction	Won
36th Daytime Emmy Awards	Outstanding Individual Achievement in Animation	Eddie Trigueros, Storyboard	Won
36th Daytime Emmy Awards	Outstanding Directing in an Animated Program	Dave Thomas, Gabe Swarr & Andrea Romano	Won
