= Annie Awards for Special Achievement in Animation =

Award related to work in the animation field

This is the list of recipients for the Annie Award for Special Achievement in Animation, given by the Board of Directors of ASIFA-Hollywood for "unique and outstanding achievement in animation not recognized in other Annie Award categories."

== Honorees ==
=== 2020s ===
2025: The annual LightBox Expo event

2024: The book The Original Directors of Walt's Animated Films, Pete Docter and Don Peri

2023: The Artists of Walt Disney Animation

2021: Glenn Vilppu

2020: Howard

=== 2010s ===
2017: Cuphead

2016: Life, Animated

2014: The Walt Disney Family Museum

2013: Creative Talent Network (CTN) Animation eXpo

2011: Depth Analysis

=== 2000s ===
2009: Martin Meunier and Brian McLean

2007: Edwin R. Leonard – Promoting the use of Linux in animation studios and video game development

2000: Bob Clampett's Beany and Cecil The Special Edition, Robert Clampett Jr.

== See also ==
- Winsor McCay Award
