= Jorge R. Gutiérrez =

Mexican animator (born 1975)

Jorge R. Gutierrez
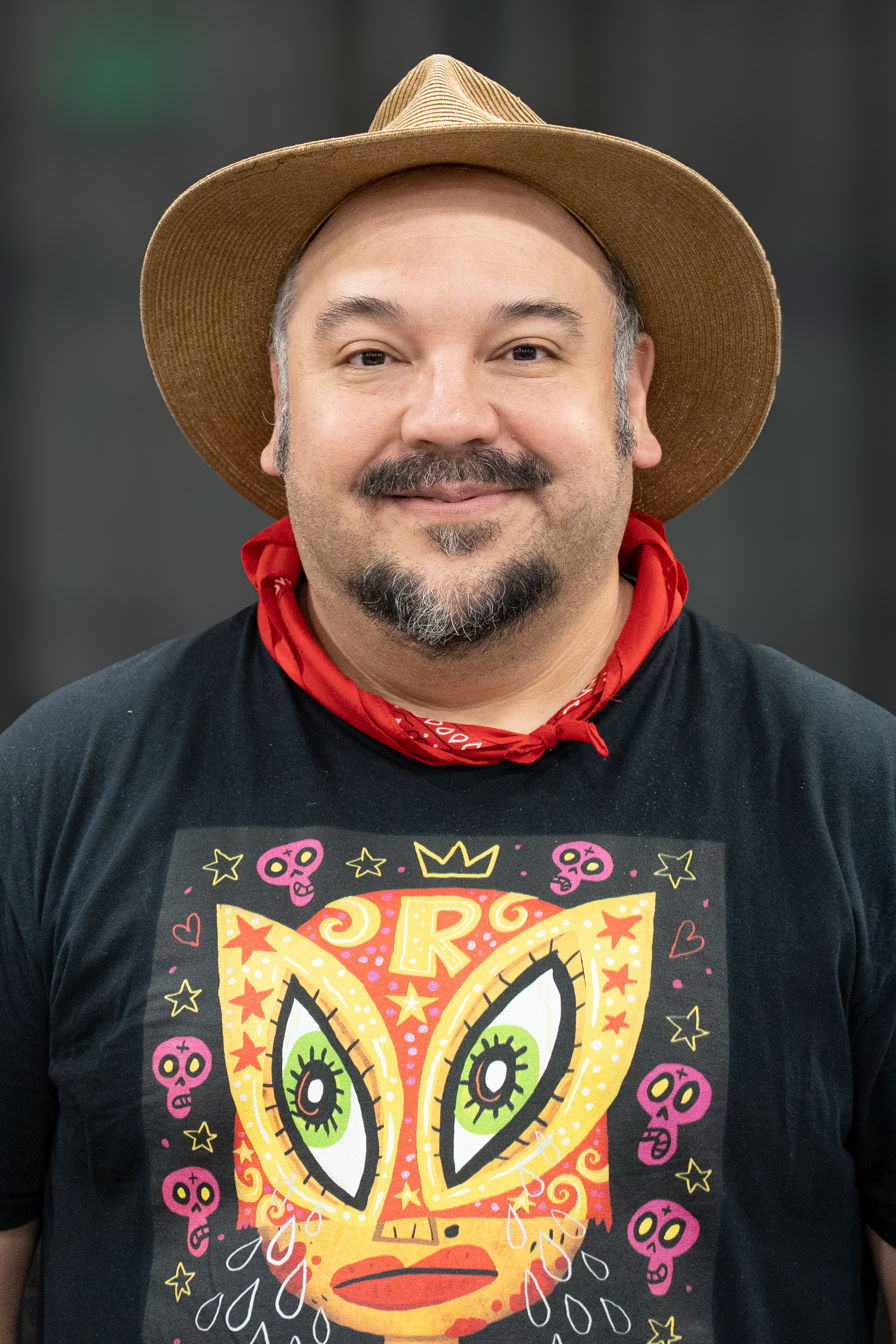
- Gutiérrez in 2026
- Born: January 25, 1975 (age 51); Mexico City, Mexico
- Education: California Institute of the Arts (BFA, MFA)
- Occupations: Animator; filmmaker; voice actor
- Years active: 1998–present
- Known for: El Tigre: The Adventures of Manny Rivera; The Book of Life; Maya and the Three
- Spouse: Sandra Equihua (m. 2001)
- Children: 1
- Website: www.super-macho.com

Jorge R. Gutiérrez (born January 25, 1975), also known as "Super Macho", is a Mexican animator, filmmaker, and voice actor. He co-created the Nickelodeon animated series El Tigre: The Adventures of Manny Rivera with his wife Sandra Equihua, and co-wrote and directed the film The Book of Life and the television miniseries Maya and the Three. He and Equihua founded the production studio Mexopolis in 1994.

== Biography ==
Jorge R. Gutiérrez was born on January 25, 1975 in Mexico City and raised in Tijuana. As a child, he adopted the nickname "Super Macho" after his grandfather told him "there are two types of Mexicans: Macho and Super Macho".

Gutiérrez attended the California Institute of the Arts (CalArts), where he received his BFA (1997) & MFA (2000) in Experimental Animation under Jules Engel, and was mentored by Maureen Selwood. There he created the 3D short Carmelo, which won the 2001 Student Emmy Award in animation and was screened at Kodak's Emerging Filmmakers Program at the 2001 Cannes Film Festival. In 2000, Gutiérrez worked under animator Maurice Noble, for the art direction of Chuck Jones' Timberwolf for Warner Bros. In 2001, he began creating Jorge Gutiérrez's El Macho, an animated web series for Sony Pictures.

Gutiérrez has also done character design on many animated series including Nickelodeon's ChalkZone, as well as Kids' WB's ¡Mucha Lucha!, Cartoon Network's Class of 3000, and Disney's The Buzz on Maggie for which he was nominated for a 2006 Annie Award in character design. As a writer, he's worked on Scholastic's Maya & Miguel as well as Disney's Brandy & Mr. Whiskers and Vampirina.

In 2008, Gutiérrez won two Annie awards (Best TV Animated Show & Best TV Character Design) and one Emmy (Best TV Character Design) working on his passion project for Nickelodeon, El Tigre: The Adventures of Manny Rivera, along with his co-creator and wife, Sandra Equihua who also won an Emmy for her character designs.

In 2010, he created some of the sketches in Cartoon Network's Mad including "Dear Reaper...", "Dog vs Mailman" (part 1, 2 and 3), "Video Game Cheats", "Arcade Boy" and "Dog vs Fire Hydrant".

In 2012, Gutiérrez directed and co-wrote an animated adventure feature film with a Romeo and Juliet style love story set against a Mexican "Day of the Dead" backdrop. The film, with the official title The Book of Life, was co-produced with 20th Century Fox Animation and was released on October 17, 2014. He earned his first Golden Globe Award nomination for Best Animated Feature Film in 2014. He was also nominated for three Annie awards (Best Film, Best Director & Best Character Design).

In February 2015, Reel FX and Gutiérrez announced a multi-year, multi-picture deal which included Kung Fu Space Punch and The Book of Life 2.

In 2016 Gutiérrez designed, voiced, wrote and directed the Annie and Emmy nominated Son of Jaguar VR short for Google Spotlight Stories.

In 2016, Gutiérrez was awarded an Impact Award by the National Hispanic Media Coalition for his "Outstanding Direction in a Motion Picture".

On August 2, 2017, it was reported that Gutierrez would write and direct The Billion Brick Race, a spin-off of The Lego Movie, for Warner Animation Group. However, on February 8, 2018, it was reported that Gutiérrez had permanently cancelled the project.

In October 2020, he signed an over-all-deal with Netflix. He directed the Immigration music video for the Emmy Award-winning series We the People, and wrote and directed the Annie (Best TV Animated Show & Best TV Music) and Emmy (Best Writing, Best Promo, Best Sound and Individual Achievement for Color) Award-winning Maya and the Three, a nine episode animated limited series for Netflix Animation. He had been developing a follow-up series to Maya set in the same universe for Netflix titled Kung Fu Space Punch, however, it was scrapped in 2022 along with many other planned animated series. He was also set to direct an original animated film titled I, Chihuahua from a script he wrote with Gabriel Iglesias. However, Netflix cancelled the film in April 2024 due to creative differences. In February 2026, it was announced that the film got revived by United Kingdom studio Snafu Pictures. In May 2026, it was announced that the film distribution rights would be shopped to different studios during the Marché du Film 2026.

In December 2024 and February 2025, Gutiérrez hinted that he and Equihua had meetings with The Walt Disney Company on a potential new project. In April 2026, Gutiérrez confirmed that he was developing a new animated project for Disney hinting that it is "based on an IP they own".

On June 20, 2025, it was announced that Gutiérrez was developing an original animated independent short film La Venganza Rodríguez at Spanish animation studio Hampa Studio.

On July 4, 2025, Gutiérrez announced El Guapo vs. the Narco Vampires, an adult animated pilot in collaboration with Ánima Estudios that would be shopped to streamers and studios. The pilot debuted in January 2026.

In December 2025, Gutiérrez teased that he was developing a Speedy Gonzales feature film at Warner Bros. Pictures Animation. The project was greenlit at Warner Bros. Pictures Animation on January 16, 2026.

In May 2026, Prime Video announced the production of Gutiérrez's animated project Punky Duck as a part of the GenAI Creators' Fund, an Amazon MGM Studios initiative for integrating artificial intelligence to professional animation pipelines including the use of generative AI tools. In a statement to Cartoon Brew, Gutiérrez said that he would be cautious with artificial intelligence, saying, "artists driving tech, and not the other way around, is my goal." The announcement was met with backlash from his fans on social media, with many calling him a sell out after his long career in the animation industry and his history of supporting artists' rights. Gutiérrez backed out of the project days after the announcement, saying on X: "My sincerest apology to those I upset. I promise to do better moving forward."

== Personal life ==
Gutiérrez did not speak until the age of five. As an adult, he was diagnosed with autism following his son's diagnosis.

== Filmography ==
=== Short film ===
Year	Title	Director	Writer	Voice actor	Role	Notes
2000	Carmelo	Yes	Yes	Yes	Carmelo's Father	Won Student Emmy
2017	Son of Jaguar	Yes	Yes	Yes	Son of Jaguar	VR short Also character designer and art director

Storyboard artist

- Lint People (2001)

=== Feature film ===
Year	Title	Director	Writer	Notes
2014	The Book of Life	Yes	Yes	Also character designer and additional music composer
2015	Guardians of Oz	No	Yes	Also executive producer and character designer
—N/a	Untitled Speedy Gonzales fim	Yes	TBA	
—N/a	La Venganza Rodríguez	Yes	Yes	
—N/a	I, Chihuahua	Yes	Yes	

Voice roles

Year	Title	Role
2014	The Book of Life	Skeleton Carmelo
2023	Spider-Man: Across the Spider-Verse	Additional Voices
2024	The Casagrandes Movie	Felipe the Street Vendor
2025	The Bad Guys 2	Lucha spectator
2025	Aztec Batman: Clash of Empires	Toltecatzin
—N/a	Untitled Speedy Gonzales film	TBA

=== Television ===
Year	Title	Director	Writer	Creator	Executive producer	Notes
2001	El Macho	Yes	Yes	No	No	Web series Also character designer
2004–07	Maya & Miguel	No	Yes	No	No	8 episodes
2006	Brandy & Mr. Whiskers	No	Yes	No	No	Episode "Big Girls Don't Body Slam"
2007–08	El Tigre: The Adventures of Manny Rivera	No	Yes	Yes	Yes	Character designer, production designer
2010–13	Mad	Yes	Yes	No	No	Various skits; Animator
2021	We the People	Yes	No	No	No	Episode "Immigration"
2021	Maya and the Three	Yes	Yes	Yes	Yes	Miniseries

TV pilot

Year	Title	Director	Writer	Creator	Character designer	Voice actor	Role
2005	Pepe the Bull	Yes	Yes	Yes	Yes	No	—N/a
2010	Carmen Got Expelled	Yes	Yes	Yes	Yes	Yes	Butcher
2026	El Guapo vs. The Narco Vampires	Yes	Yes	Yes	Yes	Yes	El Guapo/Judas

Guest works

Year	Title	Role
2003	ChalkZone	Art director for "Pumpkin Love/Chip of Fools/Irresistible/Please Let Me In"
2007	Class of 3000	Music video art director for "Love is in the Hair...Net"
2024	The Simpsons	Director/writer/designer for the opening and credits of "Treehouse of Horror XXXV"

Voice roles

Year	Title	Role	Notes
2001	El Macho	El Macho	
2007–08	El Tigre: The Adventures of Manny Rivera	Gordo Gordo	
2018	Rise of the Teenage Mutant Ninja Turtles	Ghostbear	4 episodes
2019–22	Victor and Valentino	Sal	Recurring role
2019	The Loud House	Lucha Libre Commentator	Episode "Lucha Fever with the Casagrandes"
2021	Animaniacs	Diego Rivera	Segment "The Warners Are Present"
2021	Maya and the Three	King Teca	
2021	The Casagrandes	Lucha Libre Commentator / Pigeon Referee	Episode "Saving Face"
2024	Star Trek: Prodigy	Dr. K'ruvang	Episode "A Tribble Called Quest"
2024	Helluva Shorts	The Farmer	Episode "Mission: Chupacabras"
2025	Big City Greens	Customer	Episode Mulligan'd

Other credits

Year	Title	Role
2004	¡Mucha Lucha!	Character designer for Season 2 and 3
2005	The Buzz on Maggie	Character model design supervisor
2015–16	The Adventures of Puss in Boots	Executive consultant
—N/a	Kung-Fu Space Punch	Canceled

== Bibliography ==
Year	Title	Publisher	ISBN	Notes	Ref
2014	The Art of The Book of Life	Dark Horse Books	ISBN 978-1616555337	Author & illustrator	
2018	Día de los Muertos	Little Simon	ISBN 978-1534415157	Illustrator	
2018	Border Bang	Cernunnos	ISBN 978-2374950419	Author and illustrator	
