= Maureen Selwood =

Irish-born American filmmaker and visual artist

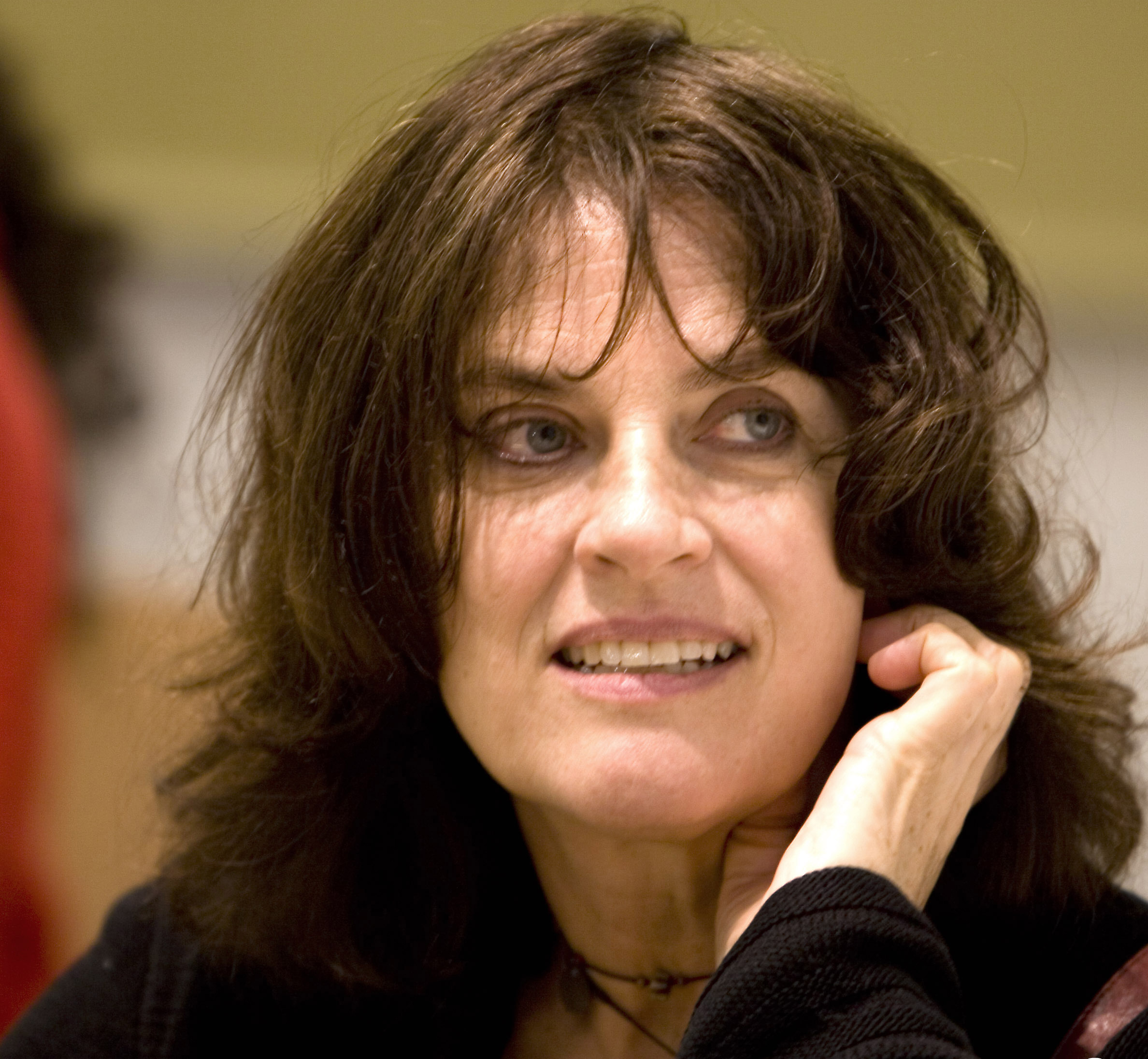
- Selwood at 2021 Academy of Motion Picture Arts and Sciences
- Born: 1946 (age 79–80); Dublin, Ireland
- Education: Corcoran Gallery of Art, College of New Rochelle, New York University Tisch School of the Arts

Maureen Selwood (born 1946) is an Irish-born American filmmaker and visual artist whose works employ simple line drawings, marriages between animation and live footage, digital projections and installations. She is a pioneer in the field of independent and experimental animation. She has received numerous awards, including a Guggenheim Fellowship (1992), and is the first animation artist to be awarded the Rome Prize (2002) in Visual Arts from the American Academy in Rome.

== Early life and education ==
Maureen Selwood was born in 1946 in Dublin, Ireland; to an Irish mother, Helene Neylon and a British father, John Leslie Selwood. She has a fraternal twin sister, Helen. Selwood's mother, the youngest of twelve, went to England along with many of her sisters to help with the war effort during WWII. Shortly after arriving in London Selwood's mother met John Leslie, whom she married a few months later. John first went to America in 1941 with the British Air Ministry to work in the administration with the Lend Lease program. When the war was over his wife and children emigrated to the United States.

The family eventually settled in Washington D.C., where Selwood took art classes at the Corcoran Gallery of Art. As a high school student during John F. Kennedy's presidency, Selwood was invited to work with Eunice Shriver in her efforts to study models of mentorship through Camp Shriver for the founding of the Special Olympics in 1962 and 1963. As a young undergraduate at College of New Rochelle, Selwood worked as a volunteer for Daniel Berrigan in New York City, tutoring in Harlem.

Selwood started working in film in 1968, when she enrolled in New York University Tisch School of the Arts. After graduating with her MFA degree from NYU on a full scholarship, Selwood joined the independent animation community that was forming in New York City in the 1970s.

== Career ==
During the years Selwood lived in New York City during the 1970s and 1980s she produced the independent animation films Odalisque, The Rug, This Is Just To Say and Pearls. Selwood is considered an integral part of the movement which evolved animation as a personal art form.

In 1991, after Selwood moved to Los Angeles, Jules Engel, founder of the Experimental Animation Program at CalArts, invited Selwood to join the faculty. She went on to produce the films: Flying Circus: An Imagined Memoir; Hail Mary; Mistaken Identity; Drawing Lessons and A Modern Convenience. Flying Circus premiered at the Venice Film Festival: La Biennale di Venezia and is inspired by Parade, the 1917 ballet by Picasso, Satie and Cocteau. Selwood plays with a childhood memory and uses animation to illustrate episodes of shifting tensions inside a circus tent.

In 1987, Selwood designed and directed animations for David Grubin Productions:The Colors of Hope, a documentary for Amnesty International about political prisoners in Argentina and I Started Early, based on the poetry of Emily Dickinson, for PBS's Poetry Everywhere (2007). In 2002, Selwood was the first animation artist to receive a Rome Prize Fellowship. As a Visual Arts Fellow at the American Academy of Rome, she created the installation, As The Veil Lifts, that went on to be exhibited at Frac Picardie in France alongside William Kentridge and Tabiamo. While in Rome Selwood collaborated with the poet James Galvin, who wrote the introduction for the book, Green Is For Privacy, a posthumous collaboration with her mother using her mother's drawings and writing about growing up with her mother's schizophrenia.

As You Desire Me (2009) is a film and installation in response to the Iraq War. It uses surrealistic designed characters in real settings in the city of Rome and opened at the Los Angeles Municipal Art Gallery at Barnsdall in Los Angeles. It was included in the Sharjah Biennial in the United Arab Emirates in 2013.

Selwood has created digital projections in collaboration with Sardono Dance Theater and Jennifer Tipton for Rain Coloring Forest at REDCAT (2010) and for the Metropolitan Opera's production of the opera Werther, by Jules Massenet, with Wendall K. Harrington (2014). In 2015, Selwood's collaboration with the composer, David Rosenboom, How Much Better if Plymouth Rock Had Landed on the Pilgrims, (Section VII, Impression), screened at the Whitney Museum at its new location in downtown New York. The role of the composer in her work is an integral part of her process. She has collaborated with composers Michael Riesman for Odalisque and The Rug; Rhys Chatham for The Box; Martin Bresnik for This Is Just To Say; Miroslav Tadic for Flying Circus: An Imagined Memoir; Anna Oxygen for As You Desire Me; Jesse Gilbert and Tanya Haden for Drawing Lessons; and Archie Carey and Odeya Nini for A Modern Convenience. The poet Mark Strand performed the voice over for the film Drawing Lessons.

Selwood has had solo drawing exhibits at Track 16 (2010) and the Rosamund Felsen Gallery (2015) titled Sounding the Note of A. Sounding the Note of A featured transfer prints on paper, as well as large sculptural pieces inspired by the balaclavas of the band Pussy Riot. The show explored themes of treason and the heroism of feminine resistance throughout history. Also in 2015, Selwood wrote and directed 29 Cross Examinations which premiered at Automata Performance Space in Chinatown. This was a hybrid performance piece featuring animation, movement, and text from the transcriptions of the trial of Joan of Arc.

Selwood lives in Los Angeles and continues to teach at the California Institute of the Arts on the faculty of the School of Film/Video in the Experimental Animation program.

== Themes ==
Selwood is known for developing a pictographic language of interiorized and unconscious drawings. Her work features drawing often in relation to photographic elements or live film footage. Her work is often rooted in art history, mythology, and women on the fringe. Her work deals with states of mutability in the human psyche, film noir, dada and surrealism. Her films have been influenced by and compared to Matisse's Fauvism, Cocteau, Fellini and Aldrich, as well as her longtime friend and mentor Jules Engel. She has been credited for helping to challenge conventional notions of women as objects of desire in art history.

== Filmography and notable works ==
Odalisque: Three Fantasies in Pursuit (1980)
The Rug (1985)
This is Just to Say (1987)
Pearls (1988)
Flying Circus: An Imagined Memoir (1995)
Hail Mary (1998)
Mistaken Identity (2001)
Drawing Lessons (2006)
I Started Early (2007)
As The Veil Lifts (2008)
As You Desire Me (2009)
A Modern Convenience (2012)
Sounding the Note of A (2015)

== Screenings and installations ==
Selwood's work has been shown internationally, including Sharjah Biennial (2013), with retrospectives at Se-Ma-For International Film Festival (2014), National Institute of Design, Ahmedabad, India (2013), REDCAT, and ANIMAC International Animation Festival, Spain (2003). Her films have been screened at Annecy Animation Film Festival, Venice Biennale, New York Film Festival, Hong Kong Film Festival, Centre Georges Pompidou, Ann Arbor Film Festival, MOMA, SXSW, Ottawa Film Festival, Cardiff Film Festival, Cork Film Festival, Dallas Film Festival, Atlanta Film Festival Chicago Film Festival, and many others. Installations include Tevereterno (Rome, 2006), River to Festival (New York, 2008), Frac Picardie, (France, 2008), American Academy in Rome (2003), MAK Center for Art and Architecture, (Los Angeles, 2001) and others.

== Preservation ==
The Academy Film Archive has preserved two of Selwood's films: Odalisque, in 2017, and The Rugs, in 2019.

== Awards and grants ==
- John Solomon Guggenheim Foundation;
- Center for Cultural Innovation (Los Angeles);
- C.O.L.A Individual Artists Fellowship (LA) 41
- New York State Council on the Arts;
- The Jerome Foundation;
- The American Film Institute.
- She has held visiting artist residencies at the MacDowell Colony and ARTELUKU (Spain),
- Rome Prize in Visual Arts; American Academy in Rome.

== Publications and writings ==
In 2008, Selwood published the book Green Is For Privacy, with an introduction by the poet James Galvin.

Selwood is a featured artist in the 2013 book ANIMATION SKETCHBOOKS by Laura Heit; 2006 The Fundamentals of Animation by Paul Wells; 2003, Animac Magazine: Writings on Animation by Giannalberto Bendazzi, George Griffin and Mario Sesti; 1996 The Encyclopedia of Animation Techniques by Richard Taylor; 1994 Cartoons: One Hundred Years of Cinema Animation by Gianalberto Bendazzi and 1988 Experimental Animation: Origins of a New Art edited by Robert Russett and Cecile Starr.

Selwood contributed to the compilation book Titters: The First Collection of Humor by Women; Frames by George Griffin; Jennifer Heath's The Veil: Women Writers on Its History, Lore and Politics.
