= Sandra Equihua =

Mexican animator and illustrator

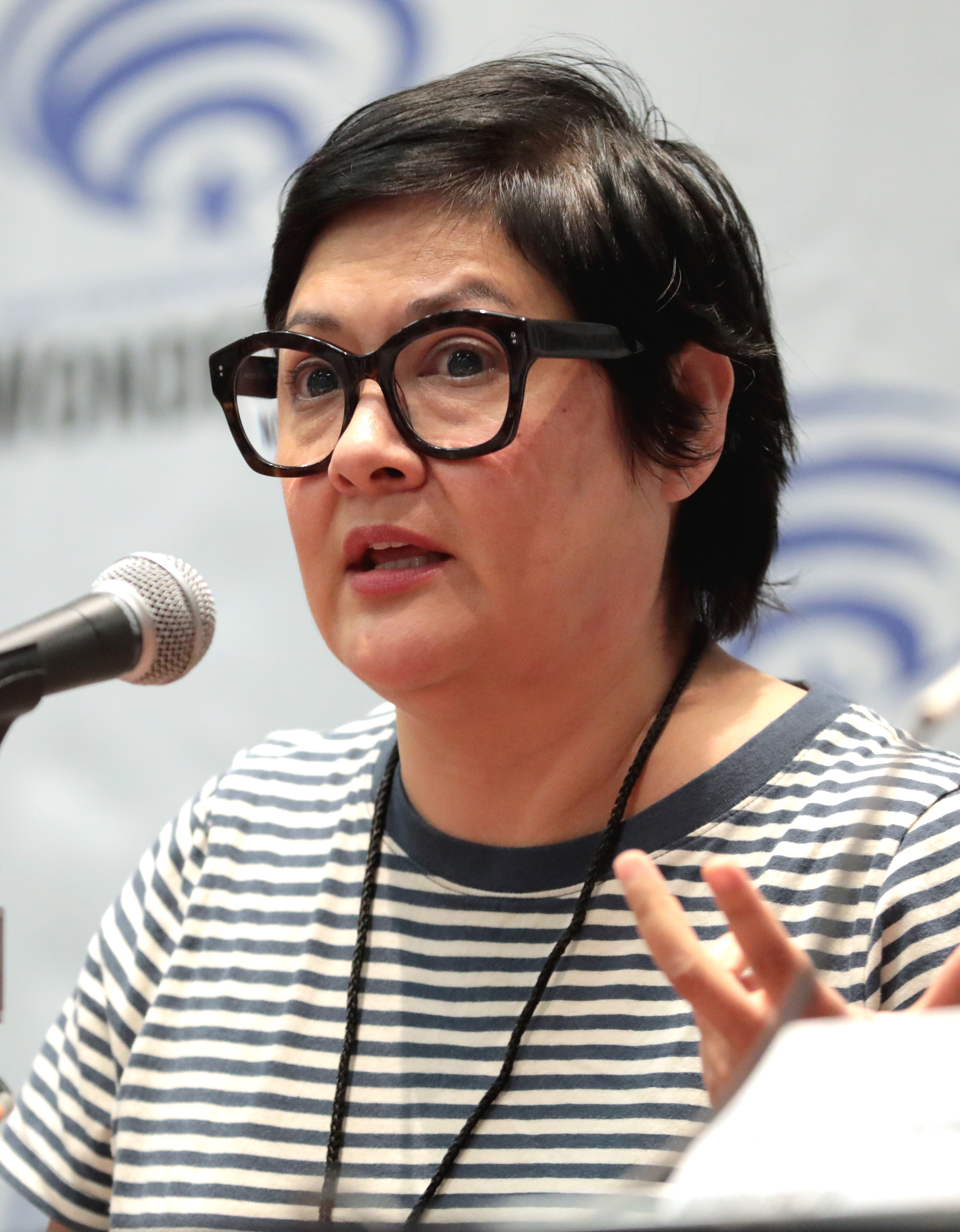
- Equihua at the 2023 WonderCon
- Born: Sandra Equihua; Tijuana, Baja California, Mexico
- Known for: Co-creating El Tigre: The Adventures of Manny Rivera
- Notable work: El Tigre, The Book of Life, Son of Jaguar, Maya and the Three
- Spouse: Jorge R. Gutiérrez (m. 2001)
- Awards: Annie, Emmy

Sandra Equihua is a Mexican animator, painter, sculptor, character designer, voice actress, and illustrator.

== Biography ==
Born and raised in Tijuana, Mexico, Sandra attended the Universidad Iberoamericana (IBERO) and received her BFA in Graphic Design in Tijuana, Mexico. While studying under illustrator Rafael Lopez at Art Center at Night in San Diego, she learned to conceptualize, experiment with technique, color and ideas, discovering her real passion was illustration. This expanded her artistic range and she moved to Los Angeles. She also studied under the Clayton Brothers at Art Center at Night in Pasadena.

Her original paintings have been shown in galleries both in Mexico and the United States. She designed characters for El Macho (Sony), ¡Mucha Lucha! (WB), The Buzz on Maggie (Disney), and Wow! Wow! Wubbzy! (Nick Jr.). Her work in the animation field includes illustration, character design, and voice acting. She melds the influences of mid-century design and her own Mexican heritage.

Equihua is married to artist Jorge R. Gutiérrez and together they created the Nickelodeon series El Tigre: The Adventures of Manny Rivera. The show dealt with issues such as immigration, ambition, romance, success and defeat. In October 2014 the 3D animated film The Book of Life was released, and Sandra designed all the female characters with reality flaws and personal touches to add authenticity. Symbolism and heritage are an essential part of her character development, evidenced in the use of traditional Mexican folkloric designs and other cultural references. The poetic, magical story references spaghetti westerns, bullfighting and pop music.

In 2018, Equihua creatively consulted, voiced and created character designs for Gutiérrez's Son of Jaguar, a VR short for Google Spotlight Stories.

In 2021, Equihua creatively consulted, voiced and created character designs for Gutiérrez's event series Maya and the Three at Netflix Animation.

== Awards ==
Sandra Equihua won an Annie and Emmy Award for her character designs on El Tigre: The Adventures of Manny Rivera. She was the first Latina artist to achieve the honor. She won an Annie for her character designs for The Book of Life.
