= The Book of Life (2014 film) =

2014 film by Jorge R. Gutierrez

- Theatrical release poster
- Directed by: Jorge R. Gutierrez
- Screenplay by: Jorge R. Gutierrez; Doug Langdale
- Produced by: Guillermo del Toro; Brad Booker; Aaron D. Berger; Carina Schulze
- Starring: Christina Applegate; Ice Cube; Kate Del Castillo; Diego Luna; Ron Perlman; Zoe Saldaña; Channing Tatum
- Edited by: Ahren Shaw
- Music by: Gustavo Santaolalla
- Production companies: 20th Century Fox; Reel FX Animation Studios
- Distributed by: 20th Century Fox
- Release date: October 17, 2014 (United States)
- Running time: 95 minutes
- Country: United States
- Language: English
- Budget: $50 million
- Box office: $100 million

The Book of Life is a 2014 American animated fantasy adventure comedy film directed by Jorge R. Gutierrez in his feature directorial debut, and written by Gutierrez and Doug Langdale. Guillermo del Toro, Brad Booker, Aaron D. Berger and Carina Schulze produced the film. Produced by 20th Century Fox and Reel FX Animation Studios, it features the voices of Diego Luna, Zoe Saldaña, and Channing Tatum, with supporting roles from Christina Applegate, Ice Cube, Kate del Castillo, and Ron Perlman. Based on an original idea by Gutierrez, the film tells the story of Manolo Sánchez (Luna), a bullfighter who wants to be a musician and win the love of his love interest, María Posada, as he confronts personal challenges on the Day of the Dead.

The Book of Life premiered in Los Angeles on October 12, 2014, and was released theatrically in the United States on October 17, 2014, by 20th Century Fox. It received mostly positive reviews from critics and a Golden Globe nomination for Best Animated Feature Film. The film grossed $100 million on a $50 million budget.

== Plot ==
Mary Beth, a museum tour guide, takes a group of students serving detention on a secret tour, telling them the story of San Angel, a Mexican town, from the Book of Life, which holds all stories in the world.

Many years ago, on the Day of the Dead, La Muerte, ruler of the Land of the Remembered, and Xibalba, ruler of the Land of the Forgotten, see young Manolo Sánchez and Joaquín Mondragon Jr. competing for María Posada's love. The gods agree that if María marries Manolo, Xibalba will no longer interfere in mortal affairs, but if Maria marries Joaquín, La Muerte and Xibalba will swap realms. Xibalba cheats by giving Joaquín his Medal of Everlasting Life, which grants the wearer invincibility.

A rebellious María frees the butcher's pigs, causing a stampede from which Manolo and Joaquín save the town. To correct her behavior, her father, General Ramiro Posada, sends her to be educated in Spain. Before parting ways, Manolo gives María a baby pig that he names Chuy, and she gives him a new guitar as a replacement for his old one. Years later, María returns to San Angel, where Joaquín has become a military hero with the Medal's power. Manolo has been trained by his father Carlos in their family tradition of bullfighting, but is firmly opposed to killing the bull, and dreams of being a musician.

At his first bullfight, Manolo refuses to kill the bull, angering Carlos and the crowd but impressing María. Posada pressures María to marry Joaquín, desperate to keep him in San Angel and protect the town from the Bandit King Chakal. Instead, María and Manolo profess their love for each other, but Xibalba sends his dual-headed snake to intervene. Believing María has been fatally bitten, a devastated Manolo allows himself to be bitten as well, hoping they will be reunited in death.

In the Land of the Remembered, Manolo is met by his deceased mother Carmen and their ancestors. Having won the bet, Xibalba now rules La Muerte's realm, and explains that María was only bitten once, putting her in a trance, while Manolo was killed by being bitten twice. Determined to expose Xibalba's cheating, Manolo, Carmen, and his grandfather Luis travel to the Cave of Souls and meet the Candle Maker, overseer of mortal lives and keeper of the Book of Life.

Realizing that Manolo is still writing his own story, the Candle Maker takes them to the Land of the Forgotten to inform La Muerte of Xibalba's treachery. She confronts Xibalba, who agrees to resurrect Manolo if he completes a challenge of Xibalba's choosing; if he fails, his spirit will be forgotten and Xibalba will keep both realms. Believing Manolo's biggest fear is bullfighting, Xibalba sets him against a giant skeletal bull made from all bulls killed by the Sánchez family.

Meanwhile, María awakens and is heartbroken to learn of Manolo's death. She reluctantly accepts Joaquín's proposal, but he begins to reconsider after seeing her despair. Their wedding is interrupted by Chakal, who has led his army to San Angel to reclaim the Medal he once stole from Xibalba. Carlos sacrifices himself, arriving in the Land of the Remembered as Manolo faces the bull. Realizing that his biggest fear is actually being himself, Manolo sings an apology to the bull for its suffering. Soothed by his song, the bull transforms into marigold petals, greatly impressing Xibalba, and allowing Carlos to finally respect his son's wishes.

The three deities resurrect Manolo to defend San Angel with María, Joaquín, and the spirits of the Sánchez family. Chakal lights a series of bombs across his body, planning to destroy the town with him. To shield the blast, Manolo traps himself and Chakal inside the town's collapsed church bell; Joaquín secretly gives Manolo the Medal, ensuring his survival while Chakal perishes. Joaquín returns the Medal to Xibalba and resolves to be a hero without it. Manolo and María marry, and Xibalba and La Muerte reconcile.

In the present day, as the children leave the museum, Mary Beth and a security guard unveil their forms as La Muerte and Xibalba. The Candle Maker appears, encouraging the audience to write their own story.

== Voice cast ==
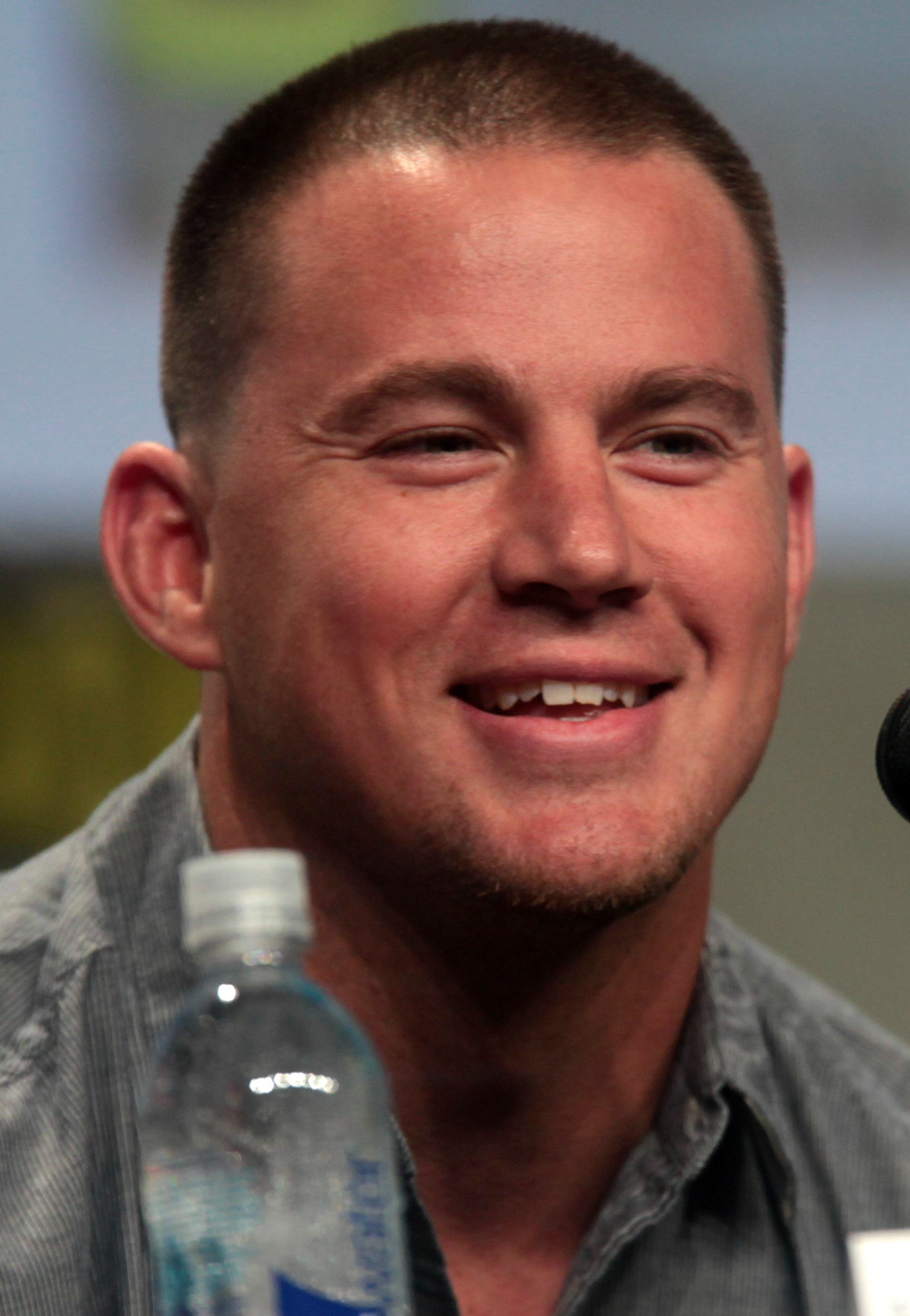
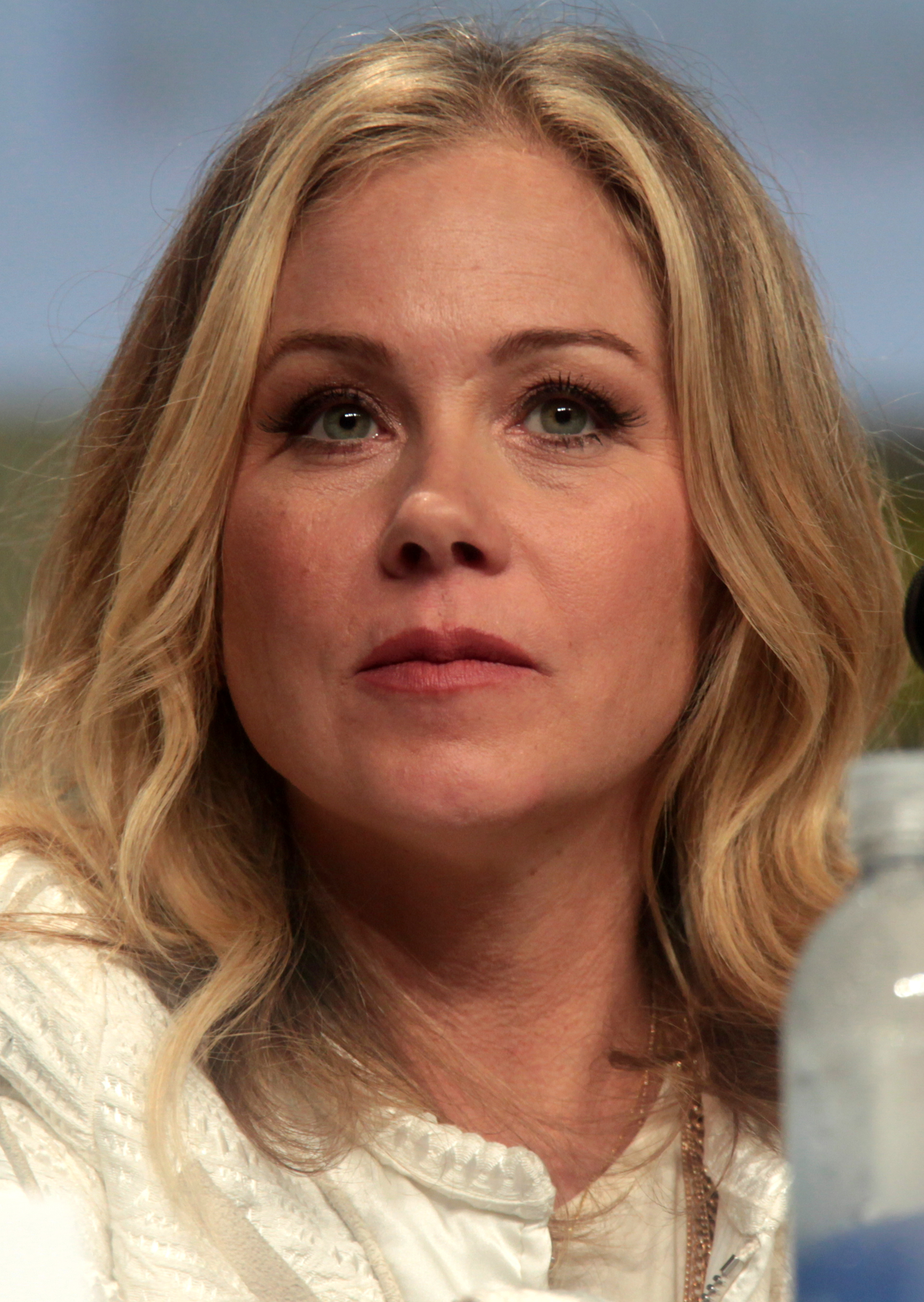
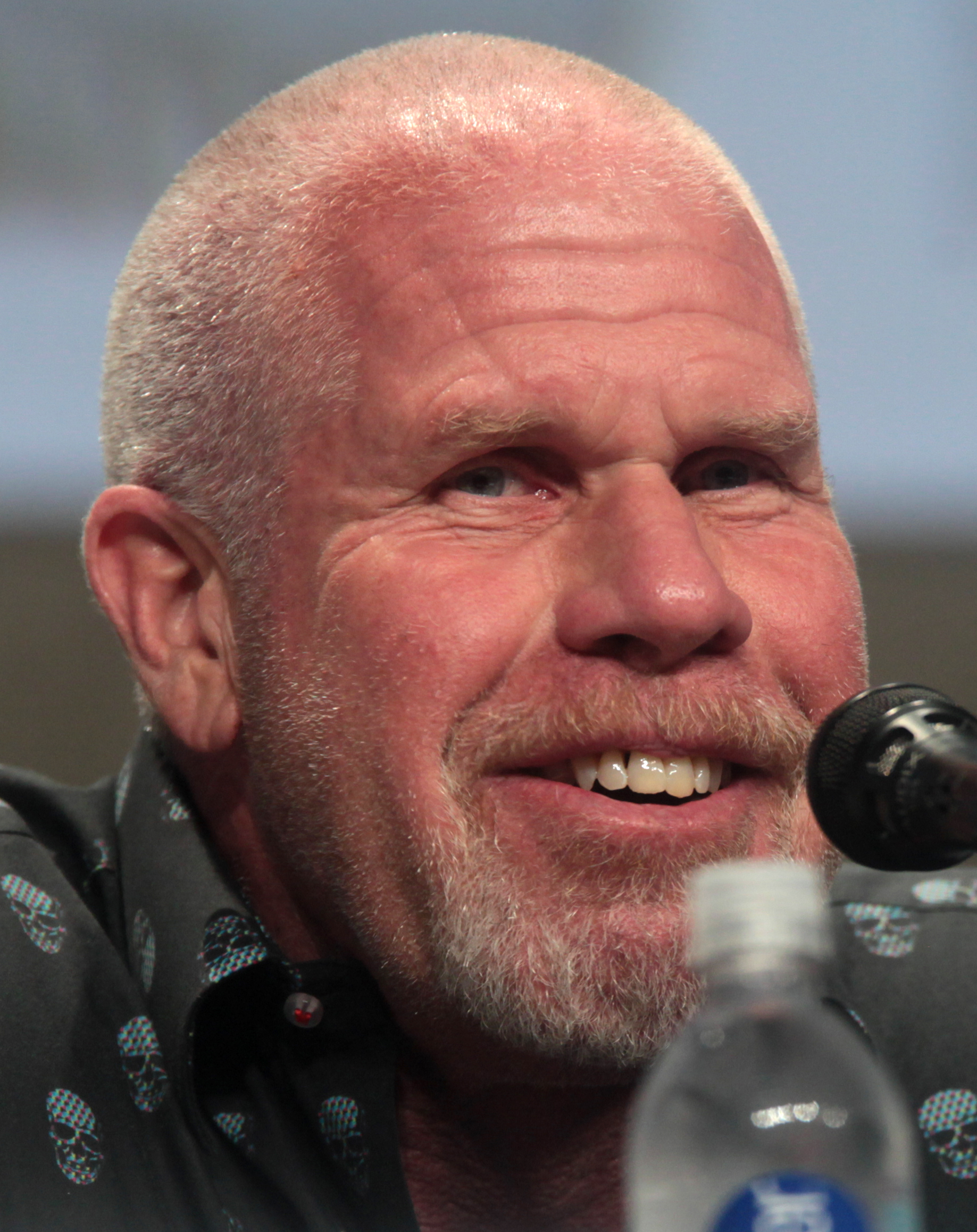
Channing Tatum, Christina Applegate and Ron Perlman at The Book of Life panel at the 2014 San Diego Comic-Con
- Diego Luna as Manolo Sánchez, a torero with a guitar and two swords, and the youngest in a family of skilled bullfighters.
  - Emil-Bastien Bouffard as a young Manolo.
  - Joe Matthews as young Manolo's singing voice.
- Zoe Saldaña as María Posada, Manolo and Joaquín's best friend and mutual love interest. She is also General Ramiro Posada's daughter.
  - Genesis Ochoa as a young María.
- Channing Tatum as Joaquín Mondragon Jr., a young man who is Manolo's closest friend and the town hero of San Angel.
  - Elias Garza as a young Joaquín.
- Ice Cube as the Candle Maker, a being who oversees the lives and stories of the living through candles and the Book of Life, which he also oversees
- Ron Perlman as Xibalba, the ruler of the Land of the Forgotten and La Muerte's husband.
- Kate del Castillo as La Muerte, the ruler of the Land of the Remembered and Xibalba's wife.
  - Christina Applegate as Mary Beth, a museum tour guide, the story's narrator and one of La Muerte's disguises.
  - Tonita Castro as La Muerte disguised as an old woman.
- Héctor Elizondo as Carlos Sánchez, Manolo's well-meaning yet extremely harsh father.
- Ana de la Reguera as Carmen Sánchez, Manolo's deceased mother. She was credited as "Skeleton Carmen".
- Danny Trejo as Luis Sánchez, Manolo's deceased grandfather. He was credited as "Skeleton Luis".
- Grey Griffin as Grandma Anita Sánchez, Manolo's short great-grandmother who later dies due to cholesterol problems.
- Carlos Alazraqui as General Ramiro Posada, Maria's father who serves as the mayor of San Angel and the general of its army.
  - Alazraqui also voices Dali, a member of San Angel's army, and Chuy, María's loyal pig pet who thinks that he is a goat.
- Plácido Domingo as Jorge Sánchez, Manolo's deceased granduncle who wears an eyepatch over his left eye and swords on his right arm and left leg and can sing opera songs. He was credited as "Skeleton Jorge".
- Jorge R. Gutierrez as Carmelo Sánchez, Manolo's deceased tall and burly Aztec/Mayan ancestor who is often called a savage by Jorge. He was credited as "Skeleton Carmelo".
- Gabriel Iglesias as Pepe Rodríguez, the largest of the three musicians.
- Cheech Marin as Pancho Rodríguez, the medium-sized of the three musicians.
- Ricardo Sánchez as Pablo Rodriguez, the shortest of the three musicians.
- Dan Navarro as Chakal, the Bandit King.
- Eugenio Derbez as Chato, a member and second of Chakal's group of bandits.
- Anjelah Johnson as Adelita, one of Manolo's deceased cousins and Scardelita's twin sister. She perished during the Mexican Revolution while protecting Emiliano Zapata.
- Sandra Equihua as Scardelita, one of Manolo's deceased cousins and Adelita's twin sister who wears an eyepatch. She perished during the Mexican Revolution while protecting Emiliano Zapata.
- Miguel Sandoval as the Land of the Remembered Captain, the guide to the Land of the Remembered and the resident that Manolo meets first.
- Angélica María Hartman Ortiz as Sister Ana, a Catholic sister who works in San Angel's church.
- Sandra Echeverría as Claudia, a beautiful woman at San Angel and one of Joaquín's biggest fans.
- Trey Bumpass as Luka Ramirez, a Goth boy and one of the detention students in the present world who listens to Manolo's story from Mary Beth. He was credited as "Goth Kid".
  - Bumpass also voices an orphan in San Angel
- Kennedy "KK" Peil as Sasha, a little girl and one of the detention students in the present world who listens to Manolo's story from Mary Beth.
- Ishan Sharma as Sanjay, a boy and one of the detention students in the present world who listens to Manolo's story from Mary Beth.
- Callahan Clark as Jane, a girl and one of the detention students in the present world who listens to Manolo's story from Mary Beth.
- Eric Bauza as Father Domingo, a priest that works in San Angel's church.
  - Bauza also voices Cave Guardian, the guardian of the Cave of Souls.
- Aron Warner as Thomas, a museum tour guide.
- Troy Evans as Old Man Hemingway, an old man who lived at San Angel.
- Guillermo del Toro as the Land of the Remembered Captain's Wife, the unnamed wife of the Land of the Remembered Captain who died of a broken heart.
- Brad Booker as a train conductor

== Production ==
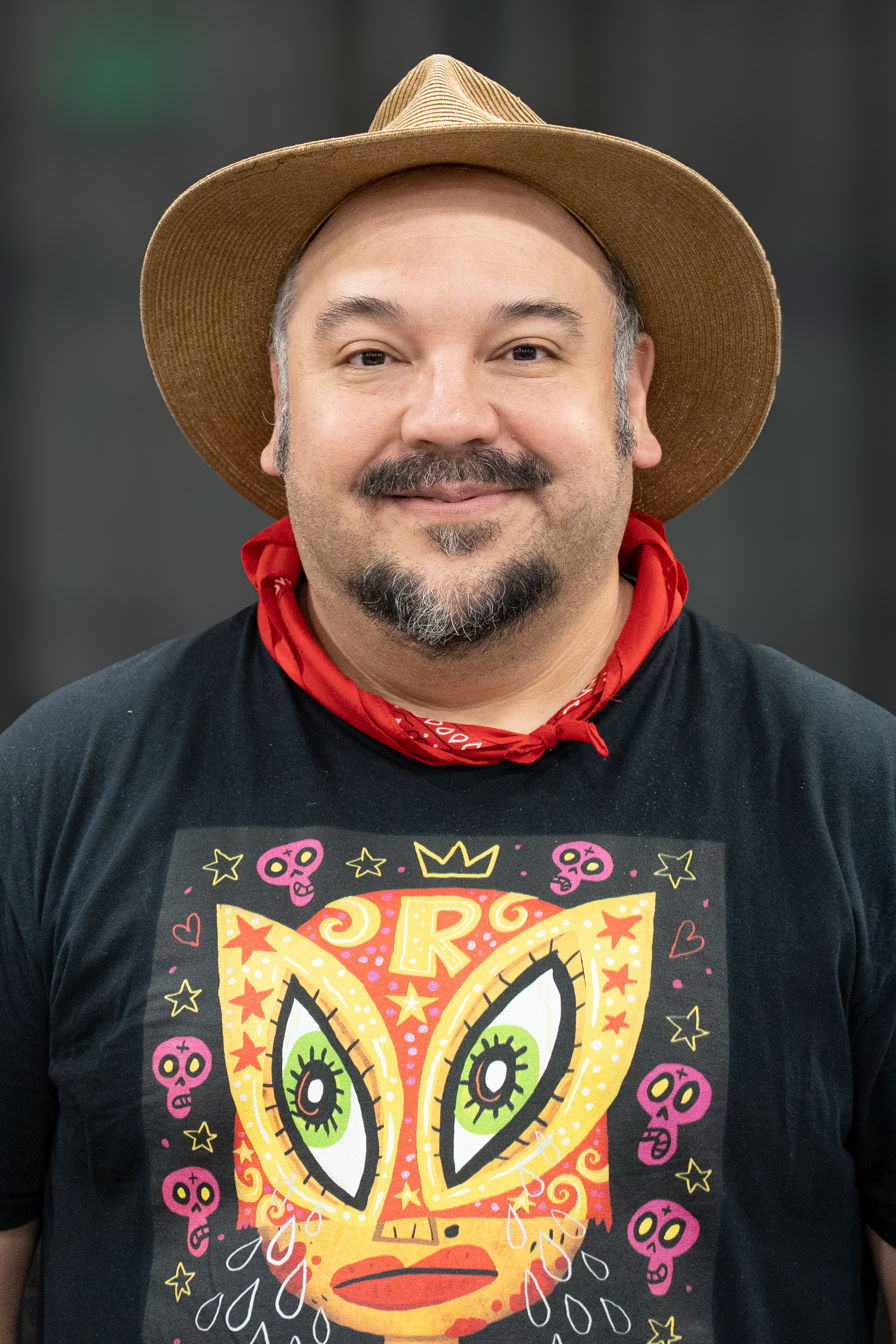
Jorge Gutierrez at Comic Con Oakland 2026

Jorge R. Gutierrez first began developing The Book of Life fourteen years before its release. Several of the film's story ideas originated in Gutierrez's 2000 student film Carmelo. The opportunity to have The Book of Life produced as a feature film arrived after Gutierrez and his wife, Sandra Equihua, created the Nickelodeon animated series El Tigre: The Adventures of Manny Rivera.

The Book of Life was originally optioned by DreamWorks Animation in 2007, but never went beyond development because of "creative differences". DreamWorks wanted the film to be "a hip-hop salsa reggaeton musical" set in present-day urban New York, proposing that Gutierrez work with Lin-Manuel Miranda. From there Gutierrez took film rights to Reel FX, with 20th Century Fox handling distribution rights. Guillermo del Toro joined as a producer. The film was initially given a release date of October 10, 2014; however, this was eventually moved back by a week. On October 16, 2013, it was announced that Channing Tatum, Zoe Saldaña, Diego Luna and Christina Applegate would star as voice actors in the film.

Gutierrez wanted to make the final animation look like the concept artwork, saying: "I saw every single one that comes out and my biggest heartbreak is that I see all this glorious art, and then the movie doesn't look like that! The mandate of this movie was: Our 'Art of' book is going to look exactly like the movie. And every artist poured their heart and soul into that idea." Gutierrez did not permit his animation team to go on any research trips to Mexico, feeling that such trips often only covered very touristy aspects of the culture. Instead, he had the team address any questions they had about the region to him. He also stated that research trips would not be necessary to portray the film's "magic version of Mexico". Explaining that the tone of the film as initially conceived was going to be much darker, Gutierrez said, "I always felt, much like the design, I need to push the envelope so that when I pull back, I end up with something I love."

== Release ==
The posters painted the characters' doll joints to look more human since they were scared audiences would not be able to feel empathy for wooden folk art dolls.

The Book of Life made its world premiere in Los Angeles on October 12, 2014. It was released on October 17, 2014, in North America.

=== Home media ===
The Book of Life was released on DVD, Blu-ray and Blu-ray 3D on January 27, 2015, by 20th Century Fox Home Entertainment. The special features included a three-minute short animated film, titled The Adventures of Chuy. The film currently streams on Disney+ as of March 2026.

== Music ==
In April 2013, it was announced Gustavo Santaolalla and Paul Williams would be adapting pop songs for the film. The soundtrack was released on September 26, 2014, while the score was released on October 24, 2014.

== Reception ==
=== Box office ===
The Book of Life grossed $50.2 million in North America and $49.8 million in other countries for a worldwide total of $100 million, against a production budget of $50 million.

The Book of Life was released in the United States and Canada on October 17, 2014. The film earned $300,000 from Thursday late night showings from 2,150 theatres and $4.9 million on its opening day. The film debuted at number three in its opening weekend, earning $17 million at an average of $5,537 per theatre behind Fury ($23.5 million) and Gone Girl ($17.8 million). The film played 57% female and 54% under the age of 25 years. It played 59% under 10 years old while 31% of tickets sold were in 3D.

In other territories, The Book of Life earned $8.58 million from 3,654 screens in 19 markets. The highest-earning debuts came from Mexico ($3.84 million) and Brazil ($1.98 million). In Mexico, the film was number two behind the local film Perfect Dictatorship.

=== Critical reception ===
On Rotten Tomatoes, the film has an approval rating of 82% based on 125 reviews and an average rating of 6.90/10. The site's critical consensus reads: "The Book of Life's gorgeous animation is a treat, but it's a pity that its story lacks the same level of craft and detail that its thrilling visuals provide." On Metacritic, the film has a weighted average score of 67 out of 100 based on reviews from 27 critics, indicating "generally favorable reviews". Audiences polled by CinemaScore gave the film an average grade of "A−" on an A+ to F scale.

Geoff Berkshire of Variety wrote, "Repping a major step forward for Dallas-based Reel FX Animation Studios (after their anemic feature bow on last year's Free Birds), the beautifully rendered CG animation brings an unusually warm and heartfelt quality to the high-tech medium and emerges as the film's true calling card." Frank Scheck of The Hollywood Reporter wrote, "The Book of Life is a visually stunning effort that makes up for its formulaic storyline with an enchanting atmosphere that sweeps you into its fantastical world, or in this case, three worlds." Simon Abrams of The Village Voice wrote that the film's "hackneyed stock plot preaches tolerance while lamely reinforcing the status quo". Marc Snetiker of Entertainment Weekly gave the film an A−, saying "Overflowing with hyperactive charm and a spectacular sea of colors, it showcases some of the most breathtaking animation we've seen this decade." Claudia Puig of USA Today gave the film two-and-a-half stars out of four, saying "The dizzying, intricate imagery is so beautiful, and the Latin-inspired songs catchy enough that the overall effect is often enchanting." Sara Stewart of The New York Post gave the film two out of four stars, saying "Just in time for Mexico's Day of the Dead holiday comes this gloriously colorful animated musical, which almost (but not quite) makes up in visuals what it lacks in snappy dialogue." Katie Rife of The A.V. Club gave the film a B−, saying "Ultimately, what drags The Book Of Life down is its insistence on trying to update an (original) folkloric story for a contemporary audience. In practice, this means adding some pop-cultural touches that only serve to take the viewer out of the fantastic setting."

Michael Ordoña of the San Francisco Chronicle gave the film three out of five stars, saying "The vibrant animated feature The Book of Life is a cheeky celebration of Mexican folklore with a solid cast, an irreverent sensibility and gorgeous visuals." Michael O'Sullivan of The Washington Post gave the film three out of five stars, saying "The Book of Life may use state-of-the-art animation, but it derives its strength from the wisdom of antiquity. It only looks new, but it's as old as life (and death) itself. Bill Goodykoontz of The Arizona Republic gave the film four out of five stars, saying "A visually stunning, funny movie that trusts children to deal with subject matter that many films don't: specifically, death." Frank Lovece of Newsday gave the film three out of four stars, saying "Funny without being frantic, seamlessly switching from dry humor to slapstick, it shows death as a part of life—and, judging from a preview audience of very young tykes, does so in a gentle, delightful way." Manohla Dargis of The New York Times gave the film a negative review, saying "This often beautiful and too-often moribund, if exhaustingly frenetic, feature tends to be less energetic than the dead people waltzing through it." Conversely, Charles Solomon of the Los Angeles Times wrote, "The Book of Life juxtaposes overwrought visual imagery with an undernourished, familiar story—regrettable flaws in one of the few animated films to focus on Latino characters and the rich heritage of Mexican folk culture." Marjorie Baumgarten of The Austin Chronicle gave the film two-and-a-half stars out of five, saying "Visually arresting but dramatically rote, The Book of Life at least introduces American kids to the Mexican holiday of Día de los Muertos and should score points with families looking for kid-friendly movies that reflect aspects of their Mexican cultural heritage."

Calvin Wilson of the St. Louis Post-Dispatch gave the film two-and-a-half stars out of five, saying "The Book of Life is a flawed but intriguing new chapter in animation." James Berardinelli of ReelViews gave the film three out of four stars, saying "The Book of Life moves breezily from one scene to the next, keeping the pace brisk and rarely skipping a beat." Laura Emerick of the Chicago Sun-Times gave the film three out of four stars, saying "Whether en ingles o en espanol, The Book of Life is a delight. In an animated universe cluttered with kung-fu pandas, ice princesses and video-game heroes, Gutierrez and del Toro have conjured up an original vision." Tasha Robinson of The Dissolve gave the film three-and-a-half stars out of five, saying "It's all flawed, and distracted, and conceptually messy, prioritizing color over common sense and energy over consistency. But as an afternoon's diversion for a handful of misbehaving kids—both within the movie, and within the movie theater—it's authentically winning." Michael Ordoña of the San Francisco Chronicle wrote, "There are no great surprises, no shocking reveals (except to the characters themselves). But there's so much to appreciate along the way that it's a real page-turner." Kenji Fujishima of Slant Magazine gave the film two out of four stars, saying "Jorge R. Gutierrez subsumes the film's darker themes in a relentlessly busy farrago of predictable kids'-movie tropes and annoying attempts at hipness." Ben Sachs of the Chicago Reader called it "more imaginative than most" but said it is "undone by a surfeit of glib one-liners and pop culture references".

=== Accolades ===
List of Awards and Nominations
Award	Category	Recipients	Results	Ref.
42nd Annual Annie Awards	Best Animated Feature	The Book of Life	Nominated	
42nd Annual Annie Awards	Animated Effects in an Animated Production	Augusto Schillaci, Erich Turner, Bill Konersman, Chris Rasch, Joseph Burnette	Nominated	
42nd Annual Annie Awards	Character Design in an Animated Feature Production	Paul Sullivan, Sandra Equihua, Jorge R. Gutierrez	Won	
42nd Annual Annie Awards	Directing in an Animated Feature Production	Jorge R. Gutierrez	Nominated	
42nd Annual Annie Awards	Production Design in an Animated Feature Production	Simon Varela & Paul Sullivan	Nominated	
4th Behind the Voice Actors Awards	Best Female Lead Vocal Performance in a Feature Film	Zoe Saldaña	Nominated	
4th Behind the Voice Actors Awards	Best Male Vocal Performance in a Feature Film in a Supporting Role	Ron Perlman	Nominated	
4th Behind the Voice Actors Awards	Best Female Vocal Performance in a Feature Film in a Supporting Role	Kate del Castillo	Nominated	
15th Black Reel Awards	Outstanding Voice Performance	Zoe Saldaña	Nominated	
30th Casting Society of America Awards	Outstanding Achievement in Casting – Animation Feature	Christian Kaplan	Nominated	
13th Central Ohio Film Critics Association Awards	Best Animated Film	The Book of Life	Nominated	
20th Critics' Choice Awards	Best Animated Feature	The Book of Life	Nominated	
4th Georgia Film Critics Association Awards	Best Animated Film	The Book of Life	Nominated	
72nd Golden Globe Awards	Best Animated Feature Film	The Book of Life	Nominated	
14th Golden Schmoes Awards	Best Animated Movie of the Year	The Book of Life	Nominated	
Hollywood Music in Media Awards	Best Original Score – Animated Film	Gustavo Santaolalla	Nominated	
Hollywood Music in Media Awards	Outstanding Music Supervision – Film	John Houlihan	Nominated	
8th Houston Film Critics Society Awards	Best Animated Film	The Book of Life	Nominated	
6th International 3D & Advanced Imaging Society Awards	3D Feature – Animated	The Book of Life	Nominated	
62nd MPSE Golden Reel Awards	Best Sound Editing – Animated Feature	The Book of Life	Nominated	
46th NAACP Image Awards	Outstanding Character Voice-Over Performance	Zoe Saldaña	Nominated	
26th Producers Guild of America Awards	Best Outstanding Producer of Animated Theatrical Motion Pictures	Guillermo del Toro and Brad Booker	Nominated	
19th Satellite Awards	Satellite Award for Best Animated or Mixed Media Feature	The Book of Life	Nominated	
11th St. Louis Film Critics Association Awards	Best Animated Film	The Book of Life	Nominated	
13th Visual Effects Society Awards	Outstanding Created Environment in an Animated Feature Motion Picture	"Magical Land of the Remembered"; Glo Minaya, Amy Chen, Sean McEwan, Jeff Masters	Nominated	
13th Washington D.C. Area Film Critics Association Awards	Best Animated Feature	The Book of Life	Nominated	

== Future ==
Gutierrez revealed in an interview that one of the ideas for the next chapter in the story involves Joaquin and his relationship with his father. "I had always imagined the first movie to be about Manolo, the second to be about Joaquín and the third one to be about Maria...I've always conceived it as a trilogy." In June 2017, Gutierrez and Reel FX Animation announced that development on the sequel had begun; however, as of June 2019, Gutierrez clarified on Twitter that there are currently no plans for a sequel.
