= 48th Daytime Creative Arts Emmy Awards =

- Date: June 25, 2021 (Creative Arts Awards); July 17, 2021 (Children’s Programming and Animation Awards); July 18, 2021 (Lifestyle Programming Awards)
- Location: Virtual
- Most awards: The Letter for the King (6)

Television/radio coverage
- Network: Emmys OTT Platform

The 48th Annual Daytime Creative Arts Emmy Awards, were presented by the National Academy of Television Arts and Sciences (NATAS), honoring the best in U.S. daytime television programming in 2020. The winners were revealed on June 25, 2021, while the nominations were announced alongside the main ceremony categories on May 25, 2021.

The nominations for both the Daytime Children’s Programming & Animation Emmy Awards and the Daytime Lifestyle Programming Emmy Awards were announced on June 28, 2021. The winners were announced via the Emmys OTT platform on July 17, 2021, for the Children’s Programming & Animation awards and on July 18, 2021, for the Lifestyle Programming awards.

== Winners and nominees ==
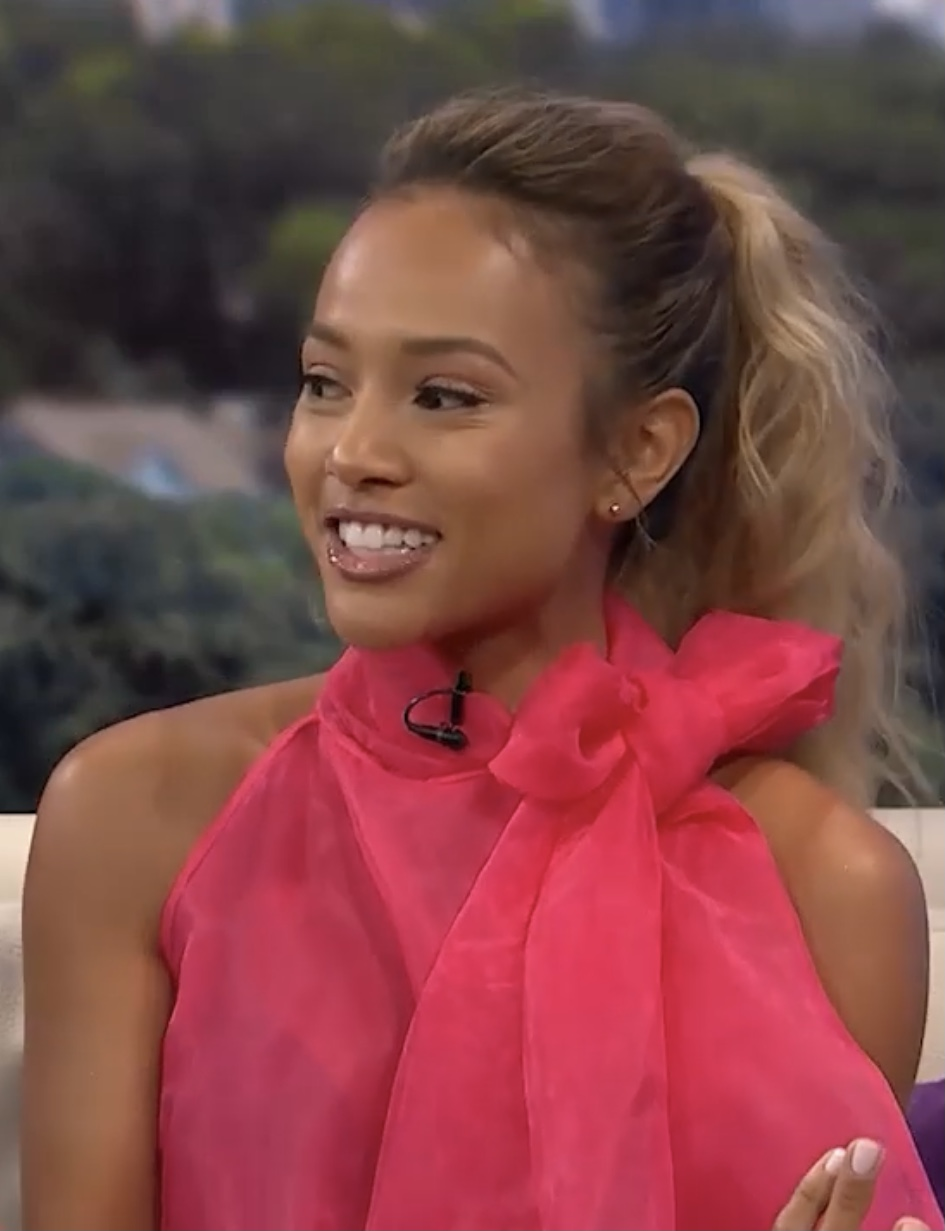
Karrueche Tran, Outstanding Performance by a Lead Actress in a Daytime Fiction Program winner

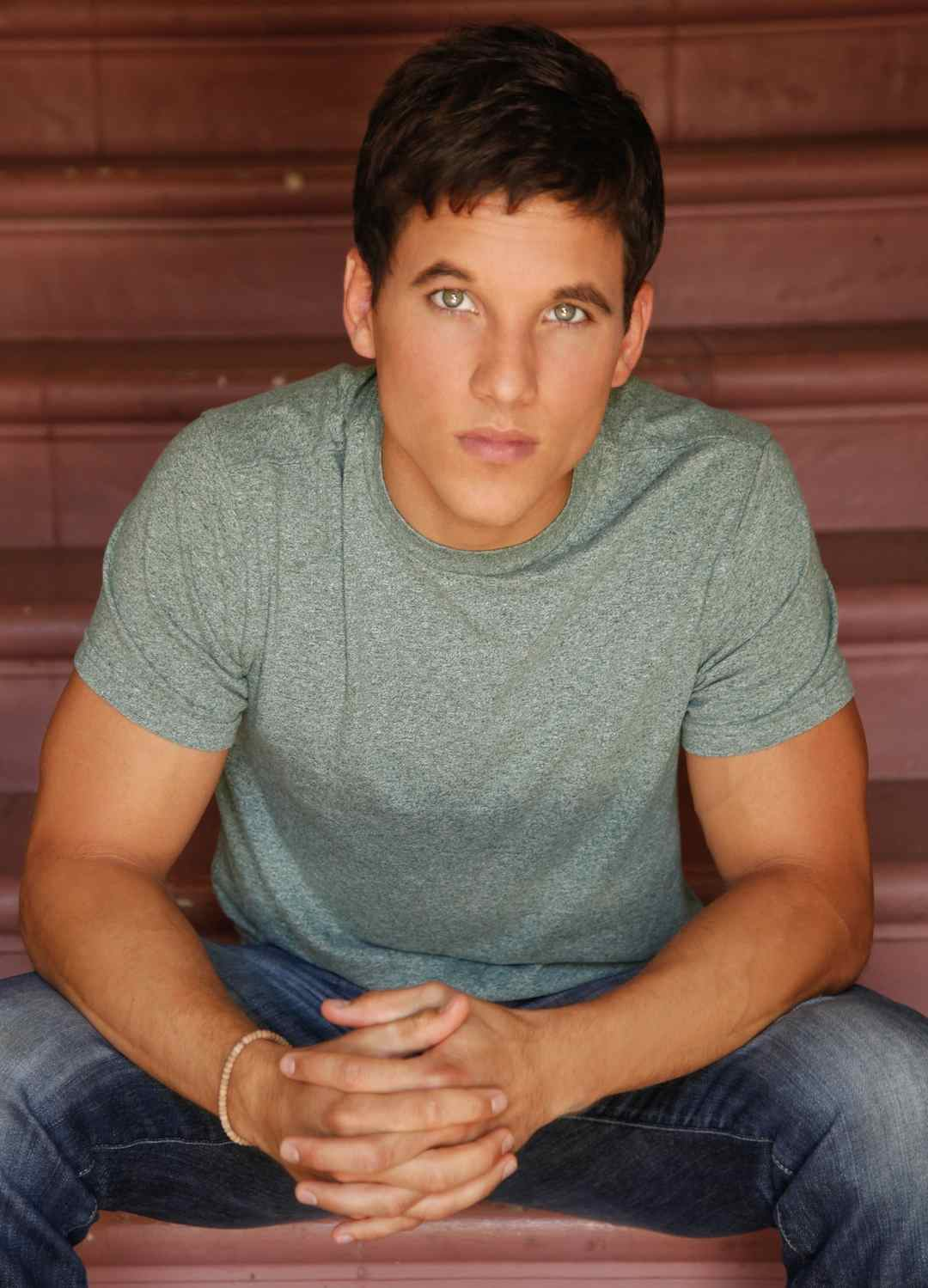
Mike Manning, Outstanding Performance by a Supporting Actor in a Daytime Fiction Program winner

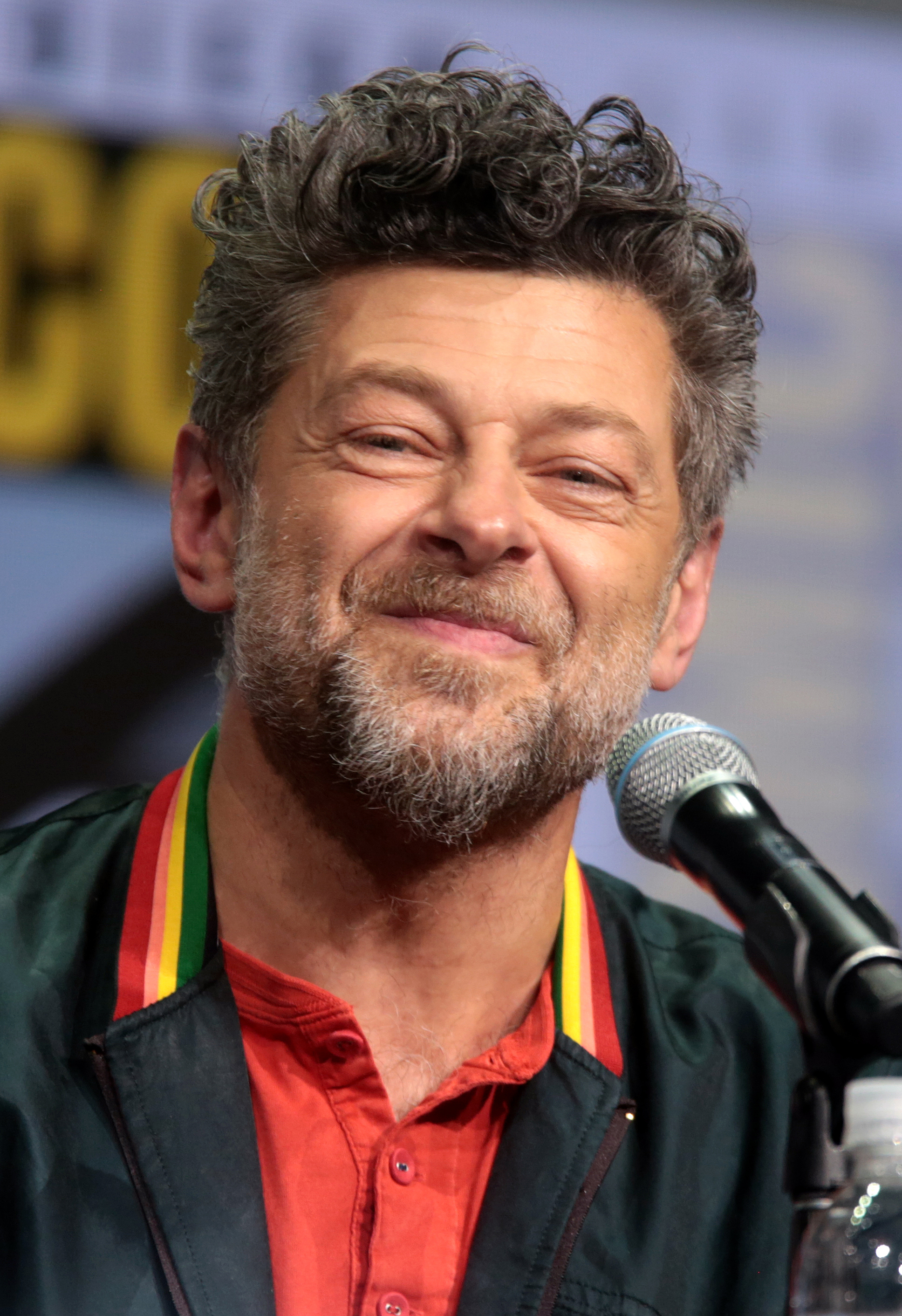
Andy Serkis, Outstanding Guest Performer in a Daytime Fiction Program winner

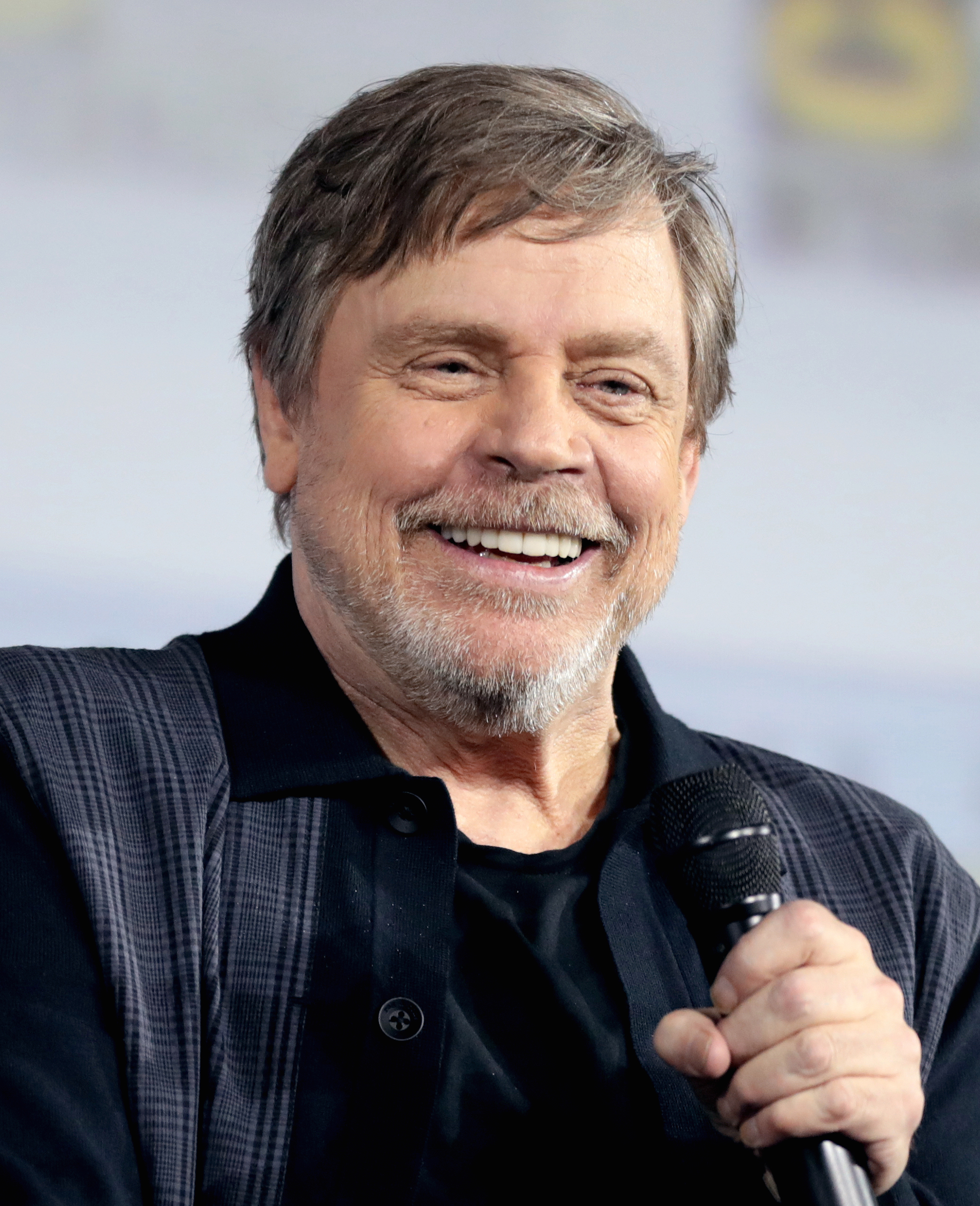
Mark Hamill, Outstanding Performer in a Preschool Animated Program winner

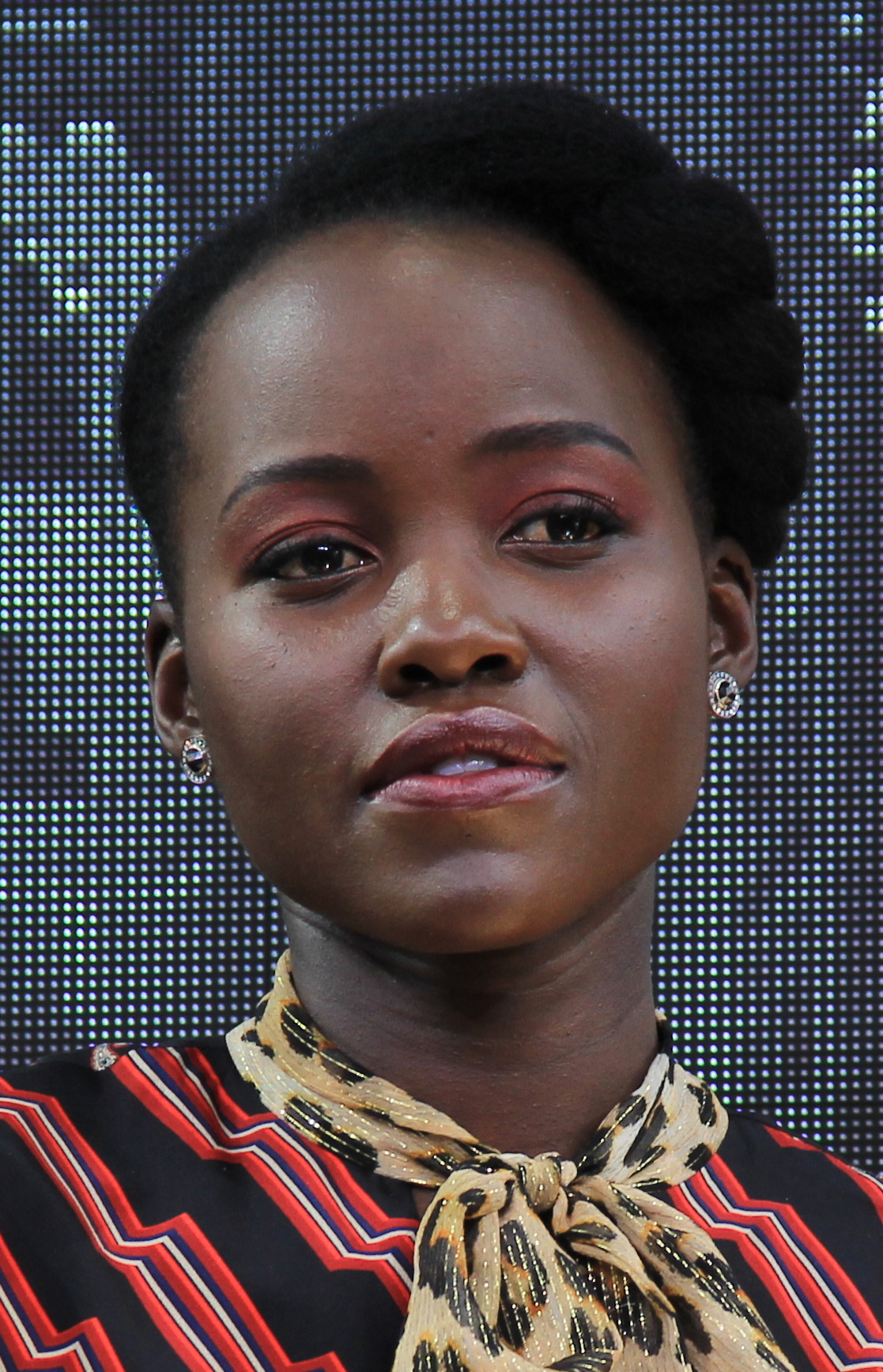
Lupita Nyong'o, Outstanding Limited Performance in a Children’s Program winner

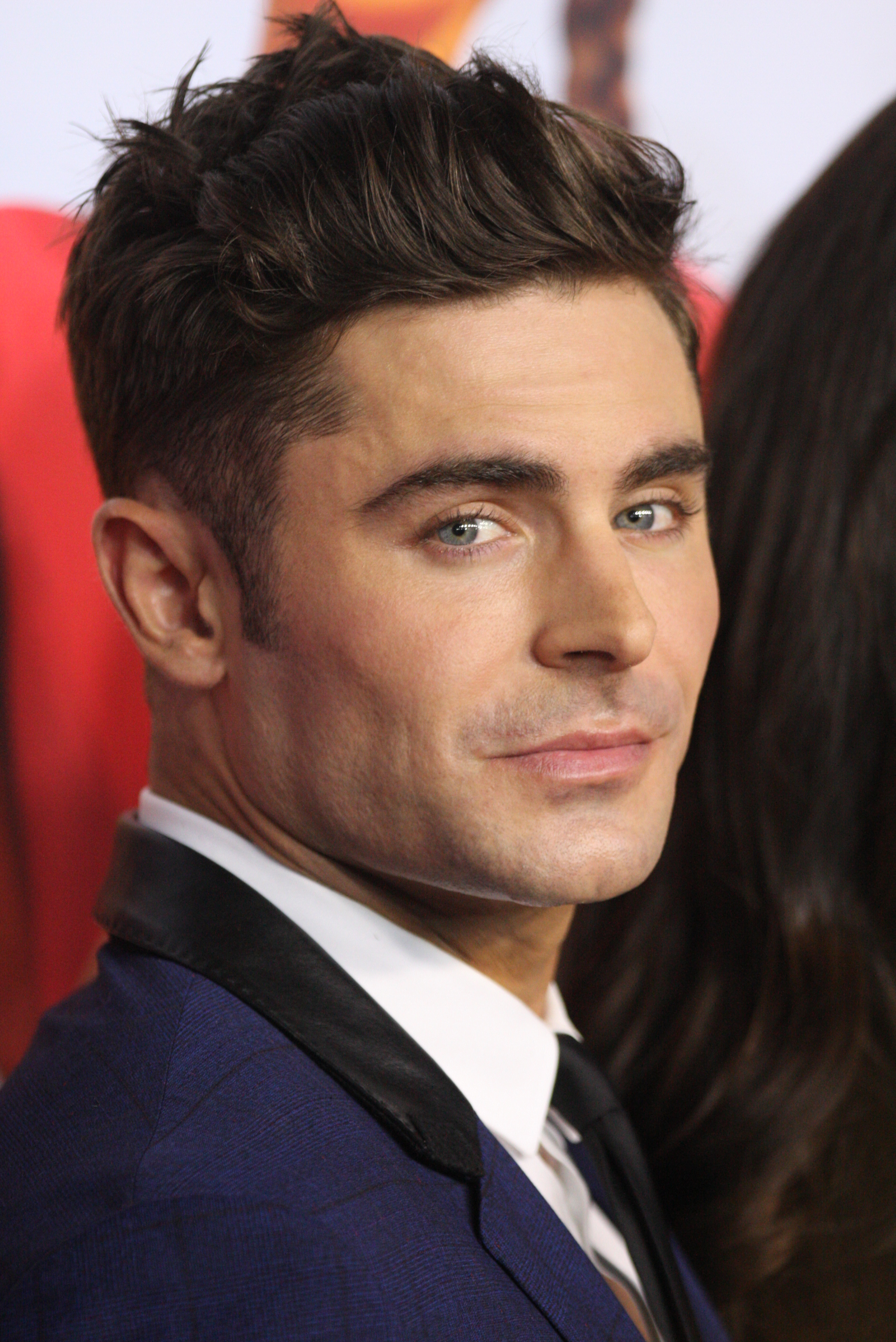
Zac Efron, Outstanding Daytime Program Host winner

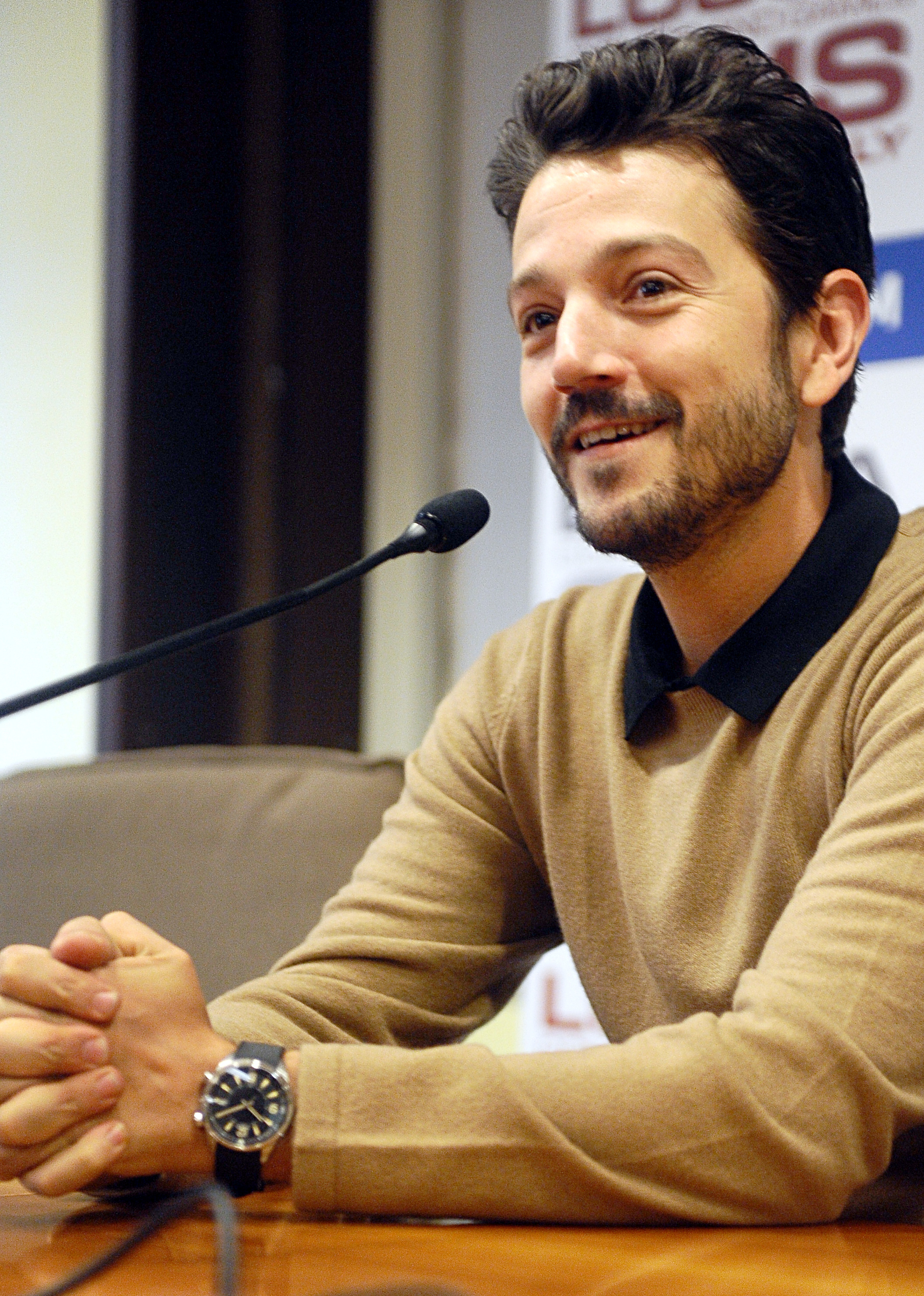
Diego Luna, Outstanding Daytime Talent in a Spanish Language Program winner

The nominees for the Daytime Creative Arts Emmy Awards were announced on May 25, 2021, while the nominees for the Daytime Children’s Programming & Animation Emmy Awards and the Daytime Lifestyle Programming Emmy Awards were announced on June 28, 2021.

Winners in each category are listed first, in boldface.

=== Programming ===
| Outstanding Daytime Fiction Program | Outstanding Young Adult Series |
|---|---|
| **The Girl in Apartment 15 (Amazon Prime Video)**; Doomsday (Vimeo); Finding Love in Quarantine (Pure Flix Digital); Rekindling Christmas (Amazon Prime Video); Take My Heart (YouTube.com) | **Trinkets (Netflix)**; Alexa & Katie (Netflix); Dash & Lily (Netflix); The Hardy Boys (Hulu); Julie and the Phantoms (Netflix) |
| Outstanding Culinary Series | Outstanding Lifestyle Series |
| **Barefoot Contessa: Cook Like a Pro (Food Network)**; Lidia’s Kitchen (PBS); Lucky Chow (PBS); Mise En Place (Eater); Pati’s Mexican Table (PBS); tasteMAKERS (PBS); Trisha's Southern Kitchen (Food Network) | **George to the Rescue (NBC)**; Home Made Simple with Laila Ali (OWN); Legacy List with Matt Paxton (PBS); Open House (NBC); Skin Decision: Before and After (Netflix); Small Business Revolution (Hulu) |
| Outstanding Travel, Adventure and Nature Program | Outstanding Instructional and How-To Program |
| **Tiny Creatures (Netflix)**; Down to Earth with Zac Efron (Netflix); Long Way Up (Apple TV+); Real Rail Adventures: Swiss International Hubs (PBS); Samantha Brown's Places to Love (PBS) | **This Old House (PBS)**; Ask This Old House (PBS); Dream Home Makeover (Netflix); Get Organized with The Home Edit (Netflix); I Like to Make Stuff (YouTube.com) |
| Outstanding Arts and Popular Culture Program | Outstanding Entertainment Program in Spanish |
| **Behind the FX (Netflix)**; The American Athlete (Syndicated); Articulate with Jim Cotter (PBS); Broadway Master Class (Broadway on Demand); Close Up with The Hollywood Reporter (SundanceTV) | **Pan y Circo (Amazon Prime Video)**; Café CNN (CNN en Español); Despierta America (Univision); Destinos (CNN en Español); El Gordo y la Flaca (Univision); Nuestro Mundo (CNN en Español); Un Nuevo Día (Telemundo) |
| Outstanding Preschool, Children's or Family Viewing Program | Outstanding Special Class Daytime Animated Series |
| **The Power of We: A Sesame Street Special (HBO Max)**; The Baby-Sitters Club (Netflix); Dino Dana The Movie (Amazon Prime Video); Mo Willems and the Storytime All-Stars Present: Don’t Let the Pigeon Do Storytime! (HBO Max); Odd Squad (PBS); Sesame Street (HBO) | **Here We Are: Notes for Living on Planet Earth (Apple TV+)**; Adventure Time: Distant Lands – "Obsidian" (HBO Max); Angela's Christmas Wish (Netflix); Baba Yaga (Baobab Studios); Xavier Riddle and the Secret Museum: I am Madame President (PBS) |
| Outstanding Pre-School Children's Animated Program | Outstanding Children's Animated Program |
| **The Adventures of Paddington (Nickelodeon)**; Elinor Wonders Why (PBS); Esme & Roy (HBO Max); Stillwater (Apple TV+); Trash Truck (Netflix) | **Hilda (Netflix)**; Amphibia (Disney Channel); Craig of the Creek (Cartoon Network); Kipo and the Age of Wonderbeasts (Netflix); Tales of Arcadia: Wizards (Netflix) |
| Outstanding Educational or Informational Series | Outstanding Short Form Children’s Program |
| **PBS KIDS Talk About (PBS)**; CNN/Sesame Street Town Halls (CNN); Deadly Engineering (Amazon Prime Video); Glad You Asked (YouTube Originals); The Henry Ford’s Innovation Nation (CBS); Life 2.0 (Syndicated) | **Girls' Voices Now (Here TV)**; Helpsters Help You (Apple TV+); Imagination Trips (Noggin); Monster Meditations (YouTube.com); Sesame Street: The Monster at the End of Your Story with Grover and Elmo (YouTube.com) |
| Outstanding Daytime Special Event | Outstanding Daytime Non-Fiction Special |
| **Space Launch Live: America Returns to Space (Discovery and Science Channel)** (Note: Winners: Aaron Fishman, Michael Miller, Scott Lewers, Caroline Perez, Gretchen Eisele, Todd Hoffman (executive producers); Eddie Delbridge, Kevin Harding, Tarin Laughlin (co-executive producers); Lindsey Foster Blumberg (supervising producer); Andrew Lessner (producer); Jessica Tomke (supervising story producer); Madison Williams (segment producer); Gayle Depoli, Dave Boone, Rachel Steinman, Sarah Barker (consulting producers); Christian Davenport (co-host/consulting producer); Chris Jacobs (host)); 94th Annual Macy’s Thanksgiving Day Parade (NBC); 2020 Film Independent Spirit Awards (IFC); David Blaine Ascension (YouTube Originals); Jeopardy! The Greatest of All Time (Syndicated) | **Creators for Change on Girls' Education with Michelle Obama (YouTube Originals)** (Note: Winners: Joanna Forscher, Chad Mumm, Dana Olkkonen, Mark W. Olsen (executive producers); Chloe Chapman (co-executive producer); Stef Gordon (line producer)); Call Your Mother (Comedy Central); I Am Patrick (CBN); The Manhattan Project – Electronic Field Trip (Digital Release); Reclamation: The Rise at Standing Rock (vimeo.com); Red Table Talk: Will Smith’s Red Table Takeover: Resolving Conflict (Facebook Watch); TIME’s Kid of the Year (Nickelodeon) |
| Outstanding Daytime Promotional Announcement | Outstanding Short Form Daytime Non-Fiction Program |
| **Jurassic World Camp Cretaceous – "Launch Campaign" (Netflix)** (Note: Winners: Michael Vollman (executive producer); Laura Carrillo (creative director); Rick Clifton (senior producer); Ryan Bradley, Seth Fowler (associate producers); Travis Young, Bryan Parill, Jesse Warshal (producers); Jeff Hinman, Rachel Parker, Joe Vallero (editors)); The Astronauts – "The Astronauts Launch" (Nickelodeon); The Drew Barrymore Show – "The Drew Barrymore Show" (Syndicated); Good Morning America – "Sunshine" (ABC); Kid of the Year – "Kid of the Year" (Nickelodeon); Kids’ Choice Awards – "2020 Kids' Choice Awards" (Nickelodeon) | **Prideland (PBS)**; 9 Months with Courteney Cox (Facebook Watch); Booktube (YouTube Originals); Fundamental. Gender Justice. No Exceptions. (YouTube Originals); Self-Evident (PBS) |

=== Performance and Hosting ===
| Outstanding Performance by a Lead Actor in a Daytime Fiction Program | Outstanding Performance by a Lead Actress in a Daytime Fiction Program |
|---|---|
| **Kristos Andrews as Pete Garrett on The Bay (Tubi)**; Gijs Blom as Prince Viridian on The Letter for the King (Netflix); Lawrence Hilton-Jacobs as Cameran Sanders on A House Divided (ALLBLk); Sean Kanan as Sam Stevens / Dr Pierce Hartley on Studio City (Amazon Prime Video); Mark Christopher Lawrence as Hector on $tack$ (YouTube.com) | **Karrueche Tran as Vivian Johnson-Garrett on The Bay (Tubi)**; Sarah Joy Brown as Laurie Smith on Studio City (Amazon Prime Video); Midori Francis as Lily on Dash & Lily (Netflix); Jade Harlow as Lianna Ramos on The Bay (Tubi); Sharon Lawrence as Miranda Cryer on The Gaze (Facebook Watch/YouTube) |
| Outstanding Performance by a Supporting Actor in a Daytime Fiction Program | Outstanding Performance by a Supporting Actress in a Daytime Fiction Program |
| **Mike Manning as Caleb McKinnon on The Bay (Tubi)**; Neil Crone as Mr. Leopold on Endlings (Hulu); Cheyenne Jackson as Caleb Covington on Julie and the Phantoms (Netflix); Eric Nelsen as Daniel Garrett on The Bay (Tubi); Tristan Rogers as Daniel DOC Smith on Studio City (Amazon Prime Video) | **Jodi Long as Mrs. Basil E on Dash & Lily (Netflix)**; Carolyn Hennesy as Gloria Winton on Studio City (Amazon Prime Video); Alicia Leigh Willis as Avery Garrett on The Bay (Tubi); Jacklyn Zeman as Sofia Madison on The Bay (Tubi); Tiffani Thiessen as Lori Mendoza on Alexa & Katie (Netflix) |
| Outstanding Younger Performer in a Daytime Fiction Program | Outstanding Guest Performer in a Daytime Fiction Program |
| **Chiara D'Ambrosio as Regan Sanders on The Bay (Tubi)**; Isaac Arellanes as Ruben Reyna on Ghostwriter (Apple TV+); Arista Arhin as Sam on Lockdown (YouTube.com); Bianca D'Ambrosio as Frankie Sanders on The Bay (Tubi); Madison Reyes as Julie on Julie and the Phantoms (Netflix); Amir Wilson as Tiuri on The Letter for the King (Netflix) | **Andy Serkis as Mayor of Mistrinaut on The Letter for the King (Netflix)**; Wanda Sykes as Noah's Mom on Noah's Arc: The 'Rona Chronicles (YouTube.com); Anna Maria Horsford as Jolene Hernandez on Studio City (Amazon Prime Video); Ronn Moss as Ronn Moss on Studio City (Amazon Prime Video); A Martinez as Nardo Ramos on The Bay (Tubi); Randy Wayne as Matthew Johnson on The Bay (Tubi) |
| Outstanding Performer in a Preschool Animated Program | Outstanding Performer in an Animated Program |
| **Mark Hamill as Vuli on Elena of Avalor: Coronation Day (Disney Channel)**; Eric Bauza as Fozzie on Muppet Babies (Disney Junior); Juliet Donenfeld as Sally Squirrel on Pete the Cat (Amazon Prime Video); Eric Jacobson as Grover on The Monster at the End of this Story: A Sesame Street Special (HBO Max); Eric Petersen as Ant’ney on Madagascar: A Little Wild (Hulu/Peacock); Patrick Warburton as Grand Macaw on Elena of Avalor: Coronation Day (Disney Channel) | **Parker Simmons as Mao Mao, King Snugglemagne, Slim Pigguns, Guard on Mao Mao: Heroes of Pure Heart (Cartoon Network)**; Eric Bauza as Bugs Bunny/Daffy Duck on Looney Tunes Cartoons (HBO Max); Tom Kenny as SpongeBob SquarePants on SpongeBob SquarePants (Nickelodeon); Tress MacNeille as Dot on Animaniacs (Hulu); Sir Jonathan Pryce as Grandpa Sid on Piney: The Lonesome Pine (Disney Junior/Disney Channel) |
| Outstanding Principal Performance in a Children’s Program | Outstanding Limited Performance in a Children’s Program |
| **Jace Chapman as Noah on The Healing Powers of Dude (Netflix)**; Emilie Cocquerel as Sandy on The New Legends of Monkey (Netflix); Ryan Dillon as Elmo on Sesame Street (HBO); Nathan Lovejoy as Principal Swift on Gabby Duran & the Unsittables (Disney Channel); Tyler Sanders as Leo on Just Add Magic: Mystery City (Amazon Prime Video) | **Lupita Nyong'o as Self – Storyteller on Bookmarks: Celebrating Black Voices: Lupita Nyong'o Reads Sulwe (Netflix)**; Jennifer Barnhart as Zoe, Charlie’s Mom, Maggie Cadabby on Sesame Street (HBO); Derek Gaines as Isaac Ice on Helpsters: Isaac Ice (Apple TV+); Alicia Silverstone as Elizabeth Thomas-Brewer on The Baby-Sitters Club (Netflix); Tom Wilson as Doug Reynolds on Sydney to the Max (Disney Channel) |
| Outstanding Younger Performer in a Children’s Program | Outstanding Daytime Program Host |
| **Sophie Grace as Kristy Thomas on The Baby-Sitters Club (Netflix)**; Issac Ryan Brown as Booker on Raven's Home (Disney Channel); Sky Katz as Tess on Raven's Home (Disney Channel); Navia Robinson as Nia on Raven's Home (Disney Channel); Christian J. Simon as Leo on Sydney to the Max (Disney Channel) | **Zac Efron – Down to Earth with Zac Efron (Netflix)**; Carly Ciarrocchi, Charlie Engelman – Weird but True! (National Geographic Kids); Jeff Corwin – Ocean Treks with Jeff Corwin (Syndicated); Dr. Sanjay Gupta, Erica Hill, Van Jones – CNN/Sesame Street Town Halls (CNN); Brandon McMillan – Lucky Dog with Brandon McMillan (CBS) |
Outstanding Daytime Talent in a Spanish Language Program
**Diego Luna – Pan y Circo (Amazon Prime Video)**; Guillermo Arduino – Encuentro (CNN en Español); Francisco Cáceres – Un Nuevo Día (Telemundo); Nicole Suarez – Un Nuevo Día (Telemundo); Alejandro Rodriguez – Suelta la Sopa (Telemundo)

=== Animation ===
Outstanding Individual Achievement in Animation
- **Baba Yaga – Kal Athannassov, Art Director (Baobab Studios)**
- **Here We Are: Notes for Living on Planet Earth – Anne Moth, 3D Animator (Apple TV+)**
- **Go! Go! Cory Carson – Mike Dutton, Set Designer (Netflix)**
- **Go! Go! Cory Carson – Chris Sasaki, Production Designer (Netflix)**
- **Jurassic World Camp Cretaceous – Zesung Kang, Director (Netflix)**
- **Animaniacs – Karl Hadrika, Storyboard Artist (Hulu)**

=== Art Direction ===
| Outstanding Art Direction/Set Decoration/Scenic Design for a Drama or Daytime Fiction Program | Outstanding Art Direction/Set Decoration/Scenic Design |
|---|---|
| **Endlings – Ron Stefaniuk and Jim Goodall (Hulu)**; Dash & Lily (Netflix); Ghostwriter (Apple TV+); The Letter for the King (Netflix); Trinkets (Netflix); #WASHED (Amazon Prime Video) | **Odd Squad – Amanda Vernuccio, Sean Moore, Stephen Depko, Darren Pickering (PBS)**; Craftopia (HBO Max); The Kelly Clarkson Show (Syndicated); The New Legends of Monkey (Netflix); Weird But True (National Geographic Kids) |

=== Casting ===
| Outstanding Casting for a Drama or Daytime Fiction Program | Outstanding Casting for a Live-Action Children’s Program |
|---|---|
| **General Hospital – Mark Teschner and Lisa Booth (ABC)**; Dash & Lily (Netflix); Days of Our Lives (NBC); Julie and the Phantoms (Netflix); Trinkets (Netflix) | **The Healing Powers of Dude – Amber Horn, Danielle Aufiero, Jackie Lind, Steven Tylor O'Connor (Netflix)**; All That (Nickelodeon); The Astronauts (Nickelodeon); Bunk'd (Disney Channel); Raven's Home (Disney Channel) |
Outstanding Casting for an Animated Program
**Elena of Avalor – Jennifer Trujillo, Tatiana Bull, David Wright (Disney Channel)**; Baba Yaga (Baobab Studios); Baby Shark's Big Show! (Nickelodeon); Bubble Guppies (Nickelodeon); Duck Tales (Disney XD)

=== Cinematography ===
Outstanding Cinematography
- **Tiny Creatures – Jonathan Jones (Netflix)**
  - The Baby-Sitters Club (Netflix)
  - Dash & Lily (Netflix)
  - Ghostwriter (Apple TV+)
  - The Letter for the King (Netflix)

=== Costume Design ===
| Outstanding Costume Design/Styling for a Drama or Daytime Fiction Program | Outstanding Costume Design/Styling |
|---|---|
| **Julie and the Phantoms – Soyon An, Eilidh McAllister (Netflix)**; Alexa & Katie (Netflix); Dash & Lily (Netflix); Days of Our Lives (NBC); Trinkets (Netflix) | **The Baby-Sitters Club – Cynthia Summers, Kelsey Chobotar, Sanchia Wong, Anthony Lewis, Daria Magnusson (Netflix)**; The Healing Powers of Dude (Netflix); Helpsters (Apple TV+); Odd Squad (PBS) |

=== Directing ===
| Outstanding Directing Team for a Single Camera Daytime Non-Fiction Program | Outstanding Directing Team for a Multiple Camera Daytime Non-Fiction Program |
|---|---|
| **Saluting Everyday Heroes – David McKenzie (Popstar! TV)**; Creators for Change on Girls’ Education with Michelle Obama (YouTube Originals); Eater's Guide to the World (Hulu); Fundamental. Gender Justice. No Exceptions. (YouTube Originals); I Am Patrick (CBN); Lucky Dog with Brandon McMillan (CBS) | **American Music Spotlight – Vincent Adam Paul (The Circle)**; 94th Annual Macy's Thanksgiving Day (NBC); CBS This Morning (CBS); Disney Parks Magical Christmas Day Parade (ABC); Space Launch Live: America Returns to Space (Discovery and Science Channel) |
| Outstanding Directing Team for a Daytime Fiction Program | Outstanding Directing Team for a Preschool, Children’s or Family Viewing Program |
| **The Letter for the King – Felix Thompson (Netflix)**; Ashley Garcia: Genius in Love (Netflix); Dash & Lily - Brad Silberling, Fred Savage, and Pamela Romanowsky (Netflix); Ghostwriter - Luke Matheny, Jonathan Judge, Stephen Reynolds, Melanie Orr and Mars Horodyski, (Apple TV+); Trinkets - Ayoka Chenzira (Netflix) | **Sesame Street – Ken Diego, Rick Fernandes, Shannon Flynn, Kimmy Gatewood, Jack Jameson, Benjamin Lehmann, Linda Mendoza (HBO)**; The Baby-Sitters Club - Lucia Aniello, Linda Mendoza, Luke Matheny, Andrew DeYoung, Heather Jack and Kimmy Gatewood (Netflix); Blue's Clues & You! - Vadim Kapridov, M.R. Horhager, Jennifer Sherman, Steve Wright, Jeremy Slutskin (Nickelodeon); Dino Dana - Stephen Reynolds and J.J. Johnson (Amazon Prime Video); Dino Dana The Movie - J.J. Johnson (Amazon Prime Video); The Healing Powers of Dude - Richie Keen, Yulin Kuang, John Fortenberry and Steven Tsuchida (Netflix); Helpsters - Melanie Orr, Benjamin Lehmann, Ryan McFaul, Richard Fernandes and Shannon Flynn (Apple TV+) |
| Outstanding Directing Team for a Preschool Animated Program | Outstanding Directing Team for a Daytime Animated Program |
| **Go! Go! Cory Carson – Alex Woo, Stanley Moore (Netflix)**; The Adventures of Paddington (Nickelodeon); Elinor Wonders Why (PBS); Stillwater (Apple TV+); Xavier Riddle and the Secret Museum (PBS) | **Baba Yaga – Eric Darnell, Mathias Chelebourg (Baobab Studios)**; DC Super Hero Girls (Cartoon Network); Here We Are: Notes for Living on Planet Earth (Apple TV+); Hilda (Netflix); Wonderful World of Mickey Mouse (Disney+) |
Outstanding Voice Directing for a Daytime Animated Series
**Animaniacs: Season 1 - Sara Jane Sherman (Hulu)**; Hilda: Season 2 - David Peacock (Netflix); The Mighty Ones: Season 1 - Sirena Irwin (Hulu/Peacock); SpongeBob SquarePants - Tom Kenny (Nickelodeon); Summer Camp Island: Seasons 2-3 - Kristi Reed (Cartoon Network)

=== Editing ===
| Outstanding Single Camera Editing | Outstanding Multiple Camera Editing |
|---|---|
| **The Letter for the King – Jesse Parker, Oral Ottey (Netflix)**; The At Home Pasta Series (YouTube.com); Eater's Guide to the World (Hulu); Giada at Home 2.0 (Food Network); Rock the Park (Syndicated); Trinkets (Netflix) | **Helpsters – Robert Arrucci, Beth Moran, Michelle Botticelli (Apple TV+)**; Disney Parks Magical Christmas Day Parade (ABC); The Good Road (PBS); Long Way Up (Apple TV+); Pan y Circo (Amazon Prime Video); Sesame Street (HBO); Trisha's Southern Kitchen (Food Network) |
| Outstanding Editing for a Preschool Animated Program | Outstanding Editing for a Daytime Animated Program |
| **Stillwater – Jill Calhoun, Jack Paulson (Apple TV+)**; Elena of Avalor – Sandra Powers, Jack Paulson, Mark Demiel, Russell Eaton, and James Bluma (Disney Channel); Go! Go! Cory Carson - T.M. Christopher and Greg Knowles (Netflix); Puppy Dog Pals - Brian Dawley (Disney Channel); Xavier Riddle and the Secret Museum - Shawn Rocca (PBS) | **Animaniacs – Ryan Burkhard, Mark Miller, Philip Malamuth (Hulu)**; **Hilda – John McKinnon (Netflix)**; Baba Yaga (Baobab Studios); Here We Are: Notes for Living on Planet Earth (Apple TV+); Looney Tunes Cartoons (HBO Max); Tales of Arcadia: Wizards (Netflix); Wonderful World of Mickey Mouse (Disney+) |
Outstanding Multiple Camera Editing for a Drama or Daytime Fiction Program
**Julie and the Phantoms – Don Brochu, Dan Krieger, Austin Andrews (Netflix)**; Ashley Garcia: Genius in Love – Stephen Prime (Netflix); The Gaze - Joey Scoma (Facebook Watch, YouTube)

=== Main Title Design ===
| Outstanding Main Title and Graphic Design for a Live-Action Program | Outstanding Main Title for an Animated Program |
|---|---|
| **Dear Class of 2020 – Neil Harris, Tom Hodgkinson (YouTube Originals)**; Dino Dana The Movie (Amazon Prime Video); The Drew Barrymore Show (Syndicated); Mo Willems and the Storytime All-Stars Present: Don’t Let the Pigeon Do Storytime! (HBO Max); The Talk (CBS) | **Tales of Arcadia: Wizards – Francisco Ruiz Velasco, Alfonso Blaas, Yingjue Linda Chen, Brandon Tyra, Greg Lev, Igor Lodeiro, Jonatan Catalan Navarrete (Netflix)**; Madagascar: A Little Wild (Hulu/Peacock); Octonauts and the Caves of Sac Actun (Netflix); The Owl House (Disney Channel); Summer Camp Island (Cartoon Network) |

=== Hairstyling ===
| Outstanding Hairstyling for a Drama or Daytime Fiction Program | Outstanding Hairstyling |
|---|---|
| **The Letter for the King – Frances Hounsom (Netflix)**; Dash & Lily (Netflix); Ghostwriter (Apple TV+); Julie and the Phantoms (Netflix); Trinkets (Netflix) | **The Real – Roberta Gardener-Rogers, Ray Dodson, Noogie Thai, Rachel Mason, Robear Landeros, Vickie Mynes, Angela Stevens (Syndicated)**; The Big Fib (Disney+); Red Table Talk (Facebook Watch); The Talk (CBS); The Wendy Williams Show (Syndicated) |

=== Lighting Direction ===
| Outstanding Lighting Direction for a Drama or Daytime Fiction Program | Outstanding Lighting Direction |
|---|---|
| **Studio City – Pablo Diez (Amazon Prime Video)**; The Bold and the Beautiful (CBS); Endlings (Hulu); Ghostwriter (Apple TV+); Trinkets (Netflix); The Young and the Restless (CBS) | **Odd Squad – Gayle Ye (PBS)**; The Ellen DeGeneres Show (Syndicated); The Kelly Clarkson Show (Syndicated); Sesame Street (HBO); The Talk (CBS) |

=== Makeup ===
| Outstanding Makeup for a Drama or Daytime Fiction Program | Outstanding Makeup |
|---|---|
| **Dash & Lily – Liz Coakley, Jacqueline Bensaid, Rebecca Levine (Netflix)**; Julie and the Phantoms (Netflix); The Letter for the King (Netflix); Trinkets (Netflix); The Young and the Restless (CBS) | **The Real – Melanie Mills, Glen Alen, Motoko Clayton, Julie Jules (Syndicated)**; All That (Nickelodeon); Red Table Talk (Facebook Watch); The Talk (CBS); The Wendy Williams Show (Syndicated) |

=== Music ===
| Outstanding Music Direction and Composition for a Daytime Program | Outstanding Music Direction and Composition for a Preschool, Children’s or Animated Program |
|---|---|
| **The Letter for the King – Brandon Campbell (Netflix)**; Dash & Lily (Netflix); Endlings (Hulu); Ghostwriter (Apple TV+); I Am Patrick (CBN) | **The Tom & Jerry Show – Vivek Maddala, Steven Morrell (Boomerang)**; Animaniacs (Hulu); Elena of Avalor (Disney Channel); Rapunzel's Tangled Adventure (Disney Channel); Star Wars: The Clone Wars (Disney+) |
| Outstanding Original Song | Outstanding Original Song for a Preschool, Children’s or Animated Program |
| **Julie and the Phantoms (Song: "Unsaid Emily") – Michelle Lewis and Dan Petty (Netflix)**; The Kelly Clarkson Show (Song: "Cabana Boy Troy") (Syndicated); The Young and the Restless (Song: "More Than a Vow") (CBS); Julie and the Phantoms (Song: "I Got the Music") (Netflix); Julie and the Phantoms (Song: "The Other Side of Hollywood") (Netflix) | **Animaniacs (Song: "Suffragette Song") – Jess Lacher, Andrew Barbot, Roderick Hart, Thomas Reilly (Hulu)**; Adventure Time: Distant Lands – "Obsidian" (Song: "Monster") (HBO Max); Rapunzel's Tangled Adventure (Song: "Nothing Left To Lose") (Disney Channel); Elena of Avalor (Song: "Something in the Air") (Disney Channel); Phineas and Ferb the Movie: Candace Against the Universe (Song: "Such a Beautiful Day") (Disney+) |

=== Technical Direction ===
| Outstanding Technical Team for a Drama or Daytime Fiction Program | Outstanding Technical Team |
|---|---|
| **General Hospital – Kevin Carr, Chuck Abate, Craig Camou, Barbara Langdon, Dean Cosanella, Vicki Walker, Antonio Simone (ABC)**; The Bold and the Beautiful (CBS); Days of Our Lives (NBC); The Young and the Restless (CBS) | **Sesame Street – Tom Guadarrama, James Meek, Frank Biondi, Jerry Cancel, Shaun Harkins, Mark Britt (HBO)**; Ashley Garcia: Genius in Love (Netflix); CBS This Morning (CBS); Space Launch Live: America Returns to Space (Discovery and Science Channel); The Talk (CBS); Wheel of Fortune (Syndicated) |

=== Sound ===
| Outstanding Sound Mixing and Editing for a Drama or Daytime Fiction Program | Outstanding Live and Direct-to-Tape Sound Mixing |
|---|---|
| **The Letter for the King – Howard Bargroff (Netflix)**; Endlings (Hulu); Ghostwriter (Apple TV+); Trinkets (Netflix) | **The Kelly Clarkson Show – James Slanger, Bob Lewis, Eddie Marquez, Robert Venable (Syndicated)**; Family Feud (Syndicated); Let’s Make a Deal (CBS); Tamron Hall (Syndicated); The View (ABC) |
| Outstanding Sound Mixing and Sound Editing for a Preschool Animated Program | Outstanding Sound Mixing and Sound Editing for a Daytime Animated Program |
| **Dragons Rescue Riders: Secrets of the Songwing – Otis Van Osten, Jay Culliton, Josh Johnson, Mishelle Fordham, Jason Oliver, Gouen Lee (Netflix)**; Elena of Avalor (Disney Channel); Let's Go Luna! (PBS); Mickey Mouse Mixed-Up Adventures (Disney Channel); The Monster at the End of this Story: A Sesame Street Special (HBO Max); Muppet Babies (Disney Junior) | **Star Wars: The Clone Wars – Matthew Wood, David Acord, Kimberly Patrick, James Spencer, Danielle Dupre, Frank Rinella, Jason Butler, Andrea Gard, Margie O'Malley, Peter Lam, Cameron Davis, Brian Frank, Tony Diaz, Carlos Sotolongo (Disney+)**; Angela's Christmas Wish (Netflix); Fast & Furious: Spy Racers (Netflix); Here We Are: Notes for Living on Planet Earth (Apple TV+); Lego DC Shazam! Magic and Monsters (Warner Bros.); Tales of Arcadia: Wizards (Netflix) |
Outstanding Sound Mixing and Editing
**The New Legends of Monkey – Luke Mynott, Melanie Graham, Wes Chew, Richard Flynn, Michael Newton, Cihan Saral, Dylan Barfield, Tania Vlassova, Julian Wessels, Sam Rogers, Ryan Squires, Evan McHugh (Netflix)**; Julie and the Phantoms (Netflix); Life 2.0 (Syndicated); Long Way Up (Apple TV+); Xploration Outer Space (Syndicated)

=== Special Effects ===
Outstanding Special Effects Costumes, Makeup and Hairstyling
- **Aliens Stole My Body – Todd Masters, Paige Yeoman, Bonny Bahry, Amelia Smart, Quinn Heinrichs, Mariana Fernandez, Harriet Sales, Sung Hoon (Brian) Kim, Caitlin Carmichael, Alex Roseberry, James Skuse, Sarah Pickersgill, Jason Ward, Luke Stalker Switzer, Lori Sandnes, Jeannie Satterthwaite, Brad Proctor, Josh Raymond, Yukiyo Okajima, Arwen Hargreaves, Amanda Duff, Chris Devitt, Anna Dalmau Forcano, Jon Berezan (Universal Pictures)**
  - All That (Nickelodeon)
  - The Drew Barrymore Show (Syndicated)
  - The Healing Powers of Dude (Netflix)
  - The Letter for the King (Netflix)
  - Sesame Street (HBO)

=== Writing ===
| Outstanding Writing Team for a Daytime Non-Fiction Series | Outstanding Writing Team for a Daytime Non-Fiction Special |
|---|---|
| **Xploration Outer Space – Matt Gibson (Syndicated)**; The Henry Ford's Innovation Nation (CBS); Life 2.0 (Syndicated); Lucky Dog with Brandon McMillan (CBS); This Old House (PBS); Rock the Park (Syndicated) | **2020 Film Independent Spirit Awards – John T Reynolds, Benji Aflalo, Neil Casey, Jess Dweck, John Glaser, Joe Mande, Bonnie McFarlane, Eliza Skinner, David Wild (IFC)**; **Jeopardy! The Greatest of All Time – Harry Friedman, Billy Wisse, Michele Loud, Debbie Griffin, Jim Rhine, Mark Gaberman, John Duarte, Robert McClenaghan, Matt Caruso (ABC)**; 94th Annual Macy’s Thanksgiving Day (NBC); I Am Patrick (CBN); Tournament of Roses Parade (NBC) |
| Outstanding Writing Team for a Daytime Fiction Program | Outstanding Writing Team for a Preschool, Children’s or Family Viewing Program |
| **Dash & Lily – Joe Tracz, Carol Barbee, Lauren Moon, Harry Tarre, Rachel Cohn (Netflix)**; The Bay (Tubi); Ghostwriter (Apple TV+); Julie and the Phantoms (Netflix); Stuck with You (UMC) | **The Power of We: A Sesame Street Special – Geri Cole (HBO Max)**; The Baby-Sitters Club (Netflix); Blue's Clues & You! (Nickelodeon); Just Add Magic: Mystery City (Amazon Prime Video); Nick News (Nickelodeon); Sesame Street (HBO) |
| Outstanding Writing for a Preschool Animated Program | Outstanding Writing Team for a Daytime Animated Program |
| **The Adventures of Paddington – Jon Foster, James Lamont (Nickelodeon)**; Doc McStuffins (Disney Junior); Elena of Avalor (Disney Channel); Octonauts & the Great Barrier Reef (Netflix); Stillwater (Apple TV+); Trash Truck (Netflix) | **Phineas and Ferb the Movie: Candace Against the Universe – Dan Povenmire, Jeff "Swampy" Marsh, Jon Colton Barry, Jim Bernstein, Joshua Pruett, Kate Kondell, Jeffrey M. Howard, Bob BowenBob Bowen (Disney+)**; Adventure Time: Distant Lands – "Obsidian" (HBO Max); Big City Greens (Disney Channel); Hilda (Netflix); Star Wars: The Clone Wars (Disney+) |

=== Chairman's Award ===
NATAS Chairman Terry O'Reilly presented the Crystal Pillar Chairman's Award to 16 daytime television professionals who "envisioned and implemented procedures that made safe production of media possible during the COVID pandemic." The award inscription reads: "For distinguished leadership in seeking to assure the health and safety of our television industry colleagues during the COVID-19 pandemic".

| Name | Title | Production/Organization |
|---|---|---|
| Piper Acord | Associate Producer | Jeopardy |
| Taska Carrigan | Senior Vice President, Production Operations, Management & Legal | Sesame Workshop |
| Rich Cervini | Executive Vice President, Programming and Production | CBS Media Ventures |
| Vinnie Fusco | Vice President and General Manager | Stamford Media Center Productions |
| Toni Gray | Executive in Charge | Let's Make a Deal |
| Barry Ilovich | President of Production | Entertainment Studios |
| Nina Lagrimas | Health and Safety Supervisor | Days of Our Lives |
| Precious V. Mayes | Executive Producer | The Bay |
| Christy Myers | Travel Coordinator | Wheel of Fortune |
| Laurie Rich | Co-Executive Producer/Executive in Charge | The Dr. Oz Show |
| Rob Rosellen | Production Manager | Access Hollywood |
| Tom Rotolo | Senior Production Manager | General Hospital |
| Kayla Taylor | Receptionist | The Young and the Restless |
| Allison Vanore | Producer/Director | The After Forever Group |
| Ann Willmott | Line Producer | The Bold and the Beautiful |
| Timothy Woodward Jr. | Executive Producer | Studio City |
