= Mr. Pig =

- Film poster
- Directed by: Diego Luna
- Written by: Diego Luna; Augusto Mendoza
- Produced by: Pablo Cruz; Diego Luna
- Starring: Danny Glover; Maya Rudolph; José María Yazpik; Joel Murray
- Cinematography: Damian Garcia
- Edited by: Douglas Crise
- Music by: Camilo Froideval
- Production company: Canana Films
- Release dates: January 26, 2016 (Sundance Film Festival); July 22, 2016 (Mexico)
- Running time: 95 minutes
- Country: Mexico
- Language: English

Mr. Pig is a 2016 Mexican English-language drama film directed by Diego Luna and written by Diego Luna and Augusto Mendoza. The film stars Danny Glover, Maya Rudolph, José María Yazpik and Joel Murray.

== Cast ==
- Danny Glover as Ambrose
- Maya Rudolph as Eunice
- José María Yazpik as Payo
- Joel Murray as Gringo
- Angélica Aragón as Chila
- Gabriela Araujo as Brianda
- Paulino Partida as Ermilo
- Juan Pablo Medina as Customs Agent
- Alejandro Luna as Doctor

== Release ==
The film premiered at the 2016 Sundance Film Festival on January 26, 2016.
