= Glenn McCuen =

American actor, model and former gymnast (born 1991)

- Born: February 3, 1991 (age 35); Baton Rouge, Louisiana, U.S.
- Occupations: Actor, model, gymnast
- Years active: Gymnast: 1999–2008; Actor: 2005–present

External image
- Glenn McCuen IMDb photo

Glenn McCuen (born February 3, 1991) is an American actor, model and former gymnast, best known for his supporting role as Bodie in the 2010 family film Marmaduke, and for his starring role as the narcissistic surfer, Aloe on the Nickelodeon teen sitcom, Bucket & Skinner's Epic Adventures.

== Early life ==
Glenn McCuen was born on February 3, 1991, in Baton Rouge, Louisiana, to parents Glenn McCuen and Kathy Authement-McCuen. Raised in Houma, Louisiana, with his older sister, Courtney, McCuen attended Lisa Park Elementary and was active in karate until the age of eight, when he decided to follow in his older sister's footsteps and began taking gymnastics. McCuen showed a talent for gymnastics and trained at Jennings Gymnastics in Schriever, Louisiana, until, at the age of ten, the family sold everything they owned and made the move to Plano, Texas, so that he could train at the World Olympic Gymnastics Academy (WOGA).

== Career ==
=== Gymnast ===
In 2001, at the age of 10, McCuen began his WOGA training in Plano, Texas. Balancing his schoolwork and training seven hours a day in the gym under the tutelage of gymnastics coach Sergei Pakanich, McCuen quickly moved up the ranks, placing 8th in the country at the U.S. National Gymnastics Championships in the 14-15 division in 2007, and winning the Texas State Gymnastics Competition in 2008. McCuen told journalist Dave Walker of The Times-Picayune of his aspirations as a gymnast - "I had a dream. I wanted to go the Olympics and get a gold medal." However, in the fall of 2008, at the age of 17, McCuen suffered a serious back injury that forced him to take a year off from his training, effectively putting an end to his dreams of Olympic gold.

=== Actor and model ===
In 2005, at the age of 14, McCuen began his acting career when a talent scout contacted the gym where he was training looking for a boy who could do a flip for a lightsaber toy commercial. He auditioned for the commercial and got the part, and it was then that he discovered he had a passion for acting and modeling. In the subsequent years, McCuen modeled for famed photographer Bruce Weber and appeared in advertorial campaigns for Abercrombie Kids, Dillard's, JCPenney, and Neiman Marcus, among others.

In 2006, McCuen began attending Cathryn Sullivan's Acting for Film school in Lewisville, Texas, and in 2008, after an injury that put an end to his Olympic training, decided to explore the possibilities of a full-time career in entertainment. McCuen graduated early from Plano High School and just one week before his 18th birthday, moved to Los Angeles to pursue an acting career. In early 2009, he was introduced to a talent agent at a party, and within a week, he had representation. That same year, McCuen began studying acting at the Michael Woolson Studio, and in 2010, began studying acting at the Ivana Chubbuck Studio.

McCuen landed his first film role in the 2010 independent movie A Bag of Hammers, and was next cast as Bodie, the heart-throb surfer opposite Caroline Sunshine in the 2010 motion picture Marmaduke. After first filming a pilot for Nickelodeon, McCuen next auditioned for a role on the Nickelodeon series Big Time Rush. Although he didn’t get the part, he was asked back a few days later to read for another new Nickelodeon series, the tween-targeted kids comedy, Bucket & Skinner's Epic Adventures. McCuen landed the role and in July 2011, the series premiered on Nickelodeon. On the show, McCuen plays John "Aloe" Aloysius, an egotistical teenage "golden boy" surfer who serves as the antagonist to the titular duo, played by Taylor Gray and Dillon Lane respectively.

== Personal life ==
McCuen currently lives in Los Angeles, but says he still considers Louisiana home and enjoys going back to visit family who still reside there. His hobbies include martial arts, wrestling, surfing and dancing, as well as playing guitar and piano. He has also expressed an interest in a career off-screen and has been quoted as saying - "I love multitasking. I love writing. I love directing. I feel like I have a vision for it. I know exactly where things should go and how people should move. I’m definitely going to pursue directing when the time comes."

McCuen also devotes his time to various charities including "Let Them Play" which is dedicated to providing underprivileged children the opportunity to play organized sports, and "First Star" which is dedicated to improving the lives of child victims of abuse and neglect.

== Filmography ==
Film
Year	Film	Role	Notes
2010	Marmaduke	Bodie	
2013	Dean Slater: Resident Advisor	Cory Burton	
2014	Helicopter Mom	Mitchell	
2019	Hot Water	Billy Burnett	
2021	The Space Between	Todd	
Television
Year	Show	Role	Notes
2010	Big Time Rush	Lil Lee Roth	Episode: Welcome Back, Big Time
2011–2013	Bucket & Skinner's Epic Adventures	John "Aloe" Aloysius	Main role
2013	Supah Ninjas	Trip Taylor	Episode: Finding Forster
2013	Marvin Marvin	Snake	Episode: Marvin and the Cool Kids
2014	Teen Wolf	Sean Walcott	Episode: Muted
2015	Kirby Buckets	Carver	Episode: Kick the Buckets
2020	Good Trouble	Chase	Episode: "Gumboot Becky"
2020	Dash & Lily	Edgar	
