= Bucket & Skinner's Epic Adventures =

American teen sitcom

- Genre: Teen sitcom
- Created by: Boyce Bugliari; Jamie McLaughlin
- Starring: Taylor Gray; Dillon Lane; Ashley Argota; Tiffany Espensen; Glenn McCuen; George Back
- Theme music composer: Michael Corcoran; Nick Hexum; Zack Hexum
- Opening theme: "No Worries" by Taylor Gray and Dillon Lane
- Composer: Nick Pierone
- Country of origin: United States
- Original language: English
- No. of seasons: 1
- No. of episodes: 26

Production
- Executive producers: Thomas W. Lynch; Boyce Bugliari; Jamie McLaughlin; Jonathan Stark
- Production locations: Pacific Bluffs, California (setting); Sunset Bronson Studios, Los Angeles, California (filming location)
- Camera setup: Videotape (Filmized); Multi-camera
- Running time: 23–24 minutes (approx.)
- Production companies: Tom Lynch Company Studios; Bugliari/McLaughlin Productions; Nickelodeon Productions

Original release
- Network: Nickelodeon (2011–2012); TeenNick (2012–2013)
- Release: July 1, 2011 – May 1, 2013

Bucket & Skinner's Epic Adventures is an American teen sitcom. The series aired on Nickelodeon from July 1, 2011 until June 9, 2012. The remaining episodes of the series were broadcast on TeenNick from December 22, 2012, to May 1, 2013.

== Premise ==
The series follows two friends from the fictional California town of Pacific Bluffs. Often, the boys act quite impetuously leading them to multiple conflicts.

== Characters ==
=== Main ===
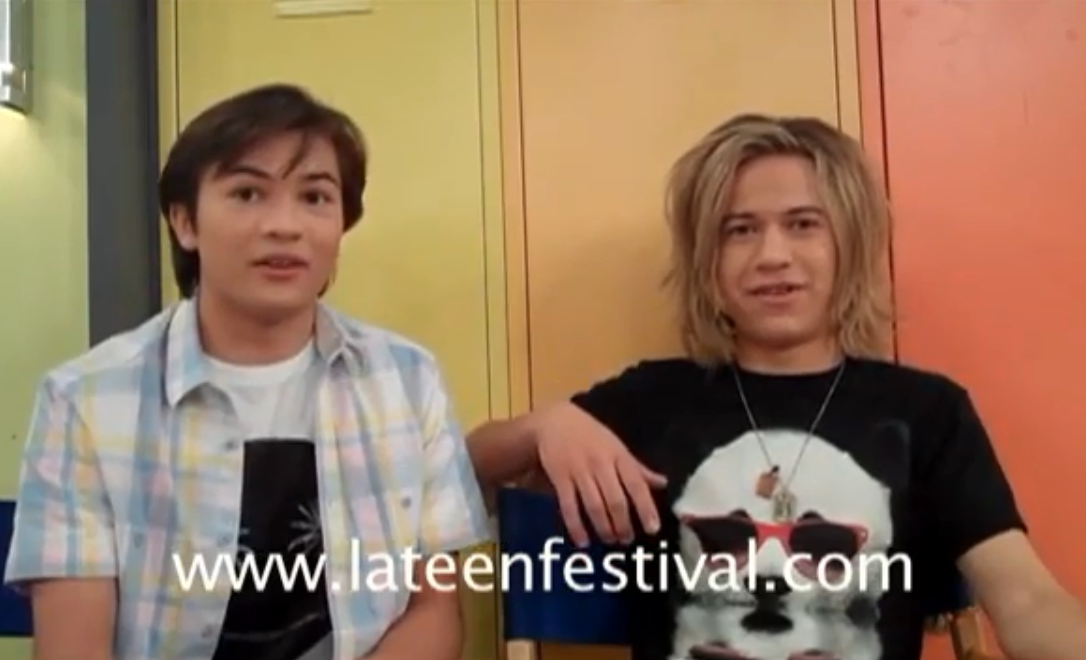
Taylor Gray (left) and Dillon Lane (right), portrayed Bucket & Skinner in the series

- Bucket (Taylor Gray) is a freshman in high school. He is Skinner's best friend. He spends his time surfing and trying to impress Kelly, his crush. His main competitor for Kelly's affections is Aloe. Aloe dislikes Bucket because he cut him off his board when he was five. He is Three Pieces's nephew. He is shown to be slightly smarter than Skinner and a bit more realistic.
- Skinner (Dillon Lane) is Bucket's best friend and an avid surfer. He is not very bright and his desire for epic adventures often get the two of them into difficult situations. In the episode "Epic Musical" it is shown that he has a photographic memory, and in the episode "Epic Escape" it is shown that he is a very skilled ventriloquist.
- Kelly (Ashley Argota) is a great surfer. She works part-time at a surf shop and is the object of Bucket's affections. However, she does not seem to notice. In the episode "Epic Jobs", she was working as a junior lifeguard with Aloe.
- Piper (Tiffany Espensen) is Kelly's smart younger sister. She uses her wits to get what she wants by coming up with various sneaky plans. She has a crush on Skinner, but she hates Bucket for an unknown reason. She also helps Three Pieces with many of his problems.
- John "Aloe" Aloysius (Glenn McCuen) is Bucket's arch-rival. He uses his money and popularity to embarrass Bucket and Skinner whenever he gets the chance. He is almost always accompanied by a student named Sven. He is very muscular, he has amazing pecs and abs. Aloe seems to like ribbon dancing as shown in "Epic Dancer". He is the captain of the varsity surf team. He has an 8-year-old brother, as mentioned in "Epic Girls". He also has feelings for Kelly.
- Three Pieces (George Back) is Bucket's uncle and the owner of the local surf shop. He is a former surf champion and is always trying to impress the ladies. In the episode "Epic Dancer", it revealed that he got his nickname after his surfboard broke into three pieces while he was surfing a big wave. He is friends with all of Bucket's friends. In "Epic Musical", he shows himself to be a great singer.

=== Recurring ===
- Sven (D.C. Cody) is Aloe's best friend. He is not very bright and possibly nicer than Aloe but does whatever he asks of him including embarrassing Bucket and Skinner.
- Blake Dunkirk (Bryan Craig) is Kelly's boyfriend. He is a jock.

== Broadcast ==
Bucket & Skinner's Epic Adventures premiered on Nickelodeon on July 1, 2011, with the show then going on a 5-month hiatus before being cancelled. The series was rolled out to the Canadian network, Nickelodeon (Canada) on September 10, 2011. Nickelodeon (Greece) started airing it on September 7, 2012. It was announced at the Children's Media Conference 2012 that Nickelodeon (UK and Ireland) would premiere the series on September 3, 2012. It was announced in late 2012 that Nickelodeon (Germany), Nickelodeon (France), Nickelodeon (Italy), and Nickelodeon (Latin America) would also be premiering the series in September 2012. It was announced that Bucket & Skinner's Epic Adventures would air in October 2012 on Nickelodeon Australia. These countries have shown episodes that have not aired in the United States until much later.

=== Cancellation ===
Ashley Argota reported on July 5, 2012, that Nickelodeon had cancelled the show with several episodes yet to air in the United States; however in other countries, all episodes were broadcast, and in the United States the series was moved to TeenNick from late-2012 through mid-2013.

== Episodes ==
No.	Title	Directed by	Written by	Original release date	Prod. code	U.S. viewers (millions)
Nickelodeon
1	"Epic Election"	Leonard R. Garner, Jr.	Boyce Bugliari & Jamie McLaughlin	July 1, 2011	103	1.9
Bucket (Taylor Gray) runs for class president to impress Kelly (Ashley Argota). But he needs help to win it because he is not as popular as Aloe (Glenn McCuen) who is also running. Piper (Tiffany Espensen) suggests they start rumors that Bucket and Kelly are dating to help him win.
2	"Epic Girls"	Leonard R. Garner, Jr.	Boyce Bugliari & Jamie McLaughlin	July 1, 2011	102	1.6
Bucket and Skinner sneak into Aloe's party disguised as girls named Lady Gaga (Bucket) and Beyoncé (Skinner) but they forget to bring a change of clothes and Sven likes Beyoncé. So they try to get into Aloe's room to get clothes. Meanwhile, Piper tries to expose the surf shop's supplier who is selling Three Pieces (George Back) faulty merchandise.
3	"Epic Jobs"	Roger Christiansen	Boyce Bugliari & Jamie McLaughlin	July 2, 2011	104	2.6
After accidentally destroying Kelly's boat, Bucket and Skinner must get jobs to raise money and fix it. Piper is able to get them jobs at Taco, Taco, Taco dressed in costumes for advertisement. Meanwhile, Kelly begins to work as a lifeguard with Aloe and finds him a bit weird. Absent: George Back as Three Pieces
4	"Epic Brains"	Leonard R. Garner, Jr.	Harry Hannigan & Shawn Simmons	July 3, 2011	101	1.8
Due to a paper mix up after a test, Bucket and Skinner are accidentally put in a gifted class. Bucket decides to tell the teacher that gave them the test about the problem, but he and Skinner learn from Piper that students in gifted classes get out of school at noon. So now they decide to stay in the class. Aloe finds out and tells their teacher that they built an engine and the teacher suggests they display it at the science fair. So now the boys have to try to make one to stay in the class. Meanwhile, Piper gets a B on a test and gets angry at the teacher and attempts to sue him but Kelly steps in to defend him. Absent: George Back as Three Pieces
5	"Epic Dancer"	Roger Christiansen	May Chan & Elliott Owen	July 10, 2011	105	2.3
Bucket is jealous when he learns that Kelly is going to the school dance with a popular senior he thinks is a jerk. As he and Skinner try to sabotage her date’s efforts to impress Kelly, they start to wonder if he's not as bad as they thought.
6	"Epic Musical"	Mark Cendrowski	Boyce Bugliari & Jamie McLaughlin	July 15, 2011	110	2.7
Bucket auditions for the lead in the school musical so he can kiss Kelly while Skinner auditions to be a talking tree. Aloe ends up getting Bucket's part instead due to his father making a large donation to the theatre. Meanwhile, Three Pieces agrees to help Piper sound good singing in the musical using voice enhancement technology. Guest star: Patrick Bristow as Mr. St. Troy
7	"Epic Rockstar"	Roger Christiansen	May Chan & Elliott Owen	July 22, 2011	112	1.5
Sara Bareilles returns to her hometown of Pacific Bluffs (where Bucket and Skinner live) to hold a song writing contest. The winning song will be featured on Sara's next album. Bucket & Skinner enter the contest and win, but when Bucket realizes he accidentally submitted the love song called Lady Brown Hair (brown hair, referring to Kelly when it was really supposed to be "Soap" the soap song). Bucket and Skinner must scramble to get the song back from Sara. Piper is forced to be nice to Bucket for a week, so she helps, but when she has one last step and plan, her time is up. (Note: this is the episode where Bucket has decided to admit his feelings for Kelly). Absent: George Back as Three Pieces
8	"Epic Escape"	Leonard R. Garner, Jr.	Harry Hannigan & Shawn Simmons	July 30, 2011	108	2.4
Skinner gets detention on a major surfing day, and Bucket tries to get detention also, only to get thanked every time. Kelly accidentally trips and rips a teacher's vest, getting her detention. Bucket gets detention, but with the nasty nurse supervising, they have to get out. Meanwhile, Aloe gets hit on the head with a surfboard and thinks that he is Sven's assistant so Sven decides to boss him around for a while until he gets hit with another surfboard, and Piper tries to get a legitimate excuse for gym class but after being scared by the nurse, she loses her street cred and must find a way to get it back. Absent: George Back as Three Pieces
9	"Epic Wingman"	Leonard R. Garner, Jr.	Boyce Bugliari & Jamie McLaughlin	August 13, 2011	109	2.8
Aloe talks Bucket into being his wingman on a double date with two seniors, but the partnership quickly turns into a battle of wills as the guys try to one-up each other to impress the girls. Piper, banned from the prestigious spelling bee for her past aggressive behavior, ropes Skinner into competing for her. Absent: George Back as Three Pieces
10	"Epic Babysitters"	Lynn McCracken	Harry Hannigan & Shawn Simmons	September 16, 2011	115	2.4
Kelly has won concert tickets and offers to take Bucket & Skinner, under the condition they babysit for Piper. The boys agree to babysit but quickly realize this job is way more than they bargained for. Absent: George Back as Three Pieces
11	"Epic Bobo"	Roger Christiansen	Boyce Bugliari & Jamie McLaughlin	September 23, 2011	113	1.5
Aloe offers Bucket a spot on the varsity surf team, but in exchange he wants to borrow Bobo, Three Piece's prized surfboard. After Aloe accidentally breaks Bobo, Bucket along with Skinner, Aloe and Sven, must get rid of the evidence and cover up their involvement before Three Pieces finds out.
12	"Epic Takeover"	Roger Christiansen	Harry Hannigan & Shawn Simmons	September 30, 2011	106	1.9
Three Pieces leaves to go on a camping trip and Aloe takes over the surf shop due to a one-day-late rent. Skinner must surf against him in a competition to get the shop back, but his ankle gets sprained. Now, its up to Bucket to save the day.
13	"Epic Dates"	Trevor Kirschner	May Chan & Elliott Owen	October 7, 2011	111	1.7
The boys are feeling down since Skinner has an ear infection preventing him from surfing, and Bucket is annoyed that Blake & Kelly's relationship is going so well. To get their minds off their troubles the guys venture into the dating world. Before they know it both they each meet a girl they like, but the guys soon realize they're dating the same girl, CJ (Samantha Boscarino). Since neither one wants to give up their dates the boys decide to hold a date-off and see which guy the girl picks. Absent: George Back as Three Pieces Guest star: Samantha Boscarino as CJ
14	"Epic Cuffs"	Roger Christiansen	Harry Hannigan & Shawn Simmons	March 17, 2012	120	N/A
Talent show rehearsal for their magic act goes awry when Bucket and Skinner accidentally handcuff themselves to Kelly. Unable to free themselves, the three do their best to make it through Kelly's stuffy dinner party with her boyfriend's parents without revealing anything is wrong. Also, when Piper is promoted to a senior high science class, she discovers Aloe is her new lab partner. Absent: George Back as Three Pieces
15	"Epic Crashers"	Jonathan Weiss	Boyce Bugliari & Jamie McLaughlin	March 24, 2012	124	1.6
Skinner falls for a rich heiress (Halston Sage) after the boys sneak into an elite yacht club and Bucket helps him act wealthy and cultured so she doesn't learn the truth about him. Aloe is determined to expose Skinner at the club’s formal ball. A grounded Kelly and Piper sneak out of the house and end up winning a contest at the taco shop, but must enlist the help of “Nana” Three Pieces when a parent’s signature is required to claim the prize.
16	"Epic Haunting"	Gil Junger	May Chan & Elliott Owen	April 28, 2012	118	1.6
Bucket and Skinner's latest plan to achieve epic status requires them to spend the whole night in the town's legendary haunted house. They immediately face one terrifying chill after another, until they discover that a jealous Aloe is behind the whole thing. But when the scares continue even after Aloe's plan is revealed, all the guys face their fear that the house may actually be haunted. Note: This episode was originally scheduled to air on October 29, 2011. This episode premiered on October 27, 2012 on Nickelodeon (UK & Ireland). Absent: George Back as Three Pieces
17 18	"Epic Break-Up"	Roger Christiansen	Boyce Bugliari & Jamie McLaughlin	June 9, 2012	125 & 126	1.5
Bucket & Skinner head to a rock festival on the wrong bus and accidentally enter a military facility. Elsewhere, Kelly's prom plans go astray when her old childhood pal shows up and Piper ruins her dress. Note: This 1 hour special aired as part of "Just Jennette Night" along with new episodes of iCarly and Victorious, all featuring Jennette McCurdy. Also Ashley Argota and Matt Shively get to work together again since they last worked on True Jackson, VP. It was the final episode to premiere on Nickelodeon in the United States. Special guest stars: Jennette McCurdy, Patrick Gallagher, Cody Simpson, and Matt Shively.
TeenNick
19	"Epic Christmas"	Victor Gonzalez	Boyce Bugliari & Jamie McLaughlin	December 22, 2012	121	N/A
Bucket is upset because this Christmas in Pacific Bluffs it won't have any snow, but after a Christmas Carol parody, he learns the true meaning of Christmas. Note 1: Episodes 19–26 would air on TeenNick in the United States. This episode was originally scheduled to air on December 17, 2011 on Nickelodeon. Note 2: This episode aired on Nickelodeon Greece on 27 September 2012, on Nickelodeon UK & Ireland on 15 December 2012 and on Nickelodeon Latin America on 17 December 2012.
20	"Epic Crush"	Roger Christiansen	Boyce Bugliari & Jamie McLaughlin	March 27, 2013	114	N/A
Bucket recognizes his new classmate as a girl from camp who was obsessed with him, and he fears she now wants revenge. Note 1: This episode was originally scheduled to air on October 14, 2011. Note 2: This episode premiered on Nickelodeon Latin America and on Nickelodeon Greece on 20 September 2012 and on Nickelodeon Netherlands on 2 November 2012.
21	"Epic Copycat"	Mark Gendrowski	Andrew Farrote	April 3, 2013	117	N/A
A girl doesn't like Aloe and likes Bucket, so Aloe starts acting like Bucket. Note: This episode premiered on Nickelodeon Greece on 23 September 2012 and on Nickelodeon Latin America on 25 September 2012.
22	"Epic Chicken"	Leonard R. Garner, Jr.	Boyce Bugliari & Jamie McLaughlin	April 10, 2013	107	N/A
Bucket's crippling fear of chickens embarrasses him when one gets loose at school and he totally loses his cool in front of Kelly. In an attempt to prove he isn't a wimp, he and Skinner stage a fake robbery at the surf shop. Things, however, don't go according to plan. Note: This episode premiered on Nickelodeon Latin America on 10 September 2012, on Nickelodeon Greece on 13 September 2012 and on Nickelodeon UK & Ireland on 18 September 2012.
23	"Epic Cheer"	Victor Gonzalez	May Chan & Elliott Owen	April 17, 2013	122	N/A
Bucket and Skinner join Kelly's cheerleading squad when they learn the team is competing for a trip to Regionals in Hawaii. But when they accidentally get most of the squad sick with food poisoning, they must convince rival Aloe to fill-in and save the team. After losing her smart phone, Piper can't stay on top of her busy schedule, and soon embraces the life of a slacker. Note: This episode aired on Nickelodeon Latin America on 11 September 2012 and on Nickelodeon Greece on September 28, 2012.
24	"Epic Cupids"	Roger Christiansen	Ted Michaels & Tanya Scheer	April 24, 2013	116	N/A
After Bucket and Skinner's gym teacher breaks up with her boyfriend, she is mean to the kids, so Bucket and Skinner decide to fix her up with a fantastic boyfriend named Rodolfo. Note: This episode premiered on Nickelodeon Greece on 22 September 2012, on Nickelodeon Latin America on 24 September 2012 and on Nickelodeon Netherlands and Flanders on 6 November 2012.
25	"Epic Showdown"	Gil Junger	Boyce Bugliari & Jamie McLaughlin	May 1, 2013	119	N/A
Bucket and Skinner want to stop a big bully. Note: This episode premiered on Nickelodeon Greece on 25 September 2012 and on Nickelodeon Latin America on 27 September 2012.
26	"Epic Seal"	Roger Christiansen	Tommy Lynch	May 1, 2013	123	N/A
Bucket and Skinner must take care of a seal. Note: This episode premiered on Nickelodeon Greece on 29 September 2012, on Nickelodeon Germany on 29 October 2012 and on Nickelodeon Latin America on 14 December 2012.
