= Dash & Lily =

2020 American romantic comedy series

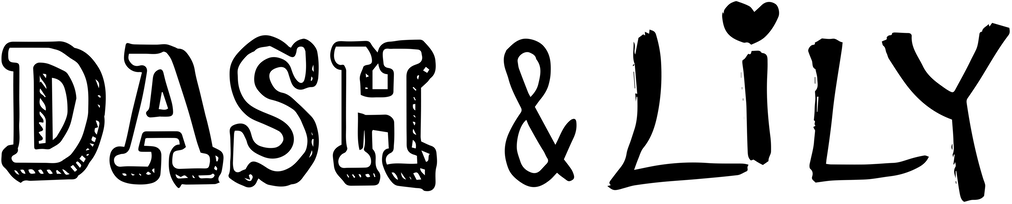
- Genre: Romantic comedy
- Created by: Joe Tracz
- Based on: Dash & Lily's Book of Dares by Rachel Cohn & David Levithan
- Starring: Austin Abrams; Midori Francis; Dante Brown; Troy Iwata
- Music by: Dan the Automator
- Country of origin: United States
- Original language: English
- No. of seasons: 1
- No. of episodes: 8

Production
- Executive producers: Brad Silberling; Nick Jonas; Phil McIntyre; Shawn Levy; Josh Barry; Joe Tracz
- Producer: Karl Frankenfield
- Cinematography: Eric Treml
- Editors: Robert Nassau; Jane Rizzo; Joe Giganti
- Running time: 23–27 minutes
- Production companies: 21 Laps Entertainment; Boy Detective Inc.; Image 32

Original release
- Network: Netflix
- Release: November 10, 2020

Dash & Lily is an American romantic comedy television series created by Joe Tracz and based on the young adult novel series Dash & Lily's Book of Dares by Rachel Cohn and David Levithan. The 8-episode series premiered on Netflix on November 10, 2020. In October 2021, the series was canceled after one season.

== Premise ==
During the Christmas holiday season, two teenagers living in New York City develop mutual romantic feelings as they open up to each other by trading messages as well as dares in a notebook around a multitude of locations. Along the way, they deal with how their blossoming romance affects and is impacted by friends, family members, and previous love interests.

== Cast ==
=== Main ===
- Austin Abrams as Dash, a teenager who hates Christmas
- Midori Francis as Lily, a 17-year-old girl who wants to find love
- Dante Brown as Boomer, Dash's best friend
- Troy Iwata as Langston, Lily's older brother

=== Recurring ===
- Keana Marie as Sofia, Dash's ex-girlfriend
- Michael Cyril Creighton as Jeff the Elf/Door Queen, a local actor
- Patrick Vaill as Mark, Lily and Langston's cousin who works as a Strand Bookstore clerk
- William Hill as Sal, Lily and Langston's paternal uncle, who portrays a Macy's Santa Claus
- Leah Kreitz as Aryn, a member of Lily's caroling group
- Ianne Fields Stewart as Roberta, a member of Lily's caroling group
- Agneeta Thacker as Priya, Sofia's best friend
- James Saito as Arthur Mori, Lily and Langston's Japanese American maternal grandfather
- Gideon Emery as Adam, Lily and Langston's father
- Jennifer Ikeda as Grace, Lily and Langston's mother
- Diego Guevara as Benny, Langston's boyfriend from Puerto Rico
- Glenn McCuen as Edgar Thibaud, Lily's bully from middle school
- Jodi Long as Lillian/"Mrs. Basil E.", Lily and Langston's maternal great-aunt, and Arthur's sister
- Michael Park as Gordon, Dash's father

=== Guests ===
- Nick Blaemire as Dov, a Jewish American teenager and one of the "Challah Back Boys"
- Trevor Braun as Yohnny, a Jewish American teenager and one of the "Challah Back Boys"
- Nick Jonas as Himself
- Jonas Brothers as Themselves (Performing "Like It's Christmas")

== Episodes ==
No.	Title	Directed by	Written by	Original release date
1	"Dash"	Brad Silberling	Teleplay by : Joe Tracz	November 10, 2020
Dash is a teenager living in New York City who despises Christmas. His father has gone out of town on Christmas vacation, along with many of his peers' parents. On the night of December 17 at the Strand Bookstore, he comes across a notebook with a message written on the front: "Do you dare?". He then follows a series of clues within the notebook to begin searching for the author's identity, leaving it for her to write a reply. The next day, he finds the notebook in a Two Boots where his best friend Boomer works. Boomer claims that he failed to catch the mystery girl on the restaurant's security footage. The two ultimately follow the book's instructions to try to take a hat from a Macy's Santa Claus actor. Although a security guard and an elf actor forcibly escort them out, Dash gets away with the hat and finds the author's name, Lily, sewed in front. A flashback reveals he bumped into Lily as she joined some friends for Christmas carols, but they did not introduce themselves to one another.
2	"Lily"	Brad Silberling	Joe Tracz	November 10, 2020
Lily is a shy, 17-year-old girl of mixed European and Japanese ancestry who loves Christmas but has never experienced romantic love, unlike the rest of her family. Her parents and grandfather have gone out of town to Fiji and Florida respectively, making her feel lonely. With encouragement and input from her older brother Langston, Lily plans to leave a notebook with cryptic clues for a potential romantic interest to read so that he might find her. After receiving Dash's answer to her initial clues, she visits Boomer at the Two Boots and leaves the notebook for another reply, warning Boomer not to tell "Notebook Boy" that he saw her. Dash follows Lily's instructions to steal a Macy's Santa Claus actor's hat while Boomer distracts Jeff, an elf actor. The Santa actor warns Dash not to mistreat their "mutual friend" before Dash takes his hat and flees, leading him and Boomer to be forcibly escorted from Macy's. Later that evening, Lily thanks her uncle Sal, who turns out to be the Santa actor, for his help in her plan, and he returns the notebook with a reply from Dash.
3	"Hanukkah"	Pamela Romanowsky	Carol Barbee	November 10, 2020
Lily writes to Dash about the worst Christmas she can remember. Dash then dares her to attend a wild, underground Hanukkah dance party hosted by two teens who call themselves the "Challah Back Boys", intending to push her outside her comfort zone. During the party, she hides in a bathroom, where she reads an encouraging message from Dash on a mirror. As she warms up to dancing with the other guests, she runs into Edgar: a former middle school bully who seems happy to see her again but insults her by calling her "weird". Lily flees the party and leaves behind one of her red boots in a patch of snow. Her grandfather Arthur, who has unexpectedly returned to town, finds out about her sneaking out late at night and grounds her.
4	"Cinderella"	Pamela Romanowsky	Carol Barbee	November 10, 2020
Dash finds Lily's boot but learns she forgot to leave the notebook at the party. After reading her unhappy response to his mirror message, he attempts to track down the boot's owner and learns it was purchased from Theater Development Fund by "Lillian St. Claire DuBois". He convinces a store clerk to give him the address of the purchaser, who turns out to be Lily's great aunt Lillian, a wealthy and eccentric performer nicknamed "Mrs. Basil E." by Lily and Langston. She takes a liking to Dash as he tells her that he wants to know if Lily is okay. Lillian confronts her brother Arthur about his grounding Lily and tells her great niece that Dash still cares about her. Subsequently, Arthur treats Lily to pizza at Two Boots. Lily gives the notebook to Boomer, who returns it to Dash. Dash reads Lily's message that, while the Hanukkah party was scary, it opened her to a new world, so she wants to do the same for him, sending him off to view the Christmas houses in Dyker Heights. Shortly after a sign reading "Believe" illuminates over Dash's head, he receives a text message from his ex-girlfriend Sofia.
5	"Sofia & Edgar"	Fred Savage	Lauren Moon	November 10, 2020
Dash and Lily hesitate to tell each other about the returns of Sofia and Edgar, respectively. For her next dare, Lily attends an "art break" class where participants must literally break their creations. She refuses to destroy her Dash-inspired puppet and finds solace in a dog park, where Edgar unexpectedly arrives wearing the friendship bracelet she gave him in middle school, then invites her to a slam poetry night. Lily is reluctant until Langston tells her that their family will be moving to Fiji soon. She finally takes out her frustration on several snowmen, then vents her anger towards Edgar at the slam poetry party. Edgar apologizes and invites Lily on a date, surprising her. Meanwhile, Dash learns to make mochi with a group of Japanese grandmothers. That evening, his father Gordon returns home with his new girlfriend Leeza and invites him and Sofia on a dinner double-date. At the dinner, Dash accepts Sofia's invitation to a Christmas Eve party hosted by fellow classmate Priya. Later, Edgar tells Dash and Sofia that he will bring his own date, but Dash is unaware he means Lily.
6	"Christmas Eve"	Fred Savage	Harry Tarre	November 10, 2020
Langston apologizes to Lily for arguing with her about their family's decision to move to Fiji and encourages her to ask Dash on a date via the notebook. Lily has an emergency meeting with Boomer at the Two Boots to discuss Dash spending time with Sofia, but Boomer does not know Sofia has returned. At Priya's Christmas Eve party, Boomer arrives with the notebook and finds Dash with Sofia. Angry that Dash did not tell him the truth, he urges his friend not to give up on Lily. After he leaves, Dash and Lily finally meet, but before Lily can introduce herself by name, she and Dash are interrupted respectively by Edgar and Sofia. In a game of Truth or Dare, Sofia dares Dash to "time travel" with her to the Morgan Library & Museum, where they had their first date; while Lily cannot answer several romance questions because she has never been on a date. She tries leaving the party, but Edgar intercepts and almost kisses her before his phone interrupts him. In the library, Sofia admits that she and Dash are incompatible because he has changed and was never completely honest with her, but she wants them to be more than friends and starts kissing him on a couch.
7	"Christmas"	Fred Savage	Rachel Cohn	November 10, 2020
Lily awakens on Christmas morning, hoping to find the notebook under her family tree, but it is nowhere to be found. She visits Lillian, who tells her she has not seen "Notebook Boy" since they first met but that, if she receives the notebook, she will "dash it right over". Lily makes the connection that the Dash from the previous night is "Notebook Boy". She calls Boomer to confirm and is heartbroken to learn Dash left the party with Sofia, so she goes to McSorley's Old Ale House and gets drunk. She texts Edgar to come to the pub and kiss her, which he does. A flashback reveals that Dash and Sofia mutually broke up but spent the night at the library, only to wake up in a panic because Dash forgot to deliver the notebook. Using a "Manhattan Mommy" app Boomer downloaded for his phone, Dash finds Lily through someone spotting her red boots but is devastated to find her kissing Edgar. On the cab ride to Lillian's, Dash and Lily are angry at each other for hiding the truth and start believing that neither is the person each had imagined. Dash declines to attend Boomer's family Christmas dinner and writes a breakup letter in the notebook to Lily, who receives it from Lillian.
8	"New Year's Eve"	Fred Savage	Joe Tracz	November 10, 2020
On New Year's Eve at the Strand, Lily's cousin and store clerk Mark gives Dash the notebook with a message from Lily, telling him she agrees their relationship would have never worked and that her family is soon leaving for Fiji. Dash tracks Boomer to a Jonas Brothers concert in Hudson Yards, where he finds him with Priya, Sofia, and the Challah Back Boys. In Nick Jonas's trailer, Sofia tells Dash that, to win Lily back, he should be emotionally honest, resulting in a plan to invite Lily back to the Strand. Meanwhile, during a family Oshogatsu ceremony at a Zen temple, Arthur tells Lily he will allow her to stay in New York with him if she admits Dash caused her recent behavior. Lily instead takes responsibility and calls out her family for their faults. On their way to the airport, Langston texts Lily a photo of a message from Dash stating that he knows he has been falling in love with her. Lily emerges from the cab and races to the Strand, where Jeff gives her the keys to enter. Following a truthful and heartfelt conversation, Dash and Lily share a kiss, beginning their romantic relationship. They spend the evening locked in the library while Lillian convinces Arthur to compromise so Lily can stay in New York, Boomer and Sofia become a couple, Langston reconnects with his boyfriend Benny, and Edgar spends the holiday alone. At midnight, Dash and Lily wish each other a happy new year and kiss once again.

== Production ==
=== Development ===
Netflix ordered an 8-episode adaptation of Levithan and Cohn's novel in October 2019. Joe Tracz served as series showrunner as well as writer and executive producer. Shawn Levy and Josh Barry from 21 Laps Entertainment, Nick Jonas from Image 32, and Brad Silberling also executive produced with Cohn and Levithan co-executive producing. Directors included Silberling, Fred Savage, and Pamela Romanowsky. On October 6, 2021, Netflix canceled the series after one season.

=== Casting ===
It was announced along with the series order that Austin Abrams and Midori Francis would star as the titular characters. Dante Brown and Troy Iwata would feature in the main cast and Keana Marie, James Saito, and Jodi Long in the recurring cast. The second round of casting was announced in November 2019 with Glenn McCuen, Michael Park, Gideon Emery, Jennifer Ikeda, and Diego Guevara also in the recurring cast. It was announced in March 2020 that Agneeta Thacker, Leah Kreitz, and Ianne Fields Stewart had joined the cast.

== Release ==
The series was released on November 10, 2020.

== Reception ==
=== Critical response ===
For the series, review aggregator Rotten Tomatoes reported an approval rating of 100% based on 34 reviews, with an average rating of 7.64/10. The website's critics consensus reads, "Anchored by the charming Midori Francis and Austin Abrams, Dash & Lily is a delightful rom-com adventure with plenty of holiday cheer." Metacritic gave the series a weighted average score of 80 out of 100 based on 4 reviews, indicating "generally favorable reviews".

=== Awards and nominations ===
Year	Award	Category	Nominee	Result	Ref.
2021	Daytime Emmy Awards	Outstanding Young Adult Series	Dash & Lily	Nominated	
2021	Daytime Emmy Awards	Outstanding Lead Actress in a Daytime Fiction Program	Midori Francis	Nominated	
2021	Daytime Emmy Awards	Outstanding Supporting Actress in a Daytime Fiction Program	Jodi Long	Won	
2021	Daytime Emmy Awards	Outstanding Directing Team for a Daytime Fiction Program	Dash & Lily	Nominated	
2021	Daytime Emmy Awards	Outstanding Writing Team for a Daytime Fiction Program	Joe Tracz, Carol Barbee, Lauren Moon, Harry Tarre and Rachel Cohn	Won	
2021	Daytime Emmy Awards	Outstanding Cinematography	Dash & Lily	Nominated	
2021	Daytime Emmy Awards	Outstanding Casting for a Drama or Daytime Fiction Program	Shayna Markowitz, Betsy Fippinger	Nominated	
2021	Daytime Emmy Awards	Outstanding Art Direction / Set Design for a Drama or Daytime Fiction Program	Jennifer Dehgan, Annie Simone, Amy Silver	Nominated	
2021	Daytime Emmy Awards	Outstanding Costume Design / Styling for a Drama or Daytime Fiction Program	Michelle Winters, Cristina Spiridakis, Courtney Wheeler	Nominated	
2021	Daytime Emmy Awards	Outstanding Hairstyling for a Drama or Daytime Fiction Program	Marcel Dagenais, Elvira Gonzalez	Nominated	
2021	Daytime Emmy Awards	Outstanding Makeup for a Drama or Daytime Fiction Program	Liz Coakley, Jacqueline Bensaid, Rebecca Levine	Won	
2021	Daytime Emmy Awards	Outstanding Music Direction and Composition for a Daytime Program	Dan the Automator	Nominated	

== See also ==
- List of Christmas films
