= Pan y Circo =

Mexican Spanish-language talk show

- Presented by: Diego Luna
- No. of seasons: 2
- No. of episodes: 10

Pan y Circo (Spanish for "Bread and Circus") is a Mexican Spanish-language talk show TV series that premiered on Amazon Video on August 7, 2020. The show is hosted by actor Diego Luna and was produced by La Corriente del Golfo, a production company run by Luna and fellow Mexican actor Gael García Bernal. In each episode, Luna and six guests sit for a meal prepared by a notable Mexican chef and discuss some sociopolitical issue. The guests include politicians, activists, academics, artists and celebrities. The show's first episode was filmed last, during the COVID-19 pandemic, and shows Luna and his guests all sitting at home, eating while videoconferencing together.

== Episodes ==
Season	Episodes	Originally released	
Season	Episodes	First released	Last released
1	7	August 7, 2020	August 14, 2020
2	3	October 8, 2021	January 24, 2022

=== Season 1 (2020) ===
No. overall	No. in season	Title	Directed by	Original release date
1	1	"Chronicles of the Pandemic: Covid-19 and its Consequences"	Gregory Allen	August 7, 2020
Guests: Julia Carabias, Daptnhe Cuevas, Emiliano Monge, Samuel Ponce de León. Chef: Jair Téllez. Additional interviews with: Elena Reygadas, Carlos Martínez, Yásnaya E. Aguilar Gil, Dayra Fyah, Hugo López-Gatell.
2	2	"#NotOneMore: Gender Violence"	Gregory Allen	August 7, 2020
Guests: Andrea Medina Rosas, Dayra Fyah, Dilcya Samantha García, Araceli Osorio Martínez, María Candelaria Ochoa, Marion Reimers. Chef: Alexander Suástegui.
3	3	"Failures of Prohibition: Drug Legalization"	Gregory Allen	August 7, 2020
Guests: Miguel Ángel Osorio Chong, Dení Álvarez Icaza, Gael García Bernal, Juan Manuel Santos, Zara Snapp. Chef: Enrique Olvera.
4	4	"The Future is Here: Climate Change"	Gregory Allen	August 14, 2020
Guests: Rubén Albarrán, Ruth Buendía, Julia Carabias, José M. Hernández, Ninfa Salinas Sada, Liliana Saumet. Chef: Elena Reygadas.
5	5	"My Body is Mine: Abortion"	Gregory Allen	August 14, 2020
Guests: Daptnhe Cuevas, Ana de la Reguera, Fr. Julián Cruzalta, Martha Lucía Mícher, Nadine Flora Gasman, Olga Sánchez Cordero. Chef: Alejandra Barbabosa.
6	6	"No One is Illegal: Immigrants and Emigrants"	Gregory Allen	August 14, 2020
Guests: Alberto Capella, Arturo Sarukhán, Carlos Martínez, Marisoul Hernández, Irma Mendoza, Odilia Romero. Chef: Javier Plascencia.
7	7	"Looking Ourselves in the Mirror: Identity and Racism"	Gregory Allen	August 14, 2020
Guests: Yásnaya Aguilar, Pedro Cayuqueo, Eugenia Iturriaga, Rogelio Jiménez Pons, Eduardo López. Chef: Jair Téllez.

=== Season 2 (2021–22) ===
No. overall	No. in season	Title	Directed by	Original release date
8	1	"Acceso a la salud"	Diego Luna	October 8, 2021
The first special, Access to health, questions how the pandemic is just one more problem that came to overload a deficient health system, highlighting its shortcomings. It is put on the table what has been done in Mexico to save lives, vaccination policies, the participation of civil society; what are the actions that the government would need to take to adapt to the cultural, social and genetic needs of the population and where is the limit of what is public and what is private.
9	2	"Crisis de la democracia"	Diego Luna	November 25, 2021
Democracy is questioned through the relationship between the state and the citizens: why does democracy constantly lead to the triumph of leaders who do not fulfill their campaign promises? How to live in a democracy when violence is a constant? What alternatives can citizens build? The autocracy lurks behind this worldwide crisis.
10	3	"Discriminar en español"	Diego Luna & Santiago Maza	January 24, 2022
Bread and Circus travels to Madrid to try to find an answer to a question equally uncomfortable for Latin America and Spain: why is the Conquest hailed as a symbol of glory for some, and as an unanswered grievance for others? The third special of the second season turns to and gathers a plurality of Spanish-American voices to talk about Discrimination in Spanish.

== Reception ==
Inkoo Kang of The Hollywood Reporter criticized the choice of guests as leading to tepid conversations, giving as an example the episode on abortion, which did not include anyone opposed to abortion. She did single out two episodes for praise: the episode on the drug war, and especially the episode on immigration, in which she wrote it was "truly fascinating" to hear Mexicans wrestle with their own country's anti-immigrant attitudes.

== See also ==
- Dinner for Five
- Red Table Talk
