= Diego Luna =

Mexican actor (born 1979)

- Luna in 2026
- Born: Diego Dionisio Luna Alexander; 29 December 1979 (age 46); Toluca, Mexico
- Other name: Alexander García
- Occupations: Actor; producer; director
- Years active: 1987–present
- Spouse: Camila Sodi (m. 2008; div. 2013)
- Children: 2
- Parents: Alejandro Luna † (father); Fiona Alexander † (mother)

Diego Dionisio Luna Alexander (Spanish: [ˈdjeɣo ˈluna aleɣˈsandeɾ]; born 29 December 1979) is a Mexican actor, producer, and director. He is best known for his portrayal of Cassian Andor in Rogue One (2016) and its prequel series Andor (2022–2025), for which he was nominated twice for a Golden Globe Award for Best Actor – Television Series Drama.

Following an early career in Mexican telenovelas, Luna had his breakthrough in the critically acclaimed 2001 film Y tu mamá también. During the 2000s, he appeared in both Mexican and American films including Frida, Open Range, Dirty Dancing: Havana Nights, The Terminal, Criminal, Milk, Sólo quiero caminar, and Rudo y Cursi. In the 2010s, his films included the science fiction Elysium, comedy Casa de mi Padre, and the animated musical The Book of Life. From 2018 to 2020, he starred as the drug trafficker Miguel Ángel Félix Gallardo in Narcos: Mexico.

Luna has appeared in numerous Mexican theater productions and produced both film and television projects, many with Gael García Bernal. Since 2010, he has directed three feature films: Abel, Cesar Chavez, and Mr. Pig. He is the creator and director of the 2013 Fusion TV docu-series Back Home, the Amazon Studios talk show Pan y Circo, which premiered in 2020, and the 2021 Netflix scripted series Everything Will Be Fine. In 2025, Time magazine listed Luna as one of the world's 100 most influential people.

== Early life ==
Luna was born in Toluca and raised in Mexico City. His mother, Fiona Alexander, was a British costume designer of Scottish and English descent. She died in a car accident when Luna was two years old. His father, Alejandro Luna, was a theater, film, and opera set designer. He has an older sister. Luna and his frequent co-star Gael García Bernal have known each other since infancy, as their mothers were friends. They spent time together as young children and developed a close friendship growing up. In 1994, Luna participated in youth-led activism in support of Indigenous rights during the Zapatista uprising in Chiapas. Alongside classmates, he helped organize protests, fundraisers, and food drives in response to the movement.

== Career ==
=== Acting ===
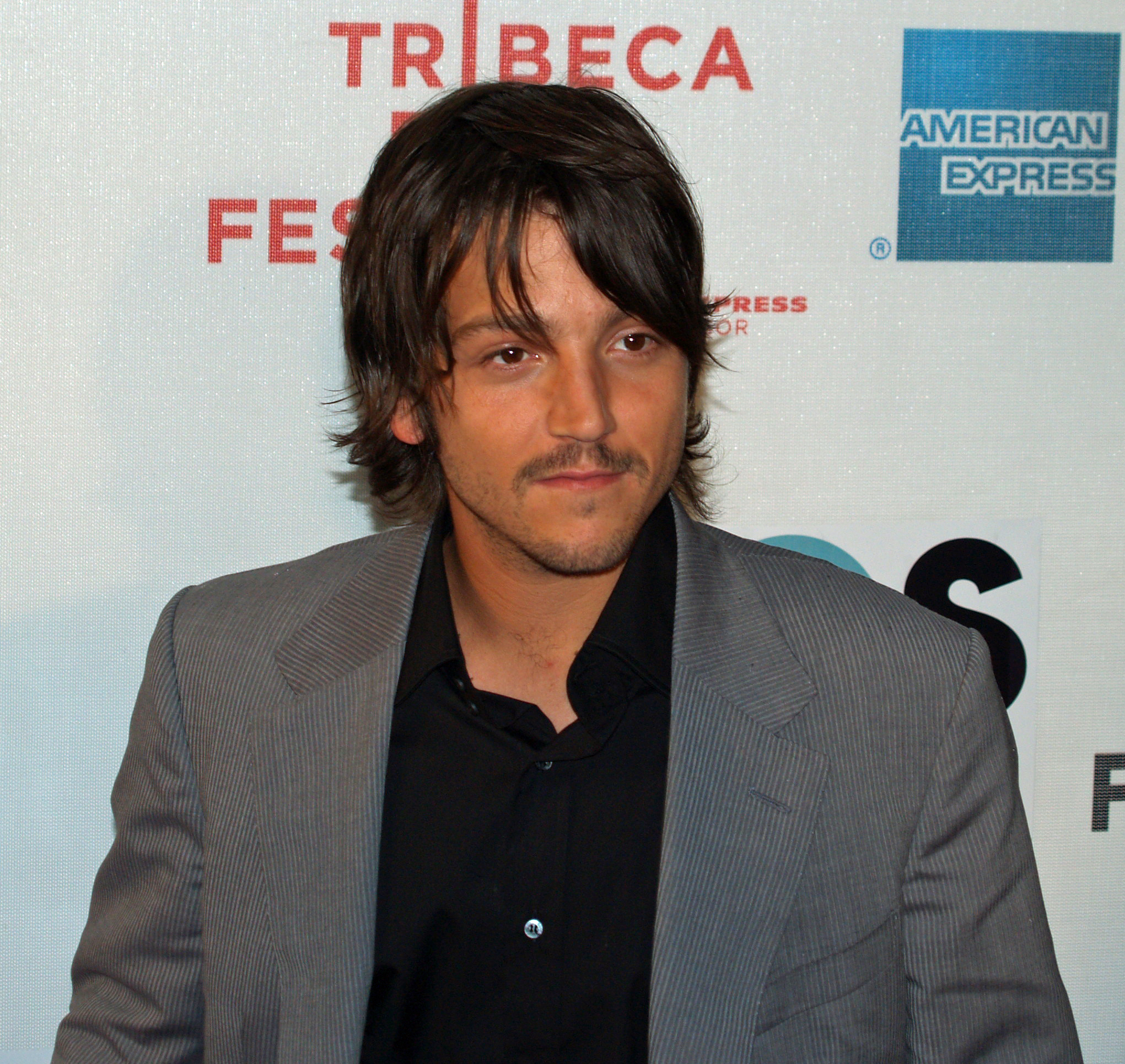
Luna at the 2007 Tribeca Film Festival

Luna acted in his first play at age seven. As a child actor, he appeared in several telenovelas and films. In 1992, he had story arcs on Televisa's El abuelo y yo and Ángeles sin paraíso. As a teenager, Luna was part of the main casts of El premio mayor (1995–1996) and La vida en el espejo (1999–2000), playing the main characters' son; he also starred in the films Un hilito de sangre (A Trickle of Blood; 1995), El cometa (The Comet; 1999), and Un dulce olor a muerte (A Sweet Scent of Death; 1995), all which made him a teen star. He had small roles in the films Todo el poder (Gimme the Power; 2000) and Before Night Falls (2000).

Luna starred as Tenoch Iturbide alongside Gael García Bernal in Y tu mamá también (2001), a Mexican road trip film directed by Alfonso Cuarón. A critical and box office success, the role brought him international stardom. The film was the beginning of a series of high-profile collaborations with childhood friend García Bernal, with whom he would costar in several films and go on to establish Canana Films. For these roles and others, the two are considered to be faces of the Nuevo Cine Mexicano film movement.

In the following two years, Luna acted in Mexican films along with English-language productions like the miniseries Fidel, Vampires: Los Muertos, the Kevin Costner western Open Range, and the Academy Award-winning Frida. He starred in the 2003 film Nicotina, which was critically and commercially successful in Mexico. 2004 was a significant year for Luna as he starred in Steven Spielberg's The Terminal alongside Tom Hanks, the film Dirty Dancing: Havana Nights (a Cuban-based reimagining of Dirty Dancing), and the indie crime film Criminal alongside John C. Reilly. He subsequently had starring roles in the films Fade to Black (2006) and Harmony Korine's Mister Lonely (2007), and also appeared in the critically acclaimed biopic Milk (2008). In Spanish-language film, he starred in Sólo Dios sabe opposite Alice Braga (Only God Knows; 2006), crime thriller Solo quiero caminar (Walking Vengeance; 2008)—for which he was nominated for a Goya Award—and the soccer comedy Rudo y Cursi (2008), one of the highest grossing Mexican films of all time.

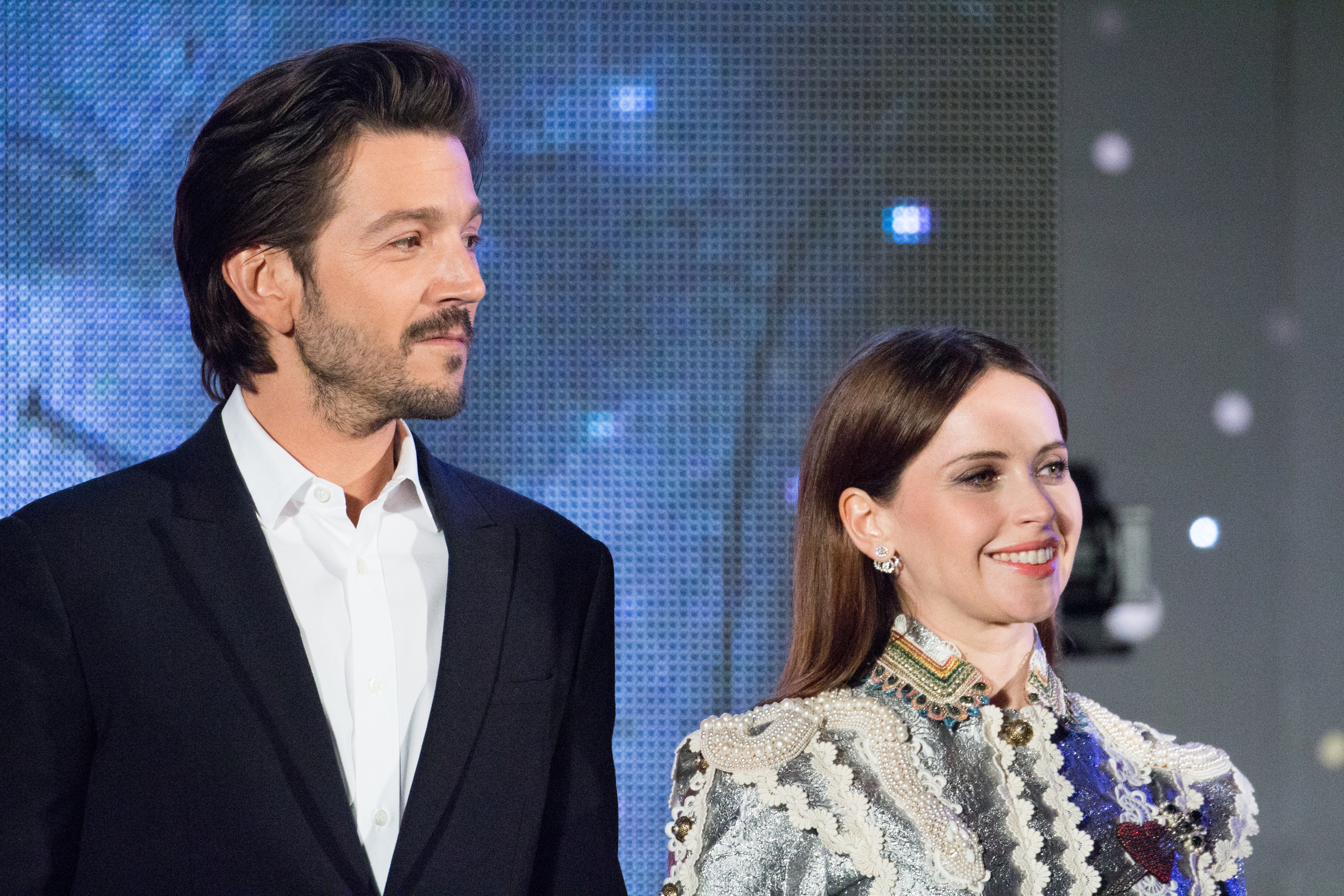
Luna and Felicity Jones at the premiere of Rogue One: A Star Wars Story in Japan

In the early 2010s, Luna co-starred in the Will Ferrell Spanish-language comedy Casa de mi Padre (2012) and appeared in the action films Contraband and Elysium. He appeared opposite Katy Perry in her music video for "The One That Got Away;" as of 2024, the music video has over 1 billion views on YouTube. He starred in the animated musical comedy The Book of Life (2014) whose soundtrack charted in numerous countries. In 2015, the pilot episode of the Amazon Studios series Casanova, in which Luna stars as Giacomo Casanova. The show was not picked up to series.

In August 2015, it was announced that Luna was part of the cast of what was then known as Star Wars: Rogue One. Rogue One: A Star Wars Story premiered in 2016, and his portrayal of Cassian Andor, a captain and intelligence officer of the Rebel Alliance, brought him international attention. He reprised the role in Andor (2022–2025), the Disney+ series centered around the character. The show was originally announced in 2018 but production was delayed until November 2020 by the development process and the COVID-19 pandemic. A second and final season began production in the fall 2022 and was expected to wrap up filming in August 2023. However, it was delayed because of the 2023 SAG-AFTRA strike. The second season competed filming in February 2024 and began airing in April, 2025. Luna is an executive producer of the series.

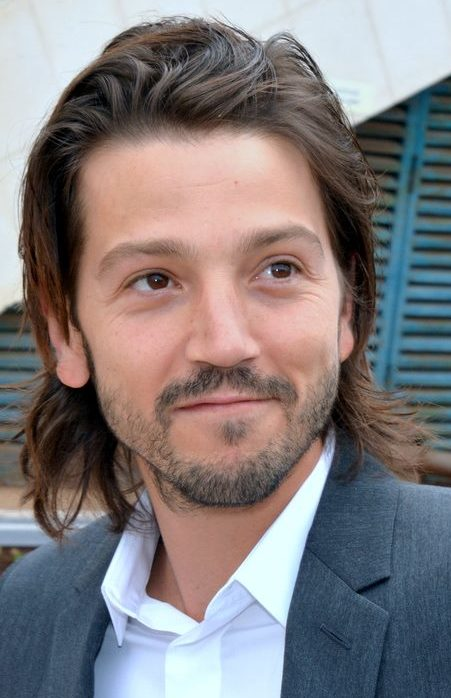
Luna in 2016

In 2017, it was announced that he would star in a Scarface remake; however, the film went through multiple rewrites and directorial changes in the following years, losing Luna as the lead in the process.

Luna starred as Mexican drug cartel leader Miguel Ángel Félix Gallardo in the Netflix series Narcos: Mexico, which premiered in November 2018. He appeared in the first two seasons of the show. Film roles around this time included ensemble roles in the auteur films If Beale Street Could Talk (2018) and A Rainy Day in New York (2019), and a starring role in the 2020 indie drama Wander Darkly. Luna had a number of voice acting roles in children's animation, including the 2022 box office hit DC League of Super-Pets; notably, he is part of every installment of Guillermo del Toro's Tales of Arcadia television franchise: Trollhunters (2016), 3Below (2018), Wizards (2020) and the film Trollhunters: Rise of the Titans (2021). In 2024, he again, starred alongside close friend and frequent collaborator Gael Garcia Bernal, in the Hulu Original miniseries, La Máquina, as the eponymous character's long time friend and manager, Andronico "Andy" Lujan. He received a Golden Globe nomination for Best Performance by a Male Actor in a Supporting Role on Television in 2025 for his performance in the series. The same year, he starred as Valentín in the film adaptation of the musical version of Kiss of the Spider Woman, alongside Tonatiuh as Molina and Jennifer Lopez as the title character, which premiered at the 2025 Sundance Film Festival.

=== Producing and directing ===
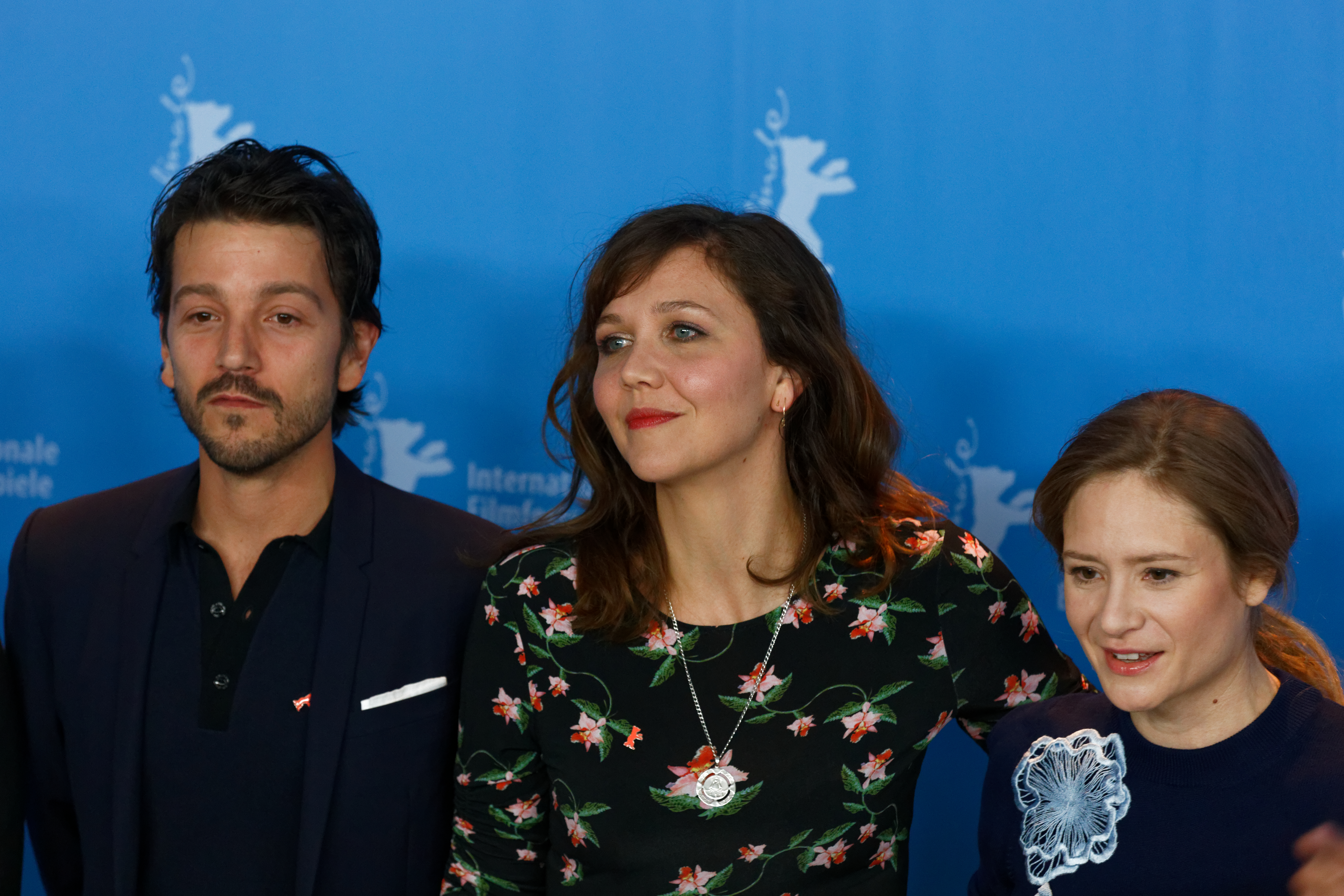
Luna, Maggie Gyllenhaal, and Julia Jentsch at the 2017 Berlinale

With frequent collaborator Gael García Bernal and producer Pablo Cruz, Luna created the production company Canana Films in 2005. Together, they have produced dozens of Mexican film and television productions. Notably, they executive produced the 2009 Cary Fukunaga film Sin nombre, which was honored by the Sundance Film Festival and Independent Spirit Awards, the 2011 thriller Miss Bala which was submitted as Mexico's foreign-language Oscar submission, and the 2015 drama The Chosen Ones. In 2015, Luna and Cruz launched the branded entertainment studio Gloria for Latin American talent.

Luna and García Bernal departed Canana in 2018, subsequently founding a new production company, La Corriente del Golfo. In October 2019, it was announced that Luna and García Bernal were joining the Creative Advisory Board for the TV and film development company EXILE Content. In 2020, they signed a first-look deal with Amazon Studios.

In 2007, Luna directed his first film, a documentary about Mexican boxer Julio César Chávez. His first feature film, a dramedy titled Abel, premiered at the 2010 Sundance Film Festival and received positive reviews.

In 2012, Luna directed the biopic Cesar Chávez; the film starred Michael Peña as Cesar Chávez, the founder of the United Farm Workers, America Ferrera, and Rosario Dawson. The film premiered at the 64th Berlin International Film Festival and was awarded an Audience Award for Narrative Feature at the 2014 SXSW Film Festival. The film received mixed reviews. The following year, he created and directed the docu-series Back Home, which follows celebrity guests on a journey to their family homelands. The show was broadcast on Fusion TV.

His next feature film was Mr. Pig, also known as Sr. Pig, which premiered at the 2016 Sundance Film Festival. The film stars Danny Glover and Maya Rudolph whose characters travel on a road trip through Mexico.

It was announced in 2019 that Luna and García Bernal would executive produce an epic miniseries Cortes for Amazon starring Javier Bardem as conquistador Hernán Cortés, then described as "the largest Spanish-language production of all time." Two weeks into production in 2020, the production was canceled due to the COVID-19 pandemic.

In 2020, Luna created the Amazon Prime Video talk show Pan y Circo, which he produced, directed, and hosts; the following year, he received a Daytime Emmy Award for Outstanding Daytime Talent in a Spanish Language Program. He created his first scripted television series, the satirical drama Everything Will Be Fine, which was released on Netflix in 2021. Luna is also an executive producer of his series Andor which premiered in 2022. In 2023, it was announced that Luna is set to executive produce and star in a 'The Boys: Mexico' spinoff alongside his frequent collaborator and friend, Gael García Bernal.

In February 2025, he began shooting A Mouthful of Ash, which he produced, directed and co-wrote based on the novel by Brenda Navarro.

=== Other work ===
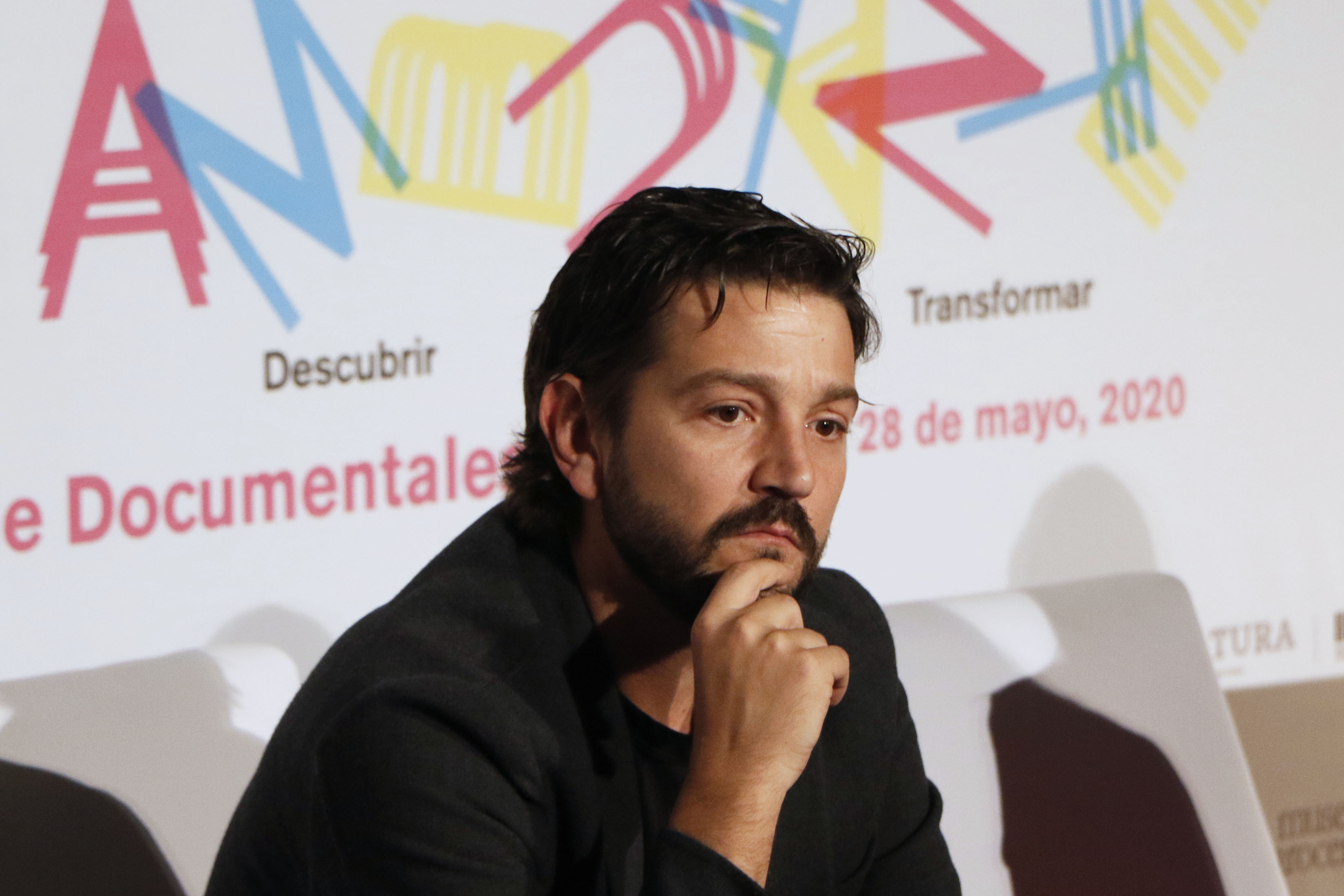
Luna in 2020

Luna, García Bernal, and Elena Fortes co-founded Ambulante, also known as the Ambulante Documentary Film Festival, an organization and film festival whose mission is for documentary films to be used as tools for transformation. The organization received the prestigious Washington Office on Latin America's Human Rights Award in 2011. In January 2015, Luna narrated a video of theirs about the obstacles faced by children migrating from their home countries and seeking refuge in the U.S.

Luna was a repeat host of the 2000s-era MTV Video Music Awards Latinoamérica, hosting in 2002, 2003, and 2007; he presented an award at the 2006 ceremony. In 2004, he co-hosted the 18th Goya Awards with Cayetana Guillén Cuervo. He has also presented at the 2005 MTV Europe Music Awards, Premio Lo Nuestro 2014, 2014 MTV Fandom Awards, 74th Golden Globe Awards, 2018 MTV Europe Music Awards, 91st Academy Awards, and 74th Primetime Emmy Awards.

Luna was a jury member at the 2008 Sundance Film Festival. He was a member of the 2016 jury for the Un Certain Regard section of the Cannes Film Festival. In 2017, he was part of the International Jury at the 67th Berlin International Film Festival.

== Personal life ==
Luna married Camila Sodi in February 2008; they divorced in March 2013. They have two children: Jerónimo (b. 12 August 2008), and Fiona (b. 1 July 2010), named after Luna's mother. Since 2019, he has been in a relationship with Marina de Tavira; they made their first public appearance together in 2021.

Luna previously resided in Los Angeles; since 2017, he and his family have lived in Mexico City.

== Filmography ==
=== Film ===
Key
†	Denotes films that have not yet been released

Year	Title	Role	Notes	Ref.
1994	Ámbar	Muni Frahabarana		
1995	Morena	Dos		
1995	A Trickle of Blood	León		
1997	The Comet	Victor		
1999	A Sweet Scent of Death	Ramón		
2000	Before Night Falls	Carlos		
2000	Todo el Poder	Esteban		
2001	Y tu mamá también	Tenoch Iturbide		
2002	Frida	Alejandro Gonzalez Arias		
2002	Vampires: Los Muertos	Sancho		
2002	The Bronze Screen: 100 Years of the Latino Image in Hollywood	Himself		
2003	Nicotina	Lolo		
2003	Carambola	El Perro		
2003	Soldados de Salamina	Gastón		
2003	Open Range	Button		
2004	Dirty Dancing: Havana Nights	Javier Suarez		
2004	The Terminal	Enrique Cruz		
2004	Criminal	Rodrigo		
2006	Only God Knows	Damián	Executive producer	
2006	Drama/Mex	—N/a	Executive producer	
2006	Un mundo maravilloso	Reportero en Estocolmo		
2006	Fade to Black	Tommaso Moreno		
2007	Mister Lonely	Michael Jackson		
2007	Déficit	—N/a	Producer	
2007	Cochochi	—N/a	Executive producer	
2007	El búfalo de la noche	Manuel	Co-producer	
2007	J.C. Chávez	Himself	Documentary; director and producer	
2008	Just Walking	Gabriel	Executive producer	
2008	Voy a explotar	—N/a	Executive producer	
2008	Milk	Jack Lira		
2008	Rudo y Cursi	Beto		
2009	Sin nombre	—N/a	Executive producer	
2010	Abel	—N/a	Director and producer	
2011	Na Nai'a: Legend of the Dolphins	Himself (narrator)	Documentary	
2011	Miss Bala	—N/a	Executive producer	
2012	Contraband	Gonzalo		
2012	Casa de Mi Padre	Raul		
2012	Made in Mexico	Himself	Documentary	
2013	Paraíso	—N/a	Executive producer	
2013	Elysium	Julio		
2014	César Chávez	—N/a	Director and producer	
2014	The Book of Life	Manolo Sanchez (voice)		
2015	The Chosen Ones	—N/a	Executive producer	
2016	Mr. Pig	—N/a	Director, writer and producer	
2016	Salt and Fire	—N/a	Executive producer	
2016	Blood Father	Jonah		
2016	The Bad Batch	Jimmy		
2016	Rogue One: A Star Wars Story	Cassian Andor		
2017	Flatliners	Ray		
2017	Crow: The Legend	Moth (voice)	Short film	
2018	If Beale Street Could Talk	Pedrocito		
2019	Chicuarotes	—N/a	Associate producer	
2019	Berlin, I Love You	Drag Queen		
2019	A Rainy Day in New York	Francisco Vega		
2020	Wander Darkly	Matteo		
2021	Trollhunters: Rise of the Titans	Krel Tarron (voice)		
2022	DC League of Super-Pets	Chip (voice)		
2025	Kiss of the Spider Woman	Valentin Arregui	Executive producer	
2025	On the Road (En el camino)	—N/a	Producer	
2026	Ashes	—N/a	Director, writer, and producer	
2026	México 86	Martín de la Torre	Also executive producer	
2028	Tangled †	Hawthorne	Filming	
TBA	Eleven Days †	Federico Carrasco	Post-production	

=== Television ===
Year	Title	Role	Notes	Ref.
1992	El abuelo y yo	Luis		
1992–1993	Ángeles sin paraíso	Móises		
1995	El premio mayor	Quique Domínguez	Recurring	
1999	La vida en el espejo	Eugenio Román Franco		
2002	Fidel	Renato Guitart	Television film	
2010	Great Migrations	Narrator	Miniseries	
2010	Gritos de muerte y libertad	Guadalupe Victoria	Miniseries	
2010–2012	Soy tu fan	—N/a	Co-producer	
2011	Niño Santo	—N/a	Associate producer	
2013	Alguien Más	—N/a	Co-producer	
2013	American Dad!	Mauricio (voice)	Episode: "Poltergasm"	
2013	Back Home	—N/a	Creator, director, executive producer	
2015	Casanova	Giacomo Casanova	Amazon Studios pilot	
2018–2020	Narcos: Mexico	Miguel Ángel Félix Gallardo	Lead role; 20 episodes	
2018	Trollhunters: Tales of Arcadia	Krel Tarron (voice)	Episode: "In Good Hands"	
2018–2019	3Below: Tales of Arcadia	Krel Tarron (voice)	Lead role	
2020	Wizards: Tales of Arcadia	Krel Tarron (voice)	3 episodes	
2020	Home Movie: The Princess Bride	Inigo Montoya	Miniseries	
2020	Pan y Circo	Himself (host)	Talk show; creator and executive producer	
2021	Everything Will Be Fine	—N/a	Creator, director, and executive producer	
2021	Maya and the Three	Zatz (voice)	Miniseries	
2022–2025	Andor	Cassian Andor	Lead role and executive producer; 23 episodes	
2024	La Máquina	Andronico "Andy" Lujan	Lead role, executive producer; Hulu original miniseries	

=== Theater ===
Selected credits

- El Cantaro Roto (1996)
- Festen (2006–2007) – Teatro Helénico
- The Good Canary / El buen canario (2008–2009) – Teatro de los Insurgentes
- Howl (2012) – Teatro Helénico
- Cada vez nos despedimos mejor (2013, 2014) – Teatro de la Sala Chopin
- Privacy (2017–2018) – Teatro de los Insurgentes
- Cada vez nos despedimos mejor (2022) – Las Naves del Español, Madrid

=== Music videos ===
Year	Title	Artist	Role	Ref.
2011	"The One That Got Away"	Katy Perry	Artist Boyfriend	
2018	"El beso"	Mon Laferte	Man	

== Awards and nominations ==
Year	Association	Category	Work	Result	Ref.
1997	Asociacion Mexicana de Criticos de Teatro	Best Debutant Actor in a Play	El Cantaro Roto	Won	
2002	Venice Film Festival	Marcello Mastroianni Award (shared with Gael García Bernal)	Y tu mamá también	Won	
2002	MTV Movie Awards Mexico	Best Insult (shared with Gael García Bernal)	Y tu mamá también	Won	
2002	MTV Movie Awards Mexico	Best Kiss (shared with Maribel Verdú and Gael García Bernal)	Y tu mamá también	Nominated	
2004	MTV Movie Awards Mexico	Favorite Actor	Nicotina	Won	
2004	MTV Movie Awards Mexico	Worst Smoker	Nicotina	Won	
2004	MTV Movie Awards Mexico	Best Diego Luna in a Movie	Nicotina	Won	
2004	MTV Movie Awards Mexico	Hottest Scene	Nicotina	Nominated	
2004	Premios Juventud	¡Qué Actorazo!	Nicotina	Nominated	
2005	Premios Juventud	¡Qué Actorazo!		Nominated	
2007	Premios Juventud	¡Qué Actorazo!	Sólo Dios Sabe	Nominated	
2009	Cinema Writers Circle Awards	Best Actor	Just Walking	Nominated	
2009	Goya Awards	Best Actor	Just Walking	Nominated	
2009	Ariel Award	Best Actor	Rudo y Cursi	Nominated	
2009	Screen Actors Guild Awards	Best Ensemble	Milk	Nominated	
2009	Critics Choice Award	Best Ensemble	Milk	Won	
2010	Morelia International Film Festival	Premio Cuervo Tradicional		Won	
2011	Ariel Awards	Best Picture (as director)	Abel	Nominated	
2011	Ariel Awards	Best Director	Abel	Nominated	
2011	Ariel Awards	Best Screenplay (with Augusto Mendoza)	Abel	Won	
2012	Imagen Award	Best Supporting Actor/Feature Film	Casa de mi padre	Won	
2012	MTV Movie Awards	Best Latino Actor	Casa de mi padre	Nominated	
2012	Premios Juventud	¡Qué Actorazo!		Nominated	
2014	Premios Juventud	¡Qué Actorazo!		Nominated	
2014	Audience Awards	Narrative Spotlight	Cesar Chavez	Won	
2017	Imagen Award	Best Actor – Feature Film	Rogue One	Won	
2017	Saturn Awards	Best Supporting Actor in a Film	Rogue One	Nominated	
2017	Teen Choice Awards	Choice Sci-Fi Movie Actor	Rogue One	Nominated	
2018	Washington D.C. Area Film Critics Association	Best Ensemble	If Beale Street Could Talk	Nominated	
2018	Seattle Film Critics Society	Best Ensemble Cast	If Beale Street Could Talk	Nominated	
2019	Critics' Choice Television Awards	Best Actor in a Drama Series	Narcos: Mexico	Nominated	
2019	Platino Awards	Best Actor in a Miniseries or TV series	Narcos: Mexico	Won	
2020	Imagen Award	Best Actor – Television	Narcos: Mexico	Won	
2021	Daytime Emmy Awards	Outstanding Daytime Talent in a Spanish Language Program	Pan y Circo	Won	
2021	Platino Awards	Platino Honorary Award		Won	
2022	Peabody Awards	Entertainment	Andor	Won	
2024	Critics' Choice Awards	Best Actor in a Drama Series	Andor	Nominated	
2024	Golden Globe Awards	Best Actor – Television Series Drama	Andor	Nominated	
2024	Critics' Choice Super Awards	Best Science Fiction/Fantasy Series	Andor	Nominated	
2024	Primetime Emmy Awards	Outstanding Drama Series	Andor	Nominated	
2025	Golden Globe Awards	Best Performance by a Male Actor in a Supporting Role on Television	La Máquina	Nominated	
2026	Sarajevo Film Festival	Honorary Heart of Sarajevo Award	Lifetime Achievement	Honored	
