= Tiny Creatures =

2020 pseudo-documentary series

- Arizona title card
- Genre: Fiction, pseudo-documentary
- Created by: Jonathan Jones
- Directed by: Jonathan Jones
- Starring: Various small animals and predators
- Voices of: Mike Colter
- Narrated by: Mike Colter
- Country of origin: United States
- Original language: English
- No. of seasons: 1
- No. of episodes: 8

Production
- Production locations: Sonoran Desert, Manhattan, New York City, New York, Minnesota, Texas, New Orleans, Louisiana, England
- Cinematography: Jonathan Jones
- Editors: Donovan Jones; Joe Carnaby
- Camera setup: Multi-camera
- Running time: 24-25 minutes
- Production companies: Momentum; Blackfin; Ember

Original release
- Network: Netflix
- Release: August 7, 2020

Tiny Creatures is a 2020 pseudo-documentary that depicts fictional stories starring nature's tiny creatures. Despite the fact that the series' events and sets are largely staged and scripted, it is advertised as a documentary by Netflix.

== Episodes ==
No.	Title	Original release date
1	"Arizona"	August 7, 2020
2	"New York"	August 7, 2020
3	"Minnesota"	August 7, 2020
4	"Texas"	August 7, 2020
5	"Louisiana"	August 7, 2020
6	"Florida"	August 7, 2020
7	"Washington"	August 7, 2020
8	"New Hampshire"	August 7, 2020

== Release ==
Tiny Creatures was released on August 7, 2020 on Netflix.
