= Alejandro Luna =

Mexican scenic designer (1939–2022)

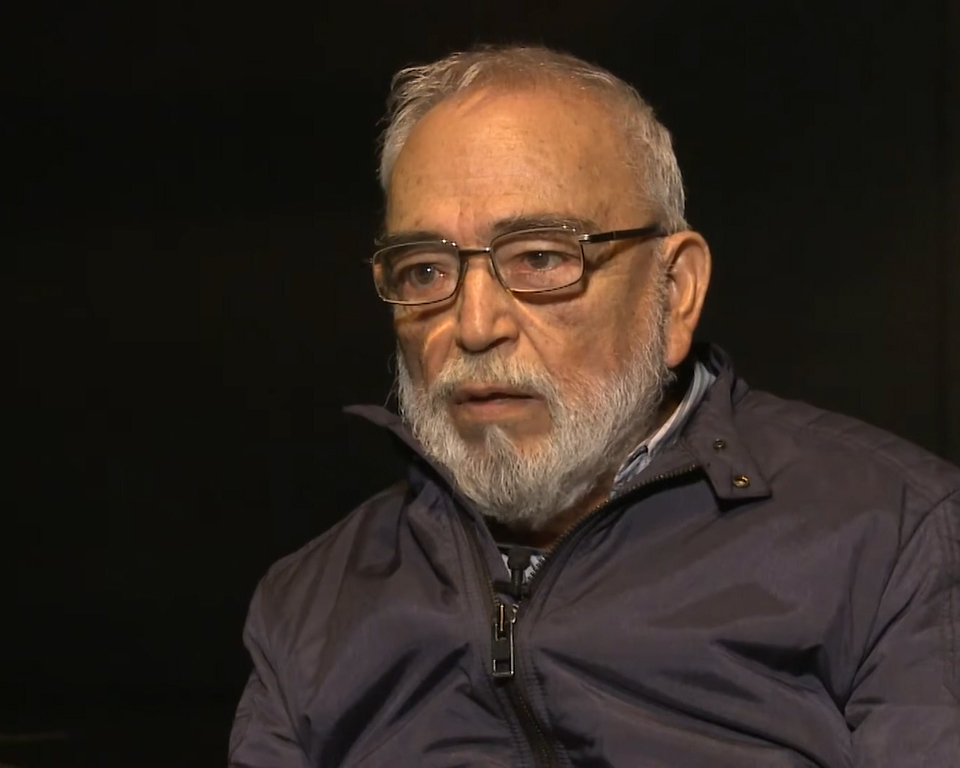
Luna in 2017

José Alejandro Dionisio Luna Ledesma (1 December 1939 – 13 December 2022) was a Mexican scenic designer and lighting technician.

== Life and career ==
Luna was born in Mexico City, where he passed his studies of architecture. He has worked in theater, opera and for television and cinema productions. He also was director of the Centro Universitario de Teatro of the Universidad Nacional Autónoma de México (UNAM) and taught at several Mexican universities from 1968 to 2007. He participated at the Prague Quadriennale from 1967 to 1975 three times in a row, as well as in 2003 and 2007. In 2003 he was a member of the Prague Quadriennale. He was the father of actor Diego Luna.

Luna died on 13 December 2022, aged 83.

== Awards ==
- Premio Nacional de las Artes, 2001
- Distinguished Artist Award of the International Society of Performing Arts, 2004
- Doctor Honoris Causa of the Universidad Autónoma de Baja California (UABC)
