= Trollhunters: Tales of Arcadia =

2016 animated television series created by Guillermo del Toro

- Season 1 promotional poster
- Genre: Action; Adventure; Comedy drama; Science fantasy; Urban fantasy
- Created by: Guillermo del Toro
- Based on: Trollhunters by: Guillermo del Toro; Daniel Kraus
- Showrunners: Guillermo del Toro; Marc Guggenheim; Kevin Hageman Dan Hageman
- Written by: Marc Guggenheim; Kevin Hageman; Dan Hageman; Aaron Waltke; AC Bradley; Chad Quandt
- Directed by: Rodrigo Blaas
- Voices of: Kelsey Grammer; Anton Yelchin; Charlie Saxton; Lexi Medrano; Jonathan Hyde; Fred Tatasciore; Victor Raider-Wexler; Ron Perlman; Clancy Brown; Amy Landecker; Steven Yeun; Cole Sand; Emile Hirsch
- Theme music composer: Alexandre Desplat
- Composer: Tim Davies
- Country of origin: United States
- Original language: English
- No. of seasons: 3
- No. of episodes: 52

Production
- Executive producers: Guillermo del Toro; Marc Guggenheim; Christina Steinberg; Chad Hammes (seasons 2–3); Rodrigo Blaas (seasons 2–3)
- Running time: 21–22 minutes
- Production companies: Double Dare You Productions; DreamWorks Animation Television

Original release
- Network: Netflix
- Release: December 23, 2016 – May 25, 2018

Related
- 3Below: Tales of Arcadia; Wizards: Tales of Arcadia; Trollhunters: Rise of the Titans

Trollhunters: Tales of Arcadia is an American animated fantasy television series created by Guillermo del Toro, produced by DreamWorks Animation Television and Double Dare You Productions, and distributed by Netflix. It was based on the 2015 novel Trollhunters by del Toro and Daniel Kraus. It follows the story of James "Jim" Lake Jr., a teenage boy who finds a mysterious amulet and stumbles across a secret realm inhabited by trolls and other magical creatures. Soon afterward, he and his friends are charged with protecting the world from the dangerous monsters that lurk in the shadows of their small suburban town.

The first two episodes of the series premiered on October 8, 2016, at the New York Comic Con. The first season was released on Netflix worldwide on December 23, 2016. The second season premiered on December 15, 2017. The third and final season premiered on May 25, 2018.

Since its release, Trollhunters has been widely praised as an ambitious and boundary-pushing animated series. The series was nominated for nine Daytime Emmy Awards in 2017, winning more than any other animated or live-action television program that year. In its first three seasons, it has also received or been nominated for a BAFTA Award, several Annie Awards, Kidscreen Awards, Golden Reel Awards, and a Saturn Award. The show has also spawned several original children's books and has been adapted into a series of graphic novels by Marc Guggenheim and Richard Hamilton, released by Dark Horse Comics.

Anton Yelchin was part of the series through the first two seasons, as he had recorded enough dialogue to complete them before his sudden death. Yelchin was also able to provide a portion of dialogue for the final season, while the remaining portions of dialogue were recorded by Emile Hirsch.

Following the show's success, Guillermo del Toro announced that Trollhunters would be the first chapter in a trilogy of television series, collectively titled Tales of Arcadia. The story was continued in a science fiction inspired follow-up series entitled 3Below: Tales of Arcadia, and the trilogy concluded in a fantasy series entitled Wizards: Tales of Arcadia. It also premiered on Pop in the UK on September 3, 2018.

A full-length feature film, titled Trollhunters: Rise of the Titans, was released on July 21, 2021.

== Synopsis ==
=== Season 1 ===
When Jim Lake Jr. finds the Amulet of Daylight under a canal from the remains of a dead body, he embarks on an adventure of a lifetime protecting Arcadia from villains with the help of his human friends Toby and Claire, and his troll friends, Blinky, AAARRRGGHH!!!, and Draal.

=== Season 2 ===
With Jim trapped in the Darklands, his friends race to rescue him. With Jim out of the Darklands, he faces repercussions for his actions by going in. Blinky deals with old family wounds as the rest of Trollmarket deals with a possible mole among them. Things are not made easier when Steve Palchuk and Eli Pepperjack begin to stumble upon Jim's double life, on top of the pressures of high school.

=== Season 3 ===
It's the end of sophomore year at Arcadia High. Jim's double life has taken its toll on his mother as Claire experiences trouble from an ancient sorceress. Gunmar has taken control of the Heartstone Trollmarket. The great wizard Merlin turns Jim into a half troll.

== Voice cast ==
=== Main ===
- Anton Yelchin (episodes 1–41) and Emile Hirsch (episodes 42–52) as James "Jim" Lake Jr. / Trollhunter, the first human Trollhunter and a reluctant hero dealing with the pressures of leading a double life. He is kind-hearted, honorable, brave, heroic, and as such, cares a great deal about his mother and friends. Jim is also highly skilled at cooking, often preparing impressive meals for his mother and friends, especially Toby. Yelchin provided the voice of Jim from Part 1, through portions of Part 3 before his death. Hirsch assumed the role and replaced him.
- Charlie Saxton as Tobias "Toby" Domzalski, Jim's male best friend and confidant, an overweight Polish-American boy who lives with his grandmother. Dorky and excitable, he fully embraces the secret world of trolls and eagerly aids Jim in his quests. His weapon of choice is a warhammer.
- Lexi Medrano as Claire Maria Nuñez, Jim's female best friend/girlfriend, a feisty, irritable yet friendly and warm-hearted Mexican-American girl who is a talented martial artist and gymnast, using her skills to aid Jim in his quests. She obtains the Shadow Staff (Skathe-Hrün), a staff capable of creating portals activated by the user's emotions.
- Kelsey Grammer as Blinkous "Blinky" Galadrigal, Jim's six-eyed four-armed troll mentor. A wise and scholarly troll with a heart of gold, he serves as the brains of the Trollhunters and eventually becomes a sort of father figure to Jim.
- Jonathan Hyde as Waltolomew ‘Walter’ Stricklander ‘Strickler’, Jim's history teacher who is actually a Changeling. When Jim discovers the truth, in Young Atlas, he loses all respect for him and the two become bitter enemies. However, he remains affable toward Jim and has redeeming qualities.
- Fred Tatasciore as Aarghaumont "AAARRRGGHH!!!", a burly troll and close companion of Blinky, who forms a deep bond with Toby. He was kidnapped by the Gumm-Gumms as a child from the Krubera (a race of troll that lives deep in the earth) which stunted his vocabulary. Tormented by the atrocities he committed, he deserted Gunmar to live a life of peace (as shown in Wizards). However, he will still fight to protect those he cares about.
- Victor Raider-Wexler as Vendel, the leader of Trollmarket. An ancient and wizened troll, Vendel is at first suspicious of Jim and often comes across as a pessimist, but shows a softer side and eventual faith in Jim. At the end of Part 2, he is killed by Usurna after she reveals herself to be working for Gunmar, but not before recording the act to warn the Trollhunters.
- Ron Perlman as Bular, the son of Gunmar. A brutish and powerful troll warrior, he is obsessed with freeing his father from the Darklands. He holds a special disdain for Changelings, whom he considers "impure", putting him at odds with Strickler and other Changelings who seek to free Gunmar. He is killed by Jim in the first half of season 1, but later makes appearances in the season 1 episode "Where Is My Mind?" and the season 2 episode "Unbecoming".
- Clancy Brown as Gunmar, the iron-fisted leader of the Gumm-Gumms who reside in the Darklands. He is powerful and ruthless, and will readily dispose of loyal minions and allies who can no longer serve him. He has no qualms about enslaving or killing his fellow trolls to accomplish his goals. However, he cares deeply for his son, Bular. Despite his apparent main antagonist role, Gunmar in fact serves Morgana.
- Amy Landecker as Barbara Lake, Jim's protective and overworked single mother. Her husband left the family when Jim was five years old. Her job as a doctor means she's often away from home, which lets Jim pursue his Trollhunter duties. Jim's impressive cooking skills are most likely out of necessity as Barbara herself is bad at cooking.
- Steven Yeun as Steve Palchuk, a narcissistic jock who frequently bullies Jim. Suspicious of Jim's unusual behavior, he eventually discovers the truth and teams up with Eli Pepperjack becoming the Creepslayerz to help Jim in Part 2.
- Cole Sand as Eli Pepperjack, a nerdy classmate of Jim who believes in the paranormal. In Part 2, he teams up with Steve Palchuk to investigate the strange creatures they both have seen and to help Jim.

=== Recurring ===
- Matthew Waterson as Draal, the son of previous Trollhunter, Kanjigar. He is originally jealous and suspicious of Jim but later befriends him – acting as Jim's fighting tutor. During a battle in the museum, Draal sacrifices his lower right arm while removing the Trollhunter amulet from the Killahead Bridge to close the portal, and later obtains a mechanical prosthetic. Draal explains that his father kept a distance from him as he grew up, and he had hoped to become the next Trollhunter that he might earn his father's approval. He was killed by Angor Rot in season three.
- Lauren Tom as Nomura, the Changeling museum curator and a colleague of Strickler. Originally an antagonist, she was pulled into the Darklands and imprisoned by Gunmar for her failures. When Jim is captured in the Darklands, the two form a connection and escape together.
- Jimmie Wood as NotEnrique, the Changeling swapped with Claire's baby brother Enrique. While troublesome and self-serving, he isn't actively malicious and even helps the Trollhunters from time to time (usually after being bribed). He forms a rocky but brotherly connection with Claire.
- Tom Hiddleston and James Purefoy as Kanjigar the Courageous, Draal's father and the noble Trollhunter prior to Jim. His ghost tutors Jim, often worrying about Jim's team fighting style, believing that the Trollhunter must work alone to avoid endangering those he cares about – this leads to Jim's guilt and decision to venture into the Darklands alone. Hiddleston provided the voice acting for Kanjigar during the series premiere, while Foley was cast to assume the role for the rest of the series.
- Ike Amadi as Angor Rot, an ancient troll assassin who hunts down Trollhunters and takes their souls. In medieval times, Angor made a deal with Morgana, surrendering his own soul in return for his mystical powers.
- Rodrigo Blaas as Gnome Chompsky, a Gnome adopted by Toby. He started out as a "rogue Gnome" causing trouble, but after he was finally defeated by Jim he became friendly when he was given a dollhouse to live in and a plastic doll to be his companion. He later helps locate Enrique in the Darklands and also helps rescue Jim from the Darklands.
- Mark Hamill as Dictatious Galadrigal, Blinky's brother. Presumed dead, he helps Gunmar in his quest to conquer the surface lands. He is blinded by Blinky during a struggle in the Darklands.
- Anjelica Huston as Queen Usurna, the queen of the Krubera, AAARRRGGHH!!!'s race of trolls who lives in the Deep Caverns, and a member of a council of troll leaders known as the Tribunal. She initially seems to be a kind queen concerned for AAARRRGGHH!!!'s well-being. As a Tribunal member, she is strict and judgmental and leads the Tribunal to act against Jim and his friends. Late in Part 2, she reveals herself to be a traitor who works for Gunmar and helps him take over Trollmarket.
- Lena Headey as Morgan le Fay, an ancient and seemingly malevolent entity and the patron of Angor Rot.
- Laraine Newman as Lenora Janeth, the algebra and drama teacher of Arcadia Oaks High.
- Tom Kenny as Otto Scaarbach, a Changeling Polymorph who can change into the form of anyone. He is the Grand Commandant of the Janus Order, a secret society of Changelings who assist the Gumm-Gumms. He also voices Claire's father, Javier Nuñez, and Dadblank in 3Below and Rise of the Titans.
- David Bradley as Merlin, the wizard who created the Trollhunter's amulet.
- Colin O'Donoghue as Hisirdoux "Douxie" Casperan, a charming English teen from Arcadia Oaks Academy whose band, "Ash Dispersal Pattern", is an entrant in the Battle of the Bands in Part 3. In Rise of the Titans he is a major character, and a former apprentice (now he is a master wizard) to Merlin.
- Tatiana Maslany as Aja, a "foreign exchange student" from "Cantaloupia" and older sister to Krel. Jim is tasked to show them around and acclimate them to Arcadia late in Part 3. The character (alongside Krel) returns in Rise of the Titans.
- Diego Luna as Krel, younger brother to Aja. The character (alongside Aja) returns in Rise of the Titans.
- Yara Shahidi as Darci Scott, Jim, Toby and Claire's classmate.

== Production ==
=== Development ===
Initially, del Toro envisioned the idea as a live-action television series; however this was deemed impractical due to budgetary concerns, and as a result he instead turned the idea into a book. DreamWorks Animation optioned the book to develop as an animated feature film, to be directed by Guillermo del Toro and Rodrigo Blaas. Eventually, Netflix greenlit the project as a high-end animated series instead, eager to work with del Toro and expand their slate of original animated programming. Rodrigo Blaas became an executive producer and supervising director on the series.

Del Toro modeled the show's sensibilities after shows he grew up with such as Jonny Quest, identifying them as "really earnest and emotionally beautiful". To this end, he sought to make the main character of Jim "in that '70s mold," and "really a very good boy" with del Toro noting that this was a constant struggle for him to express. Eventually he came across Anton Yelchin, who embodied those qualities although by del Toro's estimate it still took him a few sessions to fully understand the character.

=== Writing ===
When creating the show's narrative, Guillermo del Toro noted that he and the writers wanted a "bittersweet journey" for the main character dealing with issues that most such "power fantasies" failed to address, telling Indiewire, "... I wanted to say, 'Look, you can be in high school and you can have your problems. Then you get all these powers and then you have a different set of problems. There is not such a thing as a final, great outcome.'"

The writing team remained small and consistent throughout its entire fifty-two episode run, allowing Marc Guggenheim, The Hageman Brothers, Aaron Waltke, Chad Quandt, and A.C. Bradley to build out all three seasons in advance of the show's premiere without interruption. This provided the writers a rare opportunity for an unusual amount of intricate planning and plot serialization to be woven throughout the series, including details planted for secrets that wouldn't be revealed until seasons later, sometimes even hinting at storylines for future installments of Tales of Arcadia that wouldn't be announced until years afterward.

=== Cast ===
The show serves as one of Yelchin's final projects as he died shortly after recording most of his character's dialogue. Producer del Toro refused to replace his recordings, which del Toro noted was a challenge for the show's recording engineers. Of his decision, del Toro stated that the actor "was proud of what he did, and we were so proud of how he did it." Del Toro added that his experience as a father and Yelchin's young age were also factors that led to the decision. Some roles were written specifically for the actors who eventually portrayed them. In the earliest sketch for the series in one of del Toro's notebooks, the character of Blinky was drawn with Kelsey Grammer's name next to it, who accepted the role when the series was eventually greenlit.

== Episodes ==
=== Series overview ===
Season	Episodes	Originally released
1	26	December 23, 2016
2	13	December 15, 2017
3	13	May 25, 2018

=== Season 1 (2016) ===
No. overall	No. in season	Title	Directed by	Written by	Original release date
Part 1
1–2	1–2	"Becoming"	Guillermo del Toro & Rodrigo Blaas	Story by : Guillermo del Toro, Marc Guggenheim & Rodrigo Blaas; Teleplay by : Guillermo del Toro & Marc Guggenheim	December 23, 2016
On the Californian town of Arcadia Oaks, Trollhunter Kanjigar fights Bular under a bridge moments before sunrise. He is mortally wounded by him, and taking advantage of the fact that trolls turn into stone when in contact with sunlight, he sacrifices himself in order to stop Bular from retrieving the amulet. Meanwhile, James "Jim" Lake Jr. and Tobias "Toby" Domzalski hurriedly ride their bicycles to school, taking the canals en route. There, Jim finds the amulet in the pile of stones. He innocently takes it, before resuming their ride to school. There, he tries to talk to his crush, Claire Nuñez, who tells about the auditions for the Romeo and Juliet school play. He and Toby also find school bully Steve Palchuk bullying Eli Pepperjack, who claims he saw monsters with stone for skin. Jim tries to intervene, along with Toby and the surrounding students, forcing Steve to stop when their gym teacher, Coach Lawrence, ultimately intervenes as well. On way home, the duo meet Jim's mother, a doctor named Barbara. At home, Jim plays around with the amulet he found earlier; however, he is alarmed by noises in the basement. There, he stumbles upon two trolls: six-eyed Blinkous "Blinky" Galadrigal and humongous AAAARRRGGHH!!!, who try to explain to him that the Amulet chose him to be the next Trollhunter, but not before Jim fainted. The next day, Jim is clearly confused by the events yesterday. He is noticed by his history teacher, Mr. Strickler, who offers him some advice. At home, he further investigates the Amulet. Upon reading the incantation written at the Amulet itself, a shiny armor magically appears and encases him, along with a large sword. Meanwhile, Mr. Strickler goes to the canals, finds the pile of stones, and learns that the Amulet is gone. His eyes glow as he informs Bular that the Amulet has found the next Trollhunter. Jim tells Toby during one of his periodic visits to the dentist. At home, he recites the incantation, revealing the armor and sword to Toby. Chaos ensues as Blinky and AAARRRGGHH!!! reveal themselves to Toby. However, this is cut short when they hear Barbara coming home. The two trolls explain the current situation – that Jim is now the Trollhunter and his predecessor was killed by Bular, who is now seeking him. At school, Jim unexpectedly transforms into his armor. He and Toby are caught by Mr. Strickler, and they explain that it's for the tryouts for the Romeo and Juliet play. Jim eventually goes to the tryouts with the armor on, and recites a speech Blinky had said, landing him the role of Romeo. He is praised by Claire, the play's Juliet, for his performance on the tryouts afterwards. On way home, he and Toby are ambushed by Bular. They meet with Blinky and AAARRRGGHH!!!, who lead them to the underground troll town of Heartstone Trollmarket.
3	3	"Wherefore Art Thou, Trollhunter?"	Rodrigo Blaas & Johane Matte	Marc Guggenheim	December 23, 2016
At Trollmarket, Jim and Toby are given a tour by Blinky and AAARRRGGHH!!!. The humans' presence isn't received well by the trolls, including Draal, the son of the previous Trollhunter. The group then goes to the Heroes' Forge, the training grounds of the Trollhunters. There, Jim's training starts. However, they are visited by Vendel, Trollmarket's leader, who suggests the human Trollhunter should use the Soothscryer to judge his worthiness. Due to the unique case of Jim, the Soothscryer doesn't release a judgment. Back home, Jim is surprised by Mr. Strickler's sudden visit. During Jim's training with Blinky, Draal offers a spar with Jim. Blinky refused, but Vendel allows it. The spar ends with Draal winning. The loss takes a heavy toll on Jim, who refuses to become a Trollhunter. During a rehearsal for the play, Claire is concerned for Jim's well being and tries to give some advice. Steve confronts Jim, which ends with Jim landing a single punch on him after he remembers Blinky's advice. Rejuvenated, he visits Trollmarket and requests a rematch with Draal.
4	4	"Gnome Your Enemy"	Elaine Bogan	Story by : Dan Hageman & Kevin Hageman; Teleplay by : A.C. Bradley, Chad Quandt & Aaron Waltke	December 23, 2016
Jim gets a crash course in troll history and is faced with problems, his first mission, and a bully.
5	5	"Waka Chaka!"	Elaine Bogan	Story by : Dan Hageman & Kevin Hageman; Teleplay by : Chad Quandt & Aaron Waltke	December 23, 2016
During a field trip to a museum, Jim tries to get closer to Claire; Jim discovers that the museum curator is a troll shapeshifter.
6	6	"Win Lose or Draal"	Rodrigo Blaas & Johane Matte	Story by : Dan Hageman & Kevin Hageman; Teleplay by : A.C. Bradley	December 23, 2016
Jim gets ready for a high-stakes rematch against Draal, who seems to be the amulet's rightful heir; after saving his life, a surprising partnership emerges.
7	7	"To Catch a Changeling"	Simon Otto	Story by : Dan Hageman & Kevin Hageman; Teleplay by : Marc Guggenheim	December 23, 2016
With the help of an ancient troll-hunting tool (an iron horseshoe called a "gaggletack"), Jim and Toby try to unmask the changeling trolls living among them; Claire presents Jim with a tempting offer.
8	8	"Adventures in Trollsitting"	Rodrigo Blaas & Johane Matte	Story by : Dan Hageman & Kevin Hageman; Teleplay by : A.C. Bradley, Chad Quandt & Aaron Waltke	December 23, 2016
Draal gets accustomed to his new digs in Jim's basement; Jim tries to find out if Claire's little brother, Enrique, is a changeling.
9	9	"Bittersweet Sixteen"	Elaine Bogan	Story by : Dan Hageman & Kevin Hageman; Teleplay by : A.C. Bradley, Chad Quandt & Aaron Waltke	December 23, 2016
Jim's sixteenth birthday is full of surprises, including the arrival of a new species of flying troll, called a stalkling, that is immune to the effects of sunlight.
10	10	"Young Atlas"	Andrew L. Schmidt	Story by : Dan Hageman & Kevin Hageman; Teleplay by : Chad Quandt & Aaron Waltke	December 23, 2016
Draal gives Jim a totem to help lessen his anxiety about Claire; Jim's resulting overconfidence leads him to a startling realization: Strickler is a changeling.
11	11	"Recipe for Disaster"	Elaine Bogan	Story by : Dan Hageman & Kevin Hageman; Teleplay by : A.C. Bradley	December 23, 2016
Claire's suspicions grow; Jim's mother invites Strickler over for a tension-filled dinner. In Strickler's office, Toby discovers that the changeling is hiding a miniature portal to the Darklands.
12	12	"Claire and Present Danger"	Andrew L. Schmidt	Story by : Dan Hageman & Kevin Hageman; Teleplay by : A.C. Bradley, Chad Quandt & Aaron Waltke	December 23, 2016
The door to the Darklands still won't open, even though the Killahead bridge is complete. When Claire becomes a target, Jim is forced tell her the truth. She does not believe him until they are attacked by goblins. Gnome Chompsky volunteers to venture into the Darklands, but quickly gets lost.
13	13	"The Battle of Two Bridges"	Rodrigo Blaas & Johane Matte	Dan Hageman & Kevin Hageman	December 23, 2016
Two battles unfold when Strickler and Bular attempt to make Jim unlock the portal and free Gunmar and his army from the Darklands. In the end, Bular is killed on the canal bridge and Draal's right arm is turned to stone when he removes the Amulet of Daylight from Killahead Bridge, replaced by a mechanical prosthetic.
14	14	"Return of the Trollhunter"	Elaine Bogan	Story by : Dan Hageman & Kevin Hageman; Teleplay by : A.C. Bradley, Chad Quandt & Aaron Waltke	December 23, 2016
Claire visits the Heartstone Trollmarket for the first time, Jim receives a ghostly summons, and Strickler rouses an ancient assassin.
15	15	"Mudslinging"	Rodrigo Blaas	Story by : Dan Hageman & Kevin Hageman; Teleplay by : Marc Guggenheim	December 23, 2016
Jim looks for a way to destroy Gunmar so Claire can bring her brother home. A power-hungry Strickler returns to Arcadia with assassin Angor Rot, taking the place of Jim's late school principal.
16	16	"Roaming Fees May Apply"	Andrew L. Schmidt	Story by : Dan Hageman & Kevin Hageman and Chad Quandt & Aaron Waltke; Teleplay by : A.C. Bradley, Dan Hageman & Kevin Hageman and Chad Quandt & Aaron Waltke	December 23, 2016
The heroes go on a dangerous quest to Gatto, a massive mountain troll, in search of the first Triumbric Stone (the Birthstone), one of three stones linked to Gunmar's lifeforce. Angor Rot creates a charm that links Barbara and Strickler's fates.
17	17	"Blinky's Day Out"	Elaine Bogan	A.C. Bradley, Dan Hageman & Kevin Hageman and Chad Quandt & Aaron Waltke	December 23, 2016
Due to exposure to a strange elixir, Blinky turns into a human and experiences the highs and lows of his new form. Angor Rot marks Jim for a fate that is far worse than death.
18	18	"The Shattered King"	Rodrigo Blaas & Johane Matte	Story by : Dan Hageman & Kevin Hageman; Teleplay by : A.C. Bradley	December 23, 2016
Jim's armor receives an upgrade thanks to Vendal and the Birthstone. Claire wants Jim to be her dance partner as the heroes look for the second Triumbric Stone; they wind up in unfamiliar marshlands and tailed by Angor Rot, where Toby pretends to be a troll king. In the end, Angor Rot gets the so-called Killstone, symbol of Gunmar's first kill, but Claire gains Angor's magical Shadow Staff.
19	19	"Airheads"	Andrew L. Schmidt	Story by : Dan Hageman & Kevin Hageman; Teleplay by : Chad Quandt & Aaron Waltke	December 23, 2016
Toby and Claire are constantly fighting because Claire got the Shadow Staff and Toby feels slighted. Toby and Claire tackle a Trollhunter task so Jim can win a Spring King challenge. In the process, Toby gets cursed, but Vendal ultimately contains it in Toby's new warhammer.
20	20	"Where Is My Mind?"	Elaine Bogan	Story by : Dan Hageman & Kevin Hageman; Teleplay by : A.C. Bradley	December 23, 2016
When a horde of pixies descends on Arcadia Oaks High, the students are sent into a tailspin. AAAARRRRGGHH!!! learns that he was injected with Angor Rot's Sun Poison, which will gradually turn him to stone, but he chooses not to tell his friends. Angor has a surprising proposal for Jim.
21	21	"Party Monster"	Rodrigo Blaas	Story by : Dan Hageman & Kevin Hageman; Teleplay by : Chad Quandt & Aaron Waltke	December 23, 2016
NonEnrique throws a party for the trolls of Arcadia in Claire's house, putting Claire in a quandary as she has already invited her two best friends to her home. Jim and Toby want to take Strickler's ring, the Inferna Copula.
22	22	"It's About Time"	Andrew L. Schmidt	Story by : Dan Hageman & Kevin Hageman; Teleplay by : Chad Quandt & Aaron Waltke and Marc Guggenheim	December 23, 2016
In a flashback at the beginning of the episode, we learn how Angor Rot visited the mysterious "Lady Pale" and traded his soul, which is contained in her ring - the Inferna Copula - for his powers. Jim uses a rare time-stopping Kairosect (taken from Gatto) to save Claire from getting hit by a truck; rescue Blinky, who is turning back into a troll in front of Barbara; steal Strickler's ring; and take back the second Triumbric Stone from Angor Rot. When the Kairosect's time limit runs out, Jim is confronted by a betrayed Angor, who accidentally destroys the ring, dissipating his soul. He attempts to kill Jim, who escapes, and then pursues Stricker.
23	23	"Wingmen"	Elaine Bogan	Story by : Dan Hageman & Kevin Hageman; Teleplay by : A.C. Bradley	December 23, 2016
A troll queen, AAAARRRRGGHH!!!'s former ruler, arrives at Troll Market, and AAAARRRRGGHH!!!'s devastating secret is revealed. Despite being given the chance to return to his home caves and get healed, he chooses to remain with his friends. Abandoned by his Changeling companions, Strickler asks for Jim's protection.
24	24	"Angor Management"	Rodrigo Blaas	Story by : Dan Hageman & Kevin Hageman; Teleplay by : Chad Quandt & Aaron Waltke	December 23, 2016
Jim reluctantly joins forces with Strickler to keep Barbara alive, and they prepare an ambush in Jim's house. Barbara returns unexpectedly and learns the truth about Jim and Strickland's secret double lives. Anger Rot, who has spied on them, circumvents the booby traps and attacks, forcing them to retreat to Trollmarket. Blinky, Claire, Toby and AAAARRRRGGHH!!! begin searching for the Eyestone, Gunmar's lost eye and the last of the Triumbric Stones. Gnome Chompksy returns with important news regarding Enrique and a sinister message from Gunmar to Jim.
25	25	"A Night to Remember"	Andrew L. Schmidt	Story by : A.C. Bradley, Dan Hageman & Kevin Hageman; Teleplay by : Marc Guggenheim	December 23, 2016
To save Barbara's life, Jim races to break the spell that bonds her to Strickler. Angor Rot attacks Claire and Toby at the Spring Fling, when they look for the incantation to break the spell in Strickland's office. Barbara forgets about the trolls' existence due to the spell being broken, but Angor Rot gains the Horngeazle - the key to Trollmarket.
26	26	"Something Rotten This Way Comes"	Elaine Bogan	Story by : Dan Hageman & Kevin Hageman; Teleplay by : A.C. Bradley	December 23, 2016
Jim, his friends and the trolls brace for Angor Rot's onslaught, using Angor's stolen eye to enhance Jim's armor. AAAARRRRGGHH!!! takes Rot's Sun Poison dagger for Toby, turning him fully to stone, before Jim, Toby and Claire kill Angor, releasing the Trollhunter souls he had captured. Jim incorporates the Eyestone into his amulet to upgrade his armor to the scarlet Eclipse Armor before venturing into the Darklands to confront Gunmar.

=== Season 2 (2017) ===
No. overall	No. in season	Title	Directed by	Written by	Original release date
Part 2
27	1	"Escape from the Darklands"	Rodrigo Blaas	Story by : Dan Hageman & Kevin Hageman; Teleplay by : A.C. Bradley, Dan Hageman & Kevin Hageman and Chad Quandt & Aaron Waltke	December 15, 2017
With Jim still trapped in the Darklands searching for Enrique, his friends rally to bring him back. But the Troll Tribunal has other ideas. In the Darklands, Jim is pursued by a mysterious, hooded figure, who reveals itself to be Dictatious, Blinky's brother, thought to be dead and now working for Gunmar.
28	2	"Skullcrusher"	Andrew L. Schmidt	Story by : Dan Hageman & Kevin Hageman; Teleplay by : Chad Quandt & Aaron Waltke	December 15, 2017
Claire recruits NotEnrique for a secret mission to return the pieces of the Kilahead bridge, while bully Steve stirs up trouble at school. In the Darklands, Jim meets Gunmar "the Skullcrusher"
29	3	"Grand Theft Otto"	Andrew L. Schmidt	Story by : A.C. Bradley, Dan Hageman & Kevin Hageman; Teleplay by : A.C. Bradley	December 15, 2017
Nomora, who is now a prisoner of Gunmar, comes to Jim's aid in the Darklands. Back in Arcadia, Toby's distracting new headgear picks up signals from the Janus Order.
30	4	"KanjigAAARRRGGHH!!!"	Johane Matte	Story by : Dan Hageman & Kevin Hageman; Teleplay by : Chad Quandt & Aaron Waltke	December 15, 2017
As Gunmar readies to destroy Jim in the Darklands, Blinky and the gang strike a deal with the Janus Order in their quest to revive AAARRRRGGHH!!!, stealing Vendal's Heartstone staff. When AAARRRGGHH!!! is resurrected, Kanjigar possesses his body to open the Kilahead Bridge.
31	5	"Homecoming"	Rodrigo Blaas	Story by : Marc Guggenheim, Dan Hageman & Kevin Hageman; Teleplay by : A.C. Bradley	December 15, 2017
Blinky blinds Dictatious while Jim and Nomoura are forced to fight while Gunmar looks on; Draal leaves his post guarding the bridge, saving Jim, Nomoura, and the rescue team's lives from attacking Gumm-Gumms, but allowing Gunmar, Dictatious, a handful of Gumm-Gumms, and some blood goblins to escape.
32	6	"Hiss Hiss, Bang Bang"	Elaine Bogan	Story by : Dan Hageman & Kevin Hageman and Lila Scott; Teleplay by : Lila Scott	December 15, 2017
Now out of the Darklands and readjusting to life in Arcadia, Jim and the team must face the consequences of their risky actions. A trio of escaped blood goblins attack Gnome Chompsky.
33	7	"Hero with a Thousand Faces"	Rodrigo Blaas	Story by : Dan Hageman & Kevin Hageman and Chad Quandt & Aaron Waltke; Teleplay by : Chad Quandt & Aaron Waltke	December 15, 2017
Multiple problems plague a frazzled Jim when his amulet repeatedly duplicates him while Claire invites him to meet her parents at a family barbecue.
34	8	"Just Add Water"	Andrew L. Schmidt	Story by : Dan Hageman & Kevin Hageman; Teleplay by : A.C. Bradley	December 15, 2017
When an oozy Gruesome shows up in Arcadia, Jim and the gang set out to find it – while playing parents to two sacks of flour for a school assignment.
35	9	"Creepslayerz"	Elaine Bogan	Story by : Dan Hageman & Kevin Hageman; Teleplay by : Chad Quandt & Aaron Waltke	December 15, 2017
During this revealing flashback episode, Jim and his friends search for the oozy Gruesome as a paranoid Steve finds an unlikely ally in Eli Pepperjack.
36	10	"The Reckless Club"	Rodrigo Blaas	Story by : Dan Hageman & Kevin Hageman; Teleplay by : A.C. Bradley & Lila Scott	December 15, 2017
Señor Uhl sentences Jim and his friends to detention (in which they parody The Breakfast Club) while Queen Usurna gathers evidence of a conspiracy. Draal comes face to face with Gunmar.
37	11	"Unbecoming"	Andrew L. Schmidt	Story by : Dan Hageman & Kevin Hageman; Teleplay by : Chad Quandt & Aaron Waltke	December 15, 2017
After being arrested by Queen Usurna, Jim meets Unkar the Unfortunate, a former Trollhunter, and is unwillingly given the chance to see what his life would be like without the amulet, after which he meets the wizard Merlin.
38	12	"Mistrial and Error"	Elaine Bogan	Story by : Dan Hageman & Kevin Hageman; Teleplay by : Marc Guggenheim	December 15, 2017
Jim stands trial for unleashing Gunmar while his friends race to uncover Gunmar's mole in Trollmarket. When convicted, Jim is sent to "The Deep", a dark realm of no return. Vendal and Usurna speak of Claire and Blinky's discoveries.
39	13	"In the Hall of the Gumm-Gumm King"	Rodrigo Blaas	Dan Hageman & Kevin Hageman	December 15, 2017
Vendal's death carries a warning from beyond the grave as Gunmar, with the help of the traitorous Usurna, takes control of the Heartstone and Trollmarket. Claire nearly dies when she makes a massive shadow portal to evacuate Trollmarket while and Steve and Eli help the trolls get to safety. A possessed Claire brings the Pale Lady the remains of Angor Rot at the end of the episode.

=== Season 3 (2018) ===
No. overall	No. in season	Title	Directed by	Written by	Original release date
Part 3
40	1	"Night Patroll"	Andrew L. Schmidt	Dan Hageman & Kevin Hageman	May 25, 2018
With the trolls hiding out in Arcadia, AAARRRGGHH!!! goes undercover to see what Gunmar is up to. Douxie as a potential rival with Claire brings out Jim's jealous side as Strickler trains Jim. An ancient voice speaks to Dictatious out of the Janus Order's old gramophone.
41	2	"Arcadia's Most Wanted"	Elaine Bogan	Story by : Dan Hageman & Kevin Hageman; Teleplay by : Chad Quandt & Aaron Waltke	May 25, 2018
Toby gets caught in the crosshairs when a troll goes missing and the city cracks down on crime. The ancient voice of the Pale Lady refuses to be silenced. Note: Anton Yelchin's last full episode as voice of Jim Lake jr.
42	3	"Bad Coffee"	Johane Matte	Story by : Dan Hageman & Kevin Hageman; Teleplay by : A.C. Bradley	May 25, 2018
Something strange is brewing at school, where the teachers are more agitated than usual. Claire's illness shows disturbing side effects. Note: Emile Hirsch's first episode as voice of Jim Lake jr..
43	4	"So I'm Dating a Sorceress"	Andrew L. Schmidt	Story by : Dan Hageman & Kevin Hageman; Teleplay by : Lila Scott	May 25, 2018
Toby and Darci ask Jim and Claire on a double date. Gunmar returns from his travels, now armed with the knowledge to bring forth the Eternal Night. Unfortunately, Claire becomes possessed by the Pale Lady, Morgana le Fay.
44	5	"The Exorcism of Claire Nuñez"	Rodrigo Blaas	Story by : Dan Hageman & Kevin Hageman; Teleplay by : Chad Quandt & Aaron Waltke	May 25, 2018
While Gunmar searches for the Staff of Avalon, Jim and Toby head into the Shadow Realm to rescue Claire's spirit and return it to her body, before it's too late and the Eldritch Queen possesses her forever.
45	6	"Parental Guidance"	Elaine Bogan	Story by : Dan Hageman & Kevin Hageman; Teleplay by : A.C. Bradley	May 25, 2018
When Barbara's art obsession leads to her remembering about Trollmarket, she demands Jim tell her and Toby's Nana and Claire's parents the truth. Dictatious reveals Gunmar's plans to resurrect Angor Rot. After goblins attack, Claire falls into the shadow realm and discovers Angor Rot has returned, along with the way to Merlin's tomb: breaking Jim's amulet.
46	7	"The Oath"	Andrew L. Schmidt	Story by : Dan Hageman & Kevin Hageman; Teleplay by : Chad Quandt & Aaron Waltke	May 25, 2018
The team shadow-jumps to where a trollnapped AAARRRGGHH!!! is trapped before finding an ancient Gyre. Jim breaks his amulet to power the gyre and Draal is freed from Gunmar's control since no magic can work in Merlin's tomb. Gunmar steals Merlin's Staff of Avalon, causing the tomb to start to break apart, abandoning Angor Rot, who kills Draal.
47	8	"For the Glory of Merlin"	Elaine Bogan	Story by : Dan Hageman & Kevin Hageman; Teleplay by : Marc Guggenheim	May 25, 2018
A long-dormant Merlin shows Jim and his friends what really happened at the Battle of Killahead, Gunmar finds where Morganna is imprisoned using the Staff of Avalon, and Angor Rot plots his revenge.
48	9	"In Good Hands"	Johane Matte	Story by : Dan Hageman & Kevin Hageman; Teleplay by : Lila Scott	May 25, 2018
Gunmar tries to use the Staff of Avalon to release Morgana but realizes that the staff needs a human to speak the incantation. Meanwhile, Merlin wants Jim, Claire & Toby to gather three mysterious items while Blinky & AAARRRGGHH acquire others. At school, Jim & Toby enter Strickler's old office to acquire the Antramonstrum shell but when Senior Uhl enters in his office, Jim tries to distract him while Toby flees with the shell. Seeing that Jim missed countless days of school, Uhl gives Jim the task of showing siblings and new students, Aja and Krel Tarron, around Arcadia. In the museum, Queen Usurna tries to convince Nomura to speak the incantation of the staff but she refuses and escapes. After acquiring the bones at the Janus Order's changelings, Aja & Krel offer to help Jim and his friends to get lighting in a bottle, in which they use the Sword of Daylight as a conductor. Worried about Nomura, Strickler & Barbara go to the museum to find her but are ambushed by Gumm-Gumms and captured by Usurna. Jim, Claire & Toby return to Jim's home where Merlin uses Jim's Vespa to craft armor for both Toby & Claire. He then reveals to Jim, Claire, Toby, Blinky & AAARRRGGHH that he is not here to stop Gunmar but to kill Morgana, leaving a shock on each of the Trollhunter's faces. Note: This episode is connected with 3Below: Tales of Arcadia episode "Lightning in a Bottle".
49	10	"A House Divided"	Andrew L. Schmidt	Story by : Dan Hageman & Kevin Hageman; Teleplay by : A.C. Bradley	May 25, 2018
Merlin has a plan to go to war, but it is Jim's choice to make. Blinky and AAARRRGGHH!!! search for allies. After Gatto refuses to join them, they are captured by the Quagwumps and Usurna's Krubera. Gunmar uses Barbara to get what he wants from Strickler and releases Morgana. Jim submerges himself in Merlin's potion made from the ingredients he, Toby, Claire, and Aja and Krel gathered to become a half-troll.
50	11	"Jimhunters"	Johane Matte	Story by : Dan Hageman & Kevin Hageman; Teleplay by : Chad Quandt & Aaron Waltke	May 25, 2018
A greatly changed Jim renews his Trollhunter training but struggles to accept his new reality. Blinky and AAARRRGGHH!!! convince the Quagwumps and Krubera to join them and kill Queen Usurna. Gunmar and Morgana rally the troops for the final battle before Morgana destroys half the army for her spell. She then begins the Eternal Night.
51–52	12–13	"The Eternal Knight"	Guillermo del Toro & Rodrigo Blaas	Story by : Dan Hageman & Kevin Hageman; Teleplay by : A.C. Bradley & Marc Guggenheim (Part 1) Chad Quandt & Aaron Waltke and Lila Scott (Part 2)	May 25, 2018
It is Battle of the Bands in Arcadia, but when Gunmar prepares his Gumm-Gumm army for an attack on Arcadia, the team form a plan at Jim's house to put an end to the threat of Morgana, with Merlin and AAARRRGGHH!!! setting out to Trollmarket to stop Morgana while the rest of the team warns the town of the upcoming danger, and Jim waits in his house for the nightfall. When the Eternal Night has finally begun, covering Arcadia in shadow, Merlin and AAARRRGGHH!!! arrive in Trollmarket to fight Morgana, but Merlin discovers his powers were drained from his staff. In Arcadia, Jim arrives and the team with the reinforced army of trolls begin to fight the Gumm-Gumms. During the battle, Gunmar and Angor Rot arrive and the newly transformed Jim unleashes his fury to an ultimate showdown. With the eclipse still rising, with the almost-beaten Merlin struggling to stop the powerful Morgana and Jim battling Gunmar and Angor Rot, the team still fights the Gumm-Gumms in Arcadia. Jim is pinned down by Angor Rot before reminding him of his past life. He is nearly defeated and about to be controlled by Gunmar's Decimaar Blade, but Jim uses his amulet to increase his strength to hold back Gunmar, then finally striking him down with a final blow, destroying him and all his Gumm-Gumms in Arcadia. As the eclipse continues to rise, Morgana arrives to fight the Trollhunters, who are no match for her. Angor Rot returns in battle to help Jim take down Morgana, but Morgana cannot be killed by Jim's Eclipse Blade, which she shatters, before trying to destroy the team. Jim sacrifices himself to save them. Claire uses her Shadow Staff to push Morgana into a shadow portal, but Morgana destroys a dying Angor and Claire and Morgana get swirled into the portal. Claire tries to escape the portal and Morgana, throwing her Shadow Staff for Toby to use his warhammer to destroy it, freeing Claire and imprisoning Morgana. The injured Jim awakens and Merlin uses the Staff of Avalon to end the Eternal Night. The Heartstone in Trollmarket is now destroyed so Jim, Merlin and the trolls begin to travel to New Jersey where another Heartstone is located. At sunset, Jim, Claire, Merlin and the trolls began their long journey away from Toby, AAARRRGGHH!!!, Gnome Chompsky, Strickler, and Jim's mother. Note: In the end of the episode, Jim's words were spoken from the second episode ("Becoming: Part 2") and it is announced this series is dedicated to the deceased Anton Yelchin (the original voice actor of the character).

== Trollhunters: Rise of the Titans ==
Trollhunters: Rise of the Titans is a full-length feature film, taking place a year after the events of Wizards: Tales of Arcadia, released on July 21, 2021.

The Guardians of Arcadia reunite and plan their attack against the nefarious Arcane Order. After a failed attempt to destroy the Genesis Seals, the Arcane Order has reawakened the primordial Titans and they are seeking to combine with the heartstone at the center of the universe (which is Arcadia Oaks). As the heroes manage to defeat one titan at the cost of another titan, who is on the side of the heroes, they all come in Arcadia Oaks, and their leader, Jim Lake Jr ultimately pulls Excalibur off from the stone, and in new armor, he manages to kill the final member of the Arcane Order, Bellroc, saving the world but at the cost of his best friend, Toby Domzaski. Jim then travels back in time to the morning where he found the amulet and allows Toby to take over the mantle of the trollhunter.

== Release ==
The two-episode pilot of the series premiered on October 8, 2016, at the New York Comic Con. The first season consisted of 26 half-hour episodes which were released worldwide on Netflix on December 23, 2016. The second season, consisting of 13 episodes, was released on December 15, 2017. The third and final season, consisting of 13 episodes, was released on May 25, 2018.

=== Home media ===
The first season of Trollhunters was released on DVD on November 7, 2017.

== Reception ==
=== Critical response ===
Trollhunters has received critical acclaim and positive reviews from critics and viewers. The review aggregator website Rotten Tomatoes reported a 94% approval rating based on 16 reviews for the first season. The website's consensus reads, "Trollhunters manages to capture del Toro's enthusiasm for telling monster stories, in a youthful and more colorful fashion that may well earn him a new generation of fans." On Metacritic, the season has a normalized score of 69 out of 100 based on 9 critics, indicating "generally favorable reviews".

In 2017, it received six Daytime Emmys, more than any other television program, animated or live action, that year.

The second season of Trollhunters was nominated for six Annie Awards, tied for the most nominations of any television program in 2018. It was also nominated for four Daytime Emmy Awards, including Best Children's Animated Series, and won the Emmy for Outstanding Writing in an Animated Program.

On January 30, 2017, Trollhunters writers Kevin and Dan Hageman stated that the series is the most successful Netflix original show to date that is targeted at a younger audience.

=== Accolades ===
Year	Award	Category	Nominee(s)	Result
2017	Annie Awards	Outstanding Achievement, Character Animation in an Animated Television/Broadcast Production	Mike Chaffe for character Blinky in "Becoming, Part 1"	Won
2017	Annie Awards	Outstanding Achievement, Character Design in an Animated TV/Broadcast Production	Victor Maldonado, Alfredo Torres and Jules Rigolle, "Win, Lose or Draal"	Won
2017	Annie Awards	Outstanding Achievement, Music in an Animated TV/Broadcast Production	Alexandre Desplat and Tim Davies, "Becoming, Part 1"	Nominated
2017	Annie Awards	Outstanding Achievement, Storyboarding in an Animated TV/Broadcast Production	Hyunjoo Song, "Win, Lose or Draal"	Won
2017	Saturn Awards	Best Animated Series or Film on Television	Trollhunters	Nominated
2017	Behind the Voice Actors Awards	Best Male Lead Vocal Performance in a Television Series	Anton Yelchin, for Jim Lake Jr.	Won
2017	Behind the Voice Actors Awards	Best Female Lead Vocal Performance in a Television Series	Lexi Medrano, for Claire Nuñez	Nominated
2017	Behind the Voice Actors Awards	Best Female Vocal Performance in a Television Series in a Supporting Role	Laraine Newman, for Miss Janeth	Nominated
2017	Behind the Voice Actors Awards	Best Female Vocal Performance in a Television Series in a Guest Role	Anjelica Huston, for Queen Usurna	Nominated
2017	Daytime Emmy Awards	Outstanding Individual Achievement in Character Animation	Mike Chaffe, "Becoming, Part 1"	Won
2017	Daytime Emmy Awards	Outstanding Individual Achievement in Character Design	Victor Maldonado, "Win, Lose Or Draal"	Won
2017	Daytime Emmy Awards	Outstanding Special Class Animated Program	Guillermo del Toro, Rodrigo Blaas, Marc Guggenheim, Chad Hammes, Christina Steinberg, Dan Hageman, Kevin Hageman and Lawrence Jonas	Nominated
2017	Daytime Emmy Awards	Outstanding Performer in an Animated Program	Kelsey Grammer for playing Blinky	Won
2017	Daytime Emmy Awards	Outstanding Casting for an Animated Series or Special	Mary Hidalgo and Ania O'Hare, CSA	Won
2017	Daytime Emmy Awards	Outstanding Writing in an Animated Program	Marc Guggenheim	Won
2017	Daytime Emmy Awards	Outstanding Directing in an Animated Program	Rodrigo Blaas and Guillermo del Toro	Won
2017	Daytime Emmy Awards	Outstanding Main Title and Graphic Design	Rodrigo Blaas, Andy Erekson, Jonathan Catalan, Dai Weier, John Laus, David M.V. Jones	Nominated
2017	Daytime Emmy Awards	Outstanding Sound Mixing – Animation	Matthew Thomas Hall and Carlos Sanches, CAS	Nominated
2018	Annie Awards	Outstanding Achievement, Character Animation in an Animated Television/Broadcast Production	Bruno Chiou, Yi-Fan Cho, Kevin Jong, Chun-Jung Chu, "Homecoming"	Won
2018	Annie Awards	Outstanding Achievement, Character Design in an Animated Television/Broadcast Production	Jules Rigolle, Alfredo Torres, Linda Chen, Rustam Hasanov, Alfonso Blaas, "Escape from the Darklands"	Nominated
2018	Annie Awards	Outstanding Achievement, Directing in an Animated Television/Broadcast Production	Andrew Schmidt, "Unbecoming"	Nominated
2018	Annie Awards	Outstanding Achievement, Storyboarding in an Animated Television/Broadcast Production	David Woo, "Hero with a Thousand Faces"	Nominated
2018	Annie Awards	Outstanding Achievement, Storyboarding in an Animated Television/Broadcast Production	Hyunjoo Song, "In the Hall of the Gumm-Gumm King"	Nominated
2018	Annie Awards	Outstanding Achievement, Writing in an Animated Television/Broadcast Production	A.C. Bradley, Kevin Hageman, Dan Hageman, Aaron Waltke, Chad Quandt, "Escape from the Darklands"	Nominated
2018	Kidscreen Awards	Best New Series, Kids Category	Trollhunters	Won
2018	Kidscreen Awards	Best Writing	Trollhunters	Won
2018	Kidscreen Awards	Best Animation	Trollhunters	Won
2018	Golden Reel Award	Outstanding Achievement in Sound Editing, Animation Short Form	Matthew Hall, Jason Oliver, Goeun Lee, MPSE, James Miller, Carlos Sanches, Aran Tanchum, Vincent Guisetti	Nominated
2018	Daytime Emmy Awards	Outstanding Children's Animated Series	Guillermo del Toro, Marc Guggenheim, Chad Hammes, Rodrigo Blaas, Christina Steinberg, Dan Hageman, Kevin Hageman, Lawrence Jonas	Nominated
2018	Daytime Emmy Awards	Outstanding Writing in an Animated Program	Dan Hageman, Kevin Hageman, Aaron Waltke, Chad Quandt, AC Bradley	Won
2018	Daytime Emmy Awards	Outstanding Sound Editing - Animation	Matt Hall, Goeun Lee, James Miller, James Oliver, Aran Tanchum, Stacey Michaels, Vincent Guilsetti, Alex Ulrich	Nominated
2018	Daytime Emmy Awards	Outstanding Main Title and Graphic Design	Rodrigo Blaas, Andy Erekson, Jonathan Catalan, Dai Weier, David M.V. Jones, John Laus, Title Sequence storyboarded by Michael Smukavic	Nominated
2018	British Academy Children's Awards	International Animation	Rodrigo Blaas, Marc Guggenheim, Chad Hammes	Nominated
2019	Annie Awards	Best Animated Television/Broadcast Production For Children	"Trollhunters: Tales of Arcadia"	Nominated
2019	Annie Awards	Animated Effects in an Animated Production	"Trollhunters: Tales of Arcadia"	Won
2019	Daytime Emmy Awards	Outstanding Writing for an Animated Program	Marc Guggenheim, Dan Hageman, Kevin Hageman, AC Bradley, Chad Quandt, Lila Scott and Aaron Waltke	Nominated
2019	Daytime Emmy Awards	Outstanding Directing for an Animated Program	Rodrigo Blaas, Elaine Bogan, Guillermo del Toro, Johane Matte, Andrew Schmidt	Nominated
2019	Daytime Emmy Awards	Outstanding Sound Mixing For An Animated Program	Carlos Sanches	Nominated
2019	Daytime Emmy Awards	Outstanding Sound Editing For An Animated Program	Matt Hall, Otis Van Osten, Jason Oliver, Aran Tanchum, Vincent Guisetti	Nominated

== Tales of Arcadia ==
On November 6, 2017, show creator Guillermo del Toro announced that Trollhunters would be expanded into a trilogy of animated series known as Tales of Arcadia. The trilogy was continued by a sci-fi animated series known as 3Below: Tales of Arcadia, which centers on two royal aliens and their bodyguard who escape from their home planet and crash-land on Earth in Arcadia, where Trollhunters also takes place. There, the aliens adjust to human culture and try to fix their spaceship to return and take back their home planet, which is being taken over by an evil dictator. 3Below premiered on Netflix in 2018. The trilogy then was concluded with the animated series Wizards: Tales of Arcadia, in which wizard-in-training named Douxie Casperan must embark on a time-bending adventure to medieval Camelot in a battle with the Arcane Order. The limited series premiered on Netflix on August 7, 2020. Tales of Arcadia ended with a full-length feature film entitled Trollhunters: Rise of the Titans, which brings together the three disparate worlds of trolls, aliens and wizards who have found themselves drawn to Arcadia, "...culminating in an apocalyptic battle for the control of magic that will ultimately determine the fate of these supernatural worlds that have now converged". The film was announced on August 7, 2020, and was released globally on Netflix on Wednesday, July 21, 2021.
