= Chad Quandt =

American screenwriter and television producer

- Born: September 30, 1987 (age 38); Indiana, U.S.
- Occupations: Screenwriter, showrunner and television producer
- Notable work: Trollhunters; Wizards: Tales of Arcadia; Star Trek: Prodigy; Unikitty!

Chad Quandt (born September 30, 1987) is an American TV writer, producer, and showrunner. He is best known for his work on Star Trek: Prodigy and Trollhunters: Tales of Arcadia; he was also co-executive producer and co-showrunner of Wizards: Tales of Arcadia. He received an Emmy Award for Trollhunters: Tales of Arcadia and a Peabody Award for Star Trek: Prodigy.

== Early life ==
Quandt was raised in South Bend, Indiana, and attended Indiana University, graduating cum laude with honors in telecommunications. He pursued writing as a hobby in high school and college, but hadn't thought of it as a career until he took screenwriting classes at Indiana University and began performing stand-up comedy and writing for the college newspaper The Indiana Daily Student. He also hosted The Friday Zone, a children's educational series, produced by PBS affiliate WITU.

== Career ==
=== Film and television ===
In 2012, Quandt was attached to a live-action/CGI remake of The Brave Little Toaster from Waterman Entertainment, but it was not produced.

In 2016, Quandt sold The Remember Hour, a comedic post-apocalyptic series framed as a puppet show, to Disney-owned Maker Studios as a web series for the channel Polaris. He also hosted numerous programs for the channel including The Daily Byte, Chad Chomp, REMAG, The Friend Zone, and The Holodeck.

He joined the writing staff of Guillermo del Toro’s animated supernatural fantasy series Trollhunters: Tales of Arcadia the same year. He is credited in 24 episodes, and he was nominated for an Annie Award,Outstanding Achievement for Writing in an Animated Television/Broadcast Production in 2018 for the episode "Escape from the Darklands"; the episode also won a Kidscreen Award for Best Writing. He also won the Daytime Emmy for Outstanding Writing for an Animated Program in 2018 and was nominated in 2019.

Quandt returned to Guillermo del Toro's Tales of Arcadia franchise as co-executive producer and co-showrunner for the follow-up series, Wizards: Tales of Arcadia, in 2020.

Quandt was a producer and staff writer for Star Trek: Prodigy. He wrote the episodes "Starstruck" and "Ghost in the Machine". The series was awarded a Peabody Award in 2024.

Quandt developed a pitch based on the Adult Swim short Learning With Pibby: Apocalypse, created by Dodge Greenley. On October 3, 2023, Greenley announced Adult Swim declined to pick up the series.

With Lauren Montgomery, Quandt developed an adaptation of The Search for WondLa, based on the novel of the same name by Tony DiTerlizzi, for Apple TV+, for which he is credited with Additional Writing Materials. As of 2025, he is story editor on Avatar: Seven Havens.

Since 2010, Quandt has hosted and produced the podcast Goosebuds, a comedy discussion about young adult books and media including Goosebumps and Animorphs.

=== Gaming ===
Quandt is one of the credited writers of the Dungeons & Dragons module Icewind Dale: Rime of the Frostmaiden, set in the Icewind Dale section of the Forgotten Realms, published in 2020.

=== Comics ===
Quandt wrote Cat Ninja Comics Issues #36 and #37 for Epic!, and created the independent comic Rite of Rumble, a wrestling series set in an alternative post-Y2K United States, with illustrator Kayla Cline.

== Selected filmography ==
Chad Quandt film and television work
Year	Title	Credit
2010–2015	Dick Figures	actor (4 episodes)
2012	Suck Tower	creator, writer, actor (1 episode)
2013	Dick Figures: The Movie	actor
2014–2018	Bee and PuppyCat	actor (1 episode)
2014	Continue?	actor (1 episode)
2015	Like, Share, Die	actor (1 episode)
2016-2017	The Remember Hour	Creator, producer, writer (16 episodes)
2016–2018	Trollhunters: Tales of Arcadia	Writer (52 episodes)
2016–2017	The Remember Hour	Creator (16 episodes)
2017	Teen Titans Go!	Writer (1 episode)
2018–2020	Unikitty!	Writer (56 episodes)
2020	Wizards: Tales of Arcadia	Co-Showrunner, Co-Executive Producer, Writer (10 episodes)
2021–2023	Star Trek: Prodigy	Producer, Writer (40 episodes)
2022–2023	WondLa	Additional Writing Materials
2026	Gameoverse	Additional Literary Materials
2026	Stranger Things: Tales From '85	Writer (2 episodes)
2026	Avatar: Seven Hevens	Story Editor

== †Awards and nominations ==
Year	Award	Category	Work	Result	Ref.
2018	Kidscreen Awards	Best Writing	Trollhunters: Tales of Arcadia	Won	
2018	Annie Awards	Outstanding Achievement for Writing in an Animated Television / Broadcast Production	Trollhunters: Tales of Arcadia	Nominated	
2018	Daytime Emmy Awards	Outstanding Writing in an Animated Program	Trollhunters: Tales of Arcadia	Won	
2019	Daytime Emmy Awards	Outstanding Writing for an Animated Program	Trollhunters: Tales of Arcadia	Nominated	
2021	Daytime Emmy Awards	Outstanding Children's Animated Series	Wizards: Tales of Arcadia	Nominated	
2021	Kidscreen Awards	Best New Series	Wizards: Tales of Arcadia	Won	
2022	Children's and Family Emmy Awards	Outstanding Animated Series	Star Trek: Prodigy	Nominated	
2023	Television Critics Association Awards	Outstanding Achievement in Family Programming	Star Trek: Prodigy	Nominated	
2024	Peabody Awards	Peabody Institutional Award	Star Trek, Star Trek: Prodigy	Won	
