= Waltke =

Waltke is a surname. Notable people with the surname include:

- Aaron Waltke (born 1984), American screenwriter and television producer
- Bruce Waltke (born 1930), American biblical scholar, theologian and academic
- Trey Waltke (born 1955), American tennis player
