= Wizards: Tales of Arcadia =

2020 animated television series

- Genre: Fantasy; Comedy-drama; Adventure
- Created by: Guillermo del Toro; Marc Guggenheim; Aaron Waltke; Chad Quandt
- Based on: Characters by Guillermo del Toro and Daniel Kraus
- Showrunners: Aaron Waltke; Guillermo del Toro; Marc Guggenheim; Chad Quandt
- Voices of: Colin O'Donoghue; David Bradley; Lexi Medrano; Steven Yeun; Kelsey Grammer; Lena Headey; Emile Hirsch; Stephanie Beatriz; James Faulkner
- Composers: Jeff Danna; John Fee
- Country of origin: United States
- Original language: English
- No. of episodes: 10

Production
- Executive producers: Guillermo del Toro; Marc Guggenheim; Aaron Waltke; Chad Quandt; Chad Hammes
- Running time: 23–24 minutes
- Production companies: Double Dare You Productions; DreamWorks Animation Television

Original release
- Network: Netflix
- Release: August 7, 2020

Related
- 3Below: Tales of Arcadia; Trollhunters: Rise of the Titans

Wizards: Tales of Arcadia (or simply Wizards) is an American animated fantasy television miniseries created by Guillermo del Toro, and produced by DreamWorks Animation Television and Double Dare You Productions. The award-winning series is the third and final installment of the Tales of Arcadia trilogy, following Trollhunters (2016–2018) and 3Below (2018–2019), and was released on August 7, 2020, on Netflix.

The first and only miniseries in the Tales of Arcadia franchise, it is a fantasy time travel saga that explores the world's mythological origins and introduces a new protagonist in Hisirdoux "Douxie" Casperan, a former apprentice to the legendary Merlin who was forgotten for centuries and is now eager to prove his worth as a sorcerer in the eyes of his old master.

Wizards has been acclaimed by critics as a groundbreaking animated series, both for its complex storytelling and high-quality animation. In 2021, the series was nominated for four Daytime Emmys, including Outstanding Children's Animated Series. It went on to win an Annie Award and the Kidscreen Award for "Best New Series," a category including all live-action and animated programming that year.

It was followed by a full-length feature film titled Trollhunters: Rise of the Titans, released on July 21, 2021.

== Synopsis ==
Following the events of Trollhunters and 3Below, Hisirdoux "Douxie" Casperan, who has secretly been the apprentice of Merlin for nine centuries, must recruit the Guardians of Arcadia to travel back in time to the 12th-century's Camelot. During the journey, the heroes learn why the amulet was built, how Morgana became the Pale Lady, and what events led up to the Battle of Killahead Bridge.

== Production ==
Wizards was announced as the third and final series in the Tales of Arcadia trilogy following the release of Trollhunters and 3Below. It was produced by Guillermo del Toro's Double Dare You alongside DreamWorks Animation for Netflix, with del Toro, Marc Guggenheim, Aaron Waltke, Chad Quandt, and Chad Hammes serving as executive producers. Waltke and Quandt served as head writers and co-showrunners. It was initially set to be released in 2019 but was postponed to August 7, 2020.

== Voice cast ==
The series features an ensemble cast of voice actors returning from Trollhunters and 3Below, alongside new voice actors.

- Colin O'Donoghue as Hisirdoux "Douxie" Casperan, Merlin's apprentice living in the 21st century in Arcadia working various jobs who is eager to become a Wizard and would end up joining the Trollhunters but accidentally sends Clarie, Jim, Steve, and himself to Arthur's reign.
  - O'Donoghue also voices Moppet, Douxie's past version who is more naive and has a manbun.
- David Bradley as Merlin Ambrosius, a centuries-old Wizard, creator of the Trollhunter Amulet and Douxie's master.
- Lexi Medrano as Claire Nuñez, a human witch and Jim's girlfriend who would become Morgana's apprentice before wielding her staff and is a member of the Trollhunters.
- Lena Headey as Morgana le Fay, a shadow witch and Arthur's sister who is sympathetic to magical beings and trolls.
- James Faulkner as King Arthur/the Green Knight, the king of Camelot who despises magic and trolls.
- Steven Yeun as Steve Palchuk, a school bully who joins the Trollhunters and would become a knight in Camelot.
- Alfred Molina as Archibald "Archie", a familiar and Douxie's best friend who can shapeshift into a black cat and a dragon.
- Emile Hirsch as Jim Lake Jr., the Trollhunter and Claire's boyfriend, who after being turned into a troll has a stone shard slowly impaling his heart.
- John Rhys-Davies as Sir Galahad, a knight in Camelot who is Merlin's old friend.
- Rupert Penry-Jones as Sir Lancelot, a knight in Camelot who resembles Steve and would train him as a knight.
- Kelsey Grammer as Blinkous "Blinky" Galadrigal, Jim's master in the future but a cowardly Troll Advisor during Arthur's reign.
- Mark Hamill as Dictatious Galadrigal, Blinky's brother who collects books and would join Gunmar in the future.
- Stephanie Beatriz as Callista the Calamity/Deya the Deliverer, a troll Jim meets when he is thrown into the dungeon who was kidnapped at birth and didn't know her original name; they would escape together and make it to the Trollbase.
  - Beatriz also voices Nimue/Lady of the Lake.
- Angel Lin as Nari of the Eternal Forest, a former member of the Arcane order who joined sides with Merlin.
- Clancy Brown as Gunmar the Black/Skullcrusher, the powerful leader of the Gumm-Gumms.
- Darin De Paul as Bular the Butcher, son of Gunmar. De Paul replaces Ron Perlman from Tales of Arcadia.
- Diego Luna as Krel Tarron, the prince of Akiridion-5 who stayed on Earth.
- Tom Kenny as Dadblank, Krel's Blankbot disguised as his human father.
  - Kenny also voices Lock, one part of Latch and Lock.
- Piotr Michael as Skrael, a member of the Arcane Order who controls ice.
  - Micheal also voices Bellroc's male voice.
- Charlie Saxton as Tobias "Toby" Domzalski, Jim's best friend and a member of the Trollhunters.
- Fred Tatasciore as AAARRRGGHH!!!, Toby's wingman and Blinky's friend who in the past was a Gumm-Gumm general until he was captured by the good trolls and wrangled by Blinky.
- Brian Blessed as Charlemagne the Devourer/Charlie, a powerful dragon and Archie's father.
- Victor Raider-Wexler as Vendel, the elder of Trollmarket who is distrustful towards humans.
- Rodrigo Blaas as Gnome Chompsky, a gnome Toby adopts as a pet.
- Kay Bess as Bellroc, a member of the Arcane Order who controls fire, Bess provides the female voice and Micheal the male.
- Brook Chalmers as Latch, one part of Latch and Lock.
- Kathleen Turner as the Lady of the Lake, who helped forge Excalibur. Turner previously voiced Gwendolyn from 3Below: Tales of Arcadia.
- Matthew Waterson as Draal, son of later-Trollhunter Kanjigar.
- Ike Amadi as Angor Rot, Morgana's champion.
- Sandra Saad as Zoe, a witch who knows Douxie and works at an electronics shop.
- Bebe Wood as Shannon, a girl who goes to Arcadia Oaks High.
- Tom Wilson as Coach Lawrence, the coach at Arcadia Oaks High.

== Episodes ==
No.	Title	Directed by	Written by	Original release date
1	"Spellbound"	Francisco Ruiz Velasco & Andrew L. Schmidt	Story by : Marc Guggenheim, Chad Quandt & Aaron Waltke; Teleplay by : Guillermo del Toro, Marc Guggenheim, Chad Quandt & Aaron Waltke	August 7, 2020
In the late 12th century, Merlin catches his apprentice Hisirdoux "Douxie" Casperan in the act of using magic to finish his chores. Douxie wants to be "a real wizard-like [Merlin], with a staff and everything", but Merlin tells him it takes time to master the magic needed to have one. In present-day Arcadia Oaks, Douxie and his familiar, Archie, are contacted by Merlin after centuries of waiting. Something dire is afoot, and Douxie is instructed to gather the heroes of Arcadia. However, Archie can only find Tobias Domzalski, Steve Palchuk, and AAARRRGGHH!!! the troll and takes them to their secret lair hidden in a bookshop. There, they and Merlin are attacked by monstrous shadow mephits and a strange figure in green medieval armor before retreating on an airship that Merlin conjures from a snow globe. The teens reunite with Claire Nuñez and Blinky in Camelot Castle – now a flying air fortress powered by the mysterious Heart of Avalon – where they learn that Jim Lake Jr. the Trollhunter was attacked with an onyx shard conjured by the mysterious Green Knight, who Merlin discovers is somehow connected to his fallen apprentice and archenemy, Morgana le Fay. The onyx shard that wounded Jim is slowly killing him, so Merlin encased him in green crystal to stall its progress. Suddenly, the Arcane Order – an evil organization of demigods consisting of Bellroc and Skrael and brought by the Green Knight – attacks Camelot, killing Sir Galahad and forcing Merlin and his wizard companion Nari to open a rift in time. However, during the attack, Claire, Steve, Douxie, and Jim all fall into the past and awaken in Camelot's forest, where they are confronted by Sir Lancelot and his men.
2	"History in the Making"	Johane Matte	Guillermo del Toro, Marc Guggenheim, Chad Quandt & Aaron Waltke	August 7, 2020
Upon their crash-landing in the mid-12th century, Jim is freed from the crystal and finds himself alive, despite the onyx shard from the Green Knight's spell still wedged in his chest. However, because he is half-troll and gets petrified in daylight like one, the Knights capture him, Claire, Douxie, and Steve and take them to King Arthur and his court, which includes his sister Morgana, infuriating Claire because she had tried to possess her body one year ago. However, Douxie and Morgana convince Arthur to spare Jim's life, even though he ends up trapped in a dungeon with other trolls, while Morgana adopts Claire as her new handmaiden (secretly interested in the dark magic that Claire used to save Jim) and Steve trains to be a knight under the command of Lancelot. Meanwhile, Douxie returns to his old living space and seeks Past Merlin's help in accessing the time map to return them home to Arcadia Oaks without further altering the timeline.
3	"Witch Hunt"	Andrew L. Schmidt	Andie Bolt, Ian Rickett, & Lila Scott	August 7, 2020
Having staged a dungeon break, Douxie and Claire work covertly to get Arthur and Morgana le Fay to reconcile, but with Past Merlin and Archie getting involved, Douxie is getting on his master's nerve. Meanwhile, Jim and the other trolls freed from the dungeon are now living in the Wild Woods, protected by a younger Gunmar and his son Bular. However, despite the group's efforts, Jim's new friend Callista gets hurt, Bular is captured by the knights, and Morgana, enraged by Arthur's stubbornness, turns against the rest of Camelot's people when they try to kill Jim and Claire in front of her. But, as they battle, Arthur cuts off Morgana's left hand with Excalibur and watches as she falls to her death off a cliff and disappears into the waters below. In the end tag, Arthur and Claire grieve Morgana's demise and Jim (seemingly on the brink of death) crosses paths with a younger version of his troll mentor Blinkous "Blinky" Galadrigal.
4	"Lady of the Lake"	Francisco Ruiz Velasco	Andie Bolt, Ian Rickett, & Lila Scott	August 7, 2020
Merlin leads a ragtag group on a mission to collect and reconnect the broken pieces of Excalibur. Meanwhile, Claire's been having nightmares about Morgana and Jim as her dark magic seems to be getting stronger, and Jim tries to convince a young Blinkous Galadrigal that they're on the same side only for an evil AAARRRGGHH!!! to attack the troll sanctuary of Dwoza. Eventually, after teaching Claire to control her shadow magic without Morgana's staff, Douxie's group encounters Nimue, the Lady of the Lake, who reveals herself to be a vicious kraken. She tells the teens that Merlin trapped her in the cave long after she gave him Excalibur and she attacked them in an attempt to get her revenge. After breaking down the cave wall with one of his spells, Douxie earns Nimue's trust and she repairs Excalibur. In the end tag, Angor Rot discovers Morgana's body and brings her to the cave of the Arcane Order, who revive her and give her a new left hand to replace her severed one.
5	"Battle Royale"	Johane Matte	Andie Bolt, Ian Rickett, & Lila Scott	August 7, 2020
Having been revived by the Arcane Order (consisting of a younger Nari, Skrael, and Bellroc), Morgana gains new powers and golden battle armor and is dubbed the Mother of Monsters, vowing to bring in an Age of Reckoning by fighting for all magics. Meanwhile, Douxie continues training Claire when she overhears Morgana plotting in the Shadow Realm and accidentally contacts her. Having barely escaped with their lives, Archie and Claire must form a counterattack for when Morgana returns to Camelot. Meanwhile, Jim and Callista try to defend Dwoza from Gunmar and his general AAARRRGGHH!!!, who are angry about Bular being held prisoner in Camelot. Jim's actions inspire both Blinkous and his brother Dictatious to lead a revolt to drive back Gunmar's presence in their village and Callista successfully captures AAARRRGGHH!!!. Jim suggests they rehabilitate AAARRRGGHH!!! and Vendel, the future leader of Trollmarket, puts the fallen general under the watchful care of Blinky. Back in Camelot, Claire dons her armor and poses as a knight named Sir "Clairee", as she exposes a changeling sent by Morgana to free Bular and assassinate Arthur. Douxie and his group come to Arthur's rescue, despite a bombing of the castle walls allowing Bular to escape, and they capture the changeling spy. In the end tag, Morgana approaches Gunmar and proposes an alliance.
6–7	"Killahead"	Francisco Ruiz Velasco	Andie Bolt, Ian Rickett, & Lila Scott (Part 1) Chad Quandt & Aaron Waltke (Part 2)	August 7, 2020
To defend what's left of Camelot, King Arthur seeks an alliance with the good trolls living in Dwoza, and Claire tries to reunite with Jim. Meanwhile, AAARRRGGHH!!! and Blinky's friendship begins, Morgana enchants Gunmar's Decimaar Blade to control minds, and Douxie and Merlin finish building the Trollhunter's amulet, with Merlin promoting Douxie to the rank of Master Wizard with his own staff. Then, the amulet chooses Callista to be its first wearer. The trolls reject Callista at first and they refuse to join in the battle. However, the battle for Killahead Bridge begins regardless. In the end tag scene, Callista reads a rock with troll writing, translated "Deya." Accepting her new role, she renames herself Deya the Deliverer and sets the stage for the original Trollhunters timeline. Despite the heroes' best efforts, Sir Lancelot and King Arthur are killed by Bular and Bellroc in the battle for Killahead Bridge after the Arcane Order decide to make themselves known and partake in the mass carnage. Just as all seems lost for the humans, Deya leads the trolls into battle to aid the humans. When Deya and Gunmar are at the bridge, she places the amulet on the side of the large construct, which opens the portal into the Darklands that sucks Gunmar and the Gumm-Gumms in. At the same time, Claire, Douxie, and Merlin succeed in defeating Morgana, with Claire foreshadowing their next and last encounter in the future and sending her across the world to where she is imprisoned in the realm of Trollhunters.
8	"Wizard Underground"	Johane Matte	Andie Bolt, Ian Rickett, & Lila Scott	August 7, 2020
After returning home to Arcadia in the 21st century, and destroying the high school with Camelot's crash-landing, the team reunites with the present-day Merlin, Toby, Blinky, and AAARRRGGHH, and learns how Nari defected from the Arcane Order and sought protective asylum. However, the Arcane Order attacks and the Green Knight pushes the onyx shard closer to Jim's chest. Jim sacrifices himself by pushing the shard completely into his chest, turning into a full troll and allowing him to fight back before he weakens. However, he becomes enslaved by the Green Knight, forcing the team to regroup at their final hiding place, Hex Tech, where they reunite with Krel Tarron and discuss their next move. Meanwhile, the Order takes the Amulet of Daylight and destroys it in a ritual to raise Morgana from the Shadow Realm and re-induct her into their ranks. The Trollhunters come up with a plan where they magically disguise Archie as Nari as part of a trade at the Arcane Order's flying castle while hiding the real Nari at Hex Tech, only for it to backfire and cause a confrontation. During the battle, the Green Knight reveals himself to be a resurrected Arthur, now under Bellroc and Skrael's spell. In the end tag, Arthur fatally wounds Merlin, who leaves behind a mysterious book for Claire and Douxie to safeguard before dying.
9	"Dragon's Den"	Andrew L. Schmidt	Chad Quandt, Aaron Waltke, Ian Rickett, & Lila Scott	August 7, 2020
In a flashback, Merlin adopts Douxie and Archie by saving them from persecution in the streets of Camelot by Sir Galahad. In the present, Archie and Douxie, along with Claire and Steve, mourn Merlin's death. To stop the Arcane Order, Archie and Douxie visit Archie's father, a large dragon named Charlemagne the Devourer, aka 'Charlie', to help translate Merlin's Grimoire in order to determine the location of the Genesis Seals. While Krel, Steve, and Toby keep watch over Nari, Claire enters the Shadow Realm to find Jim's soul. Meanwhile, Morgana realizes that her interests are no longer aligned with the Arcane Order, and she must try to repair her relationship with Arthur; she leaves for the Shadow Realm to find her brother's soul and free him from Bellroc and Skrael's influence. Morgana and Claire help each other in the Shadow Realm, but neither is successful in saving Arthur or Jim's souls; Jim is being torn apart, and Arthur reveals he had Morgana brought back from the dead so she can see him and the Order kill Merlin. This drives Morgana to side with the Trollhunters and wizards of Arcadia. At the end tag, the Order follows Morgana to Hex Tech.
10	"Our Final Act"	Andrew L. Schmidt	Chad Quandt, Aaron Waltke, Ian Rickett, & Lila Scott	August 7, 2020
Returning to Arcadia, Douxie tries to protect Nari from the Arcane Order and retrieves Krel from the wreckage of a fight at Hex Tech. The other heroes are bound by Bellroc and Skrael aboard the Arcane Order's flying castle. Douxie delays the Order using a time loop built from the remains of the Heart of Avalon so he can rescue the others from the ship. He frees Nari from the Order after Morgana sends herself and Arthur flying out a window. Morgana and Arthur battle each other on the ground, while Claire, Toby, Blinky, and AAARRRGGHH!!! desperately try to save Jim. As Morgana neutralizes Arthur's ability to wield Excalibur and sacrifices herself to squish her brother, Jim is freed from the spell but turns to stone and dies. As Claire hugs Jim's stone form and cries, a tear falls off her cheek, landing on stone Jim and causing him to crumble. From the rubble rises Jim in his original human form, but he no longer has the Amulet of Daylight or the powers of a Trollhunter. With Arthur's demise, Excalibur is stuck in a stone. Meanwhile, Douxie is gravely injured in his battle with the Arcane Order, who escaped the time loop. The spirits of Douxie, Morgana, and Merlin have a final conversation in Merlin's old library/workshop before Morgana and Merlin walk through a door to the afterlife and Douxie's soul is returned to his body. Douxie vows to spend the rest of his life protecting Nari from the Arcane Order to prevent the breaking of the Genesis Seals. Jim and Toby both try to remove Excalibur from the stone, but to no avail. Douxie, Archie, and Nari leave on Merlin's airship while Jim, Claire, Toby, Steve, Blinky, AAARRRGGHH!!!, and Krel remain behind as the champions tasked with protecting Arcadia from future threats, but Douxie promises to return in the near future. The series ends a short while later, with Nari and Douxie walking on a street in a city while Bellroc watches them from atop a building, plotting their revenge.

== Reception ==
=== Critical response ===
The series has a 100% approval rating on Rotten Tomatoes. According to Guillermo del Toro, Wizards: Tales of Arcadia was in the Top Ten most streamed series worldwide on Netflix during the week it premiered, drawing more viewers than all other live-action and animated content at that time. As reported by Screen Rant, Wizards was rated the best new Netflix Original Kids' Series released in 2020, according to IMDb.

Drew Taylor of Collider writes, "Everything about the world is fully realized with incredible detail... it really looks exceptional, and as the culmination of the franchise so far, it is hard to top." In his Decider review, John Serba of The New York Post writes the show excels in "...classical myths reimagined with modern sensibilities, with vivid animation, crisp comedy and a muscular, but not too heavy, sense of drama. Del Toro's hand guides the series into creative avenues without ever being off the rails."

Alci Rengifo of Entertainment Voice gave the series a positive review. "Del Toro wants everyone, even the adults, to get something out of Wizards. This makes it an adventure worth taking, like any great fairy tale."

Rafael Motamayor of The Observer applauded the series for its bold deconstruction of Arthurian myth, which it uses to explore difficult themes like prejudice, ideological war, and racism. In his essay, he compares the series to del Toro's films such as The Shape of Water, with Douxie and the other heroes observing firsthand how history can be rewritten into false legends at the expense of the oppressed magical creatures Arthur and his knights seek to slay.

=== Accolades ===
In 2021, Wizards won the Kidscreen Award for "Best New Series," a category including all live-action and animated programming that year. It was nominated for four Emmys, including Outstanding Children's Animated Series, and won "Outstanding Main Title for a Daytime Animated Program." It was also nominated for a Golden Reel Award for Outstanding Achievement in Sound Editing, and has received an Annie Award in the category of Best Voice Acting and a nomination in Best FX.

Year	Award	Category	Nominee(s)	Result
2021	Kidscreen Awards	Best New Series	Guillermo del Toro, Marc Guggenheim, Aaron Waltke, Chad Quandt, Chad Hammes. "Wizards: Tales of Arcadia"	Won
2021	Golden Reel Awards	Outstanding Achievement in Sound Editing – Animation Short Form	Supervising Sound Editors: James Miller, Otis Van Osten Foley Editor: Tommy Sarioglou, Aran Tanchum Dialogue Editors: Carlos Sanches, Jason Oliver Foley Artist: Vincent Guisetti, "Spellbound"	Nominated
2021	Annie Awards	Best Voice Acting, TV/Media	David Bradley for the character of Merlin. "Wizards: Tales of Arcadia", Episode: "Our Final Act"	Won
2021	Annie Awards	Best FX for TV/Media	Greg Lev, Igor Lodeiro, Brandon Tyra, Cui Wei, Ma Xiao. Episode: "Killahead, Part Two"	Nominated
2021	Daytime Emmy Awards	Outstanding Children's Animated Series	Guillermo del Toro, Marc Guggenheim, Aaron Waltke, Chad Hammes, Chad Quandt, Lauren Prince	Nominated
2021	Daytime Emmy Awards	Outstanding Main Title for an Animated Program	Francisco Ruiz Velasco, Alfonso Blaas, Yingjue Linda Chen, Brandon Tyra, Greg Lev, Igor Lodeiro, Jonatan Catalan Navarrete	Won
2021	Daytime Emmy Awards	Outstanding Editing for an Animated Program	John Laus, Jay Fox, Andrew Ramstedt, Joel Fischer	Nominated
2021	Daytime Emmy Awards	Outstanding Sound Mixing and Sound Editing for an Animated Program	Otis Van Osten, Carlos Sanches, James Miller, Jason Oliver, Vincent Guisetti, Aran Tanchum	Nominated
2021	Lightbox Expo Concept Art Awards	Best Character Design in an Animated Series	Alfonso Blaas, Production Designer	Won

== Follow-up ==
On August 7, 2020, following the premiere of Wizards, it was announced the Tales of Arcadia trilogy would be concluded with a full-length feature film titled Trollhunters: Rise of the Titans, set to be released on Netflix on July 21, 2021.
