= Playback (magazine) =

Canadian film, TV and new media trade publication

Playback's logo

Playback is an online Canadian film, broadcasting, and interactive media trade magazine owned by Brunico Communications. It was previously published biweekly as a print magazine for the Canadian entertainment industry.

== History ==
The first issue of Playback magazine was published, in tabloid format, on 29 September 1986.

The magazine has since begun to report on advancements in the online digital media industry as well, specifically web series and related events, media, and culture. The magazine also reports on funding resources for filmmakers, technical advancements in the industry, and trends. It is widely considered to be a "must read" amongst industry professionals.

In May 2010, Playback magazine stopped publishing its biweekly print edition and became an exclusively online magazine.
