= Marc Guggenheim =

American screenwriter, television producer, comic book writer, and novelist

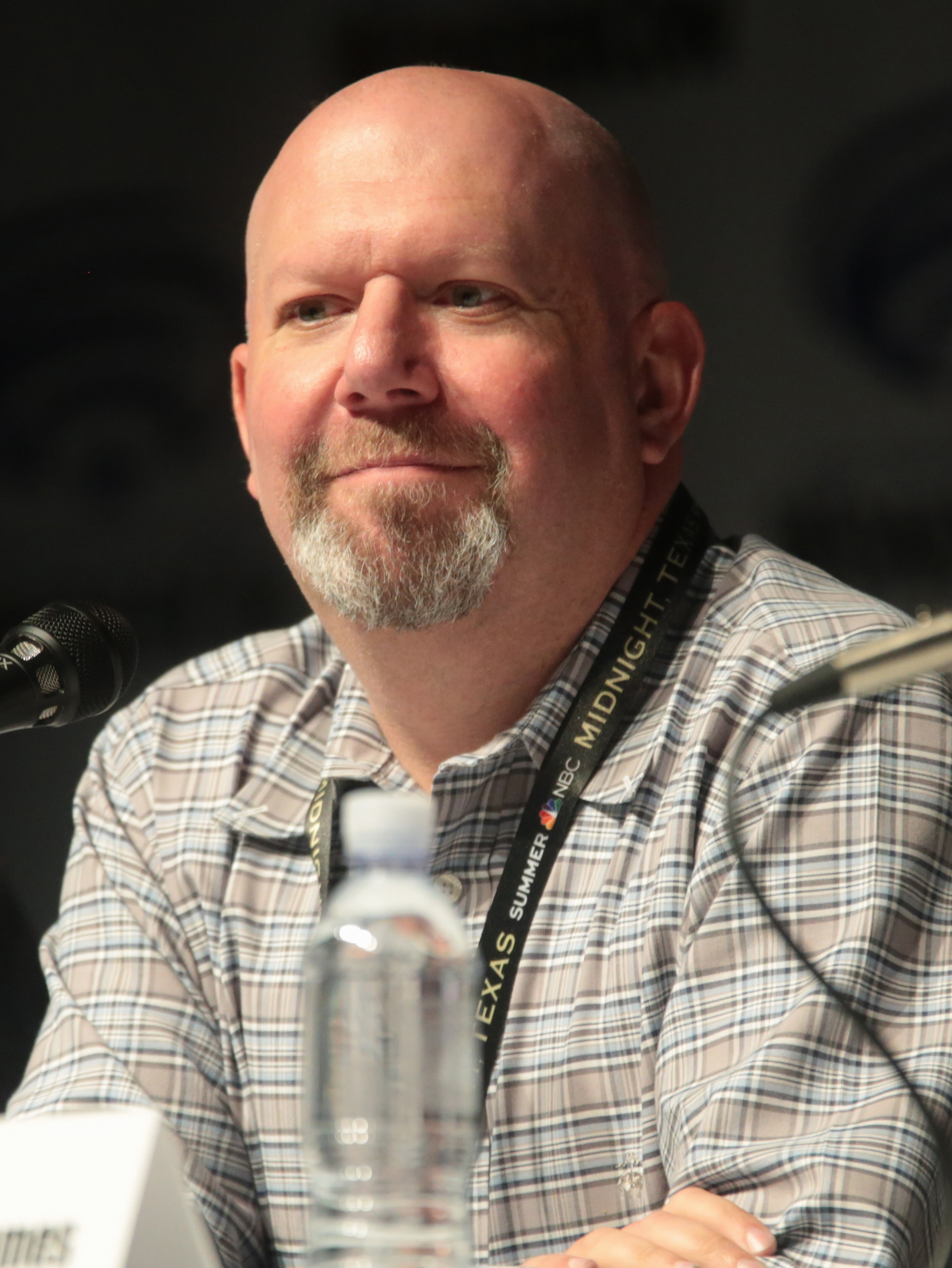
- Guggenheim at the 2017 WonderCon.
- Born: September 24, 1970 (age 56); Long Island, New York, U.S.
- Occupations: Television producer and comic book writer
- Notable work: Arrow; Legends of Tomorrow; Eli Stone; Green Lantern
- Spouse: Tara Butters
- Family: Eric Guggenheim; David Guggenheim

Marc Guggenheim (born September 24, 1970) is an American screenwriter, television producer, comic book writer, and novelist. He is best known as the creator of the television series Eli Stone (2008–2009), Arrow (2012–2020), and Legends of Tomorrow (2016–2022), executive producer of the animated series Tales of Arcadia (2016–2021), as well as the writer of the feature films Green Lantern (2011) and Percy Jackson: Sea of Monsters (2013).

== Early life ==
Marc Guggenheim was born and raised to a Jewish family on Long Island, New York. He attended the University at Albany, State University of New York. His brothers are screenwriters Eric Guggenheim and David Guggenheim.

== Career ==
Guggenheim worked in Boston, Massachusetts as a lawyer at Hutchins Wheeler & Dittmar, and part-time writer for five years.

=== Television ===
After a romantic comedy script led to a few meetings with producers, he moved to California to pursue a career as a screenwriter. A script for The Practice was his first produced work. He eventually served as a producer for Law & Order, Jack & Bobby, CSI: Miami, and In Justice.

With Greg Berlanti, Guggenheim is the co-creator of the ABC show Eli Stone. He later became executive producer of ABC's No Ordinary Family. Guggenheim, together with Berlanti and Andrew Kreisberg, adapted the Green Arrow comics into the television series Arrow, which spun off several TV shows based on DC Comics characters. Guggenheim developed one of these spinoff shows, Legends of Tomorrow, along with Berlanti, Kriesberg and Phil Klemmer. Guggenheim served as co-showrunner on Arrow for seasons 1-6 and 8, and on Legends of Tomorrow for seasons 1–4. In the fall of 2018, he stepped down as showrunner and serve as an executive consultant to both shows. He remained in this role until the shows ended. Including The Flash and Supergirl, Guggenheim is credited for writing on 63 episodes in the Arrowverse, the most of any writer.

With Guillermo del Toro, he co-wrote the pilot and several episodes of the award-winning animated series Tales of Arcadia, an original franchise created for Netflix from DreamWorks Animation, for which he won an Emmy in the category of "Outstanding Writing in an Animated Program" and nominated for several others. He remained as Executive Producer throughout the series' three installments, Trollhunters, 3Below and Wizards: Tales of Arcadia.

In October 2020, it was announced that Guggenheim would be writing a series based on Green Lantern alongside Seth Grahame-Smith, who is showrunning the series, for HBO Max in 2021. However, in October 2022, when Grahame-Smith departed from the series Guggenheim confirmed he would also no longer be involved.

=== Comic books ===
He served as an intern at Marvel for a time in 1990 for editor Terry Kavanagh, and was the colorist for an eight-page Iceman/Human Torch story while there. His writing experiences also include the comic books Aquaman for DC Comics, Wolverine and The Punisher for Marvel, and Perfect Dark Zero for Rare Game. He wrote Blade for twelve issues with artist Howard Chaykin.

In 2006, Guggenheim took over the writing of The Flash. Guggenheim's run concluded with the death of the fourth Flash, Bart Allen.

In 2007, Guggenheim became one of the rotating team of writers on The Amazing Spider-Man. His first story appeared in Amazing Spider-Man #549. He also launched a creator-owned comic, Resurrection, for Oni Press.

He wrote the comic book Young X-Men for Marvel which was launched in April 2008, and in 2008 was working on a comic with Hugh Jackman and Virgin Comics, Nowhere Man, and on Super Zombies for Dynamite Entertainment and Stephen King.

He wrote the script for the 2009 video game X-Men Origins: Wolverine, developed by Raven Software, a video game based on the film of the same name.

Guggenheim was intended to take over Action Comics after the War of the Supermen limited series, but was replaced by Paul Cornell. Guggenheim instead worked on Justice Society of America.

== Personal life ==
Guggenheim is married to fellow writer-producer and showrunner Tara Butters, who has previously worked on projects including Marvel's Agent Carter, ABC's Resurrection and Dollhouse.

During the 2023 writers strike Guggenheim sided with the WGA and went on strike.

== Filmography ==
Marc Guggenheim television work
| Year | Title | Credited as | | | Notes |
| Year | Title | Writer | Producer | Executive producer | Notes |
|---|---|---|---|---|---|
| 2001 | The Practice | Yes | | | Writer (1 episode), staff writer |
| 2003 | Dragnet | Yes | | | Writer (1 episode) |
| 2001–2004 | Law & Order | Yes | Yes | | Writer (8 episodes), executive story editor; co-producer, producer |
| 2004–2005 | Jack & Bobby | Yes | Yes | | Writer (4 episodes); supervising producer |
| 2005 | CSI: Miami | Yes | | | Writer (3 episodes); supervising producer |
| 2006 | In Justice | Yes | | | Writer (1 episode); supervising producer |
| 2006–2007 | Brothers & Sisters | Yes | | | Writer (2 episodes); consulting producer |
| 2008–2009 | Eli Stone | Yes | | Yes | Co-creator; writer (5 episodes) |
| 2009–2010 | FlashForward | Yes | | Yes | Writer (4 episodes) |
| 2010–2011 | No Ordinary Family | Yes | Yes | | Writer (3 episodes); consulting producer |
| 2012–2020 | Arrow | Yes | Yes | Yes | Co-developer; writer (28 episodes); consulting producer (30 episodes) |
| 2015–2016 | Vixen | Yes | | Yes | Co-developer; writer (1 episode) |
| 2016–2020 | Legends of Tomorrow | Yes | Yes | Yes | Co-developer; writer; consulting producer |
| 2016–2018 | Trollhunters: Tales of Arcadia | Yes | | Yes | Executive producer; writer |
| 2018–2019 | 3Below: Tales of Arcadia | Yes | | Yes | Executive producer; writer (2 episodes) |
| 2019 | Carnival Row | Yes | | Yes | Executive producer; writer (1 episode) |
| 2019 | Supergirl | Yes | | Yes | Executive producer; writer |
| 2020 | Wizards: Tales of Arcadia | Yes | | Yes | Executive producer; writer (2 episodes) |

Marc Guggenheim film work
| Year | Title | Credit | Notes |
|---|---|---|---|
| 2011 | Green Lantern | Screen story by, screenplay by | With Greg Berlanti & Michael Green and Michael Goldberg |
| 2013 | Percy Jackson: Sea of Monsters | Screenplay by | "Based on" the novel by Rick Riordan |
| 2021 | Trollhunters: Rise of the Titans | Written by | With Guillermo del Toro and The Hageman Brothers "Based on" Tales of Arcadia by del Toro & Daniel Kraus |

Marc Guggenheim video game work
| Year | Title | Credit | Notes |
|---|---|---|---|
| 2005 | Perfect Dark Zero | Writer | With Dale Murchie |
| 2006 | Call of Duty 3 | Writer | With Richard Farrelly and Adam Gascoine |
| 2009 | Join the Mosaic | Writer | |
| 2009 | X-Men Origins: Wolverine | Writer | Based on the film directed by Gavin Hood |
| 2010 | Singularity | Written by | With Lindsey Allen and Emily Silver |

== Bibliography ==
=== Novels ===
- Overwatch (2014)
- Arrow: Fatal Legacies (2018) co-authored with James R. Tuck
- In Any Lifetime: A Novel (2024)

=== Comics ===
==== DC Comics ====
- Batman Confidential #50–54 (2011)
- Green Lantern:
  - Green Lantern: The Movie Prequels (tpb, 128 pages, 2011, ISBN 1-4012-3313-9) includes:
    - Green Lantern Movie Prequel: Tomar-Re (one-shot, 2011)
  - Green Lantern #13-14 (2024)
- Arrow Special Edition #1 (2012)
- Arrow #1–12 (2012–2013)
- Adventures of Superman vol. 2 #8 (2013)
- Legends of the Dark Knight 100-Page Super Spectacular #4 (2014)
- Arrow: Season 2.5 #1–12 (2014–2015)
- The Flash:
  - Flash: Season Zero #5 (plot) (2015)
  - The Flash: The Fastest Man Alive #9-13 (2007)
- Love is Love OGN (Batman) (2016)
- Crisis on Infinite Earths Giant #1–2 (with Marv Wolfman) (2019–2020)
- Titans Giant #1 (2020)
- Batman: Gotham Nights #11, 18, 20 (digital) (2020)
- Aquaman #30-31 (2005)
- Justice League: Dark Tomorrow Special (2025)
- Justice Society of America #44-54 (2010–2011)

==== Dynamite Entertainment ====
- Galactica 1980 #1—4 (September 2009 – January 2010)
- Nowhere Man #1—4 (2012)

==== Marvel Comics ====
- Punisher: The Trial of the Punisher #1–2 (2013)
- Daredevil vol. 4 #15.1 (2015)
- All-New, All-Different Marvel Point One #1 (S.H.I.E.L.D.) (2015)
- Squadron Supreme:
  - Squadron Sinister #1–4 (2015)
    - collected in: Squadron Sinister (tpb, 141 pages, 2015)
  - Squadron Supreme: Hyperion vs. Nighthawk #1-4
- The Accused #1 (2016)
- Agents of S.H.I.E.L.D. #1–10 (2016)
- X-Men:
  - X-Men vol 4 #18–22 (2014)
    - collected in: X-Men Volume 4: Exogenous (tpb, 112 pages, 2015)
  - X-Tinction Agenda #1–4 (2015)
    - collected in X-Tinction Agenda: Warzones! (tpb, 112 pages, 2016)
  - X-Men Prime #1 (2017)
  - X-Men Gold #1–36, Annual #1 (2017–2018)
  - X-Men: Days of Future Past – Doomsday #1-4 (2023)
  - X-Men: The Wedding Special (2018)
  - Young X-Men #1-12 (2008–2009)
- Star Wars:
  - Star Wars: Age of Rebellion Special #1 (2019)
  - Star Wars: Age of Republic Special #1 (2019)
  - Star Wars: Dark Droids – D-Squad #1-4 (2023)
  - Star Wars: Han Solo & Chewbacca #1-10 (2022–2023)
  - Star Wars: Return of the Jedi – Jabba's Palace (2023)
  - Star Wars: Yoda #7-9 (2023)
  - Star Wars: Jedi Knights (2025–present)
- Beware the Planet of the Apes (2024)
- Spider-Man:
  - The Amazing Spider-Man Presents: Jackpot #1-3 (2010)
  - The Amazing Spider-Man: EXTRA! #1, 3 (2008–2009)
  - The Amazing Spider-Man #546-555, 557–582, 584–600, 602–606, 608–610, 647, Annual #35-36
- Blade #1-12 (2006–2007)
- Bring on the Bad Guys: Doom (2025)
- Bring on the Bad Guys: Abomination (2025)
- Bring on the Bad Guys: Dormammu (2025)
- Bring on the Bad Guys: Green Goblin (2025)
- Bring on the Bad Guys: Loki (2025)
- Bring on the Bad Guys: Mephisto (2025)
- Bring on the Bad Guys: Red Skull (2025)
- Civil War II: The Accused (2016)
- Civil War: Choosing Sides (2006)
- Deadpool: Seven Slaughters (2023)
- Iron Man vs. Whiplash #1-4 (2009–2010)
- Marvel Comics #1001 (2019)
- Moon Knight: Black, White & Blood #1 (2022)
- Wolverine #42-48, 57–61

==== Oni Press ====
- Stringers #1–5 (2015)
  - collected in: Stringers Volume 1 (tpb, 141 pages, 2016)

==== Legendary Comics ====
- The Infinite Adventures of Jonas Quantum #1–6 (2015–2016)

==== Image ====
- Torrent #1 – (2023)

| Preceded by Stuart Moore | Wolverine writer 2006 | Succeeded by Rob Williams |
| Preceded by Jason Aaron | Wolverine writer 2007–2008 | Succeeded by Jason Aaron |
| Preceded by Bill Willingham; Lilah Sturges | Justice Society of America writer 2010-2011 | Succeeded by Geoff Johns |
