= Aaron Waltke =

American screenwriter and television producer

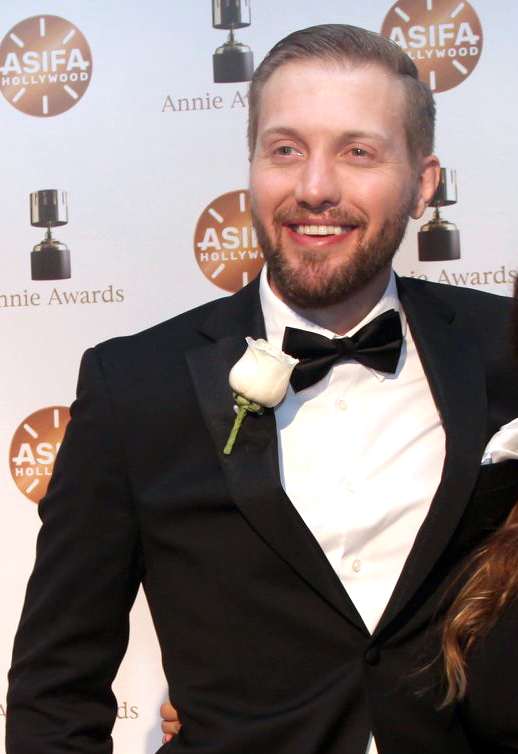
- Waltke at the 2018 Annie Awards
- Born: August 8, 1984 (age 42); Indianapolis, Indiana, United States
- Other name: Aaron J. Waltke
- Occupations: screenwriter and television producer
- Notable work: Trollhunters; Wizards: Tales of Arcadia; Star Trek: Prodigy; Unikitty!
- Spouse: Ellen Tremiti (m. 2016)

Aaron John Waltke (born August 8, 1984) is an American screenwriter, author, executive producer and showrunner. He is best known for his work on Guillermo del Toro's Trollhunters (2016–2018), Wizards: Tales of Arcadia (2020), and Star Trek: Prodigy (2021–2024). He has received a Daytime Emmy Award, a Peabody Award, and multiple nominations for his work in film and television. In 2020, he was named by The College Magazine as one of its "20 under 40" List.

== Early life ==
Aaron Waltke was born and raised in Greenwood, Indiana and spent some of his childhood on the islands of Sanibel-Captiva in the Gulf of Mexico. He attended Indiana University Bloomington, where he initially studied Psychology until he began directing live theatre, performing sketch comedy, and writing screenplays. He moved to Los Angeles, where his work was shown at venues including The Upright Citizens Brigade Theatre, iO West, The Comedy Store, and the L.A. Comedy Shorts Film Festival.

== Career ==
=== Film and television ===
Waltke began his television career producing and directing documentaries for PBS affiliate WTIU. After moving to Los Angeles, he was hired by The National Lampoon as a writer and producer to create original content.

In 2012, he was hired to write a live-action feature film adaptation of The Brave Little Toaster. He was later hired to adapt a live action feature film version of the popular comic strip Heathcliff for the same company.

In 2014, he joined Guillermo del Toro's award-winning Netflix series Trollhunters produced by DreamWorks Animation, for which he was twice-nominated and won an Emmy Award in the category of "Best Writing for an Animated Program,” and received an Annie Award nomination for “Outstanding Achievement for Writing in an Animated Television / Broadcast Production”.

He became a showrunner and co-executive producer on the final installment of the franchise, Wizards: Tales of Arcadia, for which he co-wrote the pilot with Guillermo del Toro. He was nominated for an Emmy Award in the category of "Outstanding Children's Animated Series" and won a Kidscreen Award for "Best New Series".

In 2017, he served as a head writer for the Cartoon Network spinoff of The Lego Movie entitled Unikitty! produced by Warner Bros. Animation. While there, he co-wrote an episode of Teen Titans Go! for the same creative team.

In July 2019, Waltke joined the television show Star Trek: Prodigy as a writer and producer, later co-executive producer and co-head writer for the series. He previously collaborated with the show's creators, The Hageman Brothers, on Trollhunters. In 2022, he was nominated for an Emmy Award for "Outstanding Animated Series" for his work on the show. In 2023 and 2025, his work was twice nominated for a Television Critics Association Award in the category of "Outstanding Achievement in Family Programming." In 2024, his and others' contributions to Star Trek were honored with a Peabody Institutional Award.

In October 2020, Legion M announced that Waltke was attached to develop and executive produce an adult animated feature film with Powerhouse Animation based on George Mann's Ghosts of Manhattan novels, an action sci-fi noir story set in an alternate history 1920s New York.

In 2023, Waltke was hired to develop the story and script for the feature film Transformers One, a prequel film in the Transformers franchise.

In 2025, Waltke was announced as showrunner, executive producer, and head writer for Amazon Prime Video's television adaptation of the bestselling fantasy series Wings of Fire.

=== Comics and graphic novels ===
In 2023, Waltke was announced as a writer for DC Comics in the anthology, How to Lose a Guy Gardner in 10 Days. The collection explores the strange world of superhero romance in the DC Universe.

In 2025, Waltke became co-writer of Stan Lee's The Excelsiors, a graphic novel series based on Lee's final unpublished works set in an original superhero universe.

=== Published fiction ===
In 2025, Waltke was a finalist in Mystery Writers of America’s annual “Six Word Murder Mystery” contest. His story "Rookie" was published in the March/April 2026 issue of Alfred Hitchcock’s Mystery Magazine.

== Personal life ==
Waltke is married to fellow writer and published mystery author Ellen Tremiti. They reside in Los Angeles.

Waltke engages in youth activism and outreach. He was the keynote speaker at the 2018 RESET Technology & Creativity Conference, a bi-national event between El Paso, Texas, and Ciudad Juárez, Chihuahua, aimed at encouraging youth innovation, creativity, and opportunity across the Mexico–US border.

== Selected filmography ==
Aaron Waltke film and television work
Year	Title	Credit
2008–2010	National Lampoon's College Network	Writer, Producer, Director
2012–2013	Game Program Attack	Writer (7 episodes)
2016–2018	Trollhunters: Tales of Arcadia	Writer (52 episodes)
2017	Teen Titans Go!	Writer (1 episode)
2018–2020	Unikitty!	Head Writer (56 episodes)
2020	Wizards: Tales of Arcadia	Showrunner, Co-Executive Producer, Head Writer, Developed By (10 episodes)
2021–2023	Star Trek: Prodigy	Co-Executive Producer, Writer, Head Writer (40 episodes)
2024	Transformers One	Script and Story Development
2025–Present	Wings of Fire	Showrunner, Executive Producer, Head Writer, Developed By

== Awards and nominations ==
Year	Award	Category	Work	Result	Ref.
2013	Primetime Emmy Awards	Outstanding Creative Achievement In Interactive Media	The 3rd Annual Streamy Awards	Nominated	
2018	Kidscreen Awards	Best Writing	Trollhunters: Tales of Arcadia	Won	
2018	Annie Awards	Outstanding Achievement for Writing in an Animated Television / Broadcast Production	Trollhunters: Tales of Arcadia	Nominated	
2018	Daytime Emmy Awards	Outstanding Writing in an Animated Program	Trollhunters: Tales of Arcadia	Won	
2019	Daytime Emmy Awards	Outstanding Writing for an Animated Program	Trollhunters: Tales of Arcadia	Nominated	
2021	Daytime Emmy Awards	Outstanding Children's Animated Series	Wizards: Tales of Arcadia	Nominated	
2021	Kidscreen Awards	Best New Series	Wizards: Tales of Arcadia	Won	
2022	Children's and Family Emmy Awards	Outstanding Animated Series	Star Trek: Prodigy	Nominated	
2023	Television Critics Association Awards	Outstanding Achievement in Family Programming	Star Trek: Prodigy	Nominated	
2024	Peabody Awards	Peabody Institutional Award	Star Trek, Star Trek: Prodigy	Won	
2025	Television Critics Association Awards	Outstanding Achievement in Family Programming	Star Trek: Prodigy	Nominated	
2026	Children's and Family Emmy Awards	Outstanding Writing for a Children's or Young Teen Animated Series	Star Trek: Prodigy	Nominated	
