= Victor Raider-Wexler =

American film and television actor

- Other names: Victor Raider Wexler; Victor Wexler
- Occupation: Actor
- Years active: 1974–present

Victor Raider-Wexler is an American film and television actor, best known for roles as Stan in the sitcom Everybody Loves Raymond (1996–2004), the dual roles of Mr. Kaplan and Mr. Kaufman in the sitcom The King of Queens (2001–2007), Igor in the 2000 family comedy film The Adventures of Rocky and Bullwinkle (2000) and Judge B. Duff in Dr. Dolittle 2 (2001).

His voice roles in animation and video games include Tonoyama in Burn-Up Excess, Asimov in Geneshaft, Ray in American Dad!, Dr. Gennadi Volodnikov in Indiana Jones and the Infernal Machine, Vendel in Tales of Arcadia, and Fredric Estes in The Boss Baby: Back in Business.

== Career ==
Raider-Wexler started his career in the 1970s. He was the stage manager for the 1976 Broadway play Best Friend. In the 1980s, Wexler began acting in episodes of series such as Kate & Allie and Crime Story. However, Wexler's career catapulted in the 1990s with around 45 credits in the decade. Wexler appeared in The Wonder Years, Friends, Murder One, ER, Married... with Children, Saved by the Bell: The College Years, Alright Already, Dharma & Greg, Everybody Loves Raymond, House M.D., Without a Trace, and The War at Home. Perhaps because of his stern and low voice, Wexler often plays the role of a lawyer, judge or a doctor. Evidence of this are his appearances in A Friend to Die For, Murder One, Friends, Living Single, Buddy Faro, The Michael Richards Show, Three Sisters, Judging Amy, Sabrina, the Teenage Witch, The King of Queens, NYPD Blue, Boston Legal, and Seinfeld. He voiced the troll leader Vendel in the Netflix series Trollhunters. He also voiced Frederic Estes in the second season of the Netflix series The Boss Baby: Back in Business.

Raider-Wexler also starred as Hershel in the play Hershel and the Hanukkah Goblins at the Jewish Community Center of Greater Kansas City.

He played the role of Marley in the 2016 Christmas play A Christmas Carol at the Kansas City Repertory Theatre.

== Personal life ==
Raider-Wexler is a devout Jew.

== Filmography ==
=== Film ===
Year	Title	Role	Notes
1974	Benji	Payton Murrah	
1997	I Love You, Don't Touch Me!	Dad	
1997	The Fanatics	Executive	Alternative title: Fumbleheads
1998	Counter Measures	Minister Shikov	Direct-to-video
1998	Bury Me in Kern County	Mr. Decapato	
1998	Show & Tell	Lou	
1998	John		Short film
1999	The Story of Us	Dr. Hopkins	
1999	Treasure Island	Samowitz	
2000	The Adventures of Rocky & Bullwinkle	Igor	
2001	Dr. Dolittle 2	Judge B. Duff	
2002	Minority Report	Attorney General Nash	
2003	Die, Mommie, Die!	Sam Fishbein	
2003	Power Play	Dr. Eisley	
2004	Straight-Jacket	Saul	
2006	The Pursuit of Happyness	Charlie, the Landlord	
2007	Saturday Morning	Abe	
2007	Song of David	Rabbi Girshek	Short film
2010	Tranced	Mr. Gip	
2011	3 Blind Saints	Judge Cartwright	
2015	The Musical Genius of Moscow, Kansas	Czaslow	Short film
2018	All Creatures Here Below	Motel Clerk	
2019	It's Hell Getting Old		Short film
2020	The Boss Baby: Get that Baby!	Fredric Estes (voice)	Short film
2021	Trollhunters: Rise of the Titans	Vendel (voice)	

=== Television ===
Year	Title	Role	Notes
1977	Snowbeast	Deputy Holt	Television film
1985	All My Children	Jake	Episode: "#1.3895"
1985	Stone Pillow	Joe	Television film
1985	Kate & Allie	Vladimir Zhevchencho	Episode: "Dress to Kill"
1986	Crime Story	Mr. Levin	Episode: "Pilot"; Credited as Victor Raider Wexler
1987	Leg Work	Steiner	Episode: "Blind Trust"
1990	Monsters	Dr. Robert Winston	Episode: "Stressed Environment"
1990	Mathnet	Ernest Merchant	Episode: "The Case of the Parking Meter Massacre"; Credited as Victor Raider Wexler
1991	Law & Order	Harold Morton	Episode: "Mushrooms"
1993	The Wonder Years	"Pistol Pete" Pedermier	Episode: "Alice in Autoland"
1993	The Larry Sanders Show	Doctor	Episode: "The Breakdown: Part 1"; Credited as Victor Wexler
1993–1998	Seinfeld	Doctor, Dr. Wexler	4 episodes
1993	The Second Half	Art	Episode: "The Gym"
1994	Saved by the Bell: The College Years	Professor Rich	Episode: "Love and Death"
1994	Dream On	Shmool	Episode: "I Never Promised You Charoses, Martin"
1994	The John Larroquette Show	Man	Episode: "John and Carol"
1994	Death of a Cheerleader	Judge	Television film
1994	Law & Order	Defense Attorney Wheeler	Episode: "Family Values"
1995	Madman of the People	Johnny	Episode: "The Pen is Mightier Than the Sword"
1995	Liz: The Elizabeth Taylor Story	Joe Mankiewicz	Television film
1995	Brotherly Love	Mr. Levenstein	Episode: "Uptown Girl"
1995	Murder One	Dr. Cohen	Episode: "Chapter Five"
1995	Friends	Doctor Karl	Episode: "The One with the Baby on the Bus"
1995	Love & War	Doctor	Episode: "Tradition"
1996	Married... with Children	Floyd Babcock	Episode: "Calendar Girl"
1996	Sisters	Mr. Littlemeyer	Episode: "Nothing Personal"
1996	The John Larroquette Show	Samson	Episode: "Intern Writer"
1996	Living Single	Judge Wills	Episode: "Moi the Jury"
1996	The Drew Carey Show	Paul Van Houten	2 episodes
1996–2004	Everybody Loves Raymond	Stan	9 episodes
1996	Public Morals	Robber	Episode: "The Tuna Cover"
1996	3rd Rock from the Sun	Janitor	Episode: "Gobble, Gobble, Dick, Dick"
1997	ER	Vascular Doctor	Episode: "Fortune's Fools"
1997	Lois & Clark: The New Adventures of Superman	Dr. Dussel	Episode: "Meet John Doe"
1997	Extreme Ghostbusters	Additional voices	Episode: "Be Careful What You Wish For"
1997	NYPD Blue	Hyman Kozman	Episode: "Alice Doesn't Fit Here Anymore"
1997	Alright Already	Sol	2 episodes
1997	Burn-Up Excess	Tonoyama (voice)	English dub
1998	Caroline in the City	Marv	Episode: "Caroline and the Quiz Show"
1998	Significant Others	Lew Douglas	Television miniseries Episode: "Matters of Gravity"
1998	Working	Frank Thompson	Episode: "The Brown Noser"
1998	Maggie	Colleague	Episode: "Ballad of Maggie Day"
1999	NetForce	Moe Panzer	Television film
1999	Rugrats	Announcer, Delivery Man, Mr. G. (voice)	Episode: "Silent Angelica"
1999	The Jamie Foxx Show	Mayor Deerdon	Episode: "Fire and Desire: Part 2"
1999–2000	Batman Beyond	Guard, Muscles (voice)	2 episodes
1999	The Lot	Leo Sylver	Unknown episodes
1999	Stark Raving Mad	Nicholas	Episode: "Sometimes a Fritter Is Just a Fritter"
1999	Family Law	Phillip Reston	Episode: "Holt vs. Holt"
2000	The Michael Richards Show	Doctor	Episode: "Mr. Irresistible"
2000–2001	Two Guys, a Girl and a Pizza Place	Fire Chief Felix Shaw	9 episodes
2000	Buddy Faro	Dr. Studwell	Episode: "Done Away in a Manger"
2001	Three Sisters	Dr. Meltzer	Episode: "The Dry Spell"
2001	DAG	Senator Courtney	Episode: "Off the Record"
2001–2007	The King of Queens	Mr. Kaplan, Mr. Kaufman	11 episodes
2001	Geneshaft	Asimov (voice)	Episode: "Hoshi wo tsugu mono" Credited as Victor Raider Wexler
2001	It's Like, You Know...	Funeral Director	Episode: "The Quick and the Dead"
2001	The Beast	Consul General	Episode: "Travinia: Part 1"
2001	Men Behaving Badly	Lou the Furrier	Episode: "The Fur Man Cometh"
2001	Inside Schwartz	Richard	Episode: "Play-Action Fake Boyfriend"
2002	The Tick	Stanistoff	Episode: "The Tick vs. Justice"
2002	Dharma & Greg	Leo, Marty Hoffman	2 episodes
2002	Judging Amy	Dr. Norwood	Episode: "Cause for Alarm"
2002	The West Wing	Bernie, Panel Member on TV	Episode: "Process Stories"
2002	Reba	Cranky Old Man	Episode: "Cookies for Santa"
2002	Life at Five Feet	Mr. Marshack	Television film
2003	Sabrina the Teenage Witch	The Judge	Episode: "In Sabrina We Trust"
2003	Angel	Magnus Hainsley	Episode: "Just Rewards"
2003–2004	Oliver Beene	Super	3 episodes
2003	Secret Santa	Bob	Television film
2004	Eve	Nick's Boss	Episode: "Party All the Time"
2004	Crossing Jordan	Maury	Episode: "Revealed"
2004	Boston Legal	Dr. Bender	Episode: "Still Crazy After All These Years"
2004	NYPD Blue	Judge Kolisch	2 episodes
2005	Committed	Russian Cleaners Man	Episode: "The Pilot Episode"
2005	House	Judge Winter	Episode: "DNR"
2005	Numbers	Eddie	Episode: "Counterfeit Reality"
2005	Without a Trace	Mr. Keoneke	Episode: "Second Sight"
2006	The War at Home	Rabbi	Episode: "13 Going on $30,000"
2006	Courting Alex	Mr. Hankers	Episode: "A Moving Story"
2007	NCIS	Patrick Carmody	Episode: "Suspicion"
2007–2013	American Dad!	Ray (voice)	6 episodes
2007	Legion of Super Heroes	Dr. Neerg, Reptilian Scientist (voice)	Episode: "Cry Wolf"
2007	'Til Death	Marshall Duffy	Episode: "The Colleague"
2016–2018	Trollhunters: Tales of Arcadia	Vendel (voice)	23 episodes
2018	The Boss Baby: Back in Business	Frederic Estes (voice)	7 episodes
2019	3Below: Tales of Arcadia	Vendel (voice)	Episode: "The Big Sleep"
2020	Wizards: Tales of Arcadia	Vendel (voice)	3 episodes

=== Video games ===
Year	Title	Role	Notes
1997	The Curse of Monkey Island	Slappy Cromwell, Snowcone Guy	
1999	Star Trek: Hidden Evil	Romulan Guard, Computer	Credited as Victor Raider Wexler
1999	Indiana Jones and the Infernal Machine	Dr. Gennadi Volodnikov	
2001	Floigan Bros.	Baron Malodorous	Credited as Victor Raider Wexler
2001	Star Wars: Galactic Battlegrounds	Empire Scout Captain, Prowler Submarine Captain	
2003	The Lord of the Rings: War of the Ring	Saruman	
2003	The Hobbit	Balin, The Master of Laketown	Credited as Victor Raider Wexler
2003	James Bond 007: Everything or Nothing	Additional voices	
2004	Call of Duty: Finest Hour	Additional voices	
2004	GoldenEye: Rogue Agent	Additional voices	
2005	Champions: Return to Arms	Additional voices	
2006	SWAT 4: The Stetchkov Syndicate	Old Man Hostage, Lionel MacArthur	
2006	Saints Row	Radio Voice	Credited as Victor Raider Wexler
2006	Guild Wars: Nightfall	Prince Ahmtur the Mighty, additional voices	
2007	Supreme Commander	Additional voices	Credited as Victor Raider Wexler
2007	Supreme Commander: Forged Alliance	Additional voices	
2007	Golden Axe: Beast Rider	Additional voices	
2010	Darksiders	Additional voices	Credited as Victor Wexler
2011	The Elder Scrolls V: Skyrim	Mehrunes Dagon	
