= 3Below: Tales of Arcadia =

2018 animated web series

- Promotional poster
- Genre: Action; Adventure; Science fiction; Comedy drama
- Created by: Guillermo del Toro
- Based on: Characters by Guillermo del Toro and Daniel Kraus
- Showrunners: Guillermo del Toro; Marc Guggenheim
- Directed by: Rodrigo Blaas
- Voices of: Tatiana Maslany; Diego Luna; Nick Offerman; Glenn Close; Frank Welker; Alon Aboutboul
- Theme music composer: The Crystal Method
- Opening theme: "3 Below"
- Composer: Jeff Danna
- Country of origin: United States
- Original language: English
- No. of seasons: 2
- No. of episodes: 26

Production
- Executive producers: Guillermo del Toro; Rodrigo Blaas; Marc Guggenheim; Chad Hammes
- Producers: Steven Schweickart; Jaena Sta. Ana
- Running time: 24 minutes
- Production companies: Double Dare You Productions; DreamWorks Animation Television

Original release
- Network: Netflix
- Release: December 21, 2018 – July 12, 2019

Related
- Trollhunters: Tales of Arcadia; Wizards: Tales of Arcadia

3Below: Tales of Arcadia (or simply 3Below) is an American animated science fiction television series produced by DreamWorks Animation, and is the second installment of Guillermo del Toro's Tales of Arcadia trilogy.

The series was announced on December 12, 2017 by Netflix and DreamWorks. On October 5, 2018, the premiere date was announced and the first teaser was released. The 13-episode first season was released on December 21, 2018 on Netflix, set during the third season of Trollhunters. The series concluded with the release of the second season that serves as a sequel to Trollhunters, and was released on July 12, 2019.

A third and final installment of Tales of Arcadia, titled Wizards, was released on August 7, 2020. The full-length feature film, Trollhunters: Rise of the Titans was released on Netflix on July 21, 2021.

== Plot ==
Two royal extraterrestrial siblings, Crown Princess Aja and Crown Prince Krel of House Tarron, their dog-like pet named Luug, and their bodyguard, Varvatos Vex, escape from their home planet of Akiridion-5 after a coup and crash-land on Earth, specifically in the city of Arcadia Oaks, California. There, the aliens adjust to human culture and try to fix their spaceship (as well as restore their nearly-dead parents King Fialkov and Queen Coranda) to return and take back Akiridion-5, which is being taken over by an evil dictator known as General Val Morando, who has already sent out a team of intergalactic bounty hunters, called the Zeron Brotherhood, to find and catch the alien prince and princess.

After investigating a way to stop Val Morando and find the hiding place of Aja and Krel, Zadra, one of the noble protectors of the royals from Akiridion-5, arrives on Earth. Meanwhile, after learning of his involvement in Morando's coup, Aja and Krel decide to exile Vex. During his exile, Vex is captured by the Zeron Brotherhood and imprisoned at a bounty hunter outpost located on Earth's moon. In Season 2, Aja and Krel learn of his capture and launch a rescue mission. Soon after the rescue, however the gang discovers that Morando is heading for Earth. After successfully defeating him, Aja (now Queen), Vex, Zadra, Luug and the rest finally return home, joined by Eli, who has volunteered to be Earth's ambassador on Akiridion 5. Crown Prince Krel decides that Earth has become his home, and decides to stay with his new human best friends.

== Voice cast ==
=== Extra Terrestrial Life ===
- Tatiana Maslany as Princess Aja Tarron/Queen Coranda Tarron
- Diego Luna as Prince Krel Tarron
- Nick Offerman as Varvatos Vex
- Glenn Close as the Mothership
- Frank Welker as Luug
- Alon Aboutboul as Val Morando
- Andy Garcia as Fialkov Tarron
- Tom Kenny as Dadblank
- Cheryl Hines as Momblank
- Nick Frost as Stuart
- Darin De Paul as Zeron Alpha
- Ann Dowd as Zeron Omega
- Hayley Atwell as Zadra
- Jennifer Hale as Izita
- Chris Obi as Loth Saborian
- Danny Trejo as Tronos Madu
- Fred Tatasciore as:
  - Neb
  - Magmatron
- Fiona Shaw as Birdie / Halcon
- Kathleen Turner as Gwendolyn

=== Earthlings ===
- Uzo Aduba as Colonel Kubritz
- Oscar Nuñez as Sergeant Costas
- Cole Sand as Eli Pepperjack
- Steven Yeun as Steve Palchuk
- J.B. Smoove as Phil
- Reginald VelJohnson as Jerry
- Tom Wilson as Coach Lawrence
- Charlie Saxton as Toby Domzalski
- Fred Tatasciore as:
  - AAARRRGGHH!!!
  - Senior Uhl
- Emile Hirsch as Jim Lake Jr.
- Lexi Medrano as Claire Nuñez
- Kelsey Grammer as Blinky
- Jonathan Hyde as Stricklander
- Laraine Newman as:
  - Nancy Domzalski / Nana
  - Ms. Janeth
- Jimmie Wood as NotEnrique
- Steve Alterman as Seamus Johnson
- Alfred Molina as Archie
- Lauren Tom as Mary Wang
- Yara Shahidi as Darci Scott
- Bebe Wood as Shannon
- Nathan Foley as Kanjigar the Courageous
- Victor Raider-Wexler as Vendel
- Clancy Brown as Gunmar
- Matthew Waterson as Mr. Johnson
- Ike Amadi as Detetive Scott
- Guillermo del Toro as Dr. Muelas
- Rodrigo Blaas as Gnome Chompsky
- Andrea Navedo as Mrs. Nuñez
- Tom Kenny as Officer Brennen
- Colin O'Donoghue as Douxie "Big D"

Princess Aja and Prince Krel also appeared in the Trollhunters episodes "In Good Hands" and "The Eternal Knight, Part 1" in their borrowed human forms.

== Episodes ==
=== Series overview ===
| Season | Episodes | Originally released |
|---|---|---|
| 1 | 13 | December 21, 2018 |
| 2 | 13 | July 12, 2019 |

=== Season 1 (2018) ===
| No. overall | No. in season | Title | Directed by | Written by | Original release date |
|---|---|---|---|---|---|
Part 1
| 1–2 | 1–2 | "Terra Incognita" | Guillermo del Toro and Rodrigo Blaas | Guillermo del Toro and Marc Guggenheim | December 21, 2018 |
After a tyrant invades their parents' monarchy and their home planet, teenage aliens Prince Krel and Princess Aja and their bodyguard Varvatos Vex land for safety on Earth. After crash-landing in the town of Arcadia, California, the royal siblings search for useful technology in order to power their spaceship.
| 3 | 3 | "Mind Over Matter" | Johane Matte | Matthew Chauncey, Aaron Eisenberg, Will Eisenberg, and Lila Scott | December 21, 2018 |
Crown Prince Krel builds a mind-reading device in hopes of blending in with humans. Elsewhere, General Morando dispatches bounty hunters to track down the royals. Princess Aja and Prince Krel find another alien disguised as a human.
| 4 | 4 | "Beetle Mania" | Elaine Bogan | Aaron Eisenberg and Will Eisenberg | December 21, 2018 |
Royal super-fan Stuart offers to help eradicate an infestation of technology-eating alien beetles called Skeltegs before it exposes the siblings' true identities.
| 5 | 5 | "Collision Course" | Andrew Schmidt | Matthew Chauncey | December 21, 2018 |
The royals take a driver's ed class, hoping to find parts for their ship. Instead, they're led on a high-speed chase with the Zeron Brotherhood.
| 6 | 6 | "D'aja Vu" | Johane Matte | A. C. Bradley | December 21, 2018 |
A time-traveling giant troll wreaks havoc at the school science fair, threatening to expose both the troll world – and the royals' true identities. To defeat him, the Trollhunters and the royals must destroy the alien technology the troll is using, at the cost of forgetting they had met.
| 7 | 7 | "Flying the Coop" | Johane Matte | Lila Scott | December 21, 2018 |
Krel and Dadblank are attacked by a mysterious bounty hunter, injuring Dadblank. Aja and Krel are summoned by a member of the school board named "Birdie" to produce proper identification. Dadblank and Momblank are renamed Ricky and Lucy. Birdie attacks and is revealed to be the bounty hunter who attacked Krel and Dadblank earlier. Zadra and the resistance discover the identity of the traitor who aided the coup.
| 8 | 8 | "Party Crashers" | Elaine Bogan | A. C. Bradley | December 21, 2018 |
An incoming message from Akiridion-5 alarms Vex. Meanwhile, the arrival of the Zerons ruins the royals' outing in the woods with friends.
| 9 | 9 | "Lightning in a Bottle" | Andrew Schmidt | Aaron Eisenberg and Will Eisenberg | December 21, 2018 |
Aja & Krel are searching for Aja’s missing serrator in the forest until Aja spots something glowing in Jim Lake Jr’s bag, believing it to be her missing weapon. At school, Steve Palchick (who has Aja’s missing weapon) tries to figure out how the weapon works but it's taken away by Principal Señor Uhl, who assigns Jim to show both Aja & Krel around Arcadia. Gnome Chompsky ultimately finds the serrator, alerting Varvatos Vex, who tries to retrieve it. Aja & Krel help Jim and his friends by putting lighting inside a bottle. Stuart manages to retrieve the serrator and leaves it on the door steps of the house of Tarrons, making it look like it was Steve who did it. Krel and classmate Seamus begin a math duel, which Krel ultimately allows to Seamus win. On Akiradion-5, General Morando presents the new blanks, Ocular Mechanically Engineered Neutralizers (O.M.E.N).: This episode is connected with Trollhunters: Tales of Arcadia episode "In Good Hands".
| 10 | 10 | "The Arcadian Job" | Johane Matte and John Laus | Matthew Chauncey | December 21, 2018 |
In a daring heist, the royals and Stuart infiltrate high-security military base Area 49-B in hopes of stealing the final part to power the Mothership.
| 11 | 11 | "Truth Be Told" | Elaine Bogan | Lila Scott | December 21, 2018 |
Princess Aja decides to tell Steve she's actually an alien, but her confession is cut short by a visit from the Zeron Brotherhood. Zadra arrives on Earth, unwittingly bringing the O.M.E.N. with her.
| 12 | 12 | "Last Night on Earth" | Andrew Schmidt | Matthew Chauncey, Aaron Eisenberg, and Will Eisenberg | December 21, 2018 |
The royals celebrate their last day on school – and on Earth – with friends, but Zadra's arrival with revelations of Varvatos's betrayal shakes them to the core. Meanwhile, Gunmar and Morgana attack Arcadia and the alien royals help Steve and Eli take out some goblins.
| 13 | 13 | "Bad Omen" | Rodrigo Blaas | A. C. Bradley and Lila Scott | December 21, 2018 |
Zeron Alpha unleashes a barrage of attacks on the siblings, enabling Omen to hijack the ship and take the royal cores. Alpha Akiridion-naps Varvatos Vex.

=== Season 2 (2019) ===
| No. overall | No. in season | Title | Directed by | Written by | Original release date |
|---|---|---|---|---|---|
Part 2
| 14 | 1 | "Moving Day" | Andrew Schmidt | Lila Scott | July 12, 2019 |
Left vulnerable after Omen's attack (and following its defeat and return of the royal cores of the Queen and King), the extraterrestrial heirs look to conceal their damaged ship but are soon confronted by the bounty hunter Magmatron.
| 15 | 2 | "Moonlight Run" | Johane Matte | Matthew Chauncey | July 12, 2019 |
Princess Aja and Prince Krel enlist Stuart to help find their former ally Vex, who's being held prisoner at a bounty hunter outpost on the moon. A secretly defected Loth Saborian reveals that Morando has made an army of Omen robots and is heading for Earth.
| 16 | 3 | "Dogfight Days of Summer" | Elaine Bogan | Aaron Eisenberg & Will Eisenberg | July 12, 2019 |
With General Morando's invasion of Earth imminent, Krel tries to stop the fleet's advance with a video game and unwitting help from the kids of Arcadia. At the end of the episode, a new bounty hunter arrives on Earth in a flash of lightning.
| 17 | 4 | "Mother's Day" | Andrew L. Schmidt | Matthew Chauncey | July 12, 2019 |
Mother, the AI controlling the royals' ship, reflects on keeping the peace between her quarreling family. Morando discovers a secret hidden on Earth and captures Loth Saborian. Colonel Kubritz from Area 49-B teams up with the captured bounty hunter after she noticed it causing problems as it looked for Aja and Krel.
| 18 | 5 | "Ill Gotten Gains" | Elaine Bogan & Francisco Ruiz Velasco | Ian Rickett | July 12, 2019 |
Colonel Kubritz stages a phony quarantine of Arcadia Oaks High School in a ploy to capture the royals -- and their advanced weapons technology -- with help from the bounty hunter, Tronos. After she fires on him so she can get the royals to study (allowing them to escape), Morando make contact with her.
| 19 | 6 | "There's Something About Gwen (of Gorbon)" | Johane Matte | Aaron Eisenberg & Will Eisenberg | July 12, 2019 |
Stuart gets an unexpected visit from his bounty hunter ex-girlfriend, Gwendolen; Prince Krel helps Toby and Eli produce a short film, "Kleb or Alive," for a local contest.
| 20 | 7 | "Asteroid Rage" | Andrew Schmidt | Matthew Chauncey, Aaron Eisenberg & Will Eisenberg & Lila Scott | July 12, 2019 |
Unable to stop an asteroid hurtling toward Earth, Kubritz pleads with the royals to help destroy it by offering stored alien technology from Area 49-B, before betraying them to Morando.
| 21 | 8 | "Luug's Day Out" | Johane Matte | Lila Scott | July 12, 2019 |
Krel finally builds a prototype device that will create a wormhole back to Akiridion-5, but Luug swallows it whole before it can be tested further and transports himself all over Arcadia.
| 22 | 9 | "The Fall of House Tarron" | Francisco Ruiz Velasco & Elaine Bogan | AC Bradley | July 12, 2019 |
The last defenders of House Tarron face off against General Morando and his army of Omen blanks in an all-out battle for survival in the Mothership. Mother is destroyed and downloads herself into an OMEN.
| 23 | 10 | "The Big Sleep" | Rodrigo Blaas | Matthew Chauncey | July 12, 2019 |
With General Morando searching for the all-powerful Gaylen's Core, Aja and Krel must travel into their parents' own subconscious to learn the Core's location before their archenemy does.
| 24 | 11 | "Race to Trollmarket" | Andrew Schmidt | Aaron Eisenberg & Will Eisenberg & Lila Scott | July 12, 2019 |
After learning that Kanjigar was given Gaylen's Core by the Royals' parents centuries ago on Earth, Toby calls Trollhunter Jim Lake, and Blinky advises the royals to consult the Soothscryer, which sends them to the Deep to retrieve it, only for them to lead Morando to the Core, allowing him to take it.
| 25–26 | 12–13 | "A Glorious End" | Francisco Ruiz Velasco (Part 1) Rodrigo Blaas & Johane Matte (Part 2) | AC Bradley, Marc Guggenheim, Ian Rickett & Lila Scott | July 12, 2019 |
As the town of Arcadia gathers for the premiere of Kleb or Alive, an army of Omens, led by an armored Kubritz, make plans to lure out the royals. With the fate of the universe at stake, the royal heirs and their allies must gather their forces for the ultimate battle to defeat General Morando, who has gained immense extraterrestrial power from Gaylen's Core. The newly returned King and Queen sacrifice themselves to power the rebuilt Seklos's Cannon and defeat Morando. Aja leaves for Akaridion-5 while Krel remains on Earth and Steve, Toby & AAARRRGGHH!!! are approached by Archie, who warns them about the world as they know it is about to end, setting up the stage for the Wizards saga.

== Reception ==
=== Critical response ===
The series currently holds a 100% on Rotten Tomatoes. It has been praised for its depiction of immigration through a sci-fi lens, with Dave Trumbore of Collider writing, "... the subtext here, which is hard to miss even for younger viewers, is that Aja, Krel, and Vex are stand-ins for immigrants, refugees, and "illegal aliens" ... the show is re-examining the actions of the anti-immigrant government agents and the aliens' allies alike."

=== Accolades ===
| Year | Award | Category | Nominee(s) | Result |
|---|---|---|---|---|
| 2019 | Annie Awards | Outstanding Achievement for Directing in an Animated Television / Broadcast Production | Guillermo del Toro and Rodrigo Blaas, "Terra Incognita, Part 1" | Nominated |
| 2019 | Annie Awards | Outstanding Achievement for Editorial in an Animated Television / Broadcast Production | John Laus, Graham Fisher, "Terra Incognita, Part 1" | Nominated |
| 2019 | Daytime Emmy Awards | Outstanding Main Title and Graphic Design for an Animated Program | Rodrigo Blaas, Michael Smukavic, Alfonso Blaas, Brandon Tyra, Greg Lev, Igor Lodeiro, John Laus | Nominated |
| 2019 | Daytime Emmy Awards | Outstanding Sound Mixing for an Animated Program | Carlos Sanches, Aran Tanchum | Won |
| 2019 | Daytime Emmy Awards | Outstanding Sound Editing for an Animated Program | Otis Van Osten, James Miller, Jason Oliver, Vincent Guisetti | Nominated |
| 2020 | Annie Awards | Outstanding Achievement for Animated Effects in an Animated Television/Broadcast Production | Greg Lev, Igor Lodeiro, Chen Ling, Brandon Tyra | Nominated |
| 2020 | Annie Awards | Best Animated Television/Broadcast Production for Children | Guillermo del Toro, Rodrigo Blaas, Chad Hammes, Marc Guggenheim | Nominated |
| 2020 | Daytime Emmy Awards | Outstanding Sound Editing for an Animated Program | Otis Van Osten, Jason Oliver, Carlos Sanchez, Tommy Sarioglou, Aran Tanchum, Vincent Guisetti, James Miller | Nominated |
| 2020 | Golden Reel Awards | Outstanding Achievement in Sound Editing - Animation Short Form | Supervising Sound Editor: Otis Van Osten, Foley Editor: Tommy Sarioglou, Dialogue Editors: Carlos Sanches, Jason Oliver, Foley Artist: Aran Tanchum, Vincent Guisetti, "3Below: Tales of Arcadia" | Won |
