= Ike Amadi =

Nigerian voice actor (born 1979)

- Born: Ikechukwu Prince Amadi; 26 November 1979 (age 46); Nigeria
- Education: University of Missouri; University of Missouri–Kansas City
- Occupation: Voice actor
- Years active: 2005–present
- Notable work: Mass Effect 3 as Javik; Halo 5: Guardians as Jameson Locke; Injustice 2 as Atrocitus; Mortal Kombat 11 and 1 as Shao Kahn

Ikechukwu Prince Amadi (born 26 November 1979) is a Nigerian-American voice actor. He is known for voicing Javik in Mass Effect 3, Jameson Locke in Halo 5: Guardians, Atriox in Halo Infinite, Shao Kahn in Mortal Kombat 11 and Mortal Kombat 1, Atrocitus in Injustice 2, and the Democracy Officer in Helldivers 2.

== Early life ==
Amadi was born in Nigeria, on 26 November 1979. He and his family moved to the United States, where he attended and graduated from the University of Missouri–Kansas City.

== Career ==
Amadi has provided the voice of Jax Briggs in the direct-to-video animated films Mortal Kombat Legends: Scorpion's Revenge (2020) and Mortal Kombat Legends: Battle of the Realms (2021), respectively.

== Filmography ==
=== Film ===
Year	Title	Role	Notes	Refs
2020	Mortal Kombat Legends: Scorpion's Revenge	Jax Briggs	Voice, direct-to-video	
2020	Superman: Man of Tomorrow	Martian Manhunter	Voice, direct-to-video	
2021	Mortal Kombat Legends: Battle of the Realms	Jax Briggs, One Being	Voice, direct-to-video	
2022	Green Lantern: Beware My Power	Martian Manhunter	Voice, direct-to-video	
2023	Justice League: Warworld	Martian Manhunter	Voice, direct-to-video	
2024	Justice League: Crisis on Infinite Earths	Martian Manhunter, Amazing Man, Professor Ivo	Voice, direct-to-video	

=== Television ===
Year	Title	Role	Notes
2012	Electric City	Additional voices	Web series
2016	Roots	Narrator	Voice, miniseries
2016–18	Trollhunters: Tales of Arcadia	Angor Rot, Detective Scott	Voice, 21 episodes
2017–18	Voltron: Legendary Defender	Commander Branko, Galra Commander, Galra Guard #2	Voice, 3 episodes
2018–19	Avengers Assemble	M'Baku / Man-Ape	Voice, 3 episodes
2018–19	3Below: Tales of Arcadia	Detective Scott	Voice, 7 episodes
2019–21	Love, Death & Robots	Platoon Sergeant, Officer Mantus	Voice, 2 episodes
2020	Wizards: Tales of Arcadia	Angor Rot	Voice, episode: "Lady of the Lake"
2021	What If...?	O'Bengh	Voice, episode: "What If... Doctor Strange Lost His Heart Instead of His Hands?"
2023	The Legend of Vox Machina	Earthbreaker Groon	Voice, 2 episodes
2024	Jurassic World: Chaos Theory	Dr. Sarr	Voice, 2 episodes
2025	Tomb Raider: The Legend of Lara Croft	Oko	Voice

=== Video games ===
Year	Title	Voice role	Notes
2008	007: Quantum of Solace	Mollaka	
2010	Command & Conquer 4: Tiberian Twilight	NOD #1	Uncredited
2010	StarCraft II: Wings of Liberty	Additional voices	
2011	The Lord of the Rings: War in the North	Gwaihir, Gorin	
2012	Mass Effect 3	Javik, Prothean VI, additional voices	From Ashes DLC
2013	Grand Theft Auto V	Additional voices	
2013	Knack	Knack	Credited as Ikechukwu Prince Amadi
2014	World of Warcraft: Warlords of Draenor	Farseer Drek'Thar, Fel Lord Zakuun	
2014	Wolfenstein: The New Order	Camp Prisoner	
2014	Skylanders: Trap Team	Jawbreaker	
2014	Call of Duty: Advanced Warfare	Additional voices	
2014	Lego Batman 3: Beyond Gotham	Atrocitus, Martian Manhunter, Gorilla Grodd, Bronze Tiger, John Stewart	
2015	Infinite Crisis	Atrocitus	
2015	Disney Infinity 3.0	Additional voices	
2015	Skylanders: SuperChargers	Jawbreaker, The Darkness	
2015	Halo 5: Guardians	Jameson Locke	
2015	Call of Duty: Black Ops III	Additional voices	
2015	Fallout 4	Davies, Diamond City Guard	
2015	StarCraft II: Legacy of the Void	Anihilator, Destroyer	
2016	Mafia III	Additional Voices	Credited as Ike Amandi
2016	World of Warcraft: Legion	Rokmora	
2016	Dishonored 2	Elite Guards	
2016	Final Fantasy XV	Titan	English dub
2017	Mass Effect: Andromeda	Taavos, additional voices	
2017	Prey	Dr. Dayo Igwe	
2017-18	Injustice 2	Atrocitus	Also the Legendary Edition of the game
2017	Farpoint	Dr. Grant Moon	
2017	Guild Wars 2: Path of Fire	Gorrik, Efram Greetsglory, additional voices	
2017	Knack II	Knack	Credited as Ikechukwu Prince Amadi
2017	Middle-earth: Shadow of War	Baranor	
2018	Spider-Man	David Obademi	Silver Linings DLC
2018	Call of Duty: Black Ops 4	Additional voices	
2018	Lego DC Super-Villains	Atrocitus, Martian Manhunter	
2019-20	Mortal Kombat 11	Shao Kahn, Cyrax	Also in Aftermath and Ultimate
2019	Crash Team Racing Nitro-Fueled	Crunch Bandicoot	
2019	Tom Clancy's Rainbow Six Siege	Wamai	
2019	Death Stranding	William Lake	
2020	Fallout 76: Wastelanders	Creed, Kogan, Sergeant Fred Radcliff	
2020	Iron Man VR	Nick Fury	
2020	Trollhunters: Defenders of Arcadia	Angor Rot	
2020	Star Wars: Squadrons	Additional voices	
2020	Spider-Man: Miles Morales	Aaron Davis / Prowler	
2020	The Elder Scrolls Online	Rada Al-Saran	
2020	Legends of Runeterra	Azir	
2021	No More Heroes III	Jeane, Notorious	
2021	Apex Legends	Seer	
2021	Halo Infinite	Atriox	
2022	Guild Wars 2: End of Dragons	Gorrik	
2023	Starfield	Commander Kibwe Ikande	
2023	Mortal Kombat 1	General Shao	
2023	Spider-Man 2	Aaron Davis	
2023	Mortal Kombat: Onslaught	Shao Kahn	
2024	Helldivers 2	Democracy Officer	
2024	Dragon Age: The Veilguard	Davrin	
