= Nowhere Man (comics) =

Nowhere Man is a comic limited series from Virgin Comics.

The series was an odyssey of futuristic science fiction, in an epoch where man has traded privacy for safety. It was written by Australian actor Hugh Jackman and Marc Guggenheim, who wrote stories for Wolverine and The Amazing Spider-Man and created Eli Stone, with art from Paul Gulacy.

Jackman affirmed in a bulletin that he hoped that the Nowhere Man comic would reach sufficient popularity and turn into a movie.

== Creative team ==
- Hugh Jackman and Marc Guggenheim: story and script
- Paul Gulacy: artist

== Release and hype ==
Nowhere Man was solicited as launching in October 2008. Virgin Comics hyped the series with a contest called Be a Real Nowhere Man, where fans could win the prize of having their likeness drawn into upcoming issues of Nowhere Man.
