= Brunico Communications =

Canadian magazine publishing company

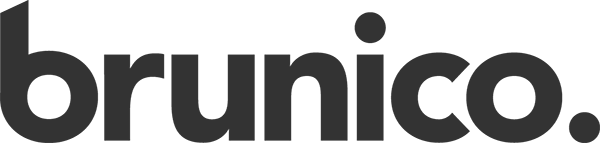
Brunico Communications logo

Brunico Communications is a Canadian magazine publishing company. The company specializes primarily in online trade magazines serving media industries, including the magazines Playback, Realscreen, Kidscreen and Strategy.

The company has also owned and operated the Banff World Media Festival, one of the world's largest film and television industry conferences, since 2016.

It also oversees the Kidscreen Awards, a ceremony which focuses on recognizing outstanding achievement in youth entertainment, including categories in Preschool, Children, and Young Adult programming in television and film.

== History ==
The company was established by James Shenkman in 1986. Soon after unsuccessfully applying for a Canadian Radio-television and Telecommunications Commission license for a radio station in Mississauga, he identified a gap in Canadian coverage of media industries, and formed the company to launch Playback, a magazine covering Canadian film and television production. In 1989, the company launched Strategy, an advertising and business magazine, and in 1996, it launched KidScreen, covering news in children's film and television.

Other later titles included Boards, devoted to advertising commercial production; Media in Canada, covering general media industry news; and RealScreen, devoted to documentary and non-fiction film and television.

In 2010, the company stopped print publication of Playback, transitioning it to an online-only magazine, and shut down Boards.

In 2016, Brunico acquired Marketing, a title which had formerly competed with Strategy, from Rogers Media. Marketing was merged with Strategy.

== Kidscreen and The Kidscreen Awards ==
Kidscreen is an international magazine devoted to engaging the global children's entertainment industry. They publish a quarterly printed magazine and an industry news site, and also host the annual Kidscreen Summit, a conference gathering industry and journalism professionals.

The Kidscreen Awards take place during the Kidscreen Summit, an event dedicated to honoring achievements in television and film for children and young adults, recognizing outstanding programming in a range of categories from across the entertainment industry.

== Realscreen and The Realscreen Awards ==
Realscreen is "the only international magazine devoted exclusively to the non-fiction film and television industries", publishes a quarterly printed magazine, hosts a website which includes breaking news and industry information, and runs the annual Realscreen Summit.

The Realscreen Awards take place during the Realscreen Summit, presenting awards to unscripted and non-fiction film media in a range of categories.

== PLAYBACK and The Banff World Media Festival ==
Founded in 1979, the Banff World Media Festival (formerly known as the Banff World Television Festival) is an international media event held in the Canadian Rockies at the Fairmont Banff Springs Hotel in Banff, Alberta, Canada. The festival is dedicated to world television and digital content and its creation and development, and is owned and operated by Brunico Communications.

As well as honouring excellence in international television, professionals from around the world participate in seminars, master classes, and pitching opportunities. Film directors, screenwriters, and producers from PBS, BBC, NHK, Arte, Channel 4, ABC, Sony Pictures, HBO, CBC, NFB, SBS, and many other broadcasters and production companies attend the annual event.

The festival provides a global platform for industry members to discuss and debate, and explore current issues, challenges and trends.

Playback is an online Canadian film, broadcasting, and interactive media trade journal owned by Brunico Communications. It was previously published biweekly as a print magazine for the Canadian entertainment industry. The first issue of Playback magazine was published, in tabloid format, on 29 September 1986.

The magazine has since begun to report on advancements in the online digital media industry as well, specifically web series and related events, media, and culture. The magazine also reports on funding resources for filmmakers, technical advancements in the industry, and trends. It is widely considered to be a "must read" amongst industry professionals.

In May 2010, Playback stopped publishing its biweekly print edition and became an exclusively online magazine.
