= Trollhunters =

Trollhunters may refer to:

- Trollhunters, an installment of the Tales of Arcadia trilogy
  - Trollhunters: Tales of Arcadia, 2016-2018 animated series
  - Trollhunters: Rise of the Titans, 2021 film finale
  - Trollhunters: The Adventure Begins, (2017) Tales of Arcadia novel
  - Trollhunters: Welcome to the Darklands, (2017) Tales of Arcadia novel
  - Trollhunters: The Book of Ga-Huel, (2018) Tales of Arcadia novel
  - Trollhunters: Age of the Amulet, (2018) Tales of Arcadia novel
  - Trollhunters: The Way of the Wizard, (2018) Tales of Arcadia novel
  - Trollhunters: Angor Reborn (2018), Tales of Arcadia novel
  - Trollhunters: The Secret History of Trollkind, (2018) Tales of Arcadia comic
  - Trollhunters: The Felled, (2018) Tales of Arcadia comic
  - Trollhunters: Defenders of Arcadia, video game based on the series

== See also ==
- Trollhunter, 2010 Norwegian dark fantasy film (unrelated)
