= Onward (soundtrack) =

Onward (Original Motion Picture Soundtrack)

Soundtrack album by Mychael and Jeff Danna
- Released: February 28, 2020
- Recorded: 2019–20
- Venues: Eastwood Scoring Stage, Warner Bros. Studios Burbank
- Studio: Abbey Road Studios
- Genre: Score
- Length: 1:03:23
- Label: Walt Disney

Mychael Danna chronology
The Addams Family (2019)	Onward (2020)	Stillwater (2021)

Jeff Danna chronology
The Addams Family (2019)	Onward (2020)	Trollhunters: Rise of the Titans (2021)

Onward (Original Motion Picture Soundtrack) is the soundtrack album to the 2020 Disney/Pixar film of the same name. The score is composed by Mychael and Jeff Danna, in their second Pixar film, following The Good Dinosaur (2015). The scoring was held respectively at Abbey Road Studios in London (as the second Pixar film to be scored there after Brave) and the Eastwood Scoring Stage at Warner Bros. in Los Angeles which required a 30-member choir and 92-member orchestra.

The original soundtrack included the original song called "Carried Me With You" performed by Brandi Carlile. It was released by Walt Disney Records on February 28, 2020, seven days ahead of the film's release.

The Japanese dub uses Sukima Switch's "Zenryoku Syounen" as the credits theme.

== Background ==
On April 16, 2019, Mychael and Jeff Danna, who both previously worked with the studio on The Good Dinosaur (2015), were revealed to be the film's composers. When the Danna brothers were approached by director Dan Scanlon to compose the musical score, they did not know anything about the film before their meeting with the Onward team. At The Hollywood Reporter, Mychael says, "As [Dan Scanlon is] pitching this story, the hairs on the back of our necks are just going up. Because this is really familiar personal territory for us." His brother Jeff says, "It's a pretty uncommon request in our business to do a '70s prog-rock-wizard combination for a masterful film — a Pixar film. We had a lot of fun starting there and put together a great band."

The scoring was held respectively at Abbey Road Studios in London and the Eastwood Scoring Stage at Warner Bros. in Los Angeles. 30 vocalists from Synergy Vocals and 92 musicians from the Los Angeles Philharmonic Orchestra worked on the choral and orchestral pieces used in the score.

On February 12, 2020, Brandi Carlile revealed she recorded the original song "Carried Me With You" for the film's end credits, co-written with Phil and Tim Hanseroth. According to TheWrap, Carlile says, "All the way into my teenage years, having the visual to accompany certain kinds of new music was the way that I made inroads and forays into new genres of music that I wasn't being exposed to by my parents. I listened to only classic country music in my household growing up. So I would see a Disney movie or hear a Giorgio Moroder soundtrack, and I'd be like, 'Oh, my God, what is this amazing sound?' One of the most influential pieces of music in my life actually came in my preteen years when I got the 'Philadelphia' soundtrack. And I mean, on that soundtrack alone, there was Neil Young, Bruce Springsteen, Peter Gabriel, the Indigo Girls and opera. That soundtrack — to this day, I'm still chasing it down in my writing."

== Track listing ==
All music is composed by Mychael and Jeff Danna, except where noted.

No.	Title	Writer(s)	Performer	Length
1.	"Carried Me with You"	Brandi Carlile, Phil and Tim Hanseroth	Brandi Carlile	3:33
2.	"Quests of Yore"			0:52
3.	"The World Was Full of Wonder"			1:37
4.	"A Little Magic"			0:43
5.	"Bad Dragon"			1:03
6.	"New Ian"			2:36
7.	"My Mighty Steed"			0:22
8.	"My Birthday Is Cancelled"			0:44
9.	"Wish I Could Spend the Day with You"			1:46
10.	"The Visitation Spell"			3:35
11.	"The Spell"			1:06
12.	"The Spell Only Lasts One Day"			0:56
13.	"Find Another Phoenix Gem"			0:49
14.	"Going on a Quest"			0:24
15.	"Laurel in Pursuit"			0:44
16.	"The Manticore's Tavern"			0:43
17.	"Tavern Remodeling"			1:12
18.	"The Map to Raven's Point"			1:45
19.	"Two Teenage Elves"			0:38
20.	"Magnora Gantuan!"			0:32
21.	"Baby Legs"			0:41
22.	"Pixie Dusters"			1:18
23.	"The Guardian Curse"			0:42
24.	"Driving Test"			3:17
25.	"Dance Fight"			2:22
26.	"Path of Peril"			0:41
27.	"Pawn Shop"			0:28
28.	"Tracking Guinevere"			1:04
29.	"Bottomless Pit"			0:56
30.	"The Trust Bridge"			1:20
31.	"Follow Your Gut"			0:52
32.	"Running from the Cops"			1:59
33.	"Sacrifice"			0:59
34.	"Just a Beat Up Old Van"			1:36
35.	"The Cave"			0:54
36.	"Accelior!"			0:26
37.	"Boom Bastia!"			0:47
38.	"Barley's Last Memory of Dad"			0:58
39.	"Led Us to Our Victory!"			1:49
40.	"The Truth Comes Out"			0:39
41.	"Share My Life with Him"			3:24
42.	"Battling the Dragon"			3:03
43.	"Voltar Thunderseer!"			0:59
44.	"Dad"			2:52
45.	"Magic Returns"			2:48
Total length:				1:03:23

== Additional music ==
The track "Magic" by the Cars was featured in the first trailer of the film, the track "Hocus Pocus" by Focus was featured in the second trailer, and the track "Coming Home" by Sheppard was featured in the international trailer. The tracks were used for promotional purposes, and neither were featured in the soundtrack, nor in the film. Additionally, one song featured "Let's Get It On" from Marvin Gaye in the film, but is not included from the soundtrack.

== Reception ==
Alex Reif from Laughing Place reviewed "the first track is the end credit closer by Brandi Carlile, "You Carried Me With You." Her folk pop style is perfect for the film as the genre is all about generational storytelling, which is at the core of the film. The style may be incongruous with the rest of the score, but I love the song and the message within it. This is a perfect song to add to your family road trip playlist." Reif also reviewed "the rest of the soundtrack is forty-four tracks of score by Mychael Danna & Jeff Danna amounting to about an hour of solid music. Being a modern fantasy set in a world with creatures like elves, trolls, fairies, and mantacores, the score borrows musical elements from the fantasy genre. Expect to hear lutes, chimes, harpsichords, and high-pitched chorals. There are quite a few themes that play throughout the score, but the most memorable and frequently used melody tends to underscore Ian's character. It's a lighthearted, bouncy melody that can be played uplifting, like on "A Little Magic," subdued like on "New Ian," sad on "Share My Life With Him," and adventurous on "Voltar Thunderseer!"" James Southall, a review from Movie-Wave, had stated "A lot of the ingredients are here for a really fine score – there's action, adventure, fantasy and magic and at times really heartwarming emotional material, and all those components in isolation are done pretty well. It doesn't really gel together that well though – the very short tracks are an issue and every time things look like they're really getting going, they just don't. That's a shame because there is definitely music here worth hearing."

== Accolades ==
Year	Award	Category	Recipients	Result	Ref.
2020	BMI Film & TV Awards	Film Music	Mychael Danna and Jeff Danna	Won	
2021	Annie Awards	Outstanding Achievement for Music in an Animated Feature Production	Mychael Danna and Jeff Danna	Nominated	
2021	Grammy Awards	Best Song Written for Visual Media	"Carried Me with You" – Brandi Carlile, Phil Hanseroth and Tim Hanseroth	Nominated	
2021	Hollywood Music in Media Awards	Best Original Score in an Animated Film	Mychael Danna and Jeff Danna	Nominated	
2021	Hollywood Music in Media Awards	Best Original Song in an Animated Film	"Carried Me with You" – Brandi Carlile, Phil Hanseroth and Tim Hanseroth	Nominated	
2021	Hollywood Music in Media Awards	Best Soundtrack Album	Onward	Nominated	
