= The Addams Family (2019 soundtrack) =

The Addams Family (Original Motion Picture Soundtrack)

Film score by Mychael Danna and Jeff Danna
- Released: October 11, 2019
- Recorded: 2019
- Genre: Film score
- Length: 44:59
- Label: Lakeshore Records

Mychael Danna chronology
Guest of Honour (2019)	The Addams Family (2019)	Onward (2020)

Jeff Danna chronology
The Power of I (2019)	The Addams Family (2019)	Onward (2020)

The Addams Family (Original Motion Picture Soundtrack) is the score album to the 2019 film of the same name directed by Conrad Vernon and Greg Tiernan based on the characters created by Charles Addams. The film's original music is composed by Mychael Danna and Jeff Danna, released by Lakeshore Records on October 11, 2019 alongside the film. The film also featured two songs: "My Family" recorded by Migos, Karol G, Snoop Dogg, and Rock Mafia, and "Haunted Heart" by Christina Aguilera released as singles on September 13 and 27, but not in the film's soundtrack. On January 24, 2020, the soundtrack was published in double vinyl by Enjoy The Ride Records and Mondo.

== Background ==
While scoring for the film, the Danna brothers imbibed the gypsy music, from France, Spain and Eastern Europe and blended them together. The gypsy music was used to interpret the Addams' "European roots" to access the history and dark humour of the family when they migrate to America. The combination of gyspy instrumentation and orchestral music, gave them "a tremendously colorful and lively pallette". Some of the instrumentation includes using Wurlitzer pipe, gothic organ and musical saw, that gives a "whimsical and gothic sounding". The duo also included Vic Mizzy's titular theme song from the 1964 television series into few bits in the film's score.

The titular track "Welcome to the Addams Family" was released as a single on October 4, 2019, along with the soundtrack's pre-order. Another single titled "Give My Creatures Life!" was released as a single on October 10, while the following day, the album was released in conjunction with the film.

In addition to the original score, the film also featured two songs. Migos, Karol G, Snoop Dogg, and Rock Mafia recorded the song "My Family" which was released as a single on September 13, 2019 by MGM Records. Christina Aguilera recorded the song "Haunted Heart" that was released as a September 27, 2019 by RCA Records. These two songs were however not featured in the soundtrack.

== Track listing ==
No.	Title	Length
1.	"Welcome To the Addams Family"	1:19
2.	"It's Creepy, It's Kooky"	0:58
3.	"Unhappy Darling?"	1:16
4.	"I Now Pronounce You Monsters"	1:39
5.	"Lurch On the Loose"	0:38
6.	"Make Yourself At Home"	0:35
7.	"What a Lovely Morning"	1:58
8.	"Wednesday's Wish"	0:59
9.	"Let the Games Begin"	1:24
10.	"Uncle Fester Arrives"	1:36
11.	"What Is Beyond the Gate?"	0:45
12.	"Margaux's Here To Help"	0:26
13.	"Assimilation!"	0:39
14.	"Balloon"	0:31
15.	"Opposite of Sad"	1:21
16.	"The Addams Visit Eastfield"	0:23
17.	"Wednesday and Parker"	1:45
18.	"An Army of Freaks"	1:10
19.	"Scented Embalming Fluid"	1:10
20.	"Eastfield Junior High"	0:24
21.	"Margaux Inflames the Townsfolk"	1:10
22.	"Give My Creatures Life!"	1:58
23.	"Gramma Brings Gifts"	1:27
24.	"Wednesday's Room"	0:57
25.	"Tea and Seance"	1:15
26.	"Pugsley Has Two Left Feet"	0:49
27.	"Wednesday Leaves Home"	1:50
28.	"Mommy's Crafting Room"	1:30
29.	"A Town Overrun"	1:01
30.	"An Addams Family Reunion"	0:52
31.	"Addams' Aren't Wanted Here"	1:16
32.	"The Hour Is Upon Us"	0:55
33.	"Mazurka Fail!"	1:03
34.	"Wednesday Crashes the Party"	0:59
35.	"Margaux Attacks"	1:07
36.	"If They're Freaks, Then So Are All of You"	1:08
37.	"My Little Raven"	1:10
38.	"Give Us a Chance To Make It Right"	1:04
39.	"Pugsley Coronation"	1:05
40.	"Get Out!"	0:35
41.	"Addams Family Theme" (performed by HeathisHuman)	0:52
Total length:		44:59

== Reception ==
Filmtracks.com wrote "The gypsy and folk instrumentation is mildly obnoxious, and although the album does include the Mizzy song adaptation heard over the end credits, it is missing other notable songs heard on screen. It's a solid souvenir from this film, but seek out Shaiman's music from the live-action entries for a better concept listening experience."

== Accolades ==
Mychael and Jeff won the BMI Film & TV Awards in 2020, and also won two SOCAN Awards for Achievement in Feature Film Music and International Film Music Award in 2022. The track "Haunted Heart" received a nomination for the Best Original Song in an Animated Film at the 2019 Hollywood Music in Media Awards lost to "Beautiful Life" from Abominable (2019).

== Release history ==
Release dates and formats for The Addams Family (Original Motion Picture Soundtrack)
Region	Date	Format(s)	Label	Ref.
Various	October 11, 2019	CD; digital download; streaming	Lakeshore	
Various	January 24, 2020	Vinyl	Enjoy the Ride Records; Mondo	

== Personnel ==
Credits adapted from CD liner notes.

- Music – Mychael Danna, Jeff Danna
- Additional music – Jessica Weiss, Nicholas Skalba
- Mixing – John Whynot
- Mastering – Justin Fleuriel, Stephen Marsh
- Score editor – Erich Stratmann
- Technician – Jamie Olivera
- Score coordinator – Shirley Song
- Music preparation – JoAnne Kane Music Service
- Scoring crew – Richard Wheeler Jr., Ryan Robinson
- Executive producer – Brian McNelis, Darren Blumenthal, Tara Finegan
- Art direction – John Bergin
- A&R – Eric Craig

Instruments

- Accordion – Nick Ariondo
- Bass – Drew Dembowski, Ian Walker, Mike Valerio, Ed Meares
- Bassoon – Anthony Parnther, Rose Corrigan
- Cello – Cecilia Tsan, Charlie Tyler, Eric Byers, Jacob Braun, Mike Kaufman, Tim Loo, Vanessa Freebairn-Smith, Steve Erdody
- Clarinet – Don Foster, Stuart Clark
- Drums – Russ Miller
- Flute – Johanna Borenstein, Heather Clark
- French horn – Dan Kelley, Jenny Kim, Katie Faraudo, Mark Adams, Teag Reaves, Dylan Hart
- Harp – Katie Kirkpatrick
- Oboe – Lara Wickes, Leslie Reed
- Organ – Aaron Shows
- Recording assistance – Dimitri Smith, Harry Risoleo, Kyle Rodriguez
- Percussion – Bob Zimmitti, Brian Kilgore, Pete Korpela
- Piano – Mychael Danna
- Santoor – Hamid Saeidi
- Saw – Janeen Rae Heller
- Saxophones, woodwinds – George Shelby, Brian Scanlon, Dan Higgins, Greg Huckins, Jay Mason, Mike Nelson
- Tambura, bandurria, cuatro, tipple, cittern, ukulele, bouzouki, guitar – Jeff Danna
- Timpani – Wade Culbreath
- Trombone – Bill Reichenbach, Steve Holtman, Alex Iles
- Trumpet – Barry Perkins, Dan Fornero, Dusty McKinney, Rob Schaer, Jon Lewis, Wayne Bergeron
- Tuba – Doug Tornquist
- Viola – Alma Fernandez, Luke Maurer, Rob Brophy, Shawn Mann
- Violin – Alyssa Park, Andrew Bulbrook, Ben Jacobson, Charlie Bisharat, Jackie Brand, Jessica Guideri, Josefina Vergara, Lucia Micarelli, Marisa Kuney, Mark Robertson, Natalie Leggett, Neel Hammond, Sara Parkins, Shalini Vijayan, Songa Lee, Tammy Hatwan, Roger Wilkie
- Woodwind – Sandro Friedrich

Orchestra

- Assistant orchestration – Brooks Ball
- Orchestration, conductor – Nicholas Dodd
- Contractor – Gina Zimmitti
- Assistant contractor – Whitney Martin
- Administrative coordinator – Don Smith, Erica Pope
- Concertmaster – Bruce Dukov

Soloists and vocals

- Bass – Dave Stone
- Fiddle – Fabrice Martinez
- Percussion – Quinn
- Violin – Mark Robertson
- Soprano vocals – Holly Sedillos
