= Colin O'Donoghue =

Irish actor (born 1981)

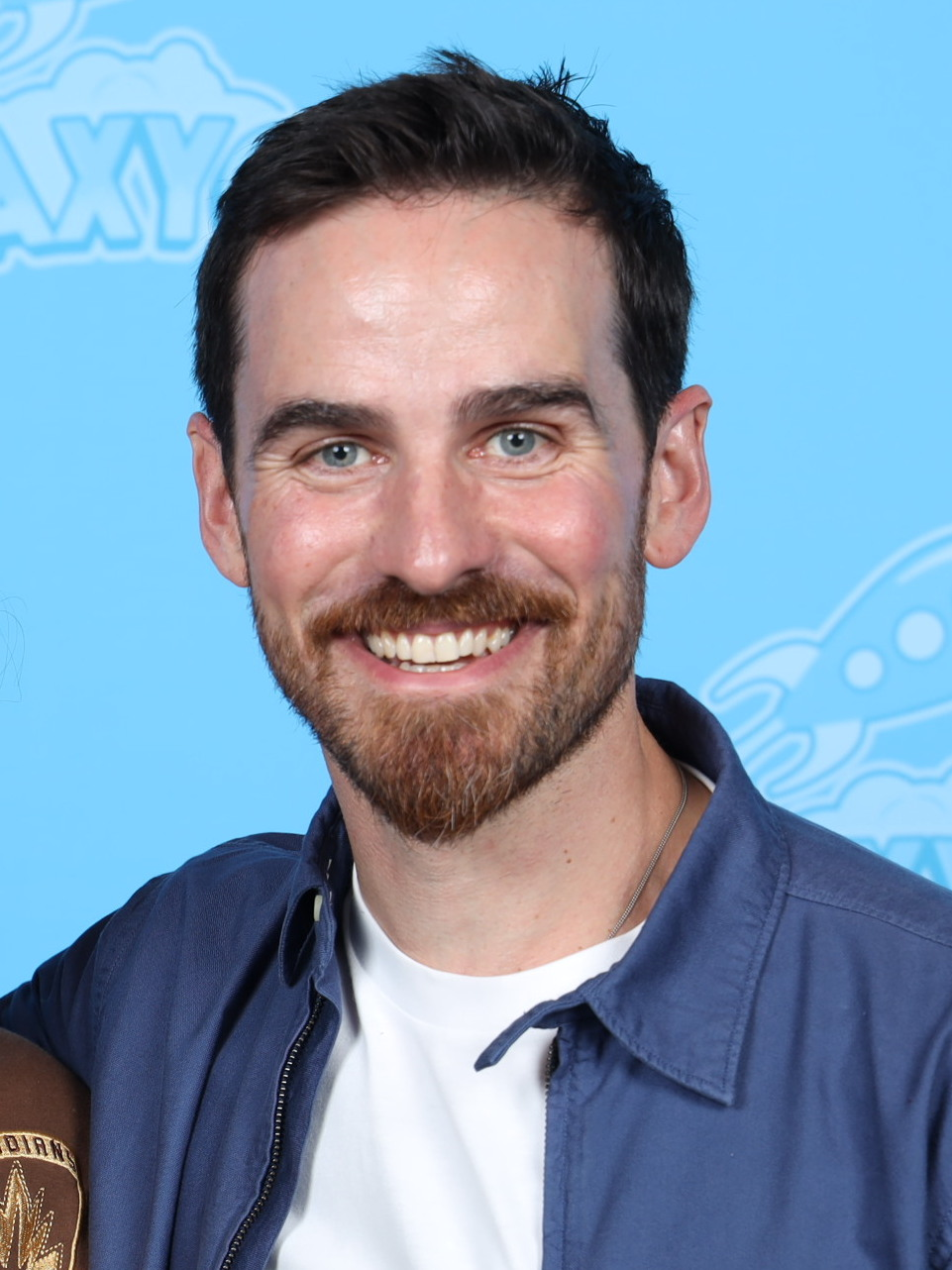
- O'Donoghue in 2023 at Galaxy Con Raleigh
- Born: Colin Arthur O'Donoghue; 26 January 1981 (age 45); Drogheda, County Louth, Ireland
- Education: Gaiety School of Acting
- Occupations: Actor; musician
- Years active: 2001–present
- Height: 178 cm (5 ft 10 in)
- Spouse: Helen O'Donoghue (m. 2009)
- Children: 2
- Relatives: Harry O'Donoghue (cousin)

Colin O'Donoghue (born 26 January 1981) is an Irish actor and musician, best known for portraying Captain Killian "Hook" Jones on the ABC TV show Once Upon a Time. He appeared in the horror thriller film The Rite (2011) as a skeptical novice priest, Michael Kovak. He portrayed the character of Douxie Casperan in the Guillermo del Toro animated series Tales of Arcadia for Netflix. He is also portraying Gordon Cooper on Disney+ Original Series The Right Stuff. He starred in Dolly Parton's Heartstrings as J.J. Sneed.

== Early life and education ==
Colin O'Donoghue, the son of Con and Mary O'Donoghue, was born and raised in Drogheda, County Louth, in a Roman Catholic family. He has an older brother named Allen. He is the cousin of musician Harry O'Donoghue. He attended Dundalk Grammar School, and later The Gaiety School of Acting in Dublin. At age 16, he went to Paris for a month to learn French.

== Career ==
O'Donoghue's early career was mainly split between theatre and television work in Ireland and the UK. In 2003, he won the Irish Film and Television Award for "Best New Talent" for his role as Norman in "Home For Christmas".

In 2009, he appeared as Duke Philip of Bavaria in an episode of season 3 of the Showtime historical-fiction series The Tudors. He made his Hollywood film debut alongside Anthony Hopkins in the horror thriller film The Rite (2011). He made an audition video for The Rite in a friend's home studio in Drogheda and sent it to the United States. He plays guitar and sings in a band called The Enemies, formed in 2003 in Ireland.

In 2012, O'Donoghue was cast as Captain Hook/Killian Jones, love interest of the main heroine Emma Swan, in the second season of the hit ABC series Once Upon a Time. In 2014, O'Donoghue was cast as the main character in The Dust Storm, an independent film set in Nashville, Tennessee as a musician named Brennan.

Christina Perri wrote a song, "The Words", which she dedicated to Colin's character (Captain Hook) in Once Upon a Time.

In December 2018, O'Donoghue was cast in an episode of the Netflix anthology drama series, Heartstrings. The series premiered on 22 November 2019.

=== The Enemies ===
O'Donoghue was part of the five-piece Irish band, "The Enemies", which was formed in 2003 by O'Donoghue and a close friend, Ronan McQuillan. The Enemies released their self-titled debut EP on 7 March 2011 prior to their self-funded first album on track. He played guitar and sang backing vocals on the band's first EP and debut album.

Although the band was unsigned, it was commissioned by General Motors to record tracks for their "Chevy route 66" online campaign. The band worked on the music for Coca-Cola's "5BY20" project. Their debut album Sounds Big on the Radio was to be released in March 2013, which was later scheduled for 2014. In May 2013, he announced he was leaving the band due to the filming schedule of Once Upon a Time.

=== Awards ===
For his role in Home for Christmas, he was awarded Best New Talent at the 1st Irish Film & Television Awards, held on 1 November 2003.

=== Podcast host ===
O'Donoghue has been the co-host of The Sync Report podcast since 2022, his first episode airing in February 2022 and featuring Steve Vai as guest. His fellow co-hosts are American film producer Rose Ganguzza and music supervisor Jason P. Rothberg.

== Personal life ==
O'Donoghue married his wife Helen, a schoolteacher, in 2009, shortly after his appearance on The Tudors. The couple have been together since they were eighteen and have two children: a son and a daughter.

== Filmography ==
=== Film ===
Year	Title	Role	Notes
2003	Call Girl	Brendan	Short film
2006	24/7	Nick	Short film
2009	The Euthanizer	Ben	Short film
2011	The Rite	Michael Kovak	
2012	Storage 24	Mark	
2016	The Dust Storm	Brennan	
2016	Carrie Pilby	Professor David Harrison	
2018	What Still Remains	Peter	
2021	Trollhunters: Rise of the Titans	Douxie (voice)	
2022	Luck	Gerry (voice)	
2026	Catch The Wind	Shane O'Driscoll	

=== Television ===
Year	Title	Role	Notes
2001	Rebel Heart	Rowe	Miniseries; episode 1
2002	Home for Christmas	Norman Quested	Television film Irish Film & Television Award for Best New Talent
2004	Love Is the Drug	Peter	2 episodes
2005	Proof	Jamie	2 episodes
2005	Fair City	Emmet Fitzgerald	3 episodes
2006	The Clinic	Conor Elliott	11 episodes
2009	The Tudors	Duke Philip of Bavaria	Episode: "The Undoing of Cromwell"
2009	Wild Decembers	Young guard	Television film
2011	Identity	John Bloom	Television pilot
2012	Once Upon a Time	Captain Hook/Killian Jones	Main role (season 2–6); Guest role (season 7)
2012	Once Upon a Time	Wish Hook/Rogers	Guest role (season 6); Main role (season 7)
2018	Trollhunters	Douxie (voice)	3 episodes
2019	3Below: Tales of Arcadia	Douxie (voice)	2 episodes
2019	Dolly Parton's Heartstrings	JJ Sneed	Episode: "JJ Sneed"
2020	The Right Stuff	Gordon Cooper	Main role
2020	Wizards: Tales of Arcadia	Douxie (voice)	Main role
2022	The Great North	Dr. Callahan (voice)	2 episodes
2026	The Gray House	Captain William Lounsbury	5 episodes
TBA	Robin Hood	Prince Richard	Season 2 cast

=== Video games ===
Year	Title	Role	Source
2020	Trollhunters: Defenders of Arcadia	Douxie (voice)	

=== Music videos ===
Year	Title	Artist(s)	Role	Source
2015	"The Words"	Christina Perri	Love interest	

== Theatre ==
Year	Title	Role	Theatre	Location
	Aoife and Isobel		Project Theatre	Dublin, Ireland
	The Dream of a Summer Day		Storytellers Theatre Company	Dublin, Ireland
	Eclipse		Olivier Theatre	London, England
	Eugene Onegin – The Roadshow		Something Different Theatre Company	Oxford, England
	Leaving		Quarehawks Theatre Company	Monaghan, Ireland
	Moonlight Mickey's		Calipo Theatre Company	Drogheda, Ireland
	Othello		Second Age Theatre Company	Dublin, Ireland
	Outlying Islands		Island Theatre Company	Chicago, US
	Sky Road		Theatre Royal Waterford	Waterford, Ireland
	The Taming Of The Shrew		Rough Magic	Dublin, Ireland
	Walking the Road		Axis Theatre	Vancouver, Canada
	What the Dead Want		Project Theatre	Dublin, Ireland
2024	2:22 A Ghost Story	Sam	3Olympia Theatre	Dublin, Ireland

== Awards and nominations ==
Year	Group	Award	Result	Notes
2003	Irish Film and Television Awards	Best New Talent	Won	Home for Christmas
2014	People's Choice Awards	Favorite On-Screen Chemistry shared with: Jennifer Morrison	Nominated	Once Upon a Time
2015	Teen Choice Awards	Choice TV Liplock shared with: Jennifer Morrison	Nominated	Once Upon a Time
2016	Teen Choice Awards	Choice TV Liplock shared with: Jennifer Morrison	Won	Once Upon a Time
2017	Teen Choice Awards	Choice TV Liplock shared with: Jennifer Morrison	Nominated	Once Upon a Time
2017	Teen Choice Awards	Choice Scene Stealer	Nominated	Once Upon a Time

== See also ==
- List of Irish people
