= Tales of Arcadia =

Fantasy trilogy written by Guillermo del Toro

- Created by: Guillermo del Toro
- Original work: Trollhunters (2015 novel)
- Owner: Netflix / DreamWorks Animation (Universal Pictures)
- Years: 2015–2021

Print publications
- Novel(s): Trollhunters (2015); A Brief Recapitulation of Troll Lore: Volume 48 (2017); Trollhunters: The Adventure Begins (2017); Trollhunters: Welcome to the Darklands (2017); Jim Lake Jr.'s Survival Guide (2017); Trollhunters: The Book of Ga-Huel (2018); Trollhunters: Age of the Amulet (2018); Trollhunters: The Way of the Wizard (2018); Trollhunters: Angor Reborn (2018); 3Below: Arcadia-Con (2019)
- Comics: Trollhunters: The Secret History of Trollkind (2018); Trollhunters: The Felled (2018); The Art of Trollhunters (2019)

Films and television
- Film(s): Trollhunters: Rise of the Titans (2021)
- Animated series: Trollhunters: Tales of Arcadia (2016–2018); 3Below: Tales of Arcadia (2018–2019); Wizards: Tales of Arcadia (2020)

Games
- Video game(s): Trollhunters: Defenders of Arcadia (2020)

Official website
- https://dreamworks.com/shows/trollhunters

Tales of Arcadia is a trilogy of animated science fantasy television series created for Netflix by Guillermo del Toro and produced by DreamWorks Animation and Double Dare You. The series comprising the trilogy follows the inhabitants of the small suburban town of Arcadia Oaks, which is secretly home to various supernatural creatures and the young heroes who fight against the forces of evil that lurk in the shadows.

The three installments of the trilogy are: Trollhunters, 3Below, and Wizards, with the feature film Rise of the Titans, added as a capstone; all have been released worldwide.

Since its release, the franchise has been widely praised as an ambitious and boundary-pushing animated series, with Filmink's Travis Johnson calling it "the best children's animation to come along since Avatar: The Last Airbender." Trollhunters was nominated for nine Daytime Emmy Awards in 2017, winning more than any other animated or live-action television program that year, and the trilogy has been twice nominated for the Emmy for Outstanding Children's Animated Series. It has also received or been nominated for a BAFTA Award, several Annie Awards, Golden Reel Awards, a Saturn Award, and twice won the Kidscreen Award of "Best New Series" for the first and final chapters, Trollhunters and Wizards. The franchise has been critically acclaimed for its high-quality CGI animation, its dark emotional and mature tone and complex writing, voice acting, representation of Latin Americans and immigrants, themes of prejudice, music, humor, and characters.

The show has also spawned several original children's books and has been adapted into a series of graphic novels by Marc Guggenheim and Richard Hamilton released by Dark Horse, and a video game titled Trollhunters: Defenders of Arcadia, released on PlayStation 4, Xbox One, Nintendo Switch and Microsoft Windows.

In August 2020, it was announced the trilogy would be concluded with a full-length feature film titled Trollhunters: Rise of the Titans, which was released to Netflix on July 21, 2021.

== Production ==
Guillermo del Toro initially envisioned the idea of Trollhunters as a live-action television series. However, this was deemed impractical due to budgetary concerns of using computer generated monsters as main cast members in a live-action production, and as a result he instead turned the idea into a book he co-wrote alongside Daniel Kraus and published by Disney-Hyperion. DreamWorks Animation then optioned the book to develop as an animated feature film set to be directed by Pixar veteran Rodrigo Blaas, who stayed on as executive producer and supervising director when Netflix greenlit the project as a CGI-animated television series. Marc Guggenheim was hired to pen the original screenplay for the film version, and went on to write the pilot for Trollhunters. Dan and Kevin Hageman were brought on as co-executive producers for the series, with Aaron Waltke, AC Bradley, and Chad Quandt joining the writers' room.

Production on the series and its subsequent sequels began in early 2014 and continued until the end of the franchise in 2021. The project attracted an all-star cast, including the voices of Anton Yelchin, Emile Hirsch, Mark Hamill, Kelsey Grammer, Ron Perlman, Glenn Close, Lena Headey, Steven Yeun, Anjelica Huston, Diego Luna, Nick Offerman, Tatiana Maslany, Nick Frost, Stephanie Beatriz, Alfred Molina, David Bradley, Colin O'Donoghue, John Rhys-Davies, and more throughout its six-year run.

In November 2017, del Toro announced that Trollhunters would be expanded into a trilogy of interconnected animated series under the name Tales of Arcadia. The two sequel series set to continue the story would be entitled 3Below and Wizards, and would explore the secret worlds of extraterrestrials and wizards hidden in the same fictional town of Trollhunters.

In April 2018, it was announced that despite the sudden passing of lead actor Anton Yelchin, the role of Jim Lake Jr. would incorporate both the voices of Yelchin and Emile Hirsch for the entirety of Part 3 of Trollhunters and future iterations of the series. Two characters introduced in the final season of Trollhunters—Aja and Krel (voiced by Tatiana Maslany and Diego Luna, respectively)—also reprised their roles and serve as the leads in 3Below. In May 2018, it was revealed that Steve Palchuk would also have his role extended into Wizards as well, making him and Toby Domzalski (voiced by Charlie Saxton) the first characters to encompass the entire trilogy. On July 7, 2020, it was revealed that the character of Douxie Casperan (voiced by Colin O'Donoghue) and his familiar Archie (voiced by Alfred Molina) would be introduced as the final main characters of Wizards: Tales of Arcadia, rounding out the ensemble cast.

In 2017, Marc Guggenheim and Rodrigo Blaas continued their role as showrunners and executive producers for 3Below, with A.C. Bradley serving as story editor and head writer until her departure to work on What If...?.

In 2018, Aaron Waltke and Chad Quandt returned as co-executive producers and co-showrunners with Marc Guggenheim for Wizards: Tales of Arcadia, before departing to write and produce the forthcoming television series, Star Trek: Prodigy.

Dan and Kevin Hageman and Marc Guggenheim wrote the screenplay for the finale film, Trollhunters: Rise of the Titans, released on July 21, 2021.

== Synopsis ==
=== Setting ===
Tales of Arcadia follows the inhabitants of the small suburban town of Arcadia Oaks (a fictionalized version of Arcadia, California), which is secretly home to various supernatural creatures and the young heroes who fight against the forces of evil that lurk in the shadows.

=== Premise ===
In Trollhunters, a high school student named James Lake Jr becomes the first human to be a Trollhunter, carrying the duty of protecting both the trolls living in a secret realm known as Trollmarket and humans living in the surface world from an invasion of flesh-eating trolls known as Gumm-Gumms led by the vicious warlord, Gunmar the Skullcrusher.

In 3Below, two royal siblings named Princess Aja and Crown Prince Krel Tarron, who live on the alien planet Akiridion-5, must escape to Earth when their home is taken over by an evil general named Val Morando.

In Wizards, a sorcerer-in-training named Douxie Casperan must embark on a time-bending adventure to medieval Camelot in a battle with the Arcane Order to save the future of Arcadia Oaks and the world at large.

Finally, in Trollhunters: Rise of the Titans, all of the Guardians of Arcadia unite when the world is on the brink of an apocalyptic battle for the control of magic that will determine the fate of these supernatural worlds that have now converged as the Arcane Order reawakens the Titans.

== Overview ==
| Series | Season | Episodes | Originally released | Showrunner(s) |
|---|---|---|---|---|
| Trollhunters: Tales of Arcadia | 1 | 26 | December 23, 2016 | Guillermo del Toro, Marc Guggenheim, and Dan and Kevin Hageman |
| Trollhunters: Tales of Arcadia | 2 | 13 | December 15, 2017 | Guillermo del Toro, Marc Guggenheim, and Dan and Kevin Hageman |
| Trollhunters: Tales of Arcadia | 3 | 13 | May 25, 2018 | Guillermo del Toro, Marc Guggenheim, and Dan and Kevin Hageman |
| 3Below: Tales of Arcadia | 1 | 13 | December 21, 2018 | Guillermo del Toro and Marc Guggenheim |
| 3Below: Tales of Arcadia | 2 | 13 | July 12, 2019 | Guillermo del Toro and Marc Guggenheim |
| Wizards: Tales of Arcadia | 1 | 10 | August 7, 2020 | Guillermo del Toro, Marc Guggenheim, Aaron Waltke, and Chad Quandt |
| Trollhunters: Rise of the Titans | Film | | July 21, 2021 | Directed by : Johane Matte, Francisco Ruiz Velasco, Andrew Schmidt; Story by : Guillermo del Toro, Marc Guggenheim, Dan and Kevin Hageman |

== Other media ==
=== Comics ===
- Trollhunters: The Secret History of Trollkind (2018)
- Trollhunters: The Felled (2018)

=== Novels ===
- Trollhunters: The Adventure Begins (2017)
- Trollhunters: Welcome to the Darklands (2017)
- Trollhunters: The Book of Ga-Huel (2018)
- Trollhunters: Age of the Amulet (2018)
- Trollhunters: The Way of the Wizard (2018)
- Trollhunters: Angor Reborn (2018)

=== Books ===
- Trollhunters: A Brief Recapitulation of Troll Lore: Volume 48 (2017)
- Jim Lake Jr.'s Survival Guide (2017)
- Trollhunters: The Art of Trollhunters (2019)

=== Video game ===
Trollhunters: Defenders of Arcadia is a video game based on Trollhunters. It was released for PlayStation 4, Xbox One, Nintendo Switch and PC on September 25, 2020.

== Accolades ==
| Year | Award | Category | Nominee(s) | Result |
|---|---|---|---|---|
| 2017 | Annie Awards | Outstanding Achievement, Character Animation in an Animated Television/Broadcast Production | Mike Chaffe for character Blinky in "Becoming, Part 1" | Won |
| 2017 | Annie Awards | Outstanding Achievement, Character Design in an Animated TV/Broadcast Production | Victor Maldonado, Alfredo Torres and Jules Rigolle, "Win, Lose or Draal" | Won |
| 2017 | Annie Awards | Outstanding Achievement, Music in an Animated TV/Broadcast Production | Alexandre Desplat and Tim Davies, "Becoming, Part 1" | Nominated |
| 2017 | Annie Awards | Outstanding Achievement, Storyboarding in an Animated TV/Broadcast Production | Hyunjoo Song, "Win, Lose or Draal" | Won |
| 2017 | Saturn Awards | Best Animated Series or Film on Television | Trollhunters | Nominated |
| 2017 | Behind the Voice Actors Awards | Best Male Lead Vocal Performance in a Television Series | Anton Yelchin, for Jim Lake Jr. | Won |
| 2017 | Behind the Voice Actors Awards | Best Female Lead Vocal Performance in a Television Series | Lexi Medrano, for Claire Nuñez | Nominated |
| 2017 | Behind the Voice Actors Awards | Best Female Vocal Performance in a Television Series in a Supporting Role | Laraine Newman, for Miss Janeth | Nominated |
| 2017 | Behind the Voice Actors Awards | Best Female Vocal Performance in a Television Series in a Guest Role | Anjelica Huston, for Queen Usurna | Nominated |
| 2017 | Daytime Emmy Awards | Outstanding Individual Achievement in Character Animation | Mike Chaffe, "Becoming, Part 1" | Won |
| 2017 | Daytime Emmy Awards | Outstanding Individual Achievement in Character Design | Victor Maldonado, "Win, Lose Or Draal" | Won |
| 2017 | Daytime Emmy Awards | Outstanding Special Class Animated Program | Guillermo del Toro, Rodrigo Blaas, Marc Guggenheim, Chad Hammes, Christina Steinberg, Dan Hageman, Kevin Hageman, Lawrence Jonas | Nominated |
| 2017 | Daytime Emmy Awards | Outstanding Performer in an Animated Program | Kelsey Grammer, for Blinky | Won |
| 2017 | Daytime Emmy Awards | Outstanding Casting for an Animated Series or Special | Mary Hidalgo, Ania O'Hare, CSA | Won |
| 2017 | Daytime Emmy Awards | Outstanding Writing in an Animated Program | Marc Guggenheim | Won |
| 2017 | Daytime Emmy Awards | Outstanding Directing in an Animated Program | Rodrigo Blaas, Guillermo del Toro | Won |
| 2017 | Daytime Emmy Awards | Outstanding Main Title and Graphic Design | Rodrigo Blaas, Andy Erekson, Jonathan Catalan, Dai Weier, John Laus, David M.V. Jones | Nominated |
| 2017 | Daytime Emmy Awards | Outstanding Sound Mixing – Animation | Matthew Thomas Hall and Carlos Sanches, CAS | Nominated |
| 2018 | Annie Awards | Outstanding Achievement, Character Animation in an Animated Television/Broadcast Production | Bruno Chiou, Yi-Fan Cho, Kevin Jong, Chun-Jung Chu, "Homecoming" | Won |
| 2018 | Annie Awards | Outstanding Achievement, Character Design in an Animated Television/Broadcast Production | Jules Rigolle, Alfredo Torres, Linda Chen, Rustam Hasanov, Alfonso Blaas, "Escape from the Darklands" | Nominated |
| 2018 | Annie Awards | Outstanding Achievement, Directing in an Animated Television/Broadcast Production | Andrew Schmidt, "Unbecoming" | Nominated |
| 2018 | Annie Awards | Outstanding Achievement, Storyboarding in an Animated Television/Broadcast Production | David Woo, "Hero with a Thousand Faces" | Nominated |
| 2018 | Annie Awards | Outstanding Achievement, Storyboarding in an Animated Television/Broadcast Production | Hyunjoo Song, "In the Hall of the Gumm-Gumm King" | Nominated |
| 2018 | Annie Awards | Outstanding Achievement, Writing in an Animated Television/Broadcast Production | A.C. Bradley, Kevin Hageman, Dan Hageman, Aaron Waltke, Chad Quandt, "Escape from the Darklands" | Nominated |
| 2018 | Kidscreen Awards | Best New Series, Kids Category | Trollhunters | Won |
| 2018 | Kidscreen Awards | Best Writing | Trollhunters | Won |
| 2018 | Kidscreen Awards | Best Animation | Trollhunters | Won |
| 2018 | Golden Reel Award | Outstanding Achievement in Sound Editing, Animation Short Form | Matthew Hall, Jason Oliver, Goeun Lee, MPSE, James Miller, Carlos Sanches, Aran Tanchum, Vincent Guisetti | Nominated |
| 2018 | Daytime Emmy Awards | Outstanding Children's Animated Series | Guillermo del Toro, Marc Guggenheim, Chad Hammes, Rodrigo Blaas, Christina Steinberg, Dan Hageman, Kevin Hageman, Lawrence Jonas | Nominated |
| 2018 | Daytime Emmy Awards | Outstanding Writing in an Animated Program | Dan Hageman, Kevin Hageman, Aaron Waltke, Chad Quandt, AC Bradley | Won |
| 2018 | Daytime Emmy Awards | Outstanding Sound Editing – Animation | Matt Hall, Goeun Lee, James Miller, James Oliver, Aran Tanchum, Stacey Michaels, Vincent Guilsetti, Alex Ulrich | Nominated |
| 2018 | Daytime Emmy Awards | Outstanding Main Title and Graphic Design | Rodrigo Blaas, Andy Erekson, Jonathan Catalan, Dai Weier, David M.V. Jones, John Laus | Nominated |
| 2018 | BAFTA | International Animation | Rodrigo Blaas, Marc Guggenheim, Chad Hammes | Nominated |
| 2019 | Annie Awards | Best Animated Television/Broadcast Production For Children | "Trollhunters: Tales of Arcadia" | Nominated |
| 2019 | Annie Awards | Animated Effects in an Animated Production | "Trollhunters: Tales of Arcadia" | Won |
| 2019 | Daytime Emmy Awards | Outstanding Writing for an Animated Program | Marc Guggenheim, Dan Hageman, Kevin Hageman, AC Bradley, Chad Quandt, Lila Scott and Aaron Waltke | Nominated |
| 2019 | Daytime Emmy Awards | Outstanding Directing for an Animated Program | Rodrigo Blaas, Elaine Bogan, Guillermo del Toro, Johane Matte, Andrew Schmidt | Nominated |
| 2019 | Daytime Emmy Awards | Outstanding Sound Mixing for an Animated Program | Carlos Sanches | Nominated |
| 2019 | Daytime Emmy Awards | Outstanding Sound Editing for an Animated Program | Matt Hall, Otis Van Osten, Jason Oliver, Aran Tanchum, Vincent Guisetti | Nominated |
| 2020 | Annie Awards | Outstanding Achievement for Animated Effects in an Animated Television/Broadcast Production | Greg Lev, Igor Lodeiro, Chen Ling, Brandon Tyra | Nominated |
| 2020 | Annie Awards | Best Animated Television/Broadcast Production for Children | Guillermo del Toro, Rodrigo Blaas, Chad Hammes, Marc Guggenheim | Nominated |
| 2020 | Golden Reel Awards | Outstanding Achievement in Sound Editing - Animation Short Form | Supervising Sound Editor: Otis Van Osten, Foley Editor: Tommy Sarioglou, Dialogue Editors: Carlos Sanches, Jason Oliver, Foley Artist: Aran Tanchum, Vincent Guisetti, "3Below: Tales of Arcadia" | Won |
| 2020 | Daytime Emmy Awards | Outstanding Sound Editing for an Animated Program | Otis Van Osten, Jason Oliver, Carlos Sanchez, Tommy Sarioglou, Aran Tanchum, Vincent Guisetti, James Miller | Nominated |
| 2021 | Kidscreen Awards | Best New Series | Guillermo del Toro, Marc Guggenheim, Aaron Waltke, Chad Quandt, Chad Hammes. "Wizards: Tales of Arcadia" | Won |
| 2021 | Golden Reel Awards | Outstanding Achievement in Sound Editing - Animation Short Form | Supervising Sound Editors: James Miller, Otis Van Osten Foley Editor: Tommy Sarioglou, Aran Tanchum Dialogue Editors: Carlos Sanches, Jason Oliver Foley Artist: Vincent Guisetti, "Spellbound" | Nominated |
| 2021 | Annie Awards | Best Voice Acting, TV/Media | David Bradley for the character of Merlin, "Wizards: Tales of Arcadia", Episode: "Our Final Act" | Won |
| 2021 | Annie Awards | Best FX for TV/Media | "Wizards: Tales of Arcadia", Episode: "Killahead, Part Two", DreamWorks Animation; Greg Lev, Igor Lodeiro, Brandon Tyra, Cui Wei, Ma Xiao | Nominated |
| 2021 | Daytime Emmy Awards | Outstanding Children's Animated Series | Guillermo del Toro, Marc Guggenheim, Chad Hammes, Chad Quandt, Aaron Waltke, Lauren Prince | Nominated |
| 2021 | Daytime Emmy Awards | Outstanding Main Title for a Daytime Animated Program | Francisco Ruiz Velasco, Alfonso Blaas, Yingjue Linda Chen, Brandon Tyra, Greg Lev, Igor Lodeiro, Jonatan Catalan Navarrete | Won |
| 2021 | Daytime Emmy Awards | Outstanding Editing for a Daytime Animated Program | John Laus, Jay Fox, Andrew Ramstedt | Nominated |
| 2021 | Daytime Emmy Awards | Outstanding Sound Mixing and Sound Editing for an Animated Program | Otis Van Osten, Carlos Sanches, James Miller, Jason Oliver, Vincent Guisetti, Aran Tanchum | Nominated |
| 2022 | Annie Awards | Best FX - TV/Media | Greg Lev, Brandon Tyra, Prakash Dcunha, Vincent Chou, Chen Ling | Nominated |
| 2022 | Annie Awards | Best Voice Acting - TV/Media | Charlie Saxton as the voice of Toby Domzalski | Nominated |
| 2022 | Children's and Family Emmy Awards | Outstanding Special Class Animated Program | Trollhunters: Rise of the Titans | Nominated |
| 2022 | Children's and Family Emmy Awards | Outstanding Sound Editing and Sound Mixing for an Animated Program | Trollhunters: Rise of the Titans | Nominated |

== Future ==
Following the release of Trollhunters: Rise of the Titans, writer Marc Guggenheim said the film is meant to "wrap up the trilogy and for this really to be the final chapter in the story", but that it simultaneously "also opens the door for a whole host of new storytelling possibilities", and that it was "designed to be a cap, and [he suspects] it will remain that way for at least a little bit".
