= Haunted Heart (Christina Aguilera song) =

Single by Christina Aguilera
- Released: September 27, 2019
- Genre: Pop; soul; jazz
- Length: 2:46
- Label: RCA
- Songwriters: Antonina Armato; Christina Aguilera; Tim James
- Producer: Rock Mafia

Christina Aguilera singles chronology
"Like I Do" (2018)	"Haunted Heart" (2019)	"Fall on Me" (2019)

Music video
- "Haunted Heart" on YouTube

"Haunted Heart" is a song recorded by American singer Christina Aguilera. The song was written by Aguilera, Antonina Armato and Tim James, and produced by the latter two (comprising the duo Rock Mafia). It was released as a single on September 27, 2019, by RCA Records for the 2019 animated film The Addams Family.

A fusion of pop, jazz and soul, the song tells the story of a passionate romantic relationship. It is a retro-style recording, reminiscent of songs from Aguilera's Back to Basics album, and dedicated to a gothic icon — Morticia Addams. "Haunted Heart" was praised by music critics, who complimented its production and Aguilera's soulful vocal delivery, and it also received a nomination for the Hollywood Music in Media Award for Best Original Song in an Animated Film.

== Background and release ==
On September 10, 2019, it was announced that Christina Aguilera, Snoop Dogg, and Migos would be featured on the soundtrack for the animated film The Addams Family. Jonathan Glickman, MGM's Motion Picture Group President, said that: "Christina Aguilera, Migos, (...) and Snoop Dogg are all powerhouse talents. We could not have asked for a better lineup of global superstars to help audiences embrace the weird and celebrate the absurd with two brand-new songs that perfectly compliment this fresh fun take on MGM's beloved franchise, just in time for Halloween."

The soundtrack for MGM's The Addams Family was promoted by two singles; the first of them was "My Family" performed by Migos, Karol G, Rock Mafia, and Snoop Dogg. "Haunted Heart" was then released as a second single from the film. It was made available for streaming and digital download on September 27, 2019. Three days ahead of the single's release Aguilera tweeted: "I’m so excited be a part of this iconic favorite creepy, kooky, mysterious and spooky fam." In 2021, she also contributed to The Addams Family 2 soundtrack, and recorded a new version of the franchise's classic musical theme.

== Composition ==
"Haunted Heart" is a torch song which tells the story of a gothic love story, and mainly incorporates pop, soul and jazz genres, as well as elements of blues and R&B. Some music critics noted that "Haunted Heart" was in style with Aguilera's fifth studio album Back to Basics (2006). Among the instruments used during the recording sessions were baritone saxophones, muted jazz-styled drums, and horns, and the track itself opens with the sound of a siren. Aguilera revealed that the song "resonated" with her because it gave her the opportunity to portray a certain character. She was also captivated by its retro style and soulful convention. While recording "Haunted Heart," Aguilera was inspired by the work of Billie Holiday and Screamin' Jay Hawkins, as well as their "predatory" vocal style.

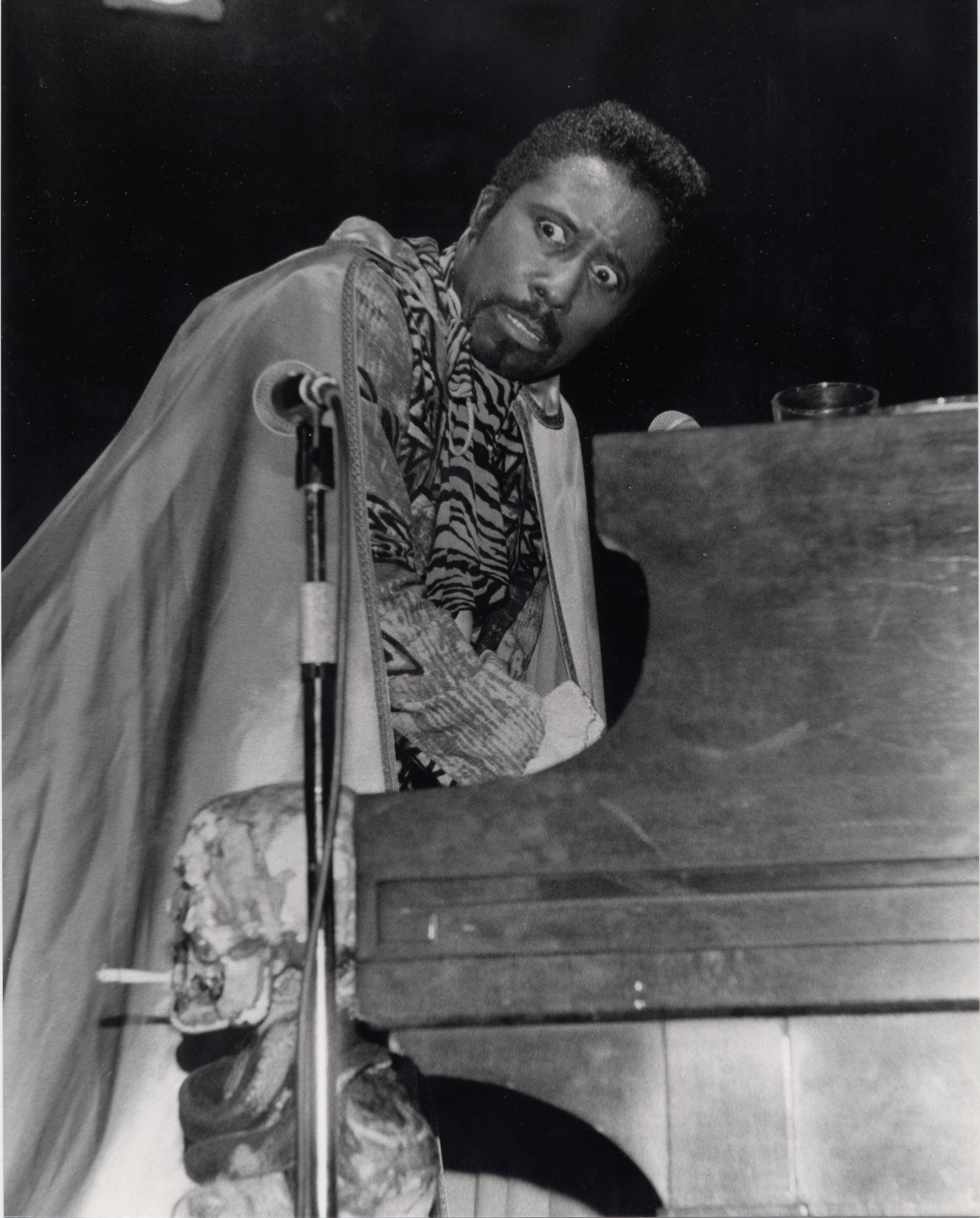
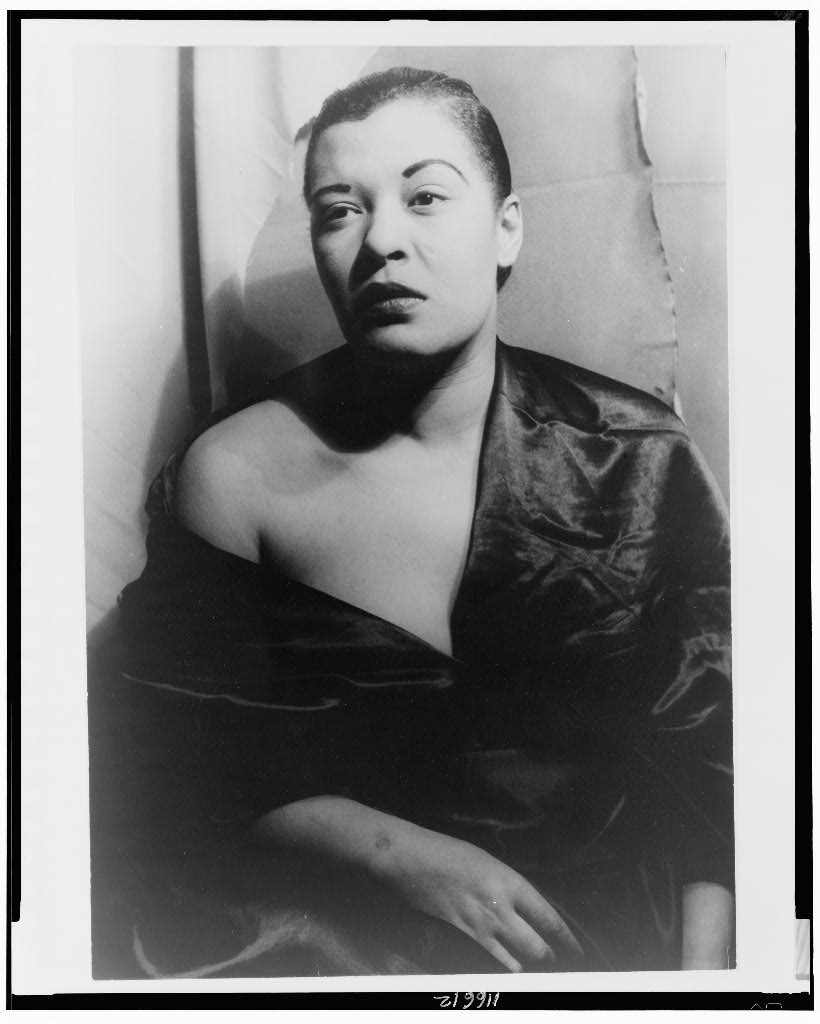
The song was partially inspired by the work of Screamin' Jay Hawkins and Billie Holiday.

The song was written by Aguilera, Antonina Armato, and Tim Jones (comprising the duo Rock Mafia), and the two latter are responsible for the production. It is dedicated to a character from The Addams Family film, Morticia Addams, and is used in the opening scene, introducing the animation. The song follows the convention of a love ballad and portrays Morticia as a strong and intimidating woman, and as a gothic icon. In the context of the movie, the song also tells the story of a passionate relationship between Morticia and Gomez Addams. In the song, the singer warns her lover, saying: "My heart is a haunted house; once you're in, you ain't getting out. It's the trap you've been waiting for; ain't no windows, ain't no doors."

The song's lyrics are filled with eerie metaphors (e.g. "Whisper low in my ears; before you try to get your hooks in me"), referencing the macabre, which was hyperbolized in the original Addams Family comics.

== Critical reception ==
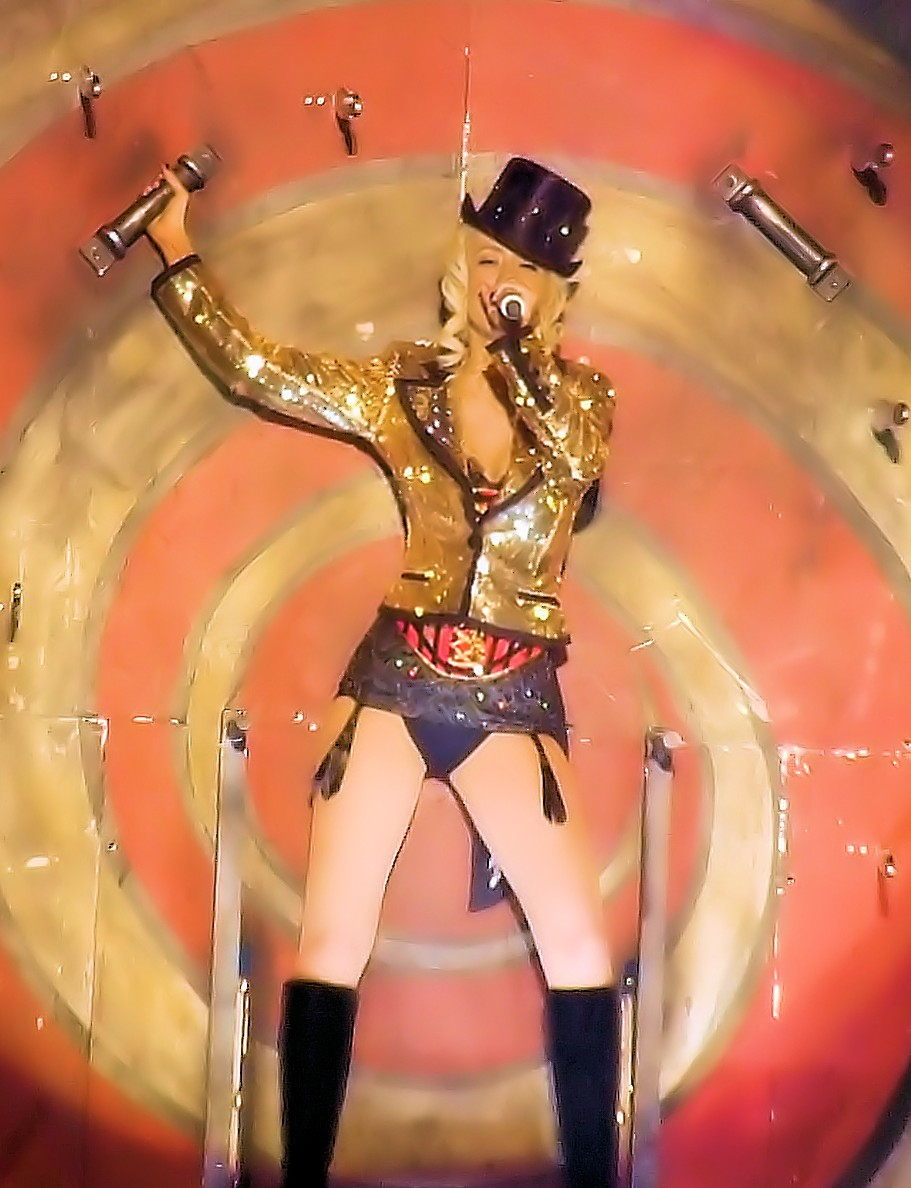
Several critics applauded the song for its "Back to Basics vibe".

The song received critical acclaim. Althea Legaspi of Rolling Stone called it a "romantically foreboding", "fittingly haunting, dramatic track", and noted that it was "soulfully" sang by Aguilera. Billboard lauded the song as "sassy" and "brassy", and opined that Aguilera sings it "with all the heart and soul we expect from the pop superstar". Julie Muncy from io9/Gizmondo described "Haunted Heart" as a "badass song" and praised Aguilera's "crisp" vocals. E! Online editor Billy Nilles complimented the track's "jazzy instrumentals" and its "Back to Basics vibes", as well as Aguilera's vocal delivery. The reviewer added: "One listen and you'll find yourself under her [the singer's] spell".

Mike Wilton of All Hallow's Geek believed that "the track deviates a bit from the singer's traditional pop and R&B sound and harkens back to 1950s". He also compared "Haunted Heart" to "I Put a Spell on You" — a song composed and recorded by Screamin' Jay Hawkins. Michiel Vos from A Bit of Pop Music wrote that "Haunted Heart" is "theatrical", "suspenseful" and "freakishly catchy". He applauded its "more than decent hook and production" and Aguilera's "expressive", "slightly creepy vocal performance". Stephanie Tzogas (Harlequin.com) praised the song's lyrics and Aguilera's singing, noting that she "kills it with her incredible voice".

In her article for PopSugar UK Angela Law considered the song a possible "Halloween anthem of 2019", and All-Noise named it a catchy, "creepy bop". Consequence's Nina Corcoran complimented the song's lyrics and sound, noting that "it’s just the right amount of eerie without being a full-blown scary song." Additionally, she lauded Aguilera's "dramatic" vocals and the track's fitting, "retro pop style". Writing for StyleCaster, Brandy Robidoux called "Haunted Heart" "seductive", and ranked it at number ten on the list of "haunting pop songs that will immediately get you in the spooky spirit". Michele Mendez from Elite Daily placed it at number four on her list of the best Halloween songs, and Lauren Miolene ranked it on a similar list for The Bash. Since then, "Haunted Heart" has been placed on similar rankings for Yahoo!, Entertainment Focus, InsideHook, and CultureSlate.

=== Accolades ===
Awards and nominations for "Haunted Heart"
Year	Award	Category	Result	Ref.
2019	Hollywood Music in Media Award	Best Original Song in an Animated Film	Nominated	
2019	Iconic Award	Best Single by a Foreign Artist	Nominated	

== Music video and promotion ==
Promotional lyric video for "Haunted Heart" premiered on Aguilera's official YouTube channel on September 27, 2019, two weeks before the film was theatrically released. It features scenes from The Addams Family, especially those with the animated Morticia, as well as shots from the recording studio where Aguilera sings in front of a microphone. Three days later, the video was uploaded to the Metro-Goldwyn-Mayer's YouTube channel as well.

On September 12, 2019, Aguilera was a guest at the 31 Nights of Halloween Fan Fest event organized by Freeform. She performed the song in front of an audience for the first time. It aired on television on October 5, 2019. Lauren Piester of E! Online called the performance "delightfully spooky". Aguilera also promoted the song during her interviews at The Kelly Clarkson Show, and at Andy Cohen's Deep & Shallow radio show for SiriusXM.

== Personnel ==
- Christina Aguilera – vocals, songwriting
- Rock Mafia (i.e. Antonina Armato, Tim James) – production, songwriting, mastering, audio mixing
- Oscar Ramirez – vocal recording
- Adam Comstock, Steve Hammons – audio engineering

Credits adapted from Tidal and Discogs.

== Charts ==
Chart (2019)	Peak position
France (SNEP)	109
LyricFind Global Songs (Billboard)	7
US Kid Digital Song Sales (Billboard)	1

== Release history ==
Region	Date	Format	Label	Ref.
Various	September 27, 2019	Digital download; streaming	RCA	
