= Onward (film) =

2020 film by Dan Scanlon

- Theatrical release poster
- Directed by: Dan Scanlon
- Screenplay by: Dan Scanlon; Jason Headley; Keith Bunin
- Story by: Dan Scanlon; Keith Bunin; Jason Headley
- Produced by: Kori Rae
- Starring: Tom Holland; Chris Pratt; Julia Louis-Dreyfus; Octavia Spencer
- Cinematography: Sharon Calahan; Adam Habib
- Edited by: Catherine Apple
- Music by: Mychael Danna; Jeff Danna
- Production company: Pixar Animation Studios
- Distributed by: Walt Disney Studios; Motion Pictures (Note: Distributed under the Walt Disney Pictures banner.)
- Release dates: February 21, 2020 (Berlinale); March 6, 2020 (United States)
- Running time: 102 minutes
- Country: United States
- Language: English
- Budget: $200 million
- Box office: $141.9 million

Onward is a 2020 American animated fantasy adventure film directed by Dan Scanlon and written by Scanlon, Jason Headley, and Keith Bunin. (Note: Scanlon, Headley, and Bunin were all credited as both "Screenplay by" and "Story by".) Produced by Pixar Animation Studios for Walt Disney Pictures, it stars the voices of Tom Holland, Chris Pratt, Julia Louis-Dreyfus and Octavia Spencer. The film, set in a suburban fantasy world for the modern day, follows two elf brothers named Ian and Barley Lightfoot (Holland and Pratt, respectively) who set out on a quest to find an artifact that will temporarily revive their dead father, Wilden (Kyle Bornheimer) for twenty-four hours.

After directing Monsters University (2013), Scanlon was encouraged to develop personal stories. The concept of Onward is based on the death of Scanlon's father, who died in a car accident when Scanlon and his older brother were very young children, and their relationship with each other. He began to write the story after hearing an audio clip of his father. The film was announced at D23 Expo in July 2017, with the title being revealed in December 2018, alongside the voice cast. The animation team chose to give the film's magic a unique style after studying several animated films featuring magic in order to fit with its suburban setting. Development on Onward lasted for six years. Composers Mychael and Jeff Danna were hired to compose the film's musical score, with Brandi Carlile contributing an original end credits song for the film.

Onward premiered at the 70th Berlin International Film Festival on February 21, 2020, and was theatrically released in the United States on March 6, 2020. The film received positive critical reception, but underperformed at the box office, grossing $141 million worldwide against its between $175–200 million budget. The COVID-19 pandemic contributed to its financial shortcomings, due to the widespread closure of theaters. Like several other films released in the early months of 2020, it found far greater success on VOD. The film was nominated for Best Animated Feature Film at the 78th Golden Globe Awards and 93rd Academy Awards. Onward was the last Pixar film released in theaters worldwide until Lightyear in 2022.

== Plot ==
Long ago, in a world inhabited by mythical creatures, magic was commonplace, although it was difficult to master. As technology progressed over the centuries, magic became obsolete and eventually fell out of use.

In the modern day, Ian Lightfoot is a teenage elf struggling with self-confidence; his older brother Barley is an enthusiastic and impulsive role-playing gamer. Their father Wilden died shortly before Ian's birth, and their mother Laurel has a new boyfriend, centaur police officer Colt Bronco, whom the brothers dislike. On Ian's 16th birthday, Laurel gives the boys a gift from Wilden: a magical staff, a rare Phoenix gem, and a letter describing a "visitation spell" that can resurrect Wilden for one day. Ian succeeds in casting the spell but is interrupted by Barley before completing it; consequently, only the lower half of Wilden's body reforms before the gem disintegrates. The brothers embark on a quest to acquire another gem and finish the spell before sunset, taking Barley's beloved van "Guinevere". Laurel discovers the boys have gone missing and sets out after them.

Seeking a map to the gem, the brothers visit the Manticore's Tavern with Wilden in tow. The tavern, once a gathering place for would-be adventurers, is now a family restaurant managed by the Manticore ("Corey"). During an argument with Ian over the map, Corey realizes how mundane her life has become and drives out her customers in a fit of rage, accidentally setting fire to the map and the restaurant. The only remaining clue to the gem's location is a children's menu suggesting Raven's Point, a nearby mountain. Soon after the boys leave, Laurel arrives and befriends Corey; Corey warns her that the brothers' journey may awaken a curse that can only be defeated by her special sword, which the women steal from a pawn shop.

Ian, Barley, and Wilden travel to the mountains, narrowly escaping encounters with the police and a motorcycle gang of sprites. Officer Bronco catches up to the group and orders them to return home; Ian appears to comply but unexpectedly drives away, leading to a wild police chase. Barley sacrifices Guinevere to cause a landslide, blocking their pursuers. "Raven's Point" is revealed to be a series of raven statues leading down into a cave. While exploring, Barley confesses that he was too afraid to say goodbye to Wilden on his deathbed. The party make their way through the cave, evading a series of increasingly dangerous traps, and emerge on the other side, only to find themselves back in town in front of Ian's high school. Believing their quest has been in vain, Ian lashes out at Barley and calls him a screw-up before leaving with Wilden.

As the sun begins to set, Ian sadly reviews his list of things he always wanted to do with his father and realizes that Barley has been a father figure to him throughout his life. Meanwhile, Barley discovers the gem inside a historic fountain and retrieves it, unknowingly triggering the curse. Pieces of the high school and other nearby objects combine to form a dragon-shaped golem, intent on retrieving the gem. Corey flies in with Laurel, who drives the magic sword into the dragon's heart, giving Ian enough time to recast the visitation spell. As Wilden's upper body regenerates, Barley volunteers to distract the dragon so Ian can meet their father. Instead, Ian sends Barley ahead, acknowledging the role his brother played in his upbringing. With help from Laurel, Ian manages to fight off the dragon and destroy it, granting Barley the opportunity to find closure with their father. After Wilden dissipates, Barley tells Ian that their father is proud of him, and the brothers share a hug.

Some time later, Ian's confidence and spell-casting abilities have improved. As the world begins to rediscover magic, Ian and Barley set off on a new quest together.

== Voice cast ==
- Tom Holland as Ian Lightfoot, a teenager elf who longs for his deceased father.
- Chris Pratt as Barley Lightfoot, Ian's older brother, who longs for a magical quest.
- Julia Louis-Dreyfus as Laurel Lightfoot, the widowed mother of Ian and Barley
- Octavia Spencer as "Corey" The Manticore, a manticore who is the proprietor of the Manticore's Tavern.
- Kyle Bornheimer as Wilden Lightfoot, Ian and Barley's late father. Ian and Barley's objective is to resurrect him for 24 hours.
- Mel Rodriguez as Colt Bronco, a centaur police officer and Laurel's boyfriend.
- Lena Waithe as Specter, a cyclops police officer.
- Ali Wong as Gore, a faun police officer.
- Grey Griffin as Dewdrop, a pixie and the leader of the Pixie Dusters biker gang.
- Tracey Ullman as Grecklin, a goblin pawn shop owner.
- Wilmer Valderrama as Gaxton, an elf and college friend of Wilden.
- George Psarras as Avel, an elf police officer.
- John Ratzenberger as Fennwick, a cyclops construction worker. This was Ratzenberger's final role in a Pixar feature film until Inside Out 2 (2024), having voiced a character in every prior feature film.

== Production ==
=== Development ===
While directing Monsters University (2013), Dan Scanlon was encouraged to develop personal stories. He did not talk to his brother about the film, because he wanted to keep him in the dark as these movies take so long to make. In July 2017, then-studio head of Pixar John Lasseter announced that a "suburban fantasy world" film at the D23 Expo was in development, with Scanlon directing and Kori Rae producing. The film was inspired by the death of Scanlon's father, when he was just a year old and his older brother only three, and their relationship with each other. They had seen home videos about their father, but there was no audio. Scanlon became inspired to write the story after a family member found an old cassette with his father's voice on it. He listened to it along with his brother and mother, and at the very end just two words from the father could be heard; "Hii" and "Goodbye", which Scanlon described as "magical". On December 12, 2018, the title was revealed. In 2019, Jason Headley and Keith Bunin were hired to rewrite the screenplay and story. According to Scanlon, Onward spent six years in development.

=== Casting ===
On December 12, 2018, Tom Holland, Chris Pratt, Julia Louis-Dreyfus and Octavia Spencer were announced as starring in the film. While having recorded most of their lines separately, Holland and Pratt had some of their recording sessions together since, according to Scanlon, "they've worked together before and hung out together." Rae stated that Holland and Pratt improvised some of their lines while recording together. On December 17, 2019, Ali Wong, Lena Waithe and Mel Rodriguez joined the cast of the film. On February 18, 2020, Wilmer Valderrama, Tracey Ullman, Kyle Bornheimer, and George Psarras were revealed to have voice roles as well, and John Ratzenberger's appearance was officially confirmed.

=== Deleted scene ===
One storyboard scene featured Ian, Barley, and Wilden joining with a goat girl in the journey. Ian and the goat girl come across a booth hosted by three evil mermaids. The mermaids sing their mesmerizing song to lure the two into staying in one of three houses put for rent. Ian tries to silence them with the staff but the spell is too weak. When Ian and the goat girl are finally in a trance, the mermaids place them in one of the houses. The house they are in starts to sink into the ground.

The goat girl was omitted because the filmmakers wanted the film to focus on the relationship between Ian and Barley. The scene itself was removed because the filmmakers felt it was too grim.

=== Animation ===
According to effects supervisor Vincent Serritella, the animators wanted the spells to be "something that's abstract" but also "personify it", so they "had to converge on the idea of an image of magic, go back to the base level of the sequences and the spells, and what level [of complexity] would be given, and how it affects the environment". Director Dan Scanlon said that Ian's arc "was helpful to [the animators] because [they] could use that for all of the magic we designed". The animators chose to give the film's magic a unique style after studying several animated films featuring magic such as Fantasia, Aladdin, and Hercules. Animators wanted the film's magic to fit with its suburban setting.

Animators first developed the film's magic using hand-drawn animated drawings, before turning them into computer-animated effects, with Serritella saying that "[they] made shapes and graphic elements that really lend themselves to what's happening in a 2D environment". Serritella also said that "the key" was mixing hand-drawn and computer animation, arguing that "[g]oing one way or the other didn't work. Going too graphic didn't fit into the world that the background and the characters were created in. And going too physical in an animated world seemed too real", so "[they] found the right balance" by turning hand-drawn animated graphics into "light objects" and giving them "[a] true volumetric, glowing atmosphere". He further added that the choreography during the "visitation spell" sequence "came directly from 2D", while the CGI animation and lighting provided "depth perception". The film was completed on November 21, 2019.

== Music ==
On April 16, 2019, Mychael and Jeff Danna, who both previously worked with the studio on The Good Dinosaur (2015), were revealed to be the film's composers. On February 12, 2020, Brandi Carlile revealed she recorded the song "Carried Me With You" for the film's end credits, co-written with Phil and Tim Hanseroth. The film's soundtrack was released on February 28, 2020, seven days ahead of the film's release.

== Marketing ==
In the month of the release of the film, the world builder video game Disney Magic Kingdoms included a limited time "Onward Event" to promote it, with the characters involved in a new storyline unrelated to the events of the film, including Ian, Barley, Wilden (referred to as "Dad"), Laurel, The Manticore, Officer Colt and Blazey as playable characters, in addition to some attractions based on locations of the film.

== Release ==
=== Theatrical ===
Onward premiered at the 70th Berlin International Film Festival on February 21, 2020 and was theatrically released in the United States on March 6. A short film titled Playdate with Destiny, which is centered around Maggie Simpson from The Simpsons, appeared before the feature film. As the COVID-19 pandemic appeared to recede, the film was released in Australia and New Zealand on April 24, 2020, South Korea on June 17, 2020, Italy on August 19, 2020, and Japan on August 21, 2020..

The movie was also released in 3D, 2D, Dolby Cinema, 4DX and ScreenX worldwide and in IMAX and Dolby Atmos in selected theaters.

=== Ban and censorship ===
The film was banned in the Arab countries of Kuwait, Oman, Qatar, and Saudi Arabia, as one female cyclops police officer character in the film named Specter (voiced by Lena Waithe) briefly indicates that she is a lesbian. The scene in question is a brief scene in which a simulacrum of Colt Bronco is lamenting about how Ian and Barley Lightfoot do not respect him as a father figure. Specter replies to him by saying, "It's not easy being a new parent—my girlfriend's daughter got me pulling my hair out, okay?" Homosexual acts are criminalized in the four countries, which are predominantly Muslim, although Kuwait does not criminalize female homosexual acts. The film was screened in Bahrain, the United Arab Emirates, Lebanon, and Egypt, albeit the line was changed in the Arabic dub to "my sister's daughter".

The Russian dub, due to the Russian gay propaganda law officially criminalizing the dissemination of LGBT-related content to minors under 18, changed the line to "my partner's daughter". The Russian dub also avoided referring to Specter with gender-specific pronouns. The scene was also changed similarly in Poland and Hungary.

=== Home media ===
Onward was released digitally on March 20, 2020, and became available to Disney+ subscribers on April 3, 2020, in response to the COVID-19 pandemic. The digital release came just two weeks after the film's theatrical debut and prior to the standard 90-day theatrical window. The announcement followed Disney's early digital releases of Frozen II on Disney+ and Star Wars: The Rise of Skywalker on Digital HD due to the pandemic. The film was later released on DVD, Blu-ray, and Ultra HD Blu-ray by Walt Disney Studios Home Entertainment on May 19, 2020.

In the United States, Onward ranked No. 1 on iTunes and No. 8 on Amazon among all rental offerings as of March 22. By March 26, it was the sixth most-watched film on Amazon Prime and the second most-watched on iTunes. The film placed ninth on the "Watched at Home" chart for the week ending June 6, which tracks U.S. digital sales, rentals, and disc sales, according to the Digital Entertainment Group. It also ranked third on the U.S. combined DVD and Blu-ray sales chart for June 2020, up from fourth place in May, following its May 19 home media release, according to the NPD VideoScan First Alert chart. In the United Kingdom, Onward claimed the top spot on the Official Film Chart for the week ending October 21. It overtook Warner Bros's Scoob!, which had been at the top for four consecutive weeks. It maintained its position at No. 1 for the week ending October 28, driven largely by strong DVD and Blu-ray Disc sales, which accounted for 90% of its sales. Onward finished ahead of Frozen II.

Nielsen Media Research, which records streaming viewership on U.S. television screens, reported that Onward was the fourth most-streamed film of 2020, with 8.3 billion minutes viewed.

== Reception ==
=== Box office ===
Onward grossed $61.6 million in the United States and Canada, and $80.4 million in other territories, for a worldwide total of $142 million. The gross of the film was significantly affected by the COVID-19 pandemic, which first reduced movie theater attendance, then forced most to shut down within two weeks of the film's release.

In the United States and Canada, the film was released alongside The Way Back and the wide expansion of Emma, and was projected to gross $45–50 million from 4,200 theaters in its opening weekend. The film held early advance screenings on February 29, making $650,000 from 470 theaters. It then grossed $12.1 million on its first day, the 6th, including $2 million from Thursday night previews. The film went on to debut to $39.1 million, topping the box office but marking the third-ever lowest start for a Pixar film. While the film remained in first in its second weekend, it dropped 73% to $10.5 million (the lowest-ever second weekend for a Pixar film), and was part of the lowest grossing box office weekend since October 1998, with all films combining for just $55.3 million. In the film's third weekend, due to the mass theater closures around the country, it made $71,000 from 135 locations, mostly drive-in theaters.

=== Critical response ===
On Rotten Tomatoes, the film has an approval rating of 88% based on 347 reviews, with an average rating of 7.2/10. The website's critics consensus reads, "It may suffer in comparison to Pixar's classics, but Onward makes effective use of the studio's formula – and stands on its own merits as a funny, heartwarming, dazzlingly animated adventure." On Metacritic, the film has a weighted average score of 61 out of 100, based on 56 critics, indicating "generally favorable" reviews. Audiences polled by CinemaScore gave the film an average grade of "A−" on an A+ to F scale, and PostTrak reported filmgoers gave it 4.5 out of 5 stars.

Peter Bradshaw of The Guardian rated the film three out of five stars, and called it "a likable family comedy that finds an easy rhythm without effort," though he felt that the movie's "attitude towards death" is not as radically powerful as in Coco. In a same star review Peter Travers of Rolling Stone said "It's no Toy Story—but the animation juggernaut's latest, about two elf brothers on a quest, is still worth your while." Reviewer James Berardinelli praised the film's originality and emotional weight and called it "engaging and enjoyable", adding "there's something here for everyone", though concluded it is not the next Disney/Pixar classic. Ben Travis of Empire gave the film five out of five stars, and wrote, "Pixar returns with a great big power-chord of a movie—heart-pumping, resonant, and positively harmonious."

Richard Roeper of the Chicago Sun-Times called Onward a step back for Pixar, giving it two out of four stars. He said, "The story fluctuates between the uninspired and the just plain weird and then gets even weirder." While he praised the animation and said that the movie "begins with an intriguing premise", he concluded that it "doesn't come close to fully fleshing out the possibilities."

=== Year-end lists ===
- 1st – Kyle Smith – National Review
- 5th – Max Evry – Comingsoon.net
- 7th – Johnny Oleksinski – New York Post

=== Accolades ===
Year	Award	Category	Recipients	Result	Ref.
2020	BMI Film & TV Awards	Film Music	Mychael Danna and Jeff Danna	Won	
2020	People's Choice Awards	The Family Movie of 2020	Onward	Won	
2020	Dublin International Film Festival	Feature Film	Onward	Won	
2020	Hollywood Critics Association Midseason Awards	Best Picture	Onward	Nominated	
2020	Houston Film Critics Society Awards	Best Animated Feature Film	Onward	Nominated	
2020	San Diego Film Critics Society Awards	Best Animated Film	Onward	Nominated	
2020	St. Louis Film Critics Association Awards	Best Animated Film	Onward	Nominated	
2021	Academy Awards	Best Animated Feature	Dan Scanlon and Kori Rae	Nominated	
2021	American Cinema Editors Awards	Best Edited Animated Feature Film	Catherine Apple	Nominated	
2021	Annie Awards	Best Animated Feature	Kori Rae	Nominated	
2021	Annie Awards	Writing in an Animated Feature Production	Dan Scanlon, Jason Headley and Keith Bunin	Nominated	
2021	Annie Awards	Editorial in an Animated Feature Production	Catherine Apple, Anna Wolitzky and Dave Suther	Nominated	
2021	Annie Awards	Outstanding Achievement for Character Animation in an Animated Feature Production	Shaun Chacko	Nominated	
2021	Annie Awards	Outstanding Achievement for Music in an Animated Feature Production	Mychael Danna and Jeff Danna	Nominated	
2021	Annie Awards	Outstanding Achievement for Production Design in an Animated Feature Production	Noah Klocek, Sharon Calahan, Huy Nguyen, Bert Berry and Paul Conrad	Nominated	
2021	Annie Awards	Outstanding Achievement for Voice Acting in an Animated Feature Production	Tom Holland	Nominated	
2021	Art Directors Guild Awards	Excellence in Production Design for an Animated Film	Noah Klocek	Nominated	
2021	Austin Film Critics Association Awards	Best Animated Film	Onward	Nominated	
2021	British Academy Film Awards	Best Animated Film	Dan Scanlon and Kori Rae	Nominated	
2021	Cinema Audio Society Awards	Outstanding Achievement in Sound Mixing for a Motion Picture – Animated	Vincent Caro, Doc Kane, Michael Semanick, Juan Peralta, Brad Haehnel and Scott Curtis	Nominated	
2021	Critics' Choice Super Awards	Best Animated Movie	Onward	Nominated	
2021	Critics' Choice Super Awards	Best Voice Actor In An Animated Movie	Tom Holland	Nominated	
2021	Critics' Choice Super Awards	Best Voice Actor In An Animated Movie	Chris Pratt	Nominated	
2021	Critics' Choice Super Awards	Best Voice Actress In An Animated Movie	Octavia Spencer	Nominated	
2021	Golden Globe Awards	Best Animated Feature Film	Onward	Nominated	
2021	Grammy Awards	Best Song Written for Visual Media	"Carried Me with You" – Brandi Carlile, Phil Hanseroth and Tim Hanseroth	Nominated	
2021	Hollywood Music in Media Awards	Best Original Score in an Animated Film	Mychael Danna and Jeff Danna	Nominated	
2021	Hollywood Music in Media Awards	Best Original Song in an Animated Film	"Carried Me with You" – Brandi Carlile, Phil Hanseroth and Tim Hanseroth	Nominated	
2021	Hollywood Music in Media Awards	Best Soundtrack Album	Onward	Nominated	
2021	Motion Picture Sound Editors Awards	Outstanding Achievement in Sound Editing – Feature Animation	Shannon Mills, Nia Hansen, Chris Gridley, Josh Gold, David C. Hughes, Samson Neslund, Kimberly Patrick, Christopher Flick, Steve Orlando, Erich Stratmann, Shelley Roden and John Roesch	Nominated	
2021	Nickelodeon Kids' Choice Awards	Favorite Animated Movie	Onward	Nominated	
2021	Nickelodeon Kids' Choice Awards	Favorite Voice from an Animated Movie	Chris Pratt	Nominated	
2021	Saturn Awards	Best Animated Film	Onward	Won	
2021	Visual Effects Society Awards	Outstanding Visual Effects in an Animated Feature	Dan Scanlon, Kori Rae, Sanjay Bakshi and Vincent Serritella	Nominated	
2021	Visual Effects Society Awards	Outstanding Animated Character in an Animated Feature	Kristopher Campbell, Jonas Jarvers, Rob Jensen and Jacob Kuenzel (for Dad Pants)	Nominated	
2021	Visual Effects Society Awards	Outstanding Created Environment in an Animated Feature	Eric Andraos, Laura Grieve, Nick Pitera and Michael Rutter (for Swamp Gas)	Nominated	
2021	Visual Effects Society Awards	Outstanding Effects Simulations in an Animated Feature	Dave Hale, Jonah Blue Laird, Stephen Marshall and Ricardo Nadu	Nominated	

== Lawsuit ==
In January 2020, San Francisco tattoo artist Sweet Cicely Daniher filed a copyright lawsuit against Disney, Pixar, and Onward producer Kori Rae. In September 2018, Pixar rented Daniher's "Vanicorn", a van decorated with a unicorn-themed mural painted by a local artist and based on the painting "Moonlight Magic" by Sharlene Lindskog-Osorio, for use at an event on the Pixar Animation Studios lot in September 2018. She learned about the production of Onward in May 2019 and, after seeing images of the van used by Ian and Barley Lightfoot in the film, came to believe that Pixar had copied the design of the Vanicorn in violation of her rental agreement with the company, as well as the Digital Millennium Copyright Act, the Visual Artists Rights Act, and the California Artists Protection Act. She sought in her suit to prohibit distribution of the film and any infringing advertisement or merchandise. The case was dismissed, after Daniher's copyright on the design was cancelled in March 2020 as it was "based on a pre-existing work" and that "she was not the author of the Vanicorn, because she hired someone to paint the unicorn mural". Daniher then attempted to sue Pixar for breach of the Lease Contract, but this second lawsuit was denied in May 2022.

== Other media ==
Ian, the Manticore and Barley appear as playable characters in the mobile game Disney Heroes: Battle Mode.
