= Jeff Danna =

Canadian film composer

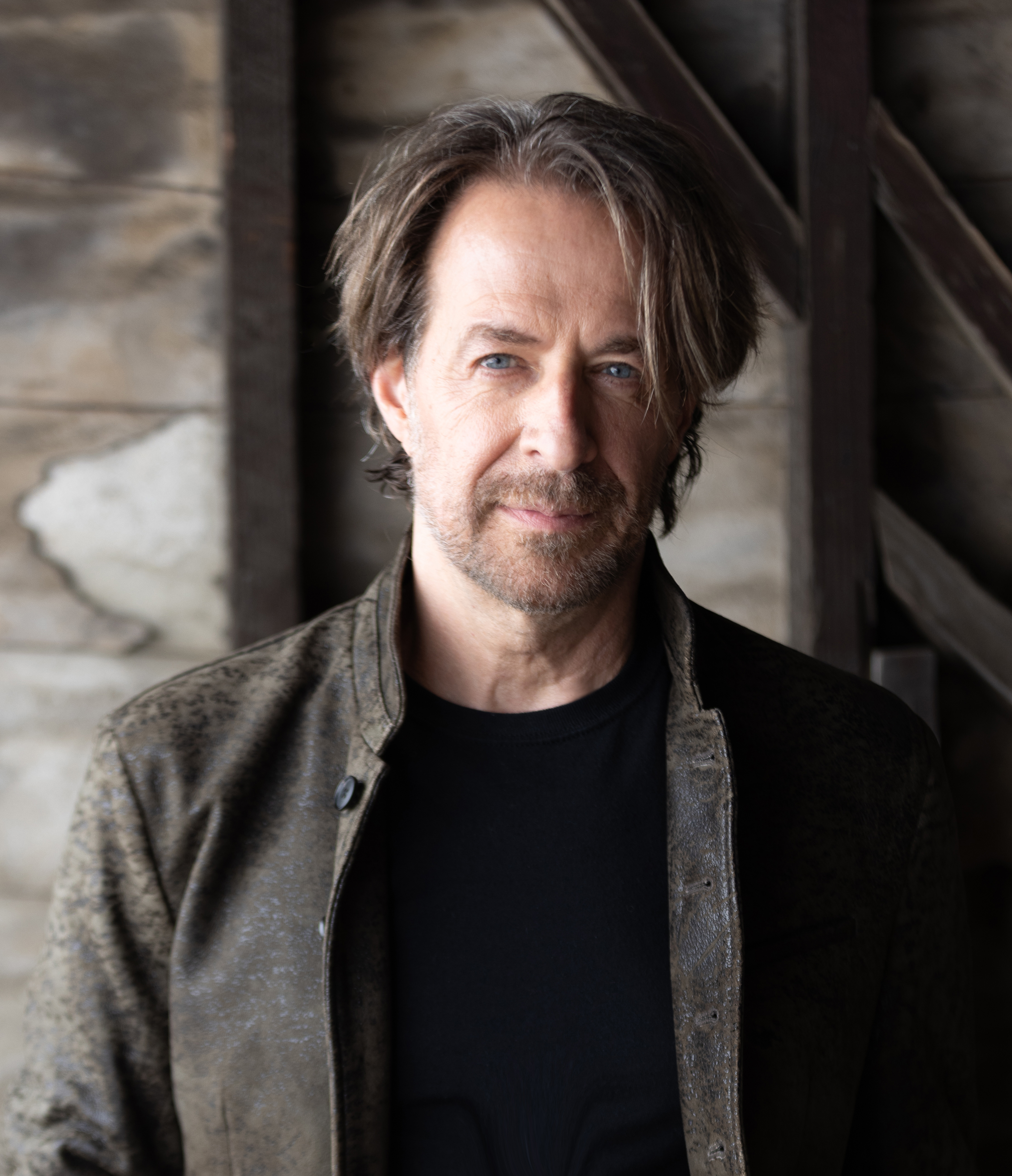
- Danna in August 2023

Background information
- Born: 1964 (age 61–62); Burlington, Ontario, Canada
- Origin: Toronto, Ontario, Canada
- Genres: Film and television scores, Celtic, jazz, rock, electronic
- Occupation: Composer
- Instruments: Piano, keyboards, synthesizer, guitar
- Years active: 1989–present
- Website: www.jeffdanna.com

Jeff Danna (born 1964) is a Canadian film and television composer. He has composed or co-composed scores for a wide range of films and television, including The Boondock Saints (1999), Resident Evil: Apocalypse (2004), Silent Hill (2006), The Imaginarium of Doctor Parnassus (2009), The Good Dinosaur (2015), Storks (2016), The Breadwinner (2017), The Addams Family (2019), Onward (2020), Guillermo Del Toro's Tales of Arcadia (2019-2021), My Father's Dragon (2022), Julia (2022), Churchill at War (2024) and The Hunting Wives (2025).

His older brother, composer Mychael Danna, is a frequent collaborator, and the two have received Emmy nominations for their work on Camelot (2011), Tyrant (2014-2016), and Alias Grace (2017). Additionally, Danna has been nominated for six Annie Awards, won five BMI Film & TV Awards, a Gemini Award, a Genie award, two Hollywood Music in Media Awards, and 15 SOCAN Awards.

== Early life ==
Danna was born in Burlington, Ontario, to a musical family active in local theatre and church choir. A reluctant young piano student, Danna found solace in an electric guitar left behind at his home by a friend. Unknowingly following in the path of three generations of Winnipeg mandolin players, progress came quickly. He began playing professionally at the age of 15 until a hand injury brought his performance career to a halt at 22.

== Career ==
Danna's first foray into film scoring occurred while recovering from his injury. Unable to play for extended periods of time, his brother, Mychael, suggested that he record the guitar parts on some of Mychael's first scores, figuring that they could take breaks at intervals as necessitated by his injury. Seeing a way to sustain his music career, Danna turned to film scoring. Subsequently, the brothers' first co-writing venture, Cold Comfort, was nominated for a Genie award and laid the foundation for Jeff's career in film and many future collaborations with his brother.

After cutting his teeth on independent Canadian features, Danna moved to Los Angeles to begin his work in television, landing jobs on the CBS crime show Sweating Bullets, Beverly Hills 90210, and the Warner Brothers' legacy title, Kung Fu: The Legend Continues. A series of television movies followed, notably Showtime' My Own Country for director Mira Nair, The Matthew Shepard Story (a Gemini Best Score winner), Ice Bound, and Spinning Boris for director Roger Spottiswoode.

Feature film work began with the indie Uncorked (At Sachem Farm), starring Minnie Driver and Rufus Sewell, featuring the on-camera fingerstyle guitar solo showcase of the influential "Ross' Concert," played in the studio by Danna and Dean Parks. This was followed by the cult classic The Boondock Saints, which featured choral and orchestral elements mixed with electronica, along with "The Blood Of Cu Chulainn", a Danna brothers' offering from their album, A Celtic Romance.

Following that was Tim Blake Nelson's O, a modern-day retelling of Shakespeare's Othello. Danna took the opportunity of the Shakespeare connection to employ a vielle and a Viola Da Gamba in combination with dark orchestral colors, his first of many uses of early music instruments in his scores. By the time O was released in theaters, Danna was at work again with Tim Blake Nelson on his World War II Holocaust drama The Grey Zone. Nelson's desire for an onerous death camp atmosphere meant that there would be no score in the film until the final credits, where Danna composed a dissonant and powerful dirge, merging a small chamber group with Klezmer soloists, using an approach akin to modes of limited transposition to evoke both a terrible beauty and desolation.

2001 brought forth the first of many collaborations with acclaimed filmmaker Brett Morgen on The Kid Stays in the Picture, a celebrated retelling of producer Robert Evans' book of the same title.

In 2003, Danna was in London working with The London Philharmonia on the large-scale score for The Gospel of John, a medley of which the Philharmonia performed in their summer concert at Royal Festival Hall.

Resident Evil: Apocalypse followed in 2004, earning Danna four SOCAN Awards for International Film Music, and then a reunion with brother Mychael on Terry Gilliam's Tideland, their first time working together since their Celtic albums, seven years prior.

2006 and 2007 found Danna in Toronto, scoring the movie adaptation of the hit video game franchise Silent Hill for director Christophe Gans. Danna followed that with another Brett Morgen collaboration on Chicago 10, then legendary director Lord Richard Attenborough's final film, Closing the Ring, and another collaboration with Mychael for Fracture, the psychological legal crime thriller starring Anthony Hopkins and Ryan Gosling.

The following year, the brothers went on to score Sony's crime thriller Lakeview Terrace, starring Samuel Jackson. The duo then collaborated with Terry Gilliam again for The Imaginarium of Dr. Parnassus, which was nominated for Best Original Score for a Fantasy Film by the International Film Music Critics Awards. Danna's ongoing work with Brett Morgen brought forth Nimrod Nation, a 30-for-30 episode, and the acclaimed documentary Kurt Cobain: Montage of Heck.

In 2014, Jeff and Mychael wrote the original music for the FX series Tyrant, earning them both a Hollywood Music in Media Award for the Main Title, as well as Emmy nominations for Outstanding Music Composition for a Series (Original Dramatic Score) and Outstanding Original Main Title Theme Music, the same category for which they were previously Emmy-nominated for their work on Camelot in 2011.

In 2015, the brothers composed the score for Disney and Pixar's The Good Dinosaur, which received a BMI Film and TV Award for Film Music, three SOCAN Awards, a nomination for Best Original Score for an Animated Film by the International Film Music Critics Award, and an Annie nomination for Outstanding Achievement for Music in an Animated Feature Production. More sibling collaborations followed, notably the original score for Warner Brothers' animated film Storks which won a BMI Film and TV Award for Film Music, and Ang Lee's Billy Lynn's Long Halftime Walk.

In 2017, Jeff and Mychael undertook scoring Nora Twomey's The Breadwinner, which had its world premiere at the Toronto International Film Festival. The Breadwinner was nominated for an Annie Award for Outstanding Achievement for Music in an Animated Feature Production, won the Best Original Music Award from the Annecy International Animated Film Festival in France and won the Canadian Screen Award for Film Score of the Year. The brothers followed up that effort with Alias Grace for Netflix, for which they were Emmy nominated in 2018 and garnered a nomination for a Canadian Screen Award.

Returning to animation in 2018, Danna wrote the music for Guillermo del Toro's animated science-fantasy series Tales of Arcadia, which includes the titles 3Below, Wizards, and Rise of the Titans for Netflix and produced by DreamWorks Animation.

Jeff and Mychael then worked together to score the animated feature The Addams Family, released in 2019, which earned a BMI Film & TV Award for Film Music, and Disney & Pixar's Oscar-nominated animated film Onward, which opened in theaters on March 6, 2020, for which they received an Annie nomination for Best Music for a Feature, a BMI Film & TV Award for Film Music, and an International Film Music Critics Award nomination for Best Original Score for an Animated Film. Following that, he and Mychael wrote the original score for the MGM feature The Addams Family 2, earning them a Hollywood Music in Media Award for Best Original Score for an Animated Film and a BMI Film & TV Award for Film Music.

2021 and 2022 saw Danna working for HBO Max on the acclaimed series Julia, based on the life of iconic chef Julia Child, and he reteamed with Mychael and Cartoon Saloon co-founder Nora Twomey for My Father's Dragon. A reunion with Guillermo del Toro followed as Danna composed the music for the episode The Graveyard Rats in Guillermo del Toro's Cabinet of Curiosities.

== Filmography ==
=== Film ===
==== 1980s-1990s ====
Year	Title	Director	Studio(s)	Notes
1989	Cold Comfort	Vic Sarin	—N/a	Co-composed with Mychael Danna
1998	At Sachem Farm	John Huddles	—N/a	—N/a
1999	The Boondock Saints	Troy Duffy	Franchise Pictures; Indican Pictures; Brood Syndicate; Fried Films; Lloyd Segan Company; Chris Brinker Productions	—N/a
1999	New Blood	Michael Hurst	Lionsgate Films; Screenland Pictures; Scanbox International; Applecreek Communications; Spice Factory Ltd.	—N/a

==== 2000s ====
Year	Title	Director	Studio(s)	Notes
2001	Green Dragon	Timothy Lin Bui	Franchise Pictures Classics; Columbia Pictures	Co-composed with Mychael Danna
2001	O	Tim Blake Nelson	Daniel Fried Productions; Chickie the Cop; Lionsgate Entertainment	—N/a
2001	Monsters, Inc.	Pete Docter	Pixar Animation Studios; Walt Disney Pictures	Additional music Score composed by Randy Newman
2001	The Grey Zone	Tim Blake Nelson	Millennium Films; The Goatsingers; Killer Films; Lionsgate Films; Roadside Attractions	—N/a
2002	The Kid Stays in the Picture	Nanette Burstein; Brett Morgen	USA Films (United States); StudioCanal (International)	—N/a
2002	Easter	Richard Caliban	Anima Sola Productions, Inc.	—N/a
2003	Kart Racer	Stuart Gillard	Knightscove Entertainment; Apollo Media; Alliance Atlantis	—N/a
2003	Spinning Boris	Roger Spottiswoode	—N/a	—N/a
2004	Resident Evil: Apocalypse	Alexander Witt	Constantin Film; Davis Films; Impact Pictures; Screen Gems	—N/a
2005	Ripley Under Ground	Roger Spottiswoode	Fox Searchlight Pictures	—N/a
2005	Tideland	Terry Gilliam	Recorded Picture Company; Telefilm Canada; The Movie Network; Astral Media; HanWay Films; Revolver Entertainment (United Kingdom); Capri Films (Canada)	Co-composed with Mychael Danna
2006	Silent Hill	Christophe Gans	Silent Hill DCP Inc. Davis Films; Konami; Alliance Atlantis (Canada); Metropolitan Filmexport (France)	—N/a
2007	Chicago 10	Brett Morgen	Roadside Attractions; Consolidated Documentaries; Participant Productions; River Road Entertainment; Curious Pictures	—N/a
2007	Fracture	Gregory Hoblit	New Line Cinema (United States); Warner Bros. Pictures (Germany); Castle Rock Entertainment; Weinstock Entertainment; M7 Filmproduktion	Co-composed with Mychael Danna
2007	Closing the Ring	Richard Attenborough	The Works Distribution	—N/a
2008	Lakeview Terrace	Neil LaBute	Screen Gems; Overbrook Entertainment	Co-composed with Mychael Danna
2008	Finn on the Fly	Mark Jean	Amaze Film + Television; E1 Entertainment; Finn Prairie Productions; Stephen Onda Productions	—N/a
2009	The Boondock Saints II: All Saints Day	Troy Duffy	Stage 6 Films; Apparition	—N/a
2009	The Imaginarium of Doctor Parnassus	Terry Gilliam	Infinity Features; Poo Poo Pictures; Davis Films; Telefilm Canada; Lionsgate (United Kingdom); Metropolitan Filmexport (France); E1 Entertainment (Canada)	Co-composed with Mychael Danna
2009	Formosa Betrayed	Adam Kane	Living Films	—N/a
2009	The Cry of the Owl	Jamie Thraves	BBC Films; Myriad Pictures	—N/a
2009	Leaves of Grass	Tim Blake Nelson	Millennium Films; First Look Studios	—N/a

==== 2010s ====
Year	Title	Director	Studio(s)	Notes
2010	The Last Rites of Ransom Pride	Tiller Russell	Screen Media Films	—N/a
2010	Repeaters	Carl Bessai	Alliance Films; Rampart Films; Raven West Films; Resonance Films	—N/a
2011	Thin Ice	Jill Sprecher	Werc Werk Works; ATO Pictures	—N/a
2012	Silent Hill: Revelation	M. J. Bassett	Silent Hill 2 DCP Inc. Konami; Alliance Films (Canada); Metropolitan Filmexport (France)	—N/a
2012	Erased	Philipp Stölzl	RaDiUS-TWC; E-Motion; Informant Films Europe uMedia	—N/a
2015	Cobain: Montage of Heck	Brett Morgen	HBO Documentary Films; Universal Pictures; Public Road Productions; The End of Music	—N/a
2015	The Good Dinosaur	Peter Sohn	Pixar Animation Studios; Walt Disney Pictures	Co-composed with Mychael Danna
2015	Sanjay's Super Team	Sanjay Patel	Pixar Animation Studios; Walt Disney Pictures	Short film, co-composed with Mychael Danna
2015	Anesthesia	Tim Blake Nelson	Nicholson International Pictures; Hello Please; Grand Schema; Red Barn Films; IFC Films	—N/a
2016	Newtown	Kim A. Snyder	Abramorama	Additional music
2016	Storks	Nicholas Stoller; Doug Sweetland	Warner Bros. Pictures; Warner Animation Group; RatPac-Dune Entertainment; Stoller Global Solutions	Co-composed with Mychael Danna
2016	Billy Lynn's Long Halftime Walk	Ang Lee	TriStar Pictures; Studio 8 LStar Capital; Film4; Bona Film Group; The Ink Factory; Marc Platt Productions	Co-composed with Mychael Danna
2017	The Breadwinner	Nora Twomey	Cartoon Saloon; Aircraft Pictures; Guru Studio; Jolie Pas; Melusine Productions; Elevation Pictures (Canada); StudioCanal (Ireland)	Co-composed with Mychael Danna
2019	The Power of I	Steve Hickner; Gary Trousdale	Amazon Studios	Short film, co-composed with Mychael Danna
2019	The Addams Family	Conrad Vernon; Greg Tiernan	Bron Creative; Metro-Goldwyn-Mayer; The Jackal Group; Cinesite Studios; Nitrogen Studios; United Artists Releasing (USA/Canada); Universal Pictures (International)	Co-composed with Mychael Danna

==== 2020s ====
Year	Title	Director	Studio(s)	Notes
2020	Onward	Dan Scanlon	Walt Disney Pictures; Pixar Animation Studios	Co-composed with Mychael Danna
2021	Trollhunters: Rise of the Titans	Johane Matte; Francisco Ruiz Velasco; Andrew Schmidt	Netflix; NBCUniversal Syndication Studios; Double Dare You Productions; DreamWorks Animation Television	—N/a
2021	The Addams Family 2	Conrad Vernon; Greg Tiernan	Bron Creative; Metro-Goldwyn-Mayer; Cinesite Studios; Nitrogen Studios; The Jackal Group; Glickmania; United Artists Releasing (USA); Universal Pictures (International)	Co-composed with Mychael Danna
2022	My Father's Dragon	Nora Twomey	Netflix; Netflix Animation; Mockingbird Pictures; Cartoon Saloon	Co-composed with Mychael Danna
2026	Flavia	Bharat Nalluri	Sky Cinema; Sky Original Films; Pigasus Pictures; Zephyr Films; Mystic Point Productions; The Mazur Kaplan Company	Co-composed with Mychael Danna

=== Television ===
==== Television films ====
Year	Title	Director	Studio(s)	Notes
1992	Kung Fu: The Legend Continues	Jud Taylor	Warner Bros. Television	—N/a
1998	My Own Country	Mira Nair	Sullivan Entertainment	—N/a
2000	Baby	Robert Allan Ackerman	Sarabande Productions; TNT	—N/a
2002	The Matthew Shepard Story	Roger Spottiswoode	NBC	Co-composed with Mychael Danna
2003	Mafia Doctor	Alex Chapple	CBS; Carlton America; Michele Brustin Productions	—N/a
2003	Miss Spider's Sunny Patch Kids	Mike Fallows	Nelvana Metro-Goldwyn-Mayer	—N/a
2007	Disney Princess Enchanted Tales: Follow Your Dreams	David Block	Walt Disney Studios Home Entertainment; DisneyToon Studios	—N/a

==== Television series ====
Year	Title	Creator(s)	Studio(s)	Notes
1993-1996	Kung Fu: The Legend Continues	Ed Spielman	Warner Bros. Television	—N/a
1991-1993	Tropical Heat	Sam Egan	CBS	—N/a
1996-1997	Beverly Hills, 90210	Darren Star	Propaganda Films (seasons 1-2); Spelling Television; Torand Productions	—N/a
2001	So Weird	Tom J. Astle	Sugar Entertainment, Ltd. (seasons 1–2); No Equal Entertainment, Inc. (season 3); Fair Dinkum Productions	1 episode, "Thinkin' About Tomorrow"
2003	Kid Notorious	Brett Morgen; Robert Evans; Alan R. Cohen; Alan Freedland	Alan & Alan Productions; Six Point Harness	Theme by
2004-2006	Miss Spider's Sunny Patch Friends	David Kirk	Callaway Arts & Entertainment; AbsoluteDigital Pictures; Nelvana	—N/a
2005	The Zula Patrol	Deb M. Manchester	Gotham Entertainment (season 1); Kambooteron Productions (season 1); The Hatchery; Zula USA; UNC-TV; Marvista Entertainment (season 2-3; uncredited)	—N/a
2007	Nimrod Nation	Matthew Akers; Jeff Fisher; Erica Forstadt; Christo Garcia; Todd Lubin; Benjamin Wolf	SundanceTV	—N/a
2008	Independent Lens	Brett Morgen	Independent Television Service	Episode: "Chicago 10" (Season 10, Episode 1)
2010	30 for 30	Bill Simmons; Connor Schell	ESPN Films	—N/a
2010-2011	Babar and the Adventures of Badou	Michael Stokes	Nelvana Limited; TeamTO; LuxAnimation (seasons 1 & 2 only); The Clifford Ross Company	—N/a
2011	Camelot	Michael Hirst; Chris Chibnall	KA Television Productions; Take 5 Productions; Octagon Films; Ecosse Films; GK-TV; Starz Entertainment	Co-composed with Mychael Danna
2012-2014	Continuum	Simon Barry	Reunion Pictures; Thunderbird Reunion Pictures; Boy Meets Girl Film Company; Shaw Media; GK-tv	—N/a
2014-2016	Tyrant	Gideon Raff	20th Television; Teakwood Lane Productions; Keshet Broadcasting; FX Productions (2014–15)	Co-composed with Mychael Danna
2017	Alias Grace	Mary Harron; Sarah Polley; Margaret Atwood (based on the novel by)	—N/a	Co-composed with Mychael Danna
2019	3Below: Tales of Arcadia	Guillermo del Toro	Double Dare You Productions; DreamWorks Animation Television	—N/a
2020	Wizards: Tales of Arcadia	Guillermo del Toro; Marc Guggenheim; Aaron Waltke; Chad Quandt	Double Dare You Productions; DreamWorks Animation Television	—N/a
2022	Julia	Daniel Goldfarb	3 Arts Entertainment; Modern O Productions, INC. Mad Ben Productions; Lionsgate Television	—N/a
2024	Churchill at War	Malcolm Venville; Ron Howard; Sara Enright	Netflix; Imagine Documentaries	—N/a
2025	The Hunting Wives	Rebecca Cutter	Netflix; 3 Arts Entertainment; Lionsgate Television	

=== Video games ===
- Trollhunters: Defenders of Arcadia (2020)

== Awards and nominations ==
Association	Year	Work	Category	Result	Notes	Ref.
Primetime Emmy Awards	2018	Alias Grace: Part 1	Outstanding Music Composition for a Limited Series, Movie or Special (Original Dramatic Score)	Nominated	Shared with Mychael Danna	
Primetime Emmy Awards	2015	Tyrant	Outstanding Music Composition for a Series (Original Dramatic Score)	Nominated	Shared with Mychael Danna	
Primetime Emmy Awards	2015	Tyrant	Outstanding Original Main Title Theme Music	Nominated	Shared with Mychael Danna	
Primetime Emmy Awards	2011	Camelot	Outstanding Original Main Title Theme Music	Nominated	Shared with Mychael Danna	
Annecy International Animated Film Festival	2018	The Breadwinner	Best Original Music for a Feature Film	Won	Shared with Mychael Danna	
Annie Awards	2021	Onward	Outstanding Achievement for Music in an Animated Feature	Nominated	Shared with Mychael Danna	
Annie Awards	2018	The Breadwinner	Outstanding Achievement for Music in an Animated Feature	Nominated	Shared with Mychael Danna	
Annie Awards	2016	The Good Dinosaur	Outstanding Achievement for Music in an Animated Feature	Nominated	Shared with Mychael Danna	
BMI Film & TV Awards	2022	The Addams Family 2	Film Music	Won	Shared with Mychael Danna	
BMI Film & TV Awards	2020	Onward	Film Music	Won	Shared with Mychael Danna	
BMI Film & TV Awards	2020	The Addams Family	Film Music	Won	Shared with Mychael Danna	
BMI Film & TV Awards	2017	Storks	Film Music	Won	Shared with Mychael Danna	
BMI Film & TV Awards	2016	The Good Dinosaur	Film Music	Won	Shared with Mychael Danna	
Canadian Screen Awards	2018	The Breadwinner	Achievement in Music - Original Score	Won	Shared with Mychael Danna	
Canadian Screen Awards	2018	Alias Grace	Best Original Music, Fiction	Nominated	Shared with Mychael Danna	
Canadian Screen Awards	2013	Continuum	Best Original Music Score for a Series	Nominated	For the episode, "A Stitch in Time"	
Fright Meter Awards	2012	Silent Hill: Revelation	Best Score	Nominated	Shared with Akira Yamaoka	
Hollywood Music in Media Awards (HMMA)	2021	The Addams Family 2	Best Original Score - Animated Film	Won	Shared with Mychael Danna	
Hollywood Music in Media Awards (HMMA)	2014	Tyrant	Main Title - TV Show / Digital Series	Won	Shared with Mychael Danna	
International Film Music Critics Award (IFMCA)	2025	Churchill at War	Best Original Score for a Documentary	Nominated	—N/a	
International Film Music Critics Award (IFMCA)	2021	Onward	Best Original Score for an Animated Film	Nominated	Shared with Mychael Danna	
International Film Music Critics Award (IFMCA)	2018	Alias Grace	Best Original Score for Television	Nominated	Shared with Mychael Danna	
International Film Music Critics Award (IFMCA)	2016	The Good Dinosaur	Best Original Score for an Animated Film	Nominated	Shared with Mychael Danna	
International Film Music Critics Award (IFMCA)	2010	The Imaginarium of Doctor Parnassus	Best Original Score for a Fantasy/Science Fiction Film	Nominated	Shared with Mychael Danna	
SOCAN Awards	2018	Storks	International Film Music Award	Won	Shared with Mychael Danna	
SOCAN Awards	2018	Storks	Achievement in Feature Film Music	Won	Shared with Mychael Danna	
SOCAN Awards	2018	The Good Dinosaur	International Film Music Award	Won	Shared with Mychael Danna	
SOCAN Awards	2016	The Good Dinosaur	Achievement in Feature Film Music	Won	Shared with Mychael Danna	
SOCAN Awards	2016	The Good Dinosaur	Domestic Feature Film Award	Won	Shared with Mychael Danna	
SOCAN Awards	2015	Erased	Domestic Feature Film Award	Won	—N/a	
SOCAN Awards	2011	The Imaginarium of Doctor Parnassus	International Film Music Award	Won	Shared with Mychael Danna	
SOCAN Awards	2009	Resident Evil: Apocalypse	International Film Music Award	Won	—N/a	
SOCAN Awards	2008	Resident Evil: Apocalypse	International Film Music Award	Won	—N/a	
SOCAN Awards	2008	Fracture	Domestic Feature Film Award	Won	Shared with Mychael Danna	
SOCAN Awards	2007	Resident Evil: Apocalypse	International Film Music Award	Won	—N/a	
SOCAN Awards	2006	Resident Evil: Apocalypse	International Film Music Award	Won	—N/a	
