= Charlie Saxton =

American film, television, and voice actor

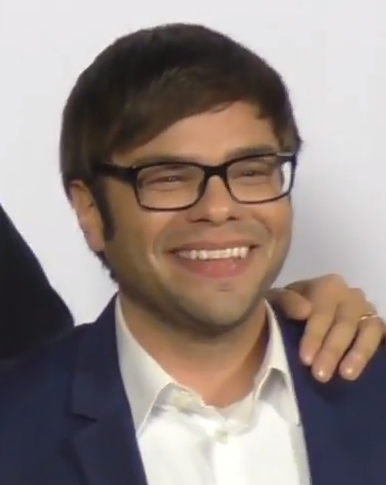
- Saxton in 2016
- Born: Charles Saxton; Bristol, Pennsylvania, U.S.
- Occupations: Actor, voice actor
- Years active: 1998–present

Charles Saxton (born November 7, 1989) is an American film, television, theater, and voice actor.

He had a supporting role as Bug, one of the band members, in Bandslam. He was featured in Hung, an HBO comedy-drama series, playing the son of Thomas Jane's main character. He also provided the voice of Melvin in the video game Bully. He is the voice of Toby in Guillermo del Toro's animated series, Trollhunters.

Saxton co-wrote and co-produced an independent film, Art of a Hit, with his Bandslam co-star Gaelan Draper in 2024.

Saxton also portrays the wrestler "Lone Wolf" in The Wonder Years music video for "Melrose Diner".

Currently Saxton is a member of My Chemical Romance's Long Live the Black Parade Tour ensemble, performing as the Clerk and the Clown on stage.

== Early life and career ==
Saxton began acting in commercials as a child, after being scouted at an audition he'd accompanied his older sister to. Shortly thereafter, both Charlie and his sister began performing with their local theater company.

On his introduction to acting, Saxton has said: "My mother is an actress and my dad was a stage manager in Delaware, so I was sort of born into this whole society. When they asked me if I wanted to act, I said yes, so I could get out of school quickly."

In 2003, Saxton made his Broadway debut in the revival of Cat on a Hot Tin Roof. A decade later in 2013 he starred in an Off-Broadway production of A Family for All Occasions, directed by Phillip Seymour Hoffman.

== Filmography ==
=== Film ===
Year	Title	Role	Notes
1998	Pants on Fire	Stephen	
2003	Mail Order Bride	Young Tommy	
2004	Billy and the Kid	Punk Rock Kid	Short
2005	Delirium and the Dollman	Jer	Short
2005	Rounding First	Short Bully	
2008	The Happening	Student Named Dylan	
2009	Bandslam	Bug	
2009	The Lovely Bones	Ronald Drake	Uncredited
2010	Twelve	Mark Rothko	
2011	From Up on Poppy Hill	Shiro Mizunuma (voice)	
2012	I Am Ben	Drewbird	Short; Also producer
2012	Shower	Johnny	Short
2013	Movie 43	Jay	Nominated – Golden Raspberry Award for Worst Screen Combo (shared with the entire cast)
2013	The English Teacher	Will	
2013	Pike and Bird	James	Short
2015	The Comments	Jacob	Short
2016	All for Nikki	Zach Steadman	
2021	The Little Things	Felix	
2021	Trollhunters: Rise of the Titans	Toby Domzalski (voice)	
2024	Art of a Hit	Charlie	Film was co-written and co-produced by Saxton and Gaelan Connell.

=== Television ===
Year	Title	Role	Notes
2009–11	Hung	Damon Drecker	30 episodes
2010	Badges	Pete Moss	Television Movie
2011	CollegeHumor Originals	Myles Drecker	1 episode
2011	Big Morning Buzz Live	Himself	1 episode
2011–13	Workaholics	Jerry Jaeger	2 episodes
2012	NTSF:SD:SUV::	Gembo	1 episode
2012	New Girl	Chaz	1 episode
2012	The Flipside	Unknown	1 episode
2013–14	Betas	Mitchell	11 episodes
2015	Silicon Valley	Crushing Applicant	1 episode
2015–2019	Hawaii Five-0	Ricky Schiff	2 episodes
2016	Young & Hungry	Randall	1 episode
2016	Cooper Barrett's Guide to Surviving Life	Neal Fissley	13 episodes
2016–18	Trollhunters: Tales of Arcadia	Toby Domzalski (voice)	52 episodes
2017	Bones	Kirby Lee	1 episode
2018–19	3Below: Tales of Arcadia	Toby Domzalski (voice)	18 episodes
2020	Harvey Street Kids	Feel Thulhu (voice)	1 episode
2020	Wizards: Tales of Arcadia	Toby Domzalski (voice)	4 episodes
2022	The Recruit	Daniel “Danny” Woodrow	1 episode

=== Video games ===
Year	Title	Role	Notes
2006	Bully	Melvin (voice)	
2020	Trollhunters: Defenders of Arcadia	Toby Domzalski (voice)	
