= Trollhunters: Defenders of Arcadia =

2020 video game

- Developer: WayForward
- Publisher: Outright Games
- Director: Rob Buchanan
- Producer: David White
- Designers: Rob Buchanan; Angel Dorantes; Bannon Rudis; Xander Hogan; Jordan Lange
- Programmer: Timothy Peterson
- Artists: Rob Buchanan; Elijah Brown
- Writer: Rob Buchanan
- Composers: Tim Davies; Jeff Danna
- Engine: Unity
- Platforms: Microsoft Windows; Nintendo Switch; PlayStation 4 Xbox One; Google Stadia
- Release: Windows, Switch, PS4, Xbox One; September 25, 2020; Stadia; January 25, 2022
- Genre: Action
- Modes: Single-player, multiplayer

Trollhunters: Defenders of Arcadia is a video game based on the television series Trollhunters: Tales of Arcadia. It was released for Microsoft Windows, Nintendo Switch, PlayStation 4, and Xbox One on September 25, 2020, and for Google Stadia on January 25, 2022. It was developed by WayForward and published by Outright Games, with physical European distribution handled through Bandai Namco Entertainment.

== Gameplay ==
Trollhunters: Defenders of Arcadia is a side-scrolling action-platformer in which players control Jim Lake Jr. or Claire Nuñez to prevent the Time-pocalypse. Players also collect artifacts, level up armor and fight fantasy creatures (trolls, dragons and goblins).

== Cast ==
- Emile Hirsch as Jim Lake Jr.
- David Bradley as Merlin
- Lexi Medrano as Claire
- Charlie Saxton as Toby Domzalski
- Colin O'Donoghue as Douxie
- Tatiana Maslany as Aja
- Sebastian Lopez Hinton as Krel, Misc Voices
- Ike Amadi as Angor Rot
- Yvonne Angulo as Morgana
- Brook Chalmers as Porgon, Misc Voices
- Fred Tatasciore as AAARRRGGHH!!!, Gunmar, Blinky, Bagdwella, Vendel
- Tom Kenny as Gut, NotEnrique, Gnomes
