= Trollhunters: Rise of the Titans =

2021 film written by Guillermo del Toro

- Official release poster
- Directed by: Johane Matte; Francisco Ruiz Velasco; Andrew Schmidt
- Written by: Guillermo del Toro; Marc Guggenheim; Dan Hageman; Kevin Hageman
- Based on: Tales of Arcadia by Guillermo del Toro; Daniel Kraus
- Produced by: Guillermo del Toro; Chad Hammes; Marc Guggenheim; Dan Hageman; Kevin Hageman
- Starring: Emile Hirsch; Lexi Medrano; Charlie Saxton; Fred Tatasciore; Diego Luna; Tatiana Maslany; Nick Offerman; Colin O'Donoghue; Alfred Molina; Steven Yeun; Cole Sand; James Hong; Kelsey Grammer
- Cinematography: Tak Fujimoto
- Edited by: John Laus
- Music by: Jeff Danna; Scott Kirkland
- Production companies: DreamWorks Animation (Note: Credited and produced as DreamWorks Animation Television.); Double Dare You Productions
- Distributed by: Netflix
- Release date: July 21, 2021
- Running time: 105 minutes
- Country: United States
- Language: English

Trollhunters: Rise of the Titans is a 2021 American animated science fantasy action film directed by Johane Matte, Francisco Ruiz Velasco, and Andrew Schmidt, and written by Guillermo del Toro, Marc Guggenheim and Dan and Kevin Hageman (who also produced the film). It is the finale of the Tales of Arcadia franchise by Guillermo del Toro, which features the television series Trollhunters, 3Below and Wizards. A year after the events of Wizards, the Guardians of Arcadia reunite for the final time as they battle the nefarious Arcane Order, who have reawakened the primordial Titans.

The film was released on Netflix on July 21, 2021, with positive critical reception.

== Plot ==
A year after their battle with the Arcane Order, (Note: As depicted in the Wizards episode Our Final Act (2020)) master wizard Hisirdoux "Douxie" Casperan and former Arcane Order member Nari lure their pursuers Belloc and Skrael onto a moving subway train, where they launch a surprise attack with former Trollhunter Jim Lake Jr. and his girlfriend Claire Nunez. Jim is wounded during the fight while his best friend Toby Domzaski accidentally snaps the train's brakes, causing the train to be unable to stop. The subway then breaks out of the station and almost collides into a shop in the city's square, narrowly avoiding the crowd. Then, Belloc and Skreal start a fire, with civilians at risk. They threaten the lives of the bystanders unless Nari comes with them. Douxie swaps bodies with Nari before she is captured by the Arcane Order.

Jim recovers in a newly rebuilt Camelot while learning his mother Barbara is engaged to his former teacher and principal, the changeling Strickler. The group are then joined by Queen Aja Tarron and Eli Pepperjack. Blinky Galadrigal relays what he learned to reveal the Order's plan to awakening the Titans and have them converge at Arcadia Oaks, the center of the universe, to destroy and recreate the world. The Order discovers Douxie's spell and reverts Douxie and Nari to their normal bodies, but not before Nari alerts Jim, "Trollhunter make the ninth configuration, Krohnisfere will make right". The heroes discover that the Arcane Order is already preparing a ritual to break the Genesis Seals, and fail to prevent the ritual from being completed.

The heroes split up: Claire, Blinky, Douxie's familiar Archie, and Archie's father Charlemagne head to the Trollmarket in Hong Kong to acquire the Krohnisfere from the TrollDragon Zong-Shi. Krel Taron leads Stuart, Steve, and Eli to retrieve Excalibur, while the rest split into two teams in an attempt to stop the titans of Skreal and a brainwashed Nari. Nomura's team goes to Brazil while Strickler's team heads to Greenland. Strickler and his fellow changeling Nomura are killed in battle; Claire's team manages to acquire the Krohnisfere, but are forced to leave Archie and his father behind when Belloc's titan destroys the bridge. The heroes reunite and Douxie restores Nari's free will. When asked of the Krohnisfere, Nari tells Jim that "Time unfolds differently, like a flower. Only the Trollhunter will know" before using her Titan to battle and kill Skrael in his Titan, killing herself as well.

As Belloc's titan continues its advance, Douxie realizes the Titans are meant to join with a Heartstone and that the union of Trollmarket's Heartstone and Bellroc's Titan will cause the world to be reborn in fire. The group arrive ahead of Belloc while Jim realizes that the ninth configuration is meant to represent him and his friends, enabling Jim to finally pull Excalibur out of the stone. The heroes confront Bellroc, who proves to be too powerful for them to handle. As Jim is left alone to face Bellroc, he comes to accept that the amulet never made him a hero and he already was one. Jim's newly improved amulet flies towards him, giving him a magic/Akiridion armor which can empower Excalibur with greater power. Toby, after remembering the anti-magic radiation generator from their first encounter with the Arcane Order, uses it on Bellroc, giving Jim the opportunity to strike Bellroc with Excalibur. Jim finds a fatally injured Toby, who has been crushed by debris and thanks his friends in his final moments with remaining eight heroes left to mourn him.

Remembering Nari's words and realizing that the Krohnisfere is meant for him to travel back in time and prevent any tragic events that happened to him and his friends, Jim decides to use to return to when he first became the Trollhunter. He gives an emotional farewell and his consciousness and memories travels back to the morning where he found the mystical amulet, (Note: As depicted in the Trollhunters episode Becoming: Part 1 (2016)) making his first change to the timeline by having Toby find Merlin's amulet under the canals.

== Cast ==
- Emile Hirsch as James "Jim" Lake Jr.
- Lexi Medrano as Claire Nuñez
- Charlie Saxton as Tobias "Toby" Domzalski
- Kelsey Grammer as Blinky Galadrigal
- Fred Tatasciore as AAARRRGGHH!!!
- Colin O'Donoghue as Hisirdoux "Douxie" Casperan
- Diego Luna as Prince Krel Tarron
- Tatiana Maslany as Queen Aja Tarron
- Steven Yeun as Steve Palchuk
- Cole Sand as Eli Pepperjack
- Alfred Molina as Archie
- Nick Frost as Stuart
- Amy Landecker as Barbara Lake
- Jonathan Hyde as Walter Strickler
- Lauren Tom as Nomura
- Nick Offerman as Varvatos Vex
- Piotr Michael as Bellroc (Male voice) and Skrael
- Kay Bess as Bellroc (Female voice)
- Angel Lin as Nari
- Cheryl Hines as Lucy Blank/Momblank
- Tom Kenny as Ricky Blank/Dadblank
- Tom Wilson as Coach Lawrence
- Bebe Wood as Shannon Longhannon
- Brian Blessed as Charlemagne
- James Hong as Zong-Shi
- Laraine Newman as Ms. Janeth
- Grey Griffin, Stephanie Sheh, Kelly Stables and Frank Welker as additional voices

== Production ==
=== Development ===
While planning the ending of the Netflix/DreamWorks Animation saga Tales of Arcadia, the producers, wanting it to finish with an Avengers-style crossover, debated whether to conclude it with additional Wizards episodes or a feature film, and eventually made a film because a cinematic format allowed them to "tell this story on the scope that [they] wanted and have the story be as big as [they] aspired it to be". Aware that audiences watching the film would not necessarily be familiar with the rest of the saga, a recap prologue was written for the start of the film. The film was also influenced by Marvel Studios' Avengers films, the filmmakers having taken a similar approach so audiences unfamiliar with the franchise could nevertheless enjoy the film's story. According to writer Marc Guggenheim, early production on the film happened while the studio was working on Wizards, which he felt gave the producers time to determine how to finish the saga's story. The writers included references to executive-producer Guillermo del Toro's Pacific Rim, though they were careful not to overload the film with Pacific Rim easter eggs.

On August 7, 2020, it was revealed that Netflix and DreamWorks Animation were developing the Tales of Arcadia finale film, Trollhunters: Rise of the Titans, with Johane Matte, Francisco Ruiz Velasco, and Andrew Schmidt directing, Guillermo del Toro, Marc Guggenheim and the Dan and Kevin Hageman writing and producing the film, with Chad Hammes and Tales of Arcadia creator Guillermo del Toro executive-producing. Emile Hirsch, Lexi Medrano, Charlie Saxton, Kelsey Grammer, Alfred Molina, Steven Yeun, Nick Frost, Colin O'Donoghue, Diego Luna, Tatiana Maslany, Cole Sand, Nick Offerman, Fred Tatasciore, Brian Blessed, Kay Bess, Piotr Michael, James Hong, Tom Kenny, Angel Lin, Amy Landecker, Jonathan Hyde, Bebe Wood, Laraine Newman, and Cheryl Hines were confirmed to be part of the cast of the film.

=== Animation ===
The film was produced with a higher production budget than previous entries in the franchise. Animation was provided by 88 Pictures, CGCG, Inc., and Original Force. The filmmakers choose to start the film with a high speed chase sequence as a way to showcase the higher budget and animation quality to the audience.

=== Music ===
Trollhunters: Rise of the Titans (Original Motion Picture Soundtrack)

Film score by Jeff Danna and Scott Kirkland
- Released: July 21, 2021
- Recorded: 2021
- Genre: Score
- Label: Back Lot Music

Jeff Danna, who previously composed 3Below and Wizards, and Scott Kirkland composed the score for the film. Dana and Kirkland composed new themes exclusive to the film, while also including themes from the previous Tales of Arcadia series in the score. The soundtrack was released by Back Lot Music on July 21, 2021, coinciding with the film's release.

== Release ==
On August 7, 2020, the film was confirmed to be released in 2021. On April 27, 2021, the release date was revealed to be July 21, 2021. The project marked the first DreamWorks Animation film to be released directly on a streaming service. The movie was released on Netflix on July 21, 2021.

== Reception ==
On Rotten Tomatoes it has an 88% rating with an average rating of 6.90/10, based on reviews from 8 critics. Caroline Cao of Den of Geek said that no one apart from Jim receives "a culminating development," and argued that the film "bellows the epicness of a finale" with characters reaffirming "Trollhunters mantras" and praised the film for "notching the stakes and challenging the comfort of our characters," visual effects, imagination, and humor, However, Cao criticized the film for "the sudden insertion of a Chinese-based troll society" with hard-to-overlook "shades of sinophobia" and says that the conclusion of the film goes against other possibilities and questions "all the emotional investment" made across the previous six seasons. Jennifer Green of Common Sense Media gave the film three out of five stars, pointed to "potentially upsetting violence" in the film, including apparent deaths of some characters, and others sacrificing themselves, but praised the film for having heroes which "show courage and teamwork to save the day" and said that fans would be "delighted" by the film. Sarah Moran of Screen Rant said that the film "delivers a strong finale...that doesn't limit the possibility of more to come" and delivers "a dramatic but happy ending...with a unexpected twist."

Rafael Motamayor of IGN said the film "delivers heavy emotions and grand-scale action" while praising it for ending Jim's story in a satisfying way and for huge action scenes. He also criticized it for not giving the huge cast enough time to explore all of their "major developments" by focusing solely on one character (Jim), and says that while the film can be strong for challenging the ideas of destiny and heroism, it has a finale which "may feel like a cop-out conclusion to some." Zachary Guida of Screen Rant argued that it failed to provide "an actual conclusion" to the story of Jim and his friends, inferring that Jim's time travel means that the Tales of Arcadia series are "officially...non-canon". Renaldo Matadeen of CBR argued that the children that Steve has during the film appear to be "nothing more than expendable cogs in a shock factor arc".

=== Accolades ===
Year	Award	Category	Nominee(s)	Result
2022	Annie Awards	Best FX - TV/Media	Greg Lev, Brandon Tyra, Prakash Dcunha, Vincent Chou, Chen Ling	Nominated
2022	Annie Awards	Best Voice Acting - TV/Media	Charlie Saxton as the voice of Toby Domzalski	Nominated
2022	Children's and Family Emmy Awards	Outstanding Special Class Animated Program	Trollhunters: Rise of the Titans	Nominated
2022	Children's and Family Emmy Awards	Outstanding Sound Editing and Sound Mixing for an Animated Program	Trollhunters: Rise of the Titans	Nominated

== Future ==
Following the release of Trollhunters: Rise of the Titans, writer Marc Guggenheim said the film is meant to "wrap up the trilogy and for this really to be the final chapter in the story", but that it simultaneously "also opens the door for a whole host of new storytelling possibilities", and that it was "designed to be a cap, and [he suspects] it will remain that way for at least a little bit".
