= 2025 Annecy International Animation Film Festival =

2025 film festival

- Official poster by Raman Djafari
- Opening film: 9 Million Colours; Carcassonne-Acapulco; La Vie avec un Idiot; Black; The Girl Who Cried Pearls
- Location: Annecy, France
- Awards: Cristal for Best Feature Film: Arco; Contrechamp Grand Prix: Endless Cookie
- Festival date: 8–14 June 2025

Annecy International Animation Film Festival
- 2026 2024

The 2025 Annecy International Animation Film Festival took place from 8 to 14 June 2025, in Annecy, France. Unlike previous editions, the festival opened with the world premiere of a selection of five shorts instead of a single feature-length film. These short films were: 9 Million Colours by Bára Anna; Carcassonne-Acapulco by Marjorie Caup & Olivier Heraud; La Vie avec un Idiot by Theodore Ushev; "Black" (from the anthology series Star Wars: Visions) by Shinya Ohira; and The Girl Who Cried Pearls by Chris Lavis & Maciek Sczcerbowski.

French film Arco, directed by Ugo Bienvenu, won the Cristal for Best Feature Film, while Canadian film Endless Cookie, directed by Seth Scriver and Peter Scriver, received the Contrechamp Grand Prix.

== Background ==
The year's complete Annecy International Animation Film Festival lineup was announced on 23 April 2025. Alongside the films for each section, special presentations of upcoming projects were also announced. These include works from various film studios such as Sony Pictures Animation (Tyree Dillihay's Goat), DreamWorks (Pierre Perifel's The Bad Guys 2), Paramount (Derek Drymon's The SpongeBob Movie: Search for SquarePants and Chris Miller's Smurfs), Netflix (Stranger Things animated series, Alex Woo's In Your Dreams and Raphael Bob-Waksberg series Long Story Short), Disney (Jared Bush and Byron Howard's Zootopia 2), Pixar (Madeline Sharafian and Domee Shi's Elio), Warner Bros. Animation (Smiling Friends season 3), and Rocketsheep Studio (Avid Liongoren's Zsazsa Zaturnnah).

Three recipients for the Honorary Cristal Lifetime Achievement Award were announced: American producer and animator Matt Groening, Academy Award-winning French filmmaker Michel Gondry, and English director and animator Joanna Quinn. Groening, creator of both animated sitcoms The Simpsons and Futurama, presented an exclusive screening event of the former series alongside executive producer and showrunner Matt Selman and consulting producer David Silverman, while Gondry presented his first fully-animated film Maya, Give Me a Title. Quinn dedicated her award to the Palestinian animator Haneen Koraz, who produces animations with children in the Gaza Strip.

For this year's edition, Hungarian animation was chosen to be highlighted with the screening of multiple films including the Cristal Award for Best Feature Film winners Heroic Times by József Gémes (1985) and The District! by Áron Gauder (2004). The festival's poster, designed by illustrator and animator Raman Djafari, draws inspiration from Hungarian folk art and Kalocsa embroidery, using floral motifs as well as the colors in the Hungarian flag.

== Sections ==
The films selected for each section are as follows:

=== Official competition ===
==== Feature films ====
English title	Original title	Director(s)	Production countrie(s)
A Magnificent Life	Marcel et Monsieur Pagnol	Sylvain Chomet	France, Luxembourg, Belgium
Allah Is Not Obliged	Allah n'est pas obligé	Zaven Najjar	Belgium, Canada, France, Luxembourg
Arco		Ugo Bienvenu	France, United Kingdom, United States
ChaO		Yasuhiro Aoki	Japan
Dandelion's Odyssey	Planètes	Momoko Seto	Belgium, France
Death Does Not Exist	La mort n'existe pas	Félix Dufour-Laperrière	Canada, France
Into the Mortal World	落凡尘	Zhong Ding	China
Little Amélie or the Character of Rain	Amélie et la métaphysique des tubes	Maïlys Vallade, Liane-Cho Han	France, Belgium
Olivia and the Invisible Earthquake	L'Olívia i el terratrèmol invisible	Irene Iborra	Belgium, Chile, Spain, France
The Last Blossom	ホウセンカ	Baku Kinoshita	Japan

==== Contrechamp ====
English title	Original title	Director(s)	Production countrie(s)
Balentes		Giovanni Columbu	Italy
Endless Cookie		Seth Scriver, Peter Scriver	Canada
Jinsei	無名の人生	Ryuya Suzuki	Japan
Lesbian Space Princess		Emma Hough Hobbs, Leela Varghese	Australia
Memory Hotel		Heinrich Sabl	Germany, France
Nimuendajú		Tania Cristina Anaya	Brazil, Peru
Olivia & the Clouds	Olivia & Las Nubes	Tomás Pichardo Espaillat	Dominican Republic
Space Cadet		Eric San	Canada
Tales from the Magic Garden		David Sukup, Patrick Pašš, Leon Vidmar, Jean-Claude Rozec	Czech Republic, France, Slovakia, Slovenia
The Great History of Western Philosophy	La gran historia de la filosofía occidental	Aria Covamonas	Mexico
The Square	광장	Kim Bo-sol	South Korea

==== Short films ====
English title	Original title	Director(s)	Production countrie(s)
9 Million Colours (opening film)	9 milionů barev	Bára Anna	Czech Republic, Norway, Germany
At Night		Pooya Afzali	Iran
Atomik Tour		Bruno Collet	France, Czech Republic
Bread Will Walk		Alex Boya	Canada
Carcassonne-Acapulco (opening film)		Marjorie Caup, Olivier Heraud	France
Dog Ear		Péter Vácz	Hungary
Dollhouse Elephant		Jenny Jokela	Finland
Fusion		Richard Reeves	Canada
Hairy Legs		Andrea Dorfman	Canada
Hatker		Alejandro Ariel Martin	Argentina
Il Burattino e la Balena		Roberto Catani	France, Italy
La Vie avec un Idiot (opening film)		Theodore Ushev	France
Les Bêtes		Michael Granberry	United States
Luna Rossa		Priit Pärn, Olga Pärn	Estonia, France
Murmuration	Zwermen	Janneke Swinkels, Tim Frihsinger	Netherlands, Belgium
My Brother, My Brother		Abdelrahman Dnewar, Saad Dnewar	Egypt, France, Germany
My Wonderful Life		Calleen Koh	Singapore
Ordinary Life	普通の生活	Yoriko Mizushiri	France, Japan
Ovary-Acting		Ida Melum	Norway, Sweden, United Kingdom
Sappho	Safo	Rosana Urbes	Brazil
Shadows		Rand Beiruty	France, Jordan
Shocking Dreams in the Circus	马戏团枭雄	Sun Xun	China
Signal		Emma Carré, Mathilde Parquet	France, Belgium
Sisowath Quay	Quai Sisowath	Stéphanie Lansaque, François Leroy	France
Stampfer Dreams		Thomas Renoldner	Austria
Star Wars: Visions: "Black" (opening film)		Shinya Ohira	Japan
Sulaimani		Vinnie Ann Bose	France
Tapeworm Alexis & the Opera Diva		Thaïs Odermatt	Switzerland
Thank You Dr. Farsi		Samaneh Shojaei	Iran
The Exploding Girl	La fille qui explose	Caroline Poggi, Jonathan Vinel	France
The Girl Who Cried Pearls (opening film)	La jeune fille qui pleurait des perles	Chris Lavis, Maciek Szczerbowski	Canada
The Gnawer of Rocks	Mangittatuarjuk	Louise Flaherty	Canada
The Magician	Magicianul	Bogdan Mureşanu	Croatia, France, Romania
The Night Boots	Les Bottes de la nuit	Pierre-Luc Granjon	France
The Pool or Death of a Goldfish		Daria Kopiec	Poland

==== Television Films ====
English title	Episode	Director(s)	Production countrie(s)
An Almost Christmas Story		David Lowery	United States
Anne Shirley		Hiroshi Kawamata	Japan
Anselmo Wannabe	"The Architect"	Massimo Ottoni	Italy
Astérix & Obélix, le Combat des chefs	"Episode 102"	Alain Chabat, Fabrice Joubert	France
Baby Bot's Backyard Tales	"Where's Billy?"	Markus Vad Flaaten	Spain
The Big Lizard		Amaël Isnard, Jeanne Meister	Belgium, France, United Kingdom
Christo The Civilized Barbarian	"Hunting Party"	Shaddy Safadi	United States
Common Side Effects	"Episode 9"	Vincent Tsui	United States
Devil May Cry	"The First Circle"	Han Cheong II	United States
Firsts	"Junko Tabei"	Bambú Orellana, Paloma Mora	Chile, Spain
Freaked Out	"Major Decision"	Théo Grosjean, Mothy Richard	Belgium, France
Goat Girl	"I Ain't Afraid of No Goat"	Krystal Georgiou, Matthieu Giner, Lauri Saunders	Belgium, France, Ireland
Guard Dog & Bill Plympton in Brazil	"Lost in Iguazu"	Cesar Cabral	Brazil
Il est une fois		Patrick Volve	France
In Search of the Star Vegetable	"Boris and His Drum"	Loisette Ratsivahiny	Madagascar, Switzerland
Jeremy Super Caribou	"Jeremy's Fast Delivery Service"	Mathieu Auvray, Pauline Pinson	France, Belgium
Kiff	"Kiff Is Good at Sports"	Allison Craig	United States
Kippkopp and Tipptopp		Tama Mikori	Hungary
Lena's Farm	"Volles Nest"	Elena Walf	Germany
Max & the Midknights	"Welcome to Byjovia"	David Skelly, Chris Perry	United States
Metallic Rouge		Motonobu Hori	Japan
Pucio	"Pucio and the Crocodile"	Marta Strozycka	Poland
Star Wars: Tales of the Empire	"Devoted"	Dave Filoni	United States
Stories from Backwoods		Leevi Lemmetty	Ireland, Finland
Tales from Outer Suburbia	"Distant Rain"	Noel Cleary, Shaun Tan	Australia
The Ruins of Kunlun Linglong		Jiajia Huai	China
The Upside Down River		Paul Leluc	France
Tiddler		Andy Martin, Alex Bain	United Kingdom
Tiny Toot	"Mushroom Magic"	Maria Mac Dalland	Denmark
Zombie Safari	"We Will Be Animals"	Jerrold Chong, Joanne Lin	Singapore

==== Commissioned Films ====
Title	Director(s)	Production countrie(s)
Absolute Doom	Ralph Karam, Santiago Oddis	United States
Animateka Festival 2024: "Elephant Trailer"	Jelena Dragutinović, Lene Lekše, Janja Kosi, Andreja Goetz, Brina Lekše, Urszula Domańska	Slovenia
Arnold Turboust: "Les Lettres de Krakovie"	Antoine Dahan, Clement Delaby, Rayan Takhedmit	France
CNESST: "Hanging by a Thread"	Dale Hayward, Pierre Dalpé	Canada
Desi Oon	Suresh Eriyat	India
ENEDIS: "Les Oiseaux"	Jean-Charles Kerninon, Clément Lauricella	France
Get Back	Hyojin Mo, Moonyoung Oh	South Korea
Ichon: "We Must"	Corentin Chauviere, Léo Soulard	France
Melanie Martinez: "Play Date"	Clavel Gris	France
Moving Back Moving Up	Lucile Leroy	France
My Algorithm	Balázs Turai, Benjamin Efrati	France
Naïve New Beaters & Star Feminine Band: "Ye Kuo Si Kuo"	Lola Lefrevre	France
Naruto x Oasis	Matthieu Poirier	France
Need a Good Sleep	Joseph Wallace	United Kingdom
Očima Franze Kafky: Mezi obrazem a jazykem	Hanna Palamarchuk	Czech Republic
Olipop Yeti	Chris Finnegan, Mark Caballero, Seamus Walsh	United States
Pantagruel	Lucia Auge	France
Shadow	Mario Muñoz	Mexico
London International Animation Festival 2024: "Show Your Working"	Isolda Milenkovic	United Kingdom
Sis: "Bow to Your Wilderness"	Danski Tang	United States
South of Midnight	Chris Lavis, Maciek Szczerbowski	Canada
Starpets: "Teaser"	Stéphane Berla	France
StopTrik Festival: "Trailer 2024"	Reinhold Bidner	Austria, Slovenia
The Decameron: "Main Title Sequence"	Katrina Crawford, Mark Bashore	United States
The Eclipse	Laurence Arcadias, Robin Corbet	United States
The Rumor Is Born	Moisés Arancibia	Chile
TED: "Three Sisters - When Ancient Wisdom Beats Modern Industry"	Luisa Holanda	United States
22nd Sommets du cinéma d'animation: "Trailer"	Daniel Gies	Canada
Ubu roi	Romane Tulli Houzet	France
Vanish: "The Bully Monster"	Gabriel Nobrega, Pedro Conti	Brazil
Vinheta CineSesc	Cesar Cabral	Brazil
Vladimir Komarov	Junhee Lee	South Korea
Welcome to the City of Love	FX Goby	United Kingdom
With Letter and Love	Ana Chubinidze	Georgia
Wood You Believe It?	Cadi Catlow	United Kingdom

==== Off-Limits ====
English title	Original title	Director(s)	Production countrie(s)
Capriccio		Gábor Ulrich	Hungary
Coda		Thor Sivertsen	Norway
Firewalk		Pink Twins	Finland
Gerhard		Ulu Braun	Germany
SKRFF		Corrie Francis Parks, Daniel Nuderscher	Austria
The Graffiti	Rakugaki	Ryo Orikasa	Japan
The Prologue		Marzieh Emadi, Sina Saadat	Austria
This Is Not Your Garden	Este no es tu jardín	Carlos Velandia	Colombia
Vader Ademt		Juliette Pons	Belgium

==== Perspectives ====
English title	Original title	Director(s)	Production countrie(s)
All This Death		Fadi Syriani	Lebanon, Germany
Blinded by the Lights		Francis Y. Brown	Ghana
Bloody Mess		Megan Wennberg	Canada
Box		Tingyi Zhou, Yafei Xie, Yuanjia Huang	China
By the Way	Nagofteh Namanad	Mahboobeh Kalaee, Ali Fotoohi	Iran
Chronicity	Kronicitet	Aleta Rajič	Bornia and Herzegovina
Dark Orange		Zahra Azadpour	Iran
Ancestor	Dédé	Yasmine Djedje-Fisher-Azoume	United Kingdom
Fačuk		Maida Srabovic	Croatia, Slovenia
Goldau		Roman Kälin	Switzerland
Ibuka, Justice		Justice Rutikara	Canada
K'uchu: A Childhood Place	K'uchu: Rincón de la infancia	Alessio del Pozo	Peru
Psychonauts		Niko Radas	Croatia
S the Wolf		Sameh Alaa	France
Silent Cinema		Krste Gospodinovski	Macedonia, Romania
Snake Soup		Zack Demirtshyan	Armenia
The Mustached Clown Circus	El circo de los payasos bigotones	Ana Comes, Tomas Alzogaray Vanella, Paz Bloj	Argentina

==== Young Audiences ====
English title	Original title	Director(s)	Production countrie(s)
A Walk into the Afterlife		Jiyun Jeong	Luxembourg
Capybaras	Los Carpinchos	Alfredo Soderguit	Chile, France, Uruguay
Cardboard		Jean-Philippe Vine	United Kingdom
Forevergreen		Nathan Engelhardt, Jeremy Spears	United States
Sapan		Kerem Yoruk, Yasir Atis	Turkey
Snow Bear		Aaron Blaise	United States
The Carp and the Child	La Carpe et l'Enfant	Morgane Simon, Arnaud Demuynck	Belgium, France
The Great Annual Party of the Creatures of the Moon	Le Grand Party annuel des créatures de la Lune	Francis Desharnais	Canada
The Night Tunnel	Le Tunnel de la nuit	Annechien Strouven	Belgium, France, Netherlands
Tsuru		Pedro Anias	Brazil

==== Graduation Films ====
English title	Original title	Director(s)	Production countrie(s)	Institution(s)
A Bird Hit My Window and Now I'm a Lesbian		AJ Dubler, Carmela Murphy	United States	School of the Art Institute of Chicago
The Doll Kiln		Wenwen Zhu	United States	School of the Art Institute of Chicago
Arachnophobia	Arahnofobija	Melita Sandrin	Slovenia	University of Nova Gorica
Better Man	Lepší člověk	Eliška Jirásková	Czech Republic	Film and TV School of the Academy of Performing Arts in Prague
Between the Gaps	Entre les jours	Martin Bonnin	France	La Poudrière
Blargh		Sofjia Zivkovic	Germany	Film Academy Baden-Württemberg
Detlev		Ferdinand Ehrhardt	Germany	Film Academy Baden-Württemberg
Casual	En jeg ser	Kauli Green	Denmark	National Film School of Denmark
Chair Cemetery	Toute portes ouvertes	Alicia Levy	France	Lycée René Descartes
Cleanliness	Tīrība	Andrejs Brīvulis	Latvia	Art Academy of Latvia
Closed-Circuit Television (CCTV)		Jaehyeok Lee	South Korea	Hansung University
Cocoon		Yiwei Chen	China, United Kingdom	Royal College of Art
The Eating of an Orange		May Kindred-Boothby	United Kingdom	Royal College of Art
Cottage Cheese		Janina Müller, Liina Luomajoki, Lena Metzger, Alice Kunz	Switzerland	Lucerne University of Applied Sciences and Arts
Flares	Paprsky	Jáchym Bouzek	Czech Republic, France	École nationale supérieure des arts décoratifs
Pebble to Pebble	De caillou à caillou	Charlotte Annereau	France	École nationale supérieure des arts décoratifs
Floating		Jelena Milunovic	Croatia, Germany, Serbia	Konrad Wolf Film University of Babelsberg
Zootrope		Léna Martinez	France	École nationale supérieure des arts décoratifs
Football Stuff	Cosas de fútbol	Alejandro Ara Alonso, Matilde Chicharro Randet, Yuu Cortés Maicas, Layla Díaz Pérez, Sara García Jiménez, Marta Iglesias Martín, Carla Muñoz Ramírez	Spain	Escuela de Arte de Huesca
Hand		Jing Wang	Japan	Musashino Art University
Hello, Headquarters	Halo, Centrala	Zuzanna Heller	Poland	Łódź Film School
The Crooked Heads	Na krzywe łby	Jakub Krzyszpin	Poland	Łódź Film School
Hunting	Qui part à la chasse	Lea Favre	Switzerland	École cantonale d'art de Lausanne
Laute Stille		Lisa Bayr, Katharina Arbeithuber, Leo Roithner	Austria	University of Applied Arts Vienna
Lights, Haze		Tata Managadze	Belgium, Finland, Georgia, Portugal	RE:ANIMA
me*	私は、私と、私が、私を	Rina Ito	Japan	Tokyo Zokei University
Mother's Child		Naomi Noir	Netherlands	Utrecht School of the Arts
Neh Neh Pok		Jaime NG	Singapore	Nanyang Technological University
Passageways	Voies de passage	Geneviève Tremblay, Milla Cummings	Canada	Université Laval
Pillow Talks		Amandine Vautrin	Belgium	La Cambre
Poppy Flowers		Evridiki Papaiakovou	Estonia	Estonian Academy of Arts
The Diffusion Pilot		Aurelijus Čiupas	Estonia	Estonian Academy of Arts
Q		Masataka Kihara	Japan	Tama Art University
REM Sleep	REM Slaap	Husam Zakaraya	Netherlands	ArtEZ University of Arts
Secret Theatre	Teatro Secreto	Diego Martínez	Mexico	Taller del Chucho
Sphere Supreme		Hasan Pastaci	Belgium, Turkey	Royal Academy of Fine Arts (KASK)
Sublime		Marie Heribel, Candice Yernaux, Juliette Buysschaert, Camille Leroy, Joséphine Vendeville, Martin Laurent, Lucas Foutrier	France	Piktura, L'École de l'image
The Angelic Touch	Un tocco angelico	Nicole Golek	Poland	University of Fine Arts, Poznań
The Last Drop	Az utolsó dobás	Anna Tőkés	Hungary	Moholy-Nagy University of Art and Design
The Tale of Tran Thanh Duong		Hachul Le Do	Vietnam	Royal Melbourne Institute of Technology
The Virtue of Voice	Wat is Spreken Waard?	Leticia Van Neerven	Netherlands	AKV St. Joost
Triassic Cuddle	Un Cuplu Triasic	Iulia Teodora Turicianu	Romania	I. L. Caragiale National University of Theatre and Film
Veils of Landscape		Yamanaka Chihiro	Japan	Tokyo University of the Arts
Weathered		Karina Casanas Invernon, Jáchym Bouzek	United Kingdom	University of the Arts London
Won't Be Here		Jiali Tan, Haoyuan Zhu	China	Communication University of China

=== Out of competition ===
==== Screening Events ====
Title	Director(s)	Production countrie(s)
A Legendary Encounter: Icons of Animation Celebrate The Simpsons (Note: Exclusive panel with the series creator Matt Groening alongside executive prodycer and showrunner Matt Selman and animator David Silverman.)		United States
Animal Farm	Andy Serkis	United States, Canada, United Kingdom
Creating Creativity: Celebrating 25 Years of Cartoon Network Studios (Note: Conversation panels with creators Genndy Tartakovsky (Dexter's Laboratory), Craig McCracken (The Powerpuff Girls), Pendleton Ward (Adventure Time), Rebecca Sugar (Steven Universe), J.G. Quintel (Regular Show), and Adam Muto (Adventure Time: Fionna and Cake).)		United States
Fixed	Genndy Tartakovsky	United States
Goat (Note: First look of Sony Pictures Animation's Goat, expected to be released in 2026.)	Tyree Dillihay	United States
Maya, Give Me a Title	Michel Gondry	France
Next on Netflix Animation: From Stranger Things to In Your Dreams (Note: Sneak peek of the animated series Stranger Things: Tales from '85, based on Stranger Things, and screening of extensive footage of Alex Woo's In Your Dreams, expected to be released in 2025.)		United States
Pets on a Train	Jean-Christian Tassy, Benoît Daffit	France
Pixar Animation Studios Spotlight — To Elio... and Beyond! (Note: Screening of exclusive footage of Elio, directed by Madeline Sharafian, Domee Shi, and Adrian Molina, and slated to be released on June 20, 2025. First looks of upcoming films Hoppers and Toy Story 5.)		United States
Waksberg Masterclass (Note: Conversation panel with Raphael Bob-Waksberg.)		United States
The Bad Guys 2 (Note: Screening of exclusive footage of DreamWorks Animation's The Bad Guys 2, slated to be released on August 1, 2025.)	Pierre Perifel	United States
The Songbirds' Secret	Antoine Lanciaux	France, Belgium
Walt Disney Animation Studios – Welcome Back to Zootopia! (Note: First look of Zootopia 2, directed by Jared Bush and Byron Howard, and expected to be released on November 26, 2025.)		United States
Smurfs x SpongeBob x Turtles: A Paramount Animation & Nickelodeon Presentation (Note: Exclusive panel featuring Chris Miller's Smurfs and Derek Drymon's The SpongeBob Movie: Search for SquarePants, slated for July 18, 2025 and December 19, 2025, respectively. Also screenings of two short films: Sean Charmatz's Order Up and Kent Seki's Teenage Mutant Ninja Turtles: Chrome Alone 2 – Lost in New Jersey.)		United States

==== Annecy Presents ====
English title	Original title	Director(s)	Production countrie(s)
100 Meters		Kenji Iwaisawa	Japan
Captain Sabertooth and the Countess of Grel	Kaptein Sabeltann og Grevinnen av Grel	Yaprak Morali, Are Aystnes, Rasmus A. Sivertsen	Norway
Chickenhare and the Secret of the Groundhog		Benjamin Mousquet	Belgium, France
Fleak		Jens Moller, Miko Pitkanen, Luca Bruno	Finland, France, Malaysia, Poland
I Am Frankelda	Soy Frankelda	Rodolfo Ambriz, Arturo Ambriz	Mexico
Little Caribou		Barry O'Donoghue	Ireland
Mary Anning		Marcel Barelli	Belgium, Switzerland
My Grandfather is a Nihonjin	Meu Avô é um Nihonjin	Celia Catunda	Brazil
Spiked		Caroline Origer	Belgium, France, Luxembourg, United Kingdom
Stitch Head		Steve Hudson	Germany, Luxembourg
The Girl Who Stole Time		Ao Yu, Tienan Zhou	China
The Quest	Csongor és Tünde	Mali Csaba, Pálfi Zsolt	Hungary
Thelma's Perfect Birthday		Reinis Kalnaellis	Latvia, Luxembourg

==== Midnight Specials ====
English title	Original title	Director(s)	Production countrie(s)
All You Need Is Kill		Kenichiro Akimoto	Japan
Another World		Tommy Kai Chung Ng	Hong Kong
Heart of Darkness		Rogerio Nunes	Brazil, France
Mononoke the Movie: The Ashes of Rage	劇場版「モノノ怪 第二章 火鼠」	Kenji Nakamura, Kiyotaka Suzuki	Japan
Nightmare Bugs		Saku Sakamoto, Osamu Fukutani	Japan
Playing God		Matteo Burani	Italy, France

==== Work in Progress ====
English title	Original title	Director(s)	Production countrie(s)
Films
Carmen		Sébastien Laudenbach	France
Daisy's Life	ひな菊の人生	Masaaki Yuasa	Japan
Fairyheart		Anita Doron	Hungary, Canada, Germany
Fallen	Le corset	Louis Clichy	France, Belgium
Heirloom		Upamanyu Bhattacharyya	India
In Waves		Phuong Mai Nguyen	France, Belgium, United States
Lucy Lost		Olivier Clert	France
The Cat in the Hat		Alessandro Carloni, Erica Rivinoja	United States
The Devil's Vein		Germán Acuña	Chile, Colombia
The Mourning Children: Nagiko and the Girls Wearing Tsurubami Black	つるばみ色のなぎ子たち	Sunao Katabuchi	Japan
The Violonist		Ervin Han, Raul Garcia	Singapore, Spain, Italy
Zsazsa Zaturnnah		Avid Liongoren	Philippines, France
Series
Bitches		Manon Tacconi	France
Get Jiro		Rick Morales	United States
Tom Clancy's Splinter Cell: Deathwatch		Guillaume Dousse, Félicien Colmet Daâge	France, United States
Women Wearing Shoulder Pads		Gonzalo Cordova, Rodolfo Ambriz, Arturo Ambriz, Ana Coronilla, Fernanda G. Manzur, Irene Melis, Roberto Petiches, Marta Hernaiz Pidal	United States, Mexico

==== Hungarian Animation ====
English title	Original title	Director(s)	Production countrie(s)
Films
Bubble Bath (1979)	Habfürdő	György Kovásznai	Hungary
Son of the White Mare (1981)	Fehérlófia	Marcell Jankovics	Hungary
Heroic Times (1984)	Daliás idők	József Gémes	Hungary
The District! (2004)	Nyócker!	Áron Gauder	Hungary
Ruben Brandt, Collector (2018)	Ruben Brandt, a gyűjtő	Milorad Krstić	Hungary
Four Souls of Coyote (2023)	Kojot négy lelke	Áron Gauder	Hungary
Video Clip Geniuses
"Just Like" by Beat Dis		Andras Szabó	Hungary
"Délelőttök a kádba" by Péterfy Bori & Love Band & András Lovasi		László Csáki	Hungary
"Kaktusz" by Bioberber		Zsuzsanna Kreif	Hungary
"All I'm Saying" by James		Péter Vácz	United Kingdom
"Napséta" by Amorf Lovagok		László Csáki	Hungary
"Illuminair" by Middlemist Red		Nóvé Soma	Hungary
"Re" by Nils Frahm		Simon Balázs	Hungary
"Demons on the Beach" by Fran Palermo		Henri Gonzo	Hungary
"Where Blue Meets Red"		Tamás Patrovits	Hungary
"Together"		Kata Fodor	Hungary
"Meteor" by Architects		Jeb Hardwick, Peter Batory	Hungary
"Walking on the Planet" by Gábor Antal Trio		Tamara Bella, Gábor István Gurka, Kata Hollós, Kornél Pittmann	Hungary
"Keringő" by Dzsudló		Boglarka Aszity, Réka Anna Szakaly	Hungary

== Awards ==
The following awards were presented:

=== Feature films ===
- Cristal for Best Feature Film: Arco by Ugo Bienvenu
- Jury Award: ChaO by Yasuhiro Aoki
- Paul Grimault Award: Dandelion's Odyssey by Momoko Seto
- Contrechamp Grand Prix: Endless Cookie by Seth Scriver and Peter Scriver
- Contrechamp Jury Award: The Square by Kim Bo-sol
- Gan Foundation Award for Distribution: Olivia and the Invisible Earthquake by Irene Iborra
- Audience Award: Little Amélie or the Character of Rain by Maïlys Vallade and Liane-Cho Han

=== Short films ===
- Cristal for Best Short Film: The Night Boots by Pierre-Luc Granjon
- Jury Award: Les Bêtes by Michael Granberry
- Alexeïeff Parker Award: Sappho by Rosana Urbes
- Jean-Luc Xiberras Award for a First Film: Zwermen by Janneke Swinkels and Tim Frijsinger
- Off-Limits Award: The Graffiti by Ryo Orikasa
- Audience Award: The Night Boots by Pierre-Luc Granjon

=== TV and Commissioned Films ===
- Cristal for Best TV Production: Christo The Civilized Barbarian: "Hunting Party" by Shaddy Safadi
- Jury Award for a TV Series: Lena's Farm by Elena Walf
- Jury Award for a TV Special: An Almost Christmas Story by David Lowery
- Cristal for Best Commissioned Film: Naïve New Beaters & Star Feminine Band: "Ye Kuo Si Kuo" by Lola Lefrevre
- Jury Award for a Commissioned Film: Desi Oon by Suresh Eriyat
- Audience Award: Freaked Out: "Major Decision" by Théo Grosjean and Mothy Richard

=== Graduation Films ===
- Cristal for Best Graduation Film: Zootrope by Léna Martinez (École nationale supérieure des arts décoratifs)
- Jury Award: Between the Gaps by Martin Bonnin (La Poudrière)
- Lotte Reiniger Award: Q by Masataka Kihara (Tama Art University)

=== VR ===
- Cristal for Best VR Work: Fragile Home by Ondřej Moravec and Victoria Lopukhina

=== Special Prizes ===
- City of Annecy Award: Ibuka, Justice by Justice Rutikara
  - Jury Special Distinction Award: Psychonauts by Niko Radas
- André Martin Award for Best French Short Film: The Night Boots by Pierre-Luc Granjon
- SACEM Award for Best Original Music in a Short Film: Dollhouse Elephant by Jenny Jokela
- SACEM Award for Best Original Music Award in a Feature Film: Arnaud Toulon for Arco
  - Pablo Pico Distinction: Jean L'Appeau for Death Does Not Exist
- Young Audience Award: The Great Annual Party of the Creatures of the Moon by Francis Desharnais
- CANAL+ Junior Jury Award: Forevergreen by Nathan Engelhardt and Jeremy Spears
- XPPen Award for a Graduation Film: Won't Be Here by Jiali Tan and Haoyuan Zhu (Communication University of China)
- Festivals Connexion VR Award: Fragile Home by Ondřej Moravec and Victoria Lopukhina
- France TV Award for a Short Film: At Night by Pooya Afzali
- Vimeo Staff Pick Award for a Short Film in the Official and Off-Limits Categories: Les Bêtes by Michael Granberry
