= The Science of Sleep (soundtrack) =

Soundtrack album by Various artists
- Released: September 12, 2006
- Genre: Soundtrack
- Label: Astralwerks

Professional ratings
Review scores
Source	Rating
AllMusic	4/5 stars

The Science of Sleep is the soundtrack album to the Michel Gondry film of the same name. The score was composed by Jean-Michel Bernard.

The album features the song "If You Rescue Me", originally "After Hours" by The Velvet Underground.

The song "Instinct Blues" by the White Stripes is featured in the film but is not on the soundtrack album. The song "Your Heart Is an Empty Room" by Death Cab for Cutie is featured in some versions of the trailer.

== Track listing ==
All tracks written by Jean-Michel Bernard except where noted.

1. Générique Stéphane
2. Générique Début
3. Stéphane Visite Appart
4. Coutances
  - Written by Dick Annegarn
5. Rêve Grosses Mains
6. Robinet Cellophane
7. Grotte Machine À Écrire
8. Ulcer Soul
  - performed by The Willowz
  - written by Richie Eaton
9. Aristurtle
10. Générique Stéphane TV
11. Tours De Cartes
12. My Dear Neighbours
13. Baignoire Martine
14. Gérard Explique REM
15. If You Rescue Me (A Cappella)
  - performed by Linda Serbu
  - music by Lou Reed
16. If You Rescue Me (Chanson des Chats)
  - performed by Gael García Bernal, Sacha Bourdo, Alain Chabat and Aurelia Petit
  - music by Lou Reed
17. Grotte Stéphane Stéphanie
18. Steppin' Out
  - performed by Kool & the Gang
  - written by Robert E. Bell, George M. Brown, Eumir Deodato, Robert Michens, Charles J. Smith, James W. Taylor
19. Week-End De Ski
20. Golden The Pony Boy
21. Making Certain
  - performed by The Willowz
  - written by Richie Eaton
22. Rêve Patrick Dewaere
23. Stéphanie Quitte Le Café
24. Poursuite Pouchet
25. Stéphanie Blues
26. Thème Générique Fin "Golden The Pony Boy"
  - written by Jean-Michel Bernard, Kimiko Ono
