= Chacun Tout Le Monde =

Studio album by Oui Oui
- Released: 1989
- Recorded: July–August 1989
- Studio: Conny's Studio
- Genre: French pop
- Length: 42:11
- Label: Eurobond Records/YABA Music/Just'In Distribution
- Producer: Oui Oui

Oui Oui chronology
| Chacun Tout Le Monde (1989) | 'Formidable' (1991) |

"Chacun Tout Le Monde" ("Each One Everyone") is the first album released by French pop group Oui Oui on Eurobond Records in 1989. It was released on 12" vinyl under the YABA Music and Just'In Distribution labels, and is currently out of print. Personnel include Étienne Charry (guitar/vocals) Michel Gondry (drums) Nicolas Dufournet (bass) and Gilles Chapat (keyboards) Tracks one and two, "Les Cailloux" and "Ma Maison," respectively, were both made into music videos by drummer and filmmaker Michel Gondry, though the version of "Ma Maison" used for the video differs markedly from the LP version.

The cover art features marionette caricatures of the four band members, and is the same visual style used in the music video for the first track, "Les Cailloux." The marionettes and art were created by Frédérique Petit and Fabrice Moireau and was photographed by Jean-Louise Leibovitch. The concept was by Oui Oui-Le Village.

== Track listing ==
SIDE A (20:39)

1. "Les cailloux" ("The Pebbles") – 2:37
2. "Ma maison" ("My House") – 2:02
3. "Toc toc" ("Knock Knock") – 2:56
4. "Les géants des bois" ("Giants of the Woods") – 3:02
5. "Derrière leur nez" ("Behind Their Nose") – 2:24
6. "La croisière" ("The Cruise") – 2:03
7. "Il mâchait" ("He Chewed") – 3:28
8. "Serrons les coudes" ("Let Us Tighten Our Elbows") – 2:07

SIDE B (21:32)

1. "Partir à L'aube" ("To Leave at Dawn") – 3:04
2. "Un loup sous le lit" ("A Wolf Under the Bed") – 3:38
3. "Mac pichney" ("Mac Pichney") – 2:08
4. "Petit mimosa" ("Small Mimosa") – 2:06
5. "Plum pudding" – 3:12
6. "Où vont les poussières" ("Where Dust Goes") – 3:12
7. "Ils n'maiment plus" ("They don't like me anymore") – 2:34
8. "Bonne nuit" ("Good Night") – 1:38

== Personnel ==
=== Oui Oui ===
- Étienne Charry – Lead guitar, Lead vocals
- Michel Gondry – Drums and percussion
- Nicolas Dufournet – Bass guitar
- Gilles Chapat – Keyboards

=== Additional Personnel ===
- Catherine Arnoux-Bruno Lhuissier – Violins
- Carlos Dourthe – Violoncello
- Marie-Noëlle Gondry – Flute
- Jean-Louise Bompoint – Bugle, trumpet, vibraphone
- Grand Magasin – Choruses
- Frédérique Petit – Piano
- Abraham Sirinix – Trombone (courtesyof O.T.T.)
- Twist – Trumpet
- Anne-Marie, Francis et Luca – Claps
