= Jean-Michel Bernard =

- Born: 23 November 1961 (age 64); France
- Origin: France
- Occupations: Composer; musician
- Years active: 1991–present
- Website: www.jmbernard.net

Jean-Michel Bernard (born 23 November 1961) is a French pianist, composer, educator, orchestrator, and music producer. He is well known for regularly writing, performing, and scoring for films, such as The Science of Sleep, Hugo, Paris-Manhattan, Ca$h, and Be Kind Rewind.

== Early life and career beginnings ==
Bernard began playing the piano at the age of two. When he was 14, he was awarded first place at the Bordeaux Conservatory and later graduated from the École Normale de Musique de Paris. At 19, he recorded with the Royal Philharmonic Orchestra in London, whilst pursuing a career as a jazz musician and performing with prominent jazz artists including Wild Bill Davis, Jimmy Woode (Duke Ellington's bassist) and Eddie "Lockjaw" Davis.

From 1987 to 1991, he worked as musical director and conductor of the successful radio show L’Oreille en Coin on National Public Radio France Inter. Between 2000 and 2003, he performed with the Ray Charles Quartet on the European and Australian tours as organist and conductor, "this guy is a genius" Ray used to say concerning Bernard. He also scored many documentaries and commercials during the 1990s. His career as a composer began with animated films, followed by collaborations with masters such as Lalo Schifrin and Ennio Morricone.

He frequently works with director Michel Gondry and has composed songs for films including Human Nature and he scored The Science of Sleep, which screened at the Sundance Film Festival and Berlin Film Festival. He was nominated for the World Soundtrack Awards in 2007 as Discovery of the Year and won the France Musique/UCMF award at the Cannes Film Festival the same year for this movie.

In 2003, Bernard wrote the music for TF1's À prendre ou à laisser, the French version of Deal or No Deal.

In 2008 he scored the music for Gondry's Be Kind Rewind, Cash by Eric Besnard, and A Pain in the Ass by Francis Veber. The same day Be Kind Rewind was shown at the Sundance Festival, Bernard performed alongside rapper/singer Mos Def and Gondry, an avid drummer.

The following year, the Cannes Film Festival invited him to represent France in the film music concert program. He also received an award for his achievement outside of his native country from the European Union of Film Music Composers (UCMF) and was appointed as sound designer for both HBO's channel and website.

He has collaborated with French actress and director Fanny Ardant on two of her films, Chimères Absentes and Cadences Obstinées starring Gérard Depardieu and worked on Academy Award-winning Hugo by Martin Scorsese. He scored the music of Love Punch by Joel Hopkins starring Pierce Brosnan and Emma Thompson, Love at First Child by Anne Giafferi and Money by Georgian director Gela Babluani. Bernard has conducted master classes at the Cannes Film Festival as well as in Montreal, Angers, La Rochelle, Kraków, Cologne and in Aubagne, where he performed a live version of Jazz For Dogs, an album co-created with Kimiko Ono and featuring a number of prestigious guests including Fanny Ardant, Francis Lai and Laurent Korcia.

In 2014, Bernard began teaching film music classes at the Paris Conservatory and was guest of honor with Michael Giacchino at the Audi Talent Awards in Paris with the Paris Symphonic Orchestra, at Braunschweig Festival and at Soundtrack Cologne Festival. He scored "Terra", a contemporary dance project which premiered at the Coronet in London in March 2016 and participated as composer, arranger and performer on The Avalanches long-awaited second album "Wildflower which just got gold certified album 2018. His most recent project is an album celebrating the legendary Lalo Schifrin entitled Jean-Michel Bernard plays Lalo Schifrin which includes 3 piano duets with the master himself. The album will be released in 2017 with concerts in Los Angeles, Paris, and Japan, at the Tokyo Blue Note Jazz Festival. Money by Gela Babluani has been awarded at the Beuxelles film festival (best film, best director). Bernard won the Grand Prix Sacem 2017 for best composer for screen at la Salle Pleyel in Paris. He is a Steinway Artist since 2018.

Bernard will tour around the world in 2018 with his new piano recital "Play Piano Play" (USA, Japan Yokohama French film music Festival, Fimucité 12 in Tenerife etc.) as well as a conference at the Geidai University in Tokyo.

He played for the 2018 opening ceremony at the Directors Guild of America theater in Los Angeles a concert homage to and with Lalo Schifrin and at the Steinway Beverly Hills Gallery.

== Career ==
He was elected to the administrative board of the Union des compositeurs de musique de film (UCMF) (Union of Film Music Composers).

In May 2016, Bernard was a guest at the Kraków Film Music Festival alongside Harry Gregson-Williams. In May 2017 he performed at the Kraków Film Music Festival his piano recital "cinematic Piano", one of the highlight of the festival.

Bernard contributed as composer and arranger on The Avalanches' second studio album Wildflower on songs featuring Danny Brown, Jonathan Donahue, MF Doom, and Biz Markie. He is credited on three tracks. He will tour in Japan in October 2016 invited by the French Institute for series of concerts and conferences for the Tokyo Film Festival.

== Filmography ==
Soundtrack composer

- 1990: Jours tranquilles à Clichy by Claude Chabrol
- 1991: Madame Bovary by Claude Chabrol
- 1999: L'Âme sœur by Jean-Marie Bigard
- 2006: The Science of Sleep by Michel Gondry (award UCMF/France Musique Cannes 2007, awarded festival BO de Paris, nomination World soundtrack awards)
- 2007: Ma place au soleil by Éric de Montalier
- 2007: Détrompez-vous by Bruno Dega
- 2008: Be Kind Rewind by Michel Gondry
- 2008: Ca$h by Éric Besnard
- 2008: A pain in the ass by Francis Veber
- 2008: Freud's Magic Powder by Edouard Getaz
- 2010: Vieilles Canailles, téléfilm by Arnaud Sélignac
- 2011: Hugo Cabret de Martin Scorsese (nomination Oscars 2012)
- 2011: Qui an envie d'être aimé ? by Anne Giafferi
- 2011: Chimères absentes by Fanny Ardant
- 2011: Bienvenue à bord by Éric Lavaine
- 2012: Paris-Manhattan by Sophie Lellouche with Woody Allen
- 2012: L'Oncle Charles by Étienne Chatiliez
- 2013: Love Punch by Joel Hopkins
- 2013: Cadences obstinées by Fanny Ardant
- 2013: Des frères et des sœurs by Anne Giafferi (award festival de La Rochelle 2013)
- 2014: La Vie à l'envers by Anne Giafferi
- 2014: Rester là by Fabien Daphy
- 2014: De quoi je me mêle by Pablo Larcuen
- 2015:Love at First Child by Anne Giafferi
- 2017: Money by Gela Babluani (13 Tzameti, grand prize Sundance and Venise) awarded at Bruxelles film festival
- 2018: With my own two hands by Michael Barocas, grand prix five continents film music festival for best music
- 2019: Ni une ni deux by Anne Giafferi with Mathilde Seigner
- 2019: ballad for a pierced heart by Yiannis Economides
- 2022: Heureusement qu'on s'a by Anne Giafferi

== Discography ==
- 1991: Yellow Cow (with the Paris Philharmonic orchestra, soloist Eric Marienthal)
- 1999: stories Marchand (cd France Inter)
- 2002: French Cinema-Bruton Music
- 2005: Message to Ray
- 2006: The Science of Sleep
- 2008: Original Soundtrack Be Kind Rewind
- 2008: Original Soundtrack Cash
- 2011: Original Soundtrack of Who wants to be loved?
- 2011: Original Soundtrack Welcome aboard
- 2011: Original Soundtrack of Hugo
- 2012: Original Soundtrack of Paris-Manhattan
- 2013: Original Soundtrack The Love Punch
- 2013: Original Soundtrack of obsessive rhythms
- 2014: Jazz for Dogs
- 2014: Original Soundtrack Life upside
- 2015: Original Soundtrack Angel and Gabrielle (Love at first child)
- 2016: Original Soundtrack of "Terra" contemporary dance, first in London in March 2016
- 2017/18: album Varèse Sarabande-Cristal/Sony "Jean-Michel Bernard plays Lalo Schifrin"
- 2018: Jean-Michel Bernard live in Paris (@ Steinway hall)
- 2019: Sally Stevens sings, Jean-Michel Bernard plays (Lakeshore records)
- 2022: The singular world of Jerry Goldsmith as seen by Jean-Michel Bernard (Cristal records)
- 2022: Piano Cinéma (Sony Masterworks) - collection of 3 albums
- 2022: Piano Noël (Sony Masterworks)
- 2023: His Songs (Sony Masterworks) piano tribute to Elton John

== Awards ==
- 2007: France Musique/UCMF prize at Cannes Film Festival 2007 for best score for The Science of Sleep by Michel Gondry
- 2007: Public prize Paris Cinema Festival for The Science of Sleep by Michel Gondry
- 2007: Nomination "discovery of the year" World Soundtracks Awards
- 2009: Best European composer UCMF-FFACE at Cannes Film Festival
- 2014: prize homage Audi Talents Awards Paris Film Music Festival at Le Grand Rex
- 2017: grand prix Sacem for Best composer for films career
- 2018: Album Wildflower (The Avalanches) Gold certified
- 2018: Grand Prix five continents fill awards for best score (with my own two hands)
- 2021: nomination @ the Greek Iris Awards for best score (ballad for a pierced heart)
- 2022 Apulia Film Music Festival Award for contribution to Film Music
- 2023 Member of Academy of Motion Picture, Arts and Sciences (Oscars)
