= Olivia and the Invisible Earthquake =

- Catalan theatrical release poster
- Catalan: L'Olívia i el terratrèmol invisible
- Directed by: Irene Iborra Rizo
- Written by: Irene Iborra Rizo; Júlia Prats; Maite Carranza
- Based on: La pel·lícula de la vida by Maite Carranza
- Cinematography: Isabel de la Torre
- Production companies: Citoplasmas Stopmotion; Kinetic Armatures; Cornelius Films; Bígaro Films; Vivement Lundi!; Panique! Production; Pájaro
- Distributed by: Filmax (Spain); KMBO (France)
- Release dates: 9 June 2025 (Annecy); 21 November 2025 (Spain)
- Running time: 70 minutes
- Countries: Spain; France; Belgium; Chile; Switzerland
- Language: Catalan

Olivia and the Invisible Earthquake (Catalan: L'Olívia i el terratrèmol invisible) is a 2025 stop-motion film directed by Irene Iborra Rizo based on the novel La pel·lícula de la vida by Maite Carranza. It is an international co-production by companies from Spain, France, Belgium, Chile, and Switzerland.

== Plot ==
Set in Barcelona, the plot follows 12-year old Olívia, her mother Ingrid, and her little brother Tim as the family is evicted.

== Voice cast (Catalan) ==
- Celia Sol as Olívia
- Hug Mont as Tim
- Sílvia Vilarrasa as Ingrid

== Production ==
The film is a Spanish-French-Belgian-Chilean-Swiss co-production by Citoplasmas Stopmotion, Kinetic Armatures, Cornelius Films, Bígaro Films, Vivement Lundi!, Panique! Production, and Pájaro. It had the participation of RTVE, 3Cat, À Punt, Movistar Plus+, and RTBF.

Filming of the stop motion animation took place in an industrial unit in Sant Martí.

== Release ==
Olivia and the Invisible Earthquake had its world premiere at the 2025 Annecy International Animation Film Festival on 9 June 2025. Its festival run also included selections for screenings at the 78th Locarno Film Festival ('Locarno Kids'), the Ottawa International Animation Festival, the 70th Valladolid International Film Festival ('Meeting Point'), and the 63rd Gijón International Film Festival ('Enfants Terribles').

Distributed by Filmax, the film was released theatrically in Spain on 21 November 2025. KMBO handled French distribution.

== Reception ==
Manuel J. Lombardo of Diario de Sevilla gave the film a 3-star rating, declaring it "a socially committed, politically correct, lively proposal full of messages of solidarity, tolerance, and resilience for turbo-capitalist times".

== Accolades ==
Year	Award	Category	Nominee(s)	Result	Ref.
2026	18th Gaudí Awards	Best Animation Film		Won	
2026	40th Goya Awards	Best Animated Film		Nominated	

== See also ==
- List of Spanish films of 2025
