= Partizan Midi Minuit (production company) =

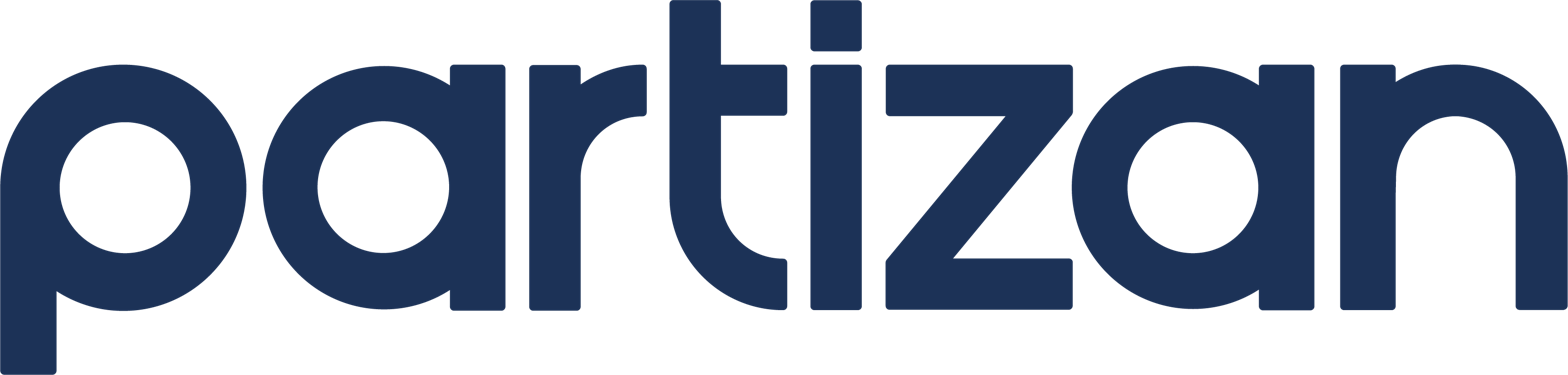
- Industry: Audiovisual Production
- Founded: 1986
- Founder: Georges Bermann
- Headquarters: Paris, France; London, United Kingdom; Los Angeles, United States
- Services: Production of : Music Videos; Branded Content; TV Series; Documentaries; Short Films; Feature Films
- Website: www.partizan.com

Partizan is an audiovisual production company created in Paris in 1986 by Georges Bermann under the name Midi Minuit, and operating internationally under its current name since 1991. The company is organized as "a community of directors" with offices located in London, Los Angeles and Paris.

Initially specializing in the direction of music videos, Partizan later expanded into producing branded content, short films and feature films, TV series as well as documentaries. Partizan is renowned for the inventiveness of its directors and has accumulated prestigious industry accolades, including MTV Music Awards, Grammy Awards, 88 Cannes Lions, 94 Clio Awards, 39 Yellow Pencils (D&AD) and 114 British Arrows (BTAA). It also took home a Grand Prix and a Palme d'Or at Cannes in 2003, and has been named Production Company of the Year multiple times at the Shots Awards.
Furthermore, its film productions are selected for A-list festivals such as the Cannes Film Festival, the Quinzaine and South by Southwest (SXSW). Its films have won awards at the Berlin International Film Festival, the BAFTAs, and the Toronto, Sundance and Tribeca film festivals, as well as nominations for the Academy Awards and the Césars.

== Partizan Group ==
The company is currently organized into several divisions :

- Midi Minuit Holding, which oversees all of the group's activities, including the production of commercials and music videos.
- Partizan Films, which produces feature films (among which Eternal Sunshine of the Spotless Mind, The Science of Sleep, Dog Pound, Moonwalkers, Better Man).
- Partizan Studio, which produces animated videos and films (Formerly, Partizan Lab).
- The Darkroom, a section dedicated to artistic experimentation.
- Royal Post, a post-production and special effects department.
- Partizan Management, a talent management division in Los Angeles that supports directors in their feature film and TV series projects.

== Main Associated Directors ==
Partizan has supported the career development of directors such as:

- AB/CD/CD
- Alexandre Courtès
- Ally Pankiw
- Amber Schaefer
- Anne Horel
- Antoine Bardou-Jacquet
- Camille Boumans
- Chris Cairns
- Daniel Sachon
- David Nicolas
- Dominic Murphy
- Doug Nichol
- Eric Coignoux
- Eric Lynne
- Ethan & Tom
- Gilles Lellouche
- Greg Pope
- Hervé Plumet
- Hiro Murai
- Joe Public
- James Pilkington
- Julien Soulier
- Kim Chapiron
- Kinga Burza
- Marc Caro
- Martin Stirling
- Matthias Hoene
- Michael Gracey
- Michel Gondry
- Nagi Noda
- Nico Beyer
- Nima Nourizadeh
- Olivier Gondry
- Patrik Bergh
- Philip Andelman
- Quentin Dupieux
- Raphaël Frydman
- Ray Tintori
- Rocky Morton
- Rozan & Schmeltz
- Santiago Carrasquilla
- Stephen Cafiero
- Thomas Hilland
- Tom Noakes
- Traktor
- Valérie Pirson
- Victor Haegelin
- Warren Fu

== Productions ==
=== Music Videos ===
- 1986 : Elli Medeiros Toi mon toit directed by Chantal Perrin
- 1987 : Indochine Les Tzars directed by Marc Caro
- 1993 : Björk Human Behaviour directed by Michel Gondry
- 1993 : IAM Je danse le Mia directed by Michel Gondry
- 1993 : Jean-François Coen La Tour de Pise directed by Michel Gondry
- 1995 : The Rolling Stones Like a Rolling Stone directed by Michel Gondry
- 1996 : Sneaker Pimps 6 Underground directed by Toby Tremlett
- 1996 : Sneaker Pimps Post-Modern Sleaze directed by Howard Greenhalgh
- 1997 : Daft Punk Around the World directed by Michel Gondry
- 1997 : Björk Bachelorette directed by Michel Gondry
- 1999 : Axelle Red Parce que c'est toi directed by Éric Coignoux, Philippe Gautier and Doug Nichol
- 1999 : Indochine Juste toi et moi directed by Jean-Pierre Pilot
- 2000 : Étienne Daho Intégrale clips directed by Éric Coignoux, Philippe Gautier and Doug Nichol
- 2001 : Basement Jaxx Where's Your Head At directed by Traktor
- 2001 : Fatboy Slim Ya Mama directed by Traktor
- 2002 : Nas One Mic directed by Chris Robinson
- 2002 : The White Stripes Seven Nation Army directed by Alex & Martin
- 2002 : Kylie Minogue Come into My World directed by Michel Gondry
- 2003 : Snoop Dogg & Charlie Wilson feat. Pharrell Williams Beautiful directed by Chris Robinson
- 2004 : U2 Vertigo directed by Alex & Martin
- 2005 : Dredg Bug Eyes directed by Philip Andelman
- 2013 : Daft Punk feat. Pharrell Williams Get Lucky directed by Warren Fu
- 2013 : Daft Punk and Julian Casablancas Infinity Repeating directed by Warren Fu
- 2017 : Shaka Ponk Gung Ho directed by Guillaume Panariello
- 2022 : Stromae L’Enfer directed by Julien Soulier
- 2024 : Indochine La Belle et la Bête directed by Art Camp
- 2025 : Megan Thee Stallion Neva Play directed by Warren Fu

=== Commercials ===
- 1995 : Levi’s “Drugstore” directed by Michel Gondry
- 1996 : Smirnoff “Smarienberg” pioneering the bullet time effect directed by Michel Gondry
- 1997 : Diesel “5AM Mono Village” directed by Traktor
- 1998 : Miller Lite “Arm Control” directed by Traktor
- 1999 : Levi’s “ID” feat. Flat Eric directed by Quentin Dupieux
- 2001 : Fox Sports “Campaign” directed by Traktor
- 2003 : Honda “Cog” directed by Antoine Bardou-Jacquet
- 2006 : Nespresso “What Else?” feat. George Clooney directed by Michel Gondry
- 2008 : Adidas “House Party” directed by Nima Nourizadeh
- 2009 : Evian “Roller Babies” directed by Michael Gracey
- 2009 : T-Mobile “Dance” directed by Michael Gracey
- 2010 : Hornbach “Hymne Des Machens” directed by Nico Beyer
- 2014 : Airline “Transavia – The Take-Off” directed by Victor Haegelin
- 2014 : Schwartz “The Sound of Taste” directed by Chris Cairns
- 2015 : Lego “Everything is not Awesome” directed by Martin Stirling
- 2018 : John Lewis “Moz The Monster” directed by Michel Gondry
- 2021 : Adobe “Fantastic Voyage” directed by Antoine Bardou-Jacquet
- 2023 : Canal+ “The Secret of Wakany” directed by Antoine Bardou-Jacquet
- 2024 : Loewe “Decades of Confusion” directed by Ally Pankiw
- 2025 : Coca-Cola x Marvel “The Heroes” directed by Antoine Bardou-Jacquet
- 2025 : Alpine “70th anniversary” directed by Antoine Bardou-Jacquet
- 2025 : Chanel “Métiers d’Art 2026” feat. Margaret Qualley and A$AP Rocky directed by Michel Gondry

=== Short Films ===
- 1994 : KO Kid by Marc Caro
- 1998 : The Letter by Michel Gondry
- 1999 : Black XXX-Mas by Pieter Van Hees
- 2001 : Pourkoi... Passkeu by Tristan Aurouet and Gilles Lellouche, won the Gras Savoye Award during Short Film Day at the Cannes Film Festival.
- 2002 : Véronique by Patrick Bergh, 1^{st} prize at the Short Film Festival - Film 4/Orange.
- 2003 : Little Clumps of Hair by Jim Hosking
- 2003 : Esther's Pool by David Chidlow
- 2003 : Goodbye, Cruel World by Vito Rocco
- 2006 : Work by Jim Hosking
- 2008 : Big Range by Michael Wright
- 2010 : Rob and Valentyna in Scotland by Eric Lynne, awarded at the Sundance Film Festival and the BAFTA/LA Short Film Award.
- 2013 : Zygomatiques by Stephen Cafiero, special jury award at the 28^{th} edition of the Brest European Short Film Festival, 1^{st} public award and best acting award (to Alexandre Astier and Simon Astier) at the Meudon Comedy Short Film Festival, shortlisted at the Critics’ Week of the Cannes Film Festival 2013.
- 2015 : Captain 3D by Victor Haegelin
- 2026 : The Shadows Weaver (La Tisseuse d’Ombres) by Anne Horel, awarded at the Artefact AI Film Festival, the WAIFF Cannes as well as the ADC Awards.

=== Feature Films ===
Year	Title	Director	Starring	Festivals	Genre
1993	Sting: Ten Summoners Tales	Doug Nichol		Grammy Awards (1994)	documentary music
1994	Lenny Kravitz: Alive from Planet Earth	Doug Nichol			documentary music
2001	Human Nature	Michel Gondry	Tim Robbins, Patricia Arquette, Rhys Ifans, Miranda Otto, and Rosie Perez	Cannes Film Festival (2001)	comedy drama
2004	Eternal Sunshine of the Spotless Mind	Michel Gondry	Jim Carrey, Kate Winslet and Kirsten Dunst, Mark Ruffalo, Elijah Wood, Tom Wilkinson	Academy Awards (2005), Berlin International Film Festival, Sundance Film Festival and BAFTAs	surrealist science fiction romantic drama
2006	Dave Chapelle’s Block Party	Michel Gondry	Dave Chappelle	Toronto International Film Festival (2005)	documentary concert
2006	The Science Of Sleep	Michel Gondry	Gael García Bernal, Charlotte Gainsbourg and Alain Chabat	Berlin International Film Festival (2006) and Sundance Film Festival (2006)	surrealistic science fantasy comedy
2008	Part of the Weekend Never Dies	Saam Farahmand et Soulwax			documentary music
2008	Be Kind, Rewind	Michel Gondry	Jack Black, Mos Def, Danny Glover, Mia Farrow, and Melonie Diaz	Berlin International Film Festival (2008) and Sundance Film Festival (2008)	buddy comedy
2010	Turn It Loose	Alastair Siddons		BFI London Film Festival (2010) and Edinburgh International Film Festival (2009)	documentary
2010	The Thorn In The Heart	Michel Gondry		Cannes Film Festival (2009)	documentary
2010	Dog Pound	Kim Chapiron		Tribeca Festival (2010)	psychological thriller
2011	The Art Of Love	Emmanuel Mouret	François Cluzet, Julie Depardieu and Frédérique Bel	BFI London Film Festival (2011)	comedy
2012	The We And The I	Michel Gondry		Directors’ Fortnight (2012)	comedy drama
2014	Is The Man Who Is Tall Happy?	Michel Gondry	Noam Chomsky	Berlin International Film Festival (2014)	documentary animation
2015	Being A.P.	Anthony Wonke		Toronto International Film Festival (2015)	documentary
2015	Microbe & Gasoline	Michel Gondry		New York Film Festival (2015), San Francisco International Film Festival (2016)	comedy drama road movie
2015	Moonwalkers	Antoine Bardou-Jacquet	Rupert Grint, Ron Perlman, Robert Sheehan	SXSW South by Southwest (2015)	comedy crime
2020	The Night Doctor (Médecin de Nuit)	Élie Wajeman	Vincent Macaigne and Sara Giraudeau	Cannes Film Festival (2020)	drama
2023	I Used To Be Funny	Ally Pankiw	Rachel Sennott, Olga Petsa and Jason Jones		comedy drama
2023	The Book of Solutions	Michel Gondry	Pierre Niney and Blanche Gardin	Directors’ Fortnight (2023)	comedy drama
2024	Maya, Give Me a Title	Michel Gondry	Pierre Niney	Crystal Bear at the Berlin International Film Festival (2025)	adventure animation comedy
2025	Better Man	Michael Gracey	Robbie Williams and Nicole Appleton	AACTA International Awards (2025)	biographical jukebox musical drama film
