= Higglety Pigglety Pop! or There Must Be More to Life =

- Film poster
- Directed by: Chris Lavis; Maciek Szczerbowski; Clyde Henry Productions
- Produced by: Spike Jonze; Vincent Landay; Marcy Page
- Starring: Meryl Streep; Spike Jonze; Forest Whitaker; Jack Gross Whitaker
- Edited by: Chris Lavis
- Music by: Jean-Frédéric Messier
- Distributed by: Warner Home Video; National Film Board of Canada
- Release date: March 2, 2010
- Running time: 23 minutes
- Country: Canada
- Language: English

Higglety Pigglety Pop! or There Must Be More to Life is a 2010 Canadian live-action/animated short film directed by Chris Lavis and Maciek Szczerbowski, collectively known as Clyde Henry Productions, and features the voices of Meryl Streep, Forest Whitaker and Spike Jonze. Jonze also served as producer along with Vincent Landay and Marcy Page. Higglety Pigglety Pop! or There Must Be More to Life was produced by the National Film Board of Canada in association with Warner Home Video.

It is based on the 1967 children's book of the same name written and illustrated by Maurice Sendak about the fictional adventures of his pet dog Jennie.

== Plot ==
A Sealyham Terrier named Jennie leaves a comfortable life and embarks on a journey for new experiences and stardom.

== Production ==
An associate of Jonze had been impressed by Lavis and Szczerbowski's previous work, the animated short Madame Tutli-Putli and suggested to the director that they would be suitable to create a short companion piece for the Blu-ray release of Where the Wild Things Are. Jonze contacted the animators while he was in France promoting Synecdoche, New York and the two met after, with Jonze proposing that they create a film based on some other short story by Sendak. Unfamiliar with Sendak's work, the filmmakers researched his work and settled on Higglety Pigglety Pop! as their choice to adapt.

The film is set in 17 different locations, with a total of 25 scenes. With just 10 months to create the entire film, the filmmakers could not use stop-motion or any of their traditional animation techniques. They decided instead to primarily make use of puppetry, combined with some stop-motion.

Meryl Streep, who voiced Jennie, was not yet cast when shooting had begun. Sendak provided Lavis and Szczerbowski with an old recording of Streep reading the book, doing all the voices, and the filmmakers were impressed. They approached her with the part and she agreed.

== Release ==
Higglety Pigglety Pop! or There Must Be More to Life had its world premiere at the Montreal Children's International Film Festival on February 28, 2010. It was then released along with the Blu-ray edition of Jonze's Where the Wild Things Are, released on March 2, 2010.

The film received two Golden Sheaf Awards, for Best Director (Fiction) and Best Children's and Youth Production, at the 2011 Yorkton Film Festival.

The film was a Jutra Award nominee for Best Animated Short Film at the 13th Jutra Awards in 2011.
