= The Night Boots =

2024 French animation film

- Promotional poster
- French: Les Bottes de la nuit
- Directed by: Pierre-Luc Granjon
- Written by: Pierre-Luc Granjon
- Produced by: Yves Bouveret
- Starring: Bernard Bouillon; Brieuc Laudet
- Edited by: Antoine Rodet
- Music by: Timothée Jolly
- Color process: Black and White
- Production company: Am Stram Gram
- Distributed by: Pentacle Distribution
- Release date: November 24, 2024 (Carrefour du cinéma d'animation)
- Running time: 12 minutes
- Country: France
- Language: French

The Night Boots (French: Les Bottes de la nuit) is a 2024 French animated short film directed by Pierre-Luc Granjon and made on Pinscreen animation.

The film had its premiere in the Professional French Short Films Part 1 at the Carrefour du cinéma d'animation, Paris on 24 November 2024.

The Night Boots was shortlisted for the 98th Academy Awards in the category of Best Animated Short Film.

== Summary ==
The story follows a child who, while his parents are entertaining guests, goes out alone into the forest at night. Wearing rubber boots, he encounters a solitary, enigmatic creature that guides him deeper into the woods, introducing him to its nocturnal inhabitants. Seeking companionship, the creature attempts to prolong the child's stay and delay his return home.

== Cast ==
- Bernard Bouillon
- Brieuc Laudet

== Release ==
The Night Boots was presented at The Stuttgart International Festival of Animated Film on 10 May 2025.

It competed in Short films in competition at the 2025 Annecy International Animation Film Festival with screening on 8 June 2025.

== Accolades ==
Award	Date of ceremony	Category	Recipient(s)	Result	Ref.
Annecy International Animation Film Festival	14 June 2025	Cristal Award for Best Short Film	The Night Boots	Won	
Annecy International Animation Film Festival	14 June 2025	Audience Award	The Night Boots	Won	
Annecy International Animation Film Festival	14 June 2025	André Martin Prize for Best French Short	The Night Boots	Won	

== See also ==
- List of submissions for the Academy Award for Best Animated Short Film
