= Oui Oui =

French pop group

Oui Oui were a French pop group formed in 1983. Guitarist-singer Étienne Charry and drummer Michel Gondry met at secondary school in Sèvres in 1978. The repertoire of songs Oui Oui built up was a reaction to what was termed cold wave music in France and the more politicised rock groups of the era. Numerous musicians passed through the group's ranks in the early years. With the addition of keyboardist Gilles Chapat and bassist Nicolas Dufournet, a more settled line-up was established.

In 1989, Oui Oui released their first album, Chacun Tout Le Monde on the Just'in label. Following the departure of Gilles Chapat, the second Oui Oui album Formidable (1991, released by FNAC Music) was recorded by the trio of Charry, Gondry, and Dufournet. Keyboardist Matthieu Ballet later took Chapat's place. Both Oui Oui albums are currently out of print, having been issued by labels which ceased operations within months of the respective albums' releases.

Oui Oui disbanded in 1992. Michel Gondry has since gone on to become an acclaimed movie and music video director. The film clips he directed for Oui Oui would later feature on the 2003 DVD The Work of Director Michel Gondry.

In 2011, at the Centre Georges Pompidou in Paris, Gondry gave an introduction to his workshop Amateur Film Factory, followed by three video clips and short movies. He then proceeded to reform Oui Oui for a one-hour performance in the forum of the museum. The line-up was composed of Gondry at the drums, Étienne Charry for the guitar and vocals, and Nicolas Dufournet as bassist.

== Discography ==
=== Album ===
- Chacun Tout Le Monde, 1989
- Formidable, 1991

== Videography ==
- "Un Joyeux Noël", 1988
- "Junior Et Sa Voix D'Or", 1988
- "Bolide", 1988
- "Les Cailloux", 1989
- "Ma Maison", 1990
- "La Ville", 1992
