= The Girl Who Cried Pearls =

- French: La jeune fille qui pleurait des perles
- Directed by: Chris Lavis; Maciek Szczerbowski
- Screenplay by: Chris Lavis; Maciek Szczerbowski; Isabelle Mandalian
- Produced by: Marc Bertrand; Christine Noël; Julie Roy
- Starring: Colm Feore; James Hyndman; Gabrielle Dallaire; Simone Paradis
- Music by: Patrick Watson
- Animation by: Laura Stewart; Laura Venditti; Peggy Arel
- Production company: National Film Board of Canada
- Release date: June 8, 2025 (Annecy)
- Running time: 17 minutes
- Country: Canada
- Languages: English; French

The Girl Who Cried Pearls (French: La jeune fille qui pleurait des perles) is a 2025 Canadian animated short film, directed by Chris Lavis and Maciek Szczerbowski. Made through stop-motion animation, the film centers on a young boy who meets and falls in love with a girl who secretly weeps pearls at night.

The initial inspiration for the film came during the production of the duo's 2007 short film Madame Tutli-Putli, when a prop necklace unexpectedly fell apart, scattering pearls across the set, as they were filming the climactic scene.

At the 98th Academy Awards, it won for Best Animated Short Film.

== Plot ==
The film begins in modern-day Paris, where a young girl explores her grandfather's study, discovering a pearl kept within a treasure box. Her grandfather explains that it's his most priceless treasure, and delves into the story of how he obtained it.

The story unfolds in early 20th-century Montreal, a poor boy living near the harbor survives by scavenging food and small items from shipments. He lives in an empty room beside an apartment housing a small family: a young girl abused by her cruel stepmother, and her frail father unable to help. At night, when the girl cries herself to sleep, her tears turn into pearls, of which she disposes the next morning in shame. The boy manages to retrieve the pearls and takes them to the local, merciless pawnbroker, who takes them to the jeweler for appraisal; the jeweler admits that he's never seen a similar pearl, and surmises that they are priceless. Though the pawnbroker initially doesn't believe the boy's fantastical story, the jeweler points to a biblical story of Eve's tears turning to pearls.

After lowballing the boy for the pearls, the pawnbroker urges him to collect more and build a partnership with him. The boy is initially unwilling, since he loves the girl and does not want to see her cry, even using his first bounty to buy her chocolates so that she will go to bed happily, but the pawnbroker insists that only wealth matters in the world.

The boy collects enough money to travel to Paris, but as he prepares to leave, he discovers that the girl's father has been killed in an accident. The boy stays for one more day and hears the grieving girl crying all night, and the next day, her apartment is empty, the family having moved somewhere unknown. The boy discovers hundreds of pearls in the flooring and takes them to the pawnbroker. Desperate for the chance to become unimaginably wealthy with the trove, the pawnbroker agrees to the boy's demands for a small fortune and sells his building to the jeweler to raise the funds. As the boy leaves for Paris with the money, the jeweler witnesses a crate break in the harbor, and thousands of pearls spill out, each identical to the boy's. He inquires on their origin, and a sailor explains that they're a new import from Japan—plastic.

The grandfather explains that a story gives an object its value, implying that he had scavenged the pearls and invented the backstory to trick the pawnbroker. His granddaughter wonders if the neighbor girl had ever even existed.

== Distribution ==
The Girl Who Cried Pearls premiered at the 2025 Annecy International Animation Film Festival. It has been released in an English version narrated by Colm Feore, and a French version narrated by James Hyndman.

The film was subsequently screened at the 2025 Toronto International Film Festival, where it was the winner of the award for Best Canadian Short Film.

== Reception ==
The film was named to the Toronto International Film Festival's annual year-end Canada's Top Ten list for 2025.

== Accolades ==
Award	Date of ceremony	Category	Recipient(s)	Result	Ref(s)
Academy Awards	March 15, 2026	Best Animated Short Film	Chris Lavis and Maciek Szczerbowski	Won	
Annecy International Animation Film Festival	2025	Benshi Award	Chris Lavis and Maciek Szczerbowski	Won	
Annie Awards	2026	Best Animated Short Subject	Chris Lavis and Maciek Szczerbowski	Nominated	
Bucheon International Animation Festival	2025	AniB's Choice Award	Chris Lavis and Maciek Szczerbowski	Won	
Canadian Screen Awards	2026	Best Animated Short	Chris Lavis, Maciek Szczerbowski, Julie Roy, Marc Bertrand, Christine Noël	Won	
Cinemania	2025	Compétition Courts métrages québécois	Chris Lavis and Maciek Szczerbowski	Nominated	
Countryside Animafest Cyprus	2025	Young Audience Competition	Chris Lavis and Maciek Szczerbowski	Nominated	
Ottawa International Animation Festival	2025	CFI Award for Best Canadian Animation	Chris Lavis and Maciek Szczerbowski	Won	
Toronto International Film Festival	2025	Best Canadian Short Film	Chris Lavis and Maciek Szczerbowski	Won	

== See also ==
- List of submissions for the Academy Award for Best Animated Short Film
