= Is the Man Who Is Tall Happy? =

2013 film

- Film poster
- Directed by: Michel Gondry
- Written by: Michel Gondry
- Produced by: Raffi Adlan; Georges Bermann; Julie Fong; Michel Gondry
- Starring: Noam Chomsky
- Edited by: Sophie Reine; Adam M. Weber
- Production company: Partizan Films
- Distributed by: IFC Films
- Release dates: 12 February 2013 (MIT); 30 April 2014 (France)
- Running time: 88 minutes
- Country: France
- Languages: English; French
- Box office: $137,042

Is the Man Who Is Tall Happy? is a 2013 French animated documentary film by Michel Gondry about the linguist, philosopher, and political activist Noam Chomsky.

== Cast ==
- Noam Chomsky as himself
- Michel Gondry as himself

== Release ==
Originally titled Is the Man Who Is Tall Happy?: An Animated Conversation with Noam Chomsky, it was first screened on 12 February 2013 at the Massachusetts Institute of Technology. The film had its European premiere in the Panorama section of the 64th Berlin International Film Festival.

== Reception ==
=== Reviews ===
Rotten Tomatoes reports that 92% of critics gave the film a positive review, based upon a sample of 38, with an average score of 7.2 out of 10. According to the site's critical consensus, "An unlikely pairing of form and style, Michel Gondry's Is the Tall Man Happy? [sic] successfully gives Noam Chomsky's philosophical musings an expressive canvas with a delightfully anarchic animation style." Metacritic, which assigns a rating out of 100 to reviews from mainstream critics, gave the film an average score of 76 based on 16 reviews.
