= Paris-Manhattan =

2012 film by Sophie Lellouche

- Theatrical release poster
- Directed by: Sophie Lellouche
- Written by: Sophie Lellouche
- Produced by: Philippe Rousselet
- Starring: Alice Taglioni; Patrick Bruel; Marine Delterme; Michel Aumont; Louis-Do de Lencquesaing; Marie-Christine Adam
- Cinematography: Laurent Machuel
- Edited by: Monica Coleman
- Music by: Jean-Michel Bernard
- Production companies: Vendôme Production; France 2 Cinéma; SND
- Distributed by: SND
- Release dates: 2 April 2012 (French Film Festival); 18 July 2012 (France)
- Running time: 77 minutes
- Country: France
- Languages: French; English
- Budget: €5.3 million
- Box office: $3 million

Paris-Manhattan is a 2012 French romantic comedy film written and directed by Sophie Lellouche in her feature directorial debut. It stars Alice Taglioni, Patrick Bruel, Marine Delterme, Michel Aumont, Louis-Do de Lencquesaing and Marie-Christine Adam.

== Plot ==
Alice Ovitz is a pharmacist from a Jewish family who during her early years was introduced to and fell in love with Woody Allen's films. Growing up, she strongly desires a relationship, but the only man she ever loved was taken away from her by her own sister. On Alice's bedroom wall hangs a huge poster of Woody Allen, with whom she has long night conversations, and he talks back to her through excerpts of dialogue from his films.

Ten years go by. Alice has taken over her father's pharmacy after he retired, her sister is long married to the man she stole from Alice, and the poster still hangs over the bed. She is thirty, and lonely, and her family is trying its best to introduce her to unmarried men. She is having a hard time choosing from two emerging suitors, Vincent and Victor. Almost by accident, but with help of Victor, Alice eventually meets Woody Allen on the streets of Paris. This time, the real Woody Allen, not the voice of the poster, gives her personal advice, which happens to be exactly what Alice considered doing anyway.

== Cast ==
- Alice Taglioni as Alice Ovitz
- Patrick Bruel as Victor
- Marine Delterme as Hélène
- Michel Aumont as Isaac Ovitz
- Marie-Christine Adam as Nicole Ovitz
- Louis-Do de Lencquesaing as Pierre
- Margaux Châtelier as Laura
- Yannick Soulier as Vincent
- Woody Allen as himself (uncredited)

== Release ==
Paris-Manhattan premiered at the Alliance Française French Film Festival in Australia on 2 April 2012. The film was released in France on 18 July 2012 and in Germany on 4 October 2012.

== Reception ==
Paris-Manhattan received mixed reviews from critics. On the review aggregator website Rotten Tomatoes, the film holds an approval rating of 41% based on 22 reviews, with an average rating of 5.2/10. Metacritic, which uses a weighted average, assigned the film a score of 36 out of 100, based on 10 critics, indicating "generally unfavorable" reviews.

Boyd van Hoeij of Variety noted its similarity to Woody Allen's own 1972 film Play It Again, Sam, stating that "This update-cum-ripoff might be aiming for witty and romantic, but it's mostly a hollow, rambling effort leavened with some stargazing". Jeannette Catsoulis of The New York Times was similarly critical, describing the film's use of the protagonist's obsession with Allen as "an excuse to pilfer words and ideas far beyond its ability to synthesize them."
