= Jörn Peter Hiekel =

German musicologist

Jörn Peter Hiekel (born 1963) is a German musicologist.

== Life ==
Born in Göttingen, Hiekel first studied musicology, art history and history at the universities of Cologne and Bonn before he completed his double bass studies at the Musikhochschule Köln. Afterwards he received his doctorate at the Rheinische Friedrich-Wilhelms-Universität Bonn.

He worked for many years as editor and publisher at the Breitkopf & Härtel music publishing house and as author for various ARD institutions and newspapers/magazines (including the Frankfurter Allgemeine Zeitung and Opernwelt).

Since 1992 a member of various early music ensembles, in 2002 he became a lecturer at the International Darmstadt Summer Courses for New Music and directed the composer seminars.

From 2003 he was assistant professor for 20th century music at the Hochschule für Musik Carl Maria von Weber Dresden. In 2005 he took over the direction of the Institute for New Music at the Technische Universität Dresden and in 2008 he habilitated in historical musicology at the Technische Universität Dresden and took over a professorship for musicology/new music at the HfM Dresden. Since 2008 he is lecturer for music aesthetics and musicology at the Zurich University of the Arts.

Hiekel is a member of the Sächsische Akademie der Künste, in 2008-2014 secretary and since June 2015 deputy secretary of the Academy's music class. Since 2008 he is head of the mediation project KlangNetz Dresden, since 2012 board member of KlangNetz Dresden e. V. 2004-2019 he was board member of the Darmstadt Institute for New Music and Music Education (INMM), which he took over in 2013.

In 2014 he was awarded the Saxon Teaching Prize, which was presented for the first time. In 2019 he received the 10,000 EUR prize at the Bavarian Academy of Arts. "Happy New Ears"-Preis für Publizistik.

== Publications ==
- (ed.) Überblendungen. Neue Musik mit Film/Video (Veröffentlichungen des Instituts für Neue Musik und Musikerziehung Darmstadt, vol. 56), Schott-Verlag, Mainz 2016.
- (ed. gemeinsam mit Pierre Michel und Marik Froidefond)UNITÉ – PLURALITÉ. La musique de Hans Zender, Editions Herman, Paris 2015.
- (ed.) Zurück zur Gegenwart? Weltbezüge in neuer Musik (Veröffentlichungen des Instituts für Neue Musik und Musikerziehung Darmstadt, vol. 55), Schott-Verlag, Mainz 2015.
- (ed. gemeinsam mit Wolfgang Lessing): Verkörperungen der Musik. Interdisziplinäre Betrachtungen, transcript Verlag, Bielefeld 2014.
- (ed.) Hans Zender: Waches Hören. Texte zur Musik, Hanser Verlag, München 2014.
- (ed.): Ins Offene? Neue Musik und Natur (Veröffentlichungen des Instituts für Neue Musik und Musikerziehung Darmstadt, vol. 54), Schott-Verlag, Mainz 2014.
- Bernd Alois Zimmermanns „Requiem für einen jungen Dichter“ (Archiv für Musikwissenschaft. Beiheft 36). Steiner, Stuttgart 1995.
- (ed.): Hans Zender: Die Sinne denken. Schriften zur Musik 1965–2003. Breitkopf & Härtel, Wiesbaden 2004.
- Wilfried Krätzschmar – Perspektiven seines Schaffens. Sandstein, Dresden 2005.
- with S. Mauser (ed.): Nachgedachte Musik. Studien zum Werk Helmut Lachenmanns. Pfau, Saarbrücken 2005.
- Musik inszeniert. Vermittlung und Präsentation von zeitgenössischer Musik. Schott, Mainz 2006.
- with Manuel Gervink (ed.): Dmitri Shostakovich – das Spätwerk und sein zeitgeschichtlicher Kontext. Sandstein, Dresden 2006.
- with Manuel Gervink (ed.): Robert Schumanns „Welten“. Sandstein, Dresden 2007.
- with E. Werner (ed.): Musikkulturelle Wechselbeziehungen zwischen Böhmen und Sachsen. Pfau, Saarbrücken 2007.
- with W. Gratzer (ed.): Ankommen: Gehen. Adriana Hölszkys Textkompositionen. Schott, Mainz 2007.
- (ed.): Sinnbildungen. Spiritualität in der Musik heute. Schott, Mainz 2008 (Veröffentlichungen des Instituts für Neue Musik und Musikerziehung Darmstadt. Vol. 48).
- (ed.): Musik-Kulturen (Darmstädter Diskurse. VOl. 2). Pfau, Saarbrücken 2008.
- with M. Gervink (ed.): Klanglandschaften. Musik und gestaltete Natur. Wolke, Hofheim 2009.
- (ed.): Vernetzungen. Neue Musik im Spannungsfeld von Wissenschaft und Technik. Schott, Mainz 2009 (Veröffentlichungen des Instituts für Neue Musik und Musikerziehung Darmstadt. Vol. 49).
- with M. Demuth (ed.): Freiräume und Spannungsfelder. Zur Situation der zeitgenössischen Musik heute. Schott, Mainz 2009.
- with A. Goetze (ed.): Religion und Glaube als künstlerische Kernkräfte im Werk von Olivier Messiaen. Wolke, Hofheim 2010.
- with M. Demuth (ed.): Kulturelle Identität(en) in der Musik der Gegenwart. Pfau, Saarbrücken 2010.
- (ed.): Musik und andere Künste. Schott, Mainz 2010 (Veröffentlichungen des Instituts für Neue Musik und Musikerziehung Darmstadt. Vol. 50).
- Vorzeitbelebung. Vergangenheits- und Gegenwartsbezüge in der Musik. Wolke, Hofheim 2010.
- (ed.): Neue Musik in Bewegung. Musik- und Tanztheater heute. Schott, Mainz 2011 (Veröffentlichungen des Instituts für Neue Musik und Musikerziehung Darmstadt. Vol. 51).
- with M. Demuth (ed.): Hören und Denken: Musik und Philosophie heute. Schott, Mainz 2011.
- (ed.): Die Kunst des Überwinterns: Musik und Literatur um 1968. Böhlau, Weimar/Köln/Wien 2011.
- (ed.): Wechselwirkungen. Neue Musik und Film. Wolke, Hofheim 2012.
- (ed.): Berührungen. Über das (Nicht-)Verstehen von Musik heute. Schott, Mainz 2012 (Veröffentlichungen des Instituts für Neue Musik und Musikerziehung Darmstadt. Vol. 52).
- with Patrick Müller (ed.): Transformationen. Zur Musik von Klaus Huber. Schott, Mainz 2012.
- (ed.): Populär vs. Elitär? Wertvorstellungen und Popularisierungen der Musik heute. Schott, Mainz 2013.
- (ed.): Ans Licht gebracht? Zur Interpretation Neuer Musik. Schott, Mainz 2013 (Veröffentlichungen des Instituts für Neue Musik und Musikerziehung Darmstadt. Vol. 53).
- with Christian Utz (ed.): Lexikon Neue Musik. Metzler Verlag u. Bärenreiter Verlag, Stuttgart/Kassel 2016.
- (ed.): Body sounds. Aspekte des Körperlichen in der Musik der Gegenwart. Schott, Mainz 2017 (Veröffentlichungen des Instituts für Neue Musik und Musikerziehung Darmstadt. Vol. 57).
- with David Roesner (ed.): Gegenwart und Zukunft des Musiktheaters. Theorien, Analysen, Positionen. transcript, Bielefeld 2018.
- (ed.): Clash! Generationen – Kulturen – Identitäten in der Gegenwartsmusik. Schott, Mainz 2018 (Veröffentlichungen des Instituts für Neue Musik und Musikerziehung Darmstadt. Vol. 58).
- with Wolfgang Mende (ed.): Klang und Semantik. transcript, Bielefeld 2018.
- (ed.): Gegenwartsmusik als Forschung und Experiment Schott, Mainz 2019 (Veröffentlichungen des Instituts für Neue Musik und Musikerziehung Darmstadt. VOl. 59).
- Bernd Alois Zimmermann in seiner Zeit Laaber Verlag 2019.
