= Ibuka, Justice =

2024 Canadian animated documentary film

- Directed by: Justice Rutikara
- Written by: Justice Rutikara
- Produced by: Mylène Augustin
- Starring: Jean-Claude Rutikara; Valentine Mukasafari
- Edited by: Noah Jung; Sunny Stanila; Bren López Zepeda
- Music by: Aiko Devriendt
- Animation by: Melanie O'Bomsawin; Bren López Zepeda
- Production company: Yzanakio
- Distributed by: Spira
- Release date: March 22, 2024 (Regard)
- Running time: 23 minutes
- Country: Canada
- Languages: French; Kinyarwanda

Ibuka, Justice is a Canadian short animated documentary film, directed by Justice Rutikara and released in 2024.

== Synopsis ==
The film recreates the experience of his parents in seeking to escape from their home in Kigali, and move to Canada as refugees, when the Rwandan Civil War breaks out just six months after Rutikara's own birth.

The film features Rutikara's parents, Jean-Claude Rutikara and Valentine Mukasafari, narrating their own story.

== Release ==
The film premiered at the Regard short film festival on March 22, 2024.

== Awards ==
Award	Date of ceremony	Category	Recipient(s)	Result	Ref.
Annecy International Animation Film Festival	2025	City of Annecy Award	Justice Rutikara	Won	
Prix Iris	December 2025	Best Animated Short Film	Justice Rutikara, Mylène Augustin	Nominated	
Canadian Screen Awards	2026	Best Animated Short	Justice Rutikara, Mylène Augustin	Nominated	
