= Black XXX-Mas =

- Directed by: Pieter Van Hees
- Written by: Pieter Van Hees
- Produced by: Georges Bermann
- Starring: Don Warrington; Rochelle Gadd; Manou Kersting; Hilde Wils
- Cinematography: Glynn Speeckaert
- Edited by: Bill Smedley
- Music by: Clifford Gilbert
- Production company: Midi Minuit
- Release date: 14 December 1999
- Running time: 11 minutes
- Country: Belgium
- Languages: Dutch; English

Black XXX-Mas is a 1999 Belgian short film by Pieter Van Hees about a poor family on Christmas Eve, in a story that loosely follows Little Red Riding Hood. It stars Rochelle Gadd, Don Warrington, and Manou Kersting.

== Plot ==
Little Red (Rochelle Gadd) goes out on Christmas Eve to buy some drugs on the dangerous streets, aptly named "The Forest". She is caught with a joint by a crooked police officer, "Wolfy" (Manou Kersting), who seems more interested in molesting Red than making the arrest. When some careless tourists snap photos of Wolfy's lewd behavior, he is forced to shoot them, then eats Red, the only witness.

Meanwhile, Red's father, Black Santa (Don Warrington), goes out to steal some presents from rich families. He happens to break into Wolfy's house, and ends up having sex with his wife. Wolfy comes home to find his wife with Santa, and shoots her. Santa manages to grab a gun from above the fireplace and shoots Wolfy. Hearing Red's voice coming from inside Wolfy's body, Santa tears open Wolfy's body to find his daughter safe, although shaken.

Later in the evening, Red and her family sing carols around the Christmas tree, which is now topped by a star, Wolfy's police badge.

== Cast ==
- Don Warrington as Black Santa
- Rochelle Gadd as Little Red
- Manou Kersting as Office Wolfy
- Hilde Wils as Mrs. Santa

== Reception ==
Academic Jack Zipes wrote, "As gruesome as this film is, it is also very funny." In reviewing it on a collection of shorts from Atom.com, Chris Hughes of DVD Talk called the premise "a springboard for broad religious and social satire". Hughes described the dialogue as "snappy and quotable".

It won a Pixie Award in 2001.
