= Maya, Give Me a Title =

2024 film by Michel Gondry

- Theatrical release poster
- French: Maya, donne-moi un titre
- Directed by: Michel Gondry
- Written by: Michel Gondry
- Produced by: Georges Bermann
- Starring: Pierre Niney; Maya Gondry
- Narrated by: Pierre Niney
- Cinematography: Laurent Brunet
- Edited by: Elise Fievet
- Music by: Jean-Michel Bernard
- Animation by: Michel Gondry; Julien Malegue; Antoine Mayet; Joseph Catté; Mathieu de Brun; Anelle Derouet; Terence Nury
- Color process: Color
- Production company: Partizan Films
- Distributed by: The Jokers
- Release dates: 2 October 2024 (France); 15 February 2025 (Berlinale)
- Running time: 61 minutes
- Country: France
- Language: French
- Box office: US$72,078

Maya, Give Me a Title (French: Maya, donne-moi un titre) is a 2024 French animated adventure comedy film written and directed by Michel Gondry. It uses the technique of paper cut-out animation and stop motion and also features short live-action sequences. The film was released in the French theatres on 2 October 2024.

The film won Generation Kplus Crystal Bear for the Best Film at the 75th Berlin International Film Festival on 23 February 2025.

== Synopsis ==
Michel Gondry, to keep in touch with his daughter Maya who lives overseas, creates animated stories from spontaneous script ideas suggested by her. With colored paper, scissors, Scotch tape, and a camera, he embarks on an inventive and collaborative project, drawing Maya into the world of fantastic tales.

== Voice cast ==
- Pierre Niney
- Maya Gondry

== Release ==
Maya, Give Me a Title had its International premiere in the Generation Kplus section of the 75th Berlin International Film Festival on 15 February 2025. In June, it was also screened at the 2025 Annecy International Animation Film Festival, where Gondry received an Honorary Lifetime Award. It was also selected at the 29th Fantasia International Film Festival for screening on 19 July 2025.

It was also screened in 2nd Mostrinha at the São Paulo International Film Festival on 18 October 2025, and in the 'Special screening Section' of the 70th Valladolid International Film Festival on 25 October 2025.

It will be screened in Special Screenings at the Thessaloniki International Film Festival on 8 November 2025.

== Reception ==
On the AlloCiné, which lists 12 press reviews, the film obtained an average rating of 3.3/5.

=== Accolades ===
Award	Ceremony date	Category	Recipient(s)	Result	Ref(s)
Lumière Awards	20 January 2025	Best Animated Film	Maya, Give Me a Title	Nominated	
Berlin International Film Festival	23 February 2025	Generation Kplus Crystal Bear for the Best Film	Michel Gondry	Won	
