= Rochelle Gadd =

British actress (born 1980)

- Born: August 20, 1980 (age 46); London, UK
- Occupation: Actress
- Years active: 1994–
- Television: Grange Hill; The Story of Tracy Beaker; Hollyoaks

Rochelle Gadd (born 20 August 1980) is a British actress. Gadd initially portrayed Dill Lodge in Grange Hill before appearing in the short film Black XXX-Mas. After a guest appearance on Casualty, Gadd then portrayed regular character Adele Azupadi and Olivia Johnson in the television shows The Story of Tracy Beaker and Hollyoaks, respectively. From 2007 to 2008, Gadd appeared in the stage production of Looking for JJ. Gadd has also appeared in various other productions, such as 15 Storeys High, Manchild, French and Saunders, The Robinsons, The Life and Times of Vivienne Vyle, Doctors and Suspicion

== Life and career ==
Rochelle Gadd was born on 20 August 1980 in London. Gadd starred as Delia "Dill" Lodge in the British children's television drama series Grange Hill. Gadd portrayed the role of Little Red in the short film Black XXX-Mas. In 2000, Gadd guest-starred in an episode of the British medical drama Casualty. Gadd portrayed series regular Adele Azupadi in the first and second series of the children's television series The Story of Tracy Beaker. Her character was the oldest foster child in the series.

Between 2002 and 2005, Gadd made guest appearances in 15 Storeys High, Manchild, French and Saunders and The Robinsons. Gadd portrayed regular character Olivia Johnson in the Channel 4 soap opera Hollyoaks. She made her first appearance in the episode airing on 3 October 2005. Gadd left the role in 2006 when Olivia was one of five character to be killed-off in a pub explosion; the stunt was part of new executive producer Bryan Kirkwood's plan to "revamp" the soap.

In 2007, Gadd portrayed Dionne in the British sitcom The Life and Times of Vivienne Vyle. From 2007 to 2008, Gadd portrayed Lucy in the stage adaptation of Anne Cassidy's novel Looking for JJ, which was co-produced by Pilot Theatre in partnership with Unicorn Theatre, London and York Theatre Royal. Cecily Boys from British Theatre Guide praised Gadd and her colleague Louisa Kempton for their performance in the play, opining that the pair "enliven the best scenes as 10 year olds, without 'dumbing down' their performances". Gadd guest-starred in an episode of the British soap opera Doctors, which was broadcast on 2 February 2010. Gadd played a minor role in the television series Suspicion. Gadd has also had various other roles in other productions, such as The Bill, Doctor Who, Obsession: Dark Desires, Twisted Tales and others.

== Acting credits ==
=== Selected filmography ===
Year	Title	Role	Notes	Ref.
1994–2000	Grange Hill	Dill Lodge	Series regular	
1999	Black XXX-Mas	Little Red	Short film	
2000	Casualty	Eliza Dunn	1 episode	
2002	15 Storeys High	Miss Rednapp	1 episode ("Dead Swan")	
2002–03	The Story of Tracy Beaker	Adele Azupadi	Series regular (Series 1 and series 2)	
2003	Manchild	Audition Receptionist	1 episode ("Episode Six")	
2004	French and Saunders	Ensemble Actor	1 episode ("Episode Six")	
2005	The Robinsons	Bakery girl	1 episode ("Episode Two")	
2005–06	Hollyoaks	Olivia Johnson	Series regular	
2007	The Life and Times of Vivienne Vyle	Dionne	British sitcom	
2010	Doctors	Sian Morris	1 episode ("Mr Donormight")	
2015	Suspicion	—N/a	6 episodes	

=== Theatre ===
Year	Production	Venue	Role	Ref.
2007–08	Looking for JJ	Various	Lucy	
