= The Science of Sleep =

2006 film by Michel Gondry

- Theatrical release poster
- Directed by: Michel Gondry
- Written by: Michel Gondry
- Produced by: Georges Bermann
- Starring: Gael García Bernal; Charlotte Gainsbourg; Miou-Miou; Alain Chabat
- Cinematography: Jean-Louis Bompoint
- Edited by: Juliette Welfling
- Music by: Jean-Michel Bernard
- Production companies: Partizan Films; France 3 Cinéma; Canal+ TPS Star
- Distributed by: Gaumont (France; through Gaumont Columbia TriStar Films); Mikado Film (Italy)
- Release dates: 22 January 2006 (Sundance); 16 August 2006 (France); 26 January 2007 (Italy)
- Running time: 106 minutes
- Countries: France; Italy
- Languages: English; French; Spanish
- Budget: $6 million
- Box office: $15.3 million

The Science of Sleep (French: La Science des rêves, literally The Science of Dreams) is a 2006 surrealistic science fantasy comedy film written and directed by Michel Gondry. Starring Gael García Bernal, Charlotte Gainsbourg, Miou-Miou and Alain Chabat, the film stems from a bedtime story written by Sam Mounier, then 10 years old.

== Plot ==
Stéphane Miroux is a shy young man whose vivid dreams often interfere with his waking life. After the death of his divorced father in Mexico, Stéphane moves to Paris to live closer to his mother Christine. He moves into his childhood home and starts a new job his mother has found for him in a calendar printing company.

Stéphane had been told it was a creative job and shows his new colleagues his drawings, a collection of twelve illustrations depicting unique disasters. He calls his collection "disasterology". But nobody at his new job appreciates his talents – the job is no more than typesetting work, leaving him frustrated, as revealed in his dreams.

While leaving his apartment to go to work one day, the new neighbor Stéphanie invites him into her apartment; he soon realizes that she is creative and artistic. They plan a project together, a short animated film based around a boat Stéphanie was making.

As the story begins to unfold, surrealistic and naturalistic elements begin to overlap within Stéphane's reality, and the viewer is often uncertain of which portions constitute reality and which are dreams. One dream sequence, in which Stéphane dreams his hands become absurdly giant, was inspired by a recurring nightmare director Michel Gondry had as a child. As the line between dream and reality gradually becomes more blurred, Stéphane becomes enamoured with Stéphanie, and he shares his inventions with her, such as the 'one-second time machine'. Stéphane's dreams begin to encroach on his waking life, making him unsure of reality and whether Stéphanie's feelings for him are real.

Stéphanie's toy horse is named Golden The Pony Boy, a reference to The Outsiders, the meaning poignantly hinting at Stèphane's regression and childlike behaviour around Stéphanie, which could stem from the loss of his father. He implants a mechanism inside Golden the Pony Boy that will make it gallop. He later receives a call from Stéphanie thanking him; she reveals the pony was named after him.

To Stéphane's surprise, the calendar manufacturer accepts his "disasterology" idea and the company has a party in his honor, but he begins drinking excessively after he witnesses Stéphanie dancing with another man. The next day, the two have a confrontation in their hallway when Stéphane announces that he does not want to be Stéphanie's friend any longer. Stéphanie offers to discuss their issues on a date, but on his way there Stéphane has a vision that she is not there. He runs to her apartment and bangs on her door, when in actuality, she is waiting for him at the café. Stéphanie returns home, while Stéphane decides to move back to Mexico.

Before leaving, Stéphane's mother insists that he says a formal goodbye to his next-door neighbor, Stéphanie. In his attempt to do so, he becomes crass, making offensive jokes. As his antagonistic behaviour pushes her, Stéphanie asks Stéphane to leave but he climbs into her bed, noticing two items on her bedside: his one-second time machine, and the finished boat they planned to use in their animated film. The film closes with Stéphane and Stéphanie riding Golden the Pony Boy across a field before sailing off into the sea in her boat.

== Cast ==
- Gael García Bernal as Stéphane Miroux, a shy and creative young man who moves to Paris to accompany his mother. His mother gets him a job at a calendar printing company in France. He becomes interested in his next-door neighbor, Stéphanie, who is also a creative and artistic individual like himself.
- Charlotte Gainsbourg as Stéphanie, Stéphane's next door neighbor. She is an artist who works at an art supply store with her friend, Zoe. Uninterested in playing romantic games, she is reserved yet taken with Stéphane. She seems aloof but caring, which keeps the viewer guessing about her feelings.
- Miou-Miou as Christine Miroux, the mother of Stéphane Miroux. She is the landlord of Stéphane's neighbor, Stéphanie. She is also a teacher and has a boyfriend.
- Alain Chabat as Guy, Stéphane's sex obsessed co-worker, who often gives Stéphane advice and covers for him when he misses work.
- Emma de Caunes as Zoé, Stéphanie's work friend who Stéphane is initially attracted to.
- Sacha Bourdo as Serge, Stéphane's co-worker at the calendar printing company.
- Aurélia Petit as Martine, Stéphane's co-worker at the calendar printing company.
- Pierre Vaneck as Monsieur Pouchet Stéphane's boss

== Production ==
The film was written and directed by Michel Gondry, marking his third feature film. It was produced by Georges Bermann, Michel Gondry, and Frédéric Junqua. Cinematography was by Jean-Louis Bompoint, who is also known for doing cinematography for The Thorn in the Heart (2009) and New York, I Love You (2008). It was shot on spherical lens.

== Release and reception ==
The Science of Sleep premiered at the Sundance Film Festival on January 22, 2006, with a bidding war involving multiple studios ensuing shortly after. Paramount Classics offered $7 million for worldwide rights, but Gaumont, unwilling to relinquish all international rights to the film, immediately rejected the offer. Focus Features, which had previously distributed Gondry's Eternal Sunshine of the Spotless Mind, offered less than $5 million as well as a percentage of the film's box office gross, arguing that a smaller advance was justified as they would do a better job at marketing the film; Fox Searchlight Pictures also offered more than $6 million. Ultimately, on January 24, Warner Independent Pictures acquired North American and U.K. distribution rights to the film for $6 million, releasing the film on September 22, 2006 in the United States and February 16, 2007 in the United Kingdom. The film was released in France on August 16, 2006 and in Italy on January 26, 2007. The film grossed $15.1 million worldwide, including $4.7 million in the US.

The Science of Sleep received generally favorable reviews. On the review aggregator website Rotten Tomatoes, 71% of 164 critics' reviews are positive. The website's consensus reads: "Lovely and diffuse, Sleep isn't as immediately absorbing as Gondry's previous work, but its messy beauty is its own reward." Metacritic, which uses a weighted average, assigned the film a score of 70 out of 100, based on 33 critics, indicating "generally favorable" reviews.

In a New York Times article , A.O. Scott, an American journalist and cultural critic, describes the film as "profoundly idiosyncratic" and "so confident in its oddity" that any attempt to describe and explain the film would be misleading. He later states, "What I'm trying to say is that 'The Science of Sleep,' for all its blithe disregard of the laws of physics, film grammar and narrative coherence, strikes me as perfectly realistic, as authentic a slice of life as I've encountered on screen in quite some time." Scott argues that the film's loose connection of events and misleading narrative are appropriate for its themes: "Plot summary, therefore, is both irrelevant and impossible. Which is not to say that the movie lacks a story, only that, like a dream, the narrative moves sideways as well as forward, revising and contradicting itself as it goes along. Mr. Gondry, who would rather invent than explain, makes a plausible case that a love story (which is what "The Science of Sleep" is) cannot really be told any other way. Love is too bound up with memories, fantasies, projections and misperceptions to conform to a conventional, linear structure."

Many other critics have stated that the film's plot is hard to understand, but Gondry's grasp of emotions and visuals is what makes the story unique and profound.

Awards

- 2008 BBC Four World Cinema Awards (Nominated), BBC Four World Cinema Award
- 2008 Gopo Awards, Romania. (Nominated), Gopos Award Best European Film
- 2007 Cannes Film Festival (Won), UCMF Film Music Award
- 2007 Chlotrudis Awards (Nominated), Chlotrudis Award Best Supporting Actress
- 2007 Golden Trailer Awards (Won), Golden Trailer Best Independent
- 2007 Russian National Movie Awards (Nominated), Georges Award Best Independent Movie
- 2007 World Soundtrack Awards (Nominated), World Soundtrack Award Discovery of the Year Jean-Michel Bernard
- 2006 European Film Awards (Won), European Film Award Best Artistic Contribution Stéphane Rozenbaum, Pierre Pell For the production design.
- 2006 Sitges - Catalonian International Film Festival (Won), Audience Award Michel Gondry (Nominated), Best Film Michel Gondry
- 2006 St. Louis Film Critics Association, US (Nominated), SLFCA Award Most Original, Innovative or Creative Film

== Soundtrack ==
The score to The Science of Sleep was composed by Jean-Michel Bernard. Jean-Michel Bernard is a French pianist, composer, educator, orchestrator, and music producer. He is also well known for regularly writing, performing, and scoring film soundtracks. The song "Instinct Blues" by The White Stripes is used in the film but was not included on the soundtrack release. The song "If You Rescue Me", played by a band of people dressed as cats in a dream sequence, has the melody of the song "After Hours" by the Velvet Underground but with different lyrics.

== See also ==
- Dream
- Lucid dreaming
- Dream argument
- False awakening
- Hallucinations in the sane
