= Clyde Henry Productions =

Canadian animation studio

Clyde Henry Productions is a Canadian film, stop-motion animation, puppetry and illustration firm consisting of Chris Lavis and Maciek Szczerbowski. Formed in 1997, the team is responsible for the animated shorts Madame Tutli-Putli, winner of the Genie Award for Best Animated Short, and Higglety Pigglety Pop! or There Must Be More to Life, both co-produced with the National Film Board of Canada (NFB).

== Background ==
Clyde Henry Productions began by designing puppets and illustrating for various clients, including Vice Magazine, for whom they produce a monthly comic strip called The Untold Tales of Yuri Gagarin. In March 2000, they signed a worldwide representation agreement with Toronto's Spin Productions.

== Film career ==
Lavis and Szczerbowski's film debut was the stop-motion animated puppet film Madame Tutli-Putli produced by the National Film Board of Canada, which they both worked on from 2002 to 2007. For the first time in the history of animated film, the puppets had “real” eyes that were digitally inserted. The groundbreaking technique was credited to painter Jason Walker, who was responsible for the visual special effects of the film. Lavis and Szczerbowski were nominated for an Academy Award for Best Animated Short Film in 2008.

They won the Juno Award for Recording Package of the Year in 2016 after working as art directors/designers/illustrators/photographers on the album "Lost Voices" by Esmerine.

In 2016, they created two animated vignettes for the NFB satirical public service announcement series, Naked Island.

Their recent film, The Girl Who Cried Pearls (La jeune fille qui pleurait des perles), was released in 2025, and won the award for Best Canadian Short Film at the 2025 Toronto International Film Festival, as well as the Academy Award for Best Animated Short Film.
