= Manuel Gervink =

German musicologist and scholar (born 1957)

Manuel Gervink (born 29 May 1957) is a German musicologist and scholar who has worked at the Universities of Cologne and Dresden.

== Life ==
Born in Münster, Gervink graduated from Gymnasium in 1976. From 1976 to 1984 he studied musicology, German language and literature and philosophy at the University of Münster, where he received his doctorate in 1984. From 1984 he worked for ten years as a research assistant at the Musicological Institute of the University of Cologne. From 1995 to 1999, he was professor for musicology at the Musikhochschule Köln. In 2000 he was appointed professor at the University of Cologne.

In 2002 Gervink was appointed Professor of Musicology at the Hochschule für Musik Carl Maria von Weber as Director of the Institute of Musicology. His main focus is the field of Contemporary classical music.

== Publications ==
- Die Symphonie in Deutschland und Österreich in der Zeit zwischen den beiden Weltkriegen, Regensburg 1984
- Die musikalisch-poetischen Renaissancebestrebungen des 16. Jahrhunderts in Frankreich und ihre Bedeutung für die Entwicklung einer nationalen französischen Musiktradition, Frankfurt 1996
- Arnold Schönberg und seine Zeit, Laaber 2000
- Dmitri Schostakovisch – das Spätwerk und sein zeitgeschichtlicher Kontext, Dresden: Sandstein Verlag 2006 (Published together with Jörn Peter Hiekel)
- Robert Schumanns Welten, Dresden: Sandstein Verlag 2007 (Published together with Jörn Peter Hiekel)
