= Madame Tutli-Putli =

- Madame Tutli-Putli reading on the train
- Directed by: Chris Lavis; Maciek Szczerbowski
- Produced by: Marcy Page
- Starring: Laurie Maher
- Music by: Jean-Frédéric Messier; Set Fire to Flames
- Distributed by: National Film Board of Canada (NFB)
- Release date: 2007
- Running time: 17 minutes
- Country: Canada

Madame Tutli-Putli is a 2007 stop motion-animated short film by Montreal filmmakers Chris Lavis and Maciek Szczerbowski, collectively known as Clyde Henry Productions, and produced by the National Film Board of Canada (NFB). It is available on the Cinema16: World Short Films DVD and from the NFB.

== Plot ==
Madame Tutli-Putli boards a night train with her many belongings. She encounters a number of eccentric characters: two men playing chess while seated in their suitcases; a small, Asian boy and his sleeping grandfather; and a famous tennis player, whose crass sexual overtures Madame Tutli-Putli rejects. She falls asleep and awakens to darkness. She quickly remembers two train robbers emitting a powerful sleeping gas into the air, then stealing the tennis player's kidneys. Frightened, she attempts to flee. While running through the train towards its conductor, she notices a moth. She follows the moth, perhaps hoping it will lead her to an escape route, but as she follows it, it leads her to a fluorescent light within the train. Her fate is left unknown.

== Research and production ==
The filmmakers researched the film by traveling on The Canadian, north of Lake Superior, living on the train for two weeks, collecting stories. The stop motion animation took them more than five years. Critics lauded the film for its groundbreaking stop-motion animation techniques. Portrait artist Jason Walker created the technique of adding composited human eyes to the stop motion puppets. For the lead character, actress Laurie Maher was recorded acting out the motions, but only her eyes and eyebrows were ultimately visible in the final film.

During the production of the climactic scene, the character's pearl necklace broke and scattered across the set, which would serve as the initial inspiration for Lavis and Szczerbowski's 2025 film The Girl Who Cried Pearls (La jeune fille qui pleurait des perles).

== Awards ==
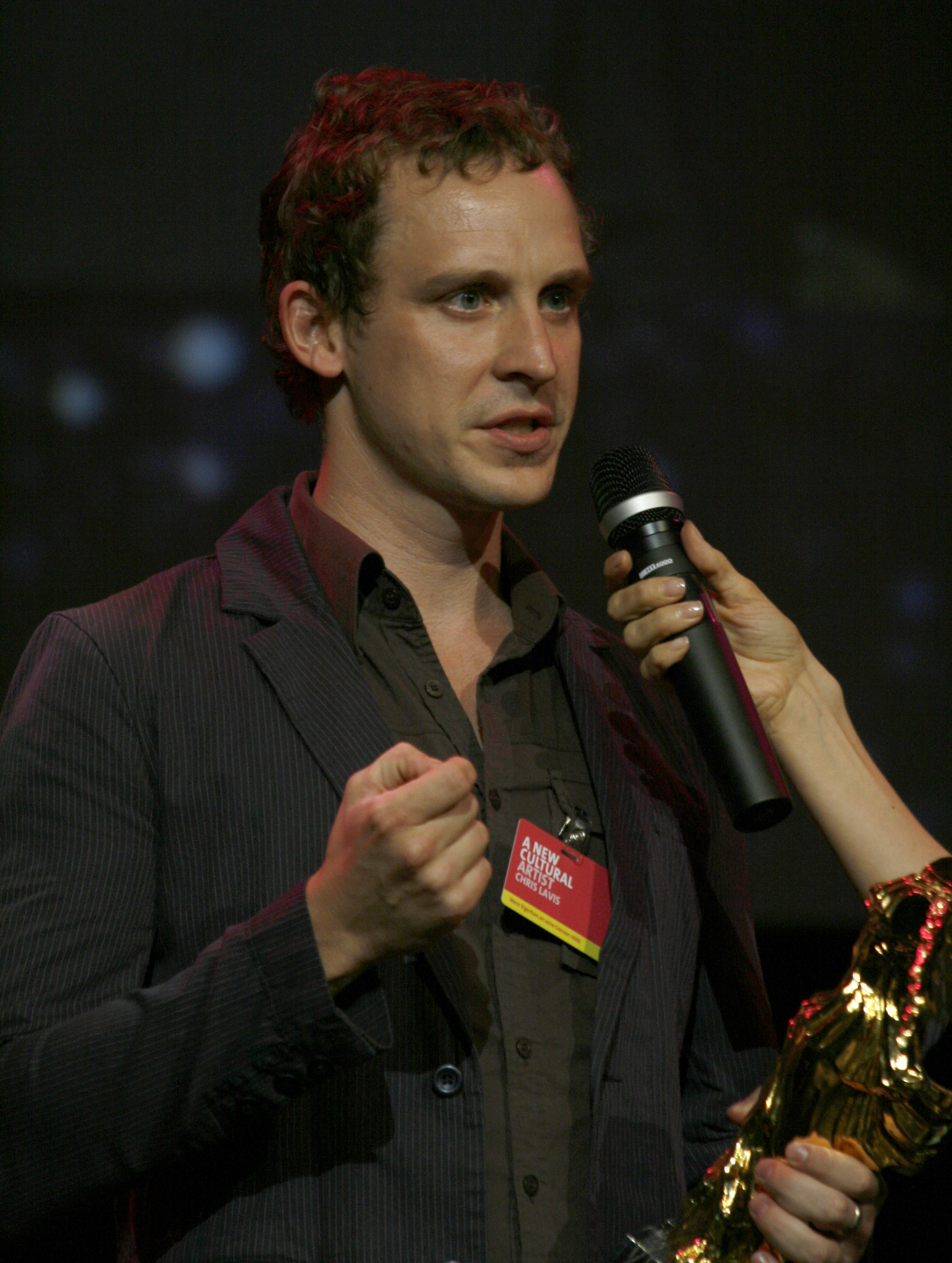
Chris Lavis at the Prix Ars Electronica 2008

On May 28, 2007, the film won the Canal + Grand Prize for best short film along with the Petit Rail d'Or, chosen by a "group of 100 cinephile railwaymen," at the 2007 Cannes Film Festival. In June 2007, Madame Tutli-Putli won best animated short at the CFC Worldwide Short Film Festival in Toronto, qualifying it for Academy Award consideration. It received an Oscar nomination in January 2008.

In late June 2008, Madame Tutli-Putli won the "Best of the Festival" award at the Melbourne International Animation Festival. At the Ars Electronica Festival 2008 Chris Lavis received a Golden Nica in the category "Computer Animation/Film/VFX" of the Prix Ars Electronica. Madame Tutli-Putli received the Academy of Canadian Cinema and Television Award for Best Animated Short at the 28th Genie Awards. It was also included in the Animation Show of Shows.

== "NFB at the Oscars" contest and promotion ==
In early 2008, before the 80th Academy Awards, the NFB began a promotion campaign entitled "NFB at the Oscars", commemorating the 12 awards and 70 nominations that NFB productions have received. To celebrate the nomination of Madame Tutli-Putli for Best Animated Short Film, the NFB announced that it would make the film freely available for viewing online, but with a caveat—each of the 23,287 frames had to first be unlocked, one by each visitor from a unique IP address. Once the entire film was unlocked, it was made available for viewing at CBC.ca.
