= Maite Carranza =

Spanish writer and educator (born 1958)

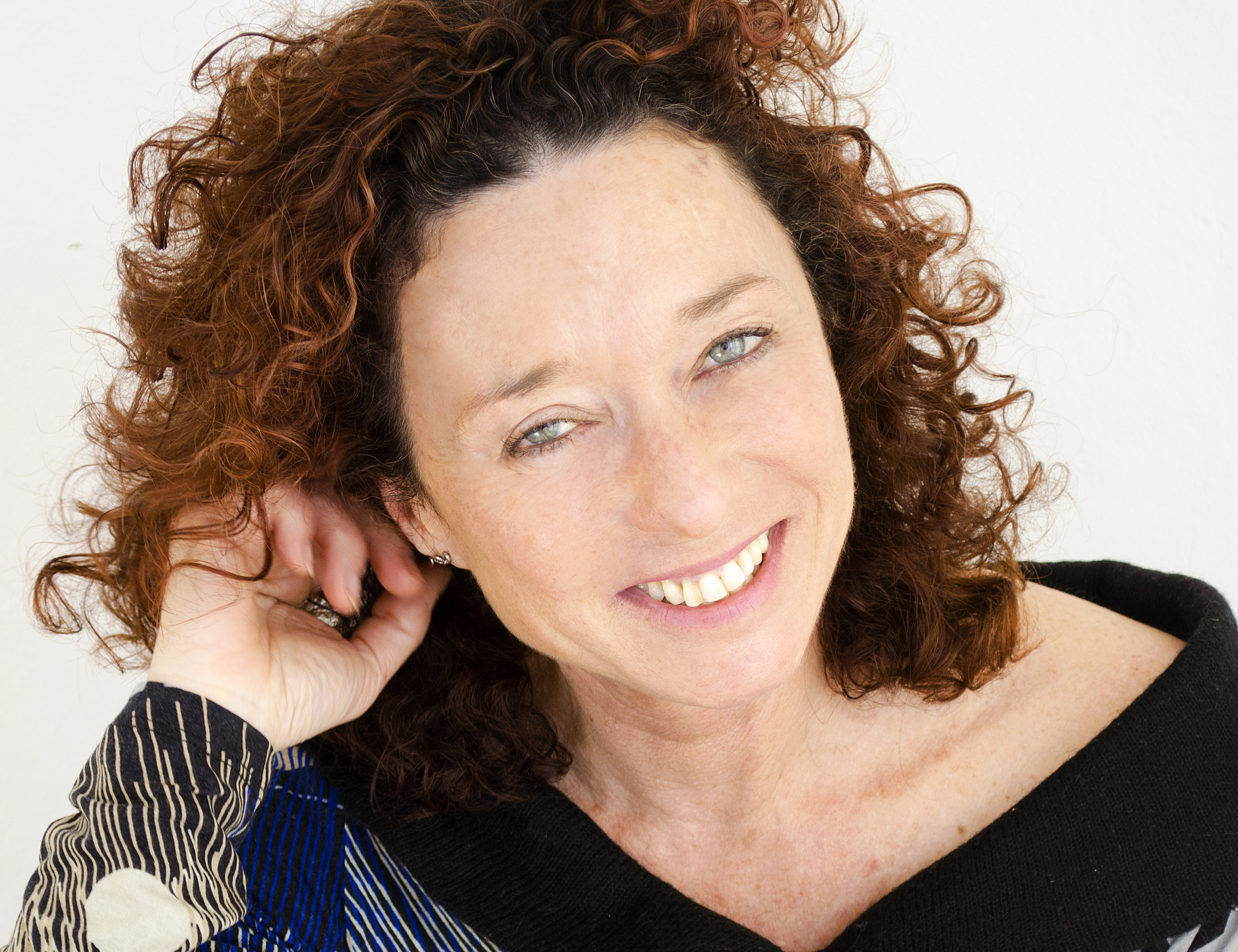
- Born: 25 February 1958 (age 68); Barcelona, Spain
- Writing career
- Genres: youth literature, screenwriting

Maite Carranza Gil-Dolz del Castellar (born 25 February 1958) is a Spanish writer and educator, mainly writing in Catalan. She is a recipient of the Premio Crítica Serra d'Or, TP de Oro award, Premio Ondas award, and the Spanish National Prize for Children's and Juvenile Literature.

== Biography ==
She was born in Barcelona. She completed studies in anthropology in 1980 and then taught secondary school for the next ten years. Carranza published her first novel Ostres, tu, quin cacau! In 1986; it was awarded the Premio Crítica Serra d'Or for children's and juvenile literature. Her bestseller Trilogía de las Brujas ("Trilogy of Witches") has been translated into more than twenty languages. In 1999, she wrote her first novel for adults Sin invierno, which was also her first work in Spanish.

She completed a master's degree in Audiovisual Writing during the 1990s. In 1992, Carranza began writing scripts for television. She has written a number of successful soap operas for TV3, including Poble Nou, Secrets de família and Nissaga de poder. Poble Nou received the TP de Oro award. Another series which she wrote, Pinnic, received a Premio Ondas award. Carranza also began teaching screenwriting at the Autonomous University of Barcelona.

In 2011, she won the Spanish National Prize for Children's and Juvenile Literature for her novel Paraules emmetzinades ("Poisoned words"), which was inspired by the abduction of Natascha Kampusch. The book is believed to be the first work for Spanish youth to deal with the subject of sexual abuse of children in a direct manner. In 2014, she received the Premi Cervantes Chico de literatura infantil i juvenil for her work.
