= Shaddy Safadi =

American video game concept artist (born 1979)

- Born: 1979 (age 46–47); United States
- Education: Art Center College of Design (BFA)
- Occupations: Concept artist, Art director
- Years active: 2001–present
- Employer: One Pixel Brush
- Known for: Co-founding One Pixel Brush; work on Uncharted and The Last of Us
- Notable work: Uncharted: Drake’s Fortune, Uncharted 2: Among Thieves, The Last of Us
- Title: Art Director

Shaddy Safadi (born 1979) is an American video game concept artist who is the co-founder of One Pixel Brush, a concept firm headquartered in Santa Monica.

== Early life ==
Safadi was born with a passionate drive to become an artist for entertainment at a young age, though he was also interested in basketball. Applying to art colleges, he was turned down only by one school which was Art Center College of Design. Safadi was driven to be accepted into Art Center and took a year off work to improve his portfolio. After some time Safadi was finally accepted into Art Center for Illustration/Entertainment but at the time he lacked the focus and work ethic to build a strong portfolio once graduating school. Safadi also at the time had a negative outlook as well as having trouble with cooperating with others but graduated from Art Center with a BFA in 2002. After graduation Safadi moved back to Northern California and started working at an Italian restaurant which took a hit on his morale. Deciding to practice more and work harder on his free time Safadi was finally able to get a job offer from Idol Mind Studio.

== Career ==
In 2003, Safadi began working at Idol Minds Studio in Colorado on Neopets, and stayed with the studio for 2 years, creating the look and style of the PS2 title Neopets: The Darkest Faerie. He later got an offer from a friend at the Game Developers Conference whom extended an offer at Naughty Dog. Working on an art test for what would be the Uncharted series, Shaddy was turned down but was given a second offer to work on the new Jak and Daxter title. The title would eventually be canceled and was offered to now work on the Uncharted title, producing sketches, style guides and detailed digital paintings which helped establish lighting, and color. Starting as a concept artist, Safadi had a difficult time adjusting to the realistic style of Uncharted, and was nearly taken off the Naughty Dog team. Safadi would learn to embrace the new style after playing Uncharted: Drake’s Fortune for the first time and understood the overall vision of the game. He then began working on Uncharted 2: Among Thieves and was able to work on character concepts for Drake, Chloe, Tenzin, Elena and the Guardians. As well as creating set piece paintings for the game which involved working closely with the art director, and the game director.

Safadi also worked on 2013 title The Last of Us and helped create the key shots in the game. He would soon leave Naughty Dog to pursue building his company and co-found One Pixel Brush, a company that focused on creating AAA concepts for the top names in the industry as well as indie studios. Safadi now works as an Art Director at One Pixel Brush, which works with a number of AAA studios, such as Respawn Entertainment, Blur Studios, Ubisoft, Infinity Ward, Riot Games, BioWare, Naughty Dog, Irrational Games, Treyarch, Crytek.

== Titles released ==
Year	Title	Studio	Role			
April 2001	Jurassic Park III	Savage Entertainment	Concept Artist			
April–July 2003	Dungeons and Dragons	Stormfront Studios	Concept Artist			
September 2003 - 2006	Neopets: The Darkest Faerie	Idol Minds	Uncharted: Drake's Fortune	Naughty Dogs	Uncharted 2 Among ThievesNaughty Dog	Senior Concept Artist
September 2006 - February 2011	The Last of Us	Naughty Dog	Senior Concept Artist			
