= The Thorn in the Heart =

2009 film

- Film poster
- Directed by: Michel Gondry
- Written by: Michel Gondry
- Produced by: Georges Bermann
- Cinematography: Jean-Louis Bompoint
- Production company: Partizan Films
- Release date: May 2009
- Running time: 85 minutes
- Country: France
- Language: French
- Box office: $17,849

The Thorn in the Heart (French: L'épine dans le coeur) is a 2009 French documentary film directed by Michel Gondry. It was given a special screening at the 2009 Cannes Film Festival and was also screened at the Sheffield Doc/Fest.

== Synopsis ==
The film is a documentary look at the director's family at home in the Cévennes, particularly his aunt Suzette.

== Cast ==
- Suzette Gondry as herself
- Jean-Yves Gondry as himself
- Michel Gondry as himself
