= Michel Gondry =

French film director

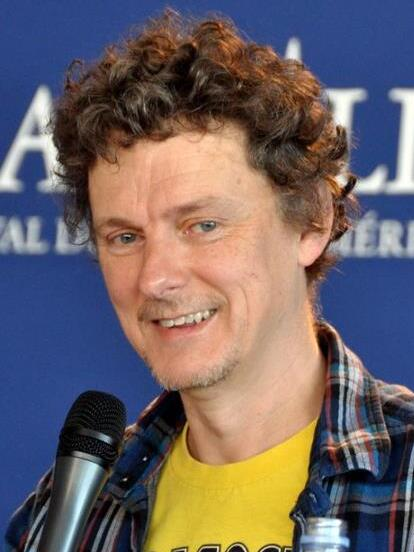
- Gondry in 2012
- Born: Versailles, France
- Occupations: Director; screenwriter; producer; record producer
- Years active: 1986–present

Michel Gondry (French: [miʃɛl ɡɔ̃dʁi]) is a French filmmaker and producer. He is known for directing the 2004 film Eternal Sunshine of the Spotless Mind, which he co-wrote with Charlie Kaufman, winning an Academy Award for Best Original Screenplay. His other films include the music documentary Dave Chappelle's Block Party (2005), the surrealistic science fantasy comedy The Science of Sleep (2006), the comedy Be Kind Rewind (2008), the superhero comedy The Green Hornet (2011), the drama The We and the I (2012), and the romantic science fantasy tragedy Mood Indigo (2013).

Gondry has directed numerous music videos, including Björk's "Human Behaviour" in 1993 and "Bachelorette" in 1997, both of which earned him nominations for the Grammy Award for Best Music Video. He also directed several videos for The White Stripes. He is also a record producer, most notably producing several tracks for American rapper and illustrator MC Paul Barman on his 2009 album Thought Balloon Mushroom Cloud.

== Early life and education ==
Michel Gondry is from Versailles. He is the grandson of inventor Constant Martin.

He attended art school in Paris. While studying there, he formed the band Oui Oui, for which he was the drummer.

== Career ==
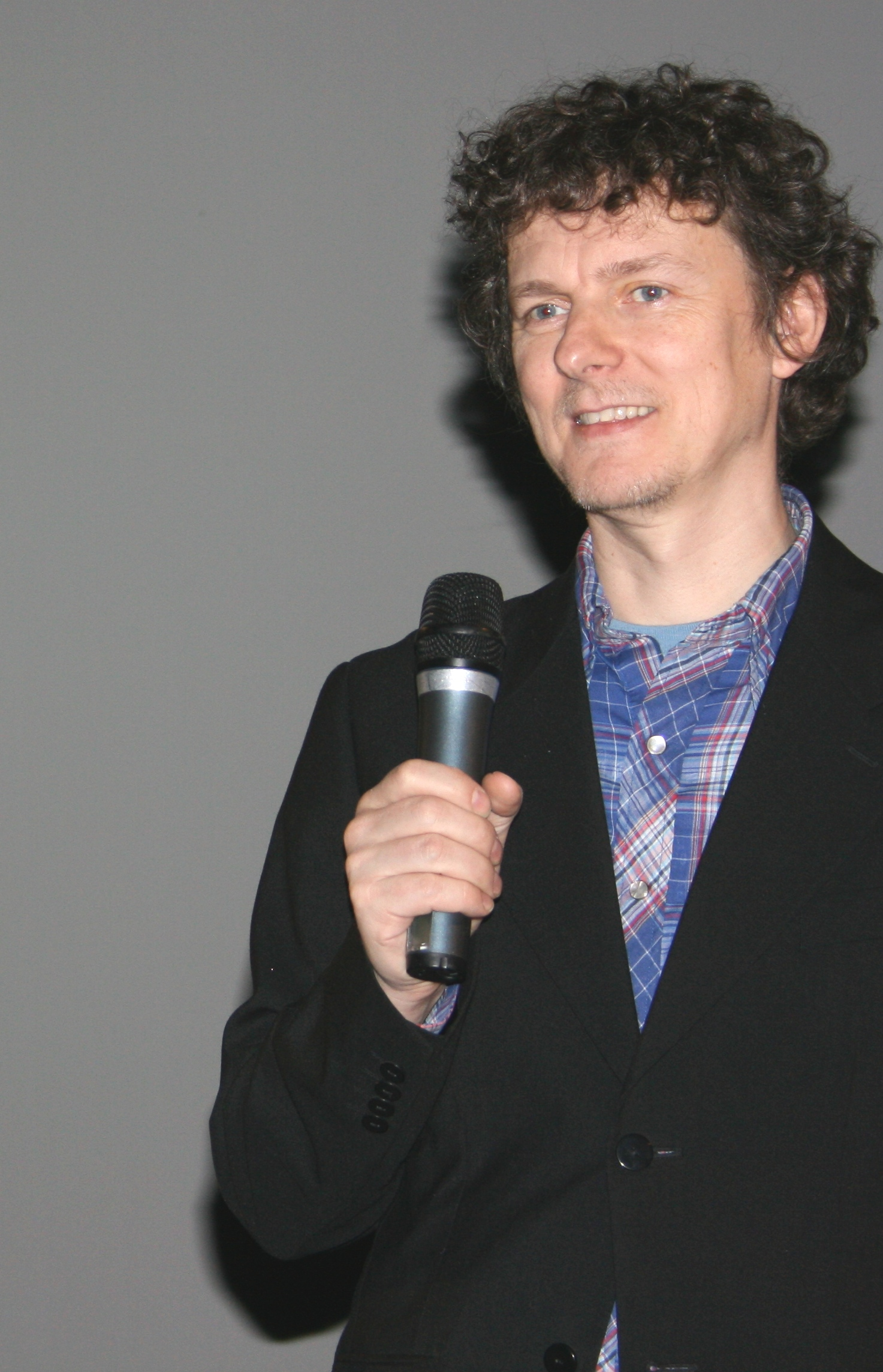
Gondry in 2008

Gondry's vision and career began with his emphasis on emotion. Much of his inspiration, he says, came from the 1960 French family film Le voyage en ballon. He became known for his inventive visual style and distinctive manipulation of mise en scène.

=== Music videos ===
Gondry's career as a filmmaker began with creating music videos for the French rock band Oui Oui, in which he also served as a drummer. The style of his videos for Oui Oui caught the attention of music artist Björk, who asked him to direct the video for her song "Human Behaviour". The collaboration proved long-lasting, with Gondry directing a total of eight music videos for Björk. In 1994 his "Human Behaviour" video earned him a nomination for the Grammy Award for Best Music Video; "Bachelorette" earned another nomination in 1997.

Other artists who have collaborated with Gondry on more than one occasion include Daft Punk, the White Stripes, the Chemical Brothers, the Vines, Steriogram, Radiohead, and Beck. Gondry's video for Lucas Secon's "Lucas with the Lid Off" was nominated in the Best Music Video (short form) category at the 37th Grammy Awards,

Gondry directed the music video for the Paul McCartney song "Dance Tonight", in which he makes a cameo appearance.

In 2014, Gondry produced the video for Metronomy's single "Love Letters", taken from the album of the same name.

=== TV commercials ===
Gondry has also created numerous television commercials. He pioneered the "bullet time" technique later adapted in The Matrix in the 1996 "Smarienberg" commercial for Smirnoff vodka, as well as directing a trio of inventive holiday-themed advertisements for clothing retailer Gap.

According to the 2004 Guinness World Records, Gondry's Levi's 501 Jeans "Drugstore" spot held the record for "Most awards won by a TV commercial".

=== Films ===
Gondry made his feature film debut in 2001 with Human Nature, garnering mixed reviews. His second film, Eternal Sunshine of the Spotless Mind (also his second collaboration with screenwriter Charlie Kaufman), was released in 2004 and received very favourable reviews, becoming one of the most critically acclaimed films of the year. Eternal Sunshine utilises many of the image manipulation techniques that Gondry had experimented with in his music videos. Gondry won an Academy Award alongside Kaufman and Pierre Bismuth for the screenplay of Eternal Sunshine. The style of Gondry's music videos often relies on videography and camera tricks which play with frames of reference.

Gondry directed the musical documentary Dave Chappelle's Block Party (2006) which followed comedian Dave Chappelle as he attempted to hold a large, free concert in the Bedford-Stuyvesant neighbourhood of Brooklyn, New York. His following film, The Science of Sleep, was released in 2006. This film stars Mexican actor Gael García Bernal, and marked a return to the fantastical, surreal techniques he employed in Eternal Sunshine.

He was asked by French comic duet Éric and Ramzy to direct Seuls Two, but declined; by his suggestion, Éric and Ramzy subsequently asked Mr Oizo to direct another movie, Steak.

Interior Design, one third of the 2008 anthology film Tokyo!, was next for Gondry. Interior Design was based on the comic book "Cecil and Jordan in New York" by Gabrielle Bell but was adapted from New York City to Tokyo for the film.

In 2009, The Thorn in the Heart, another feature documentary, was released, it is about Michel's aunt Suzette and her son Jean-Yves. In 2011, Gondry directed The Green Hornet, a superhero film by Sony starring Seth Rogen, Jay Chou and Christoph Waltz; Rogen co-wrote the script. In 2011, he was the head of the jury for the short film competition at the 2011 Cannes Film Festival.

His film The We and the I was selected to be screened in the Directors' Fortnight section at the 2012 Cannes Film Festival.

On 3 January 2013, Gondry released an animated short Haircut Mouse on his official Vimeo channel. In February 2013, he released a hand-drawn animated documentary on famed linguist Noam Chomsky, Is the Man Who is Tall Happy?.

In April 2013, he directed Mood Indigo, based upon Boris Vian's 1947 novel Froth on the Daydream.

In 2015 his feature film Microbe & Gasoline was released, a smaller scale endeavour after the troubled production of Mood Indigo. The latter also served as inspiration for 2023's The Book of Solutions.

In 2024, his first animated feature-length film, Maya, Give Me a Title was released. His daughter, Maya Gondry, voiced herself in the film, and Pierre Niney voiced a character in the film. It also has a short live-action sequence.

=== TV series ===
In 2009 Gondry directed "Unnatural Love", the fifth episode in season two of HBO's Flight of the Conchords.

=== Visual art ===
In September 2006, Gondry made his debut as an installation artist at Deitch Projects in New York City's SoHo gallery district. The show, called "The Science of Sleep: An Exhibition of Sculpture and Pathological Creepy Little Gifts" featured props from his film, The Science of Sleep, as well as film clips and a selection of gifts that the artist had given to women he was interested in, many of them former or current collaborators, Karen Baird, Kishu Chand, Dorothy Barrick and Lauri Faggioni. A leitmotif of the film is a 'Disastrology' calendar; Gondry commissioned the painter Baptiste Ibar to draw harrowing images of natural and human disasters.

Gondry was an artist in residence at the Massachusetts Institute of Technology in 2005 and 2006.

== Other activities ==
In 2014, Gondry was selected as a member of the jury for the 64th Berlin International Film Festival.

== Personal life ==
His brother Olivier "Twist" Gondry is also a television commercial and music video director creating videos for bands such as The Stills, Hot Hot Heat, Daft Punk and The Vines.

He has a son named Paul and a daughter named Maya.

== Filmography ==
=== Feature films ===
==== Fiction ====
Year	Title			
Year	Title	Director	Writer	Notes
2001	Human Nature	Yes	No	
2004	Eternal Sunshine of the Spotless Mind	Yes	Story	Story co-written with Charlie Kaufman and Pierre Bismuth
2006	The Science of Sleep	Yes	Yes	Also producer
2008	Be Kind Rewind	Yes	Yes	Also producer
2011	The Green Hornet	Yes	No	
2012	The We and the I	Yes	Yes	Co-written with Paul Proch and Jeff Grimsha
2013	Mood Indigo	Yes	Yes	Co-written with Luc Bossi
2015	Microbe & Gasoline	Yes	Yes	
2023	The Book of Solutions	Yes	Yes	
2024	Maya, Give Me a Title	Yes	Yes	Also animator
Unreleased	Golden	Yes	No	The film was canceled during post-production

==== Documentary ====
Year	Title				
Year	Title	Director	Writer	Producer	Notes
2005	Dave Chappelle's Block Party	Yes	No	Yes	
2008	How to Blow Up a Helicopter (Ayako's Story)	Yes	No	No	Documentary short
2009	The Thorn in the Heart	Yes	Yes	No	
2013	Is the Man Who Is Tall Happy?	Yes	Yes	Yes	Also animator and appears as himself

=== Short films ===
Year	Title			
Year	Title	Director	Writer	Notes
1986	L'expedition fatale	Yes	Yes	
1987	Jazzmosphère	Yes	No	
1988	My Brother's 24th Birthday	Yes	No	
1989	Vingt p'tites tours	Yes	No	
1998	La lettre	Yes	Yes	
2001	One Day...	Yes	Yes	Appears as "The Man"
2003	Pecan Pie	Yes	Yes	
2004	I've Been Twelve Forever	Yes	No	Appears as himself
2004	Ossamuch! – Kishu & Co	Yes	No	
2004	Tiny	Yes	Yes	
2004	Three Dead People	Yes	Yes	
2004	Drumb and Drumber	Yes	No	
2007	Michel Gondry Solves a Rubik's Cube with His Nose	Yes	Yes	
2008	Interior Design	Yes	Yes	Segment from Tokyo!
2013	Haircut Mouse	Yes	Yes	
2017	Détour	Yes	Yes	
2021	A Dozen Eggs	Yes	Yes	

=== Television ===
Year	Title			
Year	Title	Director	Executive Producer	Notes
2009	Flight of the Conchords	Yes	No	Episode: "Unnatural Love"
2011	Jimmy Kimmel Live!	Yes	No	Guest director
2018–2020	Kidding	Yes	Yes	Directed 8 episodes

=== Other releases ===
- The Work of Director Michel Gondry (2003)
- Michel Gondry 2: More Videos (Before and After DVD 1) (2009)

=== Music videos ===
- "Dô, l'enfant d'eau" – Jean-Luc Lahaye (1988)
- "Bolide" – Oui Oui (1988)
- "Un Joyeux Noël" – Oui Oui (1988)
- "Junior Et Sa Voix D'Or" – Oui Oui (1988)
- "Queen for a Day" – The Life of Riley (1989) (unreleased)
- "Tu rimes avec mon coeur" – Original MC (1989)
- "Les Cailloux" – Oui Oui (1989)
- "Il y a ceux" – l'Affaire Louis Trio (1989)
- "Ma Maison" – Oui Oui (1990)
- "Dad, laisse-moi conduire la Cad" – Peter & the Electro Kitsch Band (1991)
- "La normalité" – Les Objets (1991)
- "Sarah" – Les Objets (1991)
- "Two Worlds Collide" – Inspiral Carpets (1992)
- "Close but No Cigar" – Thomas Dolby (1992)
- "Paradoxal Système" – Laurent Voulzy (1992)
- "La Ville" – Oui Oui (1992)
- "How the West Was Won" – Energy Orchard (1992)
- "Les Voyages Immobiles" – Etienne Daho (1992)
- "Blow Me Down" – Mark Curry (1992)
- "Comme un ange (qui pleure)" – Les Wampas (1992)
- "This Is it (Your Soul)" – Hothouse Flowers (1993)
- "It's Too Real (Big Scary Animal)" – Belinda Carlisle (1993)
- "Human Behaviour" – Björk (1993)
- "Believe" – Lenny Kravitz (1993)
- "She Kissed Me" – Terence Trent D'Arby (1993)
- "Voila, Voila, Qu'ça r'Commence" – Rachid Taha (1993)
- "La main parisienne" – Malcolm McLaren, featuring Amina Annabi (1993) (unreleased)
- "Je Danse Le Mia" – IAM (1993)
- "Snowbound" – Donald Fagen (1993)
- "La Tour de Pise" – Jean François Coen (1993)
- "Hou! Mamma Mia" – Les Négresses Vertes (1993)
- "Come on sur mon scoot" – Peter & the Electro Kitsch Band (1993)
- "Les Jupes" – Robert (1992)
- "Fire on Babylon" – Sinéad O'Connor (1994)
- "Lucas with the Lid Off" – Lucas (1994)
- "Little Star" – Stina Nordenstam (1994)
- "Like a Rolling Stone" – The Rolling Stones (1995)
- "Isobel" – Björk (1995)
- "Protection" – Massive Attack (1995)
- "High Head Blues" – Black Crowes (1995)
- "Army of Me" – Björk (1995)
- "Sugar Water" – Cibo Matto (1996)
- "Hyper-Ballad" – Björk (1996)
- "Bachelorette" – Björk (1997)
- "Deadweight" – Beck (1997)
- "Jóga" – Björk (1997)
- "Everlong" – Foo Fighters (1997)
- "A Change Would Do You Good" – Sheryl Crow (1997)
- "Around the World" – Daft Punk (1997)
- "Feel It" – Neneh Cherry (1997)
- "Gimme Shelter" – The Rolling Stones (1998)
- "Another One Bites the Dust" – Wyclef Jean (1998)
- "Music Sounds Better with You" – Stardust (1998)
- "Let Forever Be" – The Chemical Brothers (1999)
- "Knives Out" – Radiohead (2001)
- "Mad World" – Michael Andrews and Gary Jules (2001)
- "Come into My World" – Kylie Minogue (2002)
- "A l'envers à l'endroit" – Noir Désir (2002)
- "No One Knows" – Queens of the Stone Age (2002) (co-directed with Dean Karr)
- "Dead Leaves and the Dirty Ground" – The White Stripes (2002)
- "Fell in Love with a Girl" – The White Stripes (2002)
- "Star Guitar" – The Chemical Brothers (2002)
- "The Hardest Button to Button" – The White Stripes (2003)
- "Behind" – Lacquer (2003)
- "Light & Day" (movie version) – The Polyphonic Spree (2004)
- "Winning Days" – The Vines (2004)
- "Mad World" (Donnie Darko soundtrack version) – Gary Jules (2004)
- "Ride" – The Vines (2004)
- "Walkie Talkie Man" – Steriogram (2004)
- "I Wonder" – The Willowz (2004)
- "A Ribbon" – Devendra Banhart (2004) (co-directed with Lauri Faggioni)
- "Heard 'Em Say" (U.S. Version) – Kanye West (2005)
- "The Denial Twist" – The White Stripes (2005)
- "Cellphone's Dead" – Beck (2006)
- "Anysound" – The Vines (2006)
- "King of the Game" – Cody ChesnuTT (2006)
- "Dance Tonight" – Paul McCartney (2007)
- "Limitless Undying Love" – Sergio Hiram (2007)
- "In Love with a Tornado" – Jihae (2007)
- "Declare Independence" – Björk (2007)
- "Soleil du Soir" – Dick Annegarn (2008)
- "Too Many Dicks on the Dancefloor" & "Carol Brown" (unofficial videos) – Flight of the Conchords (2009)
- "Open Your Heart" – Mia Doi Todd (2010)
- "Crystalline" – Björk (2011)
- "How Are You Doing?" – The Living Sisters (2011)
- "Love Letters" – Metronomy (2014)
- "Go" – The Chemical Brothers (2015)
- "City Lights" – The White Stripes (2016)
- "Got to Keep On" – The Chemical Brothers (2019)
- "Grand petit con" – -M- (2019)
- "Model Village" – Idles (2020) (co-directed with Olivier Gondry)
- "Chain Reactionary" – Adanowsky, Beck (2023)

=== Advertisements ===
- Adidas Aftershave – Released From Work
- Air France – Le Nuage
- Air France – Le Passage
- Altice – Feel the Connection
- AMD K6-2 – Flatzone
- AT&T Business – Gelato
- Bacardi – We Are the Night
- BMW – Pure Drive
- CHANEL – The CHANEL 25 Handbag
- Chobani – Fruit Symphony
- Coca-Cola – Snowboarder
- Nespresso – The Boutique
- Diet Coke – Tingle, Bounce
- Électricité de France – Selects
- Earthlink – Privacy
- FedEx – Dreams
- Fiat – Lancia Y10
- Fox Sports Network – Walking the Dog
- Fox Sports Network – Catching the Bus
- Fox Sports Network – Fish Tossing
- Fox Sports Network – Father Daughter
- GAP – That's Holiday
- Gatorade Propel Fitness Water – Drip
- Gillette – Training Tracks
- Guerlain – L'homme idéal
- Heineken – Debut
- HP – Michel Gondry
- HP – Get Real
- John Lewis – Moz the Monster
- Levi's – Bellybutton
- Levi's – Drugstore
- Levi's – Mermaids
- Levi's – Swap
- Motorola – Razr2
- NatWest – Zoom
- Nike – Basketball campaign (five ads)
- Nike – I Can Play
- Nike – Leo
- Nike – The Long, Long Run
- Pandora – Sounds Like You
- Polaroid – Resignation / Living Moments
- Smirnoff – Smarienberg
- Volvo – I Said Volvo

== Bibliography ==
- Henry Keazor, Thorsten Wuebbena, Video Thrills The Radio Star. Musikvideos: Geschichte, Themen, Analysen. Bielefeld 2005, pp. 90, 288; ISBN 978-3-89942-728-8
- You'll Like This Film Because You're In It (2008). PictureBox
- Markus Altmeyer, Die Filme und Musikvideos von Michel Gondry. Zwischen Surrealismus, Pop und Psychoanalyse, Marburg 2008; ISBN 978-3-8288-9764-9
- Henry Keazor, "`Emotional Landscapes´: Die Musikvideos von Michel Gondry und Björk", in: Klanglandschaften, ed. by Manuel Gervink and Jörn Pieter Hiekel, Hofheim 2009, pp. 45–63; ISBN 978-3-936000-59-7
- Henry Keazor/Thorsten Wuebbena, "Introduction" and Giulia Gabrielli, "An Analysis of the Relation between Music and Image. The Contribution of Michel Gondry", in: Keazor, Henry; Wuebbena, Thorsten: Rewind, Play, Fast Forward. The Past, Present and Future of the Music Video. Bielefeld 2010; ISBN 978-3-8376-1185-4, pp. 16–18, 89–109.
- Michael Fleig: Von Hand gedacht – Zum Werk von Michel Gondry. Würzburg: Königshausen & Neumann 2024. ISBN 978-3-8260-6645-0.
