= The Metamorphosis of Mr. Samsa =

1977 Canadian short animated fantasy film

- Directed by: Caroline Leaf
- Story by: Caroline Leaf
- Based on: The Metamorphosis by Franz Kafka
- Produced by: Caroline Leaf
- Music by: Normand Roger
- Animation by: Caroline Leaf
- Color process: black and white
- Production company: National Film Board of Canada
- Distributed by: National Film Board of Canada
- Release date: June 1977 (Annecy)
- Running time: 10 minutes
- Country: Canada
- Language: English

The Metamorphosis of Mr. Samsa is a 1977 Canadian short animated fantasy film by Caroline Leaf, adapted from Franz Kafka's The Metamorphosis, told through the animation of beach sand on a piece of glass. The film features music by Normand Roger and sound by Michel Descombes. The film earned ten awards from the year of its release in 1977 through to 1981 as it was screened at various film festivals around the world.

== Plot ==
A still from The Metamorphosis of Mr. Samsa

Mr. Samsa wakes up and discovers that he has turned into a giant beetle. The loving son and brother is unable to express his feelings of shame and guilt, nor his need for love. He is forced to become a recluse and is rejected by his family.

== Themes ==
Animator Kayla Parker remarks that metamorphosis, "literally, changing from one form into another", has been a trope of animation since 19th century "pre-cinema optical toys" characterized by "cycled graphic image sequences of squashed and stretched facial features and mutating bodies", and that Leaf regards the process of making a film as a kind of metamorphosis that may take years.

== Production ==
=== Inspiration and animation technique ===
Caroline Leaf has made several films using sand animation, a technique she invented, and which gives what John Coulthart calls "painterly, if monochromatic, results," with "probably less time-consuming than other techniques that aim for similar effects." For a solo animator, the technique is a "complex, technically difficult process requiring focused skill and sustained commitment", Kayla Parker comparing the animator's feat to the impossible task often performed in myths and folk tales. The choice of animating The Metamorphosis was suggested to Leaf by "a friend and mentor," according to an email interview: it "was a good fit", as her own "black and white sand images had the potential to have a Kafka-esque feel – dark and mysterious". The images were created by manipulating ordinary play sand on an opaque glass surface lit from underneath and photographed from above. The technique has its limitations (she could not create highly detailed images), but according to Leaf, "the limitations of drawing in sand, the simplifications that it requires, made me inventive in the storytelling".

=== Financing ===
Leaf stated in an interview with Midhat Ajanović that she started working on the film before her move to Canada, with a grant from the American Film Institute. Ian Bernie reports that it became a three-year project, and "something of a struggle to complete", as Leaf was unable to interest the National Film Board in the project; working on it at home, frequently fearing that she "would lose track of the flow". After completing The Owl Who Married a Goose, she got a contract with the National Film Board to do The Street. Since she was working at the Film Board by the time Mr. Samsa was finished, and she had just received an Oscar nomination for The Street, the Film Board agreed to help with the sound and post production. "It became an NFB production." Leaf worked on both films simultaneously. "I had a 16mm camera of my own at home which I set up. At night I worked on Mr. Samsa, and The Street was my daytime job."

=== Story adaptation ===
Leaf reflected on the process of adapting The Metamorphosis in an interview with John Canemaker in 1988:

The Kafka story is so complicated and wonderful. There I took just the element of what I was thinking about most—how horrible it would be to have a body, or the external part of one's self that's seen by the world be different from what's inside one's self, and not be able to communicate that. Since I'm a storyteller, I just worked with that one aspect of Kafka, so it's quite different from his original story.

In an interview with Nag Vladermersky in 2003, Leaf described Kafka's storytelling as "intensely interior and psychological"; at the time, she says she did not know a "film language" to adapt it and she "stuck to a barebones narrative and a strong sense of atmosphere." A shoestring budget prevented her from acquiring the rights to the English translation, though the story itself is in the public domain, thus there is almost no dialogue, and what there is was "made up" by Leaf, "a kind of gobbledy-gook language". For the same reason, it could not be a long film, so characters were cut and the events which transpire over weeks in the original work take place in a single day in the film. Her stated concern with "losing the flow" reflects her working approach, as she "starts with a strong image and builds out in both directions", rarely using a storyboard, rather working from a "rough plan that changes a lot" which enabled her to "work the sand in a more painterly way".

== Release ==
The Metamorphosis of Mr. Samsa had its world premiere at the Annecy International Animated Film Festival in June 1977, and was later released in Canadian theatres by the National Film Board of Canada.

=== Home media ===
The short was released on a 44-minute anthology DVD in 1998, along with Leaf's Two Sisters and works by three other Canadian animators, under the title Tales from the Dark Side. A 72-minute box set anthology DVD was released in 2010, titled Caroline Leaf: Out on a Limb - Hand-Crafted Cinema, containing the short and several other works by Leaf.

=== Streaming ===
The short is available for streaming by subscription from the National Film Board of Canada (CAMPUS).

== Reception ==
=== Critical response ===
==== Contemporary ====
Ian Bernie, writing after the film's premiere, noted that Leaf abandoned Kafka's first-person narrator for a less subjective point of view, and "though one may keenly regret losing this bug eye on the world in the one art form that could conceivably visualize it, the exhilarating, uncanny shifts of perspective that result are ample compensation."

This daring stylistic manoeuvre, comparable to a disembodied eye exploring a collapsing set, is Leaf's richest gift to animation: in one three-second sequence, the gaze is swept from the insect, slid under the door, lifted across the living room, to finally twist back of the mother's head, and end in a close-up of her knotted bun - this web of thick black lines. If the film suffers at all it is from being almost too abstract, too chiaroscuro, unlightened with dialogue as was The Street, or broken into the clearly divided planes - the snow and the sea - of The Owl and the Goose. But style expresses subject and at the end, when the possibility of logic is swallowed up by the blackness, there is only the sense of a powerful, disturbing vision.

Paul Wells, citing Hungarian animator John Halas (1987) (Note: Masters of Animation London: BBC Books.) reports that, along with Leaf's other films made in the 1970s, Mr. Samsa "consolidated her place as one of the acknowledged "masters" of animation."

Luc Perrault said Leaf's adaptation of Kafka's story was simply the best in any medium. Contrastingly, Caryn James, reviewing a retrospective exhibition spanning twenty-three years of Leaf's work for The New York Times, felt the short did not do justice to Kafka's story: "Leaf seems to be illustrating the story, not reimagining the terror of a man turned into a beetle ... Too often she settles for such eloquent but facile illustrations."

==== Retrospective ====
Several twenty-first century critics of The Metamorphosis of Mr. Samsa pay particular attention to the "extraordinary fluidity" of Leaf's representation of point of view and of space itself. Brian Ashbee opines that the film demonstrates "how well animation can model the stuff of which ... psychological space is composed. Her viewpoint is as mobile and responsive to every nuance as is the constantly evolving present in a 'stream of consciousness' novel." Aylish Wood notes how the technique relates to the film's themes:

The fluidity of form also evokes the complexity of the spatial organization of Gregor's home. When Gregor wakes up, his room is his bedroom but as the animation continues its door becomes a barrier that separates him from the other members of the family. As the technique of the animation metamorphoses so easily between Gregor and his parents on the other side of the door, a paradox emerges. The frequently effortless shifts between the spaces exist in tension with Gregor's entrapment, making his imprisonment appear all the more profound.

In an article on distortion of spatial orientation in animation, which Ryan Pierson calls "whole-screen metamorphosis," Pierson remarks that the film "dissolves the sense of ground that is needed to support an impression of world, in a kind of becoming-animal of the camera." Giannalberto Bendazzi calls the animation "masterful", appreciating how the film is constantly changing perspective, "sometimes focusing on the protagonist's subjective understanding of his new condition." Colin Marshall says the "ever-shifting visual texture lends itself well to the theme of the tale". He reports that animator Johnny Chew calls it "an awesome short film on its own, and a great adaptation of the Kafka work, but when you consider the style in which it was made and the control that would have to go into each frame, it's unbelievable." David Brody called The Metamorphosis of Mr. Samsa a "motion painting" on glass, and "devastatingly melancholic."

Jean-François Hamel, agreeing with Caryn James above, called Leaf's treatment reductive and the tone of the film sentimental: since she adapts only the first part of the story, she avoids the disturbing and powerful force of the original work.

=== Accolades ===
By 1981, The Metamorphosis of Mr. Samsa had received ten awards.

1977

- Annecy International Animated Film Festival • International Critics' Award

1978

- Golden Gate (San Francisco) • Certificate for Outstanding Achievement
- Ottawa International Animation Festival • Special Jury Award
- Cork Film Festival • Certificate of Merit - Category: Animated Films
- Krakow Film Festival • Grand Prize ("Golden Dragon") • Diploma of Distinction (artistic qualities)
- International Film Festival (Athens, Georgia) • Merit Award

1980

- Columbus International Film & Video Festival -Category: Art and Culture • Honorable Mention
- Hong Kong International Film Festival • Certificate for an Outstanding Film
- Association of Independent Video and Filmmakers - Short Film Showcase • Honorarium ($3000)

1981

- HEMISFILM, San Antonio • Best Animated Film ex-aequo with A Christmas Gift by Will Vinton

In 2010, as part of their 50th anniversary celebrations, the Krakow Film Festival listed the short in their Top Ten best films presented at the festival.
