= The Owl Who Married a Goose: An Eskimo Legend =

- Directed by: Caroline Leaf
- Produced by: Pierre Moretti
- Edited by: Pierre Lemelin
- Distributed by: National Film Board of Canada
- Release date: 1974
- Running time: 7:40 minutes
- Country: Canada
- Language: Inuktitut

The Owl Who Married a Goose: An Eskimo Legend is a 1974 animated short from Caroline Leaf, produced by the National Film Board of Canada and the Canadian Department of Indian and Northern Affairs.

== Synopsis ==
In this short animation based on an Inuit legend, a goose captures the fancy of an owl, a weakness for which he will pay dearly. Despite being from different species, an owl and goose marry. When the goose obeys nature and joins the other geese migrating south, the owl follows but can't keep up, and when the geese stop over on a lake, the owl is unable to float on the water and sinks to the bottom. The sound effects and voices are Inuktitut, but the animation leaves no doubt as to the unfolding action, and the moral of the story—to the Inuit, the foolish owl has broken an important rule of the North: don't try to be something other than what you are.

Leaf worked with Inuit artists in the interpretation and design of this film: sounds were provided by Jeela Alilkatuktuk, Paul Angiyou, Martha Kauki, and Samonee, older people who remembered mimicking animal sounds to help with the hunting. Drawings were done by Inuk artist Agnes Nanogak. For the animation, Leaf used sand animation, drawing on sand on a glass slide lit from below.

== Reception ==
Millimeter wrote, “The film is one of exquisite delicacy and bitter sweet humor, a triumph of sincere animation in a technique far removed from traditional cel methods.”

Monthly Film Bulletinwrote, “Caroline Leaf displays in this abstract love story the rich and tonal skills which she later used to effect in The Street."

In July 2011, the film was included in Watch Me Move, an exhibit world animation at the Barbican Centre, London. Over the next five years, that exhibition toured to Calgary, Taipei, Rio de Janeiro, Detroit, Monterrey, Madrid and Moscow.

== Awards and nominations ==
- 26th Canadian Film Awards: Best Animated Short, 1975
- 26th Canadian Film Awards: Best Sound Re-Recording, 1975
- Annecy International Animation Film Festival: Elie Renaud Prix Special, 1975
- 29th British Academy Film Awards: Nominee: BAFTA Award for Best Short Animation, 1975
- Ottawa International Animation Festival: First Prize, Films for Children, 1976
- Information Film Producers’ Association Convention, Hollywood: Silver Award, 1976
- Information Film Producers’ Association Convention, Hollywood: Silver Award, 1976
- Melbourne Film Festival, Melbourne: Third Prize, Silver Boomerang, 1976
- Melbourne Film Festival, Melbourne: Prize of the Government of Victoria, 1976
- Linz International Short Film Festival, Linz:
- American Film and Video Festival, New York: Red Ribbon, Language Arts, First Prize, 1977
