= 26th Canadian Film Awards =

Canadian film awards ceremony

- Date: October 12, 1975
- Location: Shaw Festival, Niagara-on-the-Lake, Ontario
- Hosted by: Peter Gzowski

Highlights
- Most awards: Les ordres (Orders); Eliza's Horoscope
- Best Motion Picture 1974: The Apprenticeship of Duddy Kravitz
- Best Motion Picture 1975: Les ordres (Orders)

The 26th Canadian Film Awards were held on October 12, 1975 to honour achievements in Canadian film. The ceremony was hosted by radio personality Peter Gzowski.

The CFAs were expanded into a week-long event in Niagara-on-the-Lake which included all-day screenings, a National Film Board of Canada retrospective, and daily 'Meet the Filmmakers' programs.

Due to the Quebec boycott crisis which protested the treatment of films from Quebec at the 25th Canadian Film Awards in 1973, and the resulting cancellation of the awards in 1974, the 1975 awards covered films released in both 1974 and 1975. Accordingly, the Canadian Film Awards committee revived the Film of the Year category, which had not been used since 1970, so that it could name separate Best Picture winners for both 1974 and 1975. In all other categories, however, separate winners were not named for the two years. There were 300 films in competition but French-Canadian filmmakers did not participate.

== Films ==
- Film of the Year (1974): The Apprenticeship of Duddy Kravitz — International Cinemedia Centre, John Kemeny, Ted Kotcheff director
- Film of the Year (1975): Les ordres (Orders) — Productions Prisma, Bernard Lalonde, Claude Godbout and Guy Dufaux producers
- Feature Film: Les ordres (Orders) — Productions Prisma, Bernard Lalonde, Claude Godbout and Guy Dufaux producers, Michel Brault director
- Theatrical Documentary: Janis — Crawley Films, F. R. Crawley producer, Howard Alk and Seaton Findlay directors
- Documentary Under 30 Minutes: At 99: A Portrait of Louise Tandy Murch — Sunrise Films, Paul Saltzman and Deepa Mehta producers, Deepa Mehta director
- Documentary Over 30 Minutes: Cree Hunters of Mistassini — National Film Board of Canada, Colin Low producer, Tony Ianzelo and Boyce Richardson directors
- Theatrical Short: Along These Lines — Immedia Inc., Isabel Ripley and Patrick Watson producers, Peter Pearson director
- Animated Short: The Owl Who Married a Goose: An Eskimo Legend — National Film Board of Canada, Pierre Moretti producer, Caroline Leaf director
- TV Drama: A Bird in the House — Canadian Broadcasting Corporation, Ron Weyman producer
- Arts and Experimental: Not awarded

== Feature Film Craft Awards ==
- Performance by a Lead Actor: Stuart Gillard - Why Rock the Boat? (NFB)
- Performance by a Lead Actress: Margot Kidder - A Quiet Day in Belfast (Twinbay Media) and Black Christmas (Telefilm Canada)
- Supporting Actor: Henry Beckman - Why Rock the Boat? (NFB)
- Supporting Actress: Lila Kedrova - Eliza's Horoscope (O-Zali Productions)
- Art Direction: François Barbeau - Eliza's Horoscope
- Cinematography: Paul Van der Linden - Eliza's Horoscope
- Director: Michel Brault - Les ordres (Orders)
- Film Editing: Stan Cole - Black Christmas (Telefilm Canada)
- Sound Editing: Kenneth Heeley-Ray - Black Christmas (Telefilm Canada)
- Music Score: Nick Whitehead - Lions for Breakfast (Burg Productions)
- Original Screenplay: Michel Brault - Les ordres (Orders)
- Adapted Screenplay: William Weintraub - Why Rock the Boat? (NFB)
- Overall Sound: Patrick Rousseau (recording) and Stephen Dalby (re-recording) - The Apprenticeship of Duddy Kravitz and

Stephen Dalby - Eliza's Horoscope

== Non-Feature Craft Awards ==
- Performance by a Lead Actor: William Hutt - The National Dream: Building the Impossible Railway (CBC)
- Performance by a Lead Actress: Jayne Eastwood - The Collaborators: Deedee (CBC)
- Supporting Actor or Actress: Patricia Hamilton - A Bird in the House
- Art Direction: Not awarded
- Cinematography: Kenneth W. Gregg - Next Year in Jerusalem and The Collaborators: Deedee (CBC) and A Bird in the House
- Direction: Robin Spry - Action: The October Crisis of 1970 (NFB)
- Film Editing: Arla Saare - Next Year in Jerusalem
- Sound Editing: Barry Greenwald - Metamorphosis (Conestoga College, Barry Greenwald Inc.)
- Musical Score: Marius Benoit - Le légende du vent
- Screenplay: Patricia Watson - A Bird in the House
- Non-Dramatic Script: Donald Brittain - Dreamland: A History of Early Canadian Movies 1895-1939 (NFB)
- Sound Recording: Dan Gibson - Wings in the Wilderness (Keg Productions)
- Sound Re-Recording: Jean-Pierre Joutel - Goldwood (NFB) and Whistling Smith (NFB) and The Owl Who Married a Goose: An Eskimo Legend (NFB)

== Special awards ==
- For Contribution to Animation: John Straiton - Horseplay
- For Contribution to Short Fiction: Michael Asti-Rose - Silent Movie
- For Contribution to Feature Film: Gordon Sheppard - Eliza's Horoscope
- Grierson Award: Pierre Juneau "for outstanding contributions to Canadian cinema".
