= Bradbrook =

Bradbrook is a surname. Notable people with the surname include:

- Gail Bradbrook (born 1972), British environmental activist
- M. C. Bradbrook (1909–1993), British literary scholar
- Robert Bradbrook (born 1965), British filmmaker and animator
- Kate Bradbrook (born 1981), British journalist for the BBC
