= Curtas Vila do Conde =

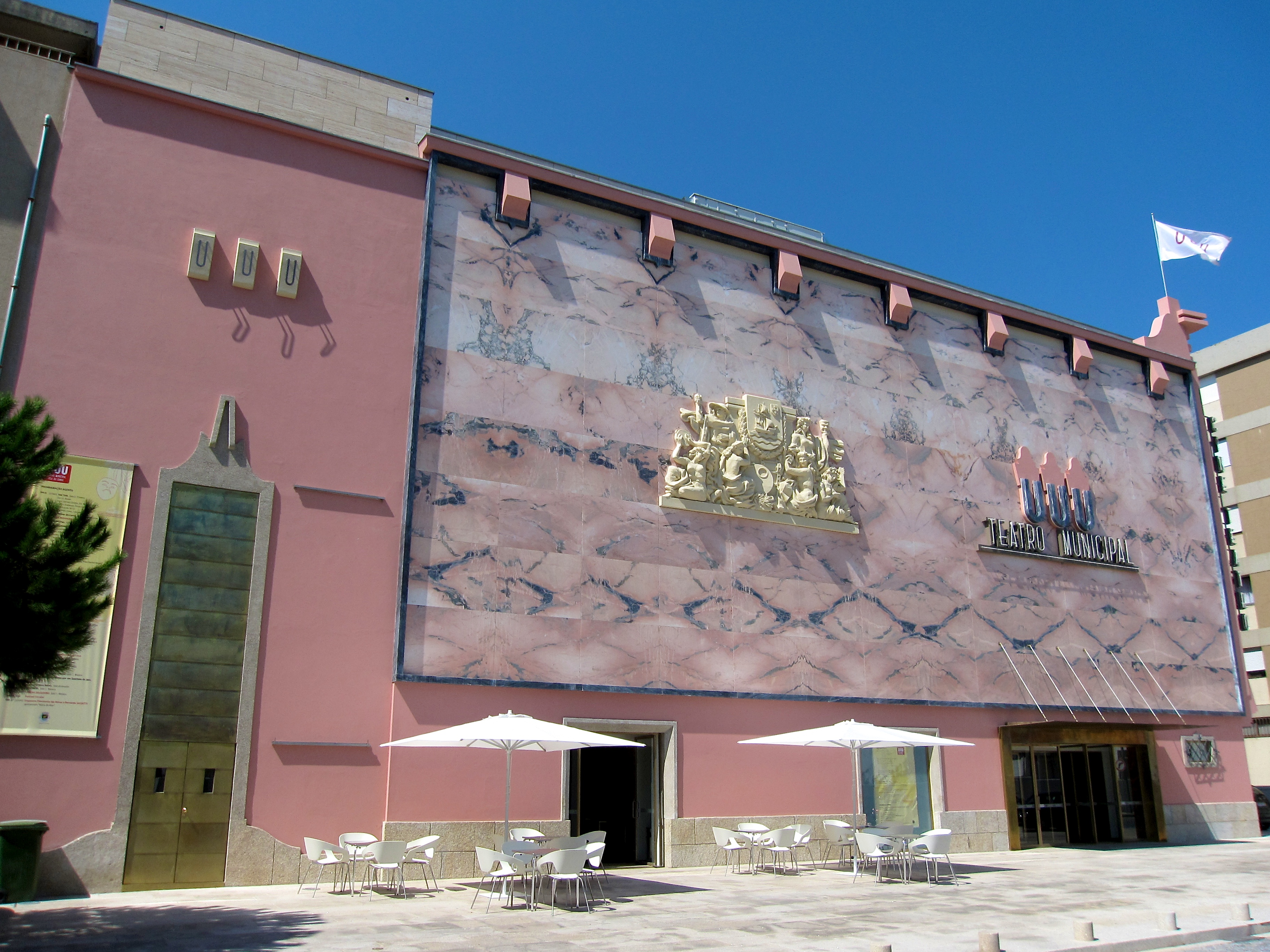

Curtas Vila do Conde International Film Festival, created in 1993, is one of the most important cinematographic and cultural events in Portugal dedicated to short-films and annually produced in July, in the city Vila do Conde. The edition of 2011 had more than 20 000 spectators. In 2012 the festival celebrates the 20th Edition.

== Awards ==
- Main awards from 2011
  - Great Prize Cidade Vila do Conde - BORO IN THE BOX, Bertrand Mandico, France
  - Best Fiction - PETIT TAILLEUR, Louis Garrel, France
  - Best Documentary - GET OUT OF THE CAR, Thom Andersen, United States
  - Best Animation - WAKARANAI BUTA, Atsushi Wada, Japan
  - Best Experimental - THE PUSHCARTS LEAVE ETERNITY STREET, Ken Jacobs, United States
  - Best Music Video - RELEASE THE FREQ – MATTA, Kim Holm, Norway
  - Best Portuguese Short film - O NOSSO HOMEM, Pedro Costa, Portugal
  - Take One! Prize - ARTUR, Flávio Pires, Portugal
  - Curtinhas Prize - ORMIE, Rob Silvestri, Canada

Awards from earlier editions
