= Sudeten German Museum =

Museum in Munich

The Sudeten German Museum is the central museum for Sudeten Germans, the German-speaking inhabitants of Czechoslovakia. It opened in October 2020 on Hochstraße in Munich's Au district. It is located right next to the Sudetendeutschen Haus. In 2022 it was nominated for the European Museum of the Year Award.

== Description ==
The museum's permanent exhibition describes more than 1100 years of history, art and cultural history. For centuries, the Sudeten Germans had their homeland in the Czech lands, where it was shaped by the three peoples who lived there together – the Germans, the Czechs and the Jews. The Sudeten German Museum explores different aspects of the fate of this shared homeland. All texts and media are trilingual.

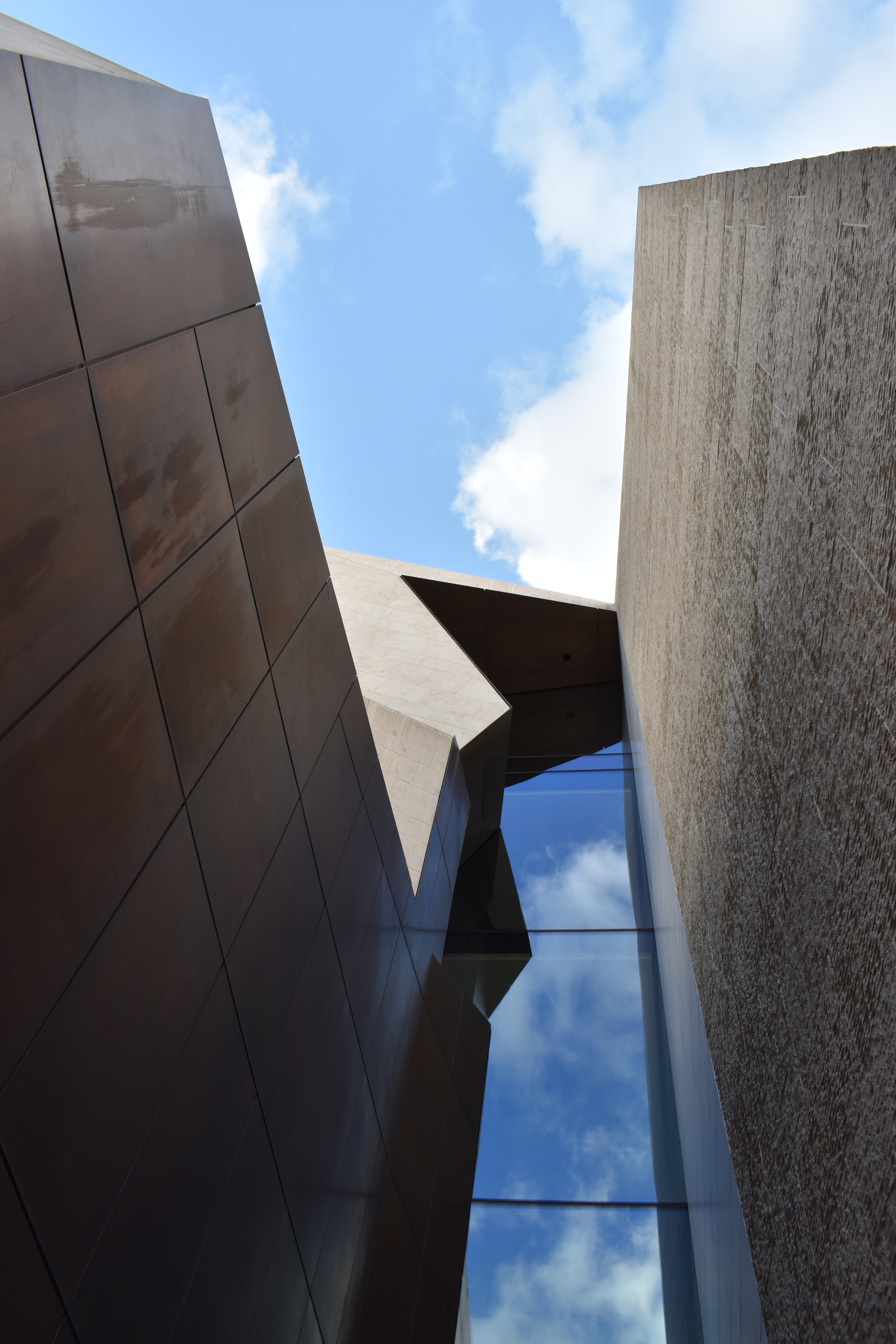
The building of the Sudeten German Museum as seen from the backside.

== Museum building ==
The 1200-square-metre five-storey building was designed by the pmp Architekten architectural office and is accessible. It is located on the former site of the “Wallenstein Stuben” restaurant.

The museum building directly adjoins the southern wing of the Sudeten German House. With its light-coloured sandstone façade, the sculpted structure makes a bold statement from a site high on the banks of the River Isar near Gasteig cultural centre. From Hochstraße, the building appears hermetically sealed off while, at the back, it is defined by a long jagged window. The interior is dominated by polygonal surfaces and by material and surface contrasts: metal surfaces in brass and bronze tones, sandstone, smoked dark oak flooring, and cobblestones in the foyer and bistro.

The exhibition areas are unostentatious, windowless and irregular in layout. The entire space is spread over five levels, through which the visitor descends from top to bottom following the sequence of exhibition themes. The interior design of the permanent exhibition was created by the office of Dr. Ulrich Hermanns in Münster.

== Exhibitions ==
The museum’s collection is based on the collections of the Sudetendeutsche Stiftung (Sudeten German Foundation) and the former Sudetendeutsche Archiv (Sudeten German Archive), now known as the Sudetendeutsches Institut (Sudeten German Institute). Systematic collection began in 1998 with the assistance of the foundation, along with the creation of a scientific inventory. The collection contains around 42,000 objects on the topics of day-to-day culture, trade and industry, politics and contemporary history, arts and crafts, painting and graphic reproduction. There is also an extensive archive of records and images, which is managed by the Bayerische Hauptstaatsarchiv (central Bavarian state archive).

In its permanent collection, the Sudeten German Museum uses about 900 objects and more than 30 media stations and databases to tell the history of Germans in Bohemia, Moravia and Sudeten Silesia under the theme of “homeland”. Visitors gain an impression of the cultural, religious and scientific environment in this Central European region before 1945. One section of the exhibition, entitled “The End of the Accepted Order”, traces the political and social developments that led to the catastrophe of war, escape and expulsion. The exhibition ends with a description of the arduous new beginnings and integration of the displaced Sudeten Germans.

In addition to its permanent exhibition, the museum puts on temporary exhibitions at the Alfred Kubin Gallery in the Sudeten German House next door. The first temporary exhibition, in 2021, was “Werner Reinisch – From Bohemia to the Ardèche”. The second temporary exhibition was entitled “Everything else can be replaced...Christmas cribs from Bohemia and Moravia” and ran from 2021 to 2022. In 2022, the Sudeten German Museum put on a temporary exhibition entitled ““All manner of artworks. Relief inlays from Eger“. In 2023, the museum will dedicate a temporary exhibition to Otfried Preußler, the Bohemian children’s author, on the occasion of his centenary.

The old building also provides a space for the museum’s educational workshops and other events. In all its events, the museum emphasises the importance of international dialogue, especially with the Czech Republic, and the importance of European values such as human rights. Every year, the museum conducts a conference of peoples under the title "Sudeten German Dialogues", but it also teaches history using less conventional methods, among them laser shows, dance performances and sand animation. Special guided tours, lectures and film screenings round off the programme of the Sudeten German Museum.

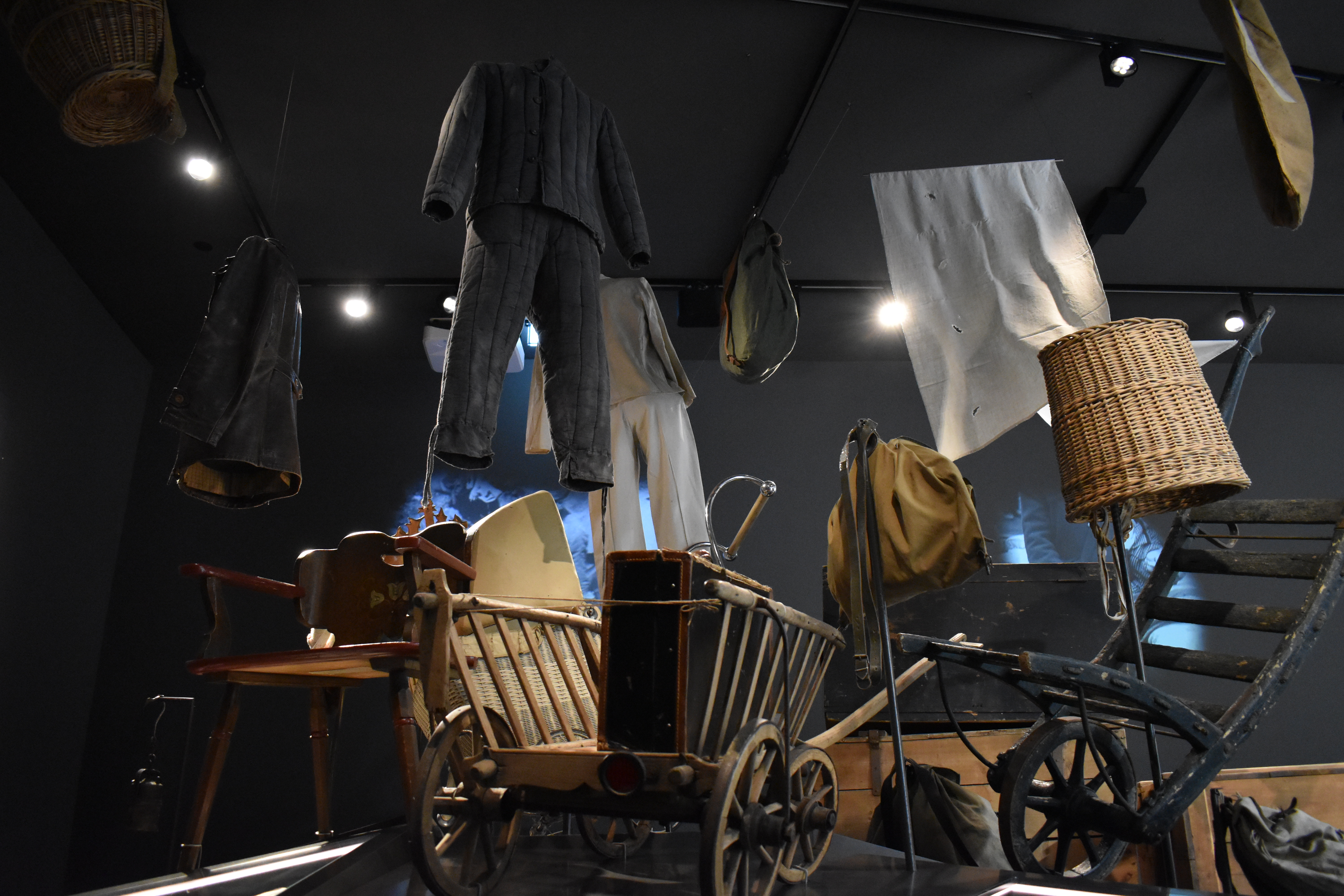
Objects of the expulsion "whirl" through the air in level 4. The installation illustrates how the familiar world of the Sudeten Germans is shattered.

== Publications ==
The Sudeten German Museum has also issued a number of publications. Most of them are available in German only, but the Sudeten German Museum – SDM, Sudeten German Museum, edited by Stefan Planker, was published in 2022 in German, Czech and English.
