= Alexandra Konofalskaya =

Belarusian sand animation artist

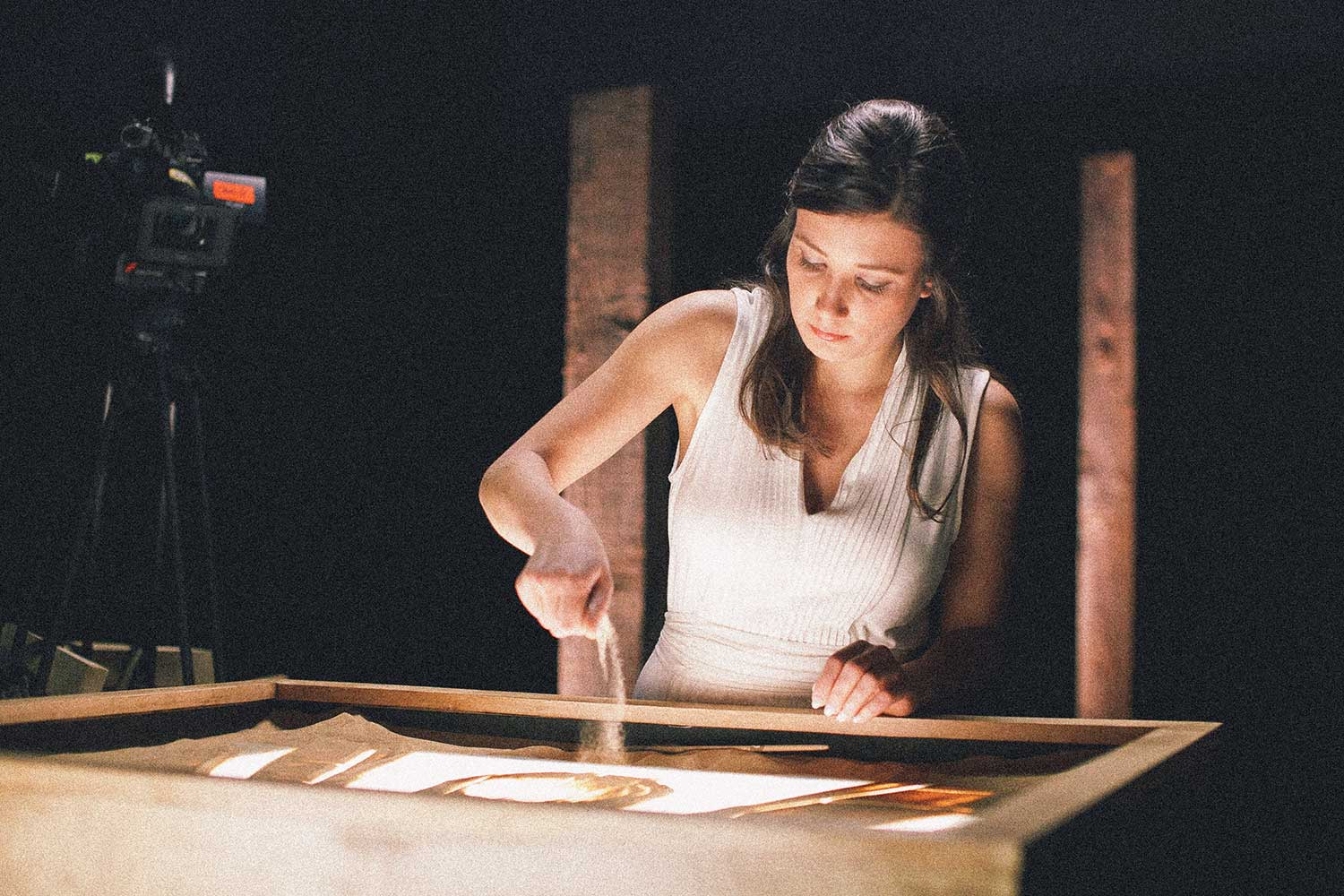
- Born: June 11, 1986 (age 40); Zhodino

Alexandra Konofalskaya (born June 11, 1986) is a sand animation artist.

Born in Zhodino, Minsk Region, Belarus, Konofalskaya had always dreamt of stage, and, as a child, she attended dancing classes. Though love to drawing led Konofalskaya to Zhodino kids art school in 1996 (graduated in 2000, summa cum laude). Continuing to improve in arts, in 2004 Konofalskaya entered the Maxim Tank Belarusian State Pedagogical University, the faculty of folk culture. She graduated in 2009 as a specialist in arts and drafting, artistic handicrafts. Being a student, Konofalskaya took part in a number of exhibitions and creative projects. Besides, she also arranged several personal exhibitions and performances. In 2008 and 2009 Konofalskaya participated in an international action, Night of Museums, as the art director in the Belarusian National Arts Museum.

In 2009 she makes a dream of her childhood, both drawing and stage performances combined, to come true. Alexandra establishes a project “Sandart. To see unique”. A New Year sand art program, which has occurred on the stage of the Republic Palace same year, becomes Alexandra's debut as a sand artist. Currently, Alexandra Konofalskaya is a leading sand artist in Belarus. She arranges concert activities in her country and throughout the world. Alexandra Konofalskaya is an author of a number of sand programs, shows, performances and videos. As an actor and a sand artist, Alexandra Konofalskaya is a constant guest on events in a number of centers and establishments for orphans and disabled people. She manages charitable performances, and actively helps homeless animals. An owner of 12 outbred dogs.

Some events with Alexandra Konofalskaya and the project "Sandart. To see unique" participation:

- AUDI R8 commercial (Beijing)
- NOVA FRANCE company presentation (Lodz)
- International exhibition MOSBUILD (Moscow)
- Concert of Ennio Morricone and Roman Symphonic orchestra (Warsaw)
- DAVIDOFF company's new style presentation (Wroclaw)
- “Aazaan” movie shooting, Bollywood (Tangier)
- PORSCHE CAYENNE and VOLVO S60 presentation (Minsk)
- Dukascopy Bank reward ceremony (Geneva)
- VOEST ALPINE plant opening (Bucharest)
- International Economic Forum (Krakow)
- Hockey tournament in honor of Ruslan Salei (Minsk)
- Movie shooting for BRITISH COLUMBIA WOOD (Vancouver)
- MED EL Austrian company conference (Istanbul)
- STADLER plant opening (Minsk)
- FORSTEO preparation presentation (Prague)
- U.N.O. conference (Warsaw)
- Charitable events for fund-raising for new Belarusian hospice construction (Minsk)
