= Caroline Leaf =

Canadian-American filmmaker and animator

- Born: August 12, 1946 (age 80); Seattle, Washington, United States
- Education: Radcliffe College
- Occupations: Film director; Animator; Screenwriter; Painter
- Years active: 1969–present
- Website: http://www.carolineleaf.com

Caroline Leaf (born August 12, 1946) is a Canadian American filmmaker, animator, director, tutor and artist. She has produced numerous short animated films and her work has been recognized worldwide. She is best known as one of the pioneering filmmakers at the National Film Board of Canada (NFB). She worked at the NFB from 1972 to 1991. During that time, she created the sand animation and paint-on-glass animation techniques. She also tried new hands-on techniques with 70 mm IMAX film. Her work is often representational of Canadian culture and is narrative-based. Leaf now lives in London, England, and is a tutor at The National Film and Television School. She maintains a studio in London working in oils and on paper and does landscape drawing with an iPad.

== Biography and early work ==
Leaf was born in Seattle, Washington and lived in Boston. She attended Radcliffe College, Harvard University, and majored in architectural sciences and visual arts from 1964 to 1968. During her last year of studies, she enrolled in an animation class. The class was taught by Derek Lamb as a creative practice, not as a professional training. Lamb encouraged his students to focus on movement. Leaf worked with beach sand spread on a lightbox. This is when she created sand animation. Using this technique, she produced her first film Sand, or Peter and the Wolf and was awarded a scholarship from Harvard University. After graduation, she moved to Italy for a year to focus on her drawing. Returning to Harvard, she made her second animated film, Orfeo painting on glass. She then did freelance work from a studio in Boston and made How Beaver Stole Fire. Leaf moved to Montreal to work as an animator / director for the National Film Board of Canada in 1972. She worked at the NFB in the French and English animation departments until 1991. She made nine animated and live puppet films and a documentary film during those years.

== Career ==
Leaf made her first film, Sand, or Peter and the Wolf, in 1969 at Harvard University. The short was made by pouring sand on a light box and manipulating the shapes frame-by-frame. Her second film at Harvard, Orfeo, was painted on glass under the camera. In 1972, she was invited to join the National Film Board of Canada's French Animation Studio. Her first film for the NFB was The Owl Who Married a Goose: An Eskimo Legend.

Making the film involved two trips to the Canadian Arctic, first to collaborate on designs with the Inuvialuk artist Agnes Nanogak and afterwards to record the sound effects for the film. Her most renowned short film was The Street, which was drawn directly under the camera with a mix of paint and glycerin. It was adapted from the short story by Mordecai Richler, and was nominated for the Academy Award for Best Animated Short Film at the 49th Academy Awards. It is also featured in the Animation Show of Shows.

Leaf co-directed an animated documentary film called Interview with Veronika Soul. She made a documentary film on the singers Kate & Anna McGarrigle, produced by Derek Lamb. In 1990, she made her first animation in nearly a decade by scratching into the emulsion of exposed black 70 mm colour film and reshooting it on 35 mm film. She worked for two years using this technique on her film Two Sisters original version called Entre Deux Soeurs. The tone and story of this film is dark. Two Sisters won the award for best short film at the Annecy International Animation Film Festival in 1991.

Leaf worked as an animator/director at the NFB until 1991. In 1991, she left animation to establish herself as a fine arts artist working in oils. In 2004, she contributed animation to a film about the Underground Railroad produced by Acme Filmworks in Los Angeles called Suite for Freedom. Her part was called Slavery.

== Animation techniques and influence ==
Leaf discovered a spontaneous and artistic hand crafted way of animating in her animation class at Harvard and developed it in her professional career, pioneering: sand and paint-on-glass animation, along with hand etching on film stock. All of her techniques have been described as having "fluid transitions". She used different techniques to best tell the story of each of her films which showcased her narrative-based style. She created simple anecdotal and fictional stories based on literary works. Her films contain characters with relatable and complex issues. Her stories are mostly adaptations from literature and reflect her often dark narrative content. Every decision when I am animating is for the benefit of the story."

Leaf is also considered an influential Canadian filmmaker for her long standing service with the National Film Board of Canada and her representation of Canadian culture in her films. This can mainly be seen in her films The Street, The Owl who Married a Goose, and Kate and Anna McGarrigle.

== Painting and drawing ==
Since 2000, Leaf has maintained a studio in London, England, and developed a personal style of painting in oils as well as drawings on paper. Her work is abstract and very much guided by mark-making and a personal search to create spaces a viewer is invited to enter. She has also developed a lively landscape style of direct observation from nature and works on field trips with paper and pencil and also iPad, using programs called Brushes and ProCreate.

== Exhibitions ==
- onlinegallery.site 'Two Artists One Drawing' 2022
- onlinegallery.site 'Spaces' 2021
- Playing with Perception, The Gallery, St Martin-in-the-Fields, Trafalgar Square, London, 2015
- The Leper Chapel, Cambridge, England, 2008
- The Shop Gallery, Vallance Road, London, 2006
- The Corridor Gallery, London, 2004
- Krakow Animation Festival, Kraków, Poland, 1998
- Animafest Zagreb (Zagreb International Animation Festival), Zagreb, Croatia, 1996

== Residencies ==
- Michael Nock Foundation, Hong Kong, 2014
- Abbaye de Fontevraud, France, 2014
- Banff Centre for Arts and Creativity, Canada, summer 1997

== Selected filmography ==
Year	Title	Credit Listing
1969	Sand, or Peter and the Wolf	animator, director
1972	Orfeo	animator, director
1972	How Beaver Stole Fire	animator, director
1976	The Owl Who Married a Goose: An Eskimo Legend	animator, director
1976	The Street	animator, director
1977	The Metamorphosis of Mr. Samsa	animator, director
1979	Interview	co-animator, director
1981	Kate and Anna McGarrigle	director
1981	The Right to Refuse	co-screenwriter, co-producer, director
1982	An Equal Opportunity	director, co-screenwriter
1983	Pies	animator
1983	War Series	animator, director
1985	The Owl and the Pussycat	director, producer, designer
1986	The Fox and The Tiger: A Chinese Parable	director, designer
1986	A Dog's Tale: A Mexican Parable	director
1988	Paradise Found	animator, director
1990	Two Sisters	animator, director
1991	I Met a Man	animator, director
1993	Bell Partout	animator, director
1994	Fleay's Fauna Centre	animator, director
1995	Brain Battle	animator, director
1995	Radio Rock Detente	animator, director
2004	Slavery	director

== Awards ==
Year	Award	Competition	Title
1975	Émile Reynaud Special Award	Annecy International Animation Film Festival, France	The Owl Who Married a Goose: An Eskimo Legend
1975	Etrog for Best Animated Film	26th Canadian Film Awards	The Owl Who Married a Goose: An Eskimo Legend
1976	Victorian Government Prize	Melbourne Film Festival, Australia	The Owl Who Married a Goose: An Eskimo Legend
1976	Third Prize - Silver Boomerang	Melbourne Film Festival, Australia	The Owl Who Married a Goose: An Eskimo Legend
1976	First Prize	Melbourne Film Festival, Australia	The Owl Who Married a Goose: An Eskimo Legend
1976	First Prize - Films for Children	Ottawa International Animation Festival, Canada	The Owl Who Married a Goose: An Eskimo Legend
1976	Silver Cindy Award	Cindy Competition, United States	The Owl Who Married a Goose: An Eskimo Legend
1976	Special Award for Animation	Cindy Competition, United States	The Owl Who Married a Goose: An Eskimo Legend
1976	Silver Award	Information Film Producers Association Convention, United States	The Owl Who Married a Goose: An Eskimo Legend
1976	Grand Prix	Ottawa International Animation Festival, Canada	The Street
1976	Wendy Michener Award	27th Canadian Film Awards	The Street
1976	Etrog for Best Animated Film	27th Canadian Film Awards	The Street
1977	Blue Ribbon Award - Language Arts	American Film and Video Festival	The Street
1977	Special Prize	Melbourne International Film Festival, Australia	The Street
1977	First Prize - Animated Films	Cork International Film Festival, Ireland	The Street
1977	Chris Bronze Plaque	Columbus International Film & Animation Festival, United States	The Street
1977	First Prize	High Plains Film Festival - Texas Tech University, United States	The Street
1977	Special Jury Mention	Lille International Short Film Festival, France	The Street
1977	Red Ribbon Award - Language arts	American Film and Video Festival	The Owl Who Married a Goose: An Eskimo Legend
1977	First Prize	Melbourne Film Festival, Australia	The Owl Who Married a Goose: An Eskimo Legend
1977	Special Jury Mention	International Arctic Film Festival, Finland	The Owl Who Married a Goose: An Eskimo Legend
1977	Critic's Award	Annecy International Animation Film Festival, France	The Metamorphosis of Mr. Samsa
1978	Award for Best Animation	Huesca International Film Festival, Spain	The Street
1978	Merit Award	Annual International Film Festival, United States	The Metamorphosis of Mr. Samsa
1978	Grand Prize	Kraków Film Festival, Poland	The Metamorphosis of Mr. Samsa
1978	Special Jury Award	Ottawa International Animation Festival	The Metamorphosis of Mr. Samsa
1978	Certificate for Outstanding Achievement	Golden Gate Awards Competition & International Film Festival, United States	The Metamorphosis of Mr. Samsa
1979	AMER Golden Eye Award	Annual AMER Film Awards, United States	The Street
1979	Jury Award for Best Short Film	Montreal World Film Festival	Interview
1979	First Prize (5-15 mins)	World Festival of Animated Film	Interview
1980	Certificate for an Outstanding Film	Hong Kong International Film Festival	The Metamorphosis of Mr. Samsa
1981	Grand Prix	Melbourne Film Festival, Australia	Interview
1991	Best Film Award	Annecy International Animation Film Festival, France	Two Sisters
1991	Grand Prix	International Animation Celebration, United States	Two Sisters
1991	Best Animation Award	International Short Film Festival, Sweden	Two Sisters
1992	Honorable Mention	American Film and Video Festival	Two Sisters
1992	Special Jury Award	International Animation Film Festival, China	Two Sisters
1992	Alberta-Quebec Award	Quebec-Alberta Prizes, Canada	Two Sisters
1992	Best Film Award	Tampere Film Festival, Finland	Two Sisters
1992	Silver Apple Award	National Educational Media Network Competition, United States	Two Sisters
1992	Grand Prize of the Festival: Best Story	Ottawa International Animation Festival, Canada	Two Sisters

=== Other awards ===
- 1994: Norman McLaren Award
- 1996: Life Achievement Award, World Festival of Animated Film - Animafest Zagreb
- 2017: Winsor McCay Award (Life Achievement, Annie Awards)
- 2019: Dragon of Dragons Award, Kraków Film Festival

=== Nominations ===
- 1977: Academy Award for The Street
