= Mary K. Okheena =

Canadian Inuvialuk graphic artist

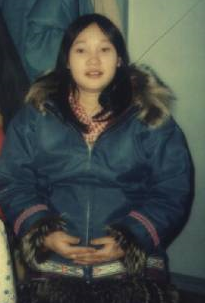
- Mary K. Okheena in 1977, at Holman (Ulukhaktok)
- Born: 1957 (age 68–69); Holman (Uluqsaqtuuq), Northwest Territories

Mary Kapbak Okheena (also goes by Memorana, Krappak, Kappak) is an Inuvialuk graphic artist known for her stencil prints including "Musk-ox Waiting for the Tide to Cross Water" (1986) and "Shaman Dances to Northern Lights" (1991), drawings and embroidery. She is part of the third generation of organized graphic artists in the Canadian Arctic. Okheena has five children with her husband Eddie and she currently lives in Ulukhaktok where she practices embroidery and makes wall hangings.

== Biography ==
=== Early life ===
Okheena was born in 1957 in Holman (Uluqsaqtuuq), King’s Bay, Victoria Island, Northwest Territories. Her father Jimmy Memorana was a sculptor and printmaker and helped found the Holman Island Eskimo Co-operative. Her mother, Nora Memorana, was an expert sewer. Both Jimmy and Nora were respected drum dancers in their communities. Okheena grew up watching her father and her aunt Agnes Nanogak Goose make prints for the Holman Print Shop (part of the Holman Island Eskimo Co-operative) inspiring her career in printing.

=== Career ===
Mary K. Okheena started drawing in her teens and at the age of nineteen. In 1977 she sold her first drawing. She was invited by the Roman Catholic missionary, Father Henri Tardy, OMI (born on 28 November 1917, in Vidalon-lès-Annonay, today a hamlet in the commune of Davézieux, Ardèche, France where the Montgofier family manufactured paper since 1534; he died February 7, 2004, in St. Albert, Alberta, aged 86), to help with stencil printing after she made a large embroidery design for his church. Father Tardy, who introduced printmaking to Holman and then co-founded the Holman Eskimo Co-operative in 1961 (renamed the Ulukahaktok Arts Centre following the change of the community name), taught Okheena how to make waxed-paper stencils. She started printing in 1977 when John Rose, the Holman Print Shop manager, asked her to come and learn printmaking. Okheena began her professional printing career by printing other artists’ images, which are included in annual Holman print collections from 1979 and 1980-1981. In 1986, Okheena began printing her own works at the Holman Print Shop after her prints were rejected by the Canadian Eskimo Council in 1984. Between 1977 and 1982, Okheena intermittently worked at the Holman Print Shop during the birth and infancy of her eldest children. Okheena worked for the Holman Print Shop longer than any artist currently working there.

She eventually left the print shop partly because of health problems caused by printmaking chemicals and set up a home studio. Okheena also spends her time crocheting, quilting, carving, making wall hangings, and sewing clothing for her family.

Okheena has also illustrated John Bierhorst’s 1997 children’s book called The Dancing Fox: Arctic Folktales.

== Artwork ==
=== Print ===
Mary K. Okheena uses a specific stencil technique in her prints to achieve subtle and luminous gradations of colour. Okheena abstracts formal qualities of animal and human forms. She is often inspired by children’s facial expressions, and often uses culturally symbolic images in her work such as the inukshuk. She has created her own form of storytelling, by reflecting the dual traditions of Holman Inuvialuit families and those of the resident Copper Inuit (as seen in Shaman Dances to Northern Lights). She combines an Inuit aesthetic with influence from Southern culture and uses Western artistic devices.

Over her career, she has had 74 of her drawings made into prints, and 36 she printed herself. She has also printed 31 works from other artists’ designs. In 1988, Mary K. Okheena was commissioned to create a print for the cover of the Northwest Territories Telephones’ telephone directory.

== Major exhibitions ==
- 1989 - Contemporary Inuit Drawings at the Art Gallery of Guelph
- 1993 - Inuit Art: Tradition and Regeneration at the Canadian Museum of History
- 1995 - Keeping Our Stories Alive: An Exhibition of the Art and Crafts from Dene and Inuit of Canada at Institute of American Indian Arts Museum
- 2001 - Holman: Forty Years of Graphic Art organised by the Winnipeg Art Gallery

== Public collections ==
A number of museums and galleries that have her prints in their permanent collections include the Canadian Museum of History, Prince of Wales Northern Heritage Centre in Yellowknife, Museum of Fine Arts, Boston, and the Winnipeg Art Gallery.
