= Interview (1979 film) =

1979 Canadian short animated documentary film

- Directed by: Caroline Leaf; Veronika Soul
- Produced by: David Verrall
- Narrated by: Caroline Leaf; Veronika Soul
- Cinematography: Jacques Avoine, Richard Moras, Robert Humble
- Edited by: Caroline Leaf; Veronika Soul
- Music by: Richard Baskin
- Animation by: Caroline Leaf; Veronika Soul
- Production company: National Film Board of Canada
- Distributed by: Serious Business
- Release date: 1979
- Running time: 14 minutes
- Country: Canada
- Language: English

Interview is a 1979 Canadian short live-action animated documentary film directed by Caroline Leaf and Veronika Soul, produced by David Verrall. The film is a record of a working day in the lives of two women filmmakers, sometimes described as "an autobiographical collaboration", though both filmmakers are discussing the other woman. The film is also seen as a study of female friendship, the women relating their perceptions of each other through their respective animation techniques, "each creating a visual portrait of the other based on characteristic gestures and impressions."

== Synopsis ==
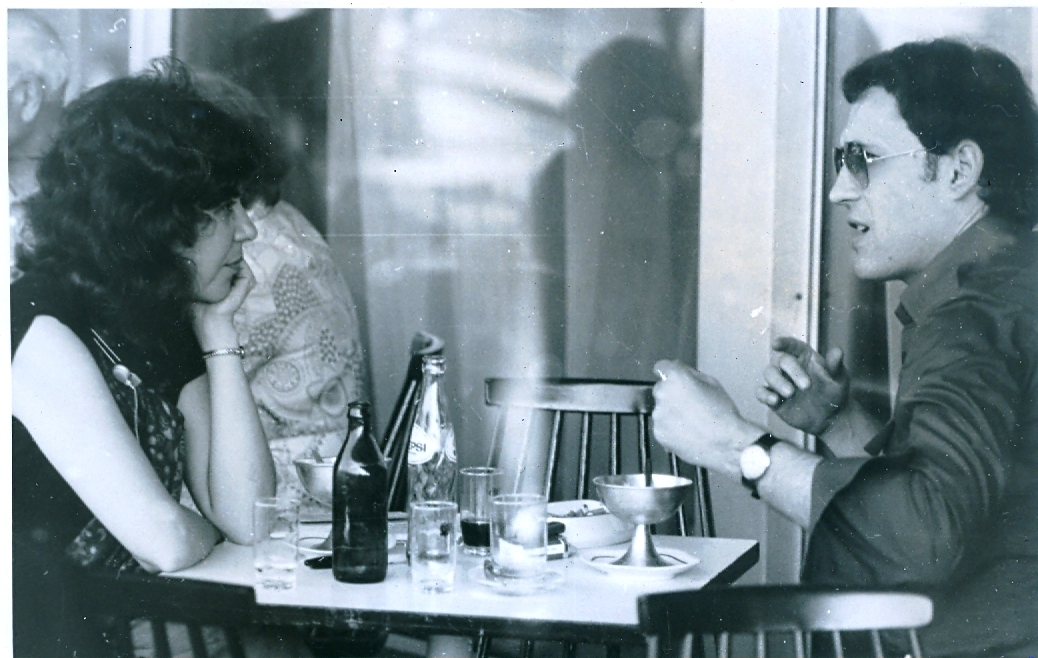
Caroline Leaf, with art historian Ranko Munitić, in Belgrade, Serbia, 1979

A summary statement from Caroline Leaf's web site reads as follows: "The film is a record of a working day in the lives of two women filmmakers, Caroline Leaf and Veronika Soul. They are seen as friends, as filmmakers, and as individuals whose personalities are contrasted by the things they say of themselves and each other, and by the different animation techniques they use to portray themselves." The women discuss their everyday lives "with irony and humour at the same time revealing their feelings and concerns when speaking about love, loneliness or devotion to art."

== Themes and analysis ==
I look at the film now and wonder why we included certain things we did. There was a lot of nonsense there. I think we were just having fun. There wasn't much planning but we were seeking to say a certain amount about our work habits. We thought that everything about living related to work, so we included a very broad range of things as the subject matter for the film.

— Caroline Leaf (interviewed in 2002)

=== Work and life ===
Giannalberto Bendazzi remarks that Interview describes "how work as a filmmaker influences both women's daily lives and, at the same time, how their daily lives shape their works." María Lorenzo Hernández noted in 2010 that this is in sharp contrast to previous autobiographical animated films by men: (Note: Films she discussed in a 2010 companion article.) unlike the men, Leaf and Soul "delved in the identity of the animatrice by sharing with the audience their creative process, depicted as a personal, almost intimate experience." In 2015, she remarked further that the "mutual interview as modus operandi reinforces" the documentary perspective. Leaf and Soul "deliver a reflection on animation as a medium, and as a mode of living, appearing as independent women who work autonomously – but not in creative isolation. They establish a dialogue with other artists, other women, legitimating unconventional animation processes. Both have opposite views on animation, yet they can create together."

=== Play ===
A statement appearing with the film's entry at the Krakow Film Festival's 50th anniversary retrospective describes the film as "a game played with the form and techniques of animation." In the 2002 interview, in addition to saying the directors were just "having fun" while making Interview, Leaf said that she and Soul were "playing with the audience" in response to suggestions of a deeper intimacy ("a sexual connotation") in the film.

== Production ==
=== Background and development ===
Caroline Leaf moved to Canada from the U.S. in 1970, eventually settling in Montréal where she was invited to work for the National Film Board of Canada, and where fellow American expatriate Veronika Soul had also been living since 1970 or 1971.

Leaf recalled some twenty years later that the idea for Interview began as "murmurs in the corridors at the Film Board that there was going to be a series of films about the animation directors" at the Board's animation unit: "I thought it would be fun to do one about ourselves." It was something of a departure for Leaf: this would be the first time she was not taking "someone else's story": "I was making my own story with Veronica." Leaf was "blinded" by the film's revelations about her own shyness and awkwardness and said she was still "uncomfortable" watching it with an audience as late as 2002.

Still image from Interview, featuring Leaf's paint-on-glass technique, the women seated at a table while two standing shadowy figures look on.

=== Filming, animation, and editing ===
Leaf and Soul "interviewed each other extensively" and then selected different parts to animate. The released film is a combination of still photographs, live action and animation, something Leaf had never before attempted.

Leaf's animation technique is paint on glass, while Soul's is based on collage. Leaf was quoted as saying her animations of allowed for subtle qualities which could not be achieved with a camera. She found editing the film particularly exciting "because the 'chunks' that fit together could have gone in any kind of order."

== Release ==
In a post on his blog in 2007, American animator Michael Sporn recalled seeing Interview at the Ottawa International Animation Festival in 1980, and the film's mounting success: "The film followed the festival circuit back then, and I got to see it another half dozen or so times. It kept opening larger and larger the more I'd seen it. Paul Wells, citing Hungarian animator John Halas (1987) (Note: Masters of Animation London: BBC Books.) reports that, along with Leaf's other films made in the 1970s, Interview "consolidated her place as one of the acknowledged "masters" of animation."

=== Home media ===
Interview is included in a 147-minute anthology of films by women animators released on VHS as a set of two videocassettes in the Conoisseur animation series, titled Wayward girls & wicked women, 1991-1992. A 72-minute box set DVD was released in 2010, titled Caroline Leaf: Out on a Limb - Hand-Crafted Cinema, containing this short and several other works by Leaf.

=== Streaming ===
The short is available for streaming by subscription from the National Film Board of Canada (CAMPUS).

== Reception ==
=== Critical response ===
Sporn remarked: "This was quite an unexpected and daring film, at the time, and it involved resetting our gears. (It's well worth viewing if you can.)" Jean-François Hamel wrote of Interview that, as is always the case with Leaf's films, the spectator is captivated, entertained and stimulated by a true and sincere artist and that what comes across through the film is what he calls her "humanism", manifest through her artistry and technique. Lorenzo Hernández describes the film as "pioneering" in terms of its personal themes, and its final scene, showing Leaf and Soul working together, is "beautiful". Julie Roy considers the filmmakers' styllistic freedom to be the principle attractive quality of the work, the two biographical portraits developing in parallel as in a conversation, apparently spontaneously, like a modern video diary, confiding with each other, all in a confident tone of voice.

=== Accolades ===
1979

- Montréal World Film Festival, Jury Award for Best Short Film
- World Festival of Animated Film, Varna, Bulgaria, First Prize - Category: Films from 5 to 15 minutes

1981

- Melbourne International Film Festival, Grand Prix - Golden Boomerang and Victorian Government Cash Prize of A$4,000
