= The Street (1976 film) =

1976 short film by Caroline Leaf

- Directed by: Caroline Leaf
- Produced by: Guy Glover; Wolf Koenig (exec.)
- Starring: Voices: Mort Ransen; Vera Heitman; Sarah Dwight; John Hood; Howard Ryshpan
- Edited by: Gloria Demers (sound)
- Production company: National Film Board of Canada
- Distributed by: National Film Board of Canada
- Release date: 1976
- Running time: 10 minutes
- Country: Canada
- Language: English
- Budget: $49,223 (equivalent to $259,885 in 2025).

The Street is a 1976 animated short film by Caroline Leaf for the National Film Board of Canada.

== Summary ==
Based on a short story of the same name by Mordecai Richler about the reactions of members of a Jewish family to the death of a grandmother, the film makes a strong statement about how many families respond to their old and infirm members. In paint on glass animation, with washes of watercolour and ink, Leaf illustrates reactions to a dying grandmother, captures the subjects' feelings and distills them into harsh reality.

== Reception and legacy ==
In addition to its numerous film festival awards, in 1984, the Olympiad of Animation, sponsored by the International Animated Film Association (ASIFA) and the Los Angeles Olympic Organizing Committee, named The Street the 2nd Best Film of All Time (Skazka Skazok, or Tale of Tales, was #1). In 1991, for the 50th anniversary of the founding of ASIFA, a list of "Best Films of All Time: 50 Animated Films for the 50th" was created; The Street was ranked at number nine.

=== Awards ===
- Ottawa International Animation Festival: Grand Prize of the Festival, 1976
- Chicago International Film Festival: Gold Hugo, 1976
- 27th Canadian Film Awards, Toronto: Best Animated Film, 1976
- 27th Canadian Film Awards, Toronto: Wendy Michener Award for Caroline Leaf’s "contribution to the art of animation" in The Street.
- Golden Gate International Film Festival, San Francisco: Certificate for Outstanding achievement, Short Film, 1976
- ALA Notable Children's Films, 1976.
- American Film and Video Festival, New York: Blue Ribbon, Language Arts, 1977
- Cork International Film Festival: First Prize – Bronze Statuette of St. Finbarr, Animated Films, 1977
- Melbourne Film Festival, Melbourne: Special Prize of the Jury, 1977
- Columbus International Film & Animation Festival, Columbus, Ohio: Chris Bronze Plaque, 1977
- Roshd International Film Festival, Tehran: Special Award of the Ministry of Culture and Arts, 1977
- High Plains Film Festival, Texas Tech University: First Prize, 1977
- CINANIMA: Espinho International Animation Film Festival, Espinho, Portugal: Silver Dolphin for Best Film, 3–11 minutes, 1977
- Lille International Short Film Festival, Lille: Special Jury Mention, 1977
- Huesca International Film Festival, Huesca: Best Animation Film, 1978
- 49th Academy Awards: Nominee: Academy Award for Best Animated Short Film, 1977

== Works cited ==
- Evans, Gary (1991). In the National Interest: A Chronicle of the National Film Board of Canada from 1949 to 1989. University of Toronto Press. ISBN 0802027849.
