= José María Escriche =

José María Escriche Otal
- Born: José María Escriche Otal; 14 September 1950; Huesca, Spain
- Died: 29 March 2008 (aged 57)
- Occupations: Civil servant, cinema festival director
- Years active: 1973–2008

José María Escriche Otal (1950–2008) was a civil servant and film festival director from Aragon, Spain. In 1973, he founded the Huesca International Film Festival and headed it until his death in 2008.

== Biography ==
José María Escriche Otal was born in Huesca, Spain, in 1950.

In 1973, he was elected president of the Peña Recreativa Zoiti organization. In the same year, on the basis of Peña Zoiti cinema club, he founded the Huesca International Film Festival, driven by the dream to promote the short film genre and make it as popular and respected as the full meter one. He served as the event director for 30 years and succeeded to turn it from a small local initiative into a prestigious international gathering.

In 1978, he headed the newly created Asociación Cultural Certamen Internacional de Films Cortos Ciudad de Huesca. As a politician and a state official, he occupied various posts. For 13 years (1983–1996), Escriche was a deputy mayor of Huesca. He also was a councilor of the Department of Cultural Affairs of Huesca, a member of the Aragonese Council of Artistic Education and a founding member of the European Film Festivals Coordination. As a cinema professional, he was a member of different international juries in Europe and America. In 2004, he co-created the Huesca Film Festival Foundation. Escriche was in charge of renovation of the Fiestas celebrativas de San Lorenzo.

In 2008, he was posthumously granted the City of Huesca Award.

The Pepe Escriche Award was established by the Huesca International Film Festival in 2009 in his honour.
