= Study of a River =

- Directed by: Peter Hutton
- Release date: 1997
- Running time: 16 minutes
- Country: United States
- Language: Silent

Study of a River is a 1997 experimental film directed by Peter Hutton.

The experimental film focuses on the first part of a winter seasonal study of the Hudson River.

It won "Most Overlooked Short Film Award" at the 1997 Oberhausen International Short Film Festival.

In 2010, It was selected for preservation in the National Film Registry by the Library of Congress as being "culturally, historically, or aesthetically significant".

== See also ==
- 1997 in film
