= Su Dabao =

Chinese performance artist

Su Dabao (Chinese: 苏大宝) is a Chinese visual artist, known as a performer of sand animation. He performs his sand painting live on a stage, adding music and lighting.
