= Chinese Wit, Wisdom, and Written Characters =

1944 book by Rose Quong

- First edition
- Author: Rose Quong
- Language: English
- Genre: Non-fiction
- Publisher: Pantheon Press
- Publication date: 1944
- Publication place: United States

Chinese Wit, Wisdom, and Written Characters is a book of about 100 pages by Rose Quong, first published in 1944 by Pantheon Press in New York City. It was subsequently republished on several occasions with varying titles. It explains the composition of Chinese characters in terms of the meaning of their components and of some idiomatic words and expressions in terms of their component words. The author's purpose is more to give insight into Chinese culture than to give a general exposition of the composition of Chinese characters.
