= No Picnic =

- Directed by: Philip Hartman
- Written by: Philip Hartman
- Produced by: Doris Kornish
- Starring: David Brisbin; Clare Bauman; Judith Malina; Ryan Cutrona; Anne D'Agnillo; Luis Guzmán; Richard Hell; Steve Buscemi
- Cinematography: Peter Hutton
- Edited by: Grace Tankersley
- Production companies: Films Charas; Great Jones Film Group
- Release date: 1986
- Running time: 84 minutes
- Country: United States
- Language: English
- Box office: $95,696

No Picnic is a 1986 American comedy drama film written and directed by Philip Hartman. It was shot in black and white in New York in 1985 and was released at the 1986 Sundance Film Festival, where it won an award for "Excellence in Cinematography" in the "Dramatic" category. Described as "a cinematic love letter to a pre-gentrified New York", the film captures the East Village of the 1980s. It stars David Brisbin, Richard Hell, Judith Malina, and Luis Guzmán, and has a brief appearance from Steve Buscemi.

== Plot ==
Failed musician Macabee "Mac" Cohn makes his living servicing jukeboxes in the neighborhood, while in the search for the woman of his dreams. The obvious gentrification around is distressing and highlights his ill-fated life. His frustration increases when faced with individuals who remind him of his former aspirations.

== Music ==
The soundtrack includes performances from "The Raunch Hands", Lenny Kaye, Charles Mingus, Fela Kuti, Richard Hell, and "Student Teachers".

== Cast ==
- David Brisbin as Macabee "Mac" Cohn
- Clare Bauman as The Fan
- Ryan Cutrona as Live Pimp
- Anne D'Agnillo as Anne
- Luis Guzmán as Arroyo
- Richard Hell as Irate Tenant
- Steve Buscemi as Dead Pimp
- David Murray Jaffe as Big Pig Manager
