= Rose Quong =

Australian-American actress

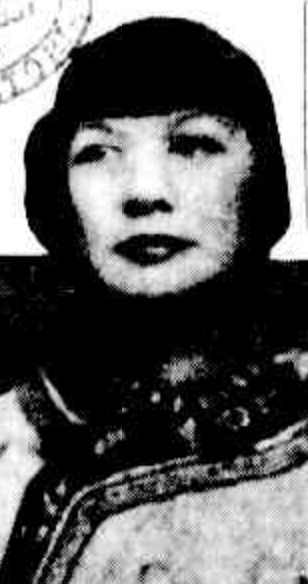
- Rose Quong, photographed in London, from a 1937 Australian newspaper.
- Born: Rose Maud Quong; 15 August 1879; East Melbourne, Australia
- Died: 14 December 1972; New York City
- Occupation: Actress

Rose Maud Quong (15 August 1879 – 14 December 1972) was a Chinese Australian actress, performer and writer.

== Early life ==
Born in East Melbourne, Australia to merchant Chun Quong and Annie née Moy Quong, Rose Maud Quong grew up in Melbourne, where she attended University High School and passed her matriculation exams. At one time she intended to study medicine, but from 1897 to 1919 was employed as a public servant in a variety of clerical roles. Quong showed great interest in amateur theatricals, winning competitions and performing with the Melbourne Repertory Players until in 1924, at age 44, she won a scholarship to study drama in England.

She opened in several plays in 1924, receiving excellent reviews from critics. Over the next fifteen years she learnt Mandarin, studied Chinese culture, lectured, recited Chinese poetry and acted in England and France before visiting the United States for the first time in 1934 on tour. Her biographer, Angela Woollacott, notes that the Australian expatriate community in London embraced her, despite the aims of Australia's own White Australia Policy.

In 1936 she made her only trip to China, where she lectured to elite audiences, in Mandarin. She returned to the United States on a lecture tour in January 1939 and remained permanently, settling in New York City.

== Life in United States ==
Quong continued her acting career in the United States, and also delivered lectures on Chinese drama, art, and culture. She performed primarily in theatre, but had several film roles to her credit, including a small part in Flower Drum Song. The backbone of Quong's career in the United States was a series of one-woman shows, consisting of recitations, dramatic readings, and scenes from plays. She authored two books: Chinese Wit, Wisdom, and Written Characters, and a translation of selected stories from P'u Sung-Ling's Strange Tales from a Chinese Studio under the title Chinese Ghost and Love Stories. Her last role was in a 1971 film, Eliza's Horoscope. To supplement her income as an actress, Quong occasionally took on other jobs, working as a secretary.

== Interests ==
Quong was deeply interested in Chinese philosophy, and studied it for much of her life; her presentations frequently included material from the I Ching. She also studied yoga, astrology, and Chinese history. A voracious reader, she maintained reading lists and took copious notes on her reading.

== Death ==
Rose Quong died in New York City in 1972.
