= Tracks (2003 film) =

2003 animated short film by Corrie Francis Parks

"Tracks" is a 2003 animated short film by Corrie Francis Parks. The film is created with sand animation on a colored background, making it unique in the genre of sand animation films. The film features music from the group Iguewa Ni Mbia from Cameroon and is an impressionistic journey through the African savannah. The film has been shown at the Hiroshima International Animation Festival, Anima Mundi, Melbourne International Animation Festival and Tehran International Animation Festival
