= Peter Hutton (filmmaker) =

American filmmaker (1944–2016)

Peter Barrington Hutton (August 24, 1944 – June 25, 2016) was an American experimental filmmaker, known primarily for his silent cinematic portraits of cities and landscapes around the world. He also worked as a professional cinematographer, most notably for his former student Ken Burns, as well as cinematography for Lizzie Borden's Born in Flames, Phil Hartman's No Picnic, assorted films by artist Red Grooms and Albert Maysles' The Gates.

== Early life and education ==
Hutton was born August 24, 1944 in Detroit, Michigan to Donald and Dorothy Hutton. He had a twin sister Wendy and a brother William. His father was a merchant seaman.

Hutton studied painting at an art school in Hawaii, working as a Merchant Marine to pay his way. He studied filmmaking at the San Francisco Art Institute, where he was a student of Robert Nelson. He earned a master's degree in fine arts.

== Career ==
In 1987, Hutton was awarded Best Cinematography for his work on Phil Hartman's feature film No Picnic at the Sundance Film Festival.

In 2011, the National Film Registry of the Library of Congress selected Study of a River as one of 25 films annually chosen. He taught filmmaking at CalArts, Hampshire College, Harvard University, SUNY Purchase, and Bard College, where he had been a professor of film since 1984 and later directed the Film and Electronic Arts program.

Much of Hutton's career was influenced by his time in the merchant marines.

Hutton's films are distributed by Canyon Cinema in San Francisco and Arsenal – Institut für Film und Videokunst in Berlin. In May 2008 the Museum of Modern Art in New York held a full retrospective of Hutton's films. His most recent work, Three Landscapes, premiered at the Toronto International Film Festival in September 2013.

Hutton died of cancer at the age of 71 on June 25, 2016. Director Kelly Reichardt dedicated her 2019 film First Cow to him, paying homage through a long static shot of a barge moving down the Columbia River.

== Selected filmography ==
- In Marin County (1970)
- July '71 in San Francisco, Living at Beach Street, Working at Canyon Cinema, Swimming in the Valley of the Moon (1971)
- New York Near Sleep for Saskia (1972)
- Images of Asian Music (A Diary from Life 1973–1974) (1973–1974)
- Florence (1975)
- Boston Fire (1979)
- New York Portrait: Chapter One (1978–1979)
- New York Portrait: Chapter Two (1980–1981)
- Budapest Portrait (Memories of a City) (1984–1986)
- Landscape for Manon (1986)
- New York Portrait: Chapter Three (1990)
- In Titan's Goblet (1991)
- Lodz Symphony (1991–1993)
- Study of a River (1996–1997)
- Time and Tide (2000)
- Looking at the Sea (2001)
- Two Rivers (2001–2002)
- Skagafjordur (2002–2004)
- At Sea (2007)
- Three Landscapes (2013)

== Exhibitions ==
- 2010: Les Rencontres d'Arles, France.
