= Svetlana Telbukh =

Ukrainian performance artist

- Known for: Artist
- Movement: Sand animation
- Website: sandelf.show

Svetlana Telbukh (also known by her stage name Lana Telbukh) is a Ukrainian artist whose specialty is performing sand animation.

== Background ==
=== Career ===
After completing her architectural studies at the Academy of Architecture in Kharkiv, Telbukh later pursued sand painting. Her initial sand art performance, showcased on the television program Das Supertalent, garnered national attention. On German Unity Day (October 3, 2019) ,Telbukh performed live on ZDF, broadcasting from Kiel, Schleswig-Holstein.

In 2023, at the University Summer Ball at RPTU Kaiserslautern-Landau, Telbukh performed live sand art with her images projected in real time as part of a world-travel themed show.

In January 2025, Telbukh participated as a sand artist in a celebrated New Year’s concert at the Stadttheater Bremerhaven, where she created live sand illustrations to accompany performances by the Philharmonisches Orchester Bremerhaven. She also provided live sand animation during the 2nd Philharmonic Concert “Schumann Open” with the Clara‑Schumann‑Philharmoniker Plauen‑Zwickau, accompanying works including Peer Baierlein’s commissioned piece Davids Bündler and Schumann’s Piano Concerto performed by pianist Rei Harada.

In May 2025, Telbukh performed live sand art alongside Remo Forrer at the TRIPLE live – Sand & Sound concert in Frauenfeld, Switzerland, where she created real‑time sand images to accompany the unplugged music.

In October 2025, to mark the 700‑year anniversary of Le Landeron in Switzerland, Telbukh created a 45‑minute sand animation performance combining narration, light design, and her sand art as part of the “Sable et lumière” closing celebrations. Telbukh performed live sand animation to accompany a concert performance of Antonín Dvořák’s dramatic cantata The Spectre’s Bride (“Die Geisterbraut”) at Theater Hof in Germany.

=== Musical video projects ===
- 2024: I had a dream, Sand animation video, dedicated to marking the anniversary of the Russian invasion of Ukraine
- 2023: Requiem for Larissa. Goodbye world, Sand animation video
- 2022: A story about two sisters, Sand animation video
- 2021: Magic Song, music video for Warner Music, awarded by the Royal Society of Television & Motion Picture

=== Film festivals and awards ===
Year	Festival	Country	Award	Result
2024	Broad Leaf International Film Festival	India	Best animated short film Best micro short film	Winner
2024	Berlin Short Film Festival	Berlin, Germany	Best Animation	Winner
2024	Festival de Indie	Chennai, India	Best Fantasy Film	Official Selection
2024	Bestlov Film Festival	Online Festival	Music Video	Winner
2024	BLASTOFF Festival	California, the USA	Music Video	Quarter-finalist
2024	Prague International Music Video Awards	Prague, Czech Republic	Best Classic Music Video Category	Winner
2024	Cinema World Fest Awards	Los Angeles, the USA	Music Video	Winner
2024	WorldFest-Houston International Film Festival	Houston, The USA	351 - Experimental - Animated film	Winner
2023	Global Music Awards	California, the USA	Best Music Video	Silver winner
2023	Euro Music Video Song	Kosice, Slovakia	Best Classic Music Video	Winner
2023	Tatras International Film Festival	the High Tatras, Slovakia	Best Animation	Winner
2023	Prague International Music Video Awards	Prague, Czech Republic	Best Classic Music Video	Winner
