= Wendy Michener Award =

Discontinued annual Canadian media award

The Wendy Michener Award was a Canadian film award, presented by the Canadian Film Awards from 1969 to 1978 as a special achievement award for outstanding artistic achievements in film.

== Origins ==
The award was created in memory of Wendy Michener, an arts journalist and film critic who was the daughter of former Governor General Roland Michener and his wife Norah Michener, following her death in 1969.

== History ==
The award's purpose varied, as it was sometimes presented for unspecified general artistic achievements and other times for specific individual films; it was most commonly, but not always, used to honour emerging filmmakers for their breakthrough works.

At the 25th Canadian Film Awards in 1973, it was controversially awarded to film director Gilles Carle for "outstanding contribution to the Canadian Film Awards and the Canadian film industry", even though Carle had been one of the signatories to the boycott letter that precipitated the cancellation of that year's ceremony.

The award was not always presented annually, and was discontinued when the Canadian Film Awards transitioned into the new Genie Awards in 1980.

== Winners ==
- 1969 - Jean-Claude Labrecque
- 1970 - Jean Pierre Lefebvre
- 1971 - none
- 1972 - Mireille Dansereau, Dream Life (La Vie rêvée)
- 1973 - Gilles Carle
- 1974 - none
- 1975 - none
- 1976 - Caroline Leaf, The Street
- 1977 - Zale Dalen, Skip Tracer
- 1978 - Richard Gabourie, Three Card Monte
