= At Sea =

2007 experimental film by Peter Hutton

- Directed by: Peter Hutton
- Release date: 2007
- Running time: 60 minutes
- Country: United States

At Sea is a 2007 American experimental documentary film directed by Peter Hutton. Shot on 16 mm film over the course of three years, it follows the "birth, life and death" of a container ship, from its construction in a South Korean dockyard to its travels on the Atlantic Ocean and eventual beaching in Bangladesh, where ship breakers labor for scrap.

At Sea was voted the best avant-garde film of the past decade in a 2011 Film Comment poll.

== Production ==
Filmmaker and former merchant seaman Peter Hutton conceived At Sea after completing the 2004 short film Skagafjördur, which was shot in Iceland. In 2004, Hutton visited Chittagong, Bangladesh, with the idea of making a film about ship breaking, but he was only able to shoot for "a couple of hours". The following summer, Hutton traveled to Geoje, South Korea, where he gathered footage at the Daewoo Shipbuilding & Marine Engineering (DSME) shipyard; and in 2006, Hutton filmed the ship's voyage on the Atlantic Ocean. During this time, Hutton was considering titling the film How the World Works.
