= Robert Bradbrook =

English filmmaker and animator

- Born: 1965 (age 60–61)
- Occupations: Filmmaker, Animator

Robert Bradbrook is an English independent filmmaker and animator. He began his career as a cartographer before turning to making films.

== Early life and education ==
Bradbrook was born in 1965. He received a Masters in Art degree in Electronics and Graphics from Coventry University.

== Career ==
In addition to his work as a filmmaker, Bradbrook is the Head of Animation at National Film and Television School (NFTS).

== Films ==
His film Home Road Movies, a true story of his father and their family car, was completed in 2001. Home Road Movies was nominated as Best Animated Short at the 55th British Academy Film Awards and received the Grand Prize at the 2002 Ottawa International Animation Festival.

Other films include The Sleeper, End of Restriction and Dead Air. He collaborated with other filmmakers such as Yousaf Ali Khan and Jonathan Hodgson.

== Personal life ==
Bradbrook currently resides in London.
