= Dukascopy Bank =

Swiss online bank

Dukascopy Bank SA
- Industry: Financial services, foreign exchange market, money market
- Founded: 2004
- Founders: Andre Duka, Veronika Duka
- Headquarters: Route de Pré-Bois 20 Meyrin, Geneva, Switzerland
- Key people: Andre Duka (CEO & CTO); Veronika Duka (Chief administrative officer); Irina Kupriyanova Vedeneeva (Chief financial officer); Andrei Bagautdinov (Chief integration officer); Wajih Rais (Chief risk officer)
- Services: Currency trading, online trading, banking
- Number of employees: 300+
- Subsidiaries: Dukascopy Europe IBS AS, Dukascopy Japan, SIA Dukascopy Payments
- Website: www.dukascopy.com

Dukascopy Bank is a Swiss online bank that provides online and mobile trading, banking, and financial services. Headquartered in Geneva, Switzerland, it also has offices in Riga and Tokyo, with over 300 employees.

== Services ==
Dukascopy Bank provides online and mobile trading services including foreign exchange, CFDs for stocks, metals, commodities, indices, cryptocurrencies, and binary options. Dukascopy Bank also offers current account, e-banking, and credit card services.

== Regulation ==
Dukascopy Bank is regulated by the Swiss Financial Market Supervisory Authority (FINMA) both as a bank and a securities dealer. It has three subsidiaries, namely Dukascopy Europe IBS AS, a licensed brokerage company based in Riga, Dukascopy Japan, a Type-1 licensed broker located in Tokyo, and SIA Dukascopy Payments, a European licensed payment and e-money company incorporated in Riga.

Dukascopy Bank is a member of the Swiss Bankers Association since 2012.

== History ==
In 2004, Andre Duka together with his partner Veronika Duka created Swiss brokerage house Dukascopy. In 2006, Dukascopy launched its ECN, the SWFX Swiss Forex Marketplace.

In August 2014, the district court of the canton of Zürich confirmed the conviction of three investment managers who had been found guilty in 2012 for churning clients' funds using Dukascopy's platform. Although no criminal charges were brought against Dukascopy, the bank was ordered to disgorge 775,000 francs of unlawful profit.

In January 2015, Dukascopy Bank SA acquired 100% of Alpari Japan K.K., Tokyo (a distressed subsidiary of Alpari Group). At the same time, Dukascopy, together with other brokers, campaigned for deregulation of the Swiss investment market.
