= Eliza's Horoscope =

1975 film

- Directed by: Gordon Sheppard
- Written by: Gordon Sheppard
- Produced by: Gordon Sheppard
- Starring: Elizabeth Moorman; Tommy Lee Jones; Rose Quong; Lila Kedrova; Pierre Byland; Marcel Sabourin; Alanis Obomsawin
- Cinematography: Jean Boffety; Michel Brault; Paul Van der Linden
- Edited by: Gordon Sheppard
- Music by: Elmo Peeler
- Distributed by: Akoom (Quebec)
- Release dates: September 1975 (Stratford International Film Festival); May 1976 (Montreal)
- Running time: 121 minutes
- Country: Canada
- Language: English
- Budget: $1,400,000 (estimated)

Eliza's Horoscope is a 1975 Canadian feature from Gordon Sheppard, one of the most enigmatic features made in Canada.

== Background ==
Gordon Sheppard (1937–2006) began his career with the Canadian Broadcasting Corporation in 1960 as a writer and interviewer on public affairs programs such as "The Lively Arts." His 1962 film about Hugh Hefner, The Most, was praised by Roger Ebert as "a great documentary short." In 1965 he was appointed to the Secretary of State as a special consultant on a proposal to create the Canadian Film Development Corporation (later Telefilm Canada). Leaving government service, Sheppard began work on his flawed masterpiece, which was originally titled Susan's Horoscope. After drafting a script, he approached Hefner for financial support. Hefner invited him to the Chicago Playboy Club to discuss the idea, and though he ultimately wasn't interested, this visit led to Sheppard meeting Elizabeth Moorman, who was working as a Playboy Bunny at the Chicago club at the time. Sheppard convinced Moorman to join him in Montreal and renamed the project Eliza's Horoscope after her. A ten-minute film was shot in 1969, but the feature was not completed until 1974 (which explains why there are three cinematographers on the film).

== Synopsis ==
The central character is an eighteen-year-old woman named Eliza (Elizabeth Moorman), who learns from an astrologer that she will meet a rich husband and proceeds to look for one. She rooms with an older prostitute (Lila Kedrova, the veteran Russian-born actress who had won an Oscar for Zorba the Greek) in a rundown Montreal apartment where a young man of mixed indigenous and European heritage (Tommy Lee Jones in one of his first screen appearances) falls for her. Later he is killed trying to blow up a bridge as a form of protest. Heavily allegorical and densely symbolic, Eliza's Horoscope is a psychedelic film left over from the 1960s – closer to Bob Rafelson’s Head than Federico Fellini’s Juliet of the Spirits. Richard Manuel, formerly of the legendary Canadian group The Band, appears as a background extra in the film.

== Awards ==
Canadian Film Awards – Supporting Actress (Kedrova), Cinematography (van der Linden), Art Direction, Overall Sound, Special Award

It was also a nominee for Best Feature Film, but did not win.
