= Two Sisters (1991 film) =

- Directed by: Caroline Leaf
- Written by: Caroline Leaf
- Produced by: Robert Forget; Yves Leduc; Dagmar Teufel; Jacques Vallée
- Starring: Kathleen Fee; Michael Rudder; Jane Woods
- Edited by: Camille Laperrière
- Music by: Judith Gruber-Stitzer
- Distributed by: National Film Board of Canada
- Release date: 1991
- Running time: 10 minutes
- Country: Canada
- Languages: English and French

Two Sisters (Original title: Entre deux soeurs) is a 1991 animated short by Caroline Leaf, and produced for the National Film Board of Canada by Robert Forget, Yves Leduc, Dagmar Teufel and Jacques Vallée.

The film tells the story of two sisters who live a self-contained existence until the arrival of a stranger throws their ordered life into chaos. It took Leaf a year and half to make the film.

== Plot ==
Viola, a writer with a severely deformed face, lives on an isolated island with her sister Marie. Viola spends her time in a darkened room writing, while Marie cares for her.

Uninvited, an unknown man swims to their house and walks in. Both sisters, frightened and confused, call out for each other. The man explains that he has come to see Viola Gé. He shows them both a copy of one of Viola's works. Viola walks up to the man, while covering her deformed face with her hand. She takes her hand away from her face and says to him, "This is Viola Gé." The man tells Viola that he has read all of her work. He approaches Viola closely who covers her face again with her hand. He moves her hand and touches her. Marie interrupts and instructs the man that it is time he leaves. Marie then asks Viola to hand her her cup. The man goes to grab the cup for Marie, but cuts himself on the glass. As Marie cleans, the man asks Viola to write something for him. The man takes Viola's hand to leave with him. Marie tries to convince Viola not to leave the house, but she leaves regardless.

As Viola and the man stand outside, Viola writes (in French) "à un étranger qui me regarde en plein soleil," in his book. The man thanks her and leaves.

Viola returns to the house and sees that Marie is crying. Marie wipes away her tears and goes to close the door, but Viola instructs her to leave the door open. Marie warns that there are sharks outside, but Viola replies by saying how lucky she is to have her sister. Marie says the same to Viola. Viola goes back to writing, while Marie places her rocking chair in front of the door, hums a tune, and holds the key in her hands.

== Style ==
Caryn James of the New York Times noted that Leaf "entered a stunning new phase of her art" with Two Sisters. Made using the drawn on film animation technique, the film was etched by Leaf directly onto tinted 70 mm film. The film uses mainly green and black colours on screen, which depict heavily stylized and distorted features to the characters. Leaf herself "pioneered the techniques of animating sand and oil on a light box directly under a camera." Further adjustments were made directly on film for the swimming sequences of the film, including adding colour to the printing process in order to make the black areas appear blue. Leaf also painted directly on to film to add the appearance of blood when the unknown man cuts his finger.

== Influences ==
In an interview about her work for ASIFA, Leaf mentioned that the 1967 novel The Master and Margarita was an influence for Two Sisters. Several themes including the influence of a stranger, dependent relationships, and outside perceptions were an interest to Leaf in the making of the film.

== Reception ==
=== Critical response ===
The film holds a 6.2 rating out of 10 based on 234 reviews on IMDb. The film is generally praised by critics, winning multiple festival awards. Jeff Dick of the Library Journal called Two Sisters a "poignant story, highly recommended for film collections." Marylin Higgings of the School Library Journal called Two Sisters an "extraordinary and provocative animated film."

=== Accolades ===
Year	Film Festival	Award / Category	Ref
1991	Cinanima (Espinho, Portugal)	Award for the High Quality of Production: Films with a screening time from 10 to 40 minutes	
1991	International Animation Celebration (Los Angeles, United States)	Best Film or Video	
1991	International Short Film Festival (Uppsala, Sweden)	Best Animation	
1991	International Animated Film Festival (Annecy, France)	Best Film: Fiction, Short Film	
1992	International Film Festival (Tampere, Finland)	Best Film: Animation	
1992	National Educational Media Network Competition (Oakland, United States)	Silver Apple Award: Animation	
1992	Itinerant - American Film and Video Festival (Chicago, United States)	Honorable Mention: Family	
1992	International Animation Festival (Ottawa, Canada)	Grand Prize of the Festival: Best Story	
1992	International Animation Festival (Shanghai, China)	Special Jury Award	
1992	Quebec-Alberta Prizes (Television - Cinema) (Banff, Canada)	Alberta-Quebec Award - Innovative Cinema	
