= Agnes Nanogak =

Inuvialuit artist (1925–2001)

Agnes Nanogak Goose
- Born: 12 November 1925; Baillie Islands, Canada
- Died: 5 May 2001 (aged 75); Ulukhaktok, Northwest Territories, Canada
- Known for: Inuit prints and illustrations

Agnes Nanogak Goose (12 November 1925 – 5 May 2001) was an Inuvialuk artist from Holman (Ulukhaktok), Northwest Territories, Canada.

== Life ==
Nanogak was born on the Baillie Islands, Northwest Territories, in 1925. Her father, Natkutsiak (Billy Banksland) was from Nome, Alaska, and worked as a harpoonist on whaling boats. He sailed with explorer Vilhjalmur Stefansson in his attempt to find the Northwest Passage. Natkutsiak was a skilled story teller, and instilled in Nanogak an appreciation for legends and the tradition of story telling. Nanogak's mother, Topsy Ekiona, came from the Mackenzie Delta region, near Tuktoyaktuk. Ekiona and Natkutsiak married and travelled between Baillie Island and Banks Island, where a trading post afforded them trapping and trading opportunities. Nanogak and her brother, Alec Aliknak Banksland, were born on the Baillie Islands. The family relocated to Sachs Harbour on Banks Island before settling at Holman, on Victoria Island, in 1934, when Nanogak was nine years old. At the time, they were the only family to reside in Holman. In 1943, Nanogak married Wallace Goose from the Tuktoyaktuk, and Kugluktuk (Coppermine) areas. They had seven children.

In 1985, Nanogak received an honorary degree from Mount Saint Vincent University in Halifax, Nova Scotia. Nanogak is the first Inuk artist to receive an honorary degree from a university.

Nanogak was diagnosed with lung cancer in 2000. After the diagnosis, she describes feeling increased urgency to continue her work, so that she could "help people remember the stories." Nanogak died in Holman in 2001, and in 2002 the Winnipeg Art Gallery held a solo exhibition of her works. Her work has been featured in dozens of exhibitions across Canada, the United States, and Europe. Her artwork can be found in the collections of at least fifteen institutions across Canada and the United States.

== Career ==
Nanogak's father encouraged her to draw from an early age. She was part of the first generation of Inuit artists to provide drawings for Holman's printmaking program, starting in the 1960s. Her earliest drawings were completed using graphite pencils, however she opted to use colourful felt-tip pens when they became available to her in 1970. Her artwork is described as fluid, bold in colour, and having "nervous energy". Her early works centred on themes of childhood, drum songs, and Inuit life. Many of these drawings were later translated into prints, and by the end of her career she had contributed approximately one hundred forty images to a total of twenty annual print collections. Nanogak contributed to every print collection by the Holman artists' co-operative since 1967. In 1974, she collaborated with Caroline Leaf to produce the drawings for the National Film Board of Canada animated short, The Owl Who Married a Goose: An Eskimo Legend.

Nanogak is famous for her contributions as the illustrator of the children's books Tales from the Igloo (1972), and More Tales from the Igloo (1986), which feature Inuit legends translated into English by Father Maurice Metayer].

Her stories and drawings reflect her father's Alaskan roots and the Mackenzie Delta / Copper Inuit culture of her mother and husband. Both her son and grandson, Billy and Rex Goose, are considered talented graphic artists.

== List of works ==
- Metayer, Maurice & Nanogak, Agnes (ill.). Tales From the Igloo. Edmonton, Alberta: Hurtig, 1972.
- Nanogak, Agnes. Agnes Nanogak: A Retrospective, 1982–1985. Winnipeg, Manitoba: Canadian Arctic Producers, 1986.
- Nanogak, Agnes. More Tales From the Igloo. Edmonton, Alberta: Hurtig, 1986.
- Nanogak, Agnes. Agnes Nanogak's Song. Music of the Inuit (Sound Recording): The Copper Eskimo Tradition. Gentilly, France: Auvidis, 1994.
- Nanogak, Agnes. Furious Owl. [Reproduction] Inuit Art Quarterly 17.3 (Fall 2002): 10.
- Nanogak, Agnes. How Tugulak, the Raven, Stole the Sun. Across Time and Tundra: The Inuvialuit of the Western Arctic. Vancouver: Raincoast Books, 2003.
- Nanogak, Agnes. More Tales From the Igloo (Review). Queen's Quarterly 94.4 (Winter 1987): 1073.
- Nanogak, Agnes & Kalvak, Helen et al. Inuit Women Artists. Feminist Studies 10.1 (Spring 1984): 84–96.
- Nanogak, Agnes Down there is the person I'm chasing 1998 (Holman, Ulukhaktok, NWT)
