= Melbourne International Film Festival =

Annual Australian film festival

- Location: Melbourne, Victoria, Australia
- Founded: 1952
- Artistic director: Al Cossar
- No. of films: 300 (approx.)
- Website: www.miff.com.au

The Melbourne International Film Festival (MIFF) is an annual film festival held over three weeks in Melbourne, Victoria, Australia. It was founded in 1952 and is one of the oldest film festivals in the world following the founding of the Venice Film Festival in 1932, Cannes Film Festival in 1939 and Berlin Film Festival in 1951.

Currently held in the month of August from 8th to 25th in 2024 and spanning events in the Melbourne CBD as well as inner-suburban and regional Victoria, MIFF screens films from both Australia and across the world to an audience of approximately 150,000. It is the largest film festival in both Australia and the Southern Hemisphere, and is the world's largest showcase of new Australian cinema. The 2022 festival contributed A$9.7 million to the City of Melbourne's economy.

MIFF seeks to realize its stated vision of: “An enlightened, inclusive, engaged society through film”, via its industry programs (the co-financing fund Premiere Fund, the talent incubator program Accelerator Lab and the film-financing market 37°South), its skill-building initiatives for youth (MIFF Schools and Critics Campus), and the MIFF Awards that recognize both short- and longform filmmaking talent.

== History ==
In 1950, representatives of film societies in New South Wales and Victoria met in Sydney to discuss setting up a non-competitive film festival based on the Edinburgh International Film Festival, which had been formed three years earlier, to bring foreign language films and minority appeal films to Australia as the films were not shown in many Australian cinemas. In January 1952, representatives from both states launched the first Australian film festival in the Melbourne suburb of Olinda, Victoria. It was renamed the Melbourne Film Festival the following year and held this title over many decades before transforming into the Melbourne International Film Festival. It was soon decided that one festival was not sufficient for all of Australia and the Sydney Film Festival was founded in 1954. Appointed in 1956, Erwin Rado was the festival's first director, holding the role until 1979 and returning for a single-year stint in 1983; the Australian Dictionary of Biography notes that he shaped the film event's character with his “uncompromising drive for excellence”.

Following Rado, the festival was headed up by Geoffrey Gardner (1980–1982), Paul Seto (1984), Paul Coulter (1985), Santina Musumeci (1986–1987), Tait Brady (1988–1996), Sandra Sdraulig (1997–2000), James Hewison (2001–2006), Richard Moore (2007–2010), Michelle Carey (2011–2018) and current artistic director Al Cossar (2019–present).

== Film program ==
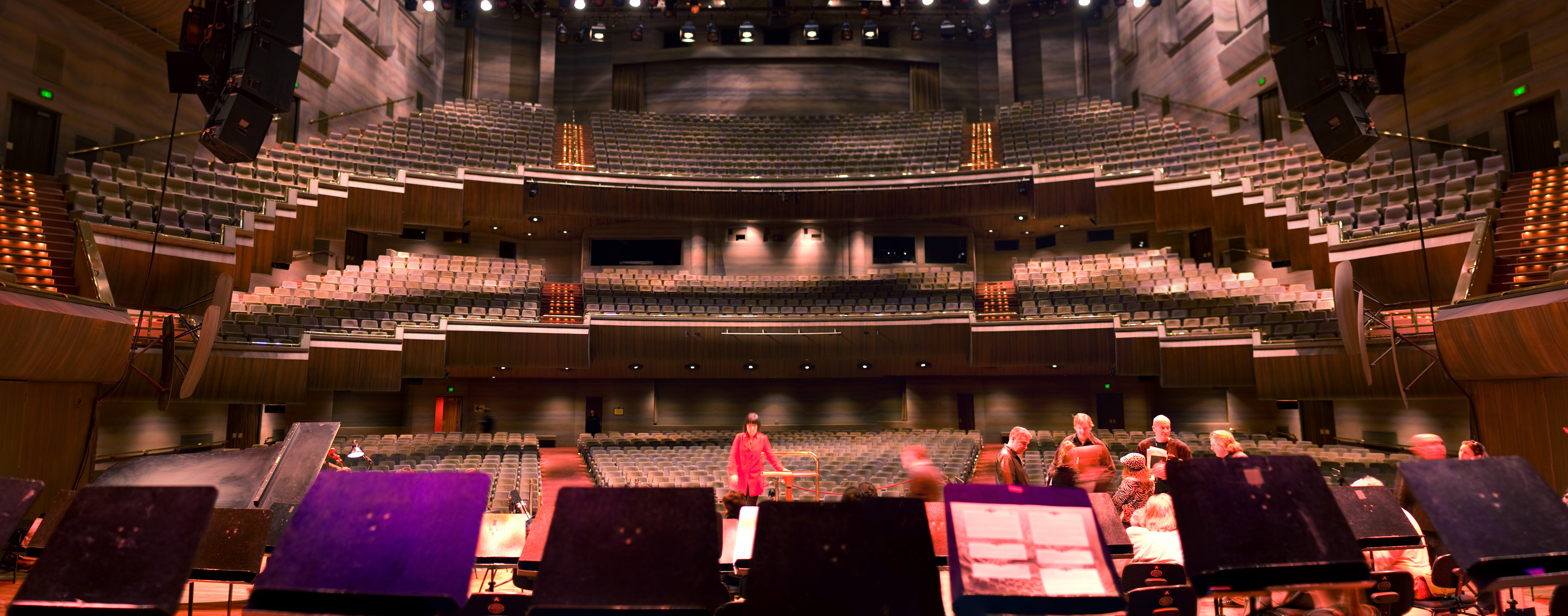
The MIFF Opening Night Gala regularly takes place in the Arts Centre Melbourne's Hamer Hall

MIFF's annual program boasts around 300 titles spanning feature films, short films and XR (virtual reality, augmented reality and mixed reality), alongside a suite of galas, special events, activations and talks. In 2022, the festival screened 260 features, 111 shorts, 12 XR works, and 10 galas and special events, representing 82 countries of origin and 75 languages.

== Film competitions ==
MIFF's short film competition, established in 1962, is accredited by the American Academy of Motion Picture Arts and Sciences, the British Academy of Film and Television Arts and the Australian Academy of Cinema and Television Arts. Its inaugural award was 'Best Short Film', but the title was changed to 'Grand Prix for Best Short Film' in 1965. Since 1985, the Grand Prix has been presented by the City of Melbourne.

In 2022, this was complemented by a feature-length competition for first- and second-time directors, the Bright Horizons Award (presented by VicScreen), whose winner receives a A$140,000 prize; as well as the Blackmagic Design Australian Innovation Award, which recognizes an outstanding Australian creative with a A$70,000 cash prize. As of 2023, the MIFF Awards slate has been expanded to also include the First Nations Film Creative Award, which recognizes an outstanding Indigenous Australian creative with a prize worth $45,000; the Audience Award, as decided by public voting; and the MIFF Schools Youth Jury Award, crowning the best title from the student-focused MIFF Schools program.

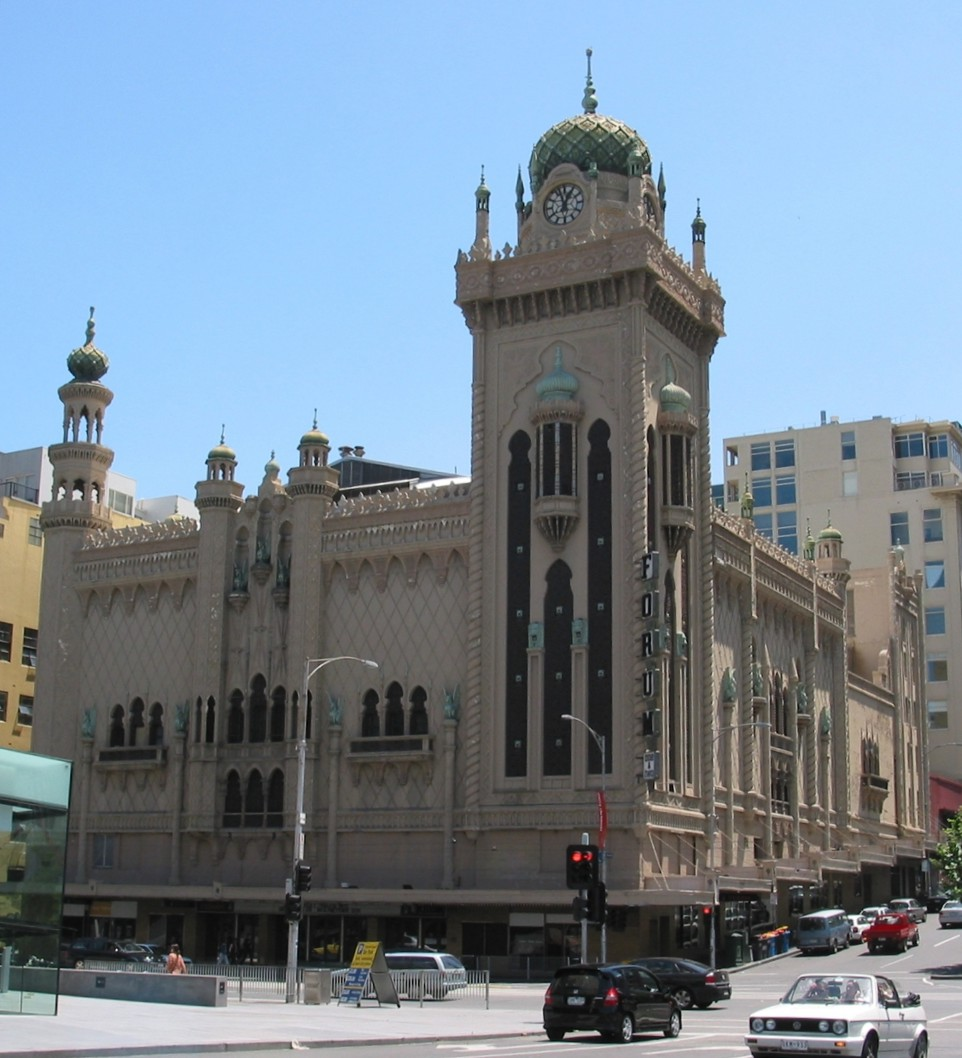
The Forum Theatre is a main venue for the short film competition, as well as festival panels and lectures

=== Feature film awards ===
- Bright Horizons Award
- Blackmagic Design Australian Innovation Award
- First Nations Film Creative Award
- Audience Award
- MIFF Schools Youth Jury Award

=== Bright Horizons Award ===
Introduced in 2022, the Bright Horizons Award presents a prize of A$140,000 in cash to a film judged as the best film in the Bright Horizons competition. It is the richest film prize in the southern hemisphere.

The winners have been:

Year	Film	Director	Country	Ref
2022	Neptune Frost	Saul Williams, Anisia Uzeyman	United States, Rwanda	
2023	Banel & Adama	Ramata-Toulaye Sy	France, Mali, Senegal	
2024	Universal Language	Matthew Rankin	Canada	
2025	A Poet	Simón Mesa Soto	Colombia, Germany, Sweden	
2026	La Gradiva	Marine Atlan	France, Italy	

=== Short film awards ===
In 2023 Campari was the Shorts Awards Presenting Partner, and the Venue Partner ACMI. The Shorts Awards are all accredited by Academy Awards, and the 2023 winners of the Best Short Film, Best Australian Short Film, Best Documentary Short Film, and Best Animation Short Film awards were eligible to submit their films for the 96th Academy Awards in 2024. The MIFF Shorts program is also BAFTA-Qualifying; any British film screened in the 2023 festival was eligible for entry in the British Short Film and British Short Animation categories of the 2024 BAFTA Film Awards. The 2023 awards were as follows:

- City of Melbourne Grand Prix for Best Short Film
- VicScreen Erwin Rado Award for Best Australian Short Film
- Award for Emerging Australian Filmmaker
- Award for Best Fiction Short Film
- Award for Best Documentary Short Film
- Award for Best Animation Short Film
- Award for Best Experimental Short Film

As of 2019 awards for short films were:

- City of Melbourne Grand Prix for Best Short Film – $7,000 cash prize (Academy-accredited Award)
- Melbourne Airport Award for Emerging Australian Filmmaker – $5,000 cash prize + airfare to Berlinale
- Film Victoria Erwin Rado Award for Best Australian Short Film – $5,000 cash prize
- Cinema Nova Award for Best Fiction Short Film – $3,000 cash prize (Academy-accredited Award)
- RMIT University Award for Best Animation Short Film – $3,000 cash prize (Academy-accredited Award)
- RMIT University Award for Best Documentary Short Film – $3,000 cash prize
- MIFF Award for Best Experimental Short Film – $3,000 cash prize (Academy-accredited Award)

=== Winners of Grand Prix for Best Short Film ===
Year	Film	Director	Country
1965	La gazza ladra	Giulio Giannini, Emanuele Luzzati	Italy
1966	The Inheritance	Harold Mayer	United States
1967	Petrol-Carburant-Kraftstoff	Hugo Niebeling	West Germany
1968	You're Human Like the Rest of Them	B. S. Johnson	UK
1969	Pas de deux	Norman McLaren	Canada
1970	Calcutta	Louis Malle	France
1971	Blake	Bill Mason	Canada
1972	Scarabus	Gérald Frydman	Belgium
1973	Street Musique	Ryan Larkin	Canada
1974	Edward Burra	Peter K. Smith	UK
1975	Last Grave at Dimbaza	Nana Mahamo	South Africa
1976	Leisure	Bruce Petty	Australia
1977	Corralejas de Sincelejo	Mario Mitrotti	Colombia
1978	Manimals	Robin Lehman	United States
1979	Malj	Aleksandar Ilic	Yugoslavia
1980	Interview	Caroline Leaf	Canada
1981	New York Story	Jackie Raynal	United States
1982	Shadows	Royden Irvine	Australia
1983	Douglas Mawson: The Survivor	David Parer	Australia
1984	Aquí se lo halla	Lee Sokol	United States
1985	In Heaven There Is No Beer?	Les Blank	United States
1986	My Life Without Steve	Gillian Leahy	Australia
1987	Panya shugeki	Naoto Yamakawa	Japan
1988	The Critical Years	Gerald L'Ecuyer	Canada/United States
1989	Twilight City	Reece Auguiste	UK
1990	Swimming	Belinda Chayko	Australia
1991	Sink or Swim	Su Friedrich	United States
1992	The Writing in the Sand	Sirkka-Liisa Konttinen	UK
1993	Lektionen in Finsternis	Werner Herzog	Germany
1994	Only the Brave	Ana Kokkinos	Australia
1995	Twilight	Tengai Amano	Japan
1996	Baka	Thierry Knauff	Belgium
1997	At Sea	Penny Fowler-Smith	Australia
1998	The Storekeeper	Gavin Hood	South Africa
1999	So-poong	Song Il-gon	South Korea
2000	Wildlife	Kate de Pury	UK
2001	Muakah	Hadar Friedlich	Israel
2002	Palace II	Kátia Lund, Fernando Meirelles	Brazil
2003	Destino	Dominique Monfery	France
2004	Talking with Angels	Yousaf Ali Khan	UK
2005	Silent Companion	Elham Hosseinzadeh	Iran
2006	Avatar	Lluis Quilez	Spain
2007	Blood Sisters	Louise N.D. Friedberg	Denmark
2008	Dennis	Mads Matthiesen	Denmark
2009	Next Floor	Denis Villeneuve, Phoebe Greenberg	Canada
2010	The Lost Thing	Shaun Tan, Andrew Ruhemann	Australia
2011	A Fine Young Man	Kevan Funk	Canada
2012	It's Not A Cowboy Movie	Benjamin Parent	France
2013	Pandas	Matúš Vizár	Czech Republic
2014	The Queen	Benjamin Parent	Argentina
2015	Everything Will Be OK	Patrick Vollrath	Germany
2016	Mrs Metro	Aggelos Papantoniou	Australia

== Controversies ==
=== Breakaway film festival (2000) ===
In 2000, MIFF's rejection of a feature film written and directed by Richard Wolstencroft led him to form the Melbourne Underground Film Festival (MUFF). In subsequent years, MUFF has attracted controversy by criticising the content of MIFF, as well as its management, specifically the leadership of former directors. MUFF sees itself as a space for exciting and edgy Australian cinema that may not be played at MIFF.

=== Looking for Eric (2009) ===
In June 2009, Ken Loach, Paul Laverty (writer) and Rebecca O'Brien (producer) pulled their film Looking for Eric from the festival because the Israeli Embassy was a sponsor and the festival declined to withdraw their sponsorship. Moore compared Loach's tactics to blackmail, stating that "we will not participate in a boycott against the State of Israel, just as we would not contemplate boycotting films from China or other nations involved in difficult long-standing historical disputes".

=== Uyghur film (2009) ===
During the 58th festival in 2009, the film The 10 Conditions of Love (2009), which documents the life of the exiled Uyghur leader Rebiya Kadeer, was screened despite many attempts by the Government of China to have the film withdrawn from the festival. Chinese filmmakers withdrew their films from the festival two days before it opened on 24 July 2009. Former MIFF director Richard Moore refused to remove the film from the festival program, despite the hacking of the festival website and attempts to hack its online ticketing system from IP addresses of Chinese origin. Later, both pro-Chinese and pro-Uyghur activists attempted to disrupt ticketing due to the media coverage. The Chinese Government contacted Robert Doyle, the Lord Mayor of Melbourne asking him to intervene, but he refused. Australia's Ambassador to China Geoff Raby was summoned by China's Deputy Foreign Minister Zhang Zhijun to express displeasure about Kadeer's attendance at MIFF.

Victoria Police was placed on alert during the screening of the film and Pro-Uighur demonstrators also gathered outside the Melbourne Town Hall, and the Dalai Lama sent a message of support via Michael Danby, the MP for Melbourne Ports:

== See also ==
- Film festival
- List of film festivals
- List of short film festivals
- St Kilda Short Film Festival
- Cinema of Australia
