= Huesca International Film Festival =

- Location: Huesca, Spain
- Founded: 1973
- Most recent: 2025
- Directors: José María Escriche (1973–2008); Estela Rasal (incumbent)
- Festival date: Opening: 6 June 2025; Closing: 14 June 2025
- Website: https://www.huesca-filmfestival.com/

Current: 53rd
- 54th 52nd

Huesca International Film Festival is a film festival in the Spanish city of Huesca, province of Aragon. The event is dedicated to short meter films. Established in 1973, as of 2024 it is a qualifying festival for the Goya and the Academy awards.

== History ==
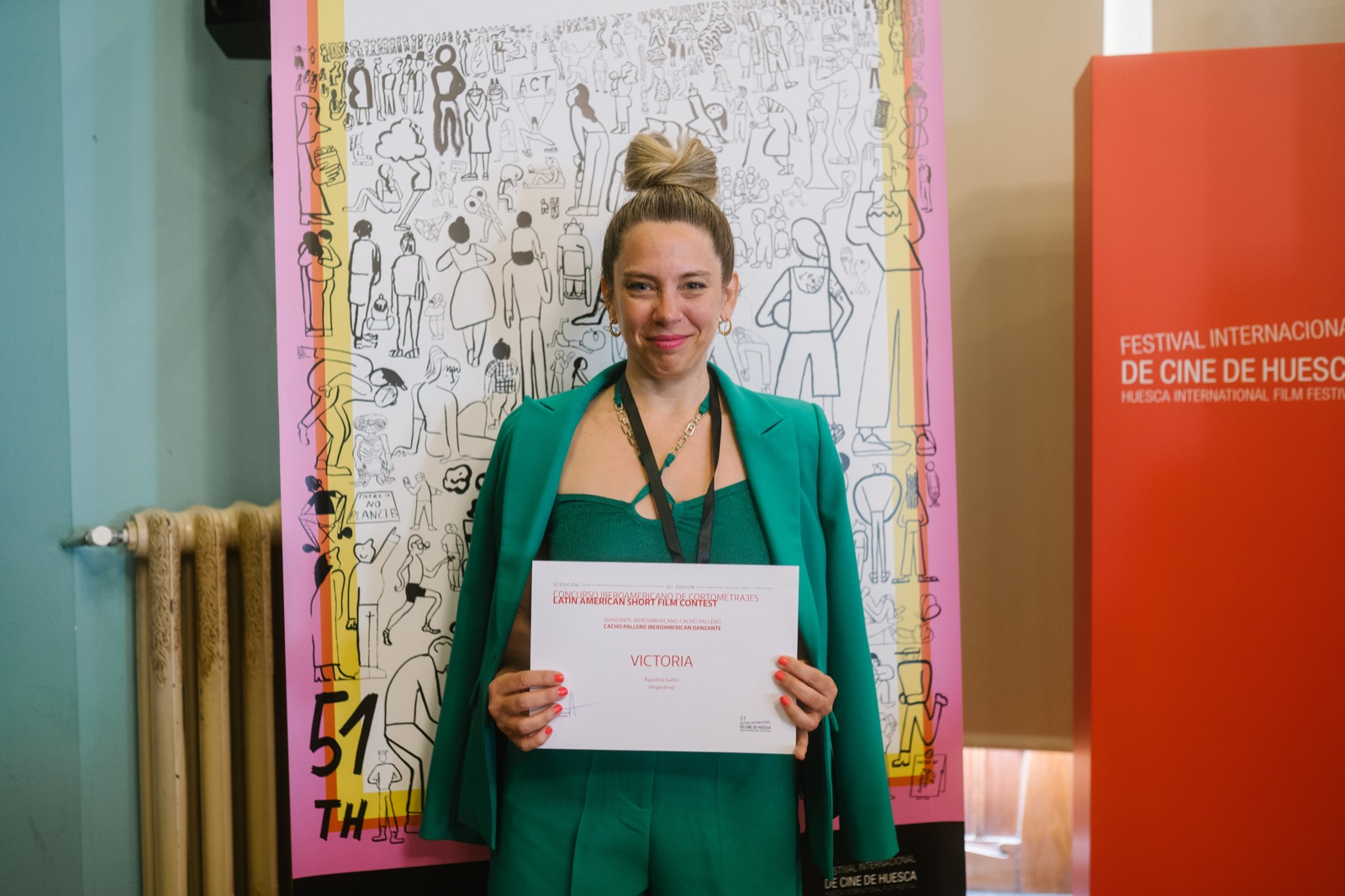
Agustina Gatto at the Huesca International Film Festival, 2023

Huesca International Film Festival was established in April 1973 as a project of Peña Recreativa Zoiti cinema club.

For more than 30 years, the festival was headed by José María Escriche who was driven by the idea to promote the short meter genre which is usually perceived as the ‘younger brother’ of full meter cinema. Escriche died in 2008, leaving as a legacy a festival that had grown from a small local initiative into a prestigious international gathering.

With time passing by, the festival demonstrated a constant growth. The 39th edition of the festival (3–11.06.2011) featured a program of 109 short films from 41 different countries, while the management received more than 1500 applications. The edition's prize fund exceeded €58.000. Every year the team receives more than 2000 applications. At the 52d edition in 2024, the program exceeded 50 scheduled events and attracted an audience 20% bigger compared to the previous year.

In 2022, Rubén Moreno stepped down as the event's director and was succeeded by Estela Rasal, previously head of the Pirineos Mountain Film Festival.

In 2022, to celebrated the 50th anniversary edition of the festival, one of its co-founders Ángel Garcés released a book Huesca de cine: 50 años del Festival Internacional de Cine de Huesca (Huesca in Cinema: 50 years of the Huesca International Film Festival), dedicated to the event and covering 50 years of its history.

The 52d edition of the festival was marked with an attendance of 166000 visitors and 4000 industry professionals.

== Profile ==
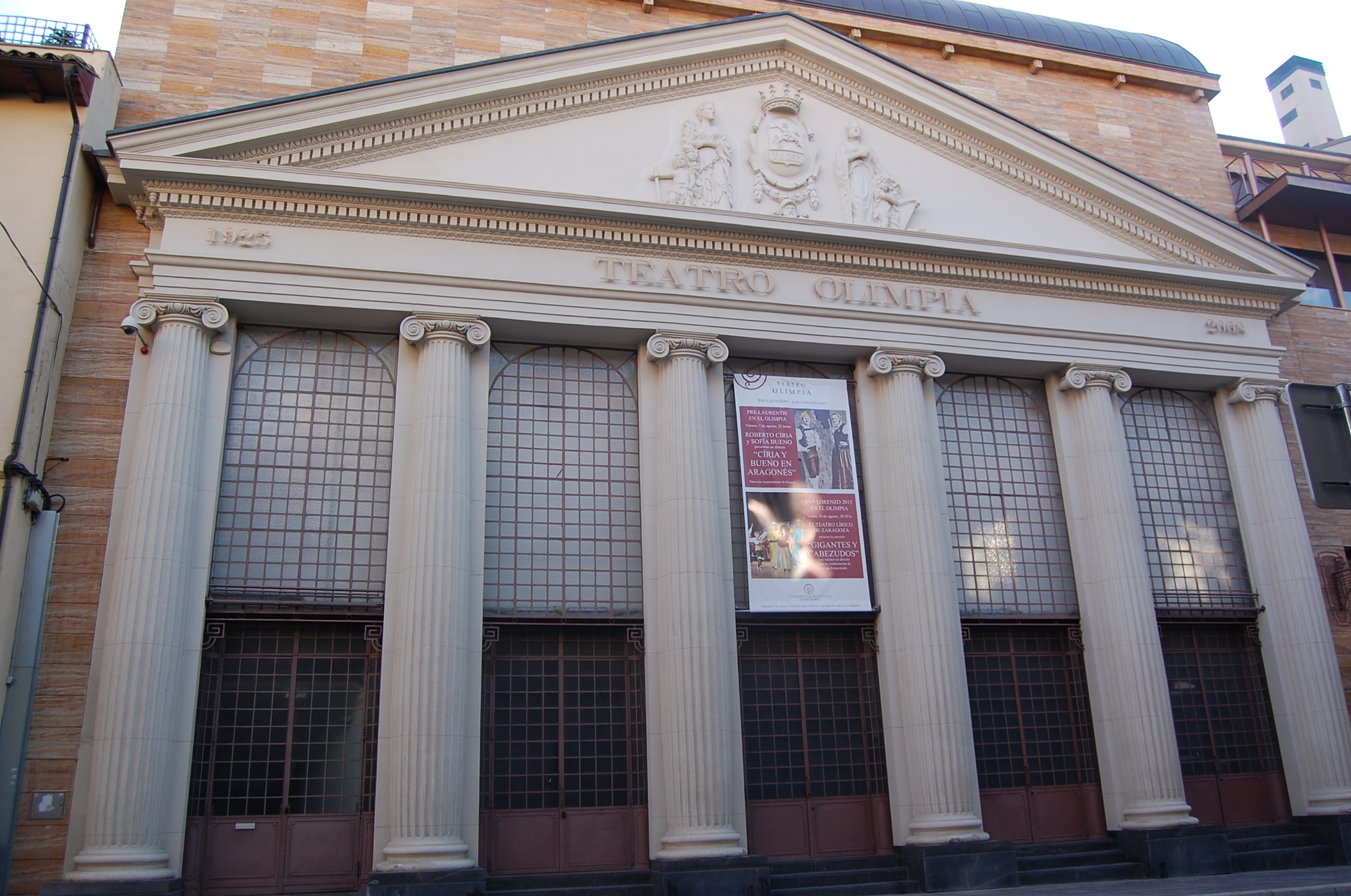
Teatro Olimpia, 2015

Huesca is a qualifying festival for the Goya and the Academy Awards.

Huesca Film Festival features three official competitions: the Latin-American, the Documentary and the International. The program also includes sections for special prizes 'Pepe Escriche' and 'City of Huesca'. Every year, more than 24000 euros are distributed in prizes.

The festival's main venue is Teatro Olimpia, however, its vast program includes numerous events in other locations. An initiative dedicated to the elderly people and persons with disabilities runs special sessions and covers all the city's facilities and residential centres. In 2018, the Youth Film Festival was inaugurated as a part of the Huesca fest, it selects works by first and second years students and judged by a jury composed of students. Every edition includes special events such as tributes to prominent auteurs, open talks, professional. In 2024, the festival launched an initiative ‘Cinema Festival in the Classes’ and carried out film screenings at numerous schools and universities.

The event is sponsored by several official bodies – the Government of Aragon, Provincial Council of Huesca, Huesca City Council, and independent associations Fundación Anselmo Pié, La Caixa, TUHUESCA, Renfe and the Aragonese Institute of Women.
