= Atsushi Wada =

Japanese animator

Atsushi Wada (和田淳, Wada Atsushi, born 1980) is a Japanese independent animator. Born in Hyōgo Prefecture, Japan, he is best known for the short film The Great Rabbit (2012), which won the Silver Bear (Jury Prize) for short films at the 62nd Berlin International Film Festival, and for directing the anime short series Ikimono-san (2023).

== Biography ==
Wada was born in 1980 in Hyōgo Prefecture. He began making animated films independently around 2002. He studied at Osaka Kyoiku University and the Japan Institute of the Moving Image, before entering the first cohort of the Animation course at the Graduate School of Film and New Media, Tokyo University of the Arts, from which he later graduated.

His 2010 graduation film, In a Pig's Eye (Wakaranai Buta), won the Excellence Award in the Animation Division at the Japan Media Arts Festival and the Best Film award at the Fantoche International Animation Film Festival. His following short, The Mechanism of Spring (Haru no Shikumi, 2010), premiered at the Venice Film Festival.

In 2012, Wada directed The Great Rabbit, a French-Japanese co-production between Sacrebleu Productions, CaRTe bLaNChe, and Wada himself. The film won the Silver Bear Jury Prize in the International Short Film competition at the 62nd Berlin International Film Festival.

In 2017, Wada contributed the segment "Fall" to the Four Seasons Animation Concert, a project supervised by Kōji Yamamura in which four international animators each created a short film inspired by a movement of Antonio Vivaldi's The Four Seasons; the resulting film, released as Autumn, from Vivaldi's The Four Seasons, won the Japan Grand Prix at the New Chitose Airport International Animation Festival.

His 2022 short film Bird in the Peninsula, a French-Japanese co-production with Miyu Productions and New Deer, premiered at the 72nd Berlin International Film Festival, where it received a special mention from the International Short Film Jury. The film went on to win the Grand Prize for Short Animation at the 46th Ottawa International Animation Festival later that year. In 2023, Wada directed Ikimono-san, a series of 90-second anime shorts produced by New Deer and distributed by Toei Animation, which competed in the Grand Competition Short Film category at Animafest Zagreb. The series earned Wada the Newcomer Award in the Media Arts category at the 2024 Agency for Cultural Affairs' Media Arts Awards.

== Style ==
Wada's films are characterized by understated, muted pencil-line drawings, and a focus on the traditional Japanese concept of "ma" (間, pause/interval) and the quality of movement.

== Filmography ==
- Day of Nose (鼻の日, Hanabi no Hi, 2005) — Won the Grand Prize at the Norwich International Animation Festival.
- Well, That's Glasses (そういう眼鏡, Sōiu Megane, 2007) — Won the Best Young Jury Prize at the Rio de Janeiro International Short Film Festival.
- In a Pig's Eye (わからないブタ, Wakaranai Buta, 2010) — Won the Excellence Award in the Animation Division at the Japan Media Arts Festival and the Best Film award at the Fantoche International Animation Film Festival.
- The Mechanism of Spring (春のしくみ, Haru no Shikumi, 2010) — Premiered at the Venice Film Festival.
- The Great Rabbit (グレートラビット, Gurēto Rabitto, 2012) — Won the Silver Bear Jury Prize at the 62nd Berlin International Film Festival.
- Anomalies (2013)
- Autumn, from Vivaldi's The Four Seasons (秋 アントニオ・ヴィヴァルディ「四季」より, Aki: Antonio Vivaldi "Shiki" yori, 2017) — Won the Japan Grand Prix at the New Chitose Airport International Animation Festival.
- Bird in the Peninsula (2022) — Received a special mention from the International Short Film Jury at the 72nd Berlin International Film Festival and won the Grand Prize for Short Animation at the 46th Ottawa International Animation Festival.
- Ikimono-san (2023, TV/web anime short series) — Won the Newcomer Award in the Media Arts category at the 2024 Agency for Cultural Affairs' Media Arts Awards.
