= Ottawa International Animation Festival =

Annual animated film and media festival in Ottawa, Ontario, Canada

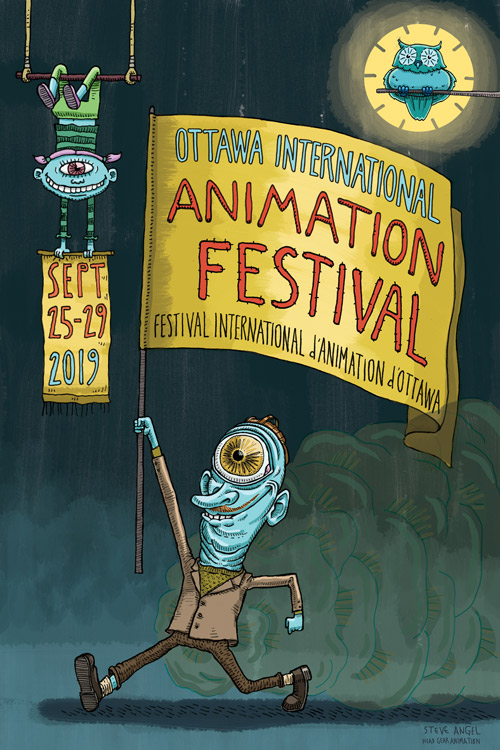
- The poster for OIAF 2019. Design by Steve Angel.
- Status: Active
- Genre: Film festival
- Frequency: Annually
- Locations: Ottawa, Ontario
- Country: Canada
- Inaugurated: 1975
- Most recent: September 2026
- Next event: September 2027
- Website: Ottawa International Animation Festival

The Ottawa International Animation Festival is an annual animated film and media festival that takes place in Ottawa, Ontario, Canada. The OIAF was founded in 1975, with the first festival held from August 10 to 15 in 1976. Initially organized by the Canadian Film Institute on a biennial basis and with the co-operation of the International Animated Film Association, the Festival organization now remains in the hands of the CFI. It moved from a biennial to an annual festival in 2005. Today the festival is recognized as the largest and oldest animation festival in North America, and regularly attracts upwards of 25,000 attendees when it is held each September.

== History ==
The Ottawa International Animation Festival was founded in 1975 by various figures in the world of Canadian animation, most prominently Bill Kuhns, Frederik Manter, Prescott J. Wright, Frank Taylor, and Kelly O'Brien. Many Canadian film and media institutions, such as the National Film Board of Canada, Télévision de Radio-Canada, CBC Television, and Cinémathèque Québécoise also played a fundamental role in building the festival into its present state.

Canada's national capital Ottawa was chosen as the host city due to its already strong film culture, being the former home of the NFB as well as many of Canada's first animation studios. Additionally, Ottawa was (at the time) home of famed Canadian animator and filmmaker Norman McLaren, who went on to be recognized for his contributions to the field of animation by the festival as its first honorary president. The festival was originally led by Wayne Clarkson, until he left in 1978 to become artistic director of the Festival of Festivals.

The OIAF experienced a brief change of location in 1984 when it was moved to Toronto and subsequently to Hamilton, Ontario in 1986 before settling back in Ottawa in 1990, where it has remained since. In 1999 the festival office suffered a fire, leading to many of the files from past years being lost. Nevertheless, the festival has continued to thrive. In 1997 the Ottawa International Student Animation Festival (SAFO) was founded and held in alternate years to the larger OIAF. In 2005 the OIAF moved from biennial to annual and as such the student categories became part of the main festival.

In 2002 the festival premiered its business conference component, originally called the Television Animation Conference and now known simply as The Animation Conference or TAC. The Animation conference runs concurrently with the festival and is aimed more at industry professionals than the general public, providing those in the animation industry an opportunity to network with their colleagues.

Today the OIAF continues to grow and is known in the festival world for its practice of pitting both commercial and independent projects in competition with one another, a strategy which leads to a wide breadth of styles and formats. The OIAF features traditionally-drawn animated films, animation made with computer graphics, and more recently, even projects made in virtual reality.

== Grand prize winners ==
Year	Best Feature	Best Short	Ref
1976	--	The Street - Caroline Leaf (Canada)	
1978	--	Rowing Across the Atlantic - Jean-François Laguionie (France)	
1980	--	Ubu - Geoff Dunbar (UK)	
1982	--	Crac - Frederic Back (Canada)	
1984	--	Chips - Jerzy Kucia (Poland)	
1986	--	The Frog, the Dog and the Devil - Bob Stenhouse (New Zealand)	
1988	--	The Man Who Planted Trees - Frederic Back (Canada)	
1990	--	Hen, His Wife - Igor Kovalyov (USSR)	
1992	--	Two Sisters - Caroline Leaf (Canada)	
1994	--	The Wrong Trousers - Nick Park (UK)	
1996	--	Bird in the Window - Igor Kovalyov (Russia/USA)	
1997	--	We Lived in Grass - Andreas Hykade (Germany)	
1998	--	The Night of the Carrots - Priit Pärn (Estonia)	
1999	--	Grace - Lorelei Pepi (USA)	
2000	--	Ring of Fire - Andreas Hykade (Germany)	
2001	--	Dog - Suzie Templeton (UK)	
2002	Waking Life - Richard Linklater (USA)	Home Road Movies - Robert Bradbrook (UK)	
2003	--	Son of Satan - Jean-Jacques-Villard (USA)	
2004	Raining Cats and Frogs - Jacques-Rémy Girerd (France)	Ryan - Chris Landreth (Canada)	
2005	The District! - Aron Gauder (Hungary)	Milch - Igor Kovalyov (USA)	
2006	The Christies - Phil Mulloy (UK)	Dreams & Desires: Family Ties - Joanna Quinn (UK)	
2007	Persepolis - Marjane Satrapi (France)	A Country Doctor - Koji Yamamura (Japan)	
2008	Terra - Aristomenis Tsirbas (USA)	Chainsaw - Dennis Tupicoff (Australia)	
2009	Mary and Max - Adam Elliot (Australia)	Kaasündinud Kohustused (Inherent Obligations) - Rao Heidmets, Estonia	
2010	Goodbye Mister Christie - Phil Mulloy (UK)	The External World - David O'Reilly (Ireland)	
2011	Dead but not Buried - Phil Mulloy (UK)	Moxie - Stephen Irwin (UK)	
2012	Wrinkles - Ignacio Ferreras (Spain)	Junkyard - Hisko Hulsing, (Netherlands)	
2013	Tito on Ice - Max Andersson (Germany/Sweden)	Lonely Bones - Rosto, (France/Netherlands)	
2014	Seth's Dominion - Luc Chamberland, (Canada)	Hippos (Hipopotamy) - Piotr Dumala, (Poland)	
2015	Over the Garden Wall - Patrick McHale, (USA/South Korea)	Small People With Hats - Sarina Nihei, (UK)	
2016	Louise by the Shore (Louise en Hiver) - Jean-François Laguionie (France/Canada)	I Like Girls (J'aime les filles) - Diane Obomsawin (Canada)	
2017	The Night Is Short, Walk on Girl - Masaaki Yuasa (Japan)	Ugly - Nikita Diakur (Germany)	
2018	This Magnificent Cake! (Ce magnifique gâteau !) - Emma de Swaef, Marc James Roels (Belgium)	Solar Walk - Réka Bucsi (Denmark/Hungary)	
2019	On-Gaku: Our Sound - Kenji Iwaisawa (Japan)	Don't Know What - Thomas Renoldner (Austria)	
2020	Kill It and Leave This Town - Mariusz Wilczynski (Poland)	KKUM - Kang-min Kim (South Korea/USA)	
2021	Bob Spit: We Do Not Like People - Cesar Cabral (Brazil)	Honekami (A Bite of Bone) - Honami Yano (Japan)	
2022	Dozens of Norths - Koji Yamamura (France)	Bird in the Peninsula - Atsushi Wada (France)	
2023	When Adam Changes (Adam change lentement) - Joël Vaudreuil (Canada)	Miserable Miracle - Ryo Orikasa (Canada/France/Japan)	
2024	Flow - Gints Zilbalodis (Belgium/France/Latvia)	La Voix des Sirènes - Gianluigi Toccafondo (France/Italy)	
2025	Death Does Not Exist (La mort n'existe pas) - Félix Dufour-Laperrière (Canada)	The Puppet and the Whale (Il burattino e la balena) - Roberto Catani (Italy)	

== Venues ==
The following venues host events and screenings during the Ottawa International Animation Festival:

- Ottawa Arts Court
- SAW Video
- SAW Gallery
- Ottawa Art Gallery
- National Gallery of Canada
- ByTowne Cinema
- Strathcona Park
- Pub 101
- Château Laurier
- National Arts Centre
