= Sand animation =

Manipulation of sand to create animation

A Ukrainian film, Кіт та півнек (Cat and Rooster), created by recording a live performance of sand being manipulated on glass.

Sand animation is a form of stop motion that manipulates images formed with sand under a camera to create animation. A sand animator will make incremental changes in the sand, taking one frame with each change to create a sequence of movement. Sand animation can also refer to a performance in which an artist tells a story through a series of images drawn with their hands in real time using sand, usually projected through a live camera feed and accompanied by music. A sand animator will often use the aid of an overhead projector or lightbox (similar to one used by photographers to view translucent films) to illuminate the sand from behind, manipulating the light coming through the sand to create shading and lines.

This style is particularly well-suited to animating silhouettes, and changing the coarseness or density of the sand can be used to create effects depicting smoke or clouds.

== History ==
Sand art has been made since antiquity, by several cultures, including Navajo, Aboriginal Australians and Tibetans. The Japanese art of Bonseki has been practiced since at the latest, the 7th century. This did not go beyond still images however, due to technical limitations.

One of the first documented uses of sand in animation can be seen in the special effects in Lotte Reiniger's film The Adventures of Prince Achmed. While Reiniger is known for her animated silhouette cutouts, she employed Walter Ruttmann on the film to create magical effects with sand and wax underneath her cut-outs.

Using sand as a primary material for animated films was adopted in the 1960s by Swiss animators Gisèle and Nag Ansorge and American animator Caroline Leaf. The Ansorges were running a small commercial film studio near Lausanne, Switzerland and used ground and dyed quartz sand to illustrate the circulating blood in a film about heart disease. They then adopted sand as their primary creative material, premiered their first complete film in the medium "Les corbeaux" ("The Ravens") in Annecy, 1967, and continued to work with sand until Gisèle's death in 1993.

Caroline Leaf is credited as one of the first sand animators, and began using sand for animation when she was an undergraduate art student at Harvard University in 1968. She created her first film, Sand, or Peter and the Wolf (1968), by dumping beach sand on a light box and manipulating the grains to build figures, textures and movement, frame by frame. In the 1970s, Eli Noyes, another Harvard graduate, created the short film Sandman (1973) and the Sand Alphabet (1974), which became a feature on the children's educational television program Sesame Street. About the same time Misseri Studio located in Italy produced the A.E.I.O.U. series, which was drawn in wet sand. In 1977, The Sand Castle by Dutch-Canadian animator Co Hoedeman won the Academy Award for Best Animated Short Film. Corrie Francis Parks used colored gels as background elements in the film Tracks (2003) to introduce vibrant color in what is usually a black and white medium. In 2006, Gert van der Vijver created the series De Zandtovenaar (The Sand Magician) on Dutch national television and since then, animates for the yearly outdoor play The Passion.

Around this time, sand animation began to gain popularity as an art form in Ukraine, with Kseniya Simonova beginning to do live sand performances in the late 2000s, and Oksana Merhut (known as the "sand fairy"), who has made sand animations about her home country, and wrote the first professional teaching programme in 2014.

=== Notable sand animations ===
- The Owl Who Married a Goose: An Eskimo Legend - Caroline Leaf - 1974
- Sabbat - Nag and Gisèle Ansorge - 1991
- The Sand Castle - Co Hoedeman - 1977
- Sandman - Eli Noyes - 1973

== Notable artists ==
- Ferenc Cakó
- Su Dabao
- Svetlana Telbukh
- Co Hoedeman
- Alexandra Konofalskaya
- Caroline Leaf
- Eli Noyes
- Kseniya Simonova
- Ilana Yahav
