= Canadian Screen Award for Best Animated Short =

Award for Canadian animated shorts

- Country: Canada
- Presented by: Academy of Canadian Cinema & Television
- First award: 1968
- Currently held by: The Girl Who Cried Pearls (2025)
- Website: academy.ca/awards

The Canadian Screen Award for Best Animated Short is awarded by the Academy of Canadian Cinema and Television to the best Canadian animated short film. Formerly part of the Genie Awards, since 2012 it has been presented as part of the Canadian Screen Awards.

== Best Theatrical Short Film ==
In the 1980s and 1990s, the award was not always presented at every Genie Award ceremony. In years when the award for animated shorts was not presented, a single award was instead presented for Best Theatrical Short Film, inclusive of both animated and live-action shorts.

Under current Academy regulations, the awards for live action and animated shorts can be collapsed into a single award if either category receives two or fewer eligible submissions, but remain separate if both categories surpass two submissions.

== 1960s ==
Year	Film	Nominees	Ref
1968; 20th Canadian Film Awards
1968; 20th Canadian Film Awards	A Child in His Country (Un enfant... un pays) (honourable mention only)	Pierre Moretti	
1969; 21st Canadian Film Awards
1969; 21st Canadian Film Awards	Walking	Ryan Larkin	

== 1970s ==
Year	Film	Nominees	Ref
1970; 22nd Canadian Film Awards
1970; 22nd Canadian Film Awards	To See or Not to See (Psychocratie)	Bretislav Pojar	
1971; 23rd Canadian Film Awards
1971; 23rd Canadian Film Awards	Evolution	Michael Mills	
1972; 24th Canadian Film Awards
1972; 24th Canadian Film Awards	Dans la vie...	Pierre Veilleux	
1973; 25th Canadian Film Awards
1973; 25th Canadian Film Awards	The Family That Dwelt Apart	Yvon Mallette	
1974
1974	No award presented		
1975; 26th Canadian Film Awards
1975; 26th Canadian Film Awards	The Owl Who Married a Goose	Caroline Leaf	
1976; 27th Canadian Film Awards
1976; 27th Canadian Film Awards	The Street	Caroline Leaf	
1977; 28th Canadian Film Awards
1977; 28th Canadian Film Awards	Spinnolio	John Weldon	
1977; 28th Canadian Film Awards	Bead Game	Ishu Patel	
1977; 28th Canadian Film Awards	A Cosmic Christmas	Clive A. Smith, Michael Hirsh, Patrick Loubert	
1977; 28th Canadian Film Awards	Symbiosis	David Cox	
1978; 29th Canadian Film Awards
1978; 29th Canadian Film Awards	Afterlife	Ishu Patel	
1978; 29th Canadian Film Awards	Blowhard	Brad Caslor, Christopher Hinton	
1978; 29th Canadian Film Awards	The Devil and Daniel Mouse	Clive A. Smith	
1978; 29th Canadian Film Awards	Harness the Wind	Sidney Goldsmith	

== 1980s ==
Year	Film	Filmmakers	Ref
1980; 1st Genie Awards
1980; 1st Genie Awards	Every Child	Eugene Fedorenko	
1980; 1st Genie Awards	Caninabis	Kaj Pindal	
1980; 1st Genie Awards	Tukiki and His Search for a Merry Christmas	W.H. Stevens Jr., Beryl Friesen	
1981; 2nd Genie Awards
1981; 2nd Genie Awards	No award presented; see Genie Award for Best Theatrical Short Film.		
1982; 3rd Genie Awards
1982; 3rd Genie Awards	No award presented; see Genie Award for Best Theatrical Short Film.		
1983; 4th Genie Awards
1983; 4th Genie Awards	No award presented; see Genie Award for Best Theatrical Short Film.		
1984; 5th Genie Awards
1984; 5th Genie Awards	No award presented; see Genie Award for Best Theatrical Short Film.		
1985; 6th Genie Awards
1985; 6th Genie Awards	No award presented; see Genie Award for Best Theatrical Short Film.		
1986; 7th Genie Awards
1986; 7th Genie Awards	The Big Snit	Michael Scott, Richard Condie	
1986; 7th Genie Awards	Paradise (Paradis)	Ishu Patel	
1986; 7th Genie Awards	Sylvia	Yves Leduc	
1987; 8th Genie Awards
1987; 8th Genie Awards	Get a Job	Brad Caslor, Michael Scott, Derek Mazur	
1987; 8th Genie Awards	Every Dog's Guide to Complete Home Safety	Bill Pettigrew, Les Drew	
1987; 8th Genie Awards	Tables of Content	Wendy Tilby	
1988; 9th Genie Awards
1988; 9th Genie Awards	No award presented; see Genie Award for Best Theatrical Short Film.		
1989; 10th Genie Awards
1989; 10th Genie Awards	The Cat Came Back	Richard Condie, Cordell Barker	
1989; 10th Genie Awards	Nocturnes	Yves Leduc	
1989; 10th Genie Awards	Primiti Too Taa	Ed Ackerman	

== 1990s ==
Year	Film	Filmmakers	Ref
1990; 11th Genie Awards
1990; 11th Genie Awards	Juke-Bar	Martin Barry	
1990; 11th Genie Awards	In and Out	David Fine, Alison Snowden	
1990; 11th Genie Awards	The Dingles	Bill Pettigrew	
1991; 12th Genie Awards
1991; 12th Genie Awards	No award presented; see Genie Award for Best Theatrical Short Film.		
1992; 13th Genie Awards
1992; 13th Genie Awards	Strings	Wendy Tilby	
1992; 13th Genie Awards	Blackfly	Christopher Hinton	
1992; 13th Genie Awards	The Lump	John Weldon	
1993; 14th Genie Awards
1993; 14th Genie Awards	Pearl's Diner	Lynn Smith	
1993; 14th Genie Awards	No Problem	Craig Welch	
1994; 15th Genie Awards
1994; 15th Genie Awards	No award presented; see Genie Award for Best Theatrical Short Film.		
1995; 16th Genie Awards
1995; 16th Genie Awards	No award presented; see Genie Award for Best Theatrical Short Film.		
1996; 17th Genie Awards
1996; 17th Genie Awards	No award presented; see Genie Award for Best Theatrical Short Film.		
1997; 18th Genie Awards
1997; 18th Genie Awards	The Old Lady and the Pigeons (La vieille dame et les pigeons)	Sylvain Chomet, Bernard Lajoie, Didier Brunner	
1997; 18th Genie Awards	Dinner for Two	Barrie Angus McLean, Janet Perlman	
1997; 18th Genie Awards	Under the Weather (À l'ombre)	Tali Prévost, Yves Leduc, Pierre Hébert	
1998; 19th Genie Awards
1998; 19th Genie Awards	Bingo	Andy Jones, Kevin Tureski, Chris Landreth	
1998; 19th Genie Awards	Frank the Wrabbit	Marcy Page, John Weldon	
1999; 20th Genie Awards
1999; 20th Genie Awards	When the Day Breaks	Wendy Tilby, Amanda Forbis, David Verrall	
1999; 20th Genie Awards	Ludovic: The Snow Gift	Co Hoedeman, Thérèse Descary	
1999; 20th Genie Awards	The Old Man and the Sea	Alexander Petrov, Bernard Lajoie, Tatsuo Shimamura	

== 2000s ==
Year	Film	Filmmakers	Ref
2000; 21st Genie Awards
2000; 21st Genie Awards	Village of Idiots	Rose Newlove, Michael Scott, David Verrall, Eugene Fedorenko	
2000; 21st Genie Awards	Cuckoo, Mr. Edgar! (Coucou, Monsieur Edgar!)	Pierre M. Trudeau, Thérèse Descary	
2000; 21st Genie Awards	From the Big Bang to Tuesday Morning (Du big bang à mardi matin)	Thérèse Descary, Jean-Jacques Leduc, Claude Cloutier, Marcel Jean	
2001; 22nd Genie Awards
2001; 22nd Genie Awards	The Boy Who Saw the Iceberg	Marcy Page, Paul Driessen	
2001; 22nd Genie Awards	Aria	Pjotr Sapegin, Marcel Jean, David Reiss-Andersen	
2001; 22nd Genie Awards	Strange Invaders	Jennifer Torrance, Cordell Barker	
2002; 23rd Genie Awards
2002; 23rd Genie Awards	The Hungry Squid	Marcy Page, John Weldon	
2002; 23rd Genie Awards	Glasses	Marcy Page, Brian Duchscherer	
2002; 23rd Genie Awards	Pirouette	Marcel Jean, Tali Prévost, Pierre Hébert	
2003; 24th Genie Awards
2003; 24th Genie Awards	Falling in Love Again	Munro Ferguson, Marcy Page	
2003; 24th Genie Awards	Islet (Îlot)	Nicolas Brault, Michèle Bélanger	
2003; 24th Genie Awards	Stormy Night (Nuit d'orage)	Michèle Lemieux, Jean-Jacques Leduc, Marcel Jean	
2004; 25th Genie Awards
2004; 25th Genie Awards	Ryan	Marcy Page, Steven Hoban, Mark Smith, Chris Landreth	
2004; 25th Genie Awards	Louise	Jennifer Torrance, Michael Scott, Anita Lebeau	
2004; 25th Genie Awards	Mabel's Saga	JoDee Samuelson, Kent Martin	
2004; 25th Genie Awards	The Man with No Shadow (L'Homme sans ombre)	Georges Schwizgebel, Marcel Jean	
2004; 25th Genie Awards	Through My Thick Glasses	Pjotr Sapegin, Marcel Jean, David Reiss-Andersen	
2005; 26th Genie Awards
2005; 26th Genie Awards	cNote	Michael Fukushima, Christopher Hinton	
2005; 26th Genie Awards	Dehors novembre	Patrick Bouchard, Michèle Bélanger	
2005; 26th Genie Awards	Ruzz and Ben (Ruzz et Ben)	Philippe Jullien, Jean-Pierre Lemouland, Marcel Jean	
2006; 27th Genie Awards
2006; 27th Genie Awards	The Danish Poet	Torill Kove, Lise Fearnley, Marcy Page	
2006; 27th Genie Awards	Tragic Story with Happy Ending (Histoire tragique avec fin heureuse)	Regina Pessoa, Patrick Eveno, Abi Feijò, Jacques-Rémy Girerd, Marcel Jean	
2007; 28th Genie Awards
2007; 28th Genie Awards	Madame Tutli-Putli	Maciek Szczerbowski, Chris Lavis, Marcy Page	
2007; 28th Genie Awards	Here and There (Ici par ici)	Marc Bertrand, Diane Obomsawin	
2007; 28th Genie Awards	Jeu	Marcel Jean, Michèle Bélanger, Georges Schwizgebel	
2008; 29th Genie Awards
2008; 29th Genie Awards	Sleeping Betty (Isabelle au bois dormant)	Claude Cloutier, Marcel Jean	
2008; 29th Genie Awards	Drux Flux	Theodore Ushev, Marc Bertrand	
2008; 29th Genie Awards	The Facts in the Case of Mister Hollow	Rodrigo Gudiño, Vincent Marcone, Marco Pecota	
2009; 30th Genie Awards
2009; 30th Genie Awards	Runaway	Derek Mazur, Cordell Barker, Michael Scott	
2009; 30th Genie Awards	The Spine	Steven Hoban, Chris Landreth, Marcy Page	
2009; 30th Genie Awards	Vive la rose	Michael Fukushima, Bruce Alcock, Annette Clarke, Tina Ouellette	

== 2010s ==
Year	Film	Filmmakers	Ref
2010; 31st Genie Awards
2010; 31st Genie Awards	Lipsett Diaries	Theodore Ushev, Marc Bertrand	
2010; 31st Genie Awards	The Trenches (La Tranchée)	Claude Cloutier, Marc Bertrand	
2011; 32nd Genie Awards
2011; 32nd Genie Awards	Romance	Georges Schwizgebel, René Chénier, Marc Bertrand	
2011; 32nd Genie Awards	Choke	Michelle Latimer	
2011; 32nd Genie Awards	Inner City (La Cité entre les murs)	Alain Fournier	
2011; 32nd Genie Awards	Muybridge's Strings	Kōji Yamamura, Michael Fukushima, Shuzo John Shiota, Keisuke Tsuchihashi	
2011; 32nd Genie Awards	Wild Life	Amanda Forbis, Wendy Tilby, Marcy Page, Bonnie Thompson	
2012; 1st Canadian Screen Awards
2012; 1st Canadian Screen Awards	Paula	Julie Roy, Dominic Étienne Simard	
2012; 1st Canadian Screen Awards	Bydlo	Julie Roy, Patrick Bouchard	
2012; 1st Canadian Screen Awards	Demoni	Theodore Ushev	
2012; 1st Canadian Screen Awards	Edmond Was a Donkey (Edmond était un âne)	Richard Van den Boom, Franck Dion, Julie Roy	
2013; 2nd Canadian Screen Awards
2013; 2nd Canadian Screen Awards	Subconscious Password	Chris Landreth, Marcy Page, Mark Smith	
2013; 2nd Canadian Screen Awards	Impromptu	Bruce Alcock, Annette Clarke, Michael Fukushima, Tina Ouellette	
2013; 2nd Canadian Screen Awards	The End of Pinky	Claire Blanchet, Michael Fukushima	
2013; 2nd Canadian Screen Awards	Hollow Land	Michelle Kranot, Uri Kranot, Dora Benousilio, Marc Bertrand, Marie Bro	
2013; 2nd Canadian Screen Awards	Gloria Victoria	Theodore Ushev, Marc Bertrand	
2014; 3rd Canadian Screen Awards
2014; 3rd Canadian Screen Awards	Me and My Moulton	Lise Fearnley, Torill Kove, Marcy Page	
2014; 3rd Canadian Screen Awards	Day 40	Sol Friedman	
2014; 3rd Canadian Screen Awards	Improvisation no.1: Cumulative Loops	Luigi Allemano	
2014; 3rd Canadian Screen Awards	Migration	Mark Lomond, Johanne Ste-Marie	
2014; 3rd Canadian Screen Awards	Soif	René Chénier, Michèle Cournoyer, Galilé Marion-Gauvin, Marcel Jean	
2015; 4th Canadian Screen Awards
2015; 4th Canadian Screen Awards	The Ballad of Immortal Joe	Hector Herrera, Pazit Cahlon	
2015; 4th Canadian Screen Awards	Carface (Autos Portraits)	Claude Cloutier, Julie Roy	
2015; 4th Canadian Screen Awards	BAM	Howie Shia, Michael Fukushima, Maral Mohammadian	
2015; 4th Canadian Screen Awards	In Deep Waters (Dans les eaux profondes)	Sarah Van den Boom, Julie Roy, Richard Van den Boom	
2015; 4th Canadian Screen Awards	The Sleepwalker (Sonámbulo)	Theodore Ushev	
2016; 5th Canadian Screen Awards
2016; 5th Canadian Screen Awards	Blind Vaysha	Theodore Ushev, Marc Bertrand	
2016; 5th Canadian Screen Awards	I Am Here	Eoin Duffy, Maral Mohammadian, Shirley Vercruysse	
2016; 5th Canadian Screen Awards	I Like Girls (J'aime les filles)	Diane Obomsawin, Marc Bertrand	
2016; 5th Canadian Screen Awards	Mamie	Janice Nadeau, Marc Bertrand, Corinne Destombes	
2016; 5th Canadian Screen Awards	Red of the Yew Tree (If ou le rouge perdu)	Marie-Hélène Turcotte, Félix Dufour-Laperrière	
2017; 6th Canadian Screen Awards
2017; 6th Canadian Screen Awards	The Tesla World Light	Matthew Rankin, Julie Roy	
2017; 6th Canadian Screen Awards	Dam! The Story of Kit the Beaver	Kjell Boersma, Josh Clavir	
2017; 6th Canadian Screen Awards	Fox and the Whale	Robin Joseph	
2017; 6th Canadian Screen Awards	Hedgehog's Home	Eva Cvijanović, Vanja Andrijević, Jelena Popović	
2017; 6th Canadian Screen Awards	Manivald	Chintis Lundgren, Draško Ivezić, Jelena Popović	
2018; 7th Canadian Screen Awards
2018; 7th Canadian Screen Awards	Animal Behaviour	Alison Snowden, David Fine, Michael Fukushima	
2018; 7th Canadian Screen Awards	Biidaaban (The Dawn Comes)	Amanda Strong	
2018; 7th Canadian Screen Awards	Caterpillarplasty	David Barlow-Krelina, Jelena Popović	
2018; 7th Canadian Screen Awards	The Subject (Le sujet)	Patrick Bouchard, Julie Roy	
2018; 7th Canadian Screen Awards	A Visit (Une visite)	Parissa Mohit	
2019; 8th Canadian Screen Awards
2019; 8th Canadian Screen Awards	Giant Bear	Neil Christopher, Daniel Gies, Emily Paige	
2019; 8th Canadian Screen Awards	Docking	Trevor Anderson, Alyson Richards	
2019; 8th Canadian Screen Awards	Pinch	Diego Maclean	
2019; 8th Canadian Screen Awards	Shannon Amen	Chris Dainty, Maral Mohammadian, Michael Fukushima	
2019; 8th Canadian Screen Awards	Uncle Thomas: Accounting for the Days	Regina Pessoa, Abi Feijó, Julie Roy, Reginald de Guillebon	

== 2020s ==
Year	Film	Filmmakers	Ref
2020; 9th Canadian Screen Awards
2020; 9th Canadian Screen Awards	Hot Flash	Thea Hollatz, Kristy Neville, Matt Code, Morghan Fortier, Brett Jubinville	
2020; 9th Canadian Screen Awards	4 North A	Jordan Canning, Howie Shia, Annette Clarke	
2020; 9th Canadian Screen Awards	The Fourfold	Alisi Telengut	
2020; 9th Canadian Screen Awards	The Great Malaise (Le mal du siècle)	Catherine Lepage, Marc Bertrand	
2020; 9th Canadian Screen Awards	I, Barnabé (Moi, Barnabé)	Jean-François Lévesque, Julie Roy	
2021; 10th Canadian Screen Awards
2021; 10th Canadian Screen Awards	Angakusajaujuq: The Shaman's Apprentice	Zacharias Kunuk, Neil Christopher, Nadia Mike, Jonathan Frantz	
2021; 10th Canadian Screen Awards	Boobs (Lolos)	Marie Valade	
2021; 10th Canadian Screen Awards	Flowing Home (Như một dòng sông)	Sandra Desmazières, Dora Benousilio, Julie Roy	
2021; 10th Canadian Screen Awards	The Hangman at Home	Michelle Kranot, Uri Kranot, Lana Tankosa Nikolic, Avi Amar, Katayoun Dibamehr, Emmanuel-Alain Raynal, Pierre Baussaron, Marc Bertrand, Julie Roy	
2021; 10th Canadian Screen Awards	Meneath: The Hidden Island of Ethics	Terril Calder, Jelena Popović	
2022; 11th Canadian Screen Awards
2022; 11th Canadian Screen Awards	The Flying Sailor	Wendy Tilby, Amanda Forbis, David Christensen	
2022; 11th Canadian Screen Awards	Arctic Song	Germaine Arnattaujuq, Neil Christopher, Louise Flaherty, Alicia Smith, David Christensen, Nadia Mike	
2022; 11th Canadian Screen Awards	Impossible Figures and Other Stories I	Marta Pajek, Piotr Szczepanowicz, Grzegorz Wacławek, Maral Mohammadian	
2022; 11th Canadian Screen Awards	The Shadow of My Life	Hajar Moradi	
2022; 11th Canadian Screen Awards	Triangle of Darkness (Triangle noir)	Marie-Noëlle Robidas-Moreau, Nicolas Dufour-Laperrière	
2023; 12th Canadian Screen Awards
2023; 12th Canadian Screen Awards	Where Rabbits Come From (D'où viennent les lapins)	Colin Ludvic Racicot, Bertrand Paquette, Simon Allard	
2023; 12th Canadian Screen Awards	Aphasia (Aphasie)	Marielle Dalpé, Marc Bertrand	
2023; 12th Canadian Screen Awards	Miserable Miracle (Misérable Miracle)	Ryo Orikasa, Emmanuel-Alain Raynal, Pierre Baussaron, Jelena Popović, Nobuaki Doi, Rob McLaughlin, Michael Fukushima	
2023; 12th Canadian Screen Awards	Return to Hairy Hill (Retour à Hairy Hill)	Emily Paige, Daniel Gies	
2023; 12th Canadian Screen Awards	The Temple (Le Temple)	Alain Fournier	
2024; 13th Canadian Screen Awards
2024; 13th Canadian Screen Awards	Maybe Elephants	Torill Kove, Lise Fearnley, Maral Mohammadian, Tonje Skar Reiersen	
2024; 13th Canadian Screen Awards	Beaupré the Giant (Géant Beaupré)	Alain Fournier	
2024; 13th Canadian Screen Awards	Detours Ahead	Esther Cheung	
2024; 13th Canadian Screen Awards	The Little Ancestor (La petite ancêtre)	Alexa Tremblay-Francœur	
2024; 13th Canadian Screen Awards	Society of Clothes (Les gens dans l'armoire)	Jeong Dahee, Emmanuel-Alain Raynal, Pierre Baussaron, Christine Noël	
2025; 14th Canadian Screen Awards
2025; 14th Canadian Screen Awards	The Girl Who Cried Pearls (La jeune fille qui pleurait des perles)	Chris Lavis, Maciek Szczerbowski, Julie Roy, Marc Bertrand, Christine Noël	
2025; 14th Canadian Screen Awards	Bread Will Walk	Alex Boya, Jelena Popović	
2025; 14th Canadian Screen Awards	The Gnawer of Rocks (Mangittatuarjuk)	Louise Flaherty	
2025; 14th Canadian Screen Awards	Ibuka, Justice	Mylène Augustin, Justice Rutikara	
2025; 14th Canadian Screen Awards	Sosuke the Duck	Bekky O'Neil	

== Multiple winners (3 or more) ==
- Marcy Page-8
- Julie Roy-3
- Michael Scott-3
- Chris Landreth-3
- Marc Bertrand-3
- Wendy Tilby-3
- John Weldon-3

== Multiple nominations (3 or more) ==
- Marcy Page-10 (8 wins)
- Marcel Jean-10 (1 win)
- Marc Bertrand-8 (3 wins)
- Julie Roy-9 (3 wins)
- Michael Fukushima-7 (2 wins)
- Wendy Tilby-5 (3 wins)
- Theodore Ushev-5 (2 wins)
- Michael Scott-4 (3 wins)
- John Weldon-4 (3 wins)
- Claude Cloutier-4 (1 win)
- Christopher Hinton-3 (2 wins)
- Cordell Barker-3 (2 wins)
- Amanda Forbis-3 (1 win)
- Yves Leduc-3 (no wins)
- Jelena Popović-3 (no wins)

== See also ==
- Prix Iris for Best Animated Short Film
- List of animation awards
