= Wild Life (2011 film) =

- Directed by: Amanda Forbis; Wendy Tilby
- Written by: Amanda Forbis; Wendy Tilby
- Produced by: Marcy Page; Bonnie Thompson; David Verrall (exec.); David Christensen (exec.)
- Starring: Adam Blackwood; Luba Goy; Anthony Bekenn; Keith Dinicol; Colin Fox; Nonnie Griffin; Ben Carlson; Amy Rutherford
- Music by: Judith Gruber-Stitzer
- Production company: National Film Board of Canada
- Release dates: June 2011; January 6, 2012 (online)
- Running time: 13 minutes 30 seconds
- Country: Canada
- Language: English

Wild Life is a 2011 Canadian animated short film by Wendy Tilby and Amanda Forbis. The film debuted at the 2011 Worldwide Short Film Festival in Toronto in June 2011 and online on January 6, 2012. The film was nominated for Best Animated Short Film at the 84th Academy Awards, and Best Animated Short Subject at the 39th Annie Awards as well as a Genie Award for Best Animated Short at the 32nd Genie Awards.

Based in Calgary, Tilby and Forbis were previously nominated for an Academy Award for Best Animated Short Film for their 1999 NFB film When the Day Breaks, with Tilby also nominated individually for her 1991 NFB short Strings.

Wild Life was produced by Marcy Page and Bonnie Thompson.

== Premise ==
The film follows the story of a dapper young remittance man sent to Alberta from England in 1909, with disastrous results.

== Production ==
In addition to writing and directing the film, Forbis and Tilby drew and painted every animation frame in guache, and wrote the lyrics for the film's final song. They were only able to work on Wild Life part-time, due to commercial obligations, and the film is reported to have taken them from six to over seven years, from concept to completion.

== Awards ==
The film has been nominated as Best Animated Short Film at the 84th Academy Awards, and Best Animated Short Subject at the 39th Annie Awards as well as a Genie Award for Best Animated Short at the 32nd Genie Awards. The short won three honors at the 38th Annual Alberta Film and Television Awards in Calgary, including the Rosie for Best Short. Forbis and Tilby also won the Rosie for Best Animator(s) or Motion Graphic Artist(s), while the award for Best Overall Sound — Drama went to Wild Life creative crew David J. Taylor and Pat Butler. Wild Life won a Golden Sheaf Award for Best Animation at the 2012 Yorkton Film Festival.

== See also ==
- Sunday (Dimanche)
