= The Temple (Lovecraft short story) =

1925 short story by H. P. Lovecraft

- Short story by H. P. Lovecraft
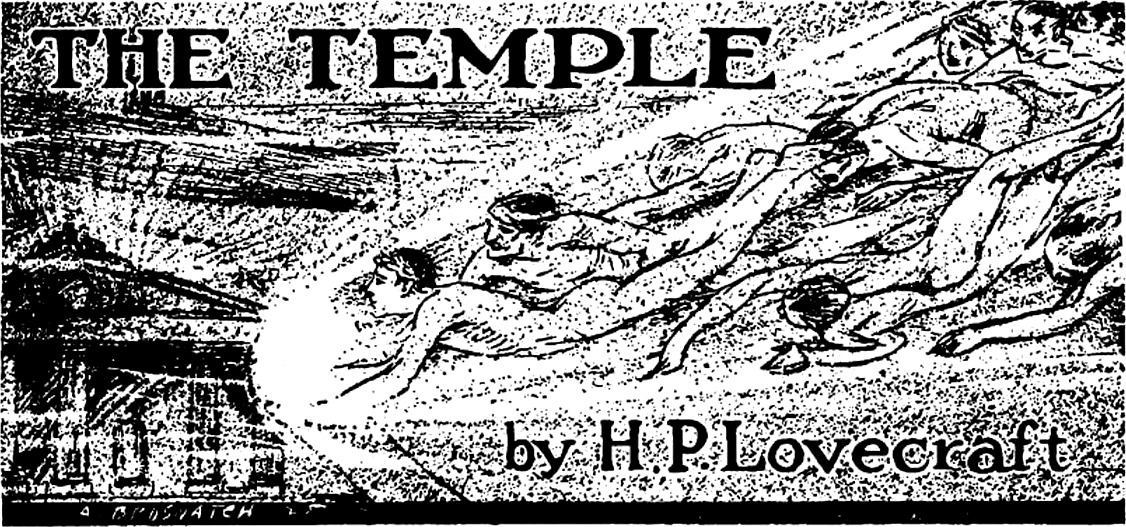
- Illustration from Weird Tales

Text available at Wikisource
- Country: United States
- Language: English
- Genre: Horror short story

Publication
- Published in: Weird Tales
- Publication date: September 1925

"The Temple" is a short story written by H. P. Lovecraft in 1920, and first published in the pulp magazine Weird Tales #24 in September 1925.

== Plot ==
The story is narrated as a "found manuscript" penned by Karl Heinrich, Graf von Altberg-Ehrenstein, a lieutenant-commander in the Imperial German Navy during the days of World War I. Altberg begins by declaring that he has decided to document the events leading up to his untimely end in order to "set certain facts" before the public, aware that he will not survive to do so himself.

In the North Atlantic, after sinking a British freighter and its occupied lifeboats, the cruel and arrogant Altberg commands his U-boat to submerge, surfacing later to find the dead body of a seaman who died clinging to the exterior railing of the sub. A search of the body reveals a strange piece of carved ivory. Because of its apparent great age and value, one of Altberg's officers keeps the object, and shortly thereafter, strange phenomena begin to occur – such as the dead man apparently swimming away rather than sinking.

An uncharted oceanic current pulls the sub southward, and several members of the crew suffer the sudden onset of severe fatigue and disturbing nightmares. One even claims to have seen the dead seamen from the freighter staring at him through the portholes. Altberg has him brutally whipped, rejecting the pleas from some of his men to discard the ivory charm. He eventually resorts to executing a couple of them when it is clear that they have gone insane from fright, ostensibly to maintain discipline. A mysterious explosion irreparably damages the U-boat's engines, leaving them without the ability to navigate. They encounter an American warship, and Altberg kills several more crewmen who urge him to surrender. Later, when the U-boat faces ominous waves from a violent storm, Altberg orders the sub to submerge. Afterward, it is unable to surface when its ballast tanks fail to repressurize, leaving it being pulled southward without resistance while slowly sinking deeper into the ocean; they never see the light of day again.

With the U-boat's batteries running low, and their chance of rescue non-existent, the six remaining, delirious crewmen attempt a mutiny, successfully disabling the U-boat by destroying several key instruments and gauges, even as they rave on about the curse of the ivory talisman. All are murdered by the venomous Altberg. His lone companion, Lieutenant Klenze, grows increasingly unstable and paranoid. Certain of their fate, the two pass the time in their drifting vessel by sweeping the sub's powerful searchlight through the dark abyss, noting that dolphins follow them at depths and for lengths previously unheard-of. Soon after, Klenze goes completely mad, claiming that "He is calling! He is calling!" Unable to soothe his insane companion, and unwilling to join him in suicide, Altberg agrees to operate the airlock, grateful to send Klenze to an assured death in the airless, crushing pressure of the deep.

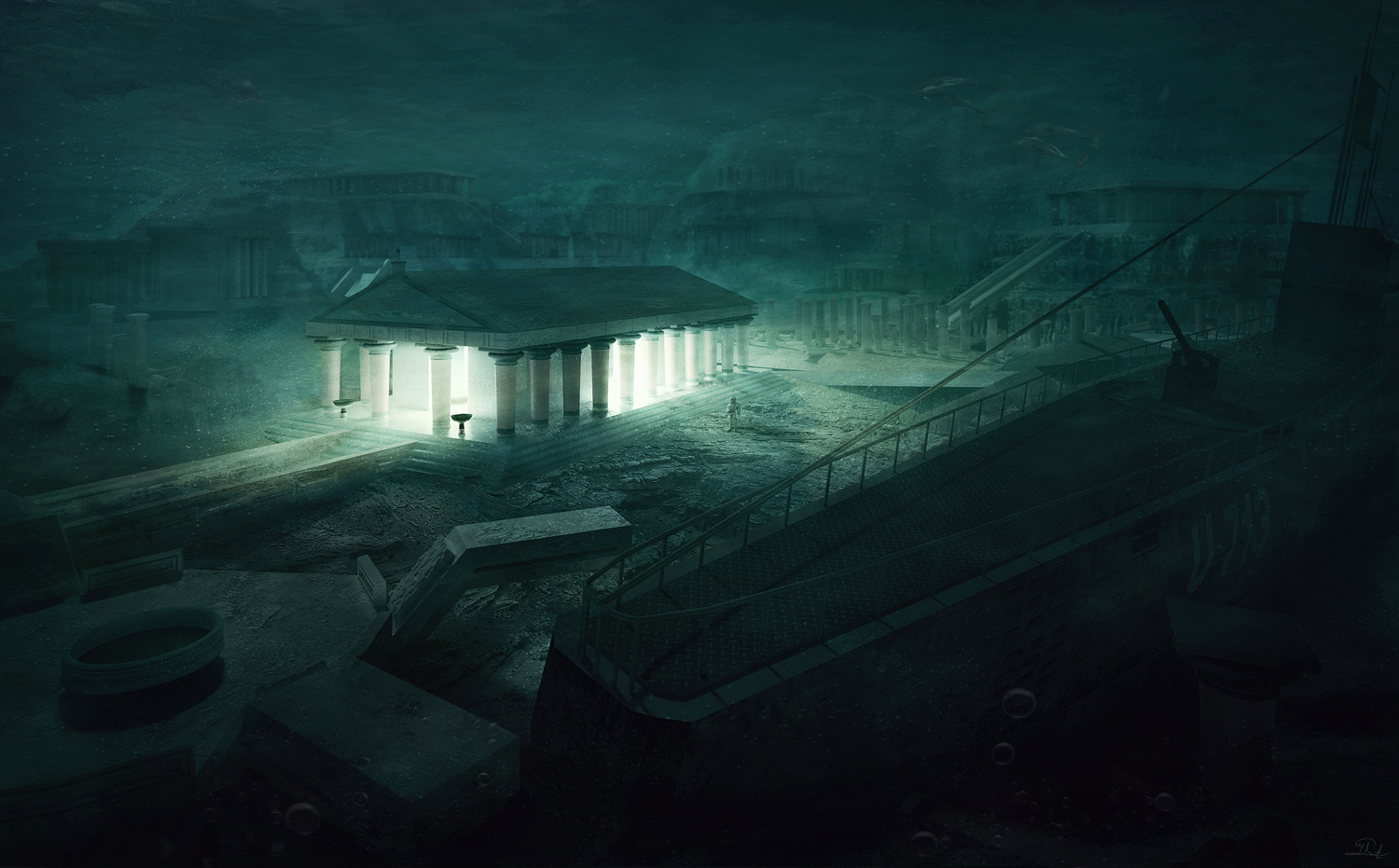
The Temple, artwork by Mihail Bila

Altberg, alone at last, drifts for a couple more days before his U-boat finally lands on the ocean floor, where he is amazed to see the sunken remains of an ancient and elaborate city. Deciding that it is the ruins of Atlantis and overcome with excitement, Altberg dons a deep-sea diving suit, exploring the breathtaking, indescribable beauty of the ruined city and discovering a mysterious rock-hewn temple, amazed to find the image of the ivory carving within. He spends the next couple of days in darkness as the sub's last reserves of battery power and air are expended. In the end, he acknowledges that even with his mighty "German will", he is no longer able to resist the powerful visions and auditory hallucinations, nor his madness-inspired impulse to depart his U-boat and enter the temple, now impossibly illuminated by what seems to be a flickering altar flame. Slipping on his diving suit, he releases his sealed manuscript in a bottle (which is later found on the coast of Yucatan), and goes willingly to his death.

== Connections ==
Like "Dagon", "The Temple" is a nautical story with a World War I background. The theme of submerged cities with non-human worshipers recurs in Lovecraft's later works, most notably "The Call of Cthulhu" and "The Shadow over Innsmouth".

The ivory artifact, "carved to represent a youth's head crowned with laurel," the crew's subsequent madness, and the growing pod of dolphins—the corpses of the crew and the freighter passengers apparently transformed—indicate that "The Temple" is a retelling of a Greek myth wherein Dionysus drives Tyrrhenian pirates mad and transforms them into dolphins (as told in Ovid's Metamorphoses, Pseudo-Apollodorus's Bibliotheca, and the Homeric Hymn to Dionysus).

A sort of sequel can be found in the form of a role-playing game The City in the Sea, where up to four characters must journey by submersible to the temple of the Mythos god Gloon (the malign force behind the events in "The Temple" whose human disguise is depicted by the ivory carving in that story) and end his threat to the human race. This game and its play mechanics may be found in Cthulhu Now, published in 1987 by Chaosium. The Lovecraftian adventure video game Prisoner of Ice (1995) also takes place in a submarine, but during World War II. "The Deep" by Rjurik Davidson, originally published 2001 in Inferno! issue 25 (ISBN 1841541338), adapts the plot to the Warhammer Fantasy fictional universe.

In 2009, Manga artist Gou Tanabe adapted "The Temple" in the manga magazine Comic BEAM. The adaptation changes the time period to World War II. It was later collected with the artist’s adaptations of "The Hound" and "The Nameless City" in 2014. The collection would later be published in English by Dark Horse Comics in 2017.

Canadian animator Alain Fournier adapted the story into the animated short film The Temple in 2022.

== Reception ==
An H. P. Lovecraft Encyclopedia judges "The Temple" to be "marred by crude satire on the protagonist's militarist and chauvinist sentiments", and by "an excess of supernaturalism, with many bizarre occurrences that do not seem to unify into a coherent whole."

== Sources ==
- Helgason, Guðmundur. "WWI U-boats: U 29". German and Austrian U-boats of World War I - Kaiserliche Marine - Uboat.net.
- David E. Schultz, « Exploring "The Temple" », Crypt of Cthulhu, no 38, 1986, p. 26–31,
