= Flowing Home =

2021 Canadian animated short film

- Film poster
- Vietnamese: Như một dòng sông
- Directed by: Sandra Desmazières
- Written by: Sandra Desmazières
- Produced by: Dora Benousilio; Julie Roy
- Starring: Sara Martins; Linh-Dan Pham
- Edited by: Guerric Catala
- Music by: Manuel Merlot
- Animation by: Keyu Chen; Sandra Desmazières; Janet Perlman; Jean-Jacques Prunès; Jing Wang
- Production companies: National Film Board of Canada; Les Films de l'Arlequin
- Release date: July 17, 2021
- Running time: 20 minutes
- Countries: Canada; France
- Language: English

Flowing Home (Vietnamese: Như một dòng sông) is a Canadian animated short film, directed by Sandra Desmazières and released in 2021. The film tells the story of two sisters in Vietnam who are separated during the Vietnam War, and not reunited for 20 years.

The film was shortlisted for the Academy Award for Best Animated Short Film but was not nominated. It also received a Canadian Screen Award nomination for Best Animated Short at the 10th Canadian Screen Awards in 2022.
