= The Hangman at Home =

- Directed by: Michelle Kranot; Uri Kranot
- Produced by: Lana Tankosa Nikolic; Avi Amar; Pierre Baussaron; Katayoun Dibamehr; Emmanuel-Alain Raynal; Marc Bertrand; Julie Roy
- Narrated by: Michelle Kranot (English); Anne Dorval (French)
- Edited by: Michelle Kranot; Uri Kranot
- Music by: Uri Kranot
- Production companies: Late Love Production; Miyu Productions; Floréal Films; National Film Board of Canada
- Distributed by: Miyu Distribution
- Release date: June 1, 2021 (Kraków)
- Running time: 14 minutes
- Countries: Canada; Denmark; France

The Hangman at Home is an internationally co-produced animated film, directed by Michelle Kranot and Uri Kranot and released in 2021. Inspired by Carl Sandburg's poem of the same name, the film depicts five interwoven stories about human vulnerability and the need for emotional connection.

The film was released in both short film and immersive virtual reality editions.

The short film received a Canadian Screen Award nomination for Best Animated Short at the 10th Canadian Screen Awards in 2022.
