= Society of Clothes =

2024 Canadian short film directed by Jeong Dahee

- French: Les gens dans l'armoire
- Directed by: Jeong Dahee
- Written by: Jeong Dahee
- Produced by: Emmanuel-Alain Raynal; Pierre Baussaron; Jeong Dahee; Christine Noël
- Starring: Ko Yangsoon; Roh Yoonju
- Edited by: Jeong Dahee
- Music by: Luigi Allemano
- Animation by: Jeong Dahee; Kim Kyoungha
- Production companies: National Film Board of Canada; Between the Pictures; Miyu Productions
- Release date: May 7, 2024 (Sommets du cinéma d'animation)
- Running time: 15 minutes
- Countries: Canada; France; South Korea
- Language: English

Society of Clothes (French: Les gens dans l'armoire, lit. "The People in the Closet") is an animated short film, written and directed by Jeong Dahee and released in 2024. A coproduction of the National Film Board of Canada with companies from France and South Korea, the film is set in a surreal world in which seemingly disembodied outfits of clothing go about the rituals of everyday life.

The film premiered in May 2024 at the Sommets du cinéma d'animation, where it received a special mention in the Canadian competition. Subsequent screenings included the Bucheon International Fantastic Film Festival, and the Ottawa International Animation Festival.

The film received a Canadian Screen Award nomination for Best Animated Short at the 13th Canadian Screen Awards in 2025.
