= The Flying Sailor =

Animated short film inspired by real events

- Directed by: Wendy Tilby; Amanda Forbis
- Written by: Wendy Tilby; Amanda Forbis
- Produced by: David Christensen
- Music by: Luigi Allemano
- Production company: National Film Board of Canada
- Release date: 13 June 2022
- Running time: 8 minutes
- Country: Canada

The Flying Sailor is a 2022 Canadian independent animated short film directed by Oscar-nominated directors Wendy Tilby and Amanda Forbis. The film debuted at the 2022 Annecy International Animation Film Festival and has received several nominations and awards, including a nomination for Best Animated Short Film at the 95th Academy Awards, and winning the award for the Best Canadian Film at the Ottawa International Animation Festival.

The film was named to the Toronto International Film Festival's annual year-end Canada's Top Ten list for 2022.

== Plot ==
When a nearby ship explodes, a sailor is launched on an unexpected existential voyage. The 8-minute short explores the fragility of life through a sailor's near-death experience inspired by the real life catastrophic Halifax Explosion of 1917. The last credit states the film is dedicated to "Charlie Mayers - A Sailor who, in the Halifax Explosion of 1917, flew over 2 kilometers and lived to tell about it."

== Inspiration ==
Charles Mayers was an officer aboard the SS Middleham Castle, a ship moored at a wharf in Halifax Harbour on the morning of the explosion. Mayers was blown from the ship's deck to land on Fort Needham Hill overlooking the harbour, injured and naked but alive. Tilby and Forbis were inspired by the story when they encountered it on a visit to the Halifax Explosion exhibit at the Maritime Museum of the Atlantic in Halifax.

== Reception ==
| Year | Award | Award/Category | Status | Ref |
|---|---|---|---|---|
| 2022 | Ottawa International Animation Festival | Best Canadian Film | Won | |
| 2022 | Calgary International Film Festival | Best Animated Film | Won | |
| 2022 | Countryside Animafest Cyprus | Best Narrative Film | Won | |
| 2023 | 95th Academy Awards | Best Animated Short Film | Nominated | |
| 2023 | 11th Canadian Screen Awards | Best Animated Short | Won | |
| 2023 | Sundance Film Festival | Short Jury Award: Animation | Won | |
