= Aria (2001 film) =

- Directed by: Pjotr Sapegin
- Written by: Berit Reiss-Andersen
- Produced by: David Reiss-Andersen; Marcel Jean
- Cinematography: Janne Hansen
- Edited by: Pål Gengenbach
- Music by: Giacomo Puccini; Normand Roger
- Animation by: Pjotr Sapegin
- Production companies: National Film Board of Canada; Pravda Productions
- Release date: September 23, 2001 (Cinéfest)
- Running time: 11 minutes
- Countries: Canada; Norway

Aria is an animated short film, directed by Pjotr Sapegin and released in 2001. A Canadian–Norwegian coproduction, the film is a stop-motion animation version of Madame Butterfly, set to an arrangement by Normand Roger of excerpts from Giacomo Puccini's original opera.

The film was a Genie Award nominee for Best Animated Short at the 22nd Genie Awards in 2002, and won an Amanda Award for Best Short Film at the Norwegian International Film Festival in 2002.
