= Sarah Van Den Boom =

- Born: 1975 (age 50–51)
- Occupations: Film director, screenwriter, animator

Sarah Van Den Boom is a French animation film director and co-founder of the Papy3D Productions production company.

== Biography ==
Van Den Boom studied arts in the ESAG Penninghen, then in the animation workshop of the ENSAD in Paris, France. After graduating in 2000, she started the production of her first animation short film, Novecento, pianist, adapted from the famous novel by Alessandro Baricco. She then worked as a technician on animated TV series and short films, before creating several commercials for Acme Filmworks.

In 2009 she directed her second personal film, The Skeleton-Woman, inspired by a famous Inuit story. The film was included in the list of 10 selected short films for the Cesar for the Best Animation Film, 2011.

Her third film, In Deep Waters, co-produced with the National Film Board of Canada, was released in 2015, and won awards in Annecy, in Clermont-Ferrand and in Brooklyn. It was included in the online My French Film Festival. It was included in the list of 12 animation short films selected for the Cesar for the Best Animation Short Film, 2016.

Her last stopmotion film Raymonde Or The Vertical Escape was nominated for the Cesar for the Best Animation Short Film in 2019. It won major awards in Leeds, Vila Do Conde, Brooklyn and Brisbane. It also won the French broadcast France Télévisions award in 2019, awarded during the Clermont-Ferrand festival.

== Filmography ==
=== Short films ===
Year	Title of film	Roles
2005	Novecento, pianist	director, screenwriter, art direction, backgrounds and animation
2009	The Skeleton-Woman	director, screenwriter, editing, art direction and backgrounds
2015	In Deep Waters	director, screenwriter, editing, art direction, and backgrounds
2018	Raymonde Or The Vertical Escape	director, screenwriter, editing, art direction, sets, puppets and costumes
