= Red of the Yew Tree =

- Directed by: Marie-Hélène Turcotte
- Written by: Daniel Canty; Marie-Hélène Turcotte
- Produced by: Félix Dufour-Laperrière; Nicolas Dufour-Laperrière
- Edited by: Félix Dufour-Laperrière
- Production company: L'Embuscade Films
- Release date: 2016
- Running time: 12 minutes
- Country: Canada

Red of the Yew Tree (French: If ou le rouge perdu) is a Canadian animated short film, directed by Marie-Hélène Turcotte and released in 2016.

The film was shortlisted for Best Animated Short at the 5th Canadian Screen Awards.
