= Caninabis =

1979 animated short film by Kaj Pindal

- Film title card.
- Directed by: Kaj Pindal
- Written by: Kaj Pindal; Yvon Mallette
- Produced by: Gaston Sarault
- Music by: Denis Larochelle
- Animation by: Kaj Pindal
- Release date: 1979
- Running time: 9 minutes
- Languages: French, English

Caninabis is a 1979 Canadian animated short film by Kaj Pindal.

== Summary ==
It explores a dog's addiction to marijuana while having a brilliant career on the drug squad only to mistaken a farm fertilizer for weed, causing an un-called "bust".

== Accolades ==
- 1980: Canadian Screen Award for Best Animated Short (nominated)
