= A Visit (film) =

- Film poster
- Une visite
- Directed by: Parissa Mohit
- Written by: Parissa Mohit
- Produced by: Parissa Mohit
- Cinematography: Parissa Mohit
- Edited by: Shahab Mihandoust
- Music by: Martin Floyd Cesar
- Distributed by: Traveling
- Release date: May 5, 2018 (Oberhausen)
- Running time: 13 minutes
- Country: Canada

A Visit (French: Une visite) is a Canadian animated short film, directed by Parissa Mohit and released in 2018. The film centres on a child visiting a woman, whose interactions with each other and the world around them become increasingly phantasmagorical.

The film premiered at the Oberhausen International Short Film Festival.

It received a Canadian Screen Award nomination for Best Animated Short Film at the 7th Canadian Screen Awards in 2019.
