= 22nd Genie Awards =

2002 Canadian film awards ceremony

- Date: 7 February 2002
- Hosted by: Brian Linehan

Highlights
- Most awards: Atanarjuat: The Fast Runner (6)
- Most nominations: Atanarjuat: The Fast Runner (7); The War Bride (7)

The 22nd Genie Awards were held in 2002 to honour films released in 2001. The ceremony was hosted by Brian Linehan.

In advance of the Genie Award ceremony on February 7, all of the Best Picture nominees were screened at the Bloor Cinema in the week of January 26 to 30. All except the three-hour Atanarjuat: The Fast Runner were preceded by one of the four Best Live Action Short Drama nominees.

== Nominees and winners ==
The Genie Award winner in each category is shown in bold text.

Motion Picture	Direction
**Atanarjuat: The Fast Runner, Norman Cohn, Zacharias Kunuk, Germaine Wong and Paul Apak Angilirq**; Eisenstein, Martin Paul-Hus and Regine Schmid; The War Bride, Douglas Berquist and Alistair Maclean-Clark; Treed Murray, Helen du Toit; Soft Shell Man (Un crabe dans la tête), Luc Déry and Joseph Hillel	**Zacharias Kunuk, Atanarjuat: The Fast Runner**; Renny Bartlett, Eisenstein; Bernard Émond, The Woman Who Drinks (La Femme qui boit); Denis Chouinard, Tar Angel (L'Ange de goudron); William Phillips, Treed Murray
Actor in a leading role	Actress in a leading role
**Brendan Fletcher, The Law of Enclosures**; Zachary Bennett, Desire; Zinedine Soualem, Tar Angel (L'Ange de goudron); Peter Outerbridge, Marine Life; Chris Owens, The Uncles; David La Haye, Soft Shell Man (Un crabe dans la tête)	**Élise Guilbault, The Woman Who Drinks (La Femme qui boit)**; Katja Riemann, Desire; Jillian Fargey, Protection; Sarah Polley, The Law of Enclosures; Anna Friel, The War Bride
Actor in a supporting role	Actress in a supporting role
**Vincent Gale, Last Wedding**; Michel Forget, The Woman Who Drinks (La Femme qui boit); Tom Scholte, Last Wedding; Julian Richings, The Claim; Loren Dean, The War Bride	**Molly Parker, Last Wedding**; Marya Delver, Last Wedding; Mimi Kuzyk, Lost and Delirious; Brenda Fricker, The War Bride; Molly Parker, The War Bride
Screenplay	Documentary
**Paul Apak Angilirq, Atanarjuat: The Fast Runner**; Renny Bartlett, Eisenstein; Judith Thompson, Lost and Delirious; Catherine Martin, Marriages (Mariages); André Turpin, Soft Shell Man (Un crabe dans la tête)	**Westray, Paul Cowan**; Obāchan's Garden, Selwyn Jacob and Linda Ohama
Best Live Action Short Drama	Best Animated Short
**The Heart of the World, Guy Maddin and Jody Shapiro**; Camera, David Cronenberg and Jody Shapiro; Side Orders (Foie de canard et cœur de femme), Christiane Ciupka, Stéphane Lapointe and Marie-Josée Larocque; Three Stories from the End of Everything, John Buchan and Semi Chellas	**Marcy Page and Paul Driessen, The Boy Who Saw the Iceberg**; Pjotr Sapegin, Marcel Jean and David Reiss-Anderson, Aria; Jennifer Torrance and Cordell Barker, Strange Invaders
Art Direction/Production Design	Cinematography
**Ken Rempel, The War Bride**; Ken Rempel, The Claim; William Fleming and Shelley Nieder, Deeply; André-Line Beauparlant, The Woman Who Drinks (La Femme qui boit); Tony Devenyi, Last Wedding	**Pierre Gill, Lost and Delirious**; David Greene, Century Hotel; Sebastian Edschmid, Deeply; Thom Best, Ginger Snaps; André Turpin, Soft Shell Man (Un crabe dans la tête)
Costume Design	Editing
**Howard Burden, The War Bride**; Atuat Akkitirq, Atanarjuat: The Fast Runner; Joanne Hansen, The Claim; Sophie Lefebvre, The Woman Who Drinks (La Femme qui boit); Nicoletta Massone, Varian's War	**Norman Cohn, Zacharias Kunuk and Marie-Christine Sarda, Atanarjuat: The Fast Runner**; Jon Gregory, Deeply; Wiebke von Carolsfeld, Eisenstein; Brett Sullivan, Ginger Snaps; Ross Weber, Last Wedding
Overall Sound	Sound Editing
**Todd Beckett, Christian Carruthers, Herwig Gayer, Bissa Scekic and Todd Warren, Treed Murray**; Richard Lavoie, Serge Boivin and Jean Paul Vialard, Atanarjuat: The Fast Runner; Pierre Blain, Michel Descombes and Réjean Juteau, The Hidden Fortress; Luc Boudrias, Yvon Benoît, Jo Caron and Benoit Leduc, Karmina 2; Dominique Chartrand, Luc Boudrias, Bernard Gariépy Strobl and Hans Peter Strobl, A Girl at the Window (Une jeune fille à la fenêtre)	**Stephen Barden, Kevin Banks, Joe Bracciale, John Sievert and Virginia Storey, Treed Murray**; David McCallum, Fred Brennan, Garrett Kerr, Mishann Lau, Donna Powell, Jane Tattersall and Robert Warchol, Ginger Snaps; Marcel Pothier, Mathieu Beaudin, Jérôme Décarie, Jacques Plante and Claire Pochon, Karmina 2; Gael MacLean, Jim Harrington, Patrick Haskill, Michael Keeping and Gina Mueller, Marine Life; Marcel Pothier, Guy Francoeur, Carole Gagnon, Dominik Pagacz and Jacques Plante, A Girl at the Window (Une jeune fille à la fenêtre)
Achievement in Music: Original Score	Achievement in Music: Original Song
**Chris Crilly, Atanarjuat: The Fast Runner**; Bertrand Chénier, Tar Angel (L'Ange de goudron); Alexander Balanescu, Eisenstein; Don Pyle and Andrew Zealley, The Law of Enclosures; Pierre Duchesne, A Girl at the Window (Une jeune fille à la fenêtre)	**Ron Sexsmith, "Love Is Free" — The Art of Woo**; Chantal Kreviazuk and Raine Maida, "Can't Make It Good" — Century Hotel; Osvaldo Montes, "La niebla del tiempo" — On Your Head (Le Ciel sur la tête); Simon Kendall, Tom Landa and Geoffrey Kelly, "Parting Glass" — Lunch with Charles; Jim McGrath, Joel Feeney and Marc Jordan, "Falling Forward" — Treed Murray
Special awards	
Claude Jutra Award: Zacharias Kunuk, Atanarjuat: The Fast Runner; Golden Reel Award: Wedding Night; Special Award: Gerald Pratley	
