= Wendy Tilby and Amanda Forbis =

Canadian animators

Wendy Tilby Amanda Forbis
- Born: 1960 (age 65–66); 1963 (age 62–63)
- Style: Animation

Wendy Tilby and Amanda Forbis are a Canadian animation duo. On January 24, 2012, they received their second Oscar nomination, for the National Film Board of Canada (NFB) animated short film, Wild Life (2011). With their latest film, The Flying Sailor, they received several nominations and awards, including for the Best Canadian Film at the Ottawa International Animation Festival, and on January 24, 2023, they received a nomination for the 95th Academy Awards under the category Best Animated Short Film.

== Careers ==
Both originally from Alberta, they first met in Vancouver at the Emily Carr College of Art and Design. In 2003, they relocated from Montreal to Calgary, where Forbis was raised. In addition to their NFB work, they have collaborated on commissioned projects. Interview, their advert for United Airlines, was nominated for an Emmy in 2004. In 2007, they founded the Bleak Midwinter Film Festival in their home neighbourhood of Inglewood, Calgary. In 2018, they were recipients of ASIFA’s Winsor McCay Award for their ‘exceptional contribution to the art of animation’.

== Filmography ==
=== Wendy Tilby ===
==== Writer/Director ====
- Tables of Content, Short film (1986)
- Strings, Short film (1991)
- When the Day Breaks, Short film (1999)
- Wild Life, Short film (2011)
- The Flying Sailor (2022)

==== NFB animation work ====
- Manufacturing Consent: Noam Chomsky and the Media, Documentary (1992)
- A Case Study: Cambodia and East Timor, Short documentary (1994)
- A Propaganda Model of the Media Plus Exploring Alternative Media, Short (1994)
- Concision: No Time for New Ideas, Short (1994)
- Holocaust Denial vs. Freedom of Speech, Short documentary (1994)
- Toward a Vision of a Future Society, Short documentary (1994)

=== Amanda Forbis ===
==== Writer/Director ====
- When the Day Breaks, Short film (1999)
- Wild Life, Short film (2011)
- The Flying Sailor (2022)

==== NFB animation work ====
- Seven Crows a Secret, Short Documentary (1994)
- Trawna Tuh Belvul, short animation (1994)
- The Reluctant Deckhand, short animation (1995)
- Joe, Short (2003)

== Awards ==
They were previously nominated for an Academy Award for Best Animated Short Film for their 1999 NFB film When the Day Breaks (1999). This film also won the award for Best Short Film at the Cannes Film Festival, as well as the Canadian Screen Award for Best Animated Short. and Grand Prix at the World Festival of Animated Film – Animafest Zagreb. Tilby was also nominated individually for her 1991 NFB short Strings.

The Flying Sailor (2022) premiered at the Annecy Animation Festival and has received a number of awards, including Best Canadian Film at the Ottawa International Animation Festival, Best Animation at the New York City Short Film Festival and both Best Character-Based and Experimental Award at the Los Angeles Animation Festival. It is included in The New Yorker Screening Room and has been selected to the 2023 Sundance Film Festival. On December 21, 2022, it was shortlisted for the 95th Academy Awards under the category Best Animated Short Film.

== Personal lives ==
=== Wendy Tilby ===
Wendy Tilby was born in 1960 in Edmonton, Alberta. She studied visual arts and literature at the University of Victoria before attending the Emily Carr Institute of Art and Design, where she majored in film and animation. With the success of her student film, Tables of Content, Tilby was invited to join the National Film Board of Canada in Montreal. Her first film, Strings (1991), won many international awards including an Academy Award nomination, a Genie Award (Academy of Canadian Cinema) and first prize at the Hiroshima International Animation Festival. Tilby has taught animation at Concordia University and Harvard, and from 2007–2009 she was external examiner for animation at the Royal College of Art in London.

=== Amanda Forbis ===
Amanda Forbis was born in Calgary, Alberta in 1963. She studied theatre and fine art at University of Lethbridge before attending the Emily Carr Institute of Art and Design where her major was film, video, and animation. She joined the National Film Board of Canada (Vancouver) in 1990 as animation director on an educational film titled The Reluctant Deckhand. Forbis has also worked as an instructor at the Arts Umbrella Children's Art Centre in Vancouver, and has led numerous animation workshops for children.

== Animation styles ==
=== Strings ===
This film was not a collaboration between Tilby and Forbis, it was only worked on by Tilby. The animation style used is reminiscent of Caroline Leaf's method of painting on frosted glass, used in her 1976 short film, The Street. However, Tilby used bottom-lighting in her film, instead of top lighting like Caroline Leaf. She used an animation camera apparatus and worked directly under the camera, she applied, moved, and removed the colored paints on the glass until the frame was finished. When the frame was complete she took two frames worth of footage from the overhead camera. Then she would modify the image to make the next frame, and repeat the process. To make details on the characters' faces and in their body language Tilby used a stylus and scratched details into the paint. She also used her fingers, q-tips, and tissues to move the paint around the glass and change the scene. Tilby enjoys using this method because the artist erases the previous work as they go, and it forces her not to dwell on what she has already shot and keep going with the filming.

=== When the Day Breaks ===
Tilby and Forbis experimented with several styles and techniques before discovering the video printer which captures and print video frames (3x4 inches) onto thermal paper. Their technique was to shoot footage with a hi-8 camera enlisting themselves and friends as actors. Selected frames were printed then photocopied onto regular bond paper. Using pencil and oil sticks, they rendered directly onto the photocopies to create animal characters, add animation (i.e. dogs chasing ambulance), and eliminate unwanted details. All images were then shot under a 35mm rostrum camera. This technique was designed to save time, however, the film took about four years to complete.

=== Wild Life ===
For Wild Life, Tilby and Forbis were determined to find a technique that did not involve hand painting every frame. Also, they wanted to take advantage of the computer and its time-saving possibilities. They eventually found that the computer drawing wouldn't work and that only real paint could deliver the desired look. They chose gouache for its flexibility and aimed for a rough, folk art style. They did, however, use the computer extensively for animation, compositing and editing. They were only able to work on Wild Life part-time, due to commercial obligations, and the film is reported to have taken them from six to over seven years, from concept to completion. In addition to writing, directing and animating the film, Forbis and Tilby wrote the lyrics for the film's final song.

=== The Flying Sailor ===
This short was co-directed by Tilby and Forbis and was made using 2D hand-drawn animation and 3D CG animation, as well as live action footage. The directors chose to work with 3D to achieve the desired look and feel of an exploding city. This choice was a challenge for the filmmakers, who specialise in traditional 2D hand-drawn animation. They enlisted local Maya artist, William Dyer, to sculpt a virtual topography reminiscent of 1917 Halifax, and Forbis and Tilby created the painted ‘skins’ that covered everything. Aesthetically, they were aiming to combine that rinky-dink model train set quality with a hand-tinted postcard look. Using combinations of CG animation, stock footage and hand painted elements, everything was edited together in Adobe AfterEffects. The process was highly experimental and more complicated than they had first imagined.
