= Pjotr Sapegin =

Russian-born animator

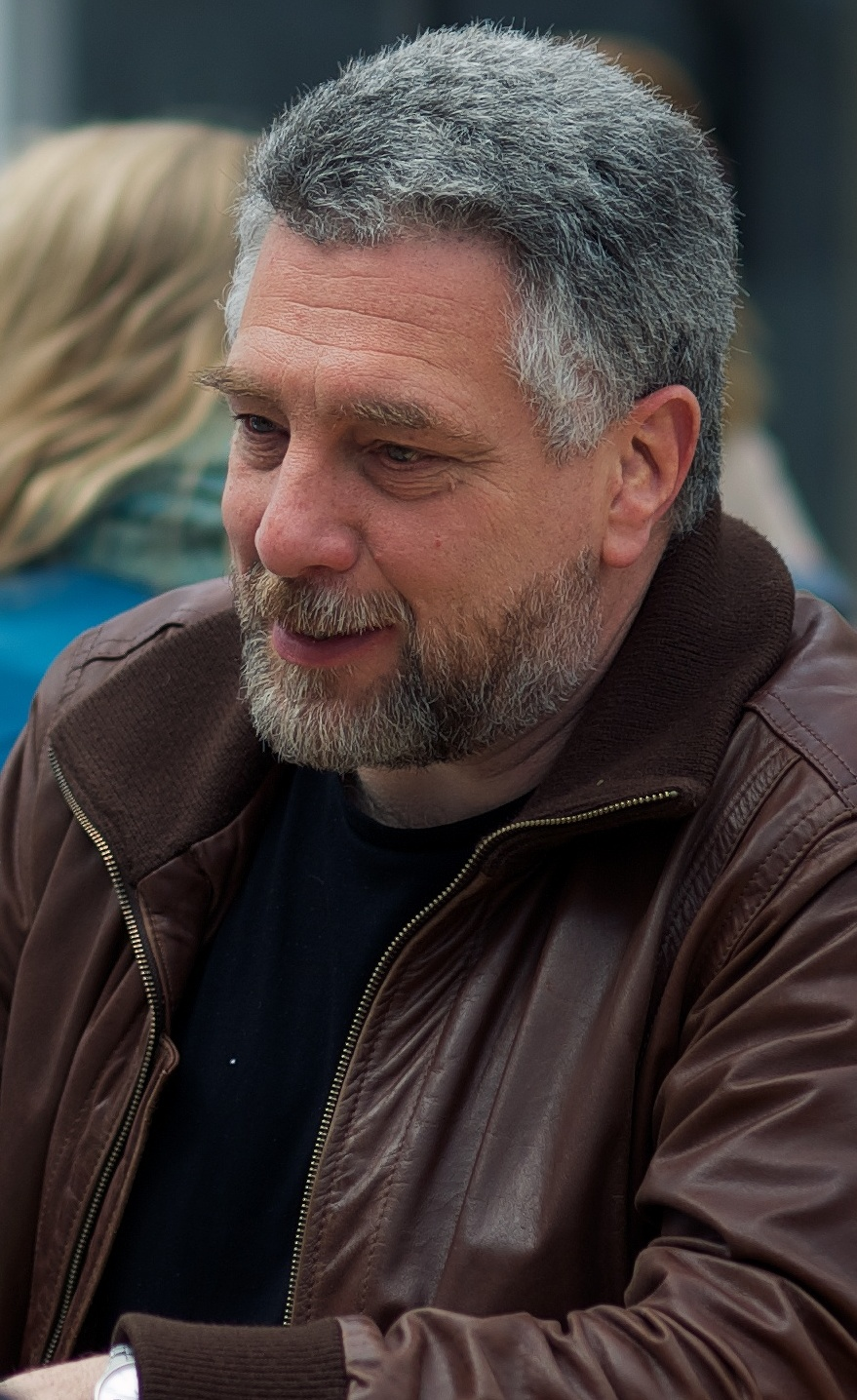
- Born: December 4, 1955 (age 70); Moscow, Russia
- Occupation: animator

Pjotr Klimentevich Sapegin (born December 4, 1955) is a Russian-born animator based in Norway.

Born and raised in Moscow, he emigrated to Norway in 1990. He was a cofounder of the Studio Magica animation studio, later founding the Pravda animation studio after Magica's closure.

He first became widely known for his 1995 short Mons the Cat (Katten Mons), later receiving attention for his earlier Edvard series of films loosely based on composer Edvard Grieg. Two of his most noted later films, 2001's Aria and 2004's Through My Thick Glasses (Gjennom mine tykke briller) were coproduced by the National Film Board of Canada.

He is a two-time Amanda Award winner for Best Short Film at the Norwegian International Film Festival, winning in 1998 for One Day a Man Bought a House (Huset på Kampen) and in 2002 for Aria, and a two-time Genie Award nominee for Best Animated Short, receiving nods at the 22nd Genie Awards in 2002 for Aria and at the 25th Genie Awards in 2005 for Through My Thick Glasses.

== Filmography ==
- 1992 - Edvard
- 1993 - Edvard: The Naked Truth (Edvard – den nakne sannhet)
- 1993 - Edvard: The Unbearable Lightness of Longing (Edvard – lengselens uutholdelige letthet)
- 1993 - Fishballs (Fiskeboller)
- 1994 - Ippolita – den lille amasone
- 1995 - Edvard: The Stand-In (Edvard – på bronseplass)
- 1995 - Mons the Cat (Katten Mons)
- 1996 - Edvard: The Cruise Tripper (Edvard – ferietid)
- 1996 - Hundeflax
- 1996 - Skilpaddeflax
- 1997 - Bamseflax
- 1997 - Okseflax
- 1998 - One Day a Man Bought a House (Huset på Kampen)
- 1998 - The Salt Mill (Saltkvernen)
- 1999 - Snails (Sniler)
- 2000 - In a Corner of the World (I et hjørne av verden)
- 2001 - Aria
- 2004 - Through My Thick Glasses (Gjennom mine tykke briller)
- 2005 - Grandpa Is a Raisin (Nå skal du høre...)
- 2010 - The Last Norwegian Troll (Det siste norske trollet)
- 2013 - Berserk
- 2019 - Origin of Man (Menneskets opprinnelse)
