= Henri Michaux =

Belgian-born French poet, writer and painter

- Born: 24 May 1899; Namur, Belgium
- Died: 19 October 1984 (aged 85); Paris, France
- Occupations: Poet, journalist and painter
- Writing career
- Genres: Surrealism, asemic writing
- Notable works: My Properties (1929); Plume (1938); Miserable Miracle: Mescaline (1956)

Henri Michaux (French: [ɑ̃ʁi miʃo]; 24 May 1899 – 19 October 1984) was a Belgian-born French experimental poet, writer and painter. Michaux is renowned for his strange, highly original poetry and prose, and also for his art: the Paris Museum of Modern Art and the Guggenheim Museum in New York had shows of his work in 1978 (see below, Visual Arts). His autobiographical texts that chronicle his psychedelic experiments with LSD and mescaline include Miserable Miracle and The Major Ordeals of the Mind and the Countless Minor Ones. He is recognised for his idiosyncratic travelogues and books of art criticism. Michaux is also known for his stories about Plume – "a peaceable man" – one of the most unenterprising heroes in literature, a character subject to many misfortunes.

His poetic works have often been republished in France, where they are studied along with significant poets of French literature. In 1955 he became a citizen of France, and he lived the rest of his life there. He became a friend of Romanian pessimist philosopher Emil Cioran around the same time, along with other literary luminaries in France. In 1965 he won the grand prix national des Lettres, which he refused to accept, as he did every honor he was accorded in his life.

== Biography ==
=== Travels ===
In 1930 and 1931, Michaux visited Japan, China and India. The result of this trip was the book A Barbarian in Asia. Asian culture became one of his biggest influences. The philosophy of Buddhism and calligraphy later became principal subjects of many of his poems and inspired many of his drawings. He also visited Ecuador and published a travelogue book of the same name. His travels across the Americas finished in Brazil in 1939, and he stayed there for two years.

=== Visual arts ===
Michaux was a visual artist of some originality, associated with the Tachiste movement in the 1940s and 50s, although that describes only a small part of his artistic achievement—for example, his hallucinatory representations of faces and heads. His work often makes use of dense, suggestively gestural strokes that incorporate elements of calligraphy, asemic writing, and abstract expressionism. The Museum of Modern Art in Paris and the Guggenheim Museum in New York both had shows of his work in 1978.

== Adaptations ==
Japanese animator Ryo Orikasa adapted Michaux's poetry for the 2023 short film Miserable Miracle, winner of the top animated short prize at the Ottawa International Animation Festival.

== Works ==
His complete works were published by Gallimard in three volumes of the Pléiade series, 1998–2004.

- Cas de folie circulaire (1922)
- Les Rêves et la Jambe (1923)
- Fables des origines (Disque vert, 1923)
- Qui je fus (1927). Who I Was
- Mes propriétés (Fourcade, 1929). My Properties
- La Jetée (1929)
- Ecuador (1929). Ecuador: A Travel Journal, trans. Robin Magowan (1970)
- Un certain Plume (Editions du Carrefour, 1930; revised 1938 and 1963 as Plume). A Certain Plume, trans. Richard Sieburth (New York Review Books, 2018)
- Un barbare en Asie (1933; revised 1945). A Barbarian in Asia, trans. Sylvia Beach (1949)
- La nuit remue (1935). The Night Moves
- Voyage en Grande Garabagne (1936). Voyage to Great Garaban
- La Ralentie (1937)
- Plume précédé de Lointain Intérieur (1938; revised 1963). Plume preceded by Faraway Within. 1963 edition includes the "Postface"
- Peintures (GLM, 1939). Paintings
- Au pays de la magie (1941). In the Land of Magic
- Arbres des tropiques (1942)
- Épreuves, Exorcismes : 1940-1944 (1945). Ordeals, Exorcisms: 1940-1944
- Ici, Poddema (1946)
- Peintures et dessins (Le point du jour, 1946)
- Meidosems (Le point du jour, 1948). Meidosems: Poems and Lithographs, trans. Elizabeth R. Jackson (1992)
- Nous deux encore (10 Lambert, 1948)
- Poésie pour pouvoir (René Drouin, 1949)
- Passages (1950)
- Mouvements (recueil) (1952)
- Face aux verrous (1954)
- Misérable Miracle (La mescaline) (1956). Miserable Miracle, trans. Louise Varèse (1963)
- L'Infini turbulent (1957). Infinite Turbulence, trans. Michael Fineberg (1975)
- Paix dans les brisements (1959)
- Connaissance par les gouffres (1961). Light Through Darkness, trans. Haakon Chevalier (1964)
- Vents et Poussières (1962)
- Désagrégation (1965)
- Les Grandes Épreuves de l'esprit et les innombrables petites (1966). The Major Ordeals of the Mind, trans. Richard Howard (1974)
- Vers la complétude (Saisie et Dessaisies) (GLM, 1966)
- Façons d'endormi, façons d'éveillé (1969). Ways of Sleepers, Ways of Wakers
- Poteaux d'angle (1971). Tent Posts, trans. Lynn Hoggard (1997)
- En rêvant à partir de peintures énigmatiques (Fata Morgana, 1972). Dreams Like Enigmatic Paintings, trans. Michael Eales (2018)
- Émergences, Résurgences (Skira, 1972). Emergences/Resurgences, trans. Richard Sieburth (Skira, 2000)
- Bras cassé (Fata Morgana, 1973)
- Moments, traversées du temps (1973). Moments, Crossings of Time
- Quand tombent les toits (1973)
- Par la voie des rythmes (Fata Morgana, 1974)
- Idéogrammes en Chine (Fata Morgana, 1975). Ideograms in China, trans. Gustaf Sobin (2002)
- Coups d'arrêt (1975)
- Face à ce qui se dérobe (1976)
- Les ravagés (Fata Morgana, 1976)
- Jours de silence (Fata Morgana, 1978)
- Saisir (Fata Morgana, 1979)
- Une voie pour l'insubordination (Fata Morgana, 1980)
- Affrontements (Fata Morgana, 1981)
- Chemins cherchés, chemins perdus, transgressions (1982). Paths Looked For, Paths Lost, Transgressions
- Les commencements (Fata Morgana, 1983)
- Le jardin exalté (Fata Morgana, 1983)
- Par surprise (Fata Morgana, 1983). By Surprise, trans. Randolph Hough (1987)
- Par des traits (Fata Morgana, 1984)
- Déplacements, Dégagements (1985; posthumous). Spaced, Displaced, trans. David and Helen Constantine (1992)
- Rencontres (with Paolo Marinotti) (1991; posthumous)
- Jeux d'encre. Trajet Zao Wou-Ki (1993; posthumous)
- En songeant à l'avenir (1994; posthumous)
- J'excuserais une assemblée anonyme... (1994; posthumous)
- À distance (Mercure de France, 1997; posthumous)
- Sitôt lus. Lettres à Franz Hellens. 1922-1952 (Fayard, 1999; posthumous)
- Paul Klee (Fata Morgana, 2012; posthumous)
- Donc c'est non, lettres réunies, ed. Jean-Luc Outers (Gallimard, 2016; posthumous)
- Coups d'arrêt suivi d’Ineffable vide (Éditions Unes, 2018; posthumous)

=== Selections prepared by Michaux ===
- L'Espace du dedans (1944; revised and expanded in 1966). Selected Writings: The Space Within, partial translation by Richard Ellmann (New Directions, 1951; reprinted in 1968). Translation contains selections from: Qui je fus, Ecuador, Mes propriétés, Un certain Plume, La nuit remue, Voyage en Grande Garabagne, Lointain intérieur, Peintures, and Au pays de la magie, with "The March into the Tunnel" added from Épreuves, Exorcismes.
- Ailleurs (1948). Compiles Voyage en Grande Garabagne (1936), Au pays de la magie (1941) and Ici, Poddema (1946)
- La Vie dans les plis (1949). Life in the Folds, trans. Darren Jackson (2016). Compiles Liberté d'action (1945), Apparitions (1946), Meidosems (illustrated edition, 1948), Lieux inexprimables (1947) and Vieillesse de Pollagoras (previously unpublished)
- L'Espace du dedans (second edition, 1966). Revised and expanded with selections from Épreuves, exorcismes, La vie dans les plis, Passages, Lecture, Face aux verrous, Misérable miracle, and Paix dans les brisements.

=== Compilations in English ===
- Selected Writings: The Space Within, partial translation by Richard Ellmann (New Directions, 1951; reprinted in 1968)
- Darkness Moves: An Henri Michaux Anthology, 1927-1984, trans. and ed. David Ball (University of California Press, 1994)
- Michaux, trans. Teo Savory (Unicorn Press, 1967)
- Henri Michaux: A Selection, trans. Michael Fineberg (1979)
- Someone Wants to Steal My Name and Other Poems, ed. Nin Andrews (2004)
- Stroke by Stroke, trans. Richard Sieburth (2006). Compiles Saisir (1979) and Par des traits (1984)
- By Surprise, trans. Randolph Hough (Hanuman Books, 1987)
- Toward Totality & Selected Works, 1929–1973, trans. Louise Landes-Levi (Shivastan, 2006)
- Thousand Times Broken: Three Books, trans. Gillian Conoley (City Lights, 2014). Compiles 400 Men on the Cross, "Peace in the Breaking", and Watchtowers on Targets
- Life in the Folds, trans. Darren Jackson (2016)
- Storms Under the Skin: Selected Poems, 1927-1954, trans. Jane Draycott (Two Rivers Press, 2017)
