= Inner City (2011 film) =

- Film poster
- French: La Cité entre les murs
- Directed by: Alain Fournier
- Written by: Alain Fournier
- Produced by: Alain Fournier
- Cinematography: Barry Russell
- Edited by: Alain Fournier
- Music by: Patrick Lavoie
- Animation by: Alain Fournier
- Release date: August 17, 2011
- Running time: 9 minutes
- Country: Canada

Inner City (French: La Cité entre les murs) is a Canadian animated short film, directed by Alain Fournier and released in 2011. Blending marionette puppetry with three-dimensional animation, the film tells the story of a young boy living in a surreal city hung between two walls; with only pigeons to keep him company, he builds strange and fantastical inventions to attract the attention of his nearest neighbour.

The film was screened in the Short Film Corner program at the 2011 Cannes Film Market, and had its official public premiere at the 2011 Fantasia Film Festival.

It received a Genie Award nomination for Best Animated Short Film at the 32nd Genie Awards in 2012.
