= BAM (film) =

- Directed by: Howie Shia
- Written by: Howie Shia
- Based on: Hercules
- Produced by: Maral Mohammadian
- Edited by: Howie Shia
- Music by: Leo Shia; Tim Shia
- Production company: NFB
- Release date: July 20, 2016 (Canada)
- Running time: 5 minutes
- Country: Canada
- Language: English
- Budget: CA$200,000

BAM is a 2015 National Film Board of Canada animated short film by Howie Shia about a shy young man with a violent temper who struggles to reconcile the two sides of his personality. It is a retelling of the myth of Hercules and one of the first films created entirely in 4K UltraHD by the NFB.

The filmmaker's brothers, hip-hop artist Leo Shia (also known as LEO37) and composer Tim Shia, composed the film's musical score and did the sound editing. Shia says the film was partly inspired by their grandfather, a high-ranking police official in Taiwan who was also a calligrapher and poet, "coming from a tradition of learned gentleman who also partook in violence one way or another". BAM was produced for the NFB by Maral Mohammadian and Michael Fukushima.

The film premiered at the 2015 Toronto International Film Festival and was nominated for an Academy of Canadian Cinema and Television Award for Best Animated Short at the 4th Canadian Screen Awards.
