= The Temple (film) =

2022 Canadian short film directed by Alain Fournier

- Film poster
- French: Le Temple
- Directed by: Alain Fournier
- Written by: Alain Fournier
- Based on: "The Temple" by H. P. Lovecraft
- Produced by: Sébastien Bergeron; Alain Fournier
- Starring: Olivier Barrette; Jean-François Beaupré
- Cinematography: Gabriel Tremblay-Beauvais
- Edited by: Alain Fournier; Fred Schmidt
- Music by: Patrick Lavoie
- Production companies: Dock Films; Folks Films
- Distributed by: Travelling Distribution
- Release date: October 9, 2022 (Sitges)
- Running time: 17 minutes
- Country: Canada
- Languages: English; French; German

The Temple (French: Le Temple) is a Canadian animated short film, directed by Alain Fournier and released in 2022. Based on the H. P. Lovecraft short story "The Temple", the film centres on the crew of a German U-boat, who witness strange phenomena before an explosion in the engine room, and descend into madness as the vessel sinks to the bottom of the ocean.

The film premiered in October 2022 at the Sitges Film Festival. It had its Canadian premiere later the same month at the 2022 Abitibi-Témiscamingue International Film Festival, where it was the winner of the Prix Crave for best short film by a director from Quebec.

The film received a Canadian Screen Award nomination for Best Animated Short at the 12th Canadian Screen Awards in 2024.
