= Howie Shia =

Canadian animator

Howie Shia is a Canadian animator. He is most noted for his 2015 film BAM, which was a Canadian Screen Award nominee for Best Animated Short at the 4th Canadian Screen Awards, and his 2020 film 4 North A, which was a Canadian Screen Award nominee in the same category at the 9th Canadian Screen Awards.

Born and raised in Saskatoon, Saskatchewan to immigrant parents from Taiwan, he has worked with both the National Film Board of Canada and PPF House, his own independent studio co-owned with his brothers Tim and Leo Shia. His other films have included Ice Ages (2004), Flutter (2006), Portraits on a Blustery Day (2007), Peggy Baker Four Phrases (2009) and Marco's Oriental Noodles (2017).
