= Linda Ohama =

Canadian artist and filmmaker

Linda Ohama is a Canadian artist and filmmaker. She is most noted for her 2001 film Obāchan's Garden.

== Career ==
Ohama's first feature-length documentary was Obāchan's Garden, released in 2001. The film centred on Ohama's grandmother, Asayo Murakami, and was partly filmed in Onomichi. It was a Genie Award nominee for Best Feature Length Documentary at the 22nd Genie Awards in 2001. Obāchan's Garden also won five Leo Awards including Best Director for Ohama.

Following the tsunami that hit Japan's Tohoku region in March 2011, Ohama began working on the documentary A New Moon over Tohoku (2016), that chronicled the tsunami and its effects. She spent over two years filming the project.

She has also directed the films The Last Harvest (1994), Neighbors, and Wild Horses & Cowboys, as well as two episodes of the documentary television series A Scattering of Seeds.

Ohama is principally a visual artist, whose work centres on her Japanese Canadian heritage.

== Personal life ==
Ohama was born and raised in Rainier, Alberta on a potato farm. Her family lost the farm in the 1990s.
