= Thea Hollatz =

Canadian production designer and animator

Thea Hollatz is a Canadian production designer and animator, whose animated short film Hot Flash was the winner of the Canadian Screen Award for Best Animated Short at the 9th Canadian Screen Awards in 2021.

As a production designer, she received a nomination for Best Art Direction/Production Design at the 12th Canadian Screen Awards in 2024 for her work on the film Fitting In.
