= Pinch (film) =

2019 Canadian short film

- Directed by: Diego Maclean
- Written by: Diego Maclean
- Produced by: Diego Maclean
- Music by: Adam Lastiwka
- Release date: May 6, 2019
- Running time: 4 minutes
- Country: Canada

Pinch is a Canadian animated short film, directed by Diego Maclean and released in 2019. The film depicts a man who discovers a superpower that challenges his morality.

The film received a Canadian Screen Award nomination for Best Animated Short at the 8th Canadian Screen Awards in 2020.
