= Fox and the Whale =

- Directed by: Robin Joseph
- Written by: Robin Joseph
- Produced by: Robin Joseph
- Music by: John Poon
- Release date: September 3, 2016
- Running time: 12 minutes
- Country: Canada
- Language: no dialogue
- Budget: $40,000

Fox and the Whale is a 2016 Canadian animated short film directed by Robin Joseph.

== Plot ==
The short film takes place over what appears to be three or four nights. It features a fox desperately searching across a seaside and through a lush forest for a whale. The viewers are able to hear crickets, woodpeckers, birds, waterfalls, water rushing through a creek, and a storm as the fox wanders throughout the forest. He goes fishing, sleeps in his cave, watches birds, star gazes, and dreams about meeting the whale. There are many creatures in the forest, deer, butterflies, ducks, geese, a rabbit, a frog, and many fish. But the fox seems to have his heart set on meeting the whale. He gets a log, uses it as a boat, and paddles his way across the ocean. When he finally finds the whale, all that is left is the skeleton. The fox touches the skeleton and appears to be saddened as he paddles his way home with his eyes closed.

== Awards ==
The film made the initial list of ten contenders for the Academy Award for Best Animated Short Film, but was not among the final five nominees. It was a Canadian Screen Award nominee for Best Animated Short Film at the 6th Canadian Screen Awards.

== See also ==
- 2016 in film
- Independent animation
- Canadian animation
