= Paula (2011 film) =

- Directed by: Dominic-Étienne Simard
- Written by: Dominic-Étienne Simard
- Produced by: Julie Roy
- Edited by: Dominic-Étienne Simard
- Music by: Ramachandra Borcar
- Production company: National Film Board of Canada
- Release date: December 1, 2011 (SDCAM)
- Running time: 10 minutes
- Country: Canada

Paula is a Canadian animated short film, directed by Dominic-Étienne Simard and released in 2011. The film depicts urban life through the interactions of Paula, a street prostitute in Montreal, with various people in and around the neighbourhood of Hochelaga-Maisonneuve.

The film premiered in December 2011 at the Sommets du cinéma d'animation.

The film won the Canadian Screen Award for Best Animated Short Film at the 1st Canadian Screen Awards, and was a Prix Jutra nominee for Best Animated Short Film at the 14th Jutra Awards.
