= Through My Thick Glasses =

- Norwegian: Gjennom mine tykke briller
- Directed by: Pjotr Sapegin
- Written by: David Reiss-Andersen; Pjotr Sapegin
- Produced by: David Reiss-Andersen; Marcel Jean
- Starring: Odd Børretzen; Sossen Krohg
- Cinematography: Janne Hansen
- Edited by: Simen Gengenbach
- Music by: Normand Roger
- Animation by: Pjotr Sapegin
- Production companies: National Film Board of Canada; Pravda Productions
- Release date: June 10, 2004 (Annecy)
- Running time: 13 minutes
- Countries: Canada; Norway

Through My Thick Glasses (Norwegian: Gjennom mine tykke briller) is an animated short film, directed by Pjotr Sapegin and released in 2004. A Canadian-Norwegian coproduction, the film features the voices of Odd Børretzen and Sossen Krohg as the grandparents of a young girl who is listening to her grandfather tell a story about his experiences during World War II.

The film premiered at the 2004 Annecy International Animation Film Festival.

== Awards ==
The film received an honorable mention for the Jury Prize at Annecy.

The film was a Genie Award nominee for Best Animated Short at the 25th Genie Awards in 2005, and won the award for Best Canadian Short Film at the 2005 CFC Worldwide Short Film Festival.

It was the winner of the Grand Prize at the 2005 Tampere Film Festival, and the Audience Award at the 2005 Animated Encounters festival.
