= Marie-Hélène Turcotte =

Canadian animator and artist

Marie-Hélène Turcotte (1971, Joliette, Quebec, Canada) is a Canadian animation film director and artist. She studied architecture and produced two short animated films.

In 2010, Turcotte directed a short film The Formation of Clouds. It was shown on a number of festivals including the 2010 Montreal Animation Film Festival and won the prizes of the 2011 Filmfest Dresden as the best animation film and of the 2011 International Film Festival for Youth in Vancouver as the Most Innovative Short Film.

Her short film Red of the Yew Tree was aired in the Short Cuts program at the 2016 Toronto International Film Festival, at the Animafest Zagreb, and at the 2017 GLAS Animation Film Festival. For this film, Turcotte (jointly with Felix Dufour-Laperrière, the editor) was shortlisted for a 2017 Canadian Screen Award in the Best Animated Short category. Turcotte herself said about the film that the red berries symbolize the blood loss of women and refers to offspring; the yew was recognized by Ancient Greeks and Romans as a symbol of life and death.

Turcotte said in an interview that after completing Red of the Yew Tree she started to work on a new short film, MC, on a man living in a city.

== Filmography ==
- The Formation of Clouds (French: La formation des nuages, 2010)
- Red of the Yew Tree (French: If ou le rouge perdu, 2016)
- M. Carreaux, (2020)
