= Caterpillarplasty =

- Film poster
- Directed by: David Barlow-Krelina
- Written by: David Barlow-Krelina
- Produced by: Jelena Popović
- Music by: Vid Cousins
- Production company: National Film Board of Canada
- Release date: May 7, 2018 (Oberhausen International Short Film Festival)
- Running time: 5 minutes
- Country: Canada
- Language: English

Caterpillarplasty is a Canadian animated short film, directed by David Barlow-Krelina and released in 2018. Set in a futuristic world, the film takes place in a plastic surgery clinic where advanced new technologies have enabled people to alter their appearances to conform to extreme new beauty standards.

The film premiered at the Oberhausen International Short Film Festival, where it received an honorable mention from the Ecumenical Jury. It had its Canadian premiere at the Ottawa International Animation Festival.

It received a Canadian Screen Award nomination for Best Animated Short Film at the 7th Canadian Screen Awards in 2019.
