= L'Infini turbulent =

Book by Henri Michaux

L'Infini turbulent (transl. Infinite Turbulence) is an autobiographical essay by Henri Michaux about his experiences with mescaline. It was first published in 1957. The revised second edition was published in 1964. The book was published again by Gallimard in Paris in 1994.

The book was translated into German by Kurt Leonard and published under the title Turbulenz im Unendlichen by Suhrkamp-Verlag in Frankfurt. It was translated into English by Michael Fineburg and published under the title Infinite Turbulence by Calder and Boyars in London in 1975.
