= Flutter (2006 film) =

- Directed by: Howie Shia
- Written by: Howie Shia
- Produced by: Michael Fukushima; Howie Shia
- Music by: Howie Shia
- Distributed by: National Film Board of Canada
- Release date: 2006
- Running time: 6 minutes 52 seconds
- Country: Canada

Flutter is a 2006 Canadian anime-style animated short by Howie Shia, co-produced by PPF House and the National Film Board of Canada.

== Awards ==
Flutter received the Open Entries Grand Prize at the Tokyo Anime Awards — the first work from outside Asia to win this award. Flutter also received the award for best Quebec short feature at the Fantasia Festival and a Jury Award from the Golden Sheaf Awards.

== Plot ==
A quiet film without color, a boy and a girl must abandon their friendship to pursue their dreams. In this short animation, a young boy takes a flying leap away from normal, waves goodbye to his classmates, and disappears into the cityscape and beyond. At the same time, a young girl is inspired to reinvent her space with art.

== Production ==
Shia, who grew up in Saskatchewan, was in Montreal when he was approached by NFB producer Michael Fukushima and asked if he had any ideas he wanted to present. He offered a few ideas before remembering some earlier art work he had done of a "kid with wings on his feet" while working with the NFB on his first project, a 30-second short Ice Ages. This artwork became the inspiration for Flutter.

Flutter is animated in black and white. It took Shia and his team 10 months to complete and was animated using Photoshop, which the filmmaker used because of his unfamiliarity with animation software at the time, and because he wanted the film to "look as hand-drawn and gritty as possible."

Several people who had grown up with Shia in Saskatoon worked on Flutter, including his brothers Leo and Tim, who played music for the film, and friends Kelly Sommerfield (background art) and Ryan Patterson (sound engineering).
