= Sosuke the Duck =

2025 Canadian animated short film

- Directed by: Bekky O'Neil
- Written by: Bekky O'Neil
- Produced by: Bekky O'Neil
- Release date: 2025
- Running time: 5 minutes
- Country: Canada
- Language: English

Sosuke the Duck is a Canadian short animated documentary film, directed by Bekky O'Neil and released in 2025. The film documents O'Neil's own experiences in the first year working on her farm, where she had to provide care to a newly hatched baby duckling with special needs.

The film was made through rotoscoping, with inks created from flowers, nuts, berries, and vegetables grown on her farm.

The film received a Canadian Screen Award nomination for Best Animated Short at the 14th Canadian Screen Awards in 2026.
