= Eisenstein (film) =

- Directed by: Renny Bartlett
- Written by: Renny Bartlett
- Produced by: Martin Paul-Hus; Regine Schmid
- Starring: Simon McBurney; Raymond Coulthard; Jacqueline McKenzie
- Cinematography: Aleksei Rodionov
- Edited by: Wiebke von Carolsfeld
- Music by: Alexander Balanescu
- Release date: 2000
- Running time: 99 minutes
- Countries: Germany; Canada
- Language: English

Eisenstein is a 2000 Canadian film about Sergei Eisenstein, directed by Renny Bartlett and starring Simon McBurney, Raymond Coulthard and Jacqueline McKenzie.

== Accolades ==
It was nominated for five Genie Awards including Best Picture, Best Director, and Best Screenplay.

== Reception ==
New York Times reviewer Stephen Holden wrote that the film was "a series of loosely connected (and unevenly acted) theatrical sketches whose central theme is the director's shifting relationship with the Soviet government", and that "as dazzingly played" by McBurney, the title character "bears resemblances to everyone from the punk rocker Johnny Rotten to the contemporary director Peter Sellars." The Independent called it "engagingly irreverent take on an important, tragic story". John Petrakis of the Chicago Tribune commented that director Bartlett seemed "less interested in Eisenstein the filmmaker than he is in Eisenstein the political animal, gay man, Jewish target and artistic rebel", and described the overall result as "a clever pseudo-bio that manages to have a good time as it doles out pieces of the famous director's life". Ed Gonzales of Slant Magazine gave the film a less favorable review, calling it "efficient and concise but . . . lifeless".
