= The Little Ancestor =

2024 Canadian short film directed by Alexa Tremblay-Francœur

- French: La Petite ancêtre
- Directed by: Alexa Tremblay-Francœur
- Written by: Alexa Tremblay-Francœur
- Produced by: Alexa Tremblay-Francœur; Stéphanie Gagné
- Music by: Charles-Maxime Lemay
- Animation by: Alexa Tremblay-Francœur
- Production company: Ha Ha Productions
- Release date: September 15, 2024 (FCVQ)
- Running time: 11 minutes
- Country: Canada

The Little Ancestor (French: La Petite ancêtre) is a Canadian animated short film, written and directed by Alexa Tremblay-Francœur and released in 2024. The film is a portrait of the Maison Bossé, a historic house in the Chicoutimi borough of Saguenay, Quebec, spanning from its original construction to its final demolition in 2018.

The film received a Canadian Screen Award nomination for Best Animated Short at the 13th Canadian Screen Awards in 2025.
