= In Deep Waters =

- Film poster
- Dans les eaux profondes
- Directed by: Sarah Van Den Boom
- Written by: Sarah Van Den Boom
- Produced by: Julie Roy, Richard Van Den Boom
- Cinematography: Sarah Van Den Boom
- Edited by: Annie Jean; Sarah Van Den Boom
- Music by: Pierre Caillet
- Production companies: National Film Board of Canada; Papy3D Productions
- Release date: December 6, 2014
- Running time: 13 minutes
- Countries: Canada; France

In Deep Waters (French: Dans les eaux profondes) is a Canadian-French co-produced animated film, directed by Sarah Van Den Boom and released in 2014. An exploration of vanishing twin pregnancies, the film depicts three characters whose lives have been profoundly impacted by having had twin siblings who died in utero.

The film's voice cast included Fred Bianconi, Denis Michaud, Béatrice Picard and Mathilde Van den Boom in the French version, and Julian Casey, Miranda Handford, Joanna Noyes and Richard Jutras in the English version.

The film was a Canadian Screen Award nominee for Best Animated Short Film at the 4th Canadian Screen Awards.

The film was one of the first short films selected for the National Film Board of Canada's new subscription video on demand service in 2016.
