= Renny Bartlett =

Canadian film and television director

Renny Bartlett is a Canadian film and television director. Primarily a documentary filmmaker, he is best known for his narrative feature film Eisenstein, for which he was a two-time Genie Award nominee at the 22nd Genie Awards in 2002, in the categories of Best Screenplay and Best Director.

His other credits have included the documentary television series Zero Hour, Locked Up Abroad, I Shouldn't Be Alive and Andrew Marr's History of the World.

Originally from Ottawa, Ontario, he has also taught at Vancouver's Praxis Centre for Screenwriters.
