= Chicken for Linda! =

2023 film by Chiara Malta and Sébastien Laudenbach

- Theatrical release poster
- French: Linda veut du poulet !
- Directed by: Chiara Malta; Sébastien Laudenbach
- Written by: Chiara Malta; Sébastien Laudenbach
- Produced by: Marc Irmer; Emmanuel-Alain Raynal; Pierre Baussaron
- Starring: Melinée Leclerc; Clotilde Hesme; Laetitia Dosch; Estéban; Patrick Pineau; Claudine Acs; Jean-Marie Fonbonne; Antoine Momey; Pietro Sermonti; Scarlett Cholleton; Alenza Dus; Anaïs Weller; Milan Cerisier; Nahil Mostefa; Anna Parent
- Edited by: Catherine Aladenise
- Music by: Clément Ducol
- Production companies: Dolce Vita Films; Miyu Productions; Palosanto Films; France 3 Cinéma
- Distributed by: Gebeka Films (France); I Wonder Pictures; Unipol Biografilm Collection (Italy)
- Release dates: 20 May 2023 (Cannes); 18 October 2023 (France); 5 September 2024 (Italy)
- Running time: 73 minutes
- Countries: France; Italy
- Language: French
- Budget: USD$2.5 million
- Box office: $705,616

Chicken for Linda! (French: Linda veut du poulet !, lit. 'Linda Wants Chicken!', Italian: Linda e il pollo, lit. 'Linda and the Chicken') is a 2023 animated musical comedy film written and directed by Chiara Malta and Sébastien Laudenbach.

== Plot ==
Paulette is a widowed mother who feels guilty after unfairly punishing her daughter Linda for losing her engagement ring, even though it was just her cat swallowing it. She asks Linda what she can do to atone for her mistake, to which Linda replies that she wants a meal of chicken with peppers, representing one of her few remaining memories of her father before his death; thus, Paulette sets out, against the context of a general strike that has virtually shut down the city, to buy a chicken to make the dish even though she does not know how to cook.

Paulette comes across a farm with a chicken coop and offers to buy a chicken from the son of the owners, but after she is refused, she takes matters into her own hands and steals one of the chickens. She calls Astrid, her estranged sister, to help kill the chicken, which ends up stressing Astrid out. While making the drive to Astrid's house, she is stopped by the police who perform a search and seizure on the car, which leads to them accidentally opening the trunk causing the chicken to escape. Linda chases it into a watermelon delivery truck, which leads to Paulette following. One of the police officers, Serge, chases the truck on his bicycle and gets it to stop. The driver of the truck, Jean-Michel, offers to bring Paulette and Linda to his grandmother so she can kill the chicken.

Upon arriving at Jean-Michel's grandmother's house however, she informs him that she's never killed a chicken in her life. Serge tries taking this into his own hands and attempts to shoot the chicken dead with his gun. Linda heads downstairs to her friends Carmen, Annette and Afia, whom provide the peppers and additional assistance in trying to kill the chicken. Linda tries to kill the chicken by throwing it out the window, but it ends up getting stuck in a nearby tree. She calls out to the other citizens, who are playing gaga ball, to help them out and they respond by throwing as much as they can at the tree to get the chicken down. The police arrive due to the ensuing riot caused by everyone's help, and after the chicken lands on the ground Linda runs off with it.

Jean-Michel decides to help cook the chicken. Upon returning to Carmen's apartment, they discover that the peppers in the oven have been burnt. Linda is soon reminded of her father. In the end, Jean-Michel succeeds in cooking the chicken with peppers and serves the dish to everyone. Serge decides to quit his job as a police officer and shows a romance with Astrid, while Jean-Michel and Paulette begin a relationship as well.

== Voice cast ==
- Melinée Leclerc as Linda, an eight-year-old girl
- Clotilde Hesme as Paulette, Linda's mother
- Laetitia Dosch as Astrid, Linda's aunt and Paulette's older sister
- Alenza Dus as Carmen, Linda's best friend who looks after her younger brother Pablo
- Scarlett Cholleton as Annette, the girl who lends Linda her new beret
- Anaïs Weller as Afia, a friend of Linda who frequently walks her large dog Zorro
- Estéban as Serge, the rookie police officer
- Patrick Pineau as Jean-Michel, the truck driver
- Claudine Acs as Grandma, Jean-Michel's mother

== Release ==
Chicken for Linda! premiered in the ACID program at the 2023 Cannes Film Festival. It was subsequently screened at the 2023 Annecy International Animation Film Festival.

The film was released theatrically in France on 18 October 2023 by Gebeka Films. GKIDS announced plans to distribute the film in North America, and a limited theatrical release began on 5 April 2024. The film was licensed in Japan by Asmik Ace, and it was released in theaters nationwide on 12 April 2024. In Italy, it was released on 5 September 2024 by I Wonder Pictures and Unipol Biografilm Collection.

== Reception ==
=== Critical response ===
On the review aggregator website Rotten Tomatoes, the film holds an approval rating of 94% based on 33 reviews, with an average rating of 7.4/10. Metacritic, which uses a weighted average, assigned the film a score of 84 out of 100, based on 13 critics, indicating "universal acclaim".

Fabien Lemercier of Cineuropa called the film "a very well-composed feature film which gives childhood its proper place as the creator of healthy disorder, because, as per the song at the end of the film, 'paradise is where you live, where you grow up, where you laugh, for all those lucky enough to be called your friends'."

Peter Debruge of Variety wrote that "Malta and Laudenbach have crafted an entertaining, kid-friendly toon whose power lies less in its plot than the surprising insights into human behavior revealed along the way. It's all the more impressive that animation (as opposed to live action) succeeds in capturing the kind of gestures and details that should seem familiar to any child, from the distorted blur of street lights observed from the back seat to a lesson Linda's aunt gives in shelling peas."

For Screen Daily, Wendy Ide wrote that "The film's initial impact will, however, likely come from its distinctive visual style. Laudenbach's character design is minimal, almost abstract at times. But a few cursory lines and a block of colour – each character has their own specific hue – can speak volumes when handled as deftly as they are here. There's a pleasing textured quality to the drawing style; we can see the brushstrokes in Margaux Duseigneur's handsome backdrops, giving a sense of movement, of vitality, even when the characters themselves are static."

=== Accolades ===
Award	Date of ceremony	Category	Recipient(s)	Result	Ref.
Animation Is Film	2023	Audience Award	Chicken for Linda!	Won	
Animation Is Film	2023	Jury Award	Chicken for Linda!	Won	
Annecy International Animation Film Festival	2023	Cristal for Best Animated Feature Film	Chicken for Linda!	Won	
César Awards	23 February 2024	Best Animated Film	Chicken for Linda!	Won	
Cinekid Festival	2023	Cinekid Lion	Chicken for Linda!	Won	
European Film Awards	9 December 2023	Best Animated Feature Film	Chicken for Linda!	Nominated	
Guadalajara International Film Festival	2023	International Animation Feature Film	Chicken for Linda!	Won	
International Cinephile Society	11 February 2024	Best Animated Film	Chicken for Linda!	Nominated	
Lumière Awards	22 January 2024	Best Animated Film	Chicken for Linda!	Won	
Lumière Awards	22 January 2024	Best Music	Clément Ducol	Nominated	
