= Giant Bear =

2019 Canadian short film

- ᓇᓄᕐᓗᒃ
- Directed by: Neil Christopher; Daniel Gies
- Produced by: Neil Christopher; Emily Paige
- Starring: Solomon Awa; Beatrice Deer
- Edited by: Daniel Gies
- Music by: Beatrice Deer; Michael Felber; Tyler Fitzmaurice
- Production companies: E→D Films; Taqqut Productions
- Release date: March 17, 2019 (Athens Animfest)
- Running time: 12 minutes
- Country: Canada
- Language: Inuktitut

Giant Bear (Inuktitut: ᓇᓄᕐᓗᒃ, Nanurluk) is a 2019 Canadian animated short film, directed by Neil Christopher and Daniel Gies. The film depicts an Inuit hunter confronting a polar bear.

Although made by non-Inuit filmmakers, the film was carefully reviewed by a committee of Inuit historians and cultural figures to ensure that it depicted the story accurately and respectfully. The film was created with a mixture of traditional two-dimensional and three-dimensional animation techniques with real-time rendering technology.

A teaser preview of the film premiered at the Annecy International Animated Film Festival in 2018, before the completed film premiered in early 2019.

The film won the Canadian Screen Award for Best Animated Short at the 8th Canadian Screen Awards in 2020. It was subsequently selected for the 2020 edition of CBC Television's annual Short Film Face-Off competition.

== See also ==
Brother Bear
