= Hot Flash (film) =

2019 film by Thea Hollatz

- Directed by: Thea Hollatz
- Written by: Thea Hollatz
- Produced by: Matt Code; Morghan Fortier; Brett Jubinville; Kristy Neville
- Starring: Grace Glowicki; Christine Horne; Tyler Johnston
- Music by: Neil Haverty
- Production company: Wildling Pictures
- Release date: September 10, 2019 (TIFF)
- Running time: 9 minutes
- Country: Canada
- Language: English

Hot Flash is a Canadian animated short film, directed by Thea Hollatz and released in 2019. The film centres on a woman working as a television newscaster, who experiences a menopause-related hot flash just as she is about to go on air to report on a snowstorm.

The film's voice cast includes Grace Glowicki, Christine Horne, Tyler Johnston, Tony Nappo, Peter Spence and Natty Zavitz.

The film premiered at the 2019 Toronto International Film Festival.

The film won the Canadian Screen Award for Best Animated Short at the 9th Canadian Screen Awards in 2021.
