= The Shadow of My Life =

- Directed by: Hajar Moradi
- Written by: Hajar Moradi
- Production company: VIVIDO
- Distributed by: Canadian Filmmakers Distribution Centre
- Release date: 2021
- Running time: 15 minutes
- Country: Canada

The Shadow of My Life is a Canadian animated short film, directed by Hajar Moradi and released in 2021. The film centres on an artist who is feeling depressed and unsure of herself in new and unfamiliar surroundings after immigrating to Canada from her wartorn homeland, until she finds solace and inspiration in the work of other artists.

The film was a Canadian Screen Award nominee for Best Animated Short at the 11th Canadian Screen Awards in 2023.
