= Beaupré the Giant =

2024 Canadian short film directed by Alain Fournier

- French: Géant Beaupré
- Directed by: Alain Fournier
- Starring: Marcel Sabourin; Fanny Mallette
- Cinematography: Étienne Boilard
- Edited by: Alain Fournier
- Music by: Patrick Lavoie
- Animation by: Philippe Tardif
- Distributed by: Travelling Distribution
- Release date: May 8, 2024 (Sommets du cinéma d'animation)
- Running time: 9 minutes
- Country: Canada
- Language: French

Beaupré the Giant (French: Géant Beaupré) is a Canadian animated short film, written and directed by Alain Fournier and released in 2024. The film centres on the life and death of Édouard Beaupré, a 7 ft 3 in (221 cm) Métis Canadian man who was one of the tallest men in recorded history and who spent his life as a circus and freak show performer.

The film's voice cast comprises Marcel Sabourin and Fanny Mallette.

The film premiered at the 2024 Sommets du cinéma d'animation.

== Awards ==
The film received a Canadian Screen Award nomination for Best Animated Short at the 13th Canadian Screen Awards in 2025.

It was the winner of the award for Best Animated Short at the 2025 Canadian Film Festival.
