= The Great Malaise =

2019 film by Catherine Lepage

- French: Le Mal du siècle
- Directed by: Catherine Lepage
- Written by: Catherine Lepage
- Produced by: Marc Bertrand
- Starring: Miranda Handford; Alexa-Jeanne Dubé
- Edited by: Sophie Leblond
- Music by: Philippe Brault
- Animation by: Agathe Bray-Bourret; Catherine Lepage
- Production company: National Film Board of Canada
- Release date: 2019
- Running time: 8 minutes
- Country: Canada

The Great Malaise (French: Le Mal du siècle) is a Canadian animated short film, directed by Catherine Lepage and released in 2019. A meditation on depression and anxiety, the film centres on a woman (Miranda Handford in English, Alexa-Jeanne Dubé in French) describing her personality and hopes and dreams, initially in positive terms but becoming more tentative and uncertain as her anxieties and self-doubts emerge.

The film premiered at the 2019 Sommets du cinéma d'animation, where it received an honorable mention in the category for Best Canadian Film.

The film received a Canadian Screen Award nomination for Best Animated Short at the 9th Canadian Screen Awards in 2021.
