= Obāchan's Garden =

2001 Canadian documentary film

- Film poster
- Directed by: Linda Ohama
- Written by: Linda Ohama
- Produced by: Selwyn Jacob; Linda Ohama
- Cinematography: Kirk Tougas
- Edited by: Manfred Becker; Linda Ohama
- Music by: Dennis Burke
- Production company: National Film Board of Canada
- Release date: 2001
- Running time: 94 minutes
- Country: Canada
- Languages: English; Japanese

Obāchan's Garden is a Canadian documentary film, directed by Linda Ohama and released in 2001. Beginning with home video recorded by Ohama of her grandmother Asayo Murakami's 100th birthday, the film centres on Ohama's investigation of family secrets that she never previously knew about, including the two daughters that her grandmother gave up for adoption before emigrating to Canada from her native Japan.

The film premiered at the 2001 Montreal World Film Festival.

The film received a Genie Award nomination for Best Feature Length Documentary at the 22nd Genie Awards in 2002.
