= Edmond Was a Donkey =

- Film poster
- French: Edmond était un âne
- Directed by: Franck Dion
- Written by: Franck Dion; Kathleen Fee
- Produced by: Franck Dion; Julie Roy; Richard Van den Boom
- Cinematography: Franck Dion
- Edited by: Franck Dion
- Music by: Pierre Caillet
- Production companies: National Film Board of Canada; Papy3D Productions
- Release date: June 14, 2012 (Annecy)
- Running time: 14 minutes
- Countries: Canada; France
- Languages: French; English

Edmond Was a Donkey (French: Edmond était un âne) is a Canadian-French animated short film, directed by Franck Dion and released in 2012. The film tells the story of Edmond, an unhappy office worker who discovers his true nature after his coworkers play a prank that involves forcing him to wear donkey ears.

== Plot ==
Edmond carries on with his daily routine. He is busy with going to work and living a lackluster marriage.

Obviously not knowing how to defend himself, a couple colleagues at work play a few pranks on him. Sneaking up to him they gently place a pair of donkey ears made out of newspaper upon his head. Once Edmond turns to a mirror he is startled by seeing a full-grown donkey instead of himself. He does realize, though, removing the pair of paper donkey ears makes him “incomplete” again, just the Nobody he is and was at work. Nevertheless, he decides to wear the donkey ears from now on, reinforcing colleagues’ beliefs he was mentally ill. His wife initially thinks it was just a funny, temporary quirk of his, but things get serious as Edmond obtains a tailor-made pair donkey ears made out textiles, including a proper strap for securing the headpiece under his chin.

Seeking company to other donkeys Edmond breaks in into a donkey enclosure in a zoo at night. The following morning he is apprehended and subsequently admitted to a mental hospital. Being subject to electroconvulsive therapy Edmond is forced to learn that he is not a donkey. The treatment seems to be successful: Edmond does not need to wear donkey ears anymore.

His former superior, always having been impressed of his dedication and efficiency, sticks up for him and ensures he can regain his former position at work. At the subway station while on the way to his workplace, however, he relapses and hallucinates the fellow inpatient from earlier who believed he was a chicken. The hallucination begins to flap his wings and manages to take flight. In the subway station the crowds, dubbed with the sound of running horses, stampedes Edmond. Having returned to his familiar workplace, alone in the archives, Edmond hastily assembles a pair of paper donkey ears again and puts them on, ultimately giving him relief. Knowing he will not be accepted by others (the “horses”) as a donkey, he commits suicide by being crushed between two motorized shelves.

The movie concludes with a donkey peacefully standing in a wild meadow.

== Style ==
Edmond is of small stature, in a world of, with regard to proportions, normal-sized people. The only other small person seems to be a fellow patient at the asylum who apparently believes he is a chicken.

Throughout the entire movie Edmond does not say a single word, but communicates through universally understood gestures or looks. There are no mature dialogs, but the voices of staff, Edmond’s superior, his wife, continually comment on the depicted action as the narration progresses.

Most shots are static. The occasional pan, brief tracking shot, or zoom are rare exceptions, the first day of work with Edmond’s new tailor-made set of donkey ears, however, is established with a dynamic first person shot capturing staff’s disbelieving reactions.

All colors were kept low key.

At work everything is in dull gray tones.

The entire staff has dark hair or is bald.

Edmond’s fantasies, however, and people appreciating his dreams show a broader range of colors, without being too flamboyant, leave alone being cartoonish caricatures.

In the living room of Edmond and his wife a small portrait photo of MLK Jr. hangs on the wall, a reference to ostracism as a topic and the struggle of overcoming it.

== Production ==
The film’s French voice cast included Bérangère Bonvoisin, Benoist Brione, Gaëtan Gallier and Patrick Bouchitey, while its English voice cast included Kathleen Fee, Richard Dumont, Kent McQuaid and Daniel Brochu.

== Awards ==
The film won the Bravo!FACT Award for Best Canadian Short Film at the 2012 CFC Worldwide Short Film Festival. It was a Canadian Screen Award nominee for Best Animated Short Film at the 1st Canadian Screen Awards, and a César Award nominee for Best Animated Film at the 38th César Awards.
