= Hollow Land =

- Directed by: Michelle Kranot; Uri Kranot
- Written by: Michelle Kranot; Uri Kranot; Michal Pfeffer
- Produced by: Dora Benousilio; Marc Bertrand; Marie Bro
- Music by: Uri Kranot
- Animation by: Jody Ghani; Uri Kranot; Jean-Jacques Prunès; Inès Sedan
- Production companies: Dansk Tegnefilm; National Film Board of Canada; Les Films de l'Arlequin
- Release date: June 11, 2013 (Annecy)
- Running time: 14 minutes
- Countries: Denmark; Canada; France

Hollow Land is an animated short film, directed by Michelle and Uri Kranot and released in 2013. A coproduction of companies from Denmark, France and Canada, the film centres on Solomon and Berta, a couple who are emigrating by ship from their homeland in search of a better life.

The film premiered at the 2013 Annecy International Animation Film Festival.

The film was a Canadian Screen Award nominee for Best Animated Short at the 2nd Canadian Screen Awards in 2014. It made the initial list of top ten nominees for the Academy Award for the Best Animated Short Film at the 86th Academy Awards in 2014, but was not one of the final five nominees.
