= Miserable Miracle (film) =

2023 Canadian short film directed by Ryo Orikasa

- Directed by: Ryo Orikasa
- Written by: Ryo Orikasa
- Based on: Miserable Miracle by Henri Michaux
- Produced by: Emmanuel-Alain Raynal; Pierre Baussaron; Jelena Popović; Robert McLaughlin; Michael Fukushima; Nobuaki Doi
- Narrated by: Tony Robinow; Denis Lavant
- Edited by: Ryo Orikasa
- Music by: Sacha Ratcliffe
- Production companies: National Film Board of Canada; Miyu Productions; New Deer
- Release date: September 2023 (OIAF)
- Running time: 8 minutes
- Countries: Canada; France; Japan
- Languages: English; French

Miserable Miracle is an animated short film, directed by Ryo Orikasa and released in 2023. A coproduction of the National Film Board of Canada, Miyu Productions of France and New Deer of Japan, the film is an experimental abstract animation based on the poetry of Henri Michaux, which features words from Michaux's work that morph into shapes and human-like figures as an exploration of sound and meaning.

The film has been released in both English and French versions, with the English version narrated by Tony Robinow and the French version narrated by Denis Lavant. A Japanese-language version is slated for release in 2024.

The film premiered at the 2023 Ottawa International Animation Festival, where it won the Grand Prize for short animation.

The film received a Canadian Screen Award nomination for Best Animated Short at the 12th Canadian Screen Awards in 2024.
