= Michelle and Uri Kranot =

Filmmakers and animators

Michelle Kranot
- Born: Michal Pfeffer; Israel
- Occupations: Filmmaker, animator, producer
- Years active: 2001-present
- Notable work: The Hangman at Home

Uri Kranot
- Born: Israel
- Occupations: Filmmaker, animator, composer
- Years active: 2001-present
- Notable work: The Hangman at Home

Michelle and Uri Kranot are husband-and-wife filmmakers and animators. Their best known work to date is The Hangman at Home, winner of the 2020 Grand Jury Prize for Best Immersive Work at Venice Biennale and the 2021 Best XR work at Cannes Film Festival.

== Early lives and career ==
Michelle and Uri Kranot were born in Israel, and both graduated with honors from the Bezalel Academy of Art and Design in Jerusalem. Uri's 2001 student film, Avinu Malkenu, was an official selection at the Annecy International Animation Film Festival. Both Michelle and Uri then attended the postgraduate filmmaking program at the Netherlands Institute for Animation Film in 2005, where their first project together, God on Our Side, won several awards, including Best Animation at Tampere Film Festival.

In collaboration with the Viborg-based animation school, The Animation Workshop, the Kranots founded and co-lead the ANIDOX project. ANIDOX:LAB is a workshop and incubator for animated documentary films and non-fiction narrative works, and was notably the early development program for Jonas Poher Rasmussen's Oscar-nominated film Flee.

While the Kranots continue to produce traditionally-animated films, they have become known for experimental techniques that merge traditional animated filmmaking with virtual reality and other immersive technologies. In 2013, their Hollow Land was shortlisted for the Best Animated Short Film at the Academy Awards, and won widespread recognition, including wins at the Athens International Film Festival, Brooklyn Film Festival, and the Encounters Short Film and Animation Festival. The Kranots also created the companion piece, The Hollow Land Experience, a participatory and immersive theatrical experience based on visuals and themes in the animated film.

In 2016, the Kranots made How Long, Not Long in collaboration with Erik Gandini, and with the support of ANIDOX.

Their subsequent film and VR experience, 2017's Nothing Happens, won numerous awards as a film including at Annecy International Animation Film Festival, and was also exhibited as a VR experience in multiple competitions, including at the Venice Biennale.

The Kranots' 2021 The Hangman at Home was a multi-format project, released as a short film, single-user, and multi-user VR experience. The film is inspired by Carl Sandburg's 1922 poem of the same name, and narrated by Michelle Kranot. The film was honored with awards at several animated film festivals, including a Best Original Score award from the London International Film Festival for Uri's score. The film's single-user VR experience, and the multi-user version called "We Are At Home," won the Grand Jury Prize for Best VR Immersive Work at the 2020 Venice International Film Festival, and the 2021 Grand Prize Masque d'Or at the Paris New Images Festival, among others.

The couple have also announced an animated feature film in development based on the Tom Gauld graphic novel, Goliath & Me.

At the Venice Gap-Financing 2023, the couple introduced Garden Alchemy, their new interactive audiovisual and immersive installation. The project had already won Eurimages New Lab Award for Innovation at CPH:DOX.

== Personal life ==
Michelle and Uri Kranot are married, have four kids, and currently live in Viborg, Denmark.

== Filmography ==
- 2005 — God on Our Side
- 2008 — The Heart of Amos Klein
- 2010 — White Tape
- 2013 — Hollow Land
- 2014 — Black Tape
- 2016 — How Long, Not Long
- 2017 — Nothing Happens
- 2018 — Songbird
- 2019 — Suggestion of Least Resistance
- 2021 — The Hangman at Home
- 2025 - The Garden says...
