= Alain Fournier (animator) =

Canadian animator

Alain Fournier is a Canadian animator from Quebec.

== Filmography ==
- Of Mothers and Tides (À mère et marées) - 2008
- Oko - 2009
- Inner City (La Cité entre les murs) - 2011
- The Weight of Emptiness (Le poids du vide) - 2011
- Broken Face (Sale gueule) - 2014
- The Temple (Le Temple) - 2022
- Beaupré the Giant (Géant Beaupré) - 2024

== Awards ==
Award	Year	Category	Work	Result	Ref.
Abitibi-Témiscamingue International Film Festival	2022	Prix Télé-Québec	The Temple (Le Temple)	Won	
Canadian Film Festival	2025	Best Animated Short	Beaupré the Giant (Géant Beaupré)	Won	
Genie/Canadian Screen Awards	2011	Best Animated Short	Inner City (La Cité entre les murs)	Nominated	
Genie/Canadian Screen Awards	2024	Best Animated Short	The Temple (Le Temple)	Nominated	
Genie/Canadian Screen Awards	2025	Best Animated Short	Beaupré the Giant (Géant Beaupré)	Nominated	
Jutra Awards	2010	Best Animated Short Film	Oko	Nominated	
