= Strings (1991 film) =

1991 film by Wendy Tilby

Strings is a 1991 Canadian paint-on-glass animation short film by Wendy Tilby, produced by the National Film Board of Canada.

== Summary ==
The 10 min. 23 sec. animated short simultaneously follows a woman preparing for a bath and her downstairs neighbour rehearsing with his string quartet, exploring the connections between these two neighbours. The film garnered numerous awards, including the Genie Award for Best Animated Short and a nomination for the Academy Award for Best Animated Short Film. It was also included in the Animation Show of Shows.

== In other media ==
Tilby also appeared in an NFB short film, Wendy Tilby with Strings, talking about the creative process behind the film.
