= Emmanuel-Alain Raynal =

French film producer

- Born: December 4, 1981 (age 44); Nice
- Citizenship: French
- Occupations: Film producer; author
- Known for: 27

Emmanuel-Alain Raynal is a French animation producer, author and gallery owner. He is mostly known for producing the Palme d'Or-winning short film 27 (2023), the feature film Blind Willow, Sleeping Woman (2022), winner of the Grand Prix at Anima Brussels, and the feature film Chicken for Linda! (2023), winner of the Cristal Award at the 2023 Annecy International Animation Film Festival.

== Career ==
Born in Nice, Raynal lived in Paris from the age of 11. He later decided to study cinema at the University of Paris (La Sorbonne). He holds a Master's degree in Film Studies.

After his studies, Raynal became a filmmaker and film producer for live actions films. In 2009, he founded the French production company Miyu Productions, specialised in animation. The company, based in Paris, Angoulême, Valence and Bruxelles, has produced a number of short films, feature films and TV specials and series. Since 2015, Raynal runs Miyu Productions alongside French producer Pierre Baussaron. He has also co-founded Miyu Distributions, Studio Miyu and Galerie Miyu, a contemporary art gallery showcasing artwork by animators.

Between 2018 and 2023, Raynal was the vice-president of the French Syndicate of Independent Producers (SPI).

In 2018, Raynal became a member of the Césars Academy. As of 2023, Raynal is also a member of the Academy of Motion Picture Arts and Sciences in the Short Films and Feature Animation branch.

Raynal is also the author of Domenica, a novel co-written with his father, French author and editor Patrick Raynal.

== Filmography ==
=== Short films ===
- 2013: Maman - producer
- 2016: Dix puissance moins quarante-trois seconde - producer
- 2017: Nothing Happens - producer
- 2018: The Afternoon of Clemence - producer
- 2018: I'm Going Out for Cigarettes - producer
- 2018: Egg - producer
- 2019: Symbiosis - producer
- 2020: Blue Fear - producer
- 2020: Easter Eggs - producer
- 2021: The Hangman at Home - producer
- 2021: Anxious Body - producer
- 2021: Steakhouse - co-producer
- 2022: Bird in the Peninsula - producer
- 2022: Histoire pour 2 Trompettes - producer
- 2022: Backflip - producer
- 2022: I'm late - producer
- 2022: Christopher at Sea - executive producer, producer
- 2022: Letter to a Pig - producer
- 2023: La Grande Arche - producer
- 2023: 27 - producer
- 2023: Aaaah! - producer
- 2023: Via Dolorosa - producer
- 2023: Nezumikozo Jirokichi - producer
- 2023: La Valise - producer
- 2023: Misérable Miracle - producer
- 2024: Society of Clothes (Les gens dans l'armoire) - producer

=== Feature films ===
- 2021: Ikuta no kita - producer
- 2023: Blind Willow, Sleeping Woman (Saules aveugles, femme endormie) - producer
- 2023: Chicken for Linda! (Linda veut du poulet!) - producer
- 2024: Ghost Cat Anzu - producer
- 2025: Death Does Not Exist (La mort n'existe pas) - producer
- 2026: A New Dawn - producer

=== Television ===
- 2019: La vie de château - producer
- 2021: Elliott from Earth (2021) (15 episodes) - executive producer
- 2021: Moules-Frites (TV special) - producer

=== Documentaries ===
- 2014: Le Soldat méconnu - producer
- 2015: Lune - producer

== Bibliography ==
- 2023: Domenica co-written with Patrick Raynal, Albin Michel

== Recognition ==
Raynal's films have received several international accolades, such as the Palme d'Or at Cannes Film Festival for the short film 27 (2023), and the Cristal Award at the Annecy International Animation Film Festival for 27 (2023) and the feature film Chicken for Linda! (original title: Linda veut du poulet!) (2023).

In 2019, Raynal was awarded with the 'Trophée de l'Animation du Film Français', a prize awarded to French animation professionals at the Annecy International Animation Film Festival.

In 2022, he received the 'Prix du Producteur français d'animation' (French Animation Producer Award), awarded by Procirep (Civil Society of French Producers).

In 2023 Raynal was awarded with the Prix de la Personnalité de l'année (Person of the year Award) awarded by the magazine Écran Total.
