= When the Day Breaks =

1999 Canadian film

- Directed by: Wendy Tilby and Amanda Forbis
- Produced by: David Verrall & Barrie Angus McLean
- Music by: Judith Gruber-Stitzwer
- Distributed by: National Film Board of Canada
- Release date: September 5, 1999
- Running time: 9 min.
- Country: Canada

When the Day Breaks is a Canadian animated short co-directed by Wendy Tilby and Amanda Forbis and featuring the voice of Canadian singer-songwriter Martha Wainwright singing the titular song.

== Summary ==
After witnessing an accidental death of a humanoid rooster, Ruby, a humanoid pig, seeks comfort from her everyday life in the city.

== Technique ==
To create the film, directors used pencil and paint on photocopies to achieve a textured look suggestive of a lithograph or a flickering newsreel.

== Accolades ==
Produced by the National Film Board of Canada in 1999, the 9 min. 40 sec. film garnered numerous awards, including the Genie Award for Best Animated Short, the Short Film Palme d'Or at the Cannes Film Festival, TIFF – Best Canadian Short, the Annecy International Animation Film Festival – Animated Short, Grand Prix for short film at Animafest Zagreb and the Banff Television Festival, Best Animation Program. It was also included in the Animation Show of Shows.

It was nominated for an Academy Award for Best Animated Short Film, but lost to another animated short produced in Montreal: Aleksandr Petrov's Old Man and the Sea.
