= Julie Roy =

Animation producer at the National Film Board of Canada

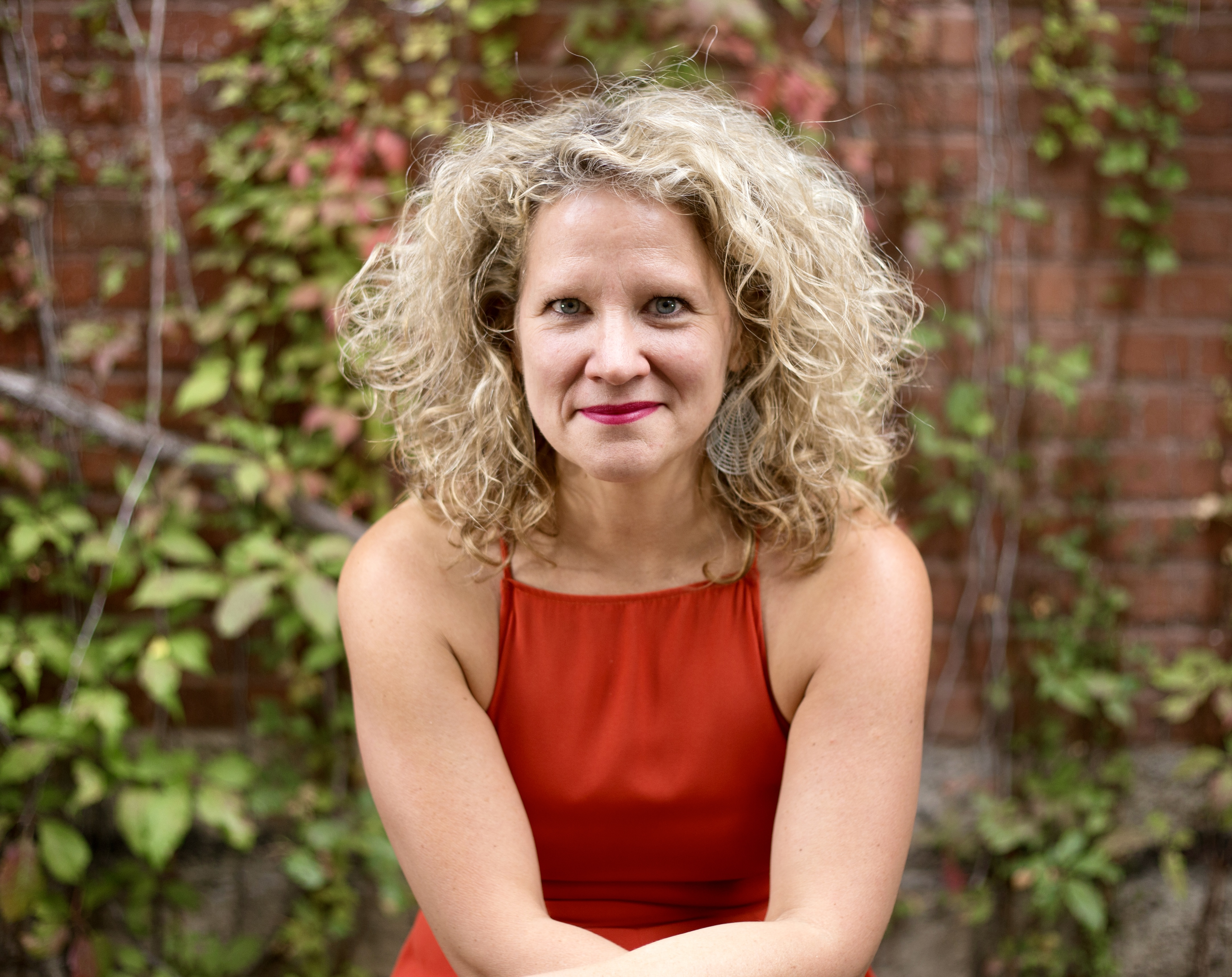
- Roy at the Cinémathèque québécoise, in 2017
- Born: May 11, 1973 (age 52)

Julie Roy (born May 11, 1973) is a Canadian filmmaker and producer of animated films, who has been the head of Telefilm Canada since 2023. She was previously the executive producer of the French animation studio at the National Film Board from 2014 until her Telefilm appointment.

Born in Montreal, Roy won a Canadian Screen Award for Best Animated Short at the 1st Canadian Screen Awards in 2013 as producer of the film Paula. In the same year, she was also nominated as a producer of Bydlo and Edmond Was a Donkey (Edmond était un âne). At the 4th Canadian Screen Awards, she was nominated twice in the same category as producer of Carface (Autos Portraits) and In Deep Waters (Dans les eaux profondes). In 2016, she was NFB co-producer on Franck Dion's The Head Vanishes. In 2017, she produced Matthew Rankin's The Tesla World Light, which premiered at the 2017 Cannes Film Festival.

== See also ==
- René Jodoin, NFB French Animation Studio founder
