= Animation Show of Shows =

Exhibition of animated short films

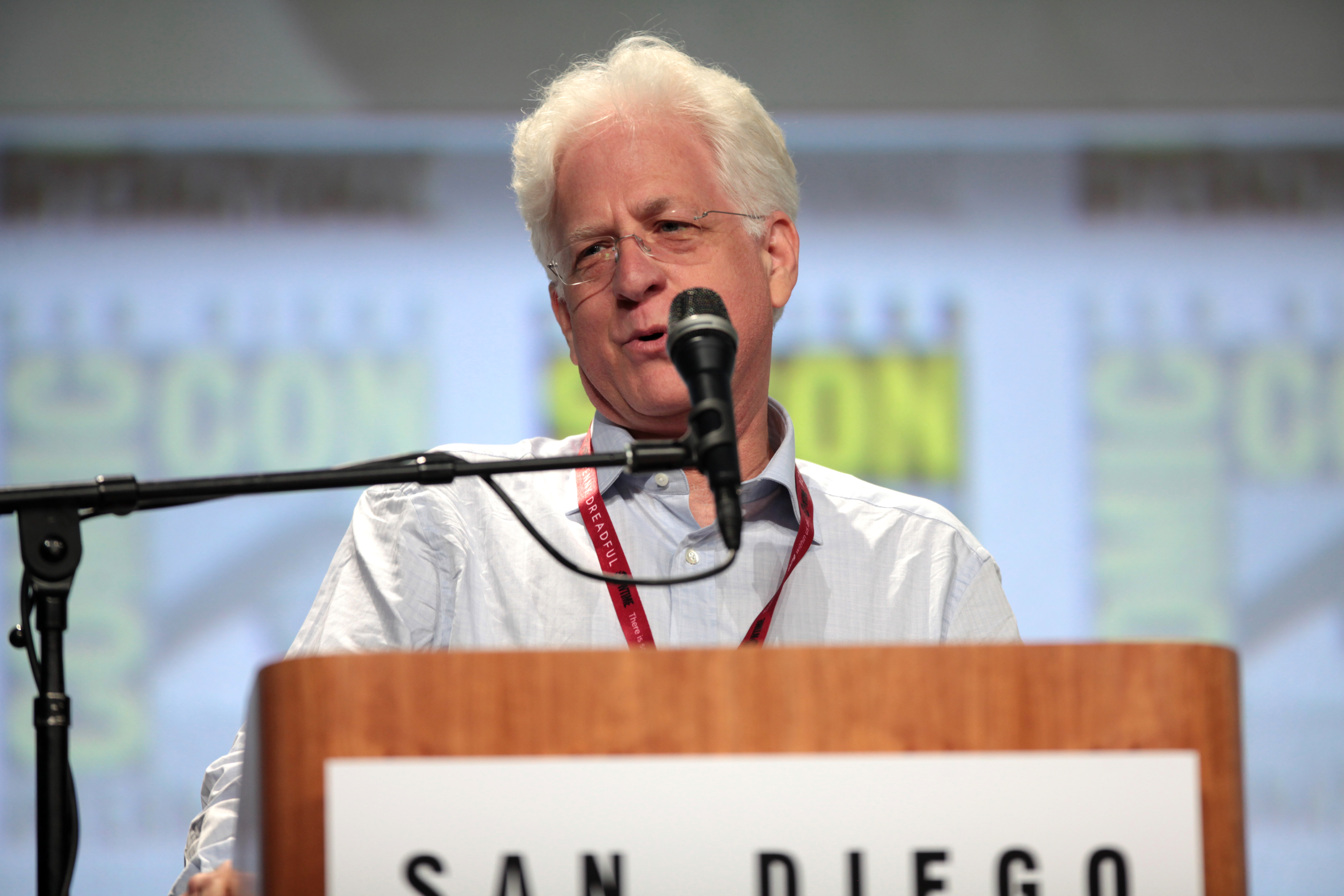
- Ron Diamond at the 2014 San Diego Comic-Con, for "Animation Show of Shows"
- Status: inactive
- Genre: screening
- Frequency: Annually
- Location: USA
- Website: animationshowofshows.com

The Animation Show of Shows is a traveling selection of the year's best animated short films. It is curated and presented by Acme Filmworks founder Ron Diamond. The show began in 1998 with the aim of showing the most original, funny, and intelligent short animated films from all over the world by presenting them to major animation studios, in hope of inspiring their influential animators and directors. Since 2007, a number of the films have been released as DVDs.

== Films included in the Shows ==
=== Notes ===
- ≈ Oscar nominee
- ± Oscar winner

=== 1st Annual Animation Show of Shows • 1999 ===
- Village of Idiots by Eugene Fedorenka and Rose Newlove
- My Grandmother Ironed the King's Shirts≈ by Torill Kove
- 3 Misses≈ by Paul Driessen
- When the Day Breaks≈ by Wendy Tilby and Amanda Forbis

=== 2nd Annual Animation Show of Shows • 2000 ===
- Father and Daughter± by Michael Dudok de Wit
- La Pista by Gianluigi Toccafondo
- Run of the Mill by Borge Ring
- Crime and Punishment by Piotr Dumała

=== 3rd Annual Animation Show of Shows • 2001 ===
- Radio Umanak by Marie José van der Linden
- A Hunting Lesson by Jacques Drouin
- Black Soul by Martine Chartrand
- Aria by Pjotr Sapegin

=== 4th Annual Animation Show of Shows • 2002 ===
- Flux by Chris Hinton
- From the 104th Floor by Serguei Bassine
- Hasta Los Huesos by René Castillo
- Mt. Head≈ by Kōji Yamamura
- The Rise & Fall of the Legendary Anglobilly Feverson by Rosto
- Aunt Luisa by Tim Miller

=== 5th Annual Animation Show of Shows • 2003 ===
- Fast Film by Virgil Widrich
- Cameras Take Five by Steven Woloshen
- Falling in Love Again by Munro Ferguson
- Car Craze by Evert de Beijer
- Nibbles≈ by Christopher Hinton
- The Toll Collector by Rachel Johnson
- Harvie Krumpet± by Adam Elliot
- Destino≈ by Dominique Monféry
- 2D or Not 2D by Paul Driessen

=== 6th Annual Animation Show of Shows • 2004 ===
- Get in the Car by Greg Holfeld
- Lorenzo≈ by Mike Gabriel
- Suite for Freedom by Aleksandra Korejwo, Caroline Leaf, Luc Perez
- The Man Without a Shadow by Georges Schwizgebel
- The Revolution of the Crabs by Arthur de Pins
- Ryan± by Chris Landreth

=== 7th Annual Animation Show of Shows • 2005 ===
- At The Quinte Hotel by Bruce Alcock
- City Paradise by Gaëlle Denis
- Fallen by Peter Kaboth
- The Fan and the Flower by Bill Plympton
- Jona/Tomberry by Rosto
- Life in Transition by John Dilworth
- Morir de Amor by Gil Alkabetz
- One Man Band≈ by Andrew Jimenez, Mark Andrews
- Overtime by Oury Atlan, Thibaut Berland and Damien Ferrie

=== 8th Annual Animation Show of Shows • 2006 ===
- Quien Engana No Gana by Rajiv Eipe, Kaustubh Ray
- The Danish Poet± by Torill Kove
- A Gentlemen’s Duel by Francisco Ruiz and Sean McNally
- My Love by Alexandr Petrov
- Shipwrecked by Frodo Kuipers
- No Time for Nuts≈ by Chris Renaud, Michael Thurmeier
- Tragic Story with Happy Ending by Regina Pessoa
- Lifted≈ by Gary Rydstrom

=== 9th Annual Animation Show of Shows • 2007 ===
- John and Karen by Matthew Walker
- Forgetfulness by Julian Grey
- I Met The Walrus≈ by Josh Raskin
- Madame Tutli-Putli≈ by Chris Lavis and Maciek Szczerbowski
- Some Friends He Made: Molotov Alva Meets the Hobo King by Douglas Gayeton
- Ujbaz Izbeniki Has Lost His Soul by Neil Jack
- La Memoria Dei Cani by Simone Massi
- The Pearce Sisters by Luis Cook
- How to Hook Up Your Home Theater by Kevin Deters, Stevie Wermers-Skelton
- En Tus Brazos by Fx Goby, Edouard Jouret and Matthieu Landour
- The Irresistible Smile by Ami Lindholm
- Beton by Ariel Belinco and Michael Faust
- Administrators by Roman Klochkov
- t.o.m. by Dan Gray and Tom Brown
- Életvonal by Tomek Ducki
- Camera Obscura by Matthieu Buchalski, Jean-Michel Drechsler and Thierry Onillon

=== 10th Annual Animation Show of Shows • 2008 ===
- Keith Reynolds Can’t Make It Tonight by Felix Massie
- La Maison en Petits Cubes± by Kunio Katō
- Kudan by Taku Kimura
- A Mouse's Tale by Benjamin Renner
- I Slept with Cookie Monster by Kara Nasdor-Jones
- Glago's Guest by Chris Williams
- Hot Seat by Janet Perlman
- Presto≈ by Doug Sweetland
- Skhizein by Jeremy Clapin
- KJFG No.5 by Alexey Alexeev

=== 11th Annual Animation Show of Shows • 2009 ===
- Photograph of Jesus by Laurie Hill
- The Da Vinci Time Code by Gil Alkabetz
- Volgens de Vogels by Linde Faas
- Santa: The Fascist Years by Bill Plympton
- Nuvole, Mani by Simone Massi
- El Empleo by Santiago "Bou" Grasso
- The Spine by Chris Landreth
- Chick by Michal Socha
- Partly Cloudy by Peter Sohn
- Runaway by Cordell Barker

=== 12th Annual Animation Show of Shows • 2010 ===
- Coyote Falls, Matthew O'Callaghan
- Luis, Cristóbal León, Niles Atallah and Joaquín Cociña
- Tick Tock Tale, Dean Wellins
- Love & Theft, Andreas Hykade
- The Silence Beneath The Bark, Joanna Lurie
- The Cow Who Wanted To Be a Hamburger, Bill Plympton
- Maska, Brothers Quay
- Jean Francois, Tom Haugomat & Bruno Mangyoku
- Galeria, Robert Prouch
- The Lost Thing±, Shaun Tan & Andrew Ruhemann

=== 13th Annual Animation Show of Shows • 2011 ===
- La Luna≈ by Enrico Casarosa
- Mobile by Verena Fels
- Paths of Hate by Damian Nenow
- Schlaf (Sleep) by Claudius Gentinetta and Frank Braun
- Wild Life≈ by Wendy Tilby and Amanda Forbis
- Luminaris by Juan Pablo Zaramella
- Romance by Georges Schwizgebel
- The Fantastic Flying Books of Mr. Morris Lessmore± by William Joyce and Brandon Oldenburg
- Journey to Cape Verde (Viagem a Cabo Verde) by José Miguel Ribeiro

=== 14th Annual Animation Show of Shows • 2012 ===
- Paperman± by John Kahrs
- The Centrifuge Brain Project by Till Nowak
- Here and the Great Elsewhere by Michèle Lemieux
- Una Furtiva Lagrima by Carlo Vogele
- I Saw Mice Burying a Cat by Dmitry Geller
- The Case by Martin Zivocky
- 7596 Frames by Martin Georgiev
- Le Taxidermiste by Dorianne Fibleuil, Paulin Cointot, and Maud Sertour
- Flamingo Pride by Tomer Eshed
- Daffy's Rhapsody by Matt O'Callaghan
- Oh Willy! by Emma de Swaef and Marc James Roels
- Tentation by Loris Accaries, Marie Ayme, Claire Baudean, and Audrey Janvier
- Tram by Michaela Pavlatova

=== 15th Annual Animation Show of Shows • 2013 ===
- Get a Horse!± by Lauren MacMullan
- Gloria Victoria by Theodore Ushev
- Bless You by David Barlow-Krelina
- Subconscious Password by Chris Landreth
- The Blue Umbrella by Saschka Unseld
- Drunker Than a Skunk by Bill Plympton
- International Fathers Day by Edmunds Jansons
- Home Sweet Home by Alejandrio Diaz, Pierre Clanet, Romain Mazevet and Stephane Paccolat
- My Mom is an Airplane! by Yula Aronova
- Madly in Love by Ikue Sugidono
- Nana Bobo by Andrea Cristofaro, Valentina Del Miglio, Francesco Nicolo Mereu and Lucas Wild do Vale
- Requiem for Romance by Jonathan Ng
- Marcel, King of Tevruen by Tom Schroeder
- Ascension by Caroline Domergue, Florian Vecchione, Martin de Coudenhove and Thomas Bourdis

=== 16th Annual Animation Show of Shows • 2014 ===
- Feast± by Patrick Osborne
- Bang Bang! by Julien Bisaro
- Marilyn Myller by Mikey Please
- Lava by James Murphy
- Me and My Moulton≈ by Torill Kove
- 365 by Greg and Myles McLeod
- We Can't Live Without Cosmos≈ by Konstantin Bronzit
- Duet by Glen Keane
- Hunger by Petra Zlonoga
- The Bigger Picture≈ by Daisy Jacobs
- Hipopotamy by Piotr Dumała

=== 17th Annual Animation Show of Shows • 2015 ===
- The Story of Percival Pilts by Janette Goodey and John Lewis
- Tant de Forets by Geoffrey Godet and Burcu Sankur
- Snowfall by Connor Whelan
- Ballad of Holland Island House by Lynn Tomlinson
- Behind the Trees by Amanda Palmer and Avi Ofer
- We Can't Live Without Cosmos by Konstantin Bronzit
- Messages Dans L'Air by Isabel Favez
- Stripy by Babak and Behnoud Nekooei
- Ascension by Thomas Bourdis, Martin de Coudenhove, Caroline Domergue, Colin Laubry, and Florian Vecchione
- In the Time of March Madness by Melissa Johnson and Robertino Zambrano
- World of Tomorrow≈ by Don Hertzfeldt

=== 18th Annual Animation Show of Shows • 2016 ===
- Stems by Ainslie Hendersen of Scotland
- Shift by Cecilia Puglesi and Yijun Liu of U.S.
- Pearl≈ by Patrick Osborne of the U.S.
- Crin-crin by Iris Alexandre of Belgium
- Mirror by Chris Ware, John Kuramoto, Ira Glass of U.S.
- Last summer in the garden by Bekky O’Neil of Canada
- Waiting for the New Year by Vladimir Leschiov of Latvia
- Piper± by Alan Barillaro of U.S.
- Bøygen by Kristian Pedersen of Norway
- Afternoon Class by Seoro Oh of Korea
- About a Mother by Dina Velikovskaya of Russia
- Exploozy by Joshua Gunn, Trevor Piecham, and John McGowan of U.S.
- Inner Workings by Leo Matsuda of U.S.
- Corpus by Marc Héricher of France
- Blue by Daniela Sherer of Israel
- Manoman by Simon Cartwright of England
- All Their Shades by Chloé Alliez of Belgium

=== 19th Annual Animation Show of Shows • 2018 ===
- Can You Do It-Quentin Baillieux, France
- Tiny Big-Lia Bertels, Belgium
- Next Door- Pete Docter, U.S.
- The Alan Dimension-Jac Clinch, U.K.
- Beautiful Like Elsewhere-Elise Simard, Canada
- Hangman- Paul Julian and Les Goldman, U.S.
- The Battle of San Romano- Georges Schwizgebel, Switzerland
- Gokurosama-Clémentine Frère, Aurore Gal, Yukiko Meignien, Anna Mertz, Robin Migliorelli & Romain Salvini, France
- Dear Basketball±-Glen Keane, U.S.
- Island-Max Mörtl and Robert Löbel, Germany
- Unsatisfying-Parallel Studio, France
- My Burden-Niki Lindroth von Bahr, Sweden
- Les Abeilles Domestiques (Domestic Bees)-Alexanne Desrosiers, Canada
- Our Wonderful Nature: The Common Chameleon- Tomer Eshed, Germany
- Casino-Steven Woloshen, Canada
- Everything-David O'Reilly, U.S.

=== 20th Annual Animation Show of Shows • 2019 ===
- The Green Bird-Maximilien Bougeois, Quentin Dubois, Marine Goalard, Irina Nguyen, Pierre Perveyrie, France
- One Small Step≈-Andrew Chesworth &Bobby Pontillas, U.S.
- Grands Canons-Alain Biet, France
- Barry-Anchi Shen, U.S.
- Super Girl-Nancy Kangas & Josh Kun, U.S.
- Love Me, Fear Me-Veronica Solomon, Germany
- Business Meeting-Guy Charnaux, Brazil
- Flower Found!-Jorn Leeuwerink, The Netherlands
- Bullets-Nancy Kangas & Josh Kun, U.S.
- A Table Game-Nicholás Petelski, Spain
- Carlotta's Face-Valentin Riedl & Frederic Schuld, Germany
- Age of Sail-John Kahrs, U.S.
- Polaris-Hikari Toriumi, U.S.
- My Moon-Eusong Lee, U.S.
- Weekends≈-Trevor Jimenez, U.S.

== Films included on DVD ==
=== Box Set 1 ===
- Gopher Broke by Jeff Fowler
- The Hill Farm by Mark Baker
- The Fan and the Flower by Bill Plympton
- Astronauts by Matthew Walker
- Das Rad by Chris Stenner, Heidi Wittlinger and Arvid Uibel
- Ski Jumping Pairs by Riichiro Mashima
- City Paradise by Gaëlle Denis
- Anijam by Marv Newland
- Car Craze by Evert de Beijer
- Jolly Roger by Mark Baker
- Morir de Amor by Gil Alkabetz
- Cameras Take Five by Steven Woloshen
- Hilary by Anthony Hodgson
- Le Foto Dello Scandalo by Daniele Lunghini and Diego Zuelli
- Fast Film by Virgil Widrich
- A Gentlemen’s Duel by Francisco Ruiz and Sean McNally
- Life in Transition by John Dilworth
- The Revolution of the Crabs by Arthur de Pins

=== Box Set 2 ===
- Badgered by Sharon Colman
- Swamp by Gil Alkabetz
- Nibbles by Christopher Hinton
- Strange Invaders by Cordell Barker
- Run of the Mill by Borge Ring
- Falling in Love Again by Munro Ferguson
- Hasta Los Huesos by René Castillo
- Fallen by Peter Kaboth
- Crime and Punishment by Piotr Dumała
- Get in the Car by Greg Holfeld
- Aunt Luisa by Tim Miller
- The Toll Collector by Rachel Johnson
- Ryan by Chris Landreth
- Eat by Bill Plympton
- Flux by Chris Hinton
- My Grandmother Ironed the King’s Shirts by Torill Kove
- Black Soul by Martine Chartrand
- Shipwrecked by Frodo Kuipers

=== Box Set 3 ===
- Father and Daughter by Michael Dudok de Wit
- 3 Misses by Paul Driessen
- From the 104th Floor by Serguei Bassine
- When the Day Breaks by Wendy Tilby and Amanda Forbis
- When Life Departs by Stefan Fjeldmark and Karsten Kiilerich
- Radio Umanak by Marie José van der Linden
- The Monk And The Fish by Michael Dudok de Wit
- A Hunting Lesson by Jacques Drouin
- 2D or Not 2D by Paul Driessen
- Bob's Birthday by David Fine and Alison Snowden
- Aria by Pjotr Sapegin
- Girl's Night Out by Joanna Quinn
- The Cat Came Back by Cordell Barker
- Village of Idiots by Eugene Fedorenka and Rose Newlove
- In The Rough by Paul Taylor
- Mt. Head by Kōji Yamamura
- The Big Snit by Richard Condie
- The Man Without a Shadow by Georges Schwizgebel

=== Box Set 4 ===
- KJFG No.5 by Alexey Alexeev
- The Sweater by Sheldon Cohen
- When the Bats are Quiet by Fabio Lignini
- Skhizein by Jeremy Clapin
- Guard Dog by Bill Plympton
- Some Friends He Made: Molotov Alva Meets the Hobo King by Douglas Gayeton
- Oktapodi by Julien Bocabeille, Francois-Xavier Chanioux, Olivier Delabarre, Theirry Marchand, Quen-tin Marmier and Emud Mokhberi
- Beton by Ariel Belinco and Michael Faust
- La Memoria Dei Cani by Simone Massi
- A Mouse's Tale by Benjamin Renner
- Blackfly by Christopher Hinton
- En tus Brazos by Francois Xavier Goby, Edouard Jouret and Matthieu Landour
- Overtime by Oury Atlan, Thibaut Berland and Damien Ferrie
- The Da Vinci Time Code by Gil Alkabetz
- Santa: The Fascist Years by Bill Plympton
- Frank Film by Frank Mouris
- The Wallet by Vincent Bierrewaerts
- t.o.m. by Dan Gray and Tom Brown

=== Box Set 5 ===
- Madagascar, Carnet de Voyage by Bastien Dubois
- Ujbaz Izbeniki Has Lost His Soul by Neil Jack
- Granny O’Grimm’s Sleeping Beauty by Nicky Phelan
- Quest by Thomas Stellmach and Tyron Montgomery
- Administrators by Roman Klochkov
- At The Quinte Hotel by Bruce Alcock
- Harvie Krumpet by Adam Elliot
- Camera Obscura by Matthieu Buchalski, Jean-Michel Drechsler and Thierry Onillon
- Keith Reynolds Can’t Make It Tonight by Felix Massie
- La Pista by Gianluigi Toccafondo
- George and Rosemary by David Fine and Alison Snowden
- A Little Routine by George Griffin
- The Lady and The Reaper by Javier Recio Gracia
- Your Face by Bill Plympton
- Bike Ride by Tom Schroeder
- Madame Tutli-Putli by Chris Lavis and Maciek Szczerbowski
- I Slept with Cookie Monster by Kara Nasdor-Jones
- Nuvole, Mani by Simone Massi

=== Box Set 6 ===
- The Danish Poet by Torill Kove
- Volgens de Vogels by Linde Faas
- Vive La Rose by Bruce Alcock
- El Empleo by Santiago "Bou" Grasso
- Strings by Wendy Tilby
- Eletvonal by Tomek Ducki
- Chick by Michal Socha
- Runaway by Cordell Barker
- John and Karen by Matthew Walker
- Sandburg’s Arithmetic by Lynn Smith
- At The Ends Of The Earth by Konstantin Bronzit
- I Met The Walrus by Josh Raskin
- The Irresistible Smile by Ami Lindholm
- Tragic Story With Happy Ending by Regina Passoa
- The Pearce Sisters by Luis Cook
- The Spine by Chris Landreth
- Fifty Percent Grey by Ruairí Robinson

=== Box Set 7 ===
- The Fantastic Flying Books of Mr. Morris Lessmore by William Joyce and Brandon Oldenburg
- The Village by Mark Baker
- Bitzbutz by Gil Alkabetz
- The Centrifuge Brain Project by Till Nowak
- The God by Konstantin Bronzit
- Crossroads (Die Kreuzung) by Raimund Krumme * Galeria by Robert Proch
- Una Furtiva Lagrima by Carlo Vogele
- No Room for Gerold by Daniel Nocke
- This Way Up by Alan Smith & Adam Foulkes
- Journey to Cape Verde by José Miguel Ribeiro
- La Taxidermiste by Antoine Robert
- Crac! by Frédéric Back
- Sunday (Dimanche) by Patrick Doyon
- The Silence Beneath the Bark by Joanna Lurie
- Sinna Mann (Angry Man) by Anita Killi
- Fiumana (Flood) by Julia Gromskaya
- Rope Dance by Raimund Krumme

=== Box Set 8 ===
- The Lost Thing by Shaun Tan and Andrew Ruhemann
- Lavatory Lovestory by Konstantin Bronzit
- Maestro by Geza M. Toth
- The Cow Who Wanted to Be a Hamburger by Bill Plympton
- Guard Dog Global Jam by Bill Plympton
- Romance by Georges Schwizgebel
- Paths of Hate by Damian Nenow
- Divers in the Rain by Olga Pärn and Priit Pärn
- The Renter by Jason Carpenter
- Luminaris by Juan Pablo Zaramella
- Rubicon by Gil Alkabetz
- Flamingo Pride by Tomer Eshed
- Here and the Great Elsewhere by Michãle Lemieux
- The Street by Caroline Leaf
- The Mysterious Geographic Explorations of Jasper Morello by Anthony Lucas
- Logorama by The French collective H5 (Francois Alaux, Hervã de Crãcy, Ludovic Houplain)
- Ring of Fire by Andreas Hykade
- Tentation by Loris Accaries, Marie Ayme, Claire Baudean and Audrey Janvier

=== Box Set 9 ===
- La Maison en Petits Cubes by Kunio Kato
- Hot Stuff by Zlatko Grgic
- Zoologic by Nicole Mitchell
- Let's Pollute by Geefwee Boedoe
- The Case by Martin Zivocky
- Esterhazy by Izabela Plucinska
- Wild Life by Wendy Tilby and Amanda Forbis
- Muybridge's Strings by Koji Yamamura
- Andrei Svislotskiy by Igor Kovalyov
- The Man Who Planted Trees by Frédéric Back
- Every Child by Eugene Fedorenko
- Mobile by Verena Fels
- French Roast by Fabrice O. Joubert
- Jean-François by Tom Haugomat and Bruno Mangyoku
- Passage by Raimund Krumme
- 7596 Frames by Martin Georgiev
- Love and Theft by Andreas Hykade
- Schlaf (Sleep) by Claudius Gentinetta and Frank Braun

=== Giants' First Steps ===
- Shades of Sherlock Holmes by Ron Clements
- Next Door, Palm Springs & Winter by Pete Docter
- Good Old Fashioned Cartoon Violence & For Sale by Eric Goldberg
- Jack and the Beanstalk by Nick Park
- Time for Love by Carlos Saldana
- Fun with Father by Chris Sanders
- Early works of Henry Selick
- The Strange Case of Mr. Donnybrook's Boredom and Mariner Man (with the voice of Bill Scott on the latter) by David Silverman
- A Story and Somewhere in the Arctic by Andrew Stanton
- Early works of Kirk Wise, John Musker and Kevin Lima
- A Birthday by Brenda Chapman
- Frannie's Christmas by Mike Mitchell
- Early works of Chris Wedge

== See also ==
- National Film Board of Canada
- Independent animation
- Academy Award for Best Animated Short
