= Ron Diamond =

American film producer (born 1958)

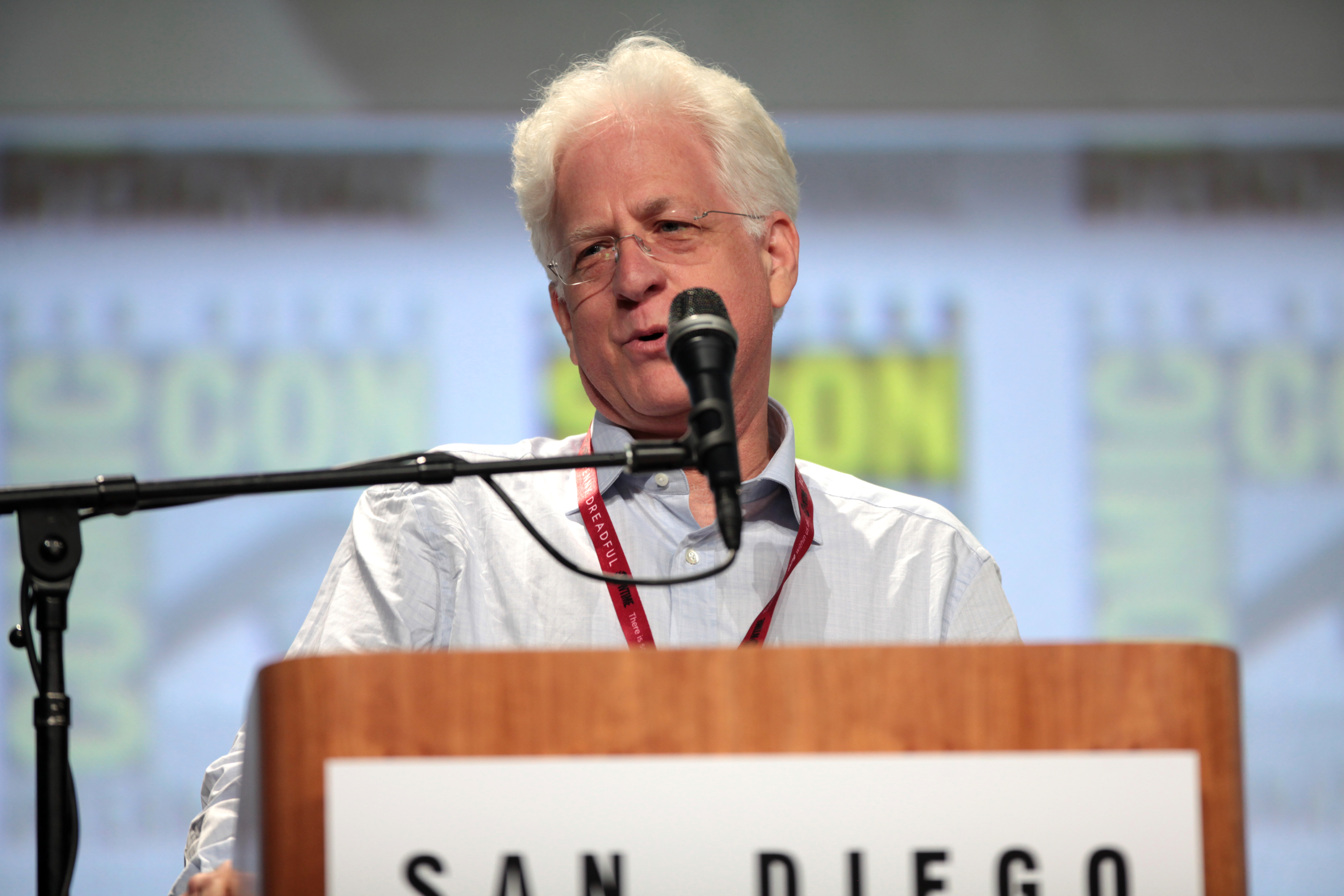
- Ron Diamond speaking at the 2014 San Diego Comic-Con.
- Born: July 30, 1958 (age 68); Los Angeles, California, US
- Other name: Ronald J. Diamond
- Occupations: Executive producer, film distributor, speaker
- Known for: Founder of Acme Filmworks
- Notable work: Curator and producer of the Animation Show of Shows; executive producer of Drew Carey's Green Screen Show

Ronald J. Diamond (born July 30, 1958) is an American executive producer, film distributor, and speaker from Los Angeles, CA. He is the founder of Acme Filmworks, the Animation Show of Shows and the co-founder of Animation World Network.

Diamond has lectured at animation schools, served as a juror and a guest speaker at film festivals. He has been a member of the Academy of Motion Picture Arts and Sciences, Shorts Films and Feature Animation branch since 2002, and is a collaborator with the LA Opera creative team.

Diamond has contributed to the restoration and preservation efforts of films that are in the permanent collections of the Academy of Motion Picture Arts and Sciences, Academy Film Archive, UCLA Film and Television Archive and Library of Congress.

== Early life and education ==
Diamond was born in Covina, California and was raised in Ontario, California. He studied at the University of California, Los Angeles, where he earned Bachelor of Arts and Master of Fine Arts degrees.

== Career ==
Ron Diamond has had two primary producing, distributing and curating careers in live-action film making (1980–1990), and in animation film production (1990–present). Diamond spent nine years producing live action films including, The Chocolate War and The Dark Backward before refocusing his career towards animation.

In 1983, Diamond's first professional producing credit for The Disney Channel was one episode of a series entitled, Future Tense, The Disney Showcase Series. It was composed of two original short films: one film written by Ed Bryant, Prairie Sun and Ron Clements, Solitaire Creature.

=== Animation Show of Shows ===
In the 1980s, Diamond produced and post-produced numerous compilations of short films for festivals such as: the International Tournées of Animation, The Animation Celebration. The Outrageous Animation Show, The Computer Animation Show, Streams of Consciousness: New American Animation, Liquid Television, The Oscar Showcase Tour, and Will Vinton's Festival of Claymation.

In 1998, Diamond founded the Animation Show of Shows (ASOS), a 501(c)(3) non-profit. He recognized an absence of animated short films in the theatrical circuit, "so he set out to curate a collection of new, significant, artistic, narrative and experimental animated shorts from those he had seen during the past year at major animation festivals."

Diamond has presented ASOS and his annual Oscar Showcase Tour to students and industry professionals alike at venues such as Harvard University, DreamWorks, Pixar, and the Walt Disney Family Museum. As of 2020, 41 films featured in the ASOS have gone on to receive Academy Award Nominations with 11 Oscar wins.

=== Acme Filmworks ===
Diamond founded the commercial animation company Acme Filmworks in 1990. It has produced animated commercials for companies including: Levi's Jeans for Women, United Airlines, AT&T, Microsoft, Charmin, Ad Council and the Alzheimer's Association. Acme Filmworks has produced logos and main title sequences including: the Scott Free Productions logo, Universal Pictures' Robin Hood, Disney's The Wonderful Ice Cream Suit, The Path, and Ken Follet's Pillars of The Earth.

Through Acme, Diamond produced the Academy Award-nominated short film Nibbles, and the animated feature film for PBS' American Playhouse Drawn From Memory. He was also the executive producer of Drew Carey's Green Screen Show and has produced segments for the following Simpsons episodes: The Incredible Lightness of Being a Baby, Orange Is the New Yellow, What to Expect When Bart's Expecting.

As an executive producer through Acme, Diamond has been nominated for a BAFTA, an Emmy, and an Academy Award. He has won awards including a Clio and an Annie Award, and has earned Annecy honors.

=== Animation World Network ===
In 1995 Diamond partnered with Dan Sarto and founded the Animation World Network. AWN is an online magazine that covers animator profiles, film distribution, animation studio activities, licensing, CGI and other animation technologies, as well as current events in all fields of animation.

A year after Toy Story debuted, Sarto and Diamond produced their first issue.

== Film restoration ==
Diamond has contributed to film restoration and preservation through Acme Filmworks and the Animation Show of Shows. Most of the films he's restored are at the Academy of Motion Picture Arts and Sciences, Academy Film Archive, and the UCLA Film and Television Archive. The entire Acme Filmworks digital archive is at the Library of Congress.

== Credits ==
Short film commissions
Title	Role
The Animation Show of Shows, 1-21	Distributor, curator and producer
Nibbles	Producer
Bigmouth US Unwired: Woman	Executive producer
Suite for Freedom	Producer
Hair High	Associate producer
Hot Seat, Short	Producer
Good Vibrations	Producer
The Blue Car, Short	Producer
Johnny's Home, Short, ACLU	Executive producer

Television
Title	Role
Drawn From Memory	Producer
Drew Carey's Green Screen Show, TV Series	Executive producer, co-creator
30 Days TV Series documentary two seasons of animation	Producer
The Path Main titles	Executive producer
Re\Visioned: Tomb Raider Animated TV Series, Raising Thaumoplois	Executive producer
Re\Visioned: Tomb Raider Animated TV Series, Keys to the Kingdom: Part 3	Executive producer
The Pillars of the Earth, TV Mini-Series Main titles	Producer
The Simpsons: What to Expect When Bart's Expecting, Couch Gag, "Inside Homer"	Producer
The Simpsons: Orange Is The New Yellow, Cöuch Gag Manual	Producer
The Simpsons: The Incredible Lightness of Being a Baby, "The Extremesons" Couch Gag	Producer

Commercial animation
Title	Role
Woman Finding Love for Levis	Executive producer
Whiskas, Burnt Offerings	Executive producer
Irritability Gene, Starbucks Coffee	Executive producer
United Airlines Short	Executive producer
Weird Al Yankovic	Executive producer
Charmin	Executive producer
Child Mind Institute	Executive producer
PNC Financial	Executive producer
Super Invictus	Executive producer
Hilton Hotels	Executive producer
CVS Brand	Executive producer
Wheel of Fortune	Executive producer
Toyota, Typographers Dream	Executive producer
Janus Funds, Detached Worker Ants	Executive producer
Goldman Sachs	Executive producer
Principal Financial Group	Executive producer
ACLU's Campaign for Smart Justice	Executive producer
Alzheimer's Association PSA	Executive producer

Feature productions
Title	Type	Role
The Strange Case of Mr. Donnybrook's Boredom	Short film	Post-production supervisor
Sorority House Massacre	Feature film	Producer and unit production manager
The Chocolate War	Feature film	Line producer and production manager
The Dark Backward	Feature film	Producer and unit production manager
Robin Hood	Feature film, main titles	Producer
The Motel Life	Feature film	Executive producer and special effects administrator

== Publications ==
- Diamond, Ronald (2019). On Animation: The Director's Perspective, Volume 1. Boca Raton, FL: CRC Press, Taylor & Francis Group. ISBN 9781138066533.
- Diamond, Ronald (2019). On Animation: The Director's Perspective, Volume 2. Boca Raton, FL: CRC Press, Taylor & Francis Group. ISBN 9781138066564.
- Diamond, Ronald (2007-2013). The Animation Show of Shows 9 DVD Boxed Sets, Volumes 1-54. Hollywood, CA: Acme Filmworks, Inc.
- Diamond, Ronald (2016-2019). The Annual Animation Show of Shows DVD compilations, Volumes 17- 20. Los Angeles, CA: Animation Show of Shows, Inc.
