= Me and My Moulton =

2014 film

- Film poster
- Directed by: Torill Kove
- Written by: Torill Kove
- Produced by: Lise Fearnley; Marcy Page
- Narrated by: Andrea Bræin Hovig
- Edited by: Alison Burns
- Music by: Kevin Dean
- Production companies: Mikrofilm; National Film Board of Canada
- Release dates: 10 June 2014 (AIAFF); 3 December 2014 (Norway)
- Running time: 14 minutes
- Countries: Canada; Norway
- Language: English

Me and My Moulton is a 2014 Canadian-Norwegian animated short film written and directed by Torill Kove. It premiered at the 2014 Annecy International Animated Film Festival on 10 June 2014. It was nominated for the Academy Award for Best Animated Short Film at the 87th Academy Awards. Me and My Moulton won the Golden Sheaf Award for Best Animation at the 2015 Yorkton Film Festival.

== Plot ==
Me and My Moulton is a humorous autobiographical short film based on Kove's experiences as a 7-year-old girl in Norway. She is one of three sisters who long for a bicycle. The film explores the emotions of Kove's character, who is often embarrassed by her unorthodox architect parents.

Kove, in a Toronto Star article, stated that the story had been on her mind for years. Her goal was to convey a girl's conflicting feelings about her parents: "These feelings are not easy for kids. It's confusing when you don't have all the insights that you get later in life to realize your parents embarrass you but at the same time you really love them. There are mixed emotions."

== Critical reception ==
The Academy Award nomination was the third for Kove, who was also nominated for My Grandmother Ironed the King's Shirts and her Oscar-winning The Danish Poet, and the 73rd nomination for the National Film Board of Canada. In March 2015, the film was named Best Animated Short at the 3rd Canadian Screen Awards.
