= Córdoba International Animation Festival – ANIMA =

Animated film and media festival in Córdoba, Argentina

Coordinates: 31°25′S 64°11′W

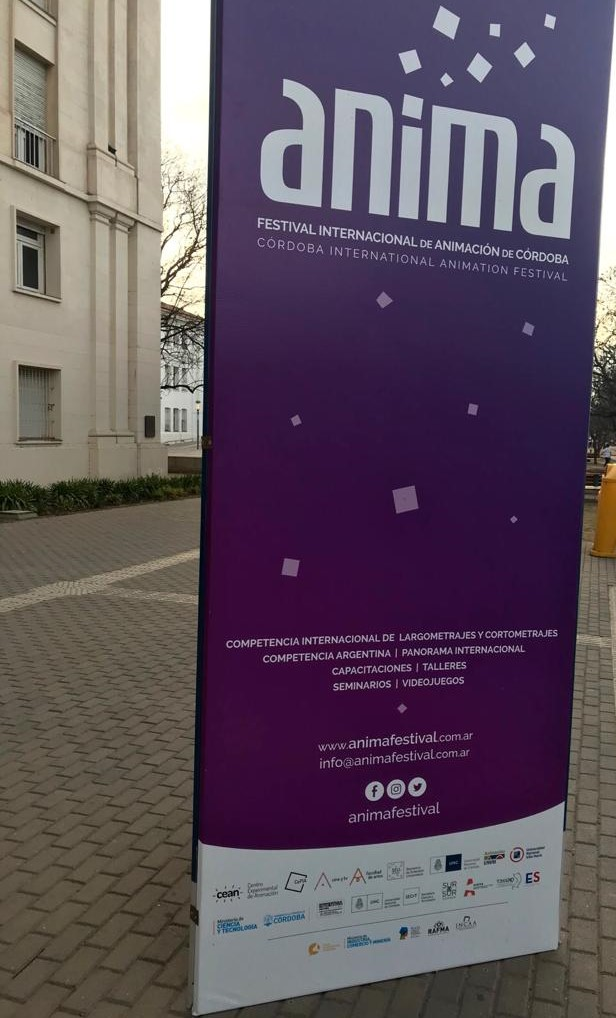
- ANIMA 2019
- Location: Córdoba, Argentina
- Founded: 2001; 25 years ago
- Website: animafestival.com.ar

The Córdoba International Animation Festival – ANIMA is a competitive animated film and media festival held in Córdoba, Argentina.

ANIMA's first edition was held in April 2001, and has been replicated in odd years since, being Argentina's first and longest standing animation festival. The festival is jointly organized by the Centro Experimental de Animación (CEAn), an animation research and production centre at the Faculty of Arts, National University of Córdoba; and the Animation Chair of the National University of Villa María.

== Overview ==
ANIMA revolves around three sections:

- The festival itself, which welcomes all sorts of animation with no limitations to technique, genre, topic, format and/or screening media.
- Formative opportunities in animation, through seminars, workshops and masterclasses.
- An academic conference called FAIA – Foro Académico Internacional de Animación. Established in 2007, FAIA is the first Latin American conference in the field. Proceedings of the conference are published both, on paper and online.

== Winners ==
=== Grand Jury Prize ===
Year	Film	Director	Country
2026	Luz Diabla	Patricio Gabriel Plaza, Paula Boffo, Gervasio Canda	Argentina; Canada
2026	Porque Hoje é Sábado	Alice Eça Guimarães	Portugal
2024	Weeds	Pola Kazak	Czech Republic
2023	Cucumbers	Leonid Shmelkov	Russia
2022	Other Half	Lina Kalcheva	United Kingdom
2021	Bestia	Hugo Covarrubias	Chile
2019	5 ans après la guerre	Samuel Albaric, Martin Wiklund, Ulysse Lefort	France
2017	Celui qui a deux âmes	Fabrice Luan - Vija	France
2015	Beach Flags	Sarah Saidan	France
2013	I am Tom Moody	Ainslie Henderson	United Kingdom
2011	Paths of Hate	Damian Nenow	Poland
2009	El Empleo	Santiago 'Bou' Grasso	Argentina
2007	Der Kloane	Andreas Hykade	Germany
2005	Morir de Amor	Gil Alkabetz	Germany
