= Cameras Take Five =

- Directed by: Steven Woloshen
- Written by: Steven Woloshen
- Produced by: Steven Woloshen
- Music by: Dave Brubeck
- Animation by: Steven Woloshen
- Distributed by: Canadian Filmmakers Distribution Centre
- Release date: March 20, 2003 (RVCQ)
- Running time: 3 minutes
- Country: Canada

Cameras Take Five is a Canadian animated short film, directed by Steven Woloshen and released in 2003. The film is a scratch film comprising abstract improvisational line drawings set to the tune of the jazz standard "Take Five".

The film premiered on February 20, 2003, at the Rendez-vous du cinéma québécois as the preview in front of Bernar Hébert's feature film The Favourite Game, the first time non-francophone films had ever been selected to open the festival.

Gregory Singer of Animation World Network wrote that the film "is the popping peekaboo pizzazz of dots, a firework display, a miniature maelstrom of color. Lines extending, collapsing, tumbling, folding, curling. Greens and purples. At times, it looks like holes are burned directly into the emulsion."

It was included in the 2003 Animation Show of Shows, and was later selected for inclusion on the first DVD release of the best films from the Show of Shows program. In 2006 it was included in the National Film Board of Canada's Volatile Materials, a DVD set of short films exploring the relationship between film and music, alongside films by Theodore Ushev, Anne-Marie Sirois, David Rimmer, Karl Lemieux, and Christopher Hinton.

In 2017 it was included in the Toronto International Film Festival's Canada On Screen program of significant films from throughout Canadian history.
