= Festival du Film Merveilleux =

The Festival du Film Merveilleux (Fantasy Film Festival) is an international film festival held in Paris, focusing on themes of magic and fantasy. It was started by Benedicte Beaugeois and Maureen Gerby. It is organized in conjunction with the Talulah Association. It was first organized in 2010.

== Festivals ==
=== 24–27 March 2010 ===
Jury: Nicolas Bary, Olivier Lliboutry, Lydia Tassier, Philippe Vidal and Williams Crépin

- Best Movie: "Le Portail" directed by Liam Engle (Black Bird production and ASM)
- Best animated movie: "Fard" directed by David Alapont and Luis Briceno (Metronomic animation)
- Best screenplay: "Salut Peter" written by Jean Vocat, directed by Jules Thénier (AQRM Production)
- Special Prize: "Raging Ball" directed by Nicolas Duval (Padma Production)
- Best Pick: "Homeland de Juan directed by Dios Marfil Atienza (FAMU Production)
- Prix du Public (the People's Choice): "Salut Peter"

=== 30 June – 2 July 2011 ===
Jury: Xavier Gens, Caroline Vié, Nicolas Alberny, Fabrice Joubert

Prize Festival 2011:

- Best Movie: Planet Z directed by Momoko Seto
- Best animated movie: Le Silence Sous L’ecorce directed by Joanna Lurie
- Best Screenplay: Junk directed by Kirk Hendry
- Special Prize: A morning Stroll directed by Grant Orchard
- Best music pick: Junk directed by Kirk Hendry

=== 28–30 June 2012 ===
- Best Movie: Second seuil directed by Loïc Nicoloff produced by Tita Production et Zoïc production, France
- Best animated movie: A shadow of blue directed by Carlos Lascano produced by Les Films du Cygne, Animation, France/Spaine
- Best screenplay: Flejos y Reflejos directed by Rioberto Lopez produced by Escalando, SPAIN
- Special Prize: Demain C'est la Fin du Monde directed by Quentin Reynaud and Arthur Delaire produce by Magali film, France
- Music pick: Hasaki Ya Suda de Cedric Ido, composers: Nicolas Tescari and David Chalmin, produce by DACP films, France
- Jury prize: Citrouille et Vieilles Dentelles directed by Juliette Loubieres, JPL films, Animation France/Canada
- Best actress: Leticia Dolera, Fabrica de Munecas directed by Ainhoa Menéndez Goyoaga produit par Jaime Bartolomé PC, Spain
- Best actor: Niels Lucas, L'enclume directed by Thierry Nevez, produce by ASM, France

=== 27–29 June 2013 ===
- Best film : SLEEPWORKING directed by Gavin Williams
- Jury Prize : MORT D'UNE OMBRE directed by Tom Van Avermaet
- Best animated movie ex aequo : LUMINARIS directed by Juan Pablo Zaramella
- MILLE PATTES ET CRAPAUD directed by Anna Kmelevskaya
- Music pick : LUMINARIS directed by Juan Pablo Zaramella
- Best screenplay : SUNSET DAY directed by J.A. Duran

=== 26–28 June 2014 ===
- Strange Fruit directed Noy Hili et Aresay Shimi : BEST MOVIE
- SPECIAL PRIZE for La petite casserole d’Anatole directed by Eric Montchaud
