= Steven Woloshen =

Canadian animator

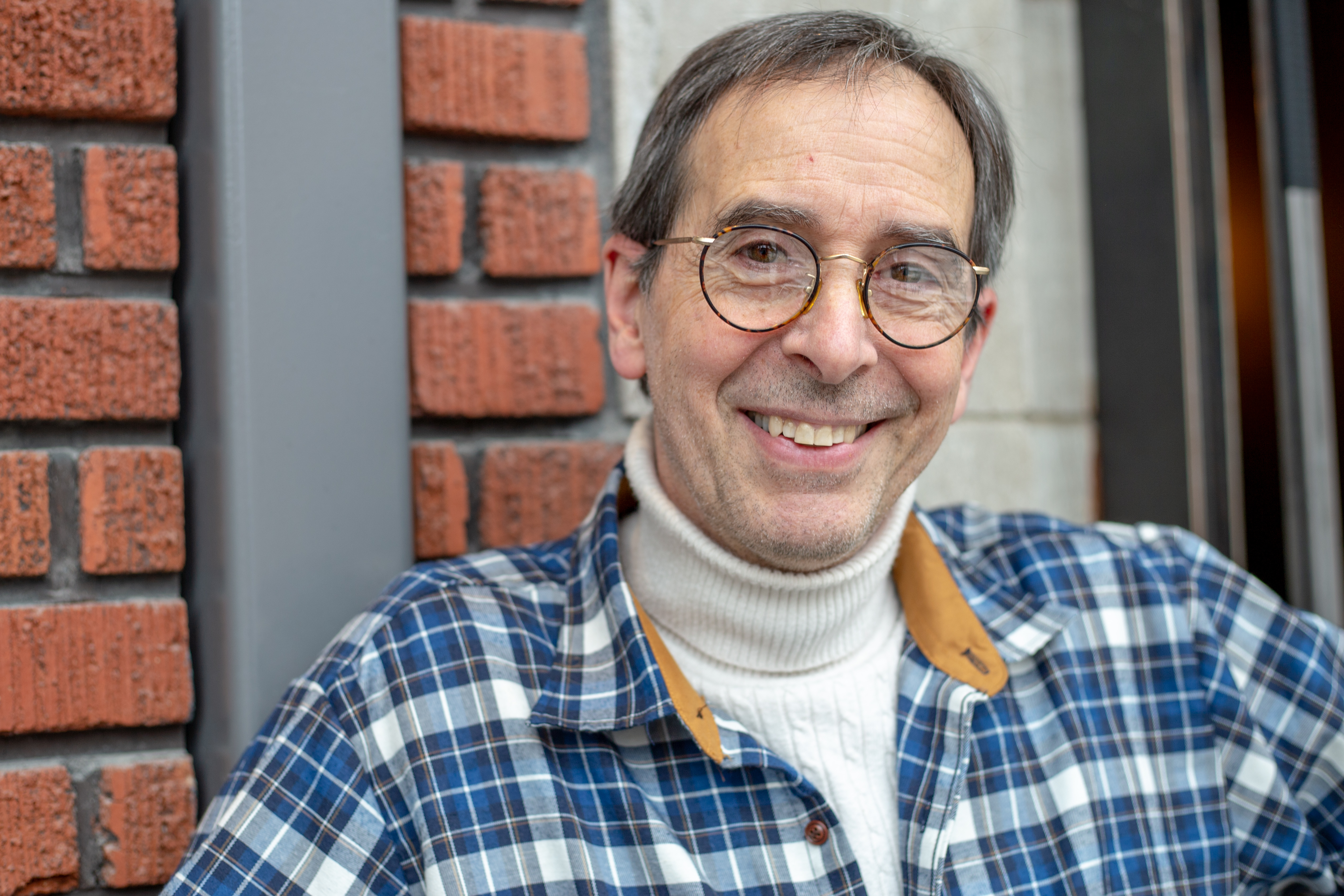
- Steven Woloshen at the Cinémathèque québécoise
- Born: 1960 (age 65–66); Montreal, Quebec, Canada

Steven Woloshen (born 1960) is a Canadian film animator and a pioneer of drawn-on-film animation.

== Biography ==
Born in Montreal, Quebec, Woloshen first attended Vanier College, where he worked with Super-8 film and video. Woloshen specialized in 16mm independent film techniques at Concordia University in Montreal. He initially made documentaries and collage films, but the freedom and accessibility of scratch animation won him over. He has since created animated and experimental films, which have been shown at screenings and festivals around the world.

Working in camera-less animation since 1982, Woloshen has used scratches and lacerations on film to create emotional content.

After taking a hiatus of more than a decade, Woloshen returned to filmmaking in 1996. The years Woloshen spent working on film sets and in labs helped his output: Woloshen’s work “post-hiatus” is more assured compared to his films from the 80s, showing progress in aesthetics, graphic technique and understanding of lab processes.

Since 1999 Woloshen has worked exclusively in 35mm CinemaScope, an oddity in the independent film world that is made possible by his otherwise thrifty means of production. His works have screened worldwide at festivals including the Montreal World Film Festival, Tampere International Short Film Festival, Annecy International Animated Film Festival, Ottawa International Animation Festival, and I Castelli Animati in Rome.

Woloshen was the subject of a retrospective screening at Saw Video Gallery, hosted by the Canadian Film Institute. He is also featured in an anthology on animation, The Sharpest Point: Animation at the End of Cinema, edited by Chris Gehman and Steve Reinke and co-published by YYZ Books, the Ottawa International Animation Festival and the Images Film and Video Festival.

In 2003, his film, Cameras Take Five, was included in the 5th annual Animation Show of Shows.

== Work ==
Woloshen's work is heavily inspired by music, particularly jazz, and with numerous short abstract works in which the images are created in synchronization to a music track. Woloshen's film Me Me Ma Ma (2000) is done in spare black and white. White scratches resembling rubbings, chalk drawings or electronic static jitter across a black background, matched to the driving beat of a techno music piece. Bru Ha Ha! (2002) takes a piece by Erik Satie and translates it into abstract imagery. The deeper sound of a tuba appears in blocky shapes of colour, contrasted with fine white squiggles corresponding to a woman singing. Dave Brubeck’s jazz classic “Take Five” is the inspiration for Cameras Take Five (2002), in which fluid lines represent the saxophone voice, moving over top of color fields of electric blue and green interspersed with playful shapes and doodles.

Woloshen cites jazz-like elements of improvisation and chance as important to his work. Because his films are self-funded and the tools of his craft (film leader, markers, inks, brushes and craft knives) are readily available, he can seize on an inspiration and act on it immediately. He writes: “I think spontaneous urges and desires are the best part of handmade film making.” Woloshen often uses a constructed portable scratch box so that he could do scratch animation during breaks on his job as a driver in the feature film industry.

Some of his films depart somewhat from this method, such as The Babble on Palms (2001) and Two Eastern Hair Lines (2004). The Babble on Palms features various found-footage scenes of everyday life, accompanied by music by Ali Akbar Khan. The outline of a hand appears over all of the scenes, partially blocking one's view. The hand is treated with constantly changing decoration such as dots and spirals, and patterns and colors reminiscent of both the Solar System and cells under a microscope – the universe is contained in the hand. Woloshen suggests his film depicts a thread connecting all people, but also the limitations of each person's viewpoint and the individuality (the “hand print”) that sets people apart.

Two Eastern Hair Lines also employs found footage, and is composed primarily of scenes of two or three people – a man and woman in a room together, two men seated across a desk from one another, a couple seated side-by-side. Parts of the images are framed, blocked out, or painted over, dividing and isolating the figures from each other. Set against a 1939 Chinese recording, “Parting at Yang Kwan,” Two Eastern Hair Lines is full of longing. It reflects on the unbridgeable distance between people and the difficulties of communication. As Woloshen writes in his description, “Sometimes the rifts between us are as wide as rivers, and sometimes as small as hair lines.”

He has been a five-time Jutra/Iris award nominee for Best Animated Short Film, receiving nods at the 6th Jutra Awards in 2004 for Two Eastern Hair Lines, the 8th Jutra Awards in 2006 for The Curse of the Voodoo Child, the 12th Jutra Awards in 2010 for Playtime, the 19th Quebec Cinema Awards in 2019 for Casino, and the 22nd Quebec Cinema Awards in 2020 for Organic.

== Writing ==
2010 "Recipes for Reconstruction" Scratchatopia Books. Montreal ISBN 978-0-9866231-1-0

2015 "Scratch, Crackle & Pop" Scratchatopia Books. Montreal ISBN 978-0-9866231-2-7

== Filmography ==
- Son of Dada 1982. 16mm. sound.
- Didre Novo 1983. 16mm sound.
- Pepper Steak 1984. 16mm. sound.
- Get Happy 1999. 35mm. sound. CinemaScope
- MeMeMaMa 2000. 35mm. sound.
- Ditty Dot Comma 2001. 35mm. sound. CinemaScope
- Bru Ha Ha! 2002 35mm . sound
- Cameras Take Five 2003. 35mm. sound. Featured music by Dave Brubeck. CinemaScope
- The Babble on Palms 2002 35mm. sound
- SNIP 2004. 35mm. sound. Featured music by Fats Waller. CinemaScope
- Minuet 2003 35mm . sound
- Two Eastern Hair Lines 2002 35mm . sound
- Rebuttal 2005 35mm . sound
- The Curse of The Voodoo Child 2005. 35mm. sound . CinemaScope
- Changing Evan 2003. 35mm. sound. Featured music by Count Basie. CinemaScope
- Phont Cycle 2006 35mm . sound
- Shimmer Box Drive 2007. 35mm. sound. Featured music by Buddy Rich. CinemaScope
- RH Factor 2008 35mm . sound
- Chronicle Reconstructions 2008 35mm . sound
- Zero Visibility 2008 35mm . sound
- Scrapbook 2008 35mm . silent
- The Homestead Act 2009 35mm . sound
- Fleeing Rotland 2009 35mm . sound
- Vista 2008 35mm . silent in VistaVision
- Playtime 2009. 35mm. sound . Featured music by Oscar Peterson. CinemaScope. Tribute to the paintings of Canadian Painters Eleven esp. Jock Macdonald.
- The Rosetta Stone 2010 35mm . sound
- 2010 Melbourne International Animation Festival Trailer 2010 35mm . sound
- Fiesta Brava 2011 35mm . sound
- Visual Music for Ten Voices 2011 35mm . silent
- When the Sun Turns into Juice 2011 35mm . sound
- Free Jafar 2012 35mm . sound
- Frobisher Bay 2013 35mm . sound
- National tapestry 2012 35mm . silent
- 1000 Plateaus (2004 - 2014) 2014 35mm . sound
- Implosion 2016 35mm . sound
- Casino 2016 35mm . sound
- National Tapestry 2017
- This shadow, over each departure 2018
- The Dead Sea Scrolls 2018
- Objects Within 2018
- Father Knows Father Best 2018
- Uprising 2019
- Organic 2019
- The Zolle Suite 2021
- Perf Dance 2022
- Orbiter 2023
