= Simprovised =

- The Simpsons episode
- Episode no.: Season 27; Episode 21
- Directed by: Matthew Nastuk
- Written by: John Frink
- Production code: VABF13
- Original air date: May 15, 2016

Episode chronology
← Previous "To Courier with Love"	Next → "Orange Is the New Yellow"
- The Simpsons season 27

"Simprovised" is the twenty-first episode of the twenty-seventh season of the American animated television series The Simpsons, and the 595th episode of the series overall. The episode was directed by Matthew Nastuk and written by John Frink. It aired in the United States on Fox on May 15, 2016, and includes a three-minute live-animated segment in which viewers were able to ask Homer Simpson questions.

In this episode, Homer develops a fear of public speaking, so he takes a improvisation class while Bart destroys his treehouse after learning Ralph has a better one. The episode received mixed reviews.

== Plot ==
Homer is going to make an annual speech at the Nuclear Plant. His original plan is to repeat the comedy speech he did every year, but most of his punchlines have already been used or are incredibly offensive, including jokes about Lenny's grandmother who is sick. This makes him so nervous that he passes out on-stage, causing him to develop glossophobia and start hallucinating his household appliances mocking him.

In an attempt to calm Homer down, Marge takes him to a standup comedy show, where he is amazed by the actors' talent to improvise. He, Lenny and Carl then decide to join an improvisation class, where Homer learns that he has a talent for improvising scenes. They decide to form their own stand-up comedy troupe at Moe's Tavern, where Homer's act is acclaimed by the public and the critics.

In a secondary plot, Bart and Lisa go to Ralph's birthday party, where Bart realizes that Ralph's new treehouse (built with bribe money Chief Wiggum took from the evidence locker) is much better than his old current treehouse. Feeling envious, Bart destroys his treehouse. However, when he says that mothers cannot build a treehouse, Marge plans to work hard and build him the best treehouse she can.

Later, after Bart's new treehouse is completed, Marge overhears him saying to Milhouse that there is no need to thank her because she was only doing her job. Marge gets irritated at him, and storms off during dinner when Bart offends her. Homer learns that he has been invited to perform at the Springfield Fringe Festival. When Marge complains to him about Bart and learns about the fringe festival, she accidentally causes Homer's glossophobia to come back.

The next morning, Bart takes Marge's breakfast into her bedroom and apologizes (with Homer's help), and they reconcile. Later at the festival, Moe convinces an anxious Homer to cheat his way through his improvisation act, letting Moe pick his premises. However, Lisa finds out about Moe's plan and convinces Homer to make his show the proper way. He does so, and his on-the-spot act is well-received by the audience.

== Homer Live ==
A Homer live segment was considered as early as 2007, as a potential promotion for The Simpsons Movie on The Tonight Show, but was ultimately decided against. After "Simprovised" episode writer John Frink proposed the idea for Homer to do "improv for real" at the end of the episode, the crew reassessed the quality of motion capture technology compared to 2007. Looking into how Fox Sports' on-air graphics division was handling live animation for the Cleatus mascot character led to Adobe Character Animator, a feature in Adobe After Effects being chosen for the live segment. As Adobe Character Animator was in a preview state at the time, a special version of the Preview 4 branch was made for use by the show.

Dan Castellaneta handled the voiceover with the animation done via Adobe Character Animator, which allowed for real-time lip sync and keyboard triggered animation. Simpsons director David Silverman handled on-air animation control for the character, due to his experience on the show and establishing the rules on how Homer acts. Simpsons writers pre-screened questions used on-air and also answered questions as Homer on Facebook and Twitter parallel to Castellaneta's improvisation on the live broadcast. As a means of verifying the real-time nature of the show, then-recent events were worked into the segment, with Homer making jokes about Drake's appearance on Saturday Night Live on the East Coast feed and a fight during a Toronto Blue Jays vs Texas Rangers game on the West Coast feed. While the segment was repeated twice for the US television airing, the international feed used a pre-recorded segment.

== Reception ==
"Simprovised" scored a 1.2 rating and was watched by 2.80 million viewers, making it Fox's highest rated show of the night.

Dennis Perkins of The A.V. Club was positive on "Simprovised", giving it a B+. He explained "What’s so entertaining about Homer’s journey in 'Simprovised' is how it grows out of his character. Sure, the episode is pretty streamlined, since those last three minutes were set aside for the big ratings-grab, but lopping off the opening credits entirely helped. There’s even time for a truncated but effective B-story, with Marge getting pissed at Bart for not appreciating her building him a new treehouse. Honestly, underdeveloped, gag-happy storylines are a sad fact of life in modern-day 'Simpsons' but 'Simprovised' proves that—even when compressed—a simple story well told and rooted in the characters can be both funny and affecting."

IGN reviewer Jesse Schedeen gave the episode a 6.4/10. He criticized the episode itself, but enjoyed the improvised part, adding "For the most part, this episode was very textbook, late-era Simpsons fare. There were some humor to be had (mainly in the first act), but mostly a lot of missed opportunities and well-worn Simpson family drama. However, the live segment that closed out the episode was definitely a welcome change from the norm. That segment proved that this show still can take risks from time to time, and furthermore, that those risks can pay off."

Tony Sokol of Den of Geek was critical, giving the episode 2.5/5 stars, writing "The episode moved, but for a comedy show doing a show about comedy, the laughs were slim."
