= Emud Mokhberi =

Iranian-American film director (born 1978)

- Born: February 1978 (age 48); Michigan, U.S.
- Education: University of California, Los Angeles; Gobelins, l'École de l'image
- Occupations: Film director; animator; writer
- Known for: Oktapodi
- Awards: Academy Award for Best Animated Short Film nomination (2009)
- Website: emud.org

Emud Mokhberi (born February 1978, Michigan) is an Iranian-American film director. In 2009, he was nominated for an Academy Award for Best Animated Short Film for Oktapodi. Oktapodi was also included in the Animation Show of Shows.

After a childhood spent in Tehran and Stockholm, Emud Mokhberi moved to Southern California in 1993 and shortly thereafter started his studies at the University of California, Los Angeles. After returning to UCLA for a master's degree in computer graphics, he was introduced to animation and subsequently studied film at the UCLA School of Film, Theater, and Television and Gobelins, l'école de l'image in Paris, France. In 2007, he directed Oktapodi with five other students at Gobelins: Julien Bocabeille, François-Xavier Chanioux, Olivier Delabarre, Quentin Marmier, and Thierry Marchand.

== Filmography ==
- Oktapodi (2007) (writer, director)
