= Cordell Barker =

Canadian animator

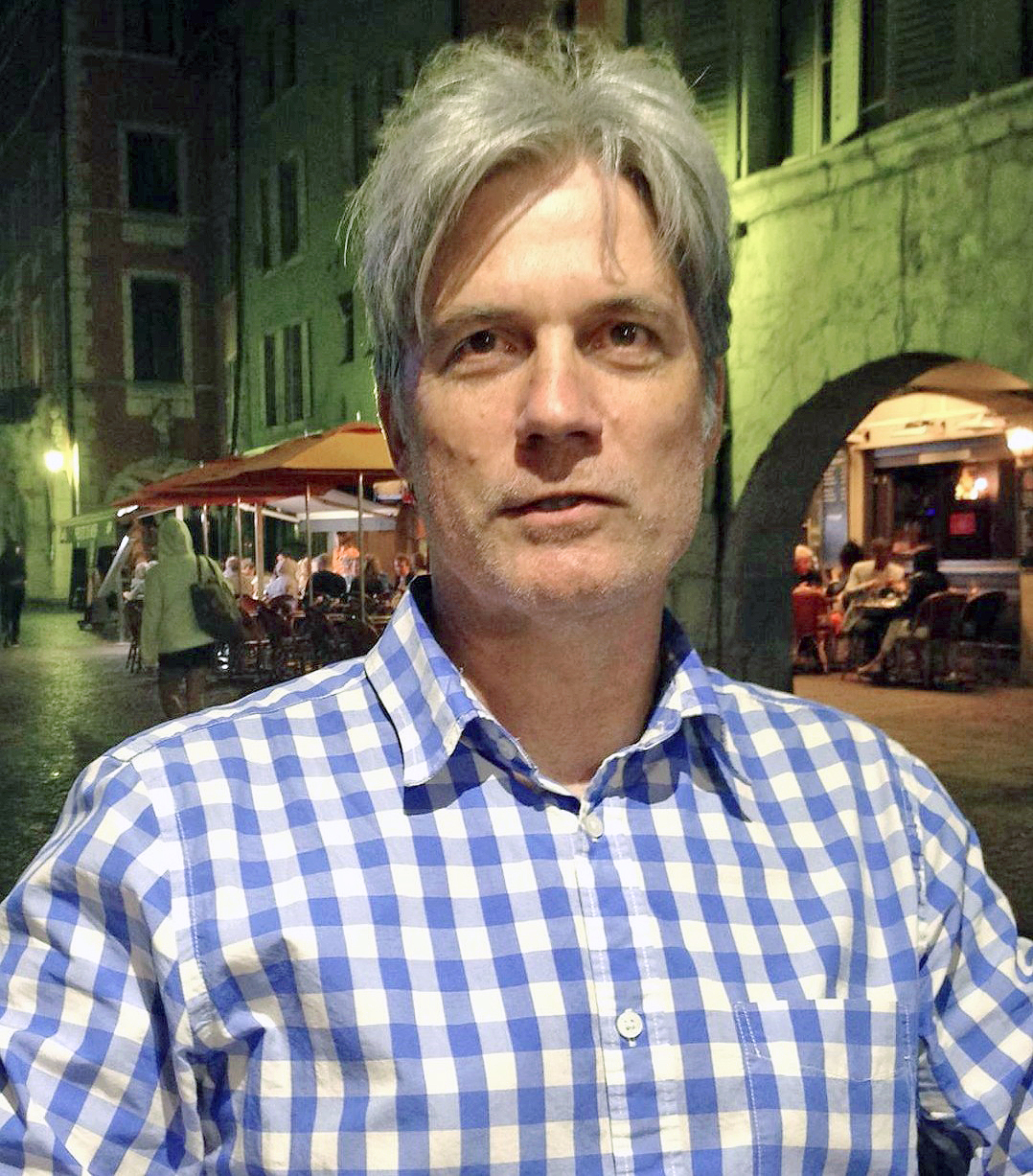
- Born: Cordell Barker; September 10, 1956 (age 70); Winnipeg, Manitoba, Canada
- Occupations: Animator; director; screenwriter
- Years active: 1987–present

Cordell Barker (born 1956) is a Canadian animator, director and screenwriter based in Winnipeg, Manitoba. He began animating in his late teens after taking on an apprenticeship at Kenn Perkins Animation. A two-time Academy Award nominee, Barker is an animation filmmaker with the National Film Board of Canada (NFB).

== National Film Board of Canada ==
Earlier in his career, Barker did animation work on fellow Winnipeg animator Brad Caslor's NFB short, Get a Job. He then went on to direct his own NFB animated shorts, at the NFB's Winnipeg studio. His best known NFB shorts are The Cat Came Back (1988) and Strange Invaders (2002), both of which received Oscar nominations.

He completed his third film for the NFB, Runaway, in 2009. Runaway was named best animated film at the 30th Genie Awards. Strange Invaders, The Cat Came Back and Runaway were included in the Animation Show of Shows.

In April 2010, he was hired as a creative consultant by the NFB to oversee its animation projects from the Canadian Prairies, Northwest Territories and Nunavut.

=== If I Was God... ===
Barker's fourth film with the NFB is If I Was God..., a 3D film about a 12-year-old boy speculating on what he would do if he was God. The film is inspired by Barker's experiences as a 12-year-old in grade seven, dissecting and experimenting on a frog in biology class, and sensing the approaching power of adulthood after having left the confines of elementary school. Barker intends to experiment with a variety of animation techniques in this film, use stop-motion puppets along with traditional animation and other forms. The film is divided into episodes, with each sequence triggered by mental associations of typical grade seven classroom objects, such as science posters, dioramas and papier-mâché volcanoes. The director had initially contemplated also using CGI animation but abandoned the idea out of a desire to achieve an “organic hand-made feel” for the film. Barker was committed to completing the film with a much shorter production schedule than his previous works, which averaged “a disturbing and embarrassing 8½ years per film.” In November 2015, the Academy of Motion Picture Arts and Sciences announced that If I Was God... was one of 10 films—and two NFB productions—shortlisted for a possible Oscar nomination, however the film didn't receive a nomination.

== Short films ==
- The Cat Came Back (1988)
- Strange Invaders (2001)
- Runaway (2009)
- If I Was God... (2015)
- Good Luck to You All (2025)
- The Anta Claus of the South Pole (2026)

== Commercial work ==
He has also worked on commercial campaigns for entities such as KFC, Coca-Cola, Benylin, Bell Canada, Lors, Nike, and the Government of Canada and Sesame Street.
