= Oktapodi =

- Theatrical poster
- Directed by: Julien Bocabeille; François-Xavier Chanioux; Olivier Delabarre; Thierry Marchand; Quentin Marmier; Emud Mokhberi
- Produced by: Marie-France Zumofen
- Music by: Kenny Wood
- Production company: Gobelins L'Ecole de L'Image
- Distributed by: Talantis Films
- Release date: June 2007
- Running time: 2 minutes 26 seconds
- Country: France
- Language: French

Oktapodi is a 2007 French animated short film that originated as a Graduate Student Project from Gobelins L'Ecole de L'Image. The film is about a pair of lovestruck octopuses who, through a series of comical events, are separated and must find each other. Oktapodi was directed by Julien Bocabeille, François-Xavier Chanioux, Olivier Delabarre, Thierry Marchand, Quentin Marmier, and Emud Mokhberi. Music was composed by Kenny Wood.

Oktapodi was well received, winning a number of awards, as well as an Academy Award nomination for Best Short Film (Animated) for the 81st Academy Awards. It was also included in the Animation Show of Shows.

== Plot ==
Two octopuses fight for their lives with a stubborn restaurant cook in a comical escape through the streets of a seaside town in Greece.

== Awards and nominations ==
Award	Category	Recipient	Result
Academy Awards	Short Film (Animated)	Emud Mokhberi & Thierry Marchand	Nominated
Anima Mundi	Best Character Animation	Gobelins, l'école de l'image, France	Won
AniWOW!	Best Character Animation	Gobelins, l'école de l'image, France	Won
Annecy International Animated Film Festival	Canal+Family Award (Student Film)	Julien Bocabeille	Won
Festival International du Film de l'Etudiant (Casablanca International Student Film Festival)	Best Animated Film	Julien Bocabeille	Won
Hiroshima International Animation Festival	Special International Jury Prize	Gobelins, l'école de l'image, France	Won
SIGGRAPH	Best of Show	Gobelins, l'école de l'image, France	Won
SIGGRAPH	Audience Prize	Gobelins, l'école de l'image, France	Won
Zagreb World Festival of Animated Films	Children's Jury Award - Special Distinction	Julien Bocabeille	Won

== Legacy ==
The Academy Film Archive preserved the film under the ACME Filmworks collection.

== See also ==
- Le Building - a 2005 animated short film, also directed by students at Gobelins
