= Thomas Stellmach =

German film director (born 1965)

- Born: 1965; Straubing
- Occupation: Film producer

Thomas Stellmach (born 1965 in Straubing, West Germany) is a German animated film producer and director. Stellmach has received many awards including the Academy Award for Best Animated Short Film for his 1996 film Quest.

Stellmach studied at the Department of Animation at the University of Kassel Art College in Germany, being taught by the well-known artist Paul Driessen. Having received his Degree of Arts in 1999 Stellmach founded the animation studio Lichthof, Film & Animation in Kassel with two partners and produced animation films for television and advertising. He has handed off his share of the company to focus on artistic animation projects since 2009. His field of experience contains computer animation, stop motion, animated cartoon and pixilation. Stellmach directed the animated experimental film Virtuos Virtuell with the artist Maja Oschmann to the overture of Louis Spohr's opera The Alchymist in stereoscopic.

So far he hold workshops at various academies, e.g.

- 2002 - now: annual animation workshop with the prize winners of the International Competition for Youths, youth creativ’ by the association of the German Volks- u. Raiffeisenbanken, Germany
- 2012: stop motion workshop at the Youth Training Institute, Hanau
- 2011: stop motion workshop at the Royal Film Commission, Amman, Jordan
- 2007 - 2011: annual stop motion workshop at the University of Television and Film Munich
- 2003: animation workshop at the University of Kassel Art College
- 1997, 2000 - 2001: animation lectures at the Film Academy Baden-Wuerttemberg
- 1997, 2001 and 2008: animation lectures at the Academy of Media Arts Cologne
- 1996: several animation lectures at the Karlsruhe University of Arts and Design

His film, Quest, was included in the Animation Show of Shows.

== Filmography ==
- 2013: Virtuos Virtuell, animated experimental film (directors: Thomas Stellmach, Maja Oschmann)
- 2001-2008: Commercials, computer animation / cartoon animation / stop motion animation, Client: Wrigley's HubbaBubba / BBDO-Düsseldorf, German Pay-TV Premiere / Goldammer, Landesbausparkasse / BBDO-Berlin, Lindt & Sprüngli / FCB Wilkens, MTV-Germany, ZDF-German Television / Kika (Direction, Animation, Production: Lichthof - Film & Animation)

Short films and commercials during study

Direction, Animation, Production: Thomas Stellmach (As far as nothing else is mentioned.)

- 2000: Chicken Kiev, cartoon animation, 9 min
- 1998: Lebenshilfe-Commercial, cartoon animation, 0:30 min, (Idea, Director, Animation: Monika Stellmach), Client: Lebenshilfe e.V.
- 1996: Quest, puppet animation, 11 min, (Director: Tyron Montgomery)
- 1995: 100 Years of Cinema, cartoon animation, 3 min, (Idea, Director, Animation, Production: Students of the Art College Kassel), Client: HR-Television
- 1994: Old Super Lady, cartoon animation, 0:30 min, Client: MTV-Europe
- 1994: Small Talk, pixilation, 5 min, (Animation: Students of the Art College Kassel)
- 1994: Filmladen-Trailer, pixilation, 2 min, (Animation: Students of the Art College Kassel), Client: Filmladen Kassel
- 1992: Weeds, cartoon animation, 5 min
- 1988: Gulp, experimental / life action, 5 min, (Idea, Director, Animation, Production: Mark Feuerstake; Actor: Thomas Stellmach)
- 1988: Tee-Hee, cartoon animation, 2 min

Short films before study

- 1987: White, puppet animation, 11 min
- 1986: Let me live, clay animation, 6 min
- 1986: Rom and Jul, object animation, 14 min
- 1985: The last Leaf, clay animation, 6 min
- 1985: The big Labyrinth, clay animation, 5 min
- 1985: Competition without Winners, object animation, 12 min
- 1984: Clay, clay animation, 5 min
- 1982: Domino Play, 5 min, object animation
