= The Danish Poet =

- Directed by: Torill Kove
- Produced by: Lise Fearnley; Marcy Page
- Narrated by: Liv Ullmann
- Edited by: Phyllis Lewis
- Music by: Kevin Dean
- Distributed by: Norwegian Film Institute (Europe); National Film Board of Canada (International)
- Release date: 15 February 2006
- Running time: 15 minutes
- Countries: Norway; Canada
- Language: English

The Danish Poet (Norwegian: Den danske dikteren) is a 2006 animated short film written, directed, and animated by Torill Kove and narrated by Liv Ullmann. A co-production of the National Film Board of Canada (NFB) and Mikrofilm AS of Norway, it has won both the Academy Award and Genie Award for best animated short film.

== Synopsis ==
The film begins with the narrator telling the audience that they used to believe that all human beings start out as seeds floating in outer space, waiting to be born. The narrator also states that every person's chance of being born depends on their parents meeting.

The narrator says that their own parents met due to a chain of events that began in an apartment in 1940s Copenhagen, Denmark. The apartment is inhabited by Kaspar Jorgensen, a Danish poet who is unable to write new material. His psychiatrist, Dr Mork, prescribes that Kaspar spend the summer in Norway. So, Kaspar goes to the library to research on Norwegian holiday destinations but instead reads about Sigrid Undset, the Danish-born Norwegian author of Kristin Lavransdatter. Moved by the plot of the Nobel Prize winner's novel, Kaspar sends Sigrid Undset a letter, asking to meet her for inspiration. Sigrid Undset replies to Kaspar, telling him to visit her in Lillehammer anytime. Overjoyed, Kaspar takes the ferry to Norway.

Upon arriving in Norway, Kaspar goes to a local farm to seek shelter from the rain. The farmer, Lundegaard, is a distant relative of Sigrid Undset's and welcomes Kaspar to his home. While staying on the farm, Kaspar falls in love with Lundegaard's daughter, Ingeborg, and she also falls for him. Kaspar proposes to Ingeborg with a poem, only for her to reveal that she is already engaged to the son of her father's best friend, and that the wedding will take place in August. When Kaspar mentions the protagonist of Kristin Lavransdatter leaving her fiancé Simon to marry Erlend despite her father's objections, Ingeborg chooses to obey her own patriarch.

On her wedding day, Ingeborg gives Kaspar a lock of her hair, promising not to cut it until they are reunited. Forgetting his visit to Sigrid Undset, a heartbroken Kaspar returns to Denmark, writing sad poems and re-reading Kristin Lavransdatter.

Back in Norway, Ingeborg regrets not marrying Kaspar and her husband demands that she cut her long hair. A cow slips off a barn plank and falls on Ingeborg's husband, killing him. Ingeborg then sends Kaspar a letter, telling him that they can get married. However, the mailman loses Ingeborg's letter which is then eaten by a goat. Ingeborg spends years waiting for Kaspar's reply, employing her neighbours' children to maintain her growing hair for her. One of the children, a girl named Veslemy, becomes Ingeborg's favourite hairdresser. When Sigrid Undset dies, Veslemy convinces Ingeborg to attend the funeral and Dr. Mork prescribes Kaspar to do the same.

At Sigrid Undset's funeral, Kaspar and Ingeborg are reunited and he tells her not to cut her hair because he loves it long. Kaspar and Ingeborg marry and live happily in his apartment for years. Kaspar later becomes a bestselling author when he publishes a poetry collection titled Joy and Happiness. When Kaspar breaks his thumb from tripping in Ingeborg's hair, she calls a now adult Veslemy, requesting for an urgent haircut.

While on board the train to Oslo, Veslemy meets Petter, a fan of Kaspar's, who is also travelling to Denmark to meet the poet for inspiration. In Copenhagen, Ingeborg gets a haircut, Kaspar inspires his fan, and Petter and Veslemy fall in love, becoming the narrator's parents.

== Production ==
Kove first became involved with the National Film Board, an agency of the government of Canada, after her first year at Concordia University in Montreal. After working there as an assistant for some years, she wrote and pitched a script to the company, which led to her career as a director and animator. She first wrote the script for The Danish Poet some time ago, though she says that she "can't really remember when".

Production was split between Marcy Page, of the National Film Board, and Lise Fearnley, of Mikrofilm AS in Norway, and took roughly three years, although Kove took a year off for maternity leave.

The film was made using hand-drawn traditional animation, with pencil on paper, and then scanned and digitally coloured, with about half of the animation by Kove, and the rest divided between animators in Montreal and Norway. Kove's style is simplistic, which she says is less a specific style choice than "quite simply [...] the only one I know how to do." The backgrounds were painted by Montreal artist Anne Ashton.

Narrator Liv Ullmann was selected for the film because Kove liked her voice and "thought that her delivery would be right for the story"; she reaffirmed this after the film's release, stating that Ullmann was "just right". She thanked Ullmann in her Academy Award acceptance speech, saying that "it was really amazing of her to participate in this." Back in 1995, Ullman herself directed a film adaptation of Kristin Lavransdatter, the novel featured in The Danish Poet.

== Origins ==
Kove's first ideas for The Danish Poet began when she went through a period of self-assessment; she wanted to write a story about what she described as when "you reach a turning point or a milestone and you look back and you think 'how in the heck did I get here?' [...] And you realize that the answer lies somewhere in a complex web of all kinds of stuff, like genetic make-up, upbringing, coincidences, choices you made along the way, missed opportunities, [and] lucky breaks." She felt that it was a natural choice to centre on a relationship between two people, "because relationships, and especially the romantic ones, play a huge role in shaping our lives, and also, obviously, in creating new ones."

Kove originally wanted to make the film biographical, based on a story her father told her: he had dreamed of being an artist, and made an appointment with an art teacher to ask if he was good enough to make it in the art world. However, he stood at the top of the stairs and decided not to go, eventually deciding to go to architecture school (as his parents wanted) where he met his wife. Kove's inspiration was drawn from the fact that her existence seemed to hinge on that decision, because "if the artist had said, 'Oh, you must paint,' you know, then in all likelihood he would never have met my mother, and, you know, that would have been it for my chances." However, Kove felt the story was too personal, and rewrote it to be fictional.

== Themes ==
The film's main theme shows the effect that coincidence and chance can have on the course of life—like the bad weather, angry dog, hungry goats, slippery planks, and careless postman that change the course of both Kaspar's and Ingeborg's lives—and shows, as the film's website states, that "seemingly unrelated factors might play important roles in the big scheme of things after all." In an interview, Kove said that "what I'm trying to get across is just that I think life is really a kind of a meandering journey ... a lot is really up to chance". Kove has also said that she'd like people to be able to interpret the film in different ways:

I'd like them to walk away thinking it's a film that can be interpreted in more than one way. I'm happy when I hear from people who've seen the short that it makes them think about the kind of strangeness where we find inspiration for art and where we find love, and the kind of miraculousness of just being alive and having a life. I'm pleased when people get that out of it.

She also identifies several subplots of artistic inspiration, as Kaspar "finds [inspiration] within himself", and not within another writer, and a "subtext ... about nationalism and how much emphasis we in the western world put on stereotypes and on which country we're from".

== Awards ==
The Danish Poet received the Academy Award for Animated Short Film at the 79th Academy Awards in 2007, a second Oscar nomination (and first win) for Kove, who was nominated in 2000 for her first professional film, My Grandmother Ironed the King's Shirts, also co-produced by the NFB. The win also marked the first Norwegian film to win an Academy Award since Thor Heyerdahl's Kon-Tiki won for best documentary in 1952.

The Danish Poet also won Best Animated Short at the 27th Genie Awards in 2007, and a Norwegian-language picture book adaptation was nominated for the 2007 Brage Prize. It was also included in the 2006 Animation Show of Shows.
