= Quest (1996 film) =

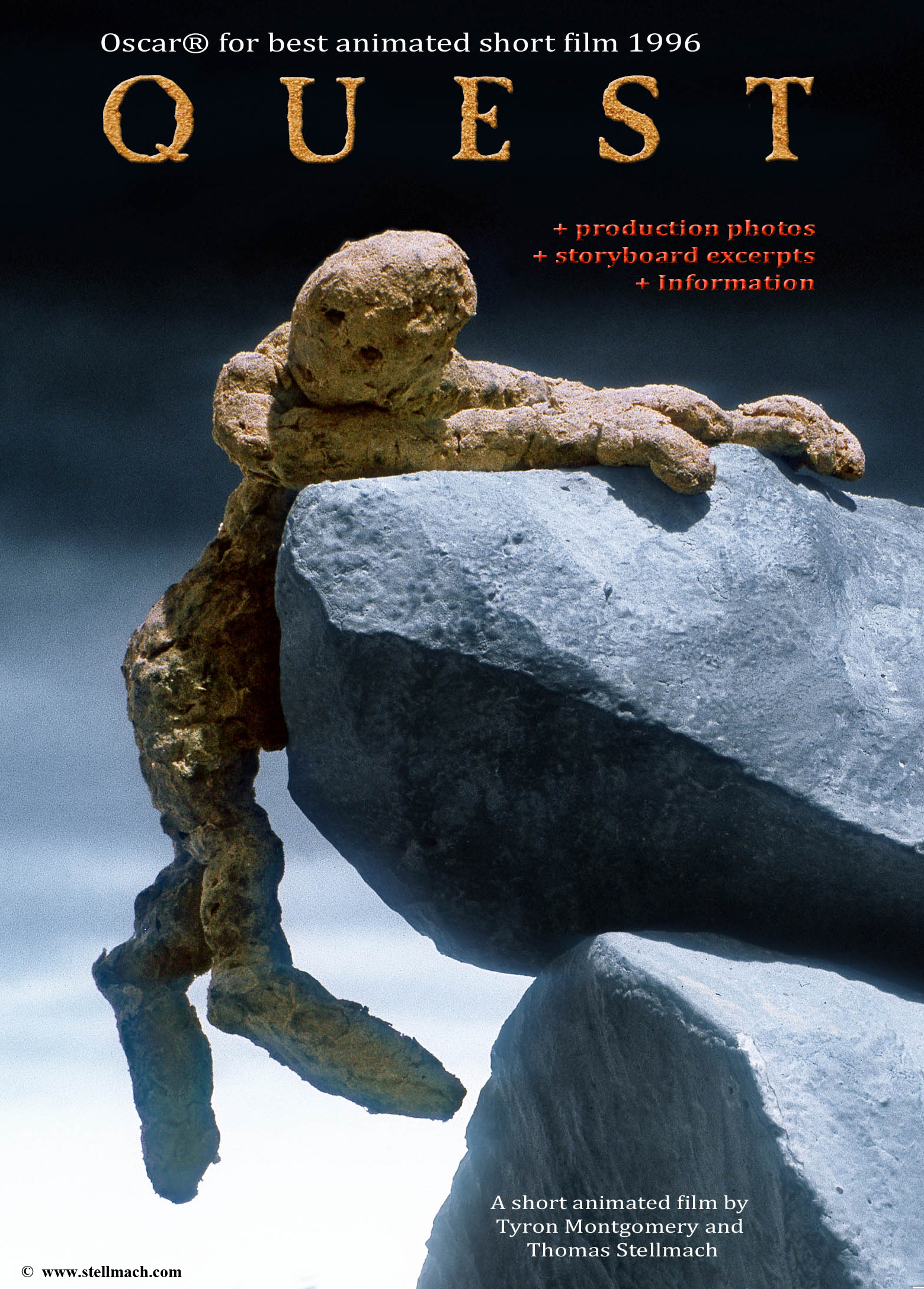
- Directed by: Tyron Montgomery
- Written by: Thomas Stellmach (story); Tyron Montgomery (screenplay)
- Produced by: Thomas Stellmach
- Cinematography: Tyron Montgomery
- Edited by: Tyron Montgomery
- Music by: Wolfram Spyra
- Animation by: Thomas Stellmach
- Distributed by: Thomas Stellmach
- Release date: 1996
- Running time: 11:30
- Country: Germany
- Language: no dialogue

Quest is a 1996 German animated short film directed by Tyron Montgomery, written (story) and produced by Thomas Stellmach at the University of Kassel - Art College. After four years of production it won several awards including the Academy Award for Best Animated Short Film.

Supported by the German Federal Film Board and the Cultural Film Fund of the State of Hessian the puppet animation film was shot frame by frame with an ARRI II BV and a self constructed single frame motor. The character was made of brass skeleton, latex foam and sand. Together with the flying paper, the falling stones and the rotating machines the puppet was manipulated and photographed 19,000 times and reviewed only by video control. No digital compositing software was used.

Quest is distributed by Thomas Stellmach. It is part of the Animation Show of Shows as well.

== Story ==
In search of water, a sand puppet leaves the sand world in which it lives, wandering through worlds made of paper, stone and iron, following the sound of dripping water. In the end the sand puppet manages to reach the water, in a tragic way.

== Awards ==
- OSCAR© of the Academy of Motion Picture Arts and Sciences (AMPAS) for the Best Short Animation Film 1996, (awarded 1997), Los Angeles
- Certificate: "exceptional valuable" Film Valuation Authority Wiesbaden, Germany
- CARTOON D'OR 96, best film of the European Animated Prize Winner Films, awarded by the European Association of Animation Film, Brussels, Belgium
- Grand Prix for best school film 1997, European First Film Festival of Angers, France
- European Broadcasters Award, European Short Film Competition, Brussels International Festival of Fantastic Film (BIFFF), Belgium (1997)
- Best Debut Film 1997, World Animation Film Festival, Los Angeles, USA
- Special Jury Prize 1997, Clermont Ferrand Short Film Festival, France
- Bronze Worldmedal 1997, New York Festival, USA
- ALVES COSTA PRIZE, Special Award of the Journalists, International Animation Film Festival Espinho, CINANIMA 96, Portugal
- ZLATKO GRIGIC - Prize for Best Debut Film, International Animation Film Festival Zagreb 1996, Croatia
- Golden Damby award International Animation EXPO Seoul 1997, Korea
- CITY OF MELBOURNE AWARD for Best Animation Film 1996, International Film Festival of Melbourne, Australia
- DON QUIJOTE - Prize of the critics FICC International Short Film Festival of Kraków, Poland
- GOLD HUGO, 1996, Student Animation Category, International Film Festival Chicago, USA
- Best European Short Film, International Film Festival Cork 1996, Ireland
- Best Animation 1996, Albany International Short Film Festival, USA
- Best Animation 1997, MEDIAWAVE, International Festival of Media Arts, Győr, Hungary
- Best Animation 1996, Molodist - Kyiv International Film Festival, Ukraine
- Grand Prix for Best School Film 1997, International Film Festival Huy, Belgium
- Grand Prix 1997, International Film Festival of Environment, "Green Vision", St. Petersburg
- Grand Prix International Mountain and Adventure Film Festival Graz 1997, Austria
- Category Award (10 to 30 min), International Animation Film Festival "Krok", Kyiv 1997, Ukraine
- First Audience Prize of the German TV Station - SDR 1996, International Animation Film Festival of Stuttgart, Germany
- SILVER DANZANTE for the best Animation Film 1996, Huesca International Film Festival, Spain
- Nominated for the German Short Film Award 1996, Federal Ministry of the Interior, Germany
- First Audience Prize of the 7 nominated German short films 1996, Federal Ministry of the Interior, Germany
- ANIMAT'T Award, Sitges International Fantasy Film Festival of Barcelona 1996, Spain
- First Audience Prize 1996, International Film Celebration of Dresden, Germany
- Jury Special Award 1996, Festival international du film d'environnement, Rienna, France
- SECOND PRIZE 1996, International Short Film Festival Drama, Greece
- Best Animation Film 1996, International Short Film Festival of Hamburg, Germany
- OEKOMEDIA Award for the Best Artistic Achievement 1996, International Ecological Film Festival of Freiburg
- Germany Special Prize of the Federal Minister of the Environment for Outstanding Achievement in the Field of Environment Education 1996, Oekomedia, International Ecological Film Festival of Freiburg
- Special Prize of the National Park Administration "Lower Saxony Mud-flats" 1996, Maritime Film Days of Wilhelmshaven, Germany
- Laudable Mention of pupils 1996, Maritime Film Days of Wilhelmshaven, Germany
- Second Prize 1996, Exground on screen, Wiesbaden, Germany
- Tour Prize of the University Kassel 1996, Germany
- Friedrich-Wilhelm-Murnau-Prize 1996 Wiesbaden, Germany
- Compilation Best of Ottawa 1996, International Animation Film Festival of Ottawa, Canada

== Preservation ==
The Academy Film Archive preserved Quest in 2010.

== Bibliography ==
- Olivier Cotte (2007) Secrets of Oscar-winning animation: Behind the scenes of 13 classic short animations. (Making of Quest) Focal Press. ISBN 978-0-240-52070-4
