= La Maison en Petits Cubes =

- Directed by: Kunio Katō
- Written by: Kenya Hirata
- Produced by: Masanori Kusakabe; Yuko Hata
- Music by: Kenji Kondo
- Production company: Oh! Production
- Release date: 2008
- Running time: 12 minutes
- Country: Japan

La Maison en Petits Cubes (つみきのいえ, Tsumiki no ie; "The House of Small Cubes") is a 2008 Japanese animated drama short film created by Kunio Katō, with music by Kenji Kondo and produced by Robot Communications and animated by Oh! Production.

It won several prizes, including The Annecy Cristal at the 32nd Annecy International Animated Film Festival and the Academy Award for Best Animated Short Film at the 81st Academy Awards. It was also included in the Animation Show of Shows in 2008.

== Plot ==
As his town is flooded by water, an aged widower is forced to add additional levels on to his home in order to stay dry. But when he accidentally drops his favourite smoking pipe into the lower submerged levels of his home, his search for the pipe eventually makes him relive scenes from his eventful life (including his time before the flooding began).

== Production ==
The concept for the film originated when Kunio Katō was studying at Tama Art University in Tokyo. It initially took the form of a painting featuring box-shaped houses arranged in stacks. During this time, Kunio was introduced to the world of animation when he watched Mark Baker's 1989 debut short film, The Hill Farm. This experience significantly influenced Kunio's creative direction. He collaborated with his colleague and screenwriter, Kenya Hirata, to bring the project to life. However, despite receiving acclaim afterward, Kunio remained unsatisfied with the project as a whole.

== Accolades ==
La Maison en Petits Cubes has won the following awards:

- 2008 Hiroshima International Animation Festival
  - Hiroshima Prize
  - Audience Prize
- 2008 Japan Media Arts Festival
  - Grand Prize – Animation Division
- 2008 Annecy International Animated Film Festival
  - Junior Jury Award
  - The Annecy Cristal
- 2009 Academy Awards
  - Best Animated Short Film
- 2008 Message to Man
  - Best Animated Film
- 2008 Anima Mundi
  - Best Script – Jury Award
- 2008 LA Shorts Fest
  - Best Animation
