= Torill Kove =

Norwegian-Canadian animator and film director

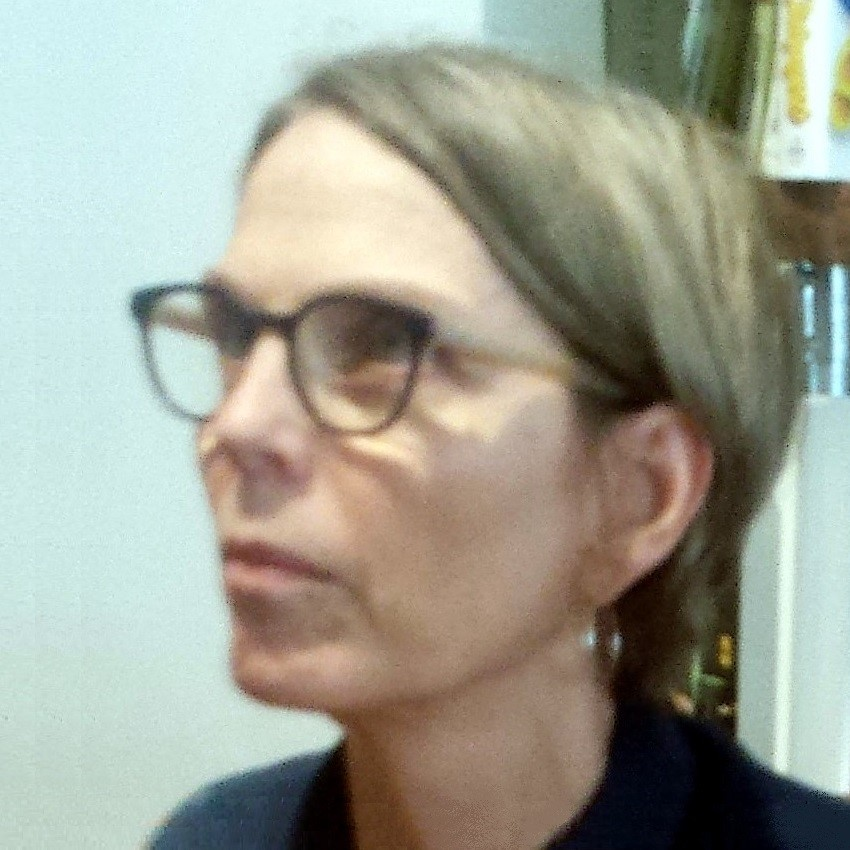
- Born: 25 May 1958; Hamar Municipality
- Education: Concordia University
- Occupation: Illustrator, screenwriter
- Employer: National Film Board of Canada (1995–)
- Awards: Academy Award for Best Animated Short Film (The Danish Poet, 79th Academy Awards, 2007)

Torill Kove is a Norwegian-born Canadian film director and animator. She won the 2007 Academy Award for Animated Short Film for the film The Danish Poet, co-produced by Norway's Mikrofilm AS and the National Film Board of Canada (NFB).

== Life and career ==
Torill Kove was born in Hamar, in the south of Norway near Oslo.

In 1982 she moved to Montreal, Quebec, Canada to continue her academic studies in urban planning at Concordia University earning a master's degree at McGill University, later changing her major to animation.

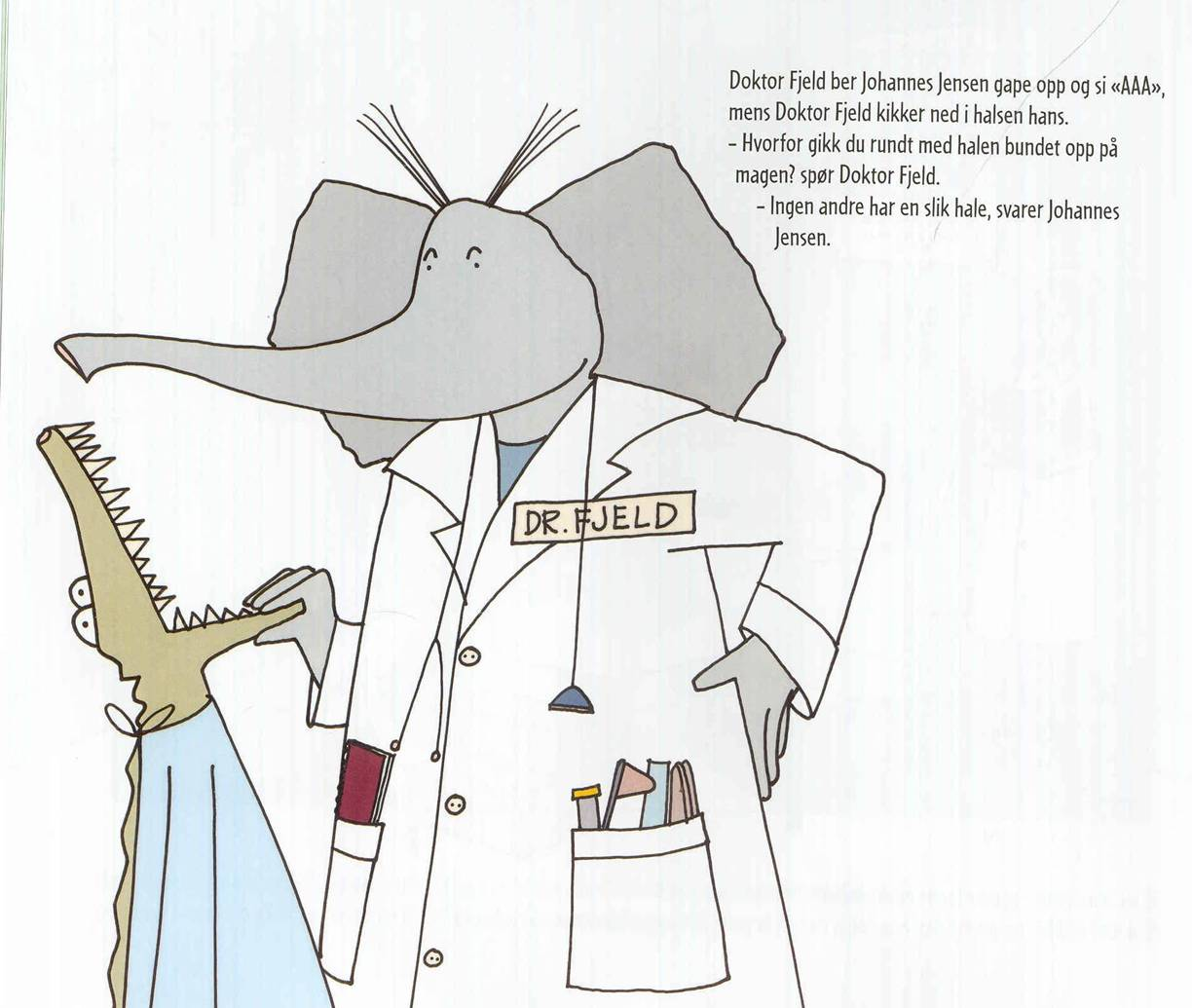
Characteristic illustration by Torill Kove; from Norwegian children's book Johannes Jensen føler seg annerledes (Johannes Jensen feeling strange) from 2003

== Career ==
Kove has stated that she in fact did not watch much animation until she was in her thirties. Unemployed in the fall of 1991, rather than look for work she spent time at the NFB's former public access facility on St. Denis Street, where every day she would watch films. "Two things happened as I was sifting through the NFB animation collection: one was excitement at having discovered such a wonderful treasure of films, and the other was a voice in me that said loud and clear 'I want to do this.'"

Her first Academy Award nomination was for My Grandmother Ironed the King's Shirts in 2000, inspired by the story of her own grandmother who had ironed the shirts of Norway's King Haakon VII for many years.

In 2013 she directed the Danish-Norwegian-Swedish animated feature Hocus Pocus Alfie Atkins, based on the Alfie Atkins books by Swedish children's book author Gunilla Bergström.

Kove's 2014 animated short, Me and My Moulton, produced by Mikrofilm AS and NFB, is an autobiographical film about a little girl’s desire to fit in, premiering at the 2014 Toronto International Film Festival. It was then nominated for an Academy Award on 15 January 2015.

Her films The Danish Poet and My Grandmother Ironed the King's Shirts were included in the Animation Show of Shows.

In February 2015, Kove stated that her next film would be based on her life in Montreal, specifically in the Shaughnessy Village neighbourhood. In May 2016, Kove stated on the NFB's blog that she was in production on a more minimalist film, Threads, inspired by her experiences as an adoptive parent:

...Threads has been an experiment in working simply. I’m drawing on a basic tablet, using Toon Boom Harmony Software — and in the end I’ve opted for one of the basic pre-set brushes. I’ve set myself the challenge of making a five-minute film within a year, and that’s part of the appeal. Keeping it simple makes it easier to try new things with the visual universe that I want to create.

In addition to directing and animating short films, she has also illustrated several children's books. On 3 September 2015, she received the Anders Jahre Culture Prize, Norway's top cultural prize.

In 2024, Kove released her short film Maybe Elephants, described as a sequel to Me and My Moulton, which received critical success in various festivals throughout the world.
