= Runaway (2009 film) =

- Film poster
- Directed by: Cordell Barker
- Written by: Cordell Barker
- Produced by: Michael Scott; Derek Mazur
- Music by: Benoît Charest
- Production company: National Film Board of Canada
- Distributed by: National Film Board of Canada
- Release date: May 2009 (Cannes)
- Running time: 9 minutes
- Country: Canada
- Language: English

Runaway is a 2009 short animated comedy film by Canadian animator Cordell Barker. It received a special jury award for short films at the Annecy International Animation Film Festival and was named the best animated short film at the 2010 Genie Awards. In 2010, the film won the Yorkton Film Festival Golden Sheaf Award for Best Animation.

The film was also selected for the Sundance Film Festival and was short-listed, though not nominated, for the Academy Award for Best Animated Short Film. It was also included in the Animation Show of Shows.

== Plot ==
The film's story takes place aboard an out-of-control train. Barker intended the film to be a parable about life, and how the ruling class tries in vain to insulate itself from the fate suffered by the lower classes:

The metaphor of this film is that, whether you notice the jeopardy or not, everybody is trapped on this track, and we’re all going to the same place,” Barker explains. “I’m a bit of a Cassandra. I’m always feeling like I’m looking around and seeing this really apparent jeopardy. But a lot of people I know [have] that kind of disbelief that anything can shake their normal day-to-day life,” he says. “I keep thinking, ‘Man, we’re doomed.'

== Production ==
The film was produced in Winnipeg by Michael Scott and Derek Mazur for the National Film Board of Canada. The musical score for the film was composed by Benoît Charest, known for composing the film score for the animated film The Triplets of Belleville (Les Triplettes de Belleville).

Runaway took Barker eight years to complete. The entire film was made with hand-drawn animation, with the exception of some more visually complex scenes:

I brought on Frantic Films early on in the production to just do a couple of shots where the train is doing a three-dimensional action. There was no way I was going to sit down and animate that train coming around the track, especially in the middle of the film, when the camera is actually moving through the train, through all the cars. It's one thing when things are moving past the sides of the camera, everything's moving more quickly, but that end point, the perspective point where its are barely moving from frame to frame - that would have been just horrible, trying to animate that.

== Cast ==
- Richard Condie as the Captain
- Leonard Waldner as the Fireman
- Muriel Hogue as the Lady

== Musicians ==
- Chet Doxas, clarinet
- Jim Doxas, drum kit
- Mike Cartile, trumpet
- Al McClean, saxophone
- Dave Martin, tuba
- Morgan Moore, bass
- John Sadowy, piano
