= Strange Invaders (2001 film) =

- Directed by: Cordell Barker
- Story by: Cordell Barker
- Produced by: Jennifer Torrance; Cordell Barker
- Starring: Cordell Barker; Jennifer Torrance; Jackson Barker
- Music by: Luc Préfontaine
- Distributed by: National Film Board of Canada
- Release date: 2001
- Running time: 8 minutes
- Country: Canada
- Language: English

Strange Invaders is a 2001 short animated film by animator Cordell Barker. It tells the story of Roger and Doris, a couple who lead a quiet life. When a child crashes into their living room, the couple are initially enthralled. However, the child (referred to in the credits only as "It") becomes increasingly destructive and proceeds to ransack their home and ruin their lives. Things become increasingly bizarre until Roger realises the true nature of It.

Strange Invaders was Barker's second short film after The Cat Came Back. Strange Invaders was inspired by Barker's experience as the father of his "three evil boys." Strange Invaders won numerous awards around the world and was nominated for an Oscar for Best Animated Short It was also included in the Animation Show of Shows. Strange Invaders appeared on the Canadian TV show ZeD on March 22, 2001. The film was produced in Barker's hometown of Winnipeg, Manitoba.

== Cast ==
- Cordell Barker as Roger
- Jennifer Torrance as Doris
- Jackson Barker as It
