= Two Eastern Hair Lines =

- Directed by: Steven Woloshen
- Release date: 2004
- Running time: 4 minutes
- Country: Canada

Two Eastern Hair Lines is a Canadian animated short film, directed by Steven Woloshen and released in 2004. Made by applying bleaching and painting techniques to found footage, the film illustrates themes of communication difficulties between people by framing, blocking or highlighting individuals in the scenes to divide them from other people.

It was a Jutra Award nominee for Best Animated Short Film at the 6th Jutra Awards in 2004.
