= Orange Is the New Yellow =

- The Simpsons episode
- Episode no.: Season 27; Episode 22
- Directed by: Matthew Faughnan
- Written by: Eric Horsted
- Production code: VABF15
- Original air date: May 22, 2016

Guest appearance
- Kevin Michael Richardson as Prison Guard

Episode features
- Chalkboard gag: "Millhouse does not live below the puberty line"
- Couch gag: The Simpsons appear in an IKEA-inspired manual guide that was designed by Michał Socha. Homer buys a kit to replace the family's missing couch, tries and fails to assemble it, then steals Ned Flanders' couch instead.

Episode chronology
← Previous "Simprovised"	Next → "Monty Burns' Fleeing Circus"
- The Simpsons season 27

"Orange Is the New Yellow" is the twenty-second and final episode of the twenty-seventh season of the American animated television series The Simpsons, and the 596th episode of the series overall. The episode was directed by Matthew Faughnan and written by Eric Horsted. It aired in the United States on Fox on May 22, 2016. The title is a spoof of the book and the Netflix series Orange Is the New Black.

In this episode, Marge is sent to prison when Bart is caught playing by himself outside, so Homer is forced to care for the children by himself. The episode received mixed reviews.

== Plot ==
Homer is leaving the Power Plant for the weekend, as he promised Marge to be home for dinner. However, as he is leaving, Mr. Burns asks him for his help to fix a gas leak with a "Safety First" poster, and to measure its level with a plumb bob (a procedure that takes hours to complete).

At home, Marge is having trouble taking care of the kids. She is trying to help Lisa with a school project (dressing her as a male seahorse) and feed Maggie. However, Maggie spills her food all over the room. Bart offers to help clean the mess, but he ends up causing even more of a mess with the chemical products. Frustrated, Marge asks him to go play outside. Bart goes to the Springfield Park, where Martin's mother, Martha, realizes that he is by himself and calls the police. The cops take Bart back home and arrest Marge for neglecting her son just in time for Homer to witness this.

Marge is sentenced to three months in the Springfield Women's Prison. However, she realizes that she could use the time to take a break from the stress of being a homemaker. Meanwhile, Homer is having trouble taking care of the kids, but some Springfield residents (especially Ned Flanders) realize that he is going through a difficult phase and decide to help him.

Back at the jail, Marge manages to fit in well. She uses her hair as a weapon against bullies and makes some friends, but Homer hires the Blue-Haired Lawyer, who finds out that Marge could not be arrested because of a technicality, and she is set free. However, Marge, not ready to go back to all the responsibilities of being a homemaker, fires a guard's gun and earns two more months inside.

Homer, depressed at Marge's unwillingness to come home, vows to become the perfect homemaker for her sake, imagining a black and white scenario where he is dressed as a woman and Marge in a suit going to her job. Meanwhile, other parents take Marge's position as a warning, and they decide to overprotect their children to the point of each one taking turns to take them all on a walk on leashes. When Homer's turn to walk them goes wrong, the kids have had enough of their parents' attitudes and decide to sneak into the park to have fun by themselves. Their fun is ruined by a tornado, which drags them into a tree. Meanwhile, Marge realizes she too misses her family when everything begins to remind her of them, and in her sorrow, accidentally causes a prison break. In the middle of the mayhem, she finds Homer undercover as a prison guard in order to rescue her, they both escape safely as the police are too busy sorting out the disarray caused by the tornado to bother going after them.

They soon arrive back home, where Bart and Lisa become overly attached to her and the entire family ends up hugging inside the closet.

== Production ==
This is the first episode written by Eric Horsted, who had previously written for creator Matt Groening's television series Futurama. Guest animator Michał Socha directed his second couch gag for this episode. He directed his first couch gag for the twenty-fifth season episode "What to Expect When Bart's Expecting."

== Reception ==
"Orange Is the New Yellow" scored a 1.1 rating and was watched by 2.54 million viewers, making it the second most watched show on Fox that night after Family Guy.

Dennis Perkins of The A.V. Club gave the episode a C+, stating, "'Orange Is the New Yellow' is...nondescript? Perfunctory? Fine? It’s fine. It’s got a laugh or two around the fringes...There’s a satirical edge to the whole 'overprotected children' angle that clearly engaged the writers room a bit (the episode is the first credited to Futurama vet Eric Horsted)...But the idea that Springfield’s justice system would overreact by pulling guns on Marge and sending her to prison is just plausible enough to be upsetting...And there’s a reliable number of offbeat gags throughout to make this an unassumingly pleasant way to kill a half-hour."

Tony Sokol of Den of Geek gave the episode 3 out of 5 stars. He said the episode was mediocre but expected more for a season finale.

Jesse Schedeen of IGN gave the episode a 6.8 out of 10. He felt the episode was too similar to the fourth season episode "Marge in Chains."

== See also ==
- "Marge in Chains" (1993)
