= Kunio Katō =

Japanese animator

- 加藤久仁生
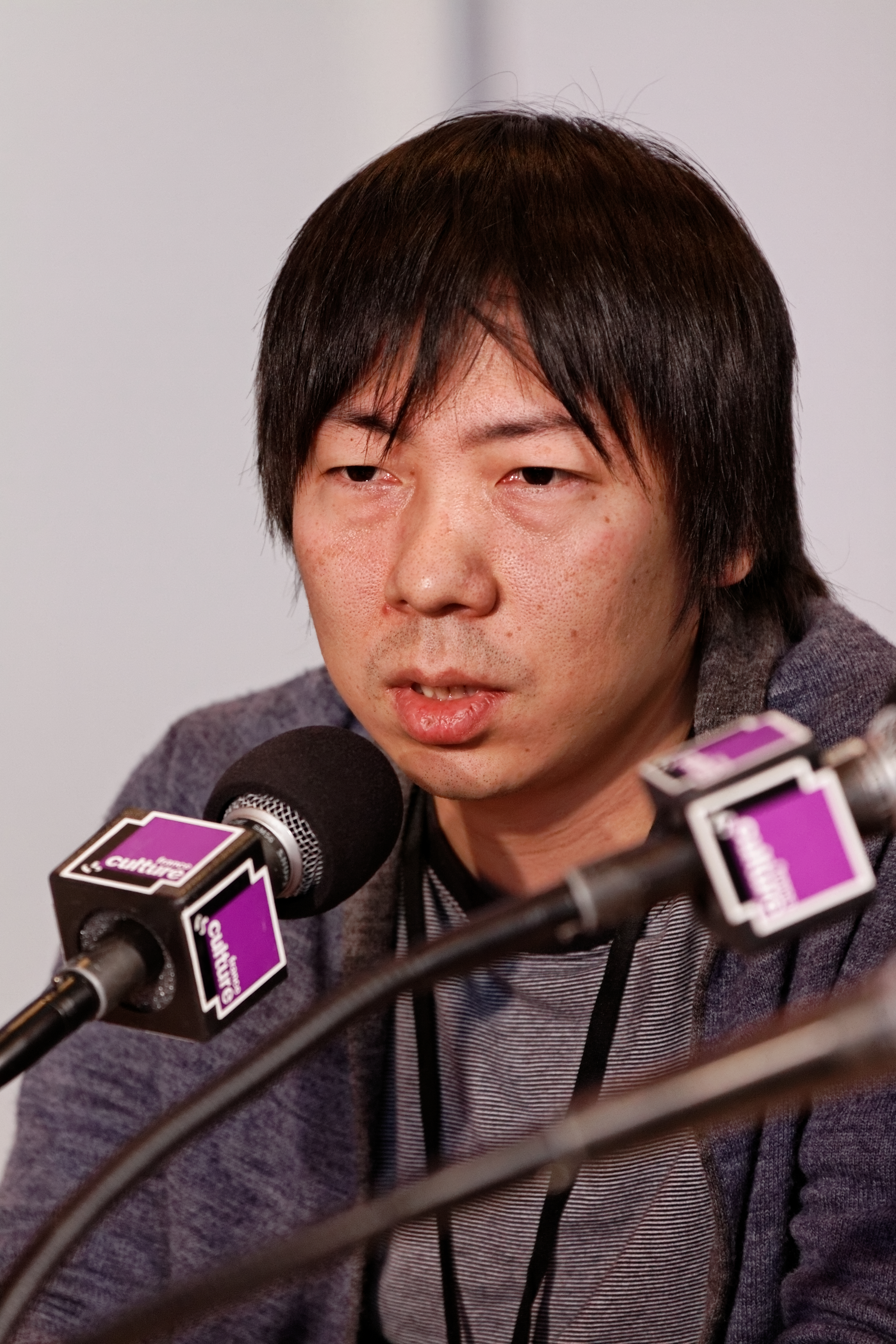
- Kunio Kato at Paris Salon du Livre in 2012
- Born: April 24, 1977 (age 49); Kagoshima City
- Occupations: Animator, director
- Notable work: La Maison en Petits Cubes

Kunio Katō (加藤久仁生) (born April 24, 1977) is a Japanese animator known for the short film La Maison en Petits Cubes which won the 2008 Academy Award for Best Animated Short Film. In 2008, the same film won the Cristal for a Short Film (Grand Prix) at the Annecy International Animated Film Festival, making Katō the second Japanese filmmaker to receive the award after Kōji Yamamura's Mt. Head in 2003. He also created The Diary Of Tortov Roddle, a surrealistic dream adventure.

== Biography ==
After graduating from the graphic design department of Tama Art University, Katō joined the video production company Robot Communications in 2001. Affiliated with the character animation department's Animation Studio Cage, he worked on television programs, web animations, and spot commercials. In 2017, he left Robot Communications to work as a freelance animation artist. The same year, he directed the animation for NHK's Minna no Uta song "Kaze to Tomoni" (lyrics and music by Hiroji Miyamoto). In 2020, he also animated the song "Kaito" (sung by Arashi, written by Kenshi Yonezu) for the same program.

During his acceptance speech for the Best Animated Short Film award at the 81st Academy Awards in 2009, Katō famously concluded with "Dōmo arigatō, Mr. Roboto," quoting the lyrics from the American rock band Styx's song "Mr. Roboto", which drew laughter from the audience and was a pun on his production company, Robot.

In 2009, he also received the Commissioner for Cultural Affairs Award in the International Art Category, and the Grand Prize in the Animation Division at the 12th Japan Media Arts Festival for La Maison en Petits Cubes.

== Filmography ==
List of production work in anime
Year	Title	Crew role	Notes	Source
2002	O dore! Tai po おどれ!タイポ	Supervisor	short film series	
2004	The Diary Of Tortov Roddle (或る旅人の日記, Aru tabibito no nikki; lit. The Diary of a Certain Traveler)		short film series	
2005	Min'na no uta 'serunokoi' みんなのうた「セルの恋」	Animation		
2008	La Maison en Petits Cubes (つみきのいえ, Tsumiki no Ie)	Director	OVA	

== Influence ==
In 2015 the Chilean writer José Baroja published the story "El hombre del terrón de azúcar", the winning text of the XIII Gonzalo Rojas Pizarro International Contest, inspired by the short film "Middonaitokafe" ("The Midnight Cafe"), included in the film The Diary Of Tortov Roddle (或る旅人の日記, Aru tabibito no nikki; lit. The Diary of a Certain Traveler).
