= Paths of Hate =

- Directed by: Damian Nenow
- Story by: Damian Nenow
- Music by: Jaroslaw Wojcik
- Production company: Platige Image
- Release date: 27 March 2011

Paths of Hate is a Polish short animated film, released in 2011. Produced by Platige Image, it was written and directed by Damian Nenow.

== Story ==
The film explores the anger and hatred that lie deep in the human soul through storytelling in the perspective of two fighter pilots (German and British) during world war 2. It demonstrates the great lengths man will go for hate as well as the blinding power it holds.

== Awards and achievements ==
- Special Distinction at Annecy International Animation Film Festival in 2011.
- Best International Animated Film and Special Jury Prize at Mundos Digitales, La Coruna, Spain (2011).
- The film competed in the Best Animated Short Subject category at the 39th Annie Awards.
- Grand Jury Prize at VI Córdoba International Animation Festival - ANIMA
