= Animation World Network =

Online publishing agency dedicated to animation

- Website type: News, animation
- Owners: Ron Diamond and Dan Sarto
- Creators: Ron Diamond and Dan Sarto
- Website: awn.com
- Commercial: No
- Registration: Not available
- Launched: April 1, 1996; 30 years ago
- Current status: Active

Animation World Network (often just "AWN") is an online publishing group that specializes in resources for animators, with an extensive website offering news, articles and links for professional animators and animation fans.

== Content ==
Specifically, AWN covers animator profiles, independent film distribution, major animation studio activities, licensing, CGI and other animation technologies, as well as current events in all fields of animation.

AWN also publishes print magazines. The magazines are Animation World, dedicated to animation in general, and VFX World, which focuses on special effects and computer-generated imagery.

== History ==
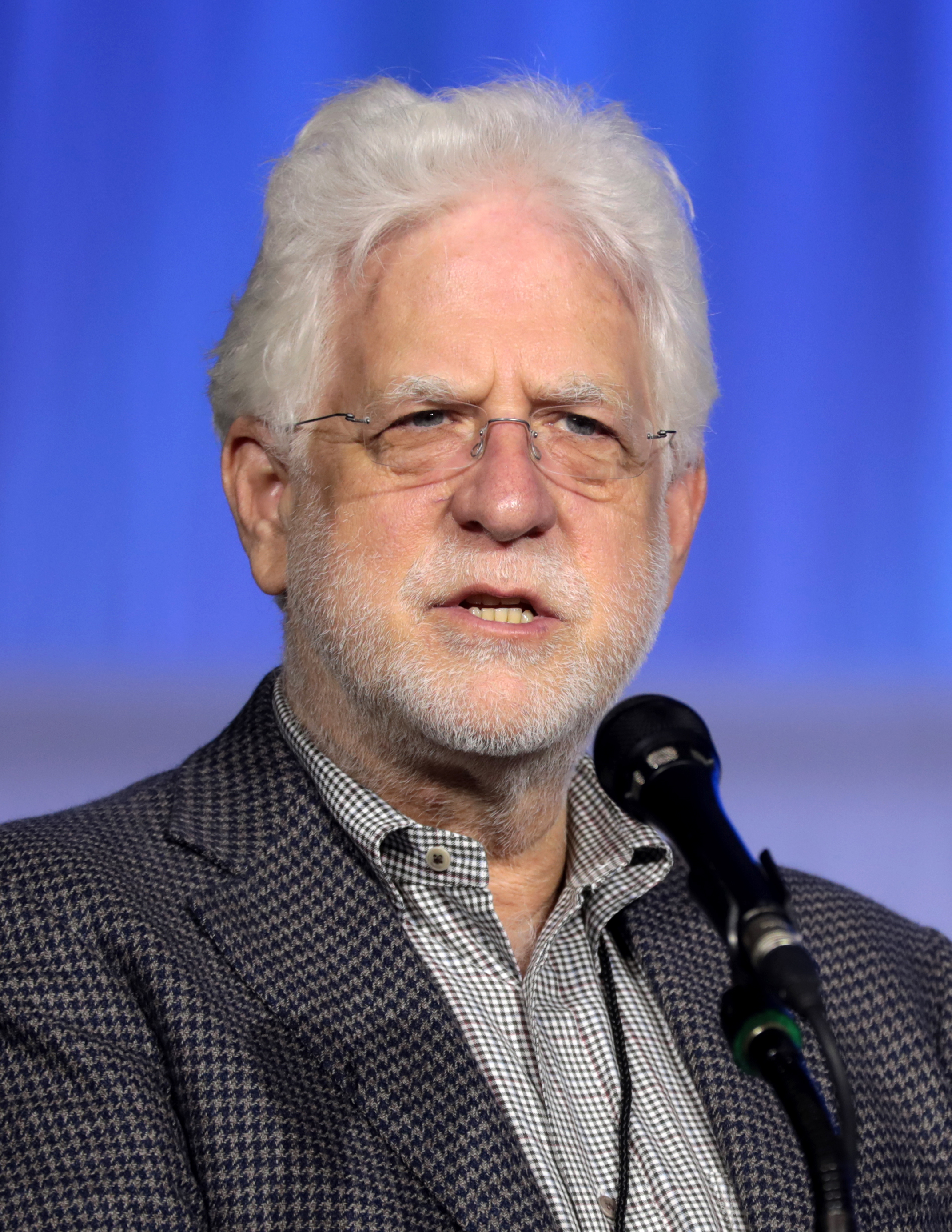
Co-owner Ron Diamond at WonderCon 2022

In 1995, Ron Diamond partnered with Dan Sarto and founded the Animation World Network. A year after Toy Story debuted, Sarto and Diamond produced their first issue. Ron explained that they decided to publish it online instead of in print, as there were not many journalists publishing articles on the Internet during the 1990s, and also that the animators at the time were still exploring the emerging technology when it came to computer animation in films and TV series.

== See also ==
- Cartoon Brew
- Animation Magazine
- History of animation
