= Simone Massi =

Italian filmmaker and animator (born 1970)

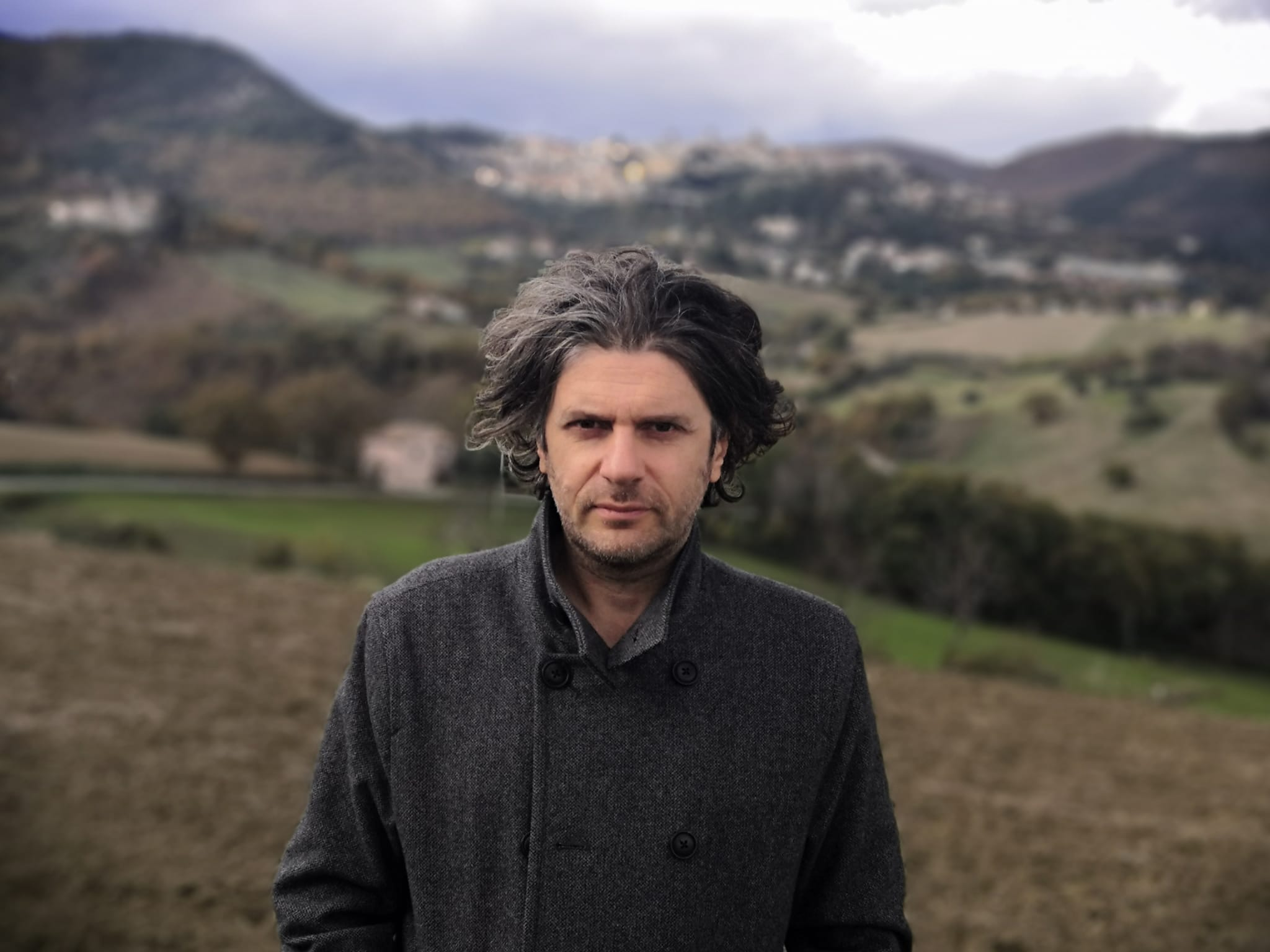
- Massi in 2020
- Born: 23 May 1970 (age 56); Pergola, Marche, Italy
- Occupation: Filmmaker

Simone Massi (born 23 May 1970) is an Italian filmmaker, animator and illustrator. He has been described as "the most internationally known and most awarded Italian animator".

== Life and career ==
Born in Pergola, Marche, Massi studied at the State Institute of Art of Urbino, and after the graduation he started collaborating with several animation studios, including Studio Bozzetto.

Active since 1995, he won the Special Prize at the London International Animation Festival with his 2001 short Tengo la posizione. His 2006 short The Memories of Dogs, co-produced by Arte, won several awards, including the Renzo Kinoshita Award at the Hiroshima International Animation Festival and a Special Critics’ Mention at Animafest Zagreb. His 2011 short, Dell'ammazzare il maiale, was the first animation work to win the David di Donatello for Best Short Film. In 2014, he was the subect of a documentary film, Animata Resistenza by Francesco Montagner and Alberto Girotto, which premiered at the 71st Venice International Film Festival. In 2018, he cured the animation of Stefano Savona's Samouni Road, which won the Œil d'or at the 71st Cannes Film Festival.

In 2023, Massi made his feature-length directorial debut with Nowhere; a portrait of Italian history as seen through the aftermath of the First World War, the Fascism and the Years of Lead, it premiered at the 80th Venice International Film Festival, in the Orizzonti section, in which it won the Lizzani Award.

=== Personal life ===
Massi is married to animator Julia Gromskaiya.

== Style ==
Massi belongs to the neo-pictorial movement, whose style is characterized by the use of painterly techniques and a strong historical dimension. His works are entirely hand-crafted. Giannalberto Bendazzi summarized his style as "outwardly simple", yet characterized by a realism complicated with "absurd travellings, an extraordinary sense of film language, nostalgia for peasant traditions, and political condemnations".
