= My Grandmother Ironed the King's Shirts =

- Directed by: Torill Kove
- Written by: Torill Kove
- Produced by: Lars Tommerbakke; Marcy Page
- Narrated by: Mag Ruffman
- Music by: Kevin Dean
- Production companies: Studio Magica; National Film Board of Canada
- Release date: 1999
- Running time: 10 minutes
- Countries: Canada; Norway
- Language: English

My Grandmother Ironed the King's Shirts is a 1999 animated short by Torill Kove.

== Summary ==
Co-produced by Marcy Page of the National Film Board of Canada and Lars Tømmerbakke of Studio Magica in Norway, the film humorously recounts a tall tale about the filmmaker's grandmother in Oslo, Norway, during World War II, who actually ironed the shirts for Norway's King Haakon VII for many years.

== Production ==
My Grandmother Ironed the King's Shirts was Kove's first film with the NFB. It began as a screenwriting exercise for a class at Concordia University, where Kove had been enrolled. She then pitched the film to producers at the NFB, including its eventual NFB producer, Page. As is the case with her subsequent animated shorts, the musical score for My Grandmother Ironed the King's Shirts was composed by Kove's husband, Kevin Dean. The film is narrated by Mag Ruffman.

== Reception and legacy ==
Awards for the film included a special prize from the Hiroshima International Animation Festival and a Golden Sheaf Award for best Animation. The film was also nominated for an Academy Award for Best Animated Short Film at the 72nd Academy Awards. It was also included in the Animation Show of Shows.

=== Adaptation ===
In May 2017, the NFB and Canadian publisher Firefly Books announced that the film would be adapted into a children's book.
