= Luminaris =

- Directed by: Juan Pablo Zaramella
- Written by: Gustavo Cornillón; Juan Pablo Zaramella
- Produced by: Silvina Cornillon; Mario Rulloni; Sol Rulloni
- Starring: Gustavo Cornillón; María Alche; Luis Rial
- Cinematography: Sergio Piñeyro
- Music by: Osmar Maderna
- Release date: 2011
- Running time: 6 minutes
- Country: Argentina

Luminaris is a 2011 short film directed by Juan Pablo Zaramella, which uses the pixilation technique to blend real actors with animated objects. The film won awards at 324 international film festivals, including the Woodstock Film Festival and Annecy International Animated Film Festival. It won the FIPRESCI prize and made the shortlist for the Academy Award for Best Animated Short Film. The film incorporates several styles, such as art deco, tango, surrealism, and neorealism. The production of the film took more than 2 and a half years, due to the difficulty of combining pixilation techniques with the movement of natural sunlight.

== Plot ==
Set in Buenos Aires, Luminaris is the fantastical story of a man who works in a factory making light bulbs, but yearns for something more.
