= That Christmas =

2024 film by Simon Otto

- Netflix release poster
- Directed by: Simon Otto
- Screenplay by: Richard Curtis; Peter Souter
- Based on: That Christmas and Other Stories by Richard Curtis
- Produced by: Nicole P. Hearon; Adam Tandy
- Starring: Brian Cox; Fiona Shaw; Jodie Whittaker; Bill Nighy
- Edited by: Sim Evan-Jones
- Music by: John Powell
- Production company: Locksmith Animation
- Distributed by: Netflix
- Release dates: 19 October 2024 (BFl); 4 December 2024 (Netflix)
- Running time: 92 minutes
- Countries: United Kingdom; United States
- Language: English

That Christmas is a 2024 animated Christmas fantasy comedy film directed by Simon Otto (in his directorial debut) and written by Richard Curtis and Peter Souter. Produced by Locksmith Animation, it follows entwined storylines based on short stories from That Christmas and Other Stories by Curtis and illustrator Rebecca Cobb. The voice cast features Brian Cox, Fiona Shaw, Jodie Whittaker and Bill Nighy.

That Christmas premiered at the BFI London Film Festival on 19 October 2024, and was released on Netflix on 4 December 2024. The film received a mixed response from critics.

== Plot ==
In the seaside Suffolk town of Wellington-on-Sea, the townsfolk are preparing to celebrate Christmas, with the activities being organised by Bill, the lighthouse keeper. The story follows three groups: Danny Williams, a shy new boy in town who tries to adjust to his parents' divorce; Sam and Charlie Beccles, identical twin sisters who are respectively anxious and mischievous; and Bernadette McNutt, a spirited local rebel who wants to change things up for the holiday. At the school's Christmas play, Bernadette puts on a more liberal spin, which not many of the parents enjoy. Danny almost misses his cue because he was staring at Sam. Charlie arrives last minute. Danny is upset, but not surprised that his mother has to leave for work. At home, he converses with her through sticky notes about the play and his crush on Sam.

The next morning, the school is closed due to a weather-related cancellation, but Danny is forced to catch up on his studies by his teacher, Ms. Trapper, after his mother fails to notice the alert. During a ten-minute recess, Ms. Trapper teaches Danny how to properly build a snowman and Danny notices that Ms. Trapper is miserable on the way home. On Christmas Eve, Bernadette stays with her younger sister Evie and their friends in a barn near their houses and prepare their annual Christmas traditions while their parents attend a wedding out of town. When the parents leave the reception, they are forced to take the long way home thanks to a snowstorm, but they go off the road and slide down a slope from off a bridge. They inform their children that they will be home in the morning and have them stay together for the night. Danny is called by his father who informs him he is unable to come due to the blizzard.

As Danny sleeps with his mother who comforts him, Santa Claus arrives at Wellington with his sidekick and talking reindeer Dasher and, upon learning about the situations in Danny's life, leaves him behind with his stocking full and a quad bike in front of his house. After learning of Bernadette and her friends’s current events, Santa leaves them with peculiar gifts. Noting that Sam has been nice while Charlie has been naughty, Santa reluctantly leaves Charlie with the presents. Charlie awakes and is overjoyed to find presents but sadly sees Sam's empty stocking and realises they are meant for her sister. When Charlie moves everything to Sam's stocking, Santa gets a reading that Charlie is in fact nice and returns to Wellington. On Christmas Day, Charlie wakes up to find her stocking is full, and finds a button saying "officially nice" inside, but decides to keep it away from her family. Sam later discovers that all of Charlie's mischief was to help her, even developing a plan to get her and Danny together. After discovering their gifts, Bernadette leads them in having the Christmas they want, while Evie follows a flock of turkeys during a game of hide and seek. An overjoyed Danny becomes disheartened when he learns that his mother has to work as Bill's mother is sick. Danny, seeing Ms. Trapper alone, offers to have lunch with her, but she declines and convinces him to see things from his mother's perspective. Meanwhile, the parents struggle to get up from the slope, so they call Ms. Trapper, who enlists Danny's help to convince Farmer Yirrell to get the parents to safety simply by hauling them back to their houses, where they are ultimately greeted by their children and helps Danny make an igloo for his mother. Danny and his mother reconcile and offer Ms. Trapper a place at their table, but she declines and instead looks through a book of pictures from the early 1980s of Ms. Trapper with Jamie, her late husband who died in the Falklands War in 1982.

The parents notice that Evie is missing and they search for her, getting the town involved in their search. Ms. Trapper enlists Danny to take her to the McNutt house where she takes up the command. As Sam and Charlie run into Danny and join in on his quad bike, the trio enlists Bill to help find Evie. Fortunately, Bill flashes the light on a set of footprints and the group follow them to a row of beach huts, where they find Evie sheltering with several turkeys. After Bernadette and Evie's parents arrive, Bernadette apologizes to her mother for losing Evie, but she forgives her. Upon learning that Danny thought of using the lighthouse, Bernadette hails him a hero and Danny asks out Sam. On Boxing Day, Bill goes to the beach to swim in the cold ocean with half the town arriving to enjoy themselves.

== Cast ==
- Brian Cox as Santa Claus
- Fiona Shaw as Ms. Trapper
- Jodie Whittaker as Mrs. Williams
- Lolly Adefope as Mrs. McNutt
- Alex Macqueen as Mr. Forrest
- Katherine Parkinson as Mrs. Forrest
- Sindhu Vee as Mrs. Mulji
- Rosie Cavaliero as Mrs. Beccles
- Paul Kaye as Farmer Yirrell
- Guz Khan as Dasher
- Andy Nyman as Mr. Beccles
- Bill Nighy as Bill
- Rhys Darby as Mr. McNutt
- Jordan North and Dermot O'Leary as Mr. Hack and Mr. Chop in cameo appearances

== Production ==
In November 2019, it was announced that Locksmith Animation was developing The Empty Stocking, an animated feature film based on the children's Christmas book trilogy That Christmas and Other Stories written by Richard Curtis and illustrated by Rebecca Cobb. On 14 June 2021, Locksmith announced that Simon Otto would be directing the film, in his directorial debut, which had been retitled That Christmas. In May 2022, Locksmith confirmed that it awarded the digital production of the film to DNEG Animation, following their collaboration on Locksmith's first animated feature film Ron's Gone Wrong (2021). Also in May 2022, Nicole P. Hearon and Adam Tandy were announced as producers for the film with Curtis, Cobb, Bonnie Arnold, Lara Breay, Javier Hernáez, Mary Coleman, Natalie Fischer, Colin Hopkins, Julie Lockhart, Elisabeth Murdoch and Sarah Smith as executive producers. In November 2023, it was announced that John Powell would compose the film's musical score. On 20 March 2024, Brian Cox, Fiona Shaw, Jodie Whittaker and Bill Nighy were announced to star in the film. In August 2024, it was announced that English singer-songwriter Ed Sheeran would write and contribute a song for the film, titled "Under the Tree".

== Soundtrack ==
That Christmas (Soundtrack from the Netflix Film) is the film's soundtrack album, containing John Powell's musical score with some additional music composed by Batu Sener, Anthony Willis, Ed Sheeran, Johnny McDaid and Markus Siegel. The soundtrack was mixed at 5 Cat Studios in Los Angeles, California, recorded at Abbey Road Studios in London, England and was digitally released on Netflix Music on 4 December 2024. Sheeran and McDaid's song "Under the Tree", which is featured in the film and not featured on its soundtrack, was released as a non-album digital single on 26 November 2024 by Gingerbread Man Records.

== Release ==
In June 2022, it was announced that Netflix would handle worldwide distribution rights for the film under the Netflix Animation label after originally announcing a new deal with Warner Bros. Pictures and Warner Animation Group in October 2019. That Christmas premiered at the 68th BFI London Film Festival on 19 October 2024 and was released on Netflix on 4 December 2024.

== Reception ==
=== Critical response ===
On the review aggregator website Rotten Tomatoes, 67% of 43 critics' reviews are positive, with an average rating of 5.9/10. The website's consensus reads: "More of a stocking stuffer than a proper gift from Santa, That Christmas is an amiable enough addition to the holiday canon." Metacritic, which uses a weighted average, assigned the film a score of 60 out of 100, based on 13 critics, indicating "mixed or average" reviews. Tim Cogshell of FilmWeek wrote "I don't particularly care for the doll-like animation, but there's a couple notions in this movie that I like: one, that not everybody likes Christmas, and two, that "naughty" is subjective." Helen O'Hara of Empire gave the film three out of five stars and wrote "The stories are all individually charming, but overly familiar animation and underwhelming character-design blunt the effect."

Jacob Oller of The A.V. Club gave the film a grade "D", calling it "schmaltz-heavy and wishlist-thin" and saying that "That Christmas offers very little and doesn't even have the self-awareness to include the receipt." Peter Bradshaw of The Guardian gave the film two out of five stars and said "It's all more or less sufferable, and it may well keep young children quiet at Christmas... but we surely needed a higher joke content." Ed Potton of The Times gave the film two out of five stars and said "That Christmas is like a neutered Motherland, or Pixar but lobotomised and dressed by Boden." Robbie Collin of The Daily Telegraph gave the film three out of five stars and wrote "... The writing's sentimental and/or smirky longueurs are remedied by the animation itself, whose cosy charm has a distinctly British sensibility – from the architecture to the landscape and even the colour palettes, everything is satisfyingly just right." Wendy Ide of Screen International wrote "The film looks terrific... And while the story itself might not hold any surprises, it's big-hearted and generous with its happy endings."

Peter Debruge of Variety wrote "Adapted from a trio of picture books by "Love Actually" scribe Richard Curtis, the feel-good family film is chock-full of kids second-guessing their worth — and not just in the naughty-or-nice department either." Lovia Gyarkye of The Hollywood Reporter wrote "For all its narrative preoccupations, That Christmas rarely feels like it's shortchanging any set of characters or their arcs." Kate Erbland of IndieWire gave the film a grade "B+" and wrote "The old chestnuts hold true for this one, the goofy holiday puns: it's a gift well worth unwrapping and sharing with the ones you love most." William Bibbiani of TheWrap called That Christmas "an ordinary feature that could have been extraordinary as a series of three shorts."

=== Award nominations ===
| Award | Year | Category | Recipient(s) | Result | Ref. |
|---|---|---|---|---|---|
| 15th Hollywood Music in Media Awards | 2024 | Best Original Score in an Animated Film | John Powell | Nominated | |
| IFMCA Awards | 2025 | Best Original Score for an Animated Film | John Powell | Nominated | |
| 52nd Annie Awards | 2025 | Best Animated Feature | That Christmas | Nominated | |
| 52nd Annie Awards | 2025 | Outstanding Achievement for Character Design in an Animated Feature | Uwe Heidschötter | Nominated | |
| 52nd Annie Awards | 2025 | Outstanding Achievement for Directing in an Animated Feature | Simon Otto | Nominated | |
| 52nd Annie Awards | 2025 | Outstanding Achievement for Music in an Animated Feature | John Powell, Ed Sheeran and Johnny McDaid | Nominated | |
| 52nd Annie Awards | 2025 | Outstanding Achievement for Production Design on an Animated Feature | Justin Hutchinson-Chatburn and Mike Redman | Nominated | |
| 52nd Annie Awards | 2025 | Outstanding Achievement for Storyboarding in an Animated Feature | Lorenzo Fresta, Ashley Boddy and Helen Schroeder | Nominated | |
| 4th Children's and Family Emmy Awards | 2026 | Outstanding Animated Special | That Christmas | Nominated | |
| 4th Children's and Family Emmy Awards | 2026 | Outstanding Music Direction and Composition for an Animated Program | John Powell | Nominated | |
| 4th Children's and Family Emmy Awards | 2026 | Outstanding Editing for an Animated Program | Sim Evan-Jones | Nominated | |
