= Locksmith Animation =

British animation studio

Locksmith Animation Limited
- Logo used since 2023
- Type: Subsidiary
- Industry: Computer animation Film production
- Predecessor: Wishmaker Animation Ltd. (2013–2014)
- Founded: January 31, 2014; 12 years ago
- Founder: Sarah Smith; Julie Lockhart; Elisabeth Murdoch (financial backing)
- Headquarters: 113 Regent's Park Road, London, England
- Number of locations: 9255 Sunset Boulevard, West Hollywood, California
- Key people: Julie Lockhart (president of prod.); Natalie Fischer (CEO); Mary Coleman (CCO); Britt Gardiner (COO); Daphne Mather (Head of Culture); Doug Ikeler (CTO/SVP Digital Prod.); Shelley Page (Head of Talent)
- Products: Feature films
- Number of employees: 100+ (2025)
- Parent: Sister
- Divisions: Locksmith Animation Music Ltd.; Locksmith Films Ltd.
- Website: www.locksmithanimation.com

Locksmith Animation Limited is a British animation studio and film production company owned by Sister. Headquartered in London with an office in Los Angeles since 2023, Locksmith is best known for producing and developing independent computer-animated feature films.

Locksmith Animation's first film, Ron's Gone Wrong, was released on 22 October 2021, distributed by 20th Century Studios (which had recently been acquired by Disney two years prior) with positive reviews. That Christmas, a holiday film based on the children's Christmas book trilogy That Christmas and Other Stories by Richard Curtis and Rebecca Cobb, was released by Netflix on 4 December 2024. The studio's next films are, Bad Fairies, a subversive original musical-comedy film set in contemporary London, to be released by Warner Bros. Pictures on 21 May 2027, The Lunar Chronicles, based on Marissa Meyer's book series of the same name, to be released also by Warner Bros. Pictures on November 3, 2028, and Wed Wabbit, based on Lissa Evans' children's book of the same name, and their first independent feature, to be funded and release by themselves.

== History ==
Locksmith Animation was founded in January 31, 2014 by media executive businesswoman Elisabeth Murdoch and two Aardman Animations collaborators Sarah Smith and Julie Lockhart. Locksmith was originally named after Lockhart and Smith's surnames. In April 2014, visual effects studio Double Negative (now known as DNEG) formed a deal with Locksmith to provide the computer animation for Locksmith's films, following this DNEG formed their own in-house animation studio.

The early logo of Locksmith Animation used from 2014 to 2017

In May 2016, Locksmith formed a production deal with Paramount Pictures, with Paramount acting as the distributor for Locksmith's films to be produced under the Paramount Animation label. The following year, however, Paramount abandoned its deal with Locksmith when Paramount chairman and CEO Brad Grey was replaced by Jim Gianopulos.

In September 2017, Locksmith formed a multi-year production deal with 20th Century Fox, which would distribute Locksmith's films; 20th Century Fox Animation was brought in to oversee the deal, as Locksmith was aiming to release a film every 12–18 months. The deal was to bolster Blue Sky's output and replace the loss of distributing DreamWorks Animation films, which are now owned and distributed by Universal Pictures, following its takeover by NBCUniversal in 2016. The first film to be produced by Locksmith Animation was Ron's Gone Wrong which was released on 22 October 2021 by 20th Century Studios. In February 2018, it was announced that Locksmith was developing Wed Wabbit, a live-action/animated hybrid film based on Lissa Evans' children's book, originally served as the first live-action/animated hybrid film from Locksmith. In October 2019, after Disney acquired Fox, Locksmith formed a new multi-year production deal with Warner Bros. Pictures, which would distribute three Locksmith films under the Warner Animation Group label after the release of Ron's Gone Wrong, which was now the only theatrical Locksmith film to be distributed by 20th Century Studios.

The original logo of Locksmith Animation (used from 2017 to 2023) with the Sister byline (used from 2021 to 2023)

Sister was announced as Locksmith Animation's parent company following the release of Ron's Gone Wrong in October 2021.

In June 2021, it was announced that Natalie Fischer, the former COO of Illumination Entertainment, DreamWorks Animation and Pixar would step in as CEO. Locksmith co-founder Sarah Smith exited the company to pursue her own creative endeavours. It was also announced that Locksmith is currently in production on That Christmas, a holiday film based on the children's Christmas book trilogy That Christmas and Other Stories by Richard Curtis and Rebecca Cobb, an original musical-comedy film. In June 2022 Netflix unveiled That Christmas as part of its 2022 slate of animated films.

In January 2022, Locksmith had optioned to adapt Marissa Meyer's book series The Lunar Chronicles.

In June 2023, as part of the rebranding of Warner Animation Group (now called Warner Bros. Pictures Animation), it was announced that the studio had signed a first-look deal with Locksmith to develop and produce the two animated feature films Bad Fairies and The Lunar Chronicles for Warner Bros. Pictures.

In November 2025, it was announced that Locksmith now aims to release one feature film a year beginning with Bad Fairies, and developing more feature films after the release of Wed Wabbit.

== Films ==
Release timeline
2021	Ron's Gone Wrong
2022
2023
2024	That Christmas
2025
2026
2027	Bad Fairies
2028	The Lunar Chronicles
TBA	Wed Wabbit

=== Feature films ===
==== Released ====
Year	Title	Director(s)	Writer(s)	Producer(s)	Composer(s)	Distributor	Special effects studio	Note
2021	Ron's Gone Wrong	Sarah Smith; Jean-Philippe Vine Co-director: Octavio E. Rodriguez	Peter Baynham; Sarah Smith	Julie Lockhart; Lara Breay	Henry Jackman	20th Century Studios	DNEG Animation	First feature film
2024	That Christmas	Simon Otto	Richard Curtis; Peter Souter	Nicole P. Hearon; Adam Tandy	John Powell	Netflix	DNEG Animation	Based on That Christmas and Other Stories by Richard Curtis and Rebecca Cobb

==== Upcoming ====
Year	Title	Director(s)	Writer(s)	Producer(s)	Composer(s)	Distributor	Special effects studio	Note
2027	Bad Fairies	Megan Nicole Dong Co-director: Olivier Staphylas	Deborah Frances-White; Zoë Tomalin	Carolyn Soper	Score: Isabella Summers Songs: Toby Marlow; Lucy Moss	Warner Bros. Pictures	DNEG Animation	
2028	The Lunar Chronicles	Noëlle Raffaele	Lindsey Ferrentino; Kalen Egan; Travis Sentell	Christina Steinberg	TBA	Warner Bros. Pictures	Industrial Light & Magic	Based on the book series of the same name by Marissa Meyer
TBA	Wed Wabbit	Olly Reid	Gideon Defoe	Julie Lockhart; Andrew Baker	TBA	Sky Cinema	—N/a	Based on the book of the same name by Lissa Evans

=== Short films ===
Year	Title	Director	Writer	Producer	Composer	Special effects studio(s)	Note
2025	Cardboard	J.P. Vine		Michaela Manas Malina	Hugo Brijs	DNEG Animation; Ritzy Animation	First short film

== Reception ==
=== Box office gross ===
Year	Film	USA gross	Worldwide gross
2021	Ron's Gone Wrong	$23 million	$60.7 million

=== Critical reception ===
Year	Film	Rotten Tomatoes	Metacritic	CinemaScore
2021	Ron's Gone Wrong	82% (103 reviews)	65 (23 reviews)	A
2024	That Christmas	66% (41 reviews)	60 (13 reviews)	—N/a

=== Accolades ===
==== Annie Awards ====
Year	Film	Category	Recipient(s)	Result
2021	Ron's Gone Wrong	Outstanding Achievement for Character Design in a Feature Production	Julien Bizat	Nominated
2021	Ron's Gone Wrong	Outstanding Achievement for Production Design in an Animated Feature Production	Aurélien Predal, Till Nowak and Nathan Crowley	Nominated
2025	That Christmas	Best Animated Feature	That Christmas	Nominated
2025	That Christmas	Outstanding Achievement for Character Design in an Animated Feature	Uwe Heidschötter	Nominated
2025	That Christmas	Outstanding Achievement for Directing in an Animated Feature	Simon Otto	Nominated
2025	That Christmas	Outstanding Achievement for Music in an Animated Feature	John Powell, Ed Sheeran and Johnny McDaid	Nominated
2025	That Christmas	Outstanding Achievement for Production Design on an Animated Feature	Justin Hutchinson-Chatburn and Mike Redman	Nominated
2025	That Christmas	Outstanding Achievement for Storyboarding in an Animated Feature	Lorenzo Fresta, Ashley Boddy and Helen Schroeder	Nominated

==== British Animation Awards ====
Year	Film	Category	Recipient(s)	Result
2022	Ron's Gone Wrong	Best Long Form	Sarah Smith, Jean-Philippe Vine and Octavio E. Rodriguez	Won
2022	Ron's Gone Wrong	Best Design	Sarah Smith, Jean-Philippe Vine and Octavio E. Rodriguez	Won
2022	Ron's Gone Wrong	Writers Award	Sarah Smith and Peter Baynham	Nominated
