= 52nd Annie Awards =

US media awards ceremony held in 2025

- Date: February 8, 2025
- Site: Royce Hall; Los Angeles, California, U.S.
- Organized by: ASIFA-Hollywood

Highlights
- Best Animated Feature: The Wild Robot
- Best Direction: Chris Sanders; The Wild Robot
- Most awards: The Wild Robot (9)
- Most nominations: Film: The Wild Robot (10); Television: Arcane (7)

The 52nd Annual Annie Awards honoring excellence in the field of animation of 2024 was held on February 8, 2025, at the University of California, Los Angeles's Royce Hall in Los Angeles, California, presenting awards in 32 competitive categories as well as four juried special awards.

Nominees were revealed on December 20, 2024. DreamWorks Animation's The Wild Robot, directed by Chris Sanders and adapted from the novel by Peter Brown, led the nominations with 10, followed by Inside Out 2 and Wallace & Gromit: Vengeance Most Fowl, both with seven apiece. In the television categories, Netflix series Arcane, based on the Riot Games multiplayer video game League of Legends, led with seven nominations, followed by Dream Productions with six and Tales of the Teenage Mutant Ninja Turtles with five.

During the ceremony, two fire alarms were set off forcing everyone to leave the building and the live show was delayed for minutes.

== Winners and nominees ==
=== Productions categories ===
Best Animated Feature	Best Animated Feature — Independent
The Wild Robot (DreamWorks Animation); Inside Out 2 (Pixar Animation Studios); Kung Fu Panda 4 (DreamWorks Animation); That Christmas (Locksmith Animation and Netflix); Ultraman: Rising (Netflix presents in association with Tsuburaya Productions); Wallace & Gromit: Vengeance Most Fowl (Aardman and Netflix)	Flow (Sacrebleu Productions, Take Five, Dream Well Studio, and Janus Films); Chicken for Linda! (Dolce Vita Films, Miyu Productions, Palosanto Films, France 3 Cinéma, and GKIDS); Kensuke's Kingdom (Lupus Films, Luxembourg Film Fund, Ffilm Cymru Wales, Bumpybox, BFI, Align, Mésuline Productions, Jigsaw Films, and Le Pacte); Look Back (Studio Durian and GKIDS); Mars Express (Everybody on Deck, Je Suis Bien Content, and GKIDS); Memoir of a Snail (Snails Pace Films, Arenamedia, and IFC Films)
Best Special Production	Best Short Subject
Orion and the Dark (DreamWorks Animation); A Bear Named Wojtek (The Illuminated Film Company and Filmograf); Mog's Christmas (Lupus Films); Tabby McTat (Magic Light Pictures); Yuck! (Ikki Films and Iliade et Films)	Wander to Wonder (Circe Films, Kaap Holland Film, Les Productions de Milou, Beast Animation, Blink Industries, and Pictanovo); Beautiful Men (Animal Tank, Miyu Productions, and Ka-Ching Cartoons); In the Shadow of the Cypress (Barfak Animation Studio); Ruthless Blade (IDEOMOTOR Culture Media Co., Ltd.); The Swineherd (Fleng Entertainment and Tumblehead Productions)
Best Sponsored	Best Animated Television/Broadcast Production for Preschool Children
Fuzzy Feelings (Passion Pictures, Hungry Manne); feelslikeimfallinginlove (Blinkink); Moonlit Bamboo Forest (Passion Paris Production, and HoYoFair); Natlan Impressions Trailer: "Blaze to Natlan" (BUCK); Welcome to the City of Love (Nexus Studios)	The Tiny Chef Show: "Tiny Chef's Spooky Stump Spectacular" (Imagine Entertainment, Tiny Chef Productions, and Nickelodeon Productions / Nickelodeon); Disney Jr.'s Ariel: "Crystal Cavern Caper" (Wild Canary Animation and Disney Branded Television / Disney Jr.); Gabby's Dollhouse: "Pandy's Bad Day" (DreamWorks Animation / Netflix); Jessica's Big Little World: "Jessica's Picnic" (Cartoon Network Studios / Cartoon Network); Wonder Pets: In the City: "Save Tate?" (Nickelodeon Production / Apple TV+)
Best Animated Television/Broadcast Production for Children	Best Mature Audience Animated Television/Broadcast Production
Marvel's Moon Girl and Devil Dinosaur: "The Molecular Level" (Flying Bark Productions, Disney Television Animation, and Disney Branded Television / Disney Channel); Gremlins: The Wild Batch: "Never Use Double Negatives" (Warner Bros. Animation / Max); Jurassic World: Chaos Theory: "Batten Down the Hatches" (DreamWorks Animation / Netflix); Primos: "Summer of Tater Luna" (Disney Television Animation and Disney Branded Television / Disney Channel); WondLa: "Ruins" (Skydance Animation / Apple TV+)	Bob's Burgers: "They Slug Horses, Don’t They?" (20th Television Animation / Fox); The Great North: "Aunt Misbehavin' Adventure" (20th Television Animation / Fox); The Second Best Hospital in the Galaxy: "The Land of Sex and Death" (Amazon MGM Studios and Titmouse Studios / Amazon Prime Video); Solar Opposites: "The What If?! Device" (20th Television Animation / Hulu); South Park: "The End of Obesity" (MTV Entertainment Studios / Paramount+)
Best Limited Series	Best Student Film
Dream Productions: "A Night to Remember" (Pixar Animation Studios / Disney+); Iwájú: "Tola" (Walt Disney Animation Studios / Disney+); Lego Star Wars: Rebuild the Galaxy: "Part Three" (Lucasfilm / Disney+); Moon Girl's Lab: "Moon Girl Saves the Moon" (Disney Television Animation and Disney Branded Television / Disney Channel); My Adventures with Superman: "Pierce the Heavens, Superman!" (Warner Bros. Animation / Adult Swim)	Adiós – José Prats, director; Bernardo Angeletti, producer (National Film and Television School); El Ombligo de la Luna – Sara António, Julia Grupińska, Bokang Koatja, Tian Westraad, Ezequiel Garibay, directors (Gobelins); Pear Garden – Shadab Shayegan, director and producer (Filmakademie Baden-Württemberg GmbH, Animationsinstitut); Polliwog – Julia Skala, director; Max Pollmann, producer (Filmakademie Baden-Württemberg GmbH, Animationsinstitut); Turmspringer – Oscar Bittner, director; Andra Berila, producer (Filmakademie Baden-Württemberg GmbH, Animationsinstitut)

=== Individual achievement categories ===
Outstanding Achievement for Animated Effects in an Animated Television/Broadcast Production	Outstanding Achievement for Animated Effects in an Animated Production
Arcane: "The Dirt Under Your Nails" – Guillaume Degroote, Aurélien Ressencourt, Adam Bachiri, Guillaume Zaouche, and Jérôme Dupré (Netflix); Dream Productions: "A Night to Remember" – Gary Bruins, Jongwon Pak, Arturo Aguilar, Alan Browning, and Alen Lai (Disney+); Secret Level: "Crossfire: Good Conflict" – Kamil Murzyn, Rafał Rumiński, Jarosław Armata, Michał Śledź, and Michał Firek (Amazon Prime Video); Secret Level: "Dungeons & Dragons: The Queen's Cradle" – Arthur Loiseau, Tom O'Bready, Esteban Genre, Alexandre Lerouge, and Guillaume Grelier Star (Amazon Prime Video); Secret Level: "Warhammer 40,000: And They Shall Know No Fear" – Josh Schwartz, Joe Coleman, Michael Huang, Guilherme Casagrandi, and Raul Rodrigues (Amazon Prime Video)	The Wild Robot – Derek Cheung, Michael Losure, David Chow, Nyoung Kim, and Steve Avoujageli; Kung Fu Panda 4 – Zachary Glynn, Alex Timchenko, Kiem Ching Ong, Yorie Kaela Kumalasari, and Jinguang Huang; Moana 2 – Santiago Robles, Marc Bryant, Deborah Carlson, Jake Rice, and Ian J. Coony; Ultraman: Rising – Goncalo Cabaca, Vishal Patel, Zheng Yong Oh, Nicholas Yoon Joo Kuang, and Pei-Zhi Huang Huang; Wallace & Gromit: Vengeance Most Fowl – Howard Jones, Rich Spence, Deborah Jane Price, Jon Biggins, and Kirstie Deane
Outstanding Achievement for Character Animation in an Animated Television / Broadcast Production	Outstanding Achievement for Character Animation in an Animated Feature Production
Arcane: "Killing is a Cycle", "Heavy is the Crown", "Finally Got the Name Right", "The Message Hidden Within the Pattern", "The Dirt Under Your Nails", "Pretend Like It's the First Time", "Blisters and Bedrock" – Tom Gouill (Netflix); Dream Productions: "The Dream Team", "Out of Body", "Romance!" – Travis Hathaway (Disney+); In the Know: "Yogurt Week", "Thinksgiving" – Jeff Riley (Peacock); The Patrick Star Show: "Something Stupid This Way Comes" – Colin Lepper (Nickelodeon); Star Trek: Lower Decks: "Various episodes" – Raymond Dunster (Paramount+)	The Wild Robot – Fabio Lignini; Inside Out 2 – Aviv Mano; Kung Fu Panda 4 – Patrick Guisiano; Moana 2 – Brian Scott; Wallace & Gromit: Vengeance Most Fowl – Carmen Bromfield Mason
Outstanding Achievement for Character Animation in a Live Action Production	Outstanding Achievement for Character Animation in a Video Game
Kingdom of the Planet of the Apes – Christian Kickenweitz, Aidan Martin, Allison Orr, Radiya Alam, and Howard Sly; Better Man – Shaun Freeman, Luisma Lavin Peredo, Carlos Lin, Seoungseok Charlie Kim, and Kaori Miyazawa; Gladiator II – Kyle Dunlevy, Philipp Winterstein, Gil Daniel, Michael Elder, and Julien Bagory; Godzilla x Kong: The New Empire – Ludovic Chailloleau, Jonathan Paquin, Craig Penn, Florian Fernandez, and Marco Barbati; House of the Dragon (Season 2) – Jason Snyman, Manjoe Chan, Chloe McLean, Cedric Enriquez Canlas, and Vincent Lee	Neva – Nomada Studio Animation Team; #BLUD – Chris Burns and Bob Fox; Asgard's Wrath 2 – Sanzaru Games Animation Team; Diesel Legacy – Maximum Entertainment; Senua's Saga: Hellblade II – Ninja Theory
Outstanding Achievement for Character Design in an Animated Television / Broadcast Production	Outstanding Achievement for Character Design in an Animated Feature Production
Marvel's Moon Girl and Devil Dinosaur: "The Molecular Level" – Jose Lopez (Disney Channel); Dream Productions: "A Night to Remember" – Grant Alexander (Disney+); Jentry Chau vs. the Underworld: "Pilot" – Kal Athannassov (Netflix); Tales of the Teenage Mutant Ninja Turtles: "Bishop Makes Her Move!" – Rustam Hasanov (Paramount+); X-Men '97: "Mutant Liberation Begins" – Amelia Vidal (Disney+)	The Wild Robot – Genevieve Tsai; Inside Out 2 – Deanna Marsigliese; Scarygirl – Nathan Jurevicius; Spellbound – Guillermo Ramíre; That Christmas – Uwe Heidschötter
Outstanding Achievement for Directing in an Animated Television / Broadcast Production	Outstanding Achievement for Directing in an Animated Feature Production
Arcane: "The Dirt Under Your Nails" – Arnaud Delord, Pascal Charrue, and Bart Maunoury (Netflix); Big City Greens the Movie: Spacecation – Anna O'Brian (Disney Channel); Bob's Burgers: "They Slug Horses, Don't They?" – Bernard Derriman (Fox); Tabby McTat – Jac Hamman and Sarah Scrimgeour (BBC One); Tales of the Teenage Mutant Ninja Turtles: "The Pearl" – Alan Wan and Colin Heck (Paramount+)	The Wild Robot – Chris Sanders; Chicken for Linda! – Chiara Malta and Sébastien Laudenbach; Flow – Gints Zilbalodis; That Christmas – Simon Otto; Wallace & Gromit: Vengeance Most Fowl – Nick Park and Merlin Crossingham
Outstanding Achievement for Editorial in an Animated Television / Broadcast Production	Outstanding Achievement for Editorial in an Animated Feature Production
Arcane: "Pretend Like It's the First Time" – Nazim Meslem, Gilad Carmel, and Roberto Fernandez (Netflix); Creature Commandos: "Cheers to the Tin Man" – Annie De Brock (Max); Jurassic World: Chaos Theory: "Batten Down the Hatches" – Ben Choo, Rich Liverance, Eric Hendricks, Anna Adams, and Ian Hurley (Netflix); Marvel's Moon Girl and Devil Dinosaur: "The Molecular Level" – Sandra Powers, Phil Lomboy, Ryan Burkhard, Neil Wilson III, and Gabriel Gelbrecht (Disney Channel); Tales of the Teenage Mutant Ninja Turtles: "The Pearl" – Caleb Yoder (Paramount+)	The Wild Robot – Mary Blee, Collin Erker, Orlando Duenas, Lucie Lyon, and Brian Parker; Inside Out 2 – Maurissa Horwitz, David Suther, Fiona Toth, and Jonathan Vargo; Moana 2 – Jeremy Milton and Michael Louis Hill; Ultraman: Rising – Bret Marnell, William Max Steinberg, Nik Siefke, Ryan Sommer, and Kaye Speare; Wallace & Gromit: Vengeance Most Fowl – Dan Hembery
Outstanding Achievement for Music in an Animated Television / Broadcast Production	Outstanding Achievement for Music in an Animated Feature Production
Arcane: "The Dirt Under Your Nails" – Ryan Jillian Santiago, Alexander Seaver, and Simon Wilcox (Netflix); Big City Greens the Movie: Spacecation – Joachim Horsley (Disney Channel); Hazbin Hotel: "Masquerade" – Sam Haft and Andrew Underberg (Amazon Prime Video); Jentry Chau vs. the Underworld: "Lock-In" – Brian H. Kim (Netflix); WondLa: "Captive" – Joy Ngiaw (Apple TV+)	The Wild Robot – Kris Bowers; Kensuke's Kingdom – Stuart Hancock; Piece by Piece – Pharrell Williams and Michael Andrews; That Christmas – John Powell, Ed Sheeran and Johnny McDaid; Wallace & Gromit: Vengeance Most Fowl – Lorne Balfe and Julian Nott
Outstanding Achievement for Production Design in an Animated Television / Broadcast Production	Outstanding Achievement for Production Design in an Animated Feature Production
Arcane: "The Dirt Under Your Nails" – Arnaud-Loris Baudry, Julien Georgel, Faustine Dumontier, and Charlotte O'Neil (Netflix); Dream Productions: "The Dream Team" – Bert Berry and Josh Holtsclaw (Disney+); Orion and the Dark – Timothy Lamb and Christine Bian (Netflix); Silly Sundays: "Stringy Soup" – Fran Bravo and Rosa Ballester Cabo (Cartoon Network); WondLa: "Bargain" – Andy Harkness (Apple TV+)	The Wild Robot – Raymond Zibach and Ritchie Sacilioc; Inside Out 2 – Jason Deamer, Josh West, Keiko Murayama, Bill Zahn, and Laura Meyer; That Christmas – Justin Hutchinson-Chatburn and Mike Redman; Ultraman: Rising – Ultraman: Rising Production Design Team; Wallace & Gromit: Vengeance Most Fowl – Matt Perry, Darren Dubicki, Richard Edmunds, Matt Sanders, and Gavin Lines
Outstanding Achievement for Storyboarding in an Animated Television / Broadcast Production	Outstanding Achievement for Storyboarding in an Animated Feature Production
Arcane: "Killing is a Cycle" – Joséphine Meis (Netflix); Invincible Fight Girl: "The Way of the World" – Gladyfaith Abcede, Miki Brewster, Kaela Lash, and Sheldon Vella (Adult Swim); Jurassic World: Chaos Theory: "That Night" – Aevery Huens (Netflix); Snoopy Presents: Welcome Home, Franklin – David Lux (Apple TV+); Tales of the Teenage Mutant Ninja Turtles: "The Pearl" – Laura Gille, Sebrina Gao, and Kevin Molina-Ortiz (Paramount+)	Despicable Me 4 – Habib Louati; Moana 2 – Ryan Green; Saving Bikini Bottom: The Sandy Cheeks Movie – Piero Piluso; Spellbound – Alex Relloso Horna and Carlos Zapater Oliva; That Christmas – Ashley Boddy, Lorenzo Fresta and Helen Schroeder
Outstanding Achievement for Voice Acting in an Animated Television / Broadcast Production	Outstanding Achievement for Voice Acting in an Animated Feature Production
Paula Pell - Dream Productions: “Out of the Body" as Paula Persimmon (Disney+); Ayo Edebiri – Tales of the Teenage Mutant Ninja Turtles: "Splinter and April Fight a Goldfish" as April O'Neil (Paramount+); John Roberts – Bob's Burgers: "The Right Tough Stuff" as Linda Belcher (Fox); Kristen Schaal – Bob's Burgers: "They Slug Horses, Don't They?" as Louise Belcher (Fox); Jeremy Jordan - Hazbin Hotel: "Dad Beat Dad" as Lucifer Morningstar (Amazon Prime Video)	Lupita Nyong'o – The Wild Robot as Roz; Kit Connor – The Wild Robot as Brightbill; Maya Hawke – Inside Out 2 as Anxiety; Brian Tyree Henry – Transformers One as D-16 / Megatron; Mélinée Leclerc – Chicken for Linda! as Linda
Outstanding Achievement for Writing in an Animated Television / Broadcast Production	Outstanding Achievement for Writing in an Animated Feature Production
Orion and the Dark – Charlie Kaufman (Netflix); Craig of the Creek: "Whose Dimension Is It Anyway?" – Harron Atkins, Lorraine DeGraffenreidt, Pearl Low, and Richie Pope (Cartoon Network); Jessica's Big Little World: "Jessica's Picnic" – Austin Faber, Gabriel Franklin, Shawneé Gibbs, Shawnelle Gibbs, and Ashleigh Crystal Hairston (Cartoon Network); The Simpsons: "Bart's Birthday" – Jessica Conrad (Fox); Yuck! – Loïc Espuche (Ikki Films, Iliade et Films)	Flow – Gints Zilbalodis and Matīss Kaža; Inside Out 2 – Meg LeFauve and Dave Holstein; Kensuke's Kingdom – Frank Cottrell-Boyce; Memoir of a Snail – Adam Elliot

== Juried awards ==
=== June Foray Award ===
- For "significant and benevolent impact":
  - Women in Animation, global non-profit advocating for gender equity and inclusion in animation, VFX, and gaming.

=== The Special Achievement Award ===
- Presented to "acknowledge unique and outstanding achievement not recognized within the existing award category structure":
  - The book The Original Directors of Walt's Animated Films by Pete Docter and Don Peri.

=== Ub Iwerks Award ===
- For "technical advancement affecting the animation industry":
  - Alberto Menache, visual effects, animation and gaming pioneer.

=== Winsor McCay Lifetime Achievement Awards ===
- In "recognition of lifetime or career contributions":
  - Aaron Blaise, supervising animator, director, and educator.
  - Eunice Macaulay, writer, director, and producer at NFB (posthumous award).
  - Normand Roger, composer and sound designer at NFB.

== Multiple awards and nominations ==
=== Films ===
The following films received multiple nominations:

Nominations	Film
10	The Wild Robot
7	Inside Out 2
7	Wallace & Gromit: Vengeance Most Fowl
6	That Christmas
4	Moana 2
4	Ultraman: Rising
3	Chicken for Linda!
3	Flow
3	Kensuke's Kingdom
3	Kung Fu Panda 4
3	Orion and the Dark
2	Big City Greens the Movie: Spacecation
2	Memoir of a Snail
2	Spellbound
2	Tabby McTat
2	Yuck!

The following films received multiple awards:

Wins	Film
9	The Wild Robot
2	Flow
2	Orion and the Dark

=== Television/Broadcast ===
The following shows received multiple nominations:

Nominations	Show
7	Arcane
6	Dream Productions
5	Tales of the Teenage Mutant Ninja Turtles
4	Bob's Burgers
3	Jurassic World: Chaos Theory
3	Marvel's Moon Girl and Devil Dinosaur
3	Secret Level
3	WondLa
2	Hazbin Hotel
2	Jentry Chau vs. the Underworld
2	Jessica's Big Little World

The following shows received multiple awards:

Wins	Show
7	Arcane
2	Dream Productions
2	Marvel's Moon Girl and Devil Dinosaur
