= Poop (picture book) =

2004 British children's book

Poop: A Natural History of the Unmentionable
- Author: Nicola Davies
- Illustrator: Neal Layton
- Language: English
- Genre: Children's literature
- Publisher: Candlewick
- Publication date: 3 August 2004
- Publication place: United Kingdom
- Media type: Print (hardcover)
- Pages: 64
- ISBN: 978-0-7636-2437-8
- Dewey Decimal: 573.4/9 22
- LC Class: QP159 .D38 2004

Poop: A Natural History of the Unmentionable is a children's book about (animal) feces, written by Nicola Davies and illustrated by Neal Layton. The book gives info about the nature, production, variety, and manifold uses of animal poop. The book analyzes styles, sizes, uses, and smells of animal poop. It is an instructional guide on bathroom self-reliance. It tells how naturalists study poop to determine animal diets and how paleontologists analyze fossilized poop to learn about prehistoric animals.

== Reception ==
A Kirkus Reviews review says, "Though Layton's crudely drawn cartoon illustrations provide more jocular side commentary than actual information, this breezy introduction will give young readers with a certain tolerance for (or attraction to) the yuckier side of natural history the scoop on poop—at least in the animal kingdom." Betty Carter of Horn Book Magazine reviewed the book saying, "Playful, but filled with information, scientific work, and helpful maps and diagrams, this book takes poop out of the sewers and into the scientific community where it belongs." Blair Christolon, of School Library Journal, commented, "For nonfiction readers who have difficulty finding something of interest to read, this book is sure to catch their attention."

== See also ==
- Everyone Poops
- Flush!: The Scoop on Poop throughout the Ages
