= Neal Layton =

British author

Neal Layton is a British illustrator of children's books including Oscar and Arabella (2002) and Bartholomew and the Bug (2004) which won both the Nestlé Smarties Book Prize Bronze Awards.

== Education ==
He was born in Chichester. He has a BA in Graphic Design (Northumbria University) and a MA in Illustration (Central Saint Martins).

== Career ==
He is best known for his association with Cressida Cowell as the illustrator of the Emily Brown books. The Rabbit Belongs to Emily Brown appeared on the Booktrust Best 100 Children's Book list from the last 100 years.

Other notable collaborations include books with the author Michael Rosen, including illustrations for Uncle Gobb and the Dread Shed, which won the Sheffield Children’s Book Award in 2016.

Amongst a great many others, he illustrated Where the Bugaboo Lives, an interactive choose your own adventure story by Sean Taylor, which won the Hampshire Illustrated Book Award and the Coventry Inspiration Book Award. It is now a Little Angel Theatre production.

Neal now lives on the Isle of Wight.

== Selected Books as Author and Illustrator ==
- The Tree: An Environmental Fable (Walker Books, 2017) ISBN 978-1-4063-7320-2
- A Planet Full of Plastic: and how you can help (Wren & Rook, 2019) ISBN 978-1-5263-6176-9
- A Climate in Chaos: and how you can help (Wren & Rook, 2020) ISBN 978-1-5263-6231-5
- A World Full of Wildlife: and how you can protect it (Wren & Rook, 2022) ISBN 978-1-5263-6321-3
- The Story of Everything (Hodder Children's Books, 2023) ISBN 978-1-5263-6261-2
- The Big Story of Being Alive (Wren & Rook, 2023) ISBN 978-1-5263-6264-3
- The Story Of Things (Hodder Children's Books, 2024) ISBN 978-1-5263-6262-9
- What is AI? by Neal Layton (Hodder Children's Books, 2024) ISBN 978-1-4449-7559-8

== Selected Books as Illustrator ==
- That Rabbit Belongs to Emily Brown written by Cressida Cowell (Orchard Books, 2006) ISBN 978-1-84362-451-6
- Poo: A Natural History of the Unmentionable written by Nicola Davies (Walker Books, 2014) ISBN 978-1-4063-5663-2
- Uncle Gobb and the Dread Shed written by Michael Rosen (Bloomsbury Children's Books, 2016) ISBN 978-1-4088-5132-6

== Awards ==
- 2002 Nestlé Smarties Book Prize (Bronze Award) Oscar and Arabella
- 2004 Nestlé Smarties Book Prize (Bronze Award) Bartholomew and the Bug
- 2004 Sheffield Children’s Book Prize (picture book winner) Jennifer Jones Won’t Leave Me Alone with Frieda Wishinsky
- 2008 Nestlé Smarties Book Prize (Gold Award) That Rabbit Belongs to Emily Brown with Cressida Cowell.
- 2014 SLA Information Book Award (winner under 7's category) The Story of Stars
- 2016 Sheffield Children’s Book Award (Overall Winner) Uncle Gobb and the Dread Shed with Michael Rosen
- 2017 Hampshire Illustrated Book Award Where the Bugaboo Lives with Sean Taylor
- 2018 Hampshire Picture Book Award (picture book winner) Danny McGee Drinks the Sea with Andy Stanton
