= Oscar and Arabella =

Book by Neal Layton

- Author: Neal Layton
- Illustrator: Neal Layton
- Language: English
- Genre: Children's
- Publisher: Hodder Children's Books
- Publication date: May 16, 2002
- Publication place: United Kingdom
- Pages: 27 pp
- ISBN: 978-0-340-79719-8
- OCLC: 53992559
- Followed by: Oscar and Arabella, Hot Hot Hot

Oscar and Arabella is a children's picture book by Neal Layton, published in 2002. It won the Nestlé Smarties Book Prize Bronze Award.

Oscar and Arabella are two woolly mammoths living in the Ice Age. They are the protagonists of the series, which also includes Oscar and Arabella, Hot Hot Hot (2004) and Oscar and Arabella and Ormsby (2007).
