= Bartholomew and the Bug =

Children's picture book by Neal Layton and winner of Smarties Prize

- Author: Neal Layton
- Illustrator: Neal Layton
- Language: English
- Genre: Children's
- Publisher: Hodder Children's Books
- Publication date: 16 September 2004
- Publication place: United Kingdom
- Pages: 32 pp
- ISBN: 978-0-340-87328-1
- OCLC: 56640562
- Dewey Decimal: [E] 22
- LC Class: PZ7.L4476 Bar 2004

Bartholomew and the Bug is a children's picture book by Neal Layton, published in 2004. It won the Nestlé Smarties Book Prize Bronze Award.

== Reception ==
A Kirkus Reviews review says: "A lighthearted take on mortality, as well as the old truth that travel is a broadening experience."

Bartholomew and The Bug is the Smarties Prize Bronze Award Winner.
