= That Rabbit Belongs to Emily Brown =

Book by Cressida Cowell

- Author: Cressida Cowell
- Illustrator: Neal Layton
- Language: English
- Genre: Children's
- Publisher: Orchard Books
- Publication date: 7 September 2006
- Publication place: United Kingdom
- Pages: 32 pp
- ISBN: 978-1-84362-451-6
- OCLC: 70402648

That Rabbit Belongs to Emily Brown is a children's picture book written by Cressida Cowell and illustrated by Neal Layton, published in 2006. It won the Nestlé Children's Book Prize Gold Award, as well as being shortlisted for the Booktrust Early Years Awards and longlisted for the Kate Greenaway Medal.

== Plot ==
Emily Brown has a floppy gray stuffed rabbit, Stanley, that she loves very much. They go on adventures every day, such as scuba diving, going to outer space, and other things like that. They have much fun together, until one day, they hear a "Rat-a-tat-tat at the kitchen door". It is the Queen's Footman, who wants to have Stanley (whom he calls Bunnywunny) for the Queen in exchange for a brand-new golden bear. Emily says no, but the Queen keeps sending more of her officers to offer her more and more toys, but since Emily keeps refusing, they steal Stanley from her in her sleep. The next morning, Emily marches up to the castle, where she finds out the Queen put him in the laundry and turned him pink, and also he has been filled with stuffing and had his mouth sewn up so he looks miserable. Emily takes the rabbit and goes home, but before that she gives the golden teddy bear to the sad Queen and tells her to do everything with that bear, to go on adventures and sleep with him at night, until he becomes real. A while later, Emily gets a letter from the Queen that says "Thank you" and has a picture of the Queen holding her smiling bear.

== Emily Brown and the Thing ==
The second book in the Emily Brown series was adapted for the stage by Tall Stories Theatre Company, premiering in 2014 and touring the UK and internationally since then.

== See also ==
- Knuffle Bunny, a similar book about a stuffed rabbit
