= Under the Tree (Ed Sheeran song) =

2024 Christmas song by Ed Sheeran

Single by Ed Sheeran
- Released: 26 November 2024
- Recorded: 2024
- Genre: Christmas music
- Length: 4:02
- Label: Gingerbread Man Records
- Songwriters: Ed Sheeran; Johnny McDaid
- Producers: Ed Sheeran; Johnny McDaid

Ed Sheeran singles chronology
"The Great British Bar Off" (2023)	"Under the Tree" (2024)	"Azizam" (2025)

Music video
- "Under the Tree" on YouTube

"Under the Tree" is a Christmas song written, produced and performed by English singer-songwriter Ed Sheeran and co-written and co-produced by Snow Patrol member Johnny McDaid for the 2024 Netflix animated film That Christmas. The song was released as a non-album digital single on 26 November 2024 by Sheeran's vanity record label Gingerbread Man Records and became available on Spotify, Apple Music and YouTube Music.

== Music video ==
The music video for "Under the Tree", titled Ed Sheeran: Under the Tree, was directed by Richard Curtis, produced by Ramshackle Productions and Dan Matthews, cinematographed by Danny Cohen and edited by Sim Evan-Jones. The music video stars Ed Sheeran as himself and Bridgerton actress Claudia Jessie as Anna and it also features some That Christmas scenes. Ed Sheeran: Under the Tree was also filmed in the Suffolk seaside town of Southwold (which is one of the three inspirations for the fictional Suffolk seaside town of Wellington-on-Sea in That Christmas) as well as being uploaded on YouTube on 27 November 2024.

== Charts ==
"Under the Tree" reached top 40 on the charts in Italy, Belgium and Germany.

Chart (2024–2025)	Peak position
Austria (Ö3 Austria Top 40)	44
Belgium (Ultratop 50 Flanders)	37
Canada Hot 100 (Billboard)	85
Germany (GfK)	40
Global 200 (Billboard)	129
Ireland (IRMA)	73
Italy (FIMI)	21
Netherlands (Single Top 100)	55
New Zealand Hot Singles (RMNZ)	11
Slovakia Airplay (ČNS IFPI)	32
Sweden (Sverigetopplistan)	44
Switzerland (Schweizer Hitparade)	67
UK Singles (OCC)	55
UK Indie (OCC)	8
US Holiday Digital Song Sales (Billboard)	11
