= Cressida Cowell =

British writer

The Honourable Cressida Cowell MBE FRSL
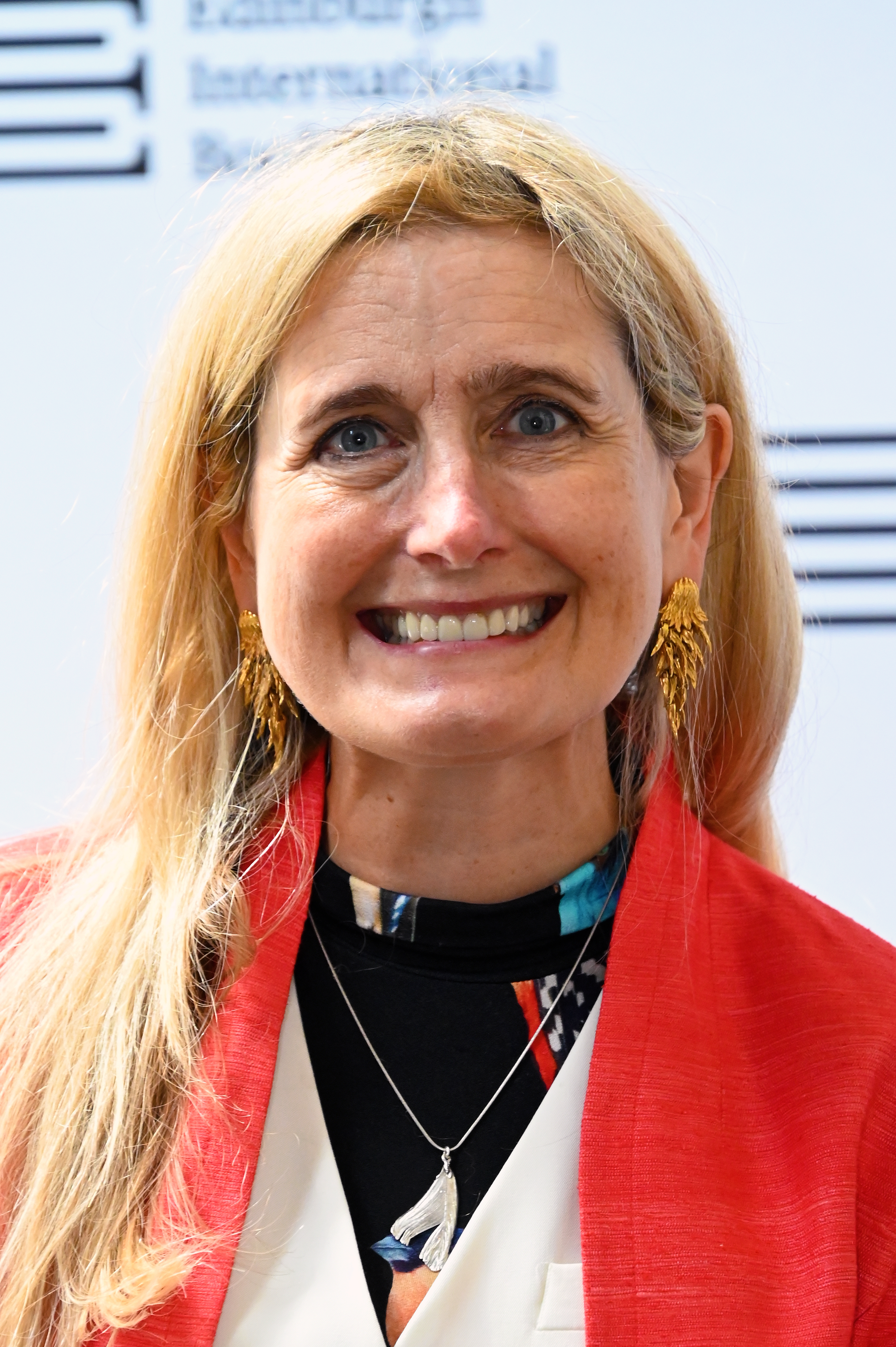
- Cowell in 2025
- Born: 15 April 1966 (age 60); London, England
- Education: University of Oxford
- Occupation: Writer
- Spouse: Simon Cowell
- Children: 3
- Parent(s): Michael Hare, 2nd Viscount Blakenham; Marcia Persephone Hare
- Writing career
- Notable work: How to Train Your Dragon series
- Website: www.cressidacowell.co.uk

Cressida Cowell (née Hare, born 15 April 1966) is a British author. She is best known for the book series How to Train Your Dragon, which has subsequently become a media franchise as adapted by DreamWorks Animation. As of 2015, the series has sold more than seven million copies around the world.

In addition to her other publications, Cowell works with illustrator Neal Layton in the ongoing series of Emily Brown stories. The first in the series, That Rabbit Belongs to Emily Brown, won a Nestlé Children’s Book Award.

== Personal life ==
The Hon. Cressida Cowell was born on 15 April 1966 in London. She is the daughter of Michael Hare, 2nd Viscount Blakenham. Her uncle, by marriage, is former U.S. Supreme Court justice Stephen Breyer.

As a child, Cowell states she "grew up in London and on a small, uninhabited island off the west coast of Scotland," and that it was during summers spent on the Inner Hebrides, where she first began to develop her writing and drawing skills:

"I spent a great deal of time as a child on a tiny, uninhabited island off the west coast of Scotland...By the time I was eight, my family had built a small stone house on the island, and with the boat, we could nearly fish for enough food to feed the family for the whole summer."
"From then on, every year we spent four weeks of the summer and two weeks of the spring on the island. The house was lit by candle-light, and there was no telephone or television, so I spent a lot of time drawing and writing stories."

Cowell attended Keble College, Oxford where she studied English, and she also attended Saint Martin's School of Art and Brighton University where she learned illustration. She studied at Marlborough College (1982–84).

Cressida Cowell presently lives in London with her husband Simon, a former director and interim CEO of the International Save the Children Alliance; daughters Maisie and Clementine; and son Alexander.

== List of works ==
=== How to Train Your Dragon books ===
- How to Train Your Dragon (2003)
- How to Be a Pirate (2004)
- How to Speak Dragonese (2005)
- How to Cheat a Dragon's Curse (2006)
- How to Twist a Dragon's Tale (2007)
- A Hero's Guide to Deadly Dragons (2008)
- How to Ride a Dragon's Storm (2008)
- How to Break a Dragon's Heart (2009)
- How to Steal a Dragon's Sword (2011)
- How to Seize a Dragon's Jewel (2012)
- How to Betray a Dragon's Hero (2013)
- How to Fight a Dragon's Fury (2015)

=== Emily Brown books ===
- That Rabbit Belongs to Emily Brown (2007)
- Emily Brown and the Thing (2007)
- Emily Brown and the Elephant Emergency (2010)
- Cheer Up Your Teddy Bear, Emily Brown! (2011)
- Emily Brown and Father Christmas (2018)

=== The Wizards books ===
- The Wizards of Once (2018)
- The Wizards of Once: Twice Magic (2019)
- The Wizards of Once: Knock Three Times (2020)
- The Wizards of Once: Never and Forever (2020)

=== The Treetop Twins Adventures books ===
- The Twins Take on T. Rex (2019)
- The Twins Discover a Diplodocus (2019)
- The Twins Meet a Massospondylus (2019)
- The Twins Climb a Camarasaurus (2019)
- The Twins Play with a Plesiosaur (2019)
- The Twins Help a Hadrosaur (2019)
- The Twins Have a Picnic with a Spinosaurus (2019)
- The Twins Track Down a Triceratops (2019)
- The Twins Meet a Mystery Dinosaur (2019)
- The Twins Save a Stegosaurus (2019)
- The Twins Meet a Hatzegopteryx (2019)
- The Twins Meet Two Tyrannosaurs (2019)

=== The Treetop Twins: Wilderness Adventures books ===
- The Twins Follow a Polar Bear (2020)
- The Twins Meet a Quagga (2020)
- The Twins Help a Pink Dolphin (2020)
- The Twins Discover a Dodo (2020)
- The Twins Walk With a Woolly Mammoth (2020)
- The Twins Track a Tiger (2021)
- The Twins Meet a Monkey (2021)
- The Twins Greet a Great Auk (2021)
- The Twins Pursue a Penguin (2021)
- The Twins Run After a Rhino (2021)
- The Twins Watch a Whale (2021)
- The Twins Seek a Saola (2021)

=== The Tiny Detectives books ===
- Can Trees Talk? (2021)
- Do Fish Glow in the Dark? (2021)
- Do Spiders Have Pets? (2021)
- Do Koalas Have Fingerprints? (2021)
- Why Do Stars Twinkle? (2021)
- Can Animals Walk on Water? (2021)
- Is the Middle of the Earth Hot? (2021)
- Why is the Sky Blue? (2021)
- Can Wolves See in the Dark? (2022)
- Can it Snow in the Desert? (2022)
- Is There Life at the Bottom of the Deepest Ocean? (2022)
- Can Butterflies Taste With Their Feet? (2022)

=== Other books ===
- Little Wonder (1998)
- Little Bo Peep's Library Book (1999)
- Don’t Do That, Kitty Kilroy (1999)
- What Shall We Do with the Boo-Hoo Baby (2001)
- Hiccup the Viking Who Was Seasick (2001)
- One Too Many Tigers (2001)
- Claydon Was a Clingy Child (2002)
- Super Sue (2003)
- Daddy on the Moon (2005)
- Super Sue at Super School (2005)
- There's No Such Thing as a Ghostie (2005)
- Little Bo Peep’s Troublesome Sheep (2009)
- The Story of Tantrum O'Furrily (2018)
- Which Way to Anywhere (2022)
- Which Way Round the Galaxy (2023)

== Awards ==
- 2006 Nestlé Children’s Book Prize, Gold Award, 0–5 years category: That Rabbit Belongs to Emily Brown by Cressida Cowell & Neal Layton (Orchard Books)
- 2018 Blue Peter Book Award, Best Story category: The Wizards of Once (Hodder Children's Books)
- 2019 Children’s Laureate

Cowell was appointed Member of the Order of the British Empire (MBE) in the 2020 Birthday Honours for services to children's literature.

In 2021, she was elected a Fellow of the Royal Society of Literature (FRSL).

Cultural offices
Preceded by Lauren Child	Children's Laureate of the United Kingdom; 2019–2022	Succeeded by Joseph Coelho
