= The New Simpsons Movie =

Upcoming animated film

- Teaser poster
- Directed by: Rob Oliver
- Based on: The Simpsons by Matt Groening
- Music by: John Debney
- Production companies: 20th Century Studios; Gracie Films
- Distributed by: 20th Century Studios
- Release date: September 3, 2027
- Country: United States
- Language: English

The New Simpsons Movie is an upcoming American animated comedy film based on the Fox animated sitcom The Simpsons created by Matt Groening. Directed by Rob Oliver in his feature-length directorial debut and produced by 20th Century Studios and Gracie Films, it is the second feature film adaptation of the series and the sequel to The Simpsons Movie (2007).

Following the release of the original Simpsons film in 2007, several ideas for a sequel were brainstormed but development never got off the ground. In September 2025, Disney, which acquired 21st Century Fox in 2019, officially announced the sequel, with the working title of The Simpsons 2. The official title was announced at D23 in August 2026 when Oliver was announced as the director.

The New Simpsons Movie is scheduled to be released in the United States on September 3, 2027, by 20th Century Studios.

== Production ==
=== Development ===
In June 2014, James L. Brooks stated that 20th Century Fox had approached him and requested a second film based on The Simpsons. He added that there were no immediate plans, stating, "We've been asked to [develop it], but we haven't. We're doing a lot of other stuff". In December 2014, just prior to the broadcast of the season twenty-sixth episode "The Man Who Came to Be Dinner", series writer Al Jean wrote on Twitter that the episode (which had been produced in 2012 and was originally set to air in 2013) had been held back by himself and Brooks because it was being considered for adaptation into a sequel film as the episode was "cinematic". Jean later expanded that there was the fear of the potential film being considered "not canonical" with the TV series and the potential backlash of overcoming it by using a "memory wipe".

In July 2017, during the 10th anniversary of The Simpsons Movie, Jean and David Silverman said that a sequel film was in the early stages of development and stressed the toll production of the first picture took on the entire staff. On August 10, 2018, it was reported that a sequel was in development. On July 22, 2019, series creator Matt Groening stated that he had "no doubts" that The Walt Disney Company, which acquired 21st Century Fox early that year, would likely produce a sequel one day. In July 2021, Jean stated that discussions for the potential sequel had stalled due to the COVID-19 pandemic. In May 2024, Jean expressed his hopes for a sequel: "I want to see the animation business completely returned to what it was before the pandemic. And then, I think if that was the case, it would make sense to do The Simpsons theatrically".

In September 2025, Disney announced the sequel, with the working title of The Simpsons 2. In August 2026, at D23: The Ultimate Disney Fan Event, the official title was confirmed as The New Simpsons Movie. An animatic of a scene from the film in which Homer attempts to catch a ball at a baseball game was screened at the same event. Rob Oliver was announced as the director.

== Release ==
The New Simpsons Movie is scheduled to be released in the United States on September 3, 2027. It was previously scheduled for July 23, 2027, taking over a date that Disney had originally reserved for an untitled Marvel Studios film.
