= Married Single Other =

- Intertitle
- Genre: Comedy-drama
- Written by: Peter Souter
- Directed by: Declan Lowney; Charles Martin
- Starring: Amanda Abbington; Lucy Davis; Shaun Dooley; Dean Lennox Kelly; Ralf Little; Miranda Raison
- Country of origin: United Kingdom
- Original language: English
- No. of episodes: 6

Production
- Executive producers: Andy Harries; Hugo Heppell
- Producer: Radford Neville
- Running time: 49 minutes (inc. adverts)
- Production company: Left Bank Pictures

Original release
- Network: ITV
- Release: 22 February – 29 March 2010

Married Single Other is a British six-episode comedy-drama television miniseries created and written by Peter Souter. The series is based on the lives of group of people who are either married, single or "other", other being defined as in a relationship. It began airing on Monday 22 February 2010 on ITV (except STV in central and northern Scotland). The drama series was later screened on STV from February 2012. The series was filmed on location in various areas of Leeds, while Left Bank Pictures television studios annexed to The Leeds Studios were used for interior shooting.

== Premise ==
The series revolves around three lower middle class couples living in suburban Leeds. Two of the couples have adolescent children, although there is less focus on them than on their parents. While all three couples appear throughout, episodes generally centre mostly on one of the couples. The series has been compared to an earlier ITV comedy drama, Cold Feet (1997–2003).

== Characters ==
The Promotional Ad and Cast

=== Main characters ===
Dickie and Babs
"Married". Dickie (Dean Lennox Kelly), who is self-employed and making income from his ideas, is married to unemployed child psychologist Babs (Amanda Abbington). Babs is unhappy in her marriage. She has one child from her ex, who left her for another woman and whom she now refers to as "the sperm donor". Clint and Dickie are brothers.
Clint and Abbey
"Single". Clint (Ralf Little) has never slept with the same girl twice, until he meets model Abbey (Miranda Raison). He falls in love with Abbey, who as yet doesn't feel the same. Clint and Abbey are of the three the upwardly mobile couple.
Lillie and Eddie
"Other". Lillie (Lucy Davis), a domestic violence charity worker, has been in a long-term relationship with paramedic Eddie (Shaun Dooley). Eddie has asked for 15 years on Lillie's birthday to get married but she has not yet accepted. In the first episode, he asks her and she once again declines. They have two sons, Harry and Joe.

=== Supporting characters ===
Harry
Harry (Tom Kane) is the eldest son of Eddie and Lillie and is aged 16. He is a somewhat awkward character who is smitten by Gina.
Joe
Joe (Jack Scanlon) is the younger son of Eddie and Lillie and is aged 11. He is extremely clever and often displays his knowledge of various subjects, leading him to be bullied at school. Joe also displays some autistic tendencies such as an obsession with numbers, particularly pi.
Gina
Gina (Leila Mimmack) is the daughter of Babs and is aged 15. Unlike Harry, Gina is confident and although she is friends with Harry, she sees herself as a 'cut above' and does not return his romantic interest. The identity of Gina's father is never truly revealed.
Flo
Flo (Gina Yashere) is a colleague of Eddie's who is constantly frustrated by false emergency calls. She acts as a source of advice for Eddie, however is often irritated by his worrying about his "white middle-class" personal problems.
Mr Connolly
After breaching the terms of his restraining order and attempting to meet his wife at the women's refuge, Mr Connolly (Neil Bell) is confronted by Lillie. After attacking Lillie, Mr Connolly feigns injury and attempts to have her sacked for assaulting him.
Eros
Eros (Edward Franklin) is a 17-year-old petty criminal whom Gina goes to great lengths to defend. After he is caught trying to steal presents from Eddie and Lillie's wedding, Gina relents and has no further contact with him.
Fabiana
Fabiana (Oona Chaplin) is a Brazilian cage dancer whom Clint seduces before changing his mind and rejecting her. In a vengeful act, Fabiana works her way into the circle of friends and seduces Clint's brother, Dickie and moves into his caravan. After Abbey finds out she leaves Clint.

== Production ==
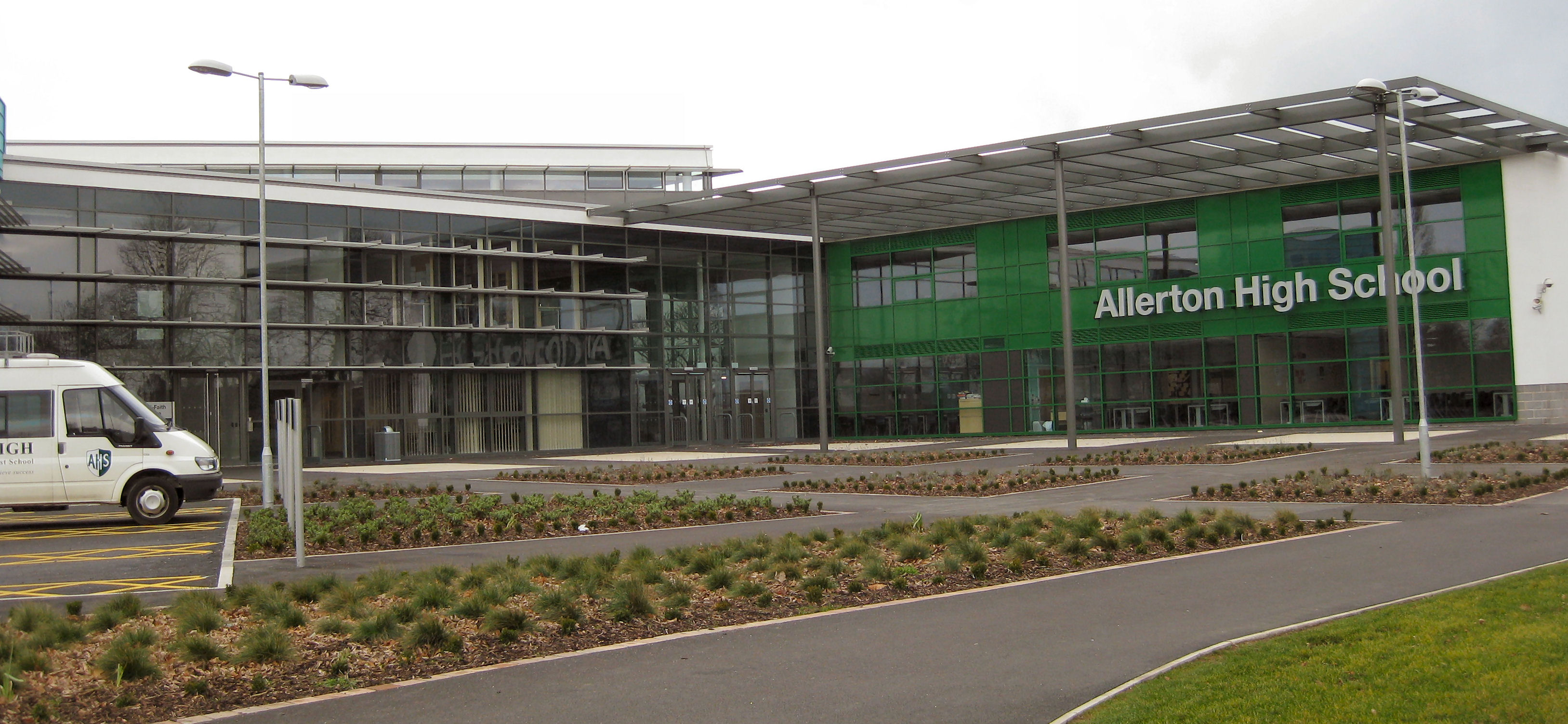
Allerton High School is used throughout the series

The series has been filmed around several areas of Leeds, generally breaking away from using traditional Yorkshire Television locations such as Chapel Allerton, Kirkstall and Yeadon, instead using areas such as Little London, Lincoln Green, Sherburn-in-Elmet and Burmantofts. Extensive parts of the city centre are used, in particular Clarence Dock. Clint is seen climbing to Abbey's flat which is located above the river terrace of Aire Bar on Call Lane. Allerton High School in Alwoodley is used throughout the series. Eddie and Lillie were shown to get married at Leeds Civic Hall and then had the wedding reception in a marquee on Blenheim Square, Little London. Their house and Clint's flat are in Hanover Square, Burley. Shots of Leeds are used in between scenes.

The theme tune to this programme is "Find My Way Back Home" by Priscilla Ahn. The programme also relies on leitmotifs through the episodes, using music by bands such as The Cure, Radiohead and Goldfrapp. Babs performs The Housemartins' Caravan of Love at Eddie and Lillie's wedding.

In May 2010 ITV announced the series' cancellation. Executive producer Andy Harries told The Guardian "We had an amazing cast, a devoted following and some strong ideas for series two. It's a horrible feeling to be dumped, we thought there was still life in the relationship, but we're definitely 'other' now." He told the 2010 Edinburgh International Television Festival, "It averaged 4.65 million across the series, the best for an ITV drama to be decommissioned in the last four years [...] The audience didn't stay. I suppose the stories weren't strong enough. There were some weaker episodes. It found its strength towards the end, I think a second series would have found its feet and grown its audience. ITV disagreed."

== Episodes ==
No.	Title	Directed by	Written by	Original release date
1	"I Don't"	Declan Lowney	Peter Souter	22 February 2010
Parents Lillie (Lucy Davis) and Eddie (Shaun Dooley) clash over marriage, Babs (Amanda Abbington) has had enough of husband Dickie's (Dean Lennox Kelly) gambling, and womaniser Clint (Ralf Little) is intrigued by model Abbey (Miranda Raison)
2	"Dinner For Six"	Declan Lowney	Peter Souter	1 March 2010
Babs craves financial security and Dickie has stacked up thousands in debt. Clint has not heard from Abbey and it is driving him crazy. Lillie is suspended from work. Clint organises a dinner party to prove to Abbey he is a settled man, meanwhile Gina accidentally sends a text to Harry insinuating she wants sex, leading him to the wrong conclusions.
3	"Burning Rubber"	Declan Lowney	Peter Souter	8 March 2010
At the tribunal Lillie thinks her career is over - until Babs finds the evidence she needs to clear her name. Gina enlists Harry's help to stop Joe being bullied. In attending to an emergency call, Eddie learns something which could be life changing.
4	"Chink"	Charles Martin	Peter Souter	15 March 2010
Abbey breaks up with Clint after she suspects him of infidelity, Dickie meets a woman while out shopping with Gina and Lillie is diagnosed with a terminal brain tumour.
5	"T.D.D.U.P."	Charles Martin	Peter Souter	22 March 2010
Lillie and Eddie marry, meanwhile Lillie starts to prepare for dying. Harry and Gina become closer after Eros shows his true colours. The episode ends on a cliffhanger with Lillie being rushed to hospital, it is however unclear whether she dies.
6	"Catnip"	Charles Martin	Peter Souter	29 March 2010
Fabiana turns up at Lillie's funeral and seduces Dickie, when Abbey finds out she's on the scene she leaves Clint. Meanwhile Babs and Gina move in with Eddie, Harry and Joe and the five of them get used to living together.

== Reception ==
Married Single Other generally received positive reviews. The series has on occasions been compared to Cold Feet, given the similarly aged cast, Northern middle-class setting and similar themes. The series has the same director and producer as Cold Feet, Declan Lowney and Andy Harries respectively. Tim Dowling from The Guardian wrote "Yes, it's predictable. Yes, it's a lot like Cold Feet. And Married Single Other is also a pleasure to watch". Dowling drew similarities from the series compared with Cold Feet such as the "a northern location, a large cast of inter-connected characters, implausibly wry dialogue, dangerous levels of sentimentality, some well-signposted cliches and Ralf Little."

On the Box also likened it to Cold Feet, claiming "ITV must be furiously trying to work out how to replicate the success of Cold Feet, the influential comedy drama about the turbulent relationships of a handful of 30-somethings".

Stephen Armstrong from The Times called the programme "a strangely rare television gem - a genuinely good romcom with no bonnets in it."

The Leicester Mercury gave a more negative review stating "Married Single Other (ITV, 9pm) teetered precariously on the brink of schmaltz for nearly an hour, before finally giving up and plunging headlong into lines which even Richard Curtis would think were OTT."

Brian Viner in The Independent thought it 'lacks almost all of Cold Feet's many virtue... it's more of a wilting carnation than a golden rose.' And noted that 'you can be fairly sure that the writer has spent too long studying the life and works of Richard Curtis – either that or browsing in Clinton Cards'

Unreality Primetime said of the series "It's not that it’s not good; it’s just not Cold Feet good – yet – so I think ITV shot itself in the foot by offering up that comparison."

The series has been nominated in the Best Drama/Entertainment category at the 2010 Royal Television Society Yorkshire Awards.

=== International ===
In Australia, Network Ten is scheduled to air the series on 22 August 2010.

In South Africa, BBC Entertainment showed the series in August 2010.

In Belgium, één is scheduled to air the series on 31 August 2010.

In Estonia, Eesti Televisioon started showing the series on 30 November 2010.

In Israel, Hot3 started showing the series in April 2011.

In Portugal, the show premiered in May 2010 on FOX Next. FOX Life and Fox Life HD started broadcasting the show on 7 March 2011.

In Sweden, the show premiered in May 2011 on Sveriges Television.

In Poland, the show premiered in May 2013 on Telewizja Polska TVP2.

In Finland, the show was aired in January 2013 on YLE2.

In Europe, Africa and Asia, the show started airing on BBC Entertainment in December 2011.

== DVD release ==
Married Single Other was released on DVD and Blu-ray by 2 Entertain on 5 April 2010.
