= Nicola Davies (author) =

Welsh author and zoologist

- Born: May 3, 1958 (age 68); Birmingham, England
- Occupations: Zoologist, writer
- Website: nicola-davies.com

Nicola Davies (born 3 May 1958), earlier known as Nick Davies, is a Welsh zoologist and writer and is the Children's Laureate for Wales 2025–2027. She is the author of more than 80 books for children and young people, picture books, non fiction poetry and fiction. Her work focuses mainly on biological science, nature and human relationships with the natural world but she has also written about refugees, war, grief and disability. Her work has been published in multiple languages around the world and adapted for the stage and animation. She was one of the original presenters of the BBC children's wildlife programme The Really Wild Show. Her books include Home, which was shortlisted for the Branford Boase Award, and Poo (2004), which was illustrated by Neal Layton, and was shortlisted for a Blue Peter Book Award in 2006; in the United States, the book is published as Poop: A Natural History of the Unmentionable. Her children's picture book The Promise illustrated by Laura Carlin won the Green Book Award in 2015 and was cited as one of the New York Times picture books of the year. It was made into an animated short film for the BBC TINY illustrated by Emily Sutton won the Subaru AAAS prize for best science book in its age category. https://www.sbfprize.org/tiny-creatures The YA eco fantasy ‘Skrimsli’ won the children and young people's category of Wales Book of the Year in 2024 https://fireflypress.co.uk/blog/tiger-sea-captain-skrimsli-wins-wales-book-of-the-year-in-a-night-to-remember/ Choose Love a poetry collection highlighting the refugee experience was shortlisted for the YOTO Carniege Medal for writing in 2024 https://carnegies.co.uk/wp-content/uploads/2023/02/Choose_Love_Shortlist_Pack1.pdf

Gaia Warriors (2009), written in association with James Lovelock, explains the science of climate change and answers commonly-asked questions.

Davies is married to Daniel Jones: she has two children from her first marriage.

In October 2026, Davies announced that she would donate future royalties from her book The Day the War Came to Irish author Sally Rooney, whose books had been withdrawn from sale in the UK due to her support for Palestine Action.

== Works ==
- Big Blue Whale (1997) illustrated by Nick Maland ISBN 978-0744578966
- Bat Loves the Night (2001) illustrated by Sarah Fox Davies ISBN 978-0744578966
- One Tiny Turtle (2001) illustrated by Jane Chapman ISBN 978-1406364637
- Wild About Dolphins (2001) ISBN 978-0744562668
- Surprising Sharks (2003) illustrated by James Croft ISBN 978-1406366976
- Birds (2003) ISBN 978-0753456170
- Poo: A Natural History of the Unmentionable (2004) illustrated by Neal Layton ISBN 978-1406356632
- Oceans and Seas (2004) ASIN B01K3ORMJ4
- Home (2005) ASIN B0168SSVKI
- Ice Bear (2005) illustrated by Gary Blythe ISBN 978-1406364644
- Extreme Animals: The Toughest Creatures (2006) illustrated by Neil Layton ISBN 978-1439593943
- What's Eating you? Parasites: The Inside Story (2007) illustrated by Neil Layton ISBN 978-1406356649
- White Owl, Barn Owl (2007) illustrated by Michael Foreman ISBN 978-1406365443
- Up on the Hill (2008) with design by Terry Milne ISBN 978-1406309157
- Gaia Warriors (2009) by James Lovelock and Nicola Davies ISBN 978-1406312348
- Just the Right Size: Why Big Animals Are Big and Little Animals Are Little (2009) illustrated by Neil Layton - awarded 2021 Mathical Honors ISBN 978-1406323399
- Grow Your Own Monsters (2010) by Nicola Davies and Simon Hickmott ISBN 978-1845078331
- Everything You Need to Know About Animals (2010) ISBN 978-0753436516
- A Girl Called Dog (2011) ISBN 978-0552563017
- Monsters of the Deep (2011) ISBN 978-1847327369
- Talk, Talk, Squawk!: How and Why Animals Communicate (2011) illustrated by Neil Layton ISBN 978-1406321180
- Welcome to Silver Street Farm (2011) illustrated by Katharine McEwen ISBN 978-1406320596
- Escape from Silver Street Farm (2011) illustrated by Katharine McEwen ISBN 978-1406323047
- Spring Fever at Silver Street Farm (2011) illustrated by Katharine McEwen ISBN 978-1406323061
- All Aboard at Silver Street Farm (2011) illustrated by Katharine McEwen ISBN 978-1406323054
- A First Book of Nature (2012) illustrated by Mark Herald (published as Outside Your Window in the US) - winner of the Independent Booksellers Best Picture Book ISBN 978-1406349160
- Deadly!: The Truth About the Most Dangerous Creatures on Earth (2012) illustrated by Neal Layton ISBN 978-1406357424
- Dolphin Baby (2012) illustrated by Brita Granstrom ISBN 978-1406321197
- Frozen Solid at Silver Street Farm (2012) illustrated by Katharine McEwen ISBN 978-1406337839
- Just Ducks! (2012) illustrated by Salvatore Rubbino - shortlisted for the Kate Greenaway Medal 2013 ISBN 978-1406367034
- Rubbish Town Hero (2012) ISBN 978-0552563024
- What Will I Be? (2012) illustrated by Marc Boutavant ISBN 978-0763658038
- Who's Like Me? (2012) illustrated by Marc Boutavant ISBN 978-1406328127
- Deserts (2012) ISBN 978-0753468364
- What Happens Next? (2012) illustrated by Marc Boutavant ISBN 978-0763662646
- Crowded Out at Silver Street Farm (2012) illustrated by Katharine McEwen ISBN 978-1406337822
- Manatee Baby (2013) ISBN 978-1406340884
- The Elephant Road (2013) illustrated by Annabel Wright ISBN 978-1406340877
- The Lion Who Stole My Arm (2013) Winner of The Portsmouth Book Award 2014 ISBN 978-0763666200
- The Promise (2013) illustrated by Laura Carlin - winner of the 2014 English Association Picture Book award for best fiction ISBN 978-1406355598
- Walking the Bear (2013) ISBN 978-1406340891
- Whale Boy (2013) - shortlisted for the "Best Story" category of the 2014 Blue Peter Book Awards ISBN 978-0440870159
- Tiny Creatures: The World of Microbes (2014) illustrated by Emily Sutton ISBN 978-0763673154
- The Leopard's Tail (2015) illustrated by Annabel Wright ISBN 978-1406356007
- The Whale Who Saved Us (2015) illustrated by Annabel Wright ISBN 978-1406356106
- I (Don't) Like Snakes (2015) illustrated by Luciano Lozano ISBN 978-1406365689
- A First Book of Animals (2016) illustrated by Petr Horácek ISBN 978-1406378122
- Survivors: The Toughest Creatures on Earth (2016) illustrated by Neal Layton ISBN 978-1406356656
- Animal Surprises (2016) illustrated by Abbie Cameron ISBN 978-1910862445
- Into the Blue (2016) illustrated by Abbie Cameron ISBN 978-1910862452
- The Word Bird (2016) illustrated by Abbie Cameron ISBN 978-1910862438
- The White Hare (2016) illustrated by Anastasia Izlesou ISBN 978-1910862483
- Mother Cary's Butter Knife (2016) illustrated by Anja Uhren ISBN 978-1910862476
- Perfect (2016) illustrated by Cathy Fisher ISBN 978-1910862469
- Lots: The Diversity of Life on Earth (2017) illustrated by Emily Sutton ISBN 978-1406360486
- Animals Behaving Badly (2017) illustrated by Adam Stower ISBN 978-1406366051
- Dolphin Baby (2017) illustrated by Brita Granstrom ISBN 978-1406321197
- The Variety of Life (2017) illustrated by Lorna Scobie ISBN 978-1444931198
- King of the Sky (2017) illustrated by Laura Carlin - shortlisted for the Tir na n-Og Award ISBN 978-1444931198
- The Pond (2017) illustrated by Cathy Fisher ISBN 978-1912050703
- Elias Martin (2017) illustrated by Fran Shum ISBN 978-1910862506
- A First Book of the Sea (July 2018) illustrated by Emily Sutton ISBN 978-1406368956
- The Day the War Came (2018) illustrated by Rebecca Cobb - shortlisted for The Kate Greenaway Medal ISBN 978-1406376326
- The Little Mistake (2018) illustrated by Cathy Fisher ISBN 978-1912654086
- Flying Free (2018) illustrated by Cathy Fisher ISBN 978-1912654093
- Ariki and the Giant Shark (2018) illustrated by Nicola Kinnear ISBN 978-1406369793
- The Secret of the Egg (2018) illustrations by Abbie Cameron ISBN 978-1912213672
- The Eel Question (2018) illustrated by Beth Holland ISBN 978-1910862520
- Bee Boy and the Moonflowers (2018) illustrated by Max Low ISBN 978-1910862513
- Brave and the Fox (2018) illustrated by Sebastien Braun ISBN 978-1407157429
- The Dog That Saved Christmas (2018) illustrated by Mike Byrne ISBN 978-1781127698
- The Mountain Lamb (2019) illustrated by Cathy Fisher ISBN 978-1912654109
- A Boy's Best Friend (2019) illustrated by Cathy Fisher ISBN 978-1912654116
- Ariki and the Island of Wonders (2019) illustrated by Nicola Kinnear ISBN 978-1406369809
- Hummingbird (2019) illustrated by Jane Ray ISBN 978-1406379273
- Every Child a Song: A Celebration of Children's Rights (2019) illustrated by Marc Martin ISBN 978-1623718725
- The Wonder of Trees (2019) illustrated by Lorna Scobie ISBN 978-1444938197
- Butterflies for Grandpa Joe (2019) illustrated by Mike Byrne - shortlisted for the Wales Book of the Year 2020 ISBN 978-1781128824
- My Butterfly Bouquet (2020) illustrated by Hannah Peck ISBN 978-1526361295
- Grow: Secrets of Our DNA (2020) illustrated by Emily Sutton ISBN 978-1406382778
- Ride the Wind (2020) illustrated by Salvatore Rubbino ISBN 978-1406394580
- Pretend Cows (2020) illustrated by Cathy Fisher ISBN 978-1912654123
- Last (2020) written and illustrated by Nicola Davies ISBN 978-1910328484
- The New Girl (2020) illustrated by Cathy Fisher ISBN 978-1913733605
- This is How the Change Begins (2021) ISBN 978-1913634247
- The Song That Sings Us (2021) - nominated for the Carnegie Prize 2022 ISBN 978-1913102777
- One World: 24 Hours on Planet Earth (2021) illustrated by Jenni Desmond - shortlisted for the Wainwright Prize 2022 ISBN 978-1529513325
- Protecting the Planet: The Season of Giraffes (2022) illustrated by Emily Sutton ISBN 978-1406397093
- Invertebrates are Cool! (2022) illustrated by Abbie Cameron ISBN 978-1912213696
- The Magic of Flight (2022) illustrated by Lorna Scobie ISBN 978-1444948424
- Choose Love (2022) illustrated by Petr Horácek - Highly Commended in the CLiPPA Poetry Awards 2023 ISBN 978-1802583779
- Protecting the Planet: Emperor of the Ice (2023) illustrated by Catherine Rayner ISBN 978-1406397086
- The Versatile Reptile (2023) illustrated by Abbie Cameron ISBN 978-1912213689
- The Star Whale (2023) illustrated by Petr Horácek ISBN 978-1915659095
- Out There in the Wild: Poems on Nature (2023) poems by Nicola Davies, James Carter and Dom Conlon, illustrated by Diana Catchpole ISBN 978-1035004065
- Skrimsli (2023) illustrated by Jackie Morris ISBN 978-1913102807 Winner of the children's category of Wales Book of the Year 2024https://www.literaturewales.org/our-projects/wales-book-year/wales-book-of-the-year-awards-2024-the-english-language-winners/

Whale Song illustrated by Britta Teckentrup published by Walker Books 2026 One Ocean Illustrated by Jenni Desmond published by Walker Books 2026
