= Peter Souter =

British writer (born 1962)

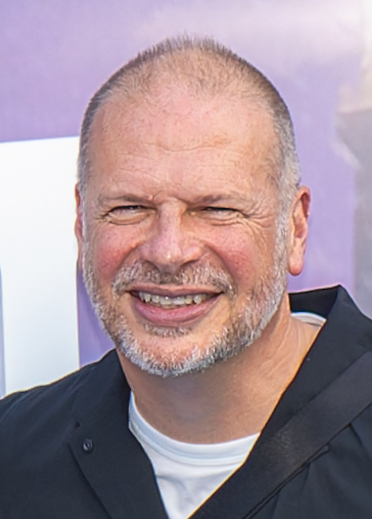
- Souter at the 2024 BFI London Film Festival premiere of That Christmas
- Born: 1962 (age 63–64)
- Occupation: Writer; TBWA London chairman and chief creative officer Former Abbott Mead Vickers BBDO executive creative director
- Years active: 2005-present

Peter Souter (born 1962) is a British writer. He is the chairman and chief creative officer of TBWA London as well as the former executive creative director of Abbott Mead Vickers BBDO. He wrote the screenplay for the 2010 ITV six-episode comedy-drama television miniseries Married Single Other and also co-wrote the screenplay for the 2024 Netflix and Locksmith Animation film That Christmas.

== Advertising career ==
Souter began his career in advertising as a copywriter at Abbott Mead Vickers BBDO in 1991, where he worked alongside Paul Brazier for 4 years. He then moved on to become deputy creative director in 1995, then executive creative director in 1997, taking over for David Abbott. In 2005 he worked on the 'Make Poverty History' campaign, which he said was the work of which he is most proud.

== Writing career ==
Souter has written plays for radio, theatre and television. His radio plays for BBC Radio 4 include Puddle, Goldfish Girl, Stream River Sea, That's Mine, This is Yours, What Love Sounds like, and "13a, 13b".

Souter's television drama, Married Single Other, is a series based on the lives of group of people who are either married, single or "other", other being defined as in a relationship. It was aired on ITV in February 2010.

For theatre, Souter wrote the play Hello/Goodbye, which was sold out at the Hampstead Theatre in its first run in 2013, and is playing again from 21 January to 28 February 2015.
