= The Truth About Poop =

Book about poop

- Front cover, designed by Elwood H. Smith
- Author: Susan E. Goodman
- Illustrator: Elwood H. Smith
- Cover artist: Elwood H. Smith
- Publisher: Viking Children's
- Publication date: May 11, 2004
- Pages: 40
- ISBN: 978-0-670-03674-5
- OCLC: 53276264
- Dewey Decimal: 612.3/6 22
- LC Class: QP159 .G665 2004

The Truth About Poop is a book by Susan E. Goodman and illustrated by Elwood H. Smith, published by Viking Children's Books.

== Book information ==
The book has chapters about the nature of excrement, its production, varieties, uses in love, war, sports, the development of flushing toilets, toilet paper, and urban waste reclamation.

== Reception ==
A Kirkus Reviews review says, "A steaming pile of fun, redolent of wide-ranging research but most suited to recreational dipping, and a fine lead-in to Masoff's monumental Oh, Yuck/The Encyclopedia of Everything Nasty, illustrated by Terry Sirrell (2000)". A Publishers Weekly review says, "While Goodman delivers the straight stuff about international and U.S. bathroom practices, demonstrating that scrupulous research can be fun, Smith (Raise the Roof!) creates vaudevillean cartoons that suggest their steamy subject but don't get too close. This scatological documentary could make a splash". Rachel G. Payne, of School Library Journal, reviewed the book saying, " Even though the cover illustration of an elephant on a chamber pot may make browsers think it is a potty-training book, the rest of Smith's retro cartoons in muted colors provide humor without being too gross".

== See also ==
- Flush!: The Scoop on Poop throughout the Ages (book)
