= Bat Loves the Night =

Book by Nicola Davies

- Front cover
- Author: Nicola Davies
- Illustrator: Sarah Fox-Davies
- Cover artist: Davies
- Language: English
- Series: Read and Wonder
- Genre: Children's literature
- Publisher: Candlewick Press
- Publication place: United States
- Media type: Print

Bat Loves the Night is a non-fiction children's picture book written by Nicola Davies, illustrated by Sarah Fox-Davies, and published August 19, 2004 by Candlewick Press.

== Summary ==
The Bat Loves the Night tells the story about a bat, and has information about bats with illustrations that show them flying, hanging, and walking. The book also talks about the different kinds of bats in the world.

== Reception ==
Bat Loves the Night received positive reviews from Kirkus Reviews, Booklist, School Library Journal, The New York Times Book Review, and Publishers Weekly.
