= Lara Breay =

English feature film producer and development executive

- Born: United Kingdom
- Education: University of Cambridge
- Occupations: Feature film producer Development executive
- Years active: 2007–present (feature films)
- Known for: Vice-president of Red Hour Films

Lara Breay is a British-Polish feature film producer and development executive who collaborates with DreamWorks Animation and Locksmith Animation. She was previously known for serving as the vice-president of Red Hour Films. After graduating University of Cambridge, she began her career as a director, writer, and producer for documentaries at the BBC. Her feature film credits include Blades of Glory (2007), The Ruins (2008), Tropic Thunder (2008), Megamind (2010), Penguins of Madagascar (2014), Ron's Gone Wrong (2021) and That Christmas (2024).

== Filmography ==
- Blades of Glory (2007) (associate producer)
- The Ruins (2008) (development executive)
- Tropic Thunder (2008) (development executive) (uncredited)
- Megamind (2010) (producer)
- Penguins of Madagascar (2014) (producer)
- Ron's Gone Wrong (2021) (producer)
- That Christmas (2024) (executive producer)
