= Simon Otto =

Swiss director, animator and storyboard artist

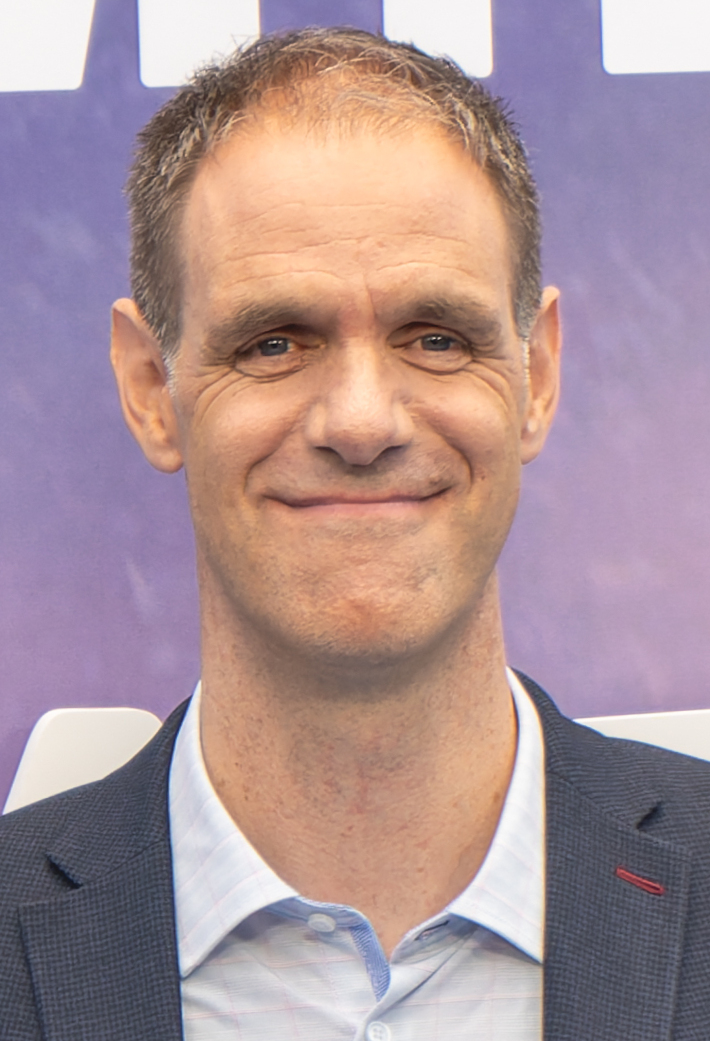
- Otto at the 2024 BFI London Film Festival premiere of That Christmas
- Born: Uznach, Switzerland
- Education: Gobelins Imagery School
- Occupations: Director; Animator; Storyboard artist
- Years active: 1997–present
- Employer: DreamWorks Animation (1997–2019)
- Known for: Head of character animation on How to Train Your Dragon
- Spouse: Fumi Kitahara (deceased)
- Children: Max (son)
- Honours: VES Awards for a Visual Effects Society Award for Outstanding Visual Effects in an Animated Feature

Simon Otto is a Swiss director, animator and storyboard artist. He is best known for working as the head of character animation of the Academy Award-nominated How to Train Your Dragon film trilogy for DreamWorks Animation.

== Life and career ==
Simon Otto was born in Uznach, Switzerland and grew up in Gommiswald in the Canton of St. Gallen. After completing a banking apprenticeship, Otto started his career in the arts by carving commercial snow sculptures in nearby resort towns and drawing news cartoons for his hometown newspaper "Die Suedostschweiz".

Otto studied art formally at the F+F Schule für Experimentelle Gestaltung (now F+F School of Art & Design) in Zurich. In 1995, Otto left Switzerland to study animation at Gobelins Imagery School in Paris, France where he also received additional animation training through an internship with Walt Disney Feature Animation Paris.

Otto's professional animation career started in 1997 when he was hired by DreamWorks Animation in Los Angeles, California to work as a traditional character animator on the studio's first traditional animated feature film The Prince of Egypt (1998). Otto then spent 21 years as part of the character animation team working on both 2D and CGI projects for the studio. He is particularly known for his work as the head of character animation for the How to Train Your Dragon movie trilogy and has been instrumental in developing the look of the characters and their personalities and the overall style of animation for the films.

Otto was rewarded for his achievements with the VES Awards for a Visual Effects Society Award for Outstanding Visual Effects in an Animated Feature in 2011 by the Visual Effect Society. Otto designed a number of characters in How to Train Your Dragon and did storyboarding work on the second film and the third film. He was a key contributor to the development of Premo, the animation software developed at DreamWorks Animation that won an Academy Award for Technical Achievement.

Involved as a member of the Academy of Motion Picture Arts and Sciences, Otto participates in numerous of events, talks and interviews by highlighting the work of animation in the feature film industry. In 2016, Otto founded LuMAA (Lucerne Master Academy of Animation) with the Lucerne University of Applied Sciences and Arts in Lucerne, Switzerland where animation industry veterans teach a 6-week summer course for up and coming talents.

In 2019 after 21 years of working for DreamWorks Animation, Otto left the studio. He now works as an independent director on various film and television projects. Otto's first released television project after leaving DreamWorks Animation was the episode "The Tall Grass" that he directed for season 2 of the Netflix adult animated anthology television series Love, Death & Robots.

On 14 June 2021, it was announced that Otto would direct the 2024 Netflix and Locksmith Animation film That Christmas (in his feature film directorial debut) which is based on That Christmas and Other Stories, a trilogy of children's Christmas books written by Richard Curtis and illustrated by Rebecca Cobb.

== Filmography ==
=== Director ===
- Dragons: Race to the Edge (2016) (TV series) (2 episodes from season 5 only)
- Trollhunters: Tales of Arcadia (2016) (TV series) (1 episode from season 1 only)
- Love, Death & Robots (2021) (TV series) (1 episode from season 2 only)
- A Tale Dark & Grimm (2021) (TV miniseries) (supervising director)
- That Christmas (2024) (movie) (Otto's feature film directorial debut)

=== Producer ===
- A Tale Dark & Grimm (2021) (TV miniseries) (executive producer)

=== Art department ===
- How to Train Your Dragon 2 (2014) (movie) (story artist)
- How to Train Your Dragon: The Hidden World (2019) (movie) (storyboard artist)

=== Animation department ===
- The Prince of Egypt (1998) (movie) (animator for "Moses")
- The Road to El Dorado (2000) (movie) (animator for "Altivo" and "Cortes")
- Spirit: Stallion of the Cimarron (2002) (movie) (animator for "Spirit" and supervising animator for "Eagle")
- Sinbad: Legend of the Seven Seas (2003) (movie) (animator for "Jin and Li" and supervising animator for "Sinbad" and "Jin and Li")
- Cyclops Island (2003) (short film) (supervising animator)
- Shark Tale (2004) (movie) (animator)
- Over the Hedge (2006) (movie) (additional character designer)
- Flushed Away (2006) (movie) (supervising animator)
- Enchanted (2007) (movie) (additional animator)
- Bee Movie (2007) (movie) (additional animator)
- Kung Fu Panda (2008) (movie) (additional animator and traditional animator)
- How to Train Your Dragon (2010) (movie) (head of character animation)
- Legend of the Boneknapper Dragon (2010) (short film) (supervising animator)
- Gift of the Night Fury (2011) (short film) (animation consultant and story artist)
- Book of Dragons (2011) (short film) (head of character animation)
- How to Train Your Dragon 2 (2014) (movie) (story artist and head of character animation)
- Home (2015) (movie) (additional supervising animator)
- Bird Karma (2018) (short film) (animator)
- How to Train Your Dragon: The Hidden World (2019) (movie) (story artist and head of character animation)
- The Call of the Wild (2020) (movie) (animation consultant)
- Rumble (2021) (movie) (animation consultant)

=== Self ===
- HBO First Look (2006–2010) (TV series) (2 episodes only)
- Kulturplatz (2014) (TV series) (1 episode only)
- Creative Spark (2015) (TV series) (1 episode from season 1 only)
- Agora.Community (2021) (podcast series) (1 episode only)
- LCJ Q&A Podcast (2021–2024) (podcast series) (2 episodes only)
