= Annie Award for Outstanding Achievement for Production Design in an Animated Feature Production =

United States animation industry award

Annie Award for Production Design in a Feature Production
- Awarded for: Excellence in film animation
- Country: United States
- Presented by: ASIFA-Hollywood
- First award: Deane Taylor for The Nightmare Before Christmas (1994)
- Currently held by: Helen Chen, Dave Bleich, Wendell Dalit, Scott Watanabe, and Celine Kim for KPop Demon Hunters (2025)
- Website: http://annieawards.org

The Annie Award for Best Production Design in an Animated Feature Production is an Annie Award first presented in 1994. Since then, it is annually awarded to the animation industry's best or excellent work performed in the areas of overall production design and art direction for sets of animated feature films.

== Winners and nominees ==
=== 1990s ===
Year	Winners and nominees	Film/Television/Exhibition
1994 (22nd)
1994 (22nd)	Deane Taylor (art director)	The Nightmare Before Christmas
1994 (22nd)	Andy Gaskill (art director)	The Lion King
1994 (22nd)	Mark Henn (supervising animator)	The Lion King
1994 (22nd)	Scott F. Johnston (artistic supervisor)	The Lion King
1994 (22nd)	Paul Rudish (art director)	2 Stupid Dogs
1995 (23rd)
1995 (23rd)	Michael Giaimo (art director)	Pocahontas
1995 (23rd)	Fred Warter (production designer)	A Goofy Movie
1995 (23rd)	Kazuyoshi Takeuchi (production designer)	Gargoyles
1995 (23rd)	Rasoul Azadani (layout artistic supervisor)	Pocahontas
1995 (23rd)	Adrian Penn (art director)	Weiss Energy Hall: The Origin of Energy
1996 (24th)
1996 (24th)	Ralph Eggleston	Toy Story
1996 (24th)	Hans Bacher	Balto
1996 (24th)	Hiroshi Ôno	Gargoyles
1996 (24th)	Takashi Watabe and Hiromasa Ogura	Ghost in the Shell
1996 (24th)	David Goetz	The Hunchback of Notre Dame
1998 (26th)
1998 (26th)	Hans Bacher	Mulan
1999 (27th)
1999 (27th)	Alan Bodner	The Iron Giant
1999 (27th)	John Bell	Antz
1999 (27th)	William Cone	A Bug's Life
1999 (27th)	Mark Whiting	The Iron Giant
1999 (27th)	Daniel St. Pierre	Tarzan

=== 2000s ===
Year	Winners and nominees	Film
2000 (28th)
2000 (28th)	Susan Goldberg	Fantasia 2000
2000 (28th)	Christian Schellewald	The Road to El Dorado
2000 (28th)	Paul & Gaetan Brizzi	Fantasia 2000
2000 (28th)	Phillip A. Cruden	Titan A. E
2000 (28th)	William Cone and Jim Pearson	Toy Story 2
2001 (29th)
2001 (29th)	Guillaume Aretos	Shrek
2001 (29th)	David Goetz	Atlantis: The Lost Empire
2001 (29th)	Colin Stimpson	The Emperor's New Groove
2001 (29th)	Steve Pilcher	Osmosis Jones
2001 (29th)	Douglas Rogers	Shrek
2002 (30th)
2002 (30th)	Luc Desmarchelier	Spirit: Stallion of the Cimarron
2002 (30th)	Brian McEntee	Ice Age
2002 (30th)	Ric Sluiter	Lilo and Stitch
2002 (30th)	Harley Jessup	Monsters, Inc.
2002 (30th)	Steven Olds	Treasure Planet
2003 (31st)
2003 (31st)	Ralph Eggleston	Finding Nemo
2003 (31st)	Robh Ruppel	Brother Bear
2003 (31st)	Seth Engstrom	Sinbad: Legend of the Seven Seas
2003 (31st)	Raymond Zibach	Sinbad: Legend of the Seven Seas
2003 (31st)	Bill Perkins	101 Dalmatians II: Patch's London Adventure
2004 (32nd)
2004 (32nd)	Lou Romano	The Incredibles
2004 (32nd)	Pierre-Olivier Vincent	Shark Tale
2004 (32nd)	Samuel Michlap	Shark Tale
2004 (32nd)	Armand Baltazar	Shark Tale
2004 (32nd)	Scott Fassett	Springtime with Roo
2005 (33rd)
2005 (33rd)	Phil Lewis	Wallace and Gromit: The Curse of the Were-Rabbit
2005 (33rd)	David Womersley, Dan Cooper, Ian Gooding and Mac George	Chicken Little
2005 (33rd)	Dennis A. Greco	Lilo & Stitch 2: Stitch Has A Glitch
2005 (33rd)	Yoriko Ito	Madagascar
2005 (33rd)	William Joyce and Steve Martino	Robots
2006 (34th)
2006 (34th)	Pierre-Olivier Vincent	Flushed Away
2006 (34th)	William Cone	Cars
2006 (34th)	Andy Harkness	Open Season
2006 (34th)	Michael Humphries	Open Season
2006 (34th)	Paul Shardlow	Over the Hedge
2007 (35th)
2007 (35th)	Harley Jessup	Ratatouille
2007 (35th)	Doug Chiang	Beowulf
2007 (35th)	Marcelo Vignali	Surf's Up
2008 (36th)
2008 (36th)	Tang Heng	Kung Fu Panda
2008 (36th)	Paul Felix	Bolt
2008 (36th)	Raymond Zibach	Kung Fu Panda
2008 (36th)	Evgeni Tomov	The Tale of Despereaux
2008 (36th)	Ralph Eggleston	WALL-E
2009 (37th)
2009 (37th)	Tadahiro Uesugi	Coraline
2009 (37th)	Ian Gooding	The Princess and the Frog
2009 (37th)	Chris Appelhans	Coraline
2009 (37th)	Christophe Vacher	9

=== 2010s ===
Year	Winners and nominees	Film
2010 (38th)
2010 (38th)	Pierre-Olivier Vincent	How to Train Your Dragon
2010 (38th)	Yarrow Cheney	Despicable Me
2010 (38th)	Eric Guillon	Despicable Me
2010 (38th)	Dan-hee Ryu	Legend of the Guardians: The Owls of Ga'Hoole
2010 (38th)	Peter Zaslav	Shrek Forever After
2011 (39th)
2011 (39th)	Raymond Zibach	Kung Fu Panda 2
2011 (39th)	Harley Jessup	Cars 2
2011 (39th)	Tom Cardone, Kyle Macnaughton and Peter Chan	Rio
2011 (39th)	Paul Felix	Winnie the Pooh
2012 (40th)
2012 (40th)	Steve Pilcher	Brave
2012 (40th)	Rick Heinrichs	Frankenweenie
2012 (40th)	Marcelo Vignali	Hotel Transylvania
2012 (40th)	Nash Dunnigan, Arden Chan and Kyle Macnaughton	Ice Age: Continental Drift
2012 (40th)	Kendal Cronkhite, Shannon Jeffries, Lindsey Olivares and Kenard Pak	Madagascar 3: Europe's Most Wanted
2012 (40th)	Nelson Lowry, Ean McNamara, Trevor Dalmer, Pete Oswald and Ross Stewart	ParaNorman
2012 (40th)	Norman Garwood and Matt Perry	The Pirates! In an Adventure with Scientists!
2012 (40th)	Patrick Hanenberger, Max Boas, Jayee Borcar, Woon Jung, Perry Maple, Peter Maynez, Stan Seo and Felix Yoon	Rise of the Guardians
2013 (41st)
2013 (41st)	David Womersley, Michael Giaimo and Lisa Keene	Frozen
2013 (41st)	Christophe Lautrette, Paul Duncan and Dominique Louis	The Croods
2013 (41st)	Yarrow Cheney and Eric Guillon	Despicable Me 2
2013 (41st)	William Joyce, Greg Couch and Michael Knapp	Epic
2013 (41st)	Zaza and Zyk	Ernest & Celestine
2013 (41st)	Ricky Nierva, Robert Kondo and Daisuke "Dice" Tsutsumi	Monsters University
2014 (42nd)
2014 (42nd)	Paul Lasaine, August Hall and Tom McClure	The Boxtrolls
2014 (42nd)	Simon Valdimir Varela and Paul Sullivan	The Book of Life
2014 (42nd)	Grant Freckelton	The Lego Movie
2014 (42nd)	David James, Priscilla Wong, Ruben Perez, Timothy Lamb and Alexandre Puvilland	Mr. Peabody & Sherman
2014 (42nd)	Adrien Merigeau	Song of the Sea
2015 (43rd)
2015 (43rd)	Ralph Eggleston	Inside Out
2015 (43rd)	Alê Abreu	Boy and the World
2015 (43rd)	Harley Jessup, Sharon Calahan, Bryn Imagire, Noah Klocek and Huy Nguyen	The Good Dinosaur
2015 (43rd)	Jason Carpenter	He Named Me Malala
2015 (43rd)	Emil Metev	Home
2015 (43rd)	Eric Guillon	Minions
2015 (43rd)	Matt Perry and Gavin Lines	Shaun the Sheep Movie
2016 (44th)
2016 (44th)	Nelson Lowry, Trevor Dalmer, August Hall and Ean McNamara	Kubo and the Two Strings
2016 (44th)	Raymond Zibach and Max Boas	Kung Fu Panda 3
2016 (44th)	Lou Romano, Alex Juhasz and Celine Desrumaux	The Little Prince
2016 (44th)	Kendal Cronkhite and Timothy Lamb	Trolls
2016 (44th)	David Goetz and Matthias Lechner	Zootopia
2017 (45th)
2017 (45th)	Harley Jessup, Danielle Feinberg, Bryn Imagire, Nathaniel McLaughlin and Ernesto Nemesio	Coco
2017 (45th)	Ciaran Duffy, Julien Regnard and Daby Zainab Faidhi	The Breadwinner
2017 (45th)	Tom Cardone, Arden Chan, Andrew Hickson, Mike Lee and Jason Sadler	Ferdinand
2017 (45th)	Florent Masurel, Pierre-antoine Moelo, Jean-Jacques Cournoyer and Julien Meillard	Leap!
2017 (45th)	Tomotaka Kubo, Tomoya Imai and Satoko Nakamura	Mary and the Witch's Flower
2018 (46th)
2018 (46th)	Justin K. Thompson	Spider-Man: Into the Spider-Verse
2018 (46th)	Matt Perry and Richard Edmunds	Early Man
2018 (46th)	Scott Wills (production designer)	Hotel Transylvania 3: Summer Vacation
2018 (46th)	Adam Stockhausen and Paul Harrod	Isle of Dogs
2018 (46th)	Jeff Turley	Mary Poppins Returns
2019 (47th)
2019 (47th)	Szymon Biernacki and Marcin Jakubowski	Klaus
2019 (47th)	Max Boas, Paul Duncan, Christopher Brock, Celine DaHyeu Kim and Jane Li	Abominable
2019 (47th)	Pierre-Olivier Vincent, Kirsten Kawamura, Woonyoung Jung and Iuri Lioi	How to Train Your Dragon: The Hidden World
2019 (47th)	Nelson Lowry, Santiago Montiel and Trevor Dalmer	Missing Link
2019 (47th)	Patricia Atchison, Maisha Moore, Chris Souza and Jack Yu	The Addams Family

=== 2020s ===
Year	Winners and nominees	Film
2020 (48th)
2020 (48th)	María Pareja, Ross Stewart and Tomm Moore	Wolfwalkers
2020 (48th)	Noah Klocek, Sharon Calahan, Huy Nguyen, Bert Berry and Paul Conrad	Onward
2020 (48th)	Steve Pilcher, Albert Lozano, Paul Abadilla and Bryn Imagire	Soul
2020 (48th)	Kyle McQueen	The Willoughbys
2020 (48th)	Kendal Cronkhite Shaindlin and Timothy Lamb	Trolls World Tour
2021 (49th)
2021 (49th)	Lindsey Olivares, Toby Wilson and Dave Bleich	The Mitchells vs. the Machines
2021 (49th)	Tomm Moore, Ross Stewart, Alice Dieudonné, Almu Redondo and Maria Pareja	Belle
2021 (49th)	Paul Felix, Mingjue Helen Chen and Cory Loftis	Raya and the Last Dragon
2021 (49th)	Aurélien Predal, Till Nowak and Nathan Crowley	Ron's Gone Wrong
2021 (49th)	Carlos Zaragoza, Wendell Dalit and Andy Harkness	Vivo
2022 (50th)
2022 (50th)	Curt Enderle and Guy Davis	Guillermo del Toro's Pinocchio
2022 (50th)	Phil Tippett	Mad God
2022 (50th)	Nate Wragg, Joseph Feinsilver, Claire Keane, Wayne Tsay and Naveen Selvanathan	Puss in Boots: The Last Wish
2022 (50th)	Luc Desmarchelier and Floriane Marchix	The Bad Guys
2022 (50th)	Matthias Lechner and Jung Woonyoung	The Sea Beast
2023 (51st)
2023 (51st)	Patrick O'Keefe and Dean Gordon	Spider-Man: Across the Spider-Verse
2023 (51st)	Yoji Takeshige	The Boy and the Heron
2023 (51st)	Don Shank, Maria Yi, Dan Holland, Jennifer Chang and Laura Meyer	Elemental
2023 (51st)	Aidan Sugano and Jeff Turley	Nimona
2023 (51st)	Yashar Kassai, Arthur Fong and Tiffany Lam	Teenage Mutant Ninja Turtles: Mutant Mayhem
2024 (52nd)
2024 (52nd)	Raymond Zibach and Ritchie Sacilioc	The Wild Robot
2024 (52nd)	Jason Deamer, Josh West, Keiko Murayama, Bill Zahn and Laura Meyer	Inside Out 2
2024 (52nd)	Justin Hutchinson-Chatburn and Mike Redman	That Christmas
2024 (52nd)	Ultraman: Rising Production Design Team	Ultraman: Rising
2024 (52nd)	Matt Perry, Darren Dubicki, Richard Edmunds, Matt Sanders and Gavin Lines	Wallace & Gromit: Vengeance Most Fowl
2025 (53rd)
2025 (53rd)	Helen Chen, Dave Bleich, Wendell Dalit, Scott Watanabe and Celine Kim	KPop Demon Hunters
2025 (53rd)	Harley Jessup, Ernesto Nemesio, Maria Lee, Kristian Norelius and Kyle Jones	Elio
2025 (53rd)	Luc Desmarchelier and Floriane Marchix	The Bad Guys 2
2025 (53rd)	Estefania Pantoja, Alexandre Diboine, Clement Dartigues, Fernando Peque and Remi Salmon	The Twits
2025 (53rd)	Cory Loftis and Limei Z. Hshieh	Zootopia 2

== Multiple wins ==
3 wins

- Ralph Eggleston

2 wins

- Michael Giaimo
- Harley Jessup
- Pierre-Olivier Vincent

== See also ==
- Art Directors Guild Award for Excellence in Production Design for an Animated Film
