= Ron's Gone Wrong =

2021 animated film

- Theatrical release poster
- Directed by: Sarah Smith; Jean-Philippe Vine
- Written by: Peter Baynham; Sarah Smith
- Produced by: Julie Lockhart; Lara Breay
- Starring: Zach Galifianakis; Jack Dylan Grazer; Ed Helms; Justice Smith; Rob Delaney; Kylie Cantrall; Ricardo Hurtado; Olivia Colman
- Cinematography: David Peers; Hailey White
- Edited by: David Burrows
- Music by: Henry Jackman
- Production companies: 20th Century Studios; Locksmith Animation
- Distributed by: 20th Century Studios
- Release dates: 9 October 2021 (BFI); 15 October 2021 (United Kingdom); 22 October 2021 (United States)
- Running time: 107 minutes
- Countries: United Kingdom; United States
- Language: English
- Box office: $60.7 million

Ron's Gone Wrong is a 2021 animated science fiction comedy film directed by Sarah Smith and Jean-Philippe Vine, and written by Smith and Peter Baynham. The voice cast features Zach Galifianakis, Jack Dylan Grazer, Ed Helms, Justice Smith, Rob Delaney, Kylie Cantrall, Ricardo Hurtado, and Olivia Colman. The film follows Barney (Grazer), a socially awkward middle-schooler who, after the release of a popular line of robots, receives and befriends a defective robot he names Ron (Galifianakis).

Ron's Gone Wrong was the first feature film from Locksmith Animation and was animated by DNEG Animation, and made in association with TSG Entertainment. Animation and voice acting for the film were all done remotely during the COVID-19 pandemic.

The film had its world premiere at the 65th BFI London Film Festival on 9 October 2021, and was theatrically released in the United Kingdom on 15 October, and in the United States on 22 October, by 20th Century Studios. It grossed $60.7 million and received generally positive reviews from critics.

== Plot ==
Tech giant Bubble unveils their latest creation: the Bubble Bot (or B-Bot for short), created by Bubble's CEO Marc Wydell with the intent to make a robot buddy that is designed to help make friends via algorithm. In the town of Nonsuch, California, 12-year-old Barney Pudowski, whose mother has died, is the only pupil in his class who does not have a B-Bot. His former childhood friends, Savannah Meades, Rich Belcher, Noah, and Ava have all become absorbed by their individual B-Bots. On Barney's birthday, his father, Graham, and his 77-year-old Bulgarian grandmother, Donka, come to realize that he does not have any friends. They hastily go to a Bubble store, but it closes for the day, leading them to take a slightly damaged one that fell from a delivery van.

Barney receives the B-Bot as his late-birthday gift, but upon activating it, he quickly learns that it is defective and glitchy. Not wanting to upset his father, Barney decides to take it back to the Bubble store to get it fixed, but ends up running into Rich and his friends, who taunt and try to humiliate Barney. The B-Bot begins to fight back as his safety functions have been disabled, with him and Barney happily running off. However, Rich calls the police and they, along with Graham and Donka, are taken to the Bubble store so that the B-Bot can be recycled. Not wanting to see him go, Barney secretly rescues him and names him Ron Bintscatsco, after his model number; R0NB1NT5CAT5CO.

When Barney and Ron's actions are reported, Marc is happy to see Ron go against his programming while his fellow executive Andrew Morris views it as bad publicity, believing Ron must be destroyed for the issue to be resolved. Barney teaches Ron how to be a good friend and, while hanging out, runs into Savannah, who shows Ron that his purpose is to help Barney get friends. Despite Barney telling Savannah not to, she posts Ron's actions online, alerting Bubble. The next day, Ron gets out of the house and tries to get "friends" for Barney, bringing a series of random people to school. After Barney gets in trouble, Rich discovers Ron's unlocked function and downloads it, causing all the other B-Bots to have their safety features turned off. The B-Bots run wild, prompting a patch update to be sent to them, but not before Savannah is publicly humiliated.

Barney is kicked out from school and tells Ron off, but upon returning home, realizes that Ron was just trying to be a friend exactly the way he was taught. He decides to run away with Ron when Bubble employees come for them. They briefly run into Savannah, still upset over her incident, and Barney tells her that he's going to hide in the woods. Meanwhile, while Andrew warns Marc about the ramifications of the B-Bot, Marc sneaks away so that he can meet Ron. Andrew sends all nearby B-Bots to track them down.

Barney and Ron spend the night in the woods, which at first they enjoy. However, the following day, a storm rolls in and Ron, whose battery has run out, powers down. They are soon pursued by the B-Bots, but they manage to escape and hide in a ditch, triggering an asthma attack for Barney. Andrew, deciding that Ron disappearing will be better for the company, decides to call off the B-Bots, effectively leaving Barney to die. Due to the cold weather, Barney becomes weak and Ron, using his last bit power, brings him back to civilization just outside the school where Savannah, Rich, Noah, and Ava rush out to help him. Ron shuts down for good.

Barney is taken to the hospital and recuperates before meeting Marc, who has patched Ron to make him like every other B-Bot. Barney demands that Marc access the cloud to get Ron's original personality, but Andrew has since taken over the company and locked Marc out. Through an elaborate plan in which Barney, Graham, Donka and Marc break into Bubble HQ, Barney manages to make it to the Bubble database, finds Ron's original data and uploads him back into his body, restoring him back to his original code. Seeing that Bubble has direct access to everyone's B-Bot and realizing that Savannah, Rich, Noah, and Ava are just as lonely as he was, Barney suggests upgrading all the B-Bots to have Ron's flaws. However, this means that Ron will be dispersed. Barney reluctantly says goodbye to Ron as his programming is spread to everyone, mixing Marc's friendship algorithm with Ron's code. Marc blackmails Andrew into giving his position of CEO back after secretly recording him admitting that the B-Bots spy on their owners for profit.

Three months later, everyone has a faulty B-Bot, but are happy with their weird and wild personalities. Barney (who is now allowed back in school) no longer has one, but has become much more sociable and has gotten close with his former friends (which includes deleting the humiliating video of Savannah). As they hang out at recess, a giant Bubble tower that overlooks Nonsuch produces Ron's face, implying that he is still alive.

== Voice cast ==
- Zach Galifianakis as Ron, Barney's malfunctioning B-Bot.
- Jack Dylan Grazer as Barney Pudowski, a socially awkward, lonesome middle-schooler.
- Ed Helms as Graham Pudowski, Barney's father and Donka's son.
- Olivia Colman as Donka Pudowski, Barney's grandmother and Graham's mother, who was born in Bulgaria.
- Rob Delaney as Andrew Morris, an executive of Bubble corporation.
- Justice Smith as Marc Wydell, the creator of the B-bot and the CEO of Bubble.
- Kylie Cantrall as Savannah Meades, Barney's popular classmate.
- Ricardo Hurtado as Rich Belcher, Barney's classmate who bullies Barney.
- Cullen James McCarthy as Noah, Barney's classmate who loves video games.
- Ava Morse as Ava, Barney's classmate who loves science.
- Marcus Scribner as Alex, one of Rich's cronies.
- Thomas Barbusca as Jayden, one of Rich's cronies.
- Ruby Wax as Ms. Hartley, Barney's middle school principal.
- Sarah Miller as Bree, a Bubble store manager.
- Krupa Pattani as Sita, a colleague of Andrew Morris.
- Megan Maczko as Miss Thomas, Barney's middle school teacher.
- Audrey Hsieh as Harper, Savannah's close friend.
- Bentley Kalu as an unnamed African-American police officer.
- John Macmillan and Brent Montrego as Bubble Techs.
- David Menkin as:
  - Shayne the Biker
  - Mr. Cleaver, Barney's extremely strict middle school coach.
- Iara Nemirovsky as Ellie.
- Liam Payne as an unnamed B-bot that gets kicked by Andrew in a cameo appearance.

== Production ==
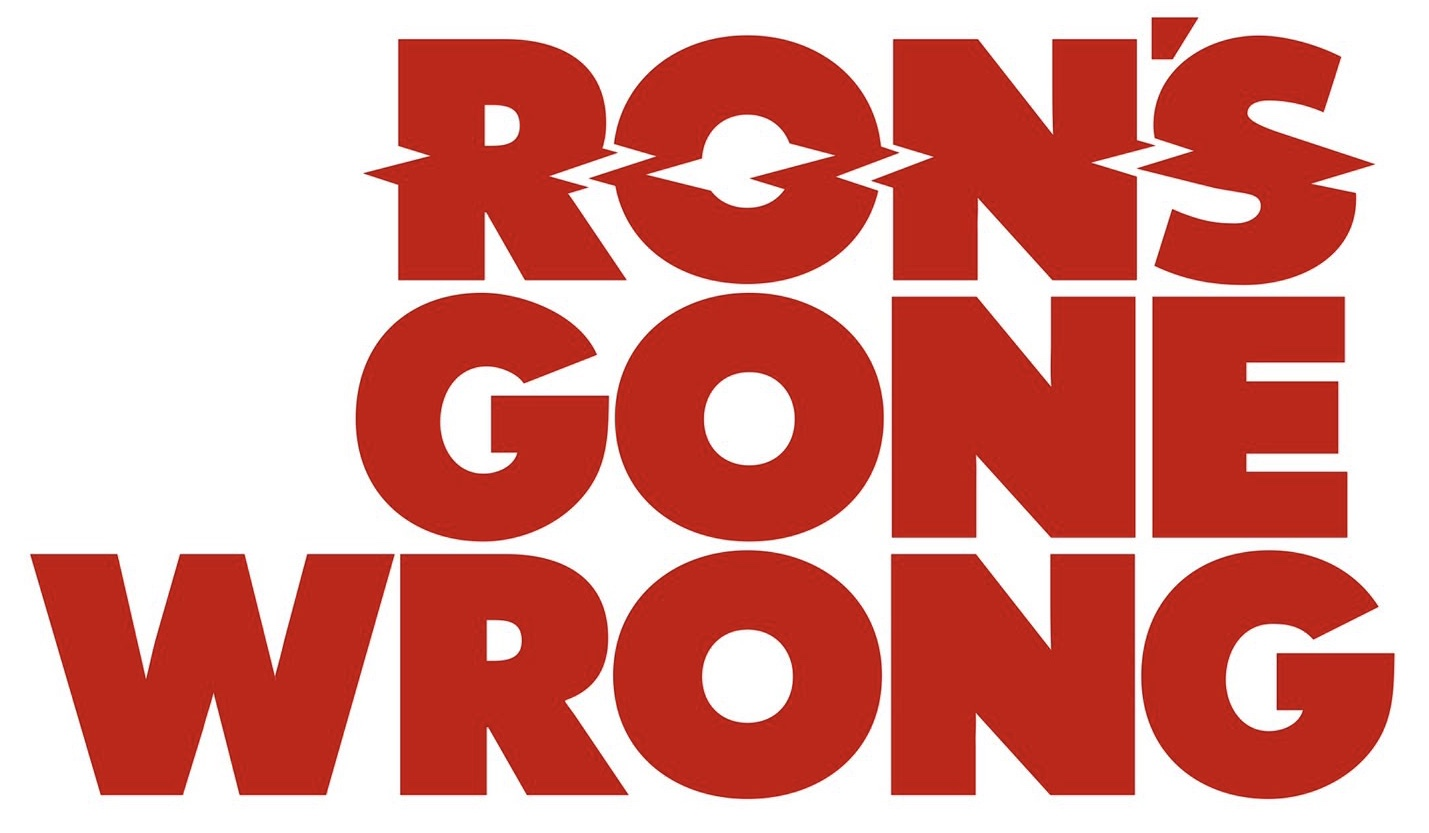
The film's title logo

=== Development and production ===
After founding Locksmith Animation, Sarah Smith wanted to create a film that observed the impact of the internet on children's relationships and self-esteem, which she realised could be made into a film after watching Her (2013), commenting "we have to make that film for kids, to [help] them evaluate those experiences". Smith approached Peter Baynham with one paragraph of story where a robot learns through imitation, Smith said that Baynham asked "what if it was an idiot and it was annoying?" Despite creating a British animated film, a creative decision was made to set it in a United States suburb. Locksmith co-founder Julie Lockhart explained, "From a design perspective, the fact that all the big tech companies are in California made it feel that's where it should be. We're also making films for a global audience that may not specifically be about British culture."

Locksmith had a troubled history in securing a distributor for the project. In May 2016, the studio formed a production deal with Paramount Pictures in which they would distribute Locksmith's films under their Paramount Animation banner. However, the following year Paramount abandoned the deal when Paramount chairman and CEO Brad Grey was replaced by Jim Gianopulos. In September 2017, Locksmith formed a multi-year production deal with 20th Century Fox, which would distribute their films under the 20th Century Fox Animation label with Locksmith aiming to theatrically release a film every 12–18 months. Their deal was for 20th Century Fox to bolster Blue Sky Studios' output and replace the loss of distributing DreamWorks Animation films, which are now owned and distributed by Universal Pictures, following its acquisition by NBCUniversal in August 2016. The acquisition of 20th Century Fox by Disney in March 2019 led to concern that the distribution deal would be lost again. Smith said the resulting acquisition was "terrifying", and described the prospect of promoting the project to Disney executives as "carrying coals to Newcastle", but ultimately they were supportive of the project. After production began on the film, Locksmith moved to Warner Bros. Pictures for two animated feature films.

On 12 October 2017, it was announced that the project would be titled Ron's Gone Wrong, and will serve as the first animated feature film from Locksmith. Alessandro Carloni and Jean-Phillipe Vine were announced to serve as the film's co-directors with Octavio E. Rodriguez. The visual effects company Double Negative was on board as a digital production partner to provide the film's computer animation as its first project from its feature animation division. Also, Baynham, who previously worked with Smith on Arthur Christmas (2011), and Elisabeth Murdoch were announced to executive produce the film with Smith.

In test screenings, Smith was surprised to find that Donka was a popular character with children. The scene where Donka dances on a table with Ron was a favorite scene for children, and Smith viewed this as "comedy there that they haven't seen before".

=== Casting ===
Grazer first began recording lines for the role of Barney in 2017 when he was 13 and did not finalize his role until early 2021 by the time he was 18. Grazer said that it became difficult to maintain his 13-year-old prepubescent voice throughout the years of recording. He was originally introduced as a test voice for early animatics, but Smith kept him on after being astounded by the emotional range of his performance.

Galifianakis was instructed to perform much of his lines for the role of Ron in a deadpan voice, to convey that Ron is run by an algorithm and is not very emotional. He commented that this was challenging and unusual, because he had never had directors in the past ask for "less" emotion. Smith praised Helms' performance in the role of Graham for skillfully improvising lines and contributing additional "touches" to the film, saying "You give him the lines and he'll do six versions of his own and he's hilarious".

=== Animation ===
The character of Ron was designed to be aesthetically reminiscent of "stripped-down" computer software, with the pixelated interfaces of the MS-DOS operating system being a source of inspiration. Emphasis was placed on allowing Ron's animated performance to be versatile within the constraints of his design, which demanded precise control over his motion graphics skin that deliver his facial expressions. This included allowing his face slide all across his body, such as his eyeballs appearing between his legs when picked up. Baynham explained "he doesn't have a face that you can do all the classic things with, but somehow he does... like the way his eye might slip a little bit... that speaks to his simple clownishness." Vine referred to Ron's behaviour as being alike to the Clippy personal assistant, describing him "cheerfully and annoyingly helpful all the time". Locksmith consulted with the toy designer Sphero to investigate what would be a realistic design for a social media robot. Vine said, "we wanted the movie to feel like it's set right around now so the bot needs to feel tangible". Animation director Eric Leighton explained that it was important to track the emotional state of Ron to determine his range of behaviour. The scene where Ron physically attacks children is where he is "the most broken that a robot could possibly be", and the scene where he is reprogrammed is at his most benign. The whole movie was shot out of sequence in favor of doing scenes across his degrees of "brokenness". The character design of Barney was distinguished through coordinated color palettes; Barney's clothes are patterned in "earth tones" to indicate his love of nature, and his home is vibrant in contrast to the muted colors of other homes in the town he lives in.

DNEG had to develop a new "shot-based" animation process for creating the film, in changeover from previously specializing in visual effects for live-action cinema. The animation software Pixar RenderMan was used for the film, and the Universal Scene Description file format was adopted a third of the way during production.

Production was impacted by the COVID-19 pandemic in 2020. Animation for the film was done remotely with crew members working from home, which included digital modelling, rigging, and lighting. Editors faced difficulty assembling footage with temporarily out-of-sync audio, which impaired judgement over the timing of edits. Voice acting was also done remotely, and involved makeshift home recording setups where blankets were used for soundproofing. A voice actor even had to ask family members sharing an internet connection to come offline, in order to free bandwidth for a recording session.

A labor dispute arose over DNEG announcing 20%-25% pay cuts to employees earning more than £35,000 per year, which it said was due to business disruption caused by COVID-19. This led to 169 employees signing a collective grievance statement. The move was later partially reversed; DNEG was forced to reach deals with its business partners, this included Locksmith who agreed to offer a salary top-up and completion bonus to employees working on the film. The trade union BECTU condemned DNEG for its refusal to communicate with the union, and said its response to the collective grievance was deliberately indirect. The film took approximately five years to complete.

=== Musical score and soundtrack album ===
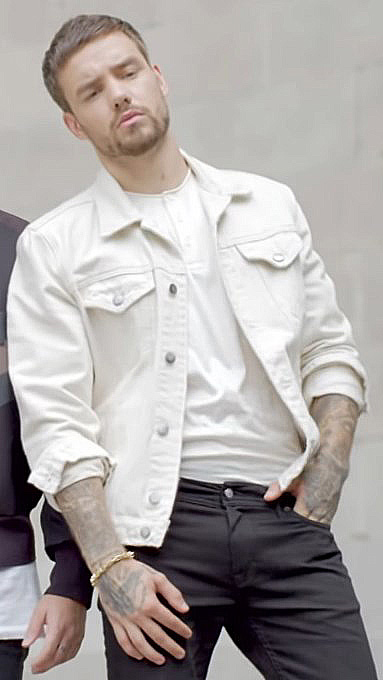
Liam Payne performed an original song titled "Sunshine" and its music video was released on August 27, 2021.

Henry Jackman composed the film score. Speaking about the score, Jackman said that "it has its own identity, similar to Wreck-It Ralph or Big Hero 6" having the "same musical landscape and color in this film", and also had enjoyed working in the film, calling the scoring sessions as "enormous fun". Vine and Smith expressed gratitude to Jackman on how his score elevated the film. Smith wanted the score to have a "contemporary John Hughes feel along with a classic 'high school movie' vibe and the orchestral scale and emotion of E.T. on top". The score was recorded at Abbey Road Studios and Air Studios in London, England.

Jackman composed most of the tracks, with two songs in collaboration with Dave Bayley of the indie-pop band Glass Animals. Liam Payne performed an original song titled "Sunshine" and its music video was released on August 27, 2021. The soundtrack was released digitally on 15 October 2021, by Walt Disney Records and in physical formats on 22 October as the first 20th Century Studios soundtrack film to be released under the main Walt Disney Records label.

== Release ==
In October 2017, Ron's Gone Wrong was scheduled for a theatrical release on 6 November 2020. In November 2019, the film was moved to 26 February 2021. In May 2020, the film was moved to 23 April 2021, as a result of the COVID-19 pandemic. On 22 January 2021, the film was then delayed further to 22 October 2021, in RealD 3D originally. The film also had its world premiere as the headlining act of the 65th BFI London Film Festival on 9 October 2021, making it a Special BFI Presentation. On the same date, the film premiered at the 36th Guadalajara International Film Festival's Guadalajara opening celebration event. The film premiered in United Kingdom on 15 October 2021. The film also held a special surprise screening premiere at the El Capitan Theatre on the day of its USA theatrical release date of 22 October 2021. The film played exclusively in theaters for 45 days before heading to digital platforms.

=== Marketing and promotion ===
Tomy made a deal with Disney Consumer Products and Locksmith to develop and promote the film's toys including plush toys and action figures.

=== Home media ===
Ron's Gone Wrong was released on DVD, Blu-ray and Ultra HD Blu-ray on 7 December 2021, and on Digital on 15 December 2021, by Walt Disney Studios Home Entertainment. Special features include Questions and Answers with Jack Dylan Grazer and Zach Galifianakis called "A Boy and His B-bot", a Making Ron Right featurette and the music video of the film's soundtrack album's original song, "Sunshine". Ron's Gone Wrong became available for streaming on HBO Max and Disney+ on 15 December 2021.

In the United States, Ron's Gone Wrong placed seventh on Fandango at Home's weekly digital sales and rental chart for the week ending December 19, following its premium digital release on December 15. Streaming analytics firm FlixPatrol, which monitors daily updated VOD charts and streaming ratings worldwide, reported that it placed No.1 among films on Disney+ in the United States two days after its release on the platform. Nielsen Media Research, which records streaming viewership on certain American television screens, announced that Ron's Gone Wrong was the third most-streamed film between December 13–19, generating 378 million minutes of watch time.

== Reception ==
=== Box office ===
Ron's Gone Wrong grossed $23 million in the United States and Canada and $37.7 million in other territories for a worldwide total of $60.7 million. In the United States and Canada, the film was released alongside Dune, and was projected to gross around $10 million from 3,065 theaters in its opening weekend. The film made $2.3 million on its first day, including $260,000 from Thursday night previews. It went on to debut in fifth place with $7.3 million. On its second weekend, the film fell 48% and made $3.7 million.

=== Critical response ===
Ron's Gone Wrong received generally positive reviews from critics. On the review aggregation website Rotten Tomatoes, the film holds an approval rating of 82%, based on 103 reviews, with an average rating of 6.7/10. The website's critical consensus reads: "It isn't the first animated film to confront technology creep, but in terms of striking an entertaining balance between humor and heart, Ron's Gone Wrong gets it right." On Metacritic, the film has a score of 65 out of 100 based on 23 critics, indicating "generally favourable reviews". Audiences polled by CinemaScore gave the film an average grade of "A" on an A+ to F scale.

James Mottram of The South China Morning Post wrote: "sweet, heart-warming and frighteningly prescient, Ron's Gone Wrong is one of the best animated films in recent memory". Tim Robey of The Daily Telegraph gave the film four out of five and said that the film is "visualised with verve" and that "it's a zingy and mercilessly funny satire on how devices, with their ever-so-friendly interfaces, have in fact become our despots". Ben Kenigsberg of The New York Times said "As family entertainment, it's fine." Peter Bradshaw of The Guardian gave the film three out of five, saying that the film was "entertaining, though composed with algorithmic precision", adding that "it winds up suspiciously neutral about whether kids really should abandon digital enslavement in favour of real-life human friends." Pat Padua of The Washington Post gave the film three out of four, writing that it "has plenty of slapstick and potty humor for kids. But adults will also be intrigued by its frequently scathing (albeit somewhat conflicted) critique of consumerism." Mark Kermode said that the film was "really good fun and a real surprise".

Anna Smith of Deadline Hollywood Daily wrote that the film was "one for all the family - just put your cellphones away first". Brandon Zachary of CBR wrote "What starts as a movie you'd expect to know every twist to transcends into something far more interesting." Charles Bramesco of The A.V. Club wrote: "As in the curiously similar The Mitchells vs. the Machines, the misadventures transmit a light-hearted commentary on the wonders and hazards of our screen-saturated culture." Wendy Ide of Screen International said that the film "transcends the familiarity of the story with deft writing, appealing animation and a big heart crammed into a small malfunctioning robot". Angie Han of The Hollywood Reporter wrote "What the animated feature lacks in daring imagination, it makes up for with endearing good humor, thoughtful cultural critique and one heck of a cute robot." Mark Kennedy of the Associated Press was more critical of the film, describing it as "a derivative tale about a middle schooler and his quirky computer sidekick" and writing that it "seems to want to preach we should all disconnect from our devices and restore human contact. But then what will the filmmakers do with all that adorable merch?" Michael Ordoña of The Los Angeles Times wrote that the film "dots its primer on friendship with chase scenes and warnings about Big Tech with only mixed success". Yolanda Machando of TheWrap wrote that the film "offers partially realized messaging about social media while populating the story with elementary sight gags, too many overused "fish out of water" tropes and attractive merchandise options".

=== Accolades ===
| Award | Year | Category | Recipient(s) | Result |
|---|---|---|---|---|
| VHS Awards | 2021 | Best Animated Film | Ron's Gone Wrong | Nominated |
| Indiana Film Journalists Association Awards | 2021 | Best Animated Feature | Ron's Gone Wrong | Nominated |
| Indiana Film Journalists Association Awards | 2021 | Best Vocal/Motion Capture Performance | Olivia Colman | Nominated |
| Indiana Film Journalists Association Awards | 2021 | Best Vocal/Motion Capture Performance | Zach Galifianakis | Nominated |
| 42nd London Film Critics' Circle Awards | 2021 | British/Irish Actress of the Year | Olivia Colman | Nominated |
| BFE Cut Above Awards | 2022 | Best Edited Single Animation | David Burrows, James Cooper and Sim Evan-Jones | Nominated |
| 49th Annie Awards | 2022 | Outstanding Achievement for Character Design in an Animated Feature Production | Julien Bizat | Nominated |
| 49th Annie Awards | 2022 | Outstanding Achievement for Production Design on an Animated Feature Production | Aurélien Predal, Till Nowak and Nathan Crowley | Nominated |
| British Animation Awards | 2022 | Best Writer | Peter Baynham and Sarah Smith | Nominated |
| British Animation Awards | 2022 | Best Design | Aurélien Predal, Nathan Crowley and Till Nowak | Nominated |
| British Animation Awards | 2022 | Best Long Form | Ron's Gone Wrong | Won |
