= Sarah Smith (director) =

English film director, producer and screenwriter

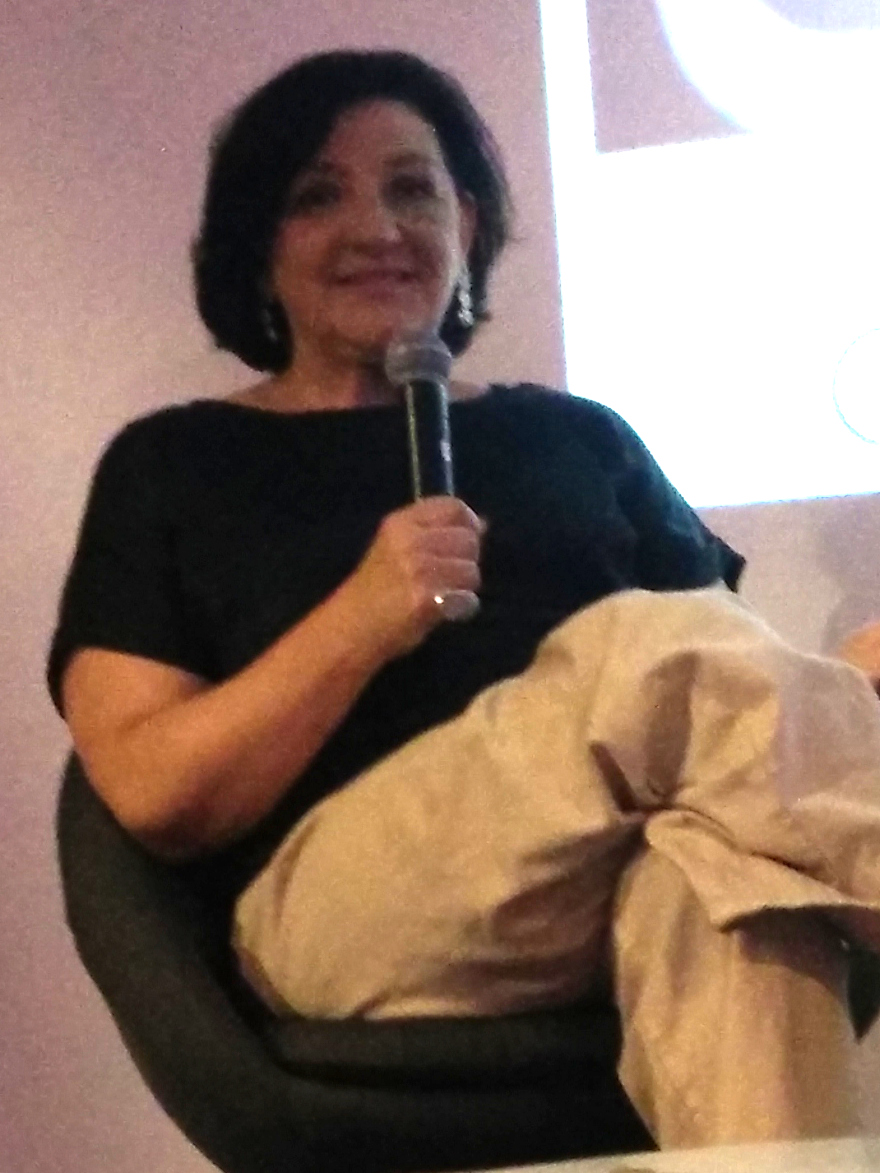
- Sarah Smith in 2023
- Born: Sarah Christine Smith; January 1966 (age 60); England
- Occupations: Film director; producer; screenwriter
- Years active: 1991-present

Sarah Christine Smith (born January 1966) is an English film director, producer, screenwriter, and the co-founder and former chief executive officer (CEO) of Locksmith Animation. She co-wrote and co-directed the animated films Arthur Christmas (2011) and Ron's Gone Wrong (2021).

Smith began her career in radio before serving as a television producer for live-action British comedy, including as writer for the Armistice news review shows. She later served various other assisting production roles in television, and as writer for the adult animated miniseries I Am Not an Animal. She then joined Aardman Animations as a creative director, going on to co-write and co-direct her first animated feature film Arthur Christmas. She eventually left the studio to run Locksmith Animation alongside co-founder and producer Julie Lockhart, where she eventually co-wrote, co-directed, and executive produced the film Ron's Gone Wrong.

== Career ==
Smith studied at the University of Oxford.

Smith met the comedy duo Lee and Herring and offered to produce a radio series. Their submission, Lionel Nimrod's Inexplicable World, was initially rejected for commission. However, Smith threatened to quit if the series was not accepted, an action Lee described as "heroic". The idea was resubmitted and accepted, and would eventually be recreated as Fist of Fun.

She became producer for the Armistice news review shows where she also served as writer. In 1997, Smith discussed her work on the UK general election special of Armistice. She explained there was an expansion of both news and comedy in media in years prior, and said "They've collided during the election so that all news programmes now apparently must have some comedy".

She became producer for the radio series The League of Gentlemen after discovering the comedy cast at Edinburgh Fringe in 1996, then as producer for the first series of its transfer to television that aired in 1999. Smith is regarded as an important figure in the creation of the series; BBC2 initially offered "a tiny budget", she successfully advocated for a larger budget of around £230,000 (GBP) for each half-hour episode to achieve high production values and cover on-location shooting in Hadfield, Derbyshire.

She became script consultant for the Brass Eye television special "Paedogeddon!", written and presented by Chris Morris. She was introduced to Morris to scrutinise his writing, and engaged in extended debates about comedy with respect to the topic matter of paedophilia, commenting "it was really important in that show that it did have a fundamental satirical intent".

She became writer for the adult animated miniseries I Am Not An Animal, marking her move towards the medium.

Smith was approached by Aardman Animations with a job offer to head their feature department; she had contacted Aardman in prior years with an interest in working on film scripts. Smith said she initially felt uncertain about accepting the role because she only had production experience overseeing live action comedy and drama. She joined the studio in 2006 expecting she would leave after six months, but stayed on determining she was there at an important time for picking up new projects, saying "[there was] an opportunity to take a whole fresh path and look at what they wanted to do as a company".

As a creative director at Aardman, she was the co-executive producer for the 2012 stop-motion animated film The Pirates! In an Adventure with Scientists! where she secured rights to adapt it from Gideon Defoe's The Pirates! book series. Smith wrote and directed her first animated feature film Arthur Christmas which was theatrically released in November 2011 by Columbia Pictures and Sony Pictures Releasing.

In 2012, Smith described her satisfaction with the Christmas lights display in London's Piccadilly Circus that promoted Arthur Christmas in the year prior, saying that it affirmed to her that it reached the general public. She also expressed disappointment over the film not being nominated for the Academy Award for Best Animated Feature when a film such as Puss in Boots did that year, remarking, "you've got to be kidding me".

Smith co-founded the animation studio Locksmith Animation in 2014 with Aardman executive Julie Lockhart and media executive businesswoman Elisabeth Murdoch. Smith wrote, directed and executive-produced Locksmith's first animated feature film Ron's Gone Wrong which was theatrically released by 20th Century Studios in October 2021. Smith left Locksmith in June 2021 and was replaced by Natalie Fischer as the studio's new CEO.
