= Flush! =

Children's book

- Author: Charise Mericle Harper
- Language: English
- Genre: children's literature
- Publisher: Little, Brown & Company
- Publication date: 7 March 2007
- Publication place: United States
- Media type: Print (Hardcover)
- Pages: 32
- ISBN: 978-0-316-01064-1
- OCLC: 60596112
- Dewey Decimal: 392.3/6 22
- LC Class: GT476 .H35 2007

Flush! is a 2007 non-fiction children's book written and illustrated by Charise Mericle Harper.

== Summary ==
The book contains two-page chapters with rhyming text, color illustration, and factual side-bars. Published for school children between grades 2 and 4, the book uses humor to describe the history of human waste. As well as the development of the toilet, chapters include various trivia including the uses of urine, Louis XIV's habit of holding meetings on a toilet that was shaped like a throne, and Elizabeth I's rejection of the first mechanical toilet.

== Reception ==
The book's reception has been mainly positive. In a review published on Booklist, Connie Fletcher said, "Harper's picture-book overview of the evolution of excrement disposal--from the invention of toilets 'over 10,000 years ago' to toilets in space--has everything some kids delight in: shock value, weird facts, and gross-out references. It's also a fascinating book, made cheerful by Harper's acrylic-and-collage illustrations." A Kirkus Reviews review says, "Young listeners plunging into this savory survey will come away with tasty new words like 'gongfermor' and 'garderobe,' plenty of eminently share-worthy facts . . . and sore cheeks--the facial sort--from laughing." Kitty Flynn of Horn Book Magazine said, "With their Kalman-esque color combinations, Harper’s engaging, idiosyncratic collage paintings help set the tone and, like the poems, manage to be both irreverent and edifying." The book's rhymes, however, were not appreciated by every critic; representative is a rhyme quoted and commented on in a review for the School Library Journal: "Unfortunately, the last poem offers a weak conclusion to the slightly more sophisticated bathroom humor of the previous rhymes: 'Let's do it all together./Not a whisper, give a shout:/POOPY! POOPY! POOPY!/is what this book's about!'"

== See also ==
- The Truth About Poop (book)
