= Rebecca Cobb =

English children's book writer and illustrator

- Born: Aylesbury, Buckinghamshire, England
- Education: Falmouth University
- Occupations: Children's book writer and illustrator
- Website: rebeccacobb.co.uk

Rebecca Cobb is an English children's book writer and illustrator who grew up in Buckinghamshire and Somerset and lives in Falmouth, Cornwall. After graduating Falmouth University, she worked with The Child Bereavement Charity, Continuum International Publishing Group, The Guardian, The Independent, Mabecron Books, Marion Boyars Publishers, Waitrose & Partners and You Magazine and she has collaborated with several authors such as Julia Donaldson, Nicola Davies, Mariesa Dulak, Katherine Woodfine, Richard Curtis and Helen Dunmore.

== Works ==
- Tongue Twisters to Tangle Your Tongue (2005)
- Missing Mummy: A Book About Bereavement (2011)
- The Paper Dolls (2012) (with Julia Donaldson)
- The Empty Stocking (2012) (with Richard Curtis)
- A table! (2012)
- Lunchtime (2012)
- Aunt Amelia (2013)
- Na caraidean (2013) (with Julia Donaldson)
- Snow Day (2014) (with Richard Curtis)
- The Something (2014)
- There's an Owl in My Towel (2016) (with Julia Donaldson)
- It's a Little Baby (2016) (with Julia Donaldson)
- The Everywhere Bear (2017) (with Julia Donaldson)
- The Day War Came (2018) (with Nicola Davies)
- Hello Friend! (2019)
- That Christmas (2020) (with Richard Curtis)
- Aunt Amelia's House (2021)
- Elisabeth and the Box of Colours (2022) (with Katherine Woodfine)
- Who Lives Here? With Lift-The-flap-fun! (2023) (with Julia Donaldson)
- There's a Tiger on the Train (2024) (with Mariesa Dulak)
- That Christmas and Other Stories: The Inspiration Behind the Hit Netflix Film (2024) (with Richard Curtis)
- A Wild Walk to School (2024)

== Awards and nominations ==
Year	Award	Category	Work	Result	Ref.
2013	The Waterstones Children's Book Prize	Best Picture Book	Lunchtime	Won	
2014	The Heart of Hawick Children’s Book Award	Best Picture Book	The Empty Stocking (with Richard Curtis)	Won	
2014	The Carnegie and Kate Greenaway Medal for Illustration	—N/a	The Paper Dolls (with Julia Donaldson)	Nominated	
2019	The Jane Addams Children's Book Award	—N/a	The Day War Came (with Nicola Davies)	Nominated	
