= List of directorial debuts =

This is a list of notable directors and their first commercial cinematic films, listed chronologically by release date.

Many of the listed filmmakers, including Orson Welles, directed earlier works that were not commercially released, such as film-school projects, movies that failed to find distribution, or others that were never intended for release. Beginning in the 1940s and 1950s, some directors learned their trade in the medium of television, including Robert Altman, Sidney Lumet, and Alfonso Cuarón. Later directors such as Alan Parker and Ridley Scott did their first professional work in commercial television advertising, which became more cinematic in the 1960s and 1970s. The success of MTV and the popularity of music videos from the early 1980s drew first work from David Fincher, Jonathan Glazer, Michel Gondry, and Spike Jonze.

♦ Indicates a director who created other earlier works for television.

# Indicates a director whose earlier work is uncredited.

† Indicates a director whose earlier work has not been released in cinemas—for example, film school productions, short films, or music videos.

== Pre–1876 ==
=== 1874 ===
- Pierre Janssen – Passage de Vénus

== 1876–1925 ==
=== 1878 ===
- Eadweard Muybridge – The Horse in Motion

=== 1887 ===
- Louis Le Prince – Man Walking Around a Corner

=== 1889 ===
- William Kennedy Dickson – Monkeyshines
- William Friese-Greene – Leisurely Pedestrians, Open Topped Buses and Hansom Cabs with Trotting Horses

=== 1892 ===
- Émile Reynaud – Un bon bock

=== 1894 ===
- Alexander Black – Miss Jerry

=== 1896 ===
- Alice Guy-Blaché – La Fée aux Choux
- Georges Méliès – Le Manoir du diable

=== 1898 ===
- Edwin S. Porter – The Cavalier's Dream

=== 1901 ===
- Segundo de Chomón – Bajada de Montserrat

=== 1907 ===
- Sidney Olcott – The Wooing of Miles Standish

=== 1908 ===
- Louis Feuillade – L'Homme aimanté
- D. W. Griffith – The Adventures of Dollie

=== 1909 ===
- Mack Sennett – The Curtain Pole

=== 1911 ===
- Oscar Apfel – The Wedding Bell
- Thomas H. Ince – Artful Kate
- Lois Weber – A Heroine of 76

=== 1912 ===
- Herbert Brenon – All for Her
- Christy Cabanne – Life of Villa
- Michael Curtiz – Utolsó bohém, Az
- Francis Ford – The Post Telegrapher
- J. Farrell MacDonald – The Worth of a Man
- Wallace Reid – The Tribal Law
- Victor Sjöström – Ett hemligt giftermål
- Maurice Tourneur – Jean la Poudre
- Robert Wiene – Die Waffen der Jugend

=== 1913 ===
- Wallace Beery – Kitty's Knight
- Frank Borzage – The Mystery of Yellow Aster Mine
- Hobart Bosworth – The Sea Wolf
- Jack Conway† – The Old Armchair
- Carmine Gallone – Il bacio di Cirano
- Dadasaheb Phalke – Raja Harishchandra
- King Vidor – Hurricane in Galveston
- Raoul Walsh – The Pseudo Prodigal

=== 1914 ===
- Donald Crisp – Her Father's Silent Partner
- Cecil B. DeMille – The Squaw Man
- Allan Dwan – The Unwelcome Mrs. Hatch
- William S. Hart – The Gringo
- Rex Ingram – The Symphony of Souls
- George Irving – The Jungle
- Alexander Korda – Orhaz a Karpatokban
- Robert Z. Leonard – The Master Key
- Frank Lloyd – The Law of His Kind
- John M. Stahl – A Boy and the Law
- William Desmond Taylor – The Smouldering Spark

=== 1915 ===
- Roscoe Arbuckle – Mabel and Fatty Viewing the World's Fair at San Francisco
- Richard Boleslavsky – Ty yeshcho ne umesh lyubit
- Charles Brabin – Vanity Fair
- Tod Browning – The Lucky Transfer
- Lon Chaney – The Stool Pigeon
- Harry Davenport – The Island of Regeneration
- Alan Hale – The Passing Storm
- Frank Reicher – The Clue
- Hal Roach – Willie Runs the Park
- William A. Seiter – The Honeymoon Roll

=== 1916 ===
- Francis X. Bushman – In the Diplomatic Service
- Alfred E. Green – The Temptation of Adam
- Oliver Hardy – Bungles Lands a Job
- Rex Ingram – The Great Problem
- Rupert Julian – Naked Hearts
- Ernst Lubitsch – Shoe Palace Pinkus
- George Marshall – Love's Lariat
- Fred Niblo – Get-Rich-Quick Wallingford

=== 1917 ===
- John Ford – The Tornado
- Lambert Hillyer – An Even Break
- Harold Lloyd – Over the Fence
- Roy William Neill – The Girl, Glory
- John S. Robertson – Baby Mine
- Wesley Ruggles – For France
- W. S. Van Dyke – The Land of Long Shadows

=== 1918 ===
- James Cruze – Too Many Millions
- Douglas Fairbanks – Arizona
- Dave Fleischer – Out of the Inkwell
- Howard C. Hickman – The White Lie
- Zoltan Korda – Károly bakák
- Wallace Worsley – An Alien Enemy

=== 1919 ===
- Carl Theodor Dreyer – The President
- Victor Fleming – When the Clouds Roll By
- Max Fleischer – The Tantalizing Fly
- Fritz Lang – Halbblut
- Oscar Micheaux – The Homesteader
- F. W. Murnau – The Boy in Blue
- Gustav von Seyffertitz – The Secret Garden
- Erich von Stroheim – Blind Husbands

=== 1920 ===
- Clarence Brown – The Great Redeemer
- Erle C. Kenton – Down on the Farm
- Reinhold Schünzel – Der Graf von Cagliostro
- Edward Sedgwick – Fantomas
- William A. Wellman – The Twins of Suffering Creek
- Sam Wood – Double Speed

=== 1921 ===
- Gregory La Cava – His Nibs
- Charlie Chaplin – The Kid
- John Gilbert – Love's Penalty
- Harry Houdini – The Soul of Bronze
- William K. Howard – Get Your Man
- Grover Jones – The Unknown
- Rowland V. Lee – Blind Hearts
- Edward Ludwig – Rip Van Winkle
- Leo McCarey – Society Secrets
- Albert S. Rogell – The Ranch Mystery

=== 1922 ===
- Frank Capra – Fultah Fisher's Boarding House
- Irving Cummings – The Man from Hell's River
- Robert J. Flaherty – Nanook of the North
- Alexander Hall – A Game of Craft
- Rupert Hughes – The Wall Flower
- Frank Tuttle – The Cradle Buster

=== 1923 ===
- Adrian Brunel – The Man Without Desire
- William Dieterle – Der Mensch am Wege
- Sessue Hayakawa – La Bataille
- Seymour Hicks – Always Tell Your Wife
- Julio Irigoyen – De Nuestras Pampas
- Buster Keaton – Three Ages
- Kenji Mizoguchi – Ai ni yomigaru hi
- Dudley Murphy – High Speed Lee
- Berthold Viertel – Nana

=== 1924 ===
- Tay Garnett – Fast Break
- Grigori Kozintsev and Leonid Trauberg – The Adventures of Oktyabrina
- Jean Renoir – Backbiters

=== 1925 ===
- Clyde Bruckman – Cowboys Cry for It
- Jean Cocteau – Jean Cocteau fait du Cinema
- Roy Del Ruth† – Eve's Lover
- Sergei Eisenstein† – Strike
- Edmund Goulding – Sun-Up
- Alfred Hitchcock – The Pleasure Garden
- Walter Lang – The Red Kimono
- Stan Laurel – Chasing the Chaser
- Lewis Milestone† – Seven Sinners
- Paul Sloane – Too Many Kisses
- Josef von Sternberg – The Salvation Hunters
- A. Edward Sutherland – Coming Through
- Herbert Wilcox – Chu-Chin-Chow

== 1926–1975 ==
=== 1926 ===
- Howard Hawks – The Road to Glory
- Miles Mander – The Whistler
- Archie Mayo† – Money Talks
- Ray Taylor – Fighting with Buffalo Bill
- Edgar G. Ulmer# – The Border Sheriff (Note: Co-directed with Robert N. Bradbury)
- William Wyler† – Lazy Lightning

=== 1927 ===
- Anthony Asquith – Shooting Stars
- Lloyd Bacon – The Heart of Maryland
- David Butler – High School Hero
- Robert Florey – One Hour of Love
- Mervyn LeRoy – No Place to Go
- Yasujirō Ozu – Zange no Yaiba

=== 1928 ===
- Norman Z. McLeod – Taking a Chance
- Alfred L. Werker – The Pioneer Scout
- Tim Whelan – Adam's Apple

=== 1929 ===
- Lionel Barrymore – Madame X
- John Cromwell – Close Harmony
- Dorothy Davenport – Linda
- Martin Frič – Father Vojtech
- Rouben Mamoulian – Applause
- Andrew Marton – Two O'Clock in the Morning
- Robert Milton – The Dummy
- Elliott Nugent# – Wise Girls
- Edgar Selwyn – The Girl in the Show
- Alf Sjöberg – Den starkaste
- Norman Taurog – Lucky Boy

=== 1930 ===
- Luis Buñuel† – L'Age d'Or
- Lloyd Corrigan – Follow Thru
- George Cukor – Grumpy
- Howard Hughes – Hell's Angels
- Sidney Lanfield – Cheer Up and Smile
- Ray McCarey – Two Plus Fours
- Lowell Sherman† – Lawful Larceny
- Robert Siodmak – People on Sunday
- Jean Vigo – À propos de Nice
- James Whale – Journey's End

=== 1931 ===
- Peter Godfrey – Down River
- Michael Powell – Two Crowded Hours
- Otto Preminger – The Great Love
- Jacques Tourneur – Tout ça ne vaut pas l'amour
- Stuart Walker – The Secret Call

=== 1932 ===
- Thorold Dickinson – The First Mrs. Fraser
- Karl Freund – The Mummy
- Henry Hathaway – Heritage of the Desert
- William Keighley – The Match King
- Henry Koster – Thea Roland
- Edwin L. Marin – The Death Kiss
- Irving Pichel – The Most Dangerous Game
- John Rawlins – High Society
- Herbert Selpin – Chauffeur Antoinette
- Robert Stevenson – Happy Ever After

=== 1933 ===
- Busby Berkeley – She Had to Say Yes
- Fei Mu – Night in the City
- Mitchell Leisen – Cradle Song
- Marcel Pagnol† – Le gendre de Monsieur Poirier
- George Stevens† – A Divorce Courtship
- Charles Vidor – Sensation Hunters
- Bernard Vorhaus – The Ghost Camera

=== 1934 ===
- Charles Barton – Wagon Wheels
- Cedric Gibbons – Tarzan and His Mate
- Brian Desmond Hurst – The Tell-Tale Heart
- John Farrow – The Spectacle Maker
- Arthur Lubin – A Successful Failure
- Mario Mattoli – Tempo Massimo
- Alice O'Fredericks – Ud i den kolde sne
- Billy Wilder – Mauvaise Graine
- Harold Young – Leave It to Blanche

=== 1935 ===
- Edward Dmytryk – The Hawk
- W. C. Fields# – Man on the Flying Trapeze
- James W. Horne – Bonnie Scotland
- Mehboob Khan – Judgement of Allah
- Yuan Muzhi – Scenes of City Life
- Carol Reed – It Happened in Paris
- Douglas Sirk – The Girl from the Marsh Croft
- Jacques Tati – Gai dimanche

=== 1936 ===
- Lew Ayres – Hearts in Bondage
- John Brahm† – Broken Blossoms
- William Clemens – Man Hunt
- Norman Foster – I Cover Chinatown
- Stuart Heisler – Straight from the Shoulder
- Buck Jones – For the Service
- Gregory Ratoff – Sins of Man
- Wells Root – The Bold Caballero

=== 1937 ===
- Vijay Bhatt – Khwab Ki Duniya
- William Cottrell, David Hand, Larry Morey, and Perce Pearce – Snow White and the Seven Dwarfs
- Giacomo Gentilomo – Sinfonia di Roma
- Roy Kellino – Concerning Mr. Martin
- Julio Saraceni – Noches de carnaval
- Harold D. Schuster – Wings of the Morning
- S. Sylvan Simon – A Girl with Ideas
- William Witney – The Painted Stallion

=== 1938 ===
- Leslie Howard – Pygmalion
- Erich Pommer – Vessel of Wrath
- George Waggner – Western Trails
- Mario Zampi – 13 Men and a Gun

=== 1939 ===
- Ricardo Cortez – Inside Story
- Harold Huth – Hell's Cargo
- Joseph Losey – Pete Roleum and his Cousins
- Leslie Norman – Too Dangerous to Live (Note: Co-directed with Anthony Hankey)
- Vincent Sherman – The Return of Doctor X

=== 1940 ===
- James Algar, Samuel Armstrong, Bill Roberts, Paul Satterfield, Jim Handley, Ford Beebe Jr., T. Hee, Norman Ferguson, and Wilfred Jackson – Fantasia (Note: Co-directed with Hamilton Luske, Ben Sharpsteen, and David D. Hand)
- Joseph Barbera and William Hanna – Puss Gets the Boot
- Hamilton Luske and Ben Sharpsteen – Pinocchio
- William Morgan – Bowery Boy
- Vittorio De Sica – Rose scarlatte
- Preston Sturges – The Great McGinty

=== 1941 ===
- Jules Dassin – The Tell-Tale Heart
- John Huston – The Maltese Falcon
- Jean Negulesco – Singapore Woman
- Irving Rapper – Shining Victory
- George Sidney† – Free and Easy
- Ted Tetzlaff – World Premiere
- Orson Welles† – Citizen Kane
- Spencer Williams – The Blood of Jesus

=== 1942 ===
- Henri-Georges Clouzot – The Murderer Lives at Number 21
- Noël Coward and David Lean – In Which We Serve
- Basil Dearden and Will Hay – The Black Sheep of Whitehall
- Michael Gordon – Boston Blackie Goes Hollywood
- Will Hay – The Black Sheep of Whitehall
- Charles Lederer – Fingers at the Window
- Albert Lewin – The Moon and Sixpence
- Anthony Mann♦ – Dr. Broadway
- Joseph M. Newman – Northwest Rangers
- Manoel de Oliveira – Aniki-Bóbó
- Emeric Pressburger – One of Our Aircraft Is Missing

=== 1943 ===
- Robert Bresson – Angels of the Streets
- William Castle – Klondike Kate
- Delmer Daves – Destination Tokyo
- Maya Deren – Meshes of the Afternoon
- Akira Kurosawa – Sanshiro Sugata
- Frank Launder – Millions Like Us
- Roy Rowland†# – A Stranger in Town
- Vincente Minnelli# – Cabin in the Sky
- Dudley Nichols – Government Girl
- Roberto Rossellini – Le Nave Biance
- Luchino Visconti – Ossessione
- Fred M. Wilcox – Lassie Come Home

=== 1944 ===
- René Clément† – Paris sous la botte
- Charles Crichton – For Those in Peril
- Lewis Gilbert – Sailors Do Care
- James V. Kern – The Doughgirls
- Clifford Odets – None But the Lonely Heart
- Laurence Olivier – Henry V
- Helmut Weiss – The Punch Bowl
- Robert Wise – The Curse of the Cat People (Note: Co-directed with Gunther von Fritsch)

=== 1945 ===
- K. Asif – Phool
- Mel Ferrer – The Girl of the Limberlost
- Phillip Ford – The Tiger Woman
- Elia Kazan† – A Tree Grows in Brooklyn
- George Seaton – Diamond Horseshoe
- Don Siegel – Star in the Night
- William C. Thomas – Midnight Manhunt
- Hal Walker – Out of This World

=== 1946 ===
- Khwaja Ahmad Abbas – Dharti Ke Lal
- Chetan Anand – Neecha Nagar
- Ingmar Bergman – Crisis
- John Berry – Miss Susie Slagle's
- Richard Fleischer† – Child of Divorce
- Robert Hamer# – Pink String and Sealing Wax
- Clyde Geronimi, Jack Kinney, Joshua Meador, and Bob Cormack – Make Mine Music
- Joseph L. Mankiewicz – Dragonwyck
- William D. Russell† – Our Hearts Were Growing Up
- John Sturges – The Man Who Dared
- Peter Ustinov – School for Secrets
- Charles Walters – Ziegfeld Follies
- Terence Young – Theirs Is the Glory (Note: Co-directed with Brian Desmond Hurst)

=== 1947 ===
- Robert Alton – Merton of the Movies
- Ken Annakin† – Holiday Camp
- Roy Ward Baker – The October Man
- Martin Gabel – The Lost Moment
- Kon Ichikawa – A Thousand and One Nights with Toho
- Rudolph Maté and Don Hartman – It Had to Be You
- Robert Montgomery – Lady in the Lake
- Robert Rossen – Johnny O'Clock
- Derek N. Twist – The End of the River

=== 1948 ===
- László Benedek# – The Kissing Bandit
- Terence Fisher – A Song for Tomorrow
- Jack Gage – The Velvet Touch
- Raj Kapoor – Aag
- Richard Quine – Leather Gloves
- Nicholas Ray – They Live by Night
- Bretaigne Windust – Winter Meeting

=== 1949 ===
- Stanley Donen and Gene Kelly – On the Town
- Sam Fuller – I Shot Jesse James
- John Guillermin – High Jinks in Society (Note: Co-directed with Robert Jordan Hill)
- Ida Lupino – Never Fear
- Alexander Mackendrick – Whisky Galore!
- Jean-Pierre Melville† – Le Silence de la Mer
- Arne Skouen – Gategutter
- Emlyn Williams – The Last Days of Dolwyn

=== 1950 ===
- Michelangelo Antonioni† – Cronaca di un amore
- Richard Brooks – Crisis
- Youssef Chahine – Baba Amin
- Adolfo Celi – Caiçara
- Federico Fellini – Variety Lights
- Burgess Meredith – The Man on the Eiffel Tower
- Joseph Pevney – Shakedown
- J. Lee Thompson – Murder Without Crime
- Atif Yilmaz – Kanli Feryat

=== 1951 ===
- Guru Dutt – Baazi
- Harold F. Kress† – The Painted Hills
- Peter Lorre – The Lost One
- Christian Nyby – The Thing from Another World
- Robert Parrish – Cry Danger
- Russell Rouse – The Well
- Kaneto Shindo – Story of a Beloved Wife
- Charles Marquis Warren – Little Big Horn

=== 1952 ===
- Ritwik Ghatak – Chinnamul
- Guy Hamilton – The Ringer
- Paul Henreid – For Men Only
- Harry Horner – Red Planet Mars
- Ken Hughes – Wide Boy
- Nathan H. Juran – The Black Castle
- Jerzy Kawalerowicz – Gromada
- Masaki Kobayashi – My Son's Youth
- Noel Langley – The Pickwick Papers
- Arnold Laven – Without Warning!
- Chris Marker – Olympia 52
- Frank Tashlin† – The First Time

=== 1953 ===
- Robert Aldrich♦ – Big Leaguer
- Jack Arnold – Girls in the Night
- Peter Brook – The Beggar's Opera
- Don Chaffey – Skid Kids
- Jesse Hibbs† – The All American
- Eugène Lourié – The Beast from 20,000 Fathoms
- Phil Tucker – Robot Monster
- Stanley Kubrick† – Fear and Desire
- Francis D. Lyon♦ – Crazylegs
- Dick Powell – Split Second
- Ed Wood – Glen or Glenda

=== 1954 ===
- Abner Biberman – The Golden Mistress
- James Wong Howe† – Go, Man, Go!
- Nunnally Johnson – Night People
- Edmond O'Brien and Howard W. Koch – Shield for Murder
- Richard Carlson – Riders to the Stars
- Dennis O'Keefe – The Diamond
- Herbert L. Strock# – Gog
- Sergei Parajanov† – Andriesh (Note: Co-directed with Yakov Bazelyan)
- Yves Robert – Les hommes ne pensent qu'à ça
- Tapan Sinha – Ankush
- Agnès Varda – La Pointe Courte

=== 1955 ===
- Hall Bartlett – Unchained
- Earl Bellamy♦ – Seminole Uprising
- Roger Corman – Five Guns West
- Hubert Cornfield† – Sudden Danger
- Blake Edwards – Bring Your Smile Along
- José Ferrer – The Cockleshell Heroes
- Bert I. Gordon – King Dinosaur
- Stanley Kramer – Not as a Stranger
- Charles Laughton – The Night of the Hunter
- Burt Lancaster – The Kentuckian
- Delbert Mann – Marty
- Ray Milland – A Man Alone
- Satyajit Ray – Pather Panchali
- Mrinal Sen – Raat Bhore
- Don Sharp – The Stolen Airliner
- Melville Shavelson – The Seven Little Foys
- Andrzej Wajda – A Generation
- Cornel Wilde – Storm Fear

=== 1956 ===
- Joseph Anthony – The Rainmaker
- Valentine Davies – The Benny Goodman Story
- Leonid Gaidai – A Weary Road
- Charles F. Haas♦ – Star in the Dust
- Andrew V. McLaglen – Man in the Vault
- Claude Sautet – Bonjour Sourire!
- Alex Segal♦ – Ransom!
- Seijun Suzuki – Minato no kanpai: Shôri o waga te ni
- Daniel Taradash – Storm Center
- Samuel A. Taylor – The Monte Carlo Story

=== 1957 ===
- Robert Altman†♦ – The Delinquents
- James B. Clark♦ – Under Fire
- Clive Donner – The Secret Place
- Anselmo Duarte – Absolutamente Certo
- Gene Fowler Jr. – I Was a Teenage Werewolf
- John Frankenheimer♦ – The Young Stranger
- Sidney Lumet♦ – 12 Angry Men
- Robert Mulligan♦ – Fear Strikes Out
- Art Napoleon – Man on the Prowl
- Martin Ritt – Edge of the City
- Franco Zeffirelli – Camping

=== 1958 ===
- Gabriel Axel♦ – The Girls Are Willing
- Jack Cardiff† – Intent to Kill
- Claude Chabrol – Le Beau Serge
- Herschel Daugherty♦ – The Light in the Forest
- Michel Deville – Une balle dans le canon
- Wojciech Has† – Petla
- Shōhei Imamura – Stolen Desire
- Miklós Jancsó – The Bells Have Gone to Rome
- Irvin Kershner – Stakeout on Dope Street
- Louis Malle – Elevator to the Gallows
- José Mojica Marins – Adventurer's Fate
- George Pal – Tom Thumb
- Quentin Lawrence – The Trollenberg Terror
- Arthur Penn♦ – The Left Handed Gun
- Anthony Quinn – The Buccaneer
- Karel Reisz – We Are the Lambeth Boys
- Bernhard Wicki – Warum Sind Sie Gegen Uns?

=== 1959 ===
- John Cassavetes – Shadows
- Yash Chopra – Dhool Ka Phool
- Les Clark, Eric Larson, and Wolfgang Reitherman – Sleeping Beauty
- Jack Clayton† – Room at the Top
- Georges Franju† – Head Against the Wall
- Sidney J. Furie – A Dangerous Age
- Monte Hellman – Beast from Haunted Cave
- Ray Kellogg – The Killer Shrews
- Elen Klimov – Ostorzhno: poshlost
- Nagisa Oshima – A Town of Love and Hope
- Joel Rapp – High School Big Shot
- Alain Resnais – Hiroshima, Mon Amour
- Tony Richardson♦ – Look Back in Anger
- Éric Rohmer† – Le Signe du lion
- François Truffaut – The 400 Blows

=== 1960 ===
- Mario Bava – Black Sunday
- Jean-Luc Godard† – À bout de souffle
- Herbert J. Leder – Pretty Boy Floyd
- Jerry Lewis – The Bellboy
- Walter Matthau – Gangster Story
- Jacques Rivette – Paris Belongs to Us
- Stuart Rosenberg♦ – Murder, Inc.
- Masahiro Shinoda – One-Way Ticket for Love
- John Wayne – The Alamo
- Mel Welles – Code of Silence
- Michael Winner – Shoot to Kill
- Yoji Yamada – Zero no shôten
- Yoshishige Yoshida – Rokudenashi

=== 1961 ===
- Luis Alcoriza – Los jóvenes
- William Alland – Look in Any Window
- Marlon Brando – One-Eyed Jacks
- Jack Couffer – Nikki, Wild Dog of the North
- Tad Danielewski – The Big Wave
- Jacques Demy† – Lola
- Richard Donner♦ – X-15
- Bryan Forbes – Whistle Down the Wind
- Kinji Fukasaku – Hakuchu no buraikan
- Greg Garrison♦ – Hey, Let's Twist!
- Susumu Hani† – Bad Boys
- Andrei Konchalovsky – The Boy and the Pigeon
- Buzz Kulik♦ – The Explosive Generation
- Claude Lelouch – Le propre de l'homme
- Sergio Leone# – The Colossus of Rhodes
- Pier Paolo Pasolini – Accattone
- Halit Refiğ† – Yasak Aşk
- Don Taylor – Everything's Ducky

=== 1962 ===
- Bernardo Bertolucci – La commare secca
- Alain Cavalier – Le combat dans l'île
- George Roy Hill – Period of Adjustment
- Arthur Hiller♦ – This Rugged Land
- Norman Jewison♦ – 40 Pounds of Trouble
- Richard Lester†♦ – It's Trad, Dad!
- Abe Levitow – Gay Purr-ee
- Frank Perry – David and Lisa
- Roman Polanski† – Knife in the Water
- Gerald Potterton – My Financial Career
- Richard C. Sarafian – Terror at Black Falls
- John Schlesinger – A Kind of Loving
- Vilgot Sjöman – The Mistress
- Andrei Tarkovsky – Ivan's Childhood
- Hiroshi Teshigahara – Pitfall

=== 1963 ===
- Lindsay Anderson – This Sporting Life
- Gower Champion♦ – My Six Loves
- Francis Ford Coppola†# – Dementia 13
- George Englund♦ – The Ugly American
- Forugh Farrokhzad – The House Is Black
- James Ivory – The Householder
- Jack O'Connell – Greenwich Village Story
- Ken Russell†♦ – French Dressing
- Franklin J. Schaffner♦ – The Stripper
- Peter Tewksbury♦ – Sunday in New York
- Peter Yates – Summer Holiday
- Bud Yorkin – Come Blow Your Horn

=== 1964 ===
- Jack Curtis – The Flesh Eaters
- Miloš Forman† – Black Peter
- Samuel Goldwyn Jr. – The Young Lovers
- Philip Kaufman – Goldstein
- Elem Klimov – Welcome, or No Trespassing
- Manfred R. Köhler – Coffin from Hong Kong
- Larry Peerce – One Potato, Two Potato
- Glauber Rocha† – Black God, White Devil
- Ettore Scola† – Se permettete parliamo di donne
- Mel Stuart♦ – Four Days in November

=== 1965 ===
- Stephen C. Apostolof – Orgy of the Dead
- Bruno Bozzetto – West and Soda
- John Boorman♦ – Catch Us If You Can
- Steve Cochran – Tell Me in the Sunlight
- Fred Coe♦ – A Thousand Clowns
- John Derek – Nightmare in the Sun
- Costa-Gavras – The Sleeping Car Murders
- Ebrahim Golestan† – Brick and Mirror
- Daniel Haller – Die, Monster, Die!
- Dušan Makavejev† – Covek nije tica
- Ernest Pintoff† – Harvey Middleman, Fireman
- Sydney Pollack♦ – The Slender Thread
- Arthur Rankin Jr. – Willy McBean and His Magic Machine
- David Secter – Winter Kept Us Warm
- Elliot Silverstein – Cat Ballou
- Frank Sinatra – None but the Brave
- Jerzy Skolimowski♦ – Walkover
- Robert Sparr♦ – A Swingin' Summer
- István Szabó – Age of Illusions
- Jan Troell – 4x4
- K. Viswanath – Aatma Gowravam

=== 1966 ===
- Woody Allen – What's Up, Tiger Lily?
- Hy Averback♦ – Chamber of Horrors
- Jules Bass – The Daydreamer
- Paul Bogart♦ – The Three Sisters
- Bob Clark – The Emperor's New Clothes
- Jim Clark – The Christmas Tree
- Marguerite Duras – La musica
- Rainer Werner Fassbinder – Der Stadtstreicher
- Yasuharu Hasebe – Black Tight Killers
- William Klein – Who Are You, Polly Maggoo?
- Alexander Kluge – Yesterday Girl
- David Lane♦ – Thunderbirds Are Go
- Mariano Laurenti – Il vostro super agente Flit
- Darius Mehrjui – Diamond 33
- Mickey Moore – Paradise, Hawaiian Style
- Mike Nichols – Who's Afraid of Virginia Woolf?
- Lucian Pintilie – Sunday at Six
- Ousmane Sembene – Borom Sarret
- Volker Schlöndorff† – Der Junge Törless

=== 1967 ===
- Albert Finney – Charlie Bubbles
- William Friedkin♦ – Good Times
- Toshiya Fujita – Hikō shōnen: Hinode no sakebi
- Philippe Garrel† – Marie for Memory
- David Greene♦ – The Shuttered Room
- Anthony Harvey♦ – Dutchman
- Med Hondo – Soleil O
- Manoj Kumar – Upkar
- Ken Loach♦ – Poor Cow
- Howard Morris – Who's Minding the Mint?
- Melvin Van Peebles – The Story of a Three-Day Pass
- Carl Reiner – Enter Laughing
- Mark Rydell – The Fox
- Martin Scorsese – Who's That Knocking at My Door
- Michael Verhoeven – The Dance of Death

=== 1968 ===
- Kevin Billington♦ – Interlude
- Noel Black†♦ – Pretty Poison
- Peter Bogdanovich♦ – Voyage to the Planet of Prehistoric Women
- Mel Brooks – The Producers
- Jacques Charon – A Flea in Her Ear
- George Dunning – Yellow Submarine
- James Goldstone – A Man Called Gannon
- Werner Herzog† – Signs of Life
- Alejandro Jodorowsky† – Fando y Lis
- Norman Mailer – Wild 90
- Peter Medak – Negatives
- Paul Newman – Rachel, Rachel
- Brian De Palma† – Murder a la Mod
- Bob Rafelson – Head
- George A. Romero† – Night of the Living Dead
- Raúl Ruiz† – Three Sad Tigers
- Joseph Sargent† – The Hell with Heroes
- Fernando Solanas† – The Hour of the Furnaces
- Isao Takahata – Hols: Prince of the Sun
- Eric Till – Hot Millions

=== 1969 ===
- Roy Andersson† – Lördagen den 5.10
- Richard Attenborough – Oh! What a Lovely War
- Robert Alan Aurthur – The Lost Man
- John G. Avildsen† – Turn on to Love
- David Cronenberg† – Stereo
- Bob Fosse – Sweet Charity
- Piers Haggard♦ – I Can't... I Can't
- Tobe Hooper† – Eggshells
- Dennis Hopper – Easy Rider
- Peter R. Hunt – On Her Majesty's Secret Service
- Lee H. Katzin – Heaven with a Gun
- Charles Jarrott♦ – Anne of the Thousand Days
- Paul Mazursky – Bob & Carol & Ted & Alice
- Bill Melendez – A Boy Named Charlie Brown
- Anthony Newley – Can Heironymus Merkin Ever Forget Mercy Humppe and Find True Happiness?
- Alan J. Pakula – The Sterile Cuckoo
- Gordon Parks† – The Learning Tree
- Barney Platts-Mills† – Bronco Bullfrog
- Michael Ritchie – Downhill Racer
- Herbert Ross – Goodbye, Mr. Chips
- Arthur Allan Seidelman – Hercules in New York
- Paul Williams† – Out of It

=== 1970 ===
- Theodoros Angelopoulos – Reconstitution
- Dario Argento – The Bird with the Crystal Plumage
- Hal Ashby – The Landlord
- Rajinder Singh Bedi – Dastak
- James Bridges – The Baby Maker
- Lino Brocka – Wanted: Perfect Mother
- Gilbert Cates♦ – I Never Sang for My Father
- Richard A. Colla† – Zigzag
- George P. Cosmatos – The Beloved
- Sean S. Cunningham – The Art of Marriage
- Ossie Davis – Cotton Comes to Harlem
- William A. Fraker – Monte Walsh
- Alan Gibson♦ – Crescendo
- Lionel Jeffries – The Railway Children
- Chuck Jones – The Phantom Tollbooth (Note: Co-directed with Abe Levitow)
- Leonard Kastle – The Honeymoon Killers
- Barbara Loden – Wanda
- Vic Morrow♦ – A Man Called Sledge
- Nicolas Roeg and Donald Cammell – Performance
- Robert Scheerer♦ – Adam at 6 A.M.
- Wim Wenders – Summer in the City

=== 1971 ===
- Alan Arkin† – Little Murders
- George P. Cosmatos – Sin
- Clint Eastwood – Play Misty for Me
- John Erman♦ – Making It
- Peter Fonda – The Hired Hand
- James Frawley♦ – The Christian Licorice Store
- Stephen Frears – Gumshoe
- John D. Hancock – Let's Scare Jessica to Death
- Mike Hodges♦ – Get Carter
- Mike Leigh – Bleak Moments
- Jack Lemmon – Kotch
- George Lucas† – THX 1138
- Elaine May – A New Leaf
- Russ Mayberry♦ – The Jesus Trip
- Jack Nicholson – Drive, He Said
- Stewart Raffill – The Tender Warrior
- Ivan Reitman† – Foxy Lady
- Steven Spielberg – Duel
- Steven Hilliard Stern – B.S. I Love You
- Dalton Trumbo – Johnny Got His Gun
- Lawrence Turman – The Marriage of a Young Stockbroker
- Paul Verhoeven – Business Is Business
- Peter Weir†♦ – Homesdale
- Chatrichalerm Yugala – Out of the Darkness
- Claude Zidi – Les Bidasses en folie

=== 1972 ===
- Chantal Akerman† – Hôtel Monterey
- Michael Apted♦ – The Triple Echo
- Ralph Bakshi†♦ – Fritz the Cat
- Paul Bartel† – Private Parts
- Bruce Beresford – The Adventures of Barry McKenzie
- Robert Benton – Bad Company
- Larry Cohen – Bone
- Jackie Cooper♦ – Stand Up and Be Counted
- Wes Craven – The Last House on the Left
- Bill Douglas† – My Childhood
- Daryl Duke♦ – Payday
- Adoor Gopalakrishnan† – Swayamvaram
- Larry Hagman♦ – Beware! The Blob
- David Hemmings – Running Scared
- Perry Henzel – The Harder They Come
- Charlton Heston – Antony and Cleopatra
- Bruce Lee – The Way of the Dragon
- Djibril Diop Mambéty – Touki Bouki
- Gary Nelson♦ – Molly and Lawless John
- Gordon Parks Jr. – Super Fly
- Arnold Perl – Malcolm X
- Lee Philips – Getting Away from It All
- Sidney Poitier – Buck and the Preacher
- Michael Schultz♦ – Together for Days
- George C. Scott – Rage
- Kumar Shahani – Maya Darpan
- John Waters – Pink Flamingos
- Clyde Ware – No Drums, No Bugles

=== 1973 ===
- Hector Babenco – O Fabuloso Fittipaldi
- Shyam Benegal♦ – Ankur
- Ricou Browning♦ – Salty
- Martin Campbell – The Sex Thief
- Georg Fenady – Terror in the Wax Museum
- Joe D'Amato# – Death Smiles on a Murderer
- Philip D'Antoni – The Seven-Ups
- William Dear† – Nymph
- Kirk Douglas – Scalawag
- Charles K. Eastman – The All-American Boy
- Haile Gerima† – Child of Resistance
- Curtis Hanson – Sweet Kill
- Robin Hardy – The Wicker Man
- Anna Karina – Vivre ensemble
- Abbas Kiarostami† – The Experience
- John Landis – Schlock
- Mark L. Lester – Steel Arena
- Terrence Malick† – Badlands
- John Milius† – Dillinger
- Charles August Nichols and Iwao Takamoto – Charlotte's Web
- Sohrab Shahid-Saless♦ – A Simple Event
- Jeannot Szwarc♦ – Extreme Close-Up
- John Woo – Fist to Fist
- Howard Zieff – Slither

=== 1974 ===
- Paul Annett♦ – The Beast Must Die
- G. Aravindan – Uttarayanam
- Arizal♦ – Senyum dan Tangis
- John Byrum – Inserts
- Joe Camp – Benji
- John Carpenter – Dark Star
- Michael Cimino – Thunderbolt and Lightfoot
- Jonathan Demme – Caged Heat
- Scott Hicks – The Wanderer
- Peter Hyams♦ – Our Time
- John Korty – Silense
- Richard Loncraine – Slade in Flame
- Nikita Mikhalkov† – At Home Among Strangers
- Ariane Mnouchkine – 1789
- Alan Ormsby – Deranged
- Wolfgang Petersen†♦ – Einer von uns beiden
- Oliver Stone† – Seizure
- Charles Swenson – Down and Dirty Duck
- Bertrand Tavernier – The Clockmaker
- Lewis Teague♦ – Dirty O'Neil
- Thierry Zéno† – Vase de Noces

=== 1975 ===
- Jean-Claude Brisseau – La croisee des chemins
- Patrice Chéreau – The Flesh of the Orchid
- Souleymane Cissé† – The Young Girl
- John Duigan – The Firm Man
- Terry Gilliam and Terry Jones – Monty Python and the Holy Grail
- Lasse Hallström♦ – A Guy and a Gal
- Walter Hill – Hard Times
- Shirley MacLaine – The Other Half of the Sky: A China Memoir
- Nikos Nikolaidis† – Evrydiki BA 2O37
- Joan Micklin Silver† – Hester Street
- Helma Sanders-Brahms – Unter dem Pflaster ist der Strand
- Margarethe von Trotta♦† – The Lost Honour of Katharina Blum
- Gene Wilder – The Adventure of Sherlock Holmes' Smarter Brother
- Joseph Zito – Abduction

== 1976–2025 ==
=== 1976 ===
- Cüneyt Arkın – Deli Şahin
- Allan Arkush† and Joe Dante† – Hollywood Boulevard
- Jean-Jacques Annaud – Black and White in Color
- John Badham♦ – The Bingo Long Traveling All-Stars & Motor Kings
- Catherine Breillat – A Real Young Girl
- Dyan Cannon – Number One
- Martha Coolidge† – Not a Pretty Picture
- Neal Israel – Tunnel Vision (Note: Co-directed with Bradley R. Swirnoff)
- Derek Jarman – Sebastiane
- Krzysztof Kieślowski†♦ – Personnel
- Patrice Leconte† – Les vécés étaient fermés de l'interieur
- Jeff Lieberman† – Squirm
- Robert Moore♦ – Murder by Death
- Alan Parker†♦ – Bugsy Malone
- Michael Pressman – The Great Texas Dynamite Chase
- Burt Reynolds♦ – Gator
- Fred Schepisi† – The Devil's Playground
- George Schlatter♦ – Norman... Is That You?
- Kartal Tibet – Tosun Paşa

=== 1977 ===
- Charles Band – Crash!
- Joseph Brooks# – You Light Up My Life
- Coluche – Vous n'aurez pas l'Alsace et la Lorraine
- Atom Egoyan – Lust of a Eunuch
- Valie Export – Unsichtbare Gegner
- Marty Feldman♦ – The Last Remake of Beau Geste
- Ron Howard† – Grand Theft Auto
- Jed Johnson – Bad
- Girish Kasaravalli – Ghatashraddha
- Diane Kurys – Peppermint Soda
- I. Robert Levy – Can I Do It... 'Til I Need Glasses?
- John Lounsbery – The Many Adventures of Winnie the Pooh (Note: Co-directed with Wolfgang Reitherman)
- David Lynch† – Eraserhead
- Gregory Nava† – The Confessions of Amans
- Hal Needham – Smokey and the Bandit
- Chris Noonan – Bulls
- Phillip Noyce† – Backroads
- Nobuhiko Obayashi† – House
- Phil Roman† – Race for Your Life, Charlie Brown (Note: Co-directed with Bill Melendez)
- Ridley Scott†♦ – The Duellists
- Art Stevens – The Rescuers (Note: Co-directed with John Lounsbery)
- Béla Tarr – Családi tűzfészek
- Richard Williams – Raggedy Ann & Andy: A Musical Adventure
- Fred Wolf – The Mouse and his Child

=== 1978 ===
- Lou Adler – Up in Smoke
- Alejandro Agresti† – El zoológico y el cementerio
- Muzaffar Ali – Gaman
- Bille August – Honning måne
- Warren Beatty and Buck Henry – Heaven Can Wait
- Charles Burnett† – Killer of Sheep
- Buddhadeb Dasgupta† – Dooratwa
- Colin Higgins – Foul Play
- Robert Klane – Thank God It's Friday
- Randal Kleiser♦ – Grease
- Severino "Nonoy" Marcelo♦† – Tadhana
- Richard Marquand – The Legacy
- Leiji Matsumoto♦ – Captain Harlock: Mystery of the Arcadia (Note: Co-directed with Rintaro)
- Errol Morris – Gates of Heaven
- Steve Rash – The Buddy Holly Story
- Joan Rivers – Rabbit Test
- Martin Rosen – Watership Down
- Paul Schrader – Blue Collar
- Alexander Sokurov† – The Lonely Voice of Man
- Sylvester Stallone – Paradise Alley
- James Toback – Fingers
- Jane Wagner – Moment by Moment
- Meir Zarchi – I Spit on Your Grave
- Robert Zemeckis – I Wanna Hold Your Hand

=== 1979 ===
- Carroll Ballard – The Black Stallion
- Martin Brest† – Going in Style
- Albert Brooks♦ – Real Life
- Jackie Chan – The Fearless Hyena (Note: Co-directed with Kenneth Tsang)
- Alan Clarke – Scum
- Abel Ferrara† – The Driller Killer
- Sam Firstenberg – For the Sake of the Dog
- Bill Forsyth – That Sinking Feeling
- Goutam Ghose† – Maabhoomi
- Tsui Hark – The Butterfly Murders
- Agnieszka Holland†♦ – Provincial Actors
- Ann Hui♦ – The Secret
- Leon Ichaso – El Super
- Michael Mann – The Jericho Mile
- George Miller – Mad Max
- Hayao Miyazaki♦ – The Castle of Cagliostro
- Russell Mulcahy – Derek and Clive Get the Horn
- George Peppard – Five Days from Home
- Chris Petit – Radio On
- Julien Temple – The Great Rock 'n' Roll Swindle
- Joan Tewkesbury – Old Boyfriends
- Simon Wincer♦ – Snapshot

=== 1980 ===
- Marilou Diaz-Abaya – Tanikala
- Pedro Almodóvar – Pepi, Luci, Bom
- Chuck Barris – The Gong Show Movie
- Walter Bernstein – Little Miss Marker
- Tony Bill – My Bodyguard
- William Peter Blatty – The Ninth Configuration
- George Bowers – The Hearse
- James Caan – Hide in Plain Sight
- Tommy Chong – Cheech and Chong's Next Movie
- Rob Cohen – A Small Circle of Friends
- Peter Greenaway† – The Falls
- Robert Greenwald – Xanadu
- Taylor Hackford♦† – The Idolmaker
- Jim Jarmusch – Permanent Vacation
- Art Linson – Where the Buffalo Roam
- Steven Lisberger – Animalympics
- Adrian Lyne† – Foxes
- William Malone – Scared to Death
- Mike Newell♦ – The Awakening
- Harold Ramis – Caddyshack
- Robert Redford – Ordinary People
- Jay Sandrich♦ – Seems Like Old Times
- John Sayles – Return of the Secaucus 7
- Roger Spottiswoode – Terror Train
- Fernando Trueba† – Opera Prima
- Nancy Walker – Can't Stop the Music
- Gordon Willis – Windows
- Jerry Zucker, Jim Abrahams, and David Zucker – Airplane!

=== 1981 ===
- Alan Alda♦ – The Four Seasons
- Graham Baker – Omen III: The Final Conflict
- Jean-Jacques Beineix – Diva
- Andrew Bergman – So Fine
- Ted Berman and Richard Rich – The Fox and the Hound (Note: Co-directed with Art Stevens)
- Edward Bianchi – The Fan
- Kathryn Bigelow and Monty Montgomery – The Loveless
- Peter Bonerz♦ – Nobody's Perfekt
- Howard R. Cohen – Saturday the 14th
- Francis Delia – Nightdreams
- Uli Edel – Christiane F.
- John Glen† – For Your Eyes Only
- Vadim Glowna – Desperado City
- Steve Gordon♦ – Arthur
- Jim Henson†♦ – The Great Muppet Caper
- Michael Herz – Waitress!
- Hugh Hudson† – Chariots of Fire
- Jandhyala – Mudda Mandaram
- Glenn Jordan♦ – Only When I Laugh
- Lawrence Kasdan – Body Heat
- Mika Kaurismäki – The Liar
- Emir Kusturica†♦ – Do You Remember Dolly Bell?
- Ron Mann† – Imagine the Sound
- Steve Miner – Friday the 13th Part 2
- Juan Miñón and Miguel Ángel Trujillo – Kargus
- Nettie Peña – Home Sweet Home
- Sam Raimi† – The Evil Dead
- Rick Rosenthal – Halloween II
- Joel Schumacher♦ – The Incredible Shrinking Woman
- Oz Scott – Bustin' Loose
- Penelope Spheeris† – The Decline of Western Civilization
- Zoran Tadić – Rhythm of a Crime
- Roger Young – Bitter Harvest

=== 1982 ===
- Jahnu Barua† – Aparoopa
- Richard Benjamin♦ – My Favorite Year
- Khairy Beshara♦ – Bloody Destinies
- Patricia Birch♦ – Grease 2
- Don Bluth† – The Secret of NIMH
- Patrick Bokanowski† – The Angel
- James Cameron† – Piranha II: The Spawning
- Nick Castle – Tag: The Assassination Game
- Roger Christian – The Sender
- Graeme Clifford†♦ – Frances
- Caleb Deschanel† – The Escape Artist
- Richard Elfman – Forbidden Zone
- Stuart Gillard – Paradise
- Don Gronquist – Unhinged
- Amy Heckerling† – Fast Times at Ridgemont High
- Amy Holden Jones – The Slumber Party Massacre
- Tim Hunter – Tex
- Neil Jordan – Angel
- John Laing – Beyond Reasonable Doubt
- Barry Levinson – Diner
- Aaron Lipstadt – Android
- Garry Marshall♦ – Young Doctors in Love
- Frank Oz – The Dark Crystal
- Albert Pyun – The Sword and the Sorcerer
- Susan Seidelman† – Smithereens
- Robert Towne – Personal Best
- Michael Toshiyuki Uno†♦ – The Silence
- David S. Ward – Cannery Row
- Edward Yang – In Our Time
- Corey Yuen – Ninja in the Dragon's Den
- Ronny Yu – The Postman Strikes Back

=== 1983 ===
- Joe Alves – Jaws 3-D
- Roberto Benigni – You Upset Me
- Luc Besson† – Le Dernier Combat
- Paul Brickman – Risky Business
- James L. Brooks – Terms of Endearment
- Claudio Caligari – Toxic Love
- Michael Chapman – All the Right Moves
- Robert Dalva – The Black Stallion Returns
- Mel Damski – Yellowbeard
- Pál Erdöss – The Princess
- Richard Eyre — The Ploughman's Lunch
- John Herzfeld – Two of a Kind
- Robert Hiltzik – Sleepaway Camp
- Robert Jiras – I Am the Cheese
- Alan Johnson – To Be or Not to Be
- Shekhar Kapur – Masoom
- Aki Kaurismäki – Crime and Punishment
- David Kendall – Luggage of the Gods!
- Beeban Kidron and Amanda Richardson – Carry Greenham Home
- Jackie Kong – The Being
- Kiyoshi Kurosawa – Kandagawa Pervert Wars
- Mohsen Makhmalbaf – Tobeh Nosuh
- Robert Mandel – Independence Day
- Rick Moranis and Dave Thomas – Strange Brew
- Mamoru Oshii♦ – Urusei Yatsura: Only You
- Euzhan Palcy – Sugar Cane Alley
- Michael Radford† – Another Time, Another Place
- Mani Ratnam – Pallavi Anu Pallavi
- Sandip Ray – Phatik Chand
- Mark Rosman – The House on Sorority Row
- Tony Scott† – The Hunger
- James Signorelli – Easy Money
- Ching Siu-tung – Duel to the Death
- Barbra Streisand – Yentl
- David Worth – Warrior of the Lost World
- Yevgeny Yevtushenko – Kindergarten

=== 1984 ===
- David Allen, John Carl Buechler, and Ted Nicolaou – The Dungeonmaster
- Steve Barron† – Electric Dreams
- Leos Carax – Boy Meets Girl
- Ethan Coen and Joel Coen – Blood Simple
- Alex Cox – Repo Man
- Gérard Depardieu – Le tartuffe
- Roland Emmerich† – The Noah's Ark Principle
- James Foley – Reckless
- Herb Gardner – The Goodbye People
- Brian Gilbert – The Frog Prince
- Paul Michael Glaser†♦ – Amazons
- Ruud van Hemert – Army Brats
- John Hughes – Sixteen Candles
- Juzo Itami – The Funeral
- Roland Joffé♦ – The Killing Fields
- Chen Kaige – Yellow Earth
- Marek Kanievska – Another Country
- Yoshiaki Kawajiri – Lensman
- Fritz Kiersch – Children of the Corn
- Ken Kwapis♦ – The Beniker Gang
- Albert Magnoli† – Purple Rain
- Luis Mandoki – Motel
- Leonard Nimoy♦ – Star Trek III: The Search for Spock
- Rob Reiner♦ – This Is Spinal Tap
- W. D. Richter – The Adventures of Buckaroo Banzai Across the 8th Dimension
- Valeria Sarmiento – Notre mariage
- Charles Shyer – Irreconcilable Differences
- Gene Taft – Blame It on the Night
- Lars von Trier – The Element of Crime
- Peter Webb – Give My Regards to Broad Street
- Hugh Wilson†♦ – Police Academy

=== 1985 ===
- Dodo Abashidze – The Legend of Suram Fortress
- Dan Attias – Silver Bullet
- Hal Barwood† – Warning Sign
- Jonathan R. Betuel – My Science Project
- Jeff Bleckner♦ – Do You Remember Love
- Tim Burton†♦ – Pee-wee's Big Adventure
- John Cherry – Dr. Otto and the Riddle of the Gloom Beam
- Joyce Chopra† – Smooth Talk
- Rod Daniel♦ – Teen Wolf
- Stuart Gordon♦ – Re-Animator
- Lisa Gottlieb – Just One of the Guys
- Stephen Gyllenhaal – Certain Fury
- Savage Steve Holland – Better Off Dead
- Tom Holland – Fright Night
- Huang Jianxin – The Black Cannon Incident
- Amos Kollek – Goodbye, New York
- Stanley Kwan – Women
- Ricky Lau – Mr. Vampire
- Dwight H. Little – KGB: The Secret War
- Jonathan Lynn – Clue
- Alan Metter – Girls Just Want to Have Fun
- Walter Murch – Return to Oz
- Yousry Nasrallah – Summer Thefts
- Francesco Nuti – Casablanca, Casablanca
- James Orr – Breaking All the Rules
- Mark Romanek – Static
- Gus Van Sant†♦ – Mala Noche
- Arna Selznick – The Care Bears Movie
- Alan Sharp – Little Treasure
- Howard Storm♦ – Once Bitten
- Fina Torres – Oriana
- Will Vinton – The Adventures of Mark Twain
- Terry Zwigoff – Louie Bluie

=== 1986 ===
- David Anspaugh – Hoosiers
- Olivier Assayas† – Disorder
- David Byrne† – True Stories
- Jane Campion†♦ – Two Friends
- Ron Clements, Burny Mattinson, David Michener, and John Musker – The Great Mouse Detective
- Fred Dekker – Night of the Creeps
- Jeffrey Delman – Deadtime Stories
- Howard Deutch† – Pretty in Pink
- Emilio Estevez – Wisdom
- Peter Faiman♦ – Crocodile Dundee
- Vítor Gonçalves – A Girl In Summer
- Renny Harlin†♦ – Born American
- Stephen Herek – Critters
- Connie Kaiserman – My Little Girl
- Stephen King – Maximum Overdrive
- Jerry Kramer – Modern Girls
- Spike Lee† – She's Gotta Have It
- Sondra Locke – Ratboy
- Penny Marshall♦ – Jumpin' Jack Flash
- John McNaughton† – Henry: Portrait of a Serial Killer
- John McTiernan – Nomads
- Michael Parks – The Return of Josey Wales
- Anthony Perkins – Psycho III
- Maurice Phillips – The American Way
- Prince† – Under the Cherry Moon
- Bruce Robinson – Withnail and I
- Joe Roth – Streets of Gold
- Dale Schott – The Care Bears Movie II: A New Generation
- David Seltzer♦ – Lucas
- Charles Martin Smith – Trick or Treat
- Sion Sono† – Man's Flower Road
- Ziggy Steinberg – The Boss' Wife
- Giuseppe Tornatore – The Professor
- Agustí Villaronga – Tras el cristal
- Edward Zwick – About Last Night...

=== 1987 ===
- Allison Anders – Border Radio
- Emile Ardolino♦ – Dirty Dancing
- Deborah Brock – Slumber Party Massacre II
- Chris Columbus – Adventures in Babysitting
- Bill Condon – Sister, Sister
- Danny DeVito†♦ – Throw Momma from the Train
- Nigel Dick† – P.I. Private Investigations
- Jim Drake† – Police Academy 4: Citizens on Patrol
- Steve Gomer† – Sweet Lorraine
- Flora Gomes – Mortu Nega
- Michael Gornick†♦ – Creepshow 2
- Tamar Simon Hoffs† – The Allnighter
- Stephen Hopkins – Dangerous Game
- Peter Jackson† – Bad Taste
- Phil Joanou† – Three O'Clock High
- Diane Keaton – Heaven
- Mary Lambert – Siesta
- Luis Llosa Urquidi – Hour of the Assassin
- David Mamet – House of Games
- Cheech Marin – Born in East L.A.
- Jerry Rees – The Brave Little Toaster
- Max Reid – Wild Thing
- Phil Alden Robinson – In the Mood
- Chuck Russell – A Nightmare on Elm Street 3: Dream Warriors
- Jay Russell – The End of the Line
- John Stockwell – Undercover
- Robert Townsend – Hollywood Shuffle
- Charles Winkler – You Talkin' to Me?

=== 1988 ===
- Greg Beeman♦ – License to Drive
- Glenn Gordon Caron – Clean and Sober
- Stephen Chiodo – Killer Klowns from Outer Space
- Christopher Coppola – Dracula's Widow
- John Cornell – Crocodile Dundee II
- Claire Denis – Chocolat
- Robert Englund – 976-EVIL
- Reha Erdem – Oh, Moon!
- Bran Ferren – Funny: A Bran Ferren Film
- Mike Figgis♦ – Stormy Monday
- Andrew Fleming – Bad Dreams
- Mick Garris♦ – Critters 2: The Main Course
- Daniel Goldberg – Feds
- Keith Gordon – The Chocolate War
- Bob Hoskins – The Raggedy Rawney
- Kenneth Johnson – Short Circuit 2
- Shaji N. Karun – Piravi
- Wong Kar-wai – Wong Gok Ka Moon
- Fran Rubel Kuzui – Tokyo Pop
- John Lafia – The Blue Iguana
- Richard Linklater – It's Impossible to Learn to Plow by Reading Books
- Peter MacDonald – Rambo III
- Guy Maddin† – Tales from the Gimli Hospital
- Ramón Menéndez – Stand and Deliver
- Chris Menges – A World Apart
- Rocky Morton†♦ and Annabel Jankel†♦ – D.O.A.
- Mira Nair†♦ – Salaam Bombay!
- Donald Petrie♦ – Mystic Pizza
- Tina Rathborne♦ – Zelly and Me
- Bernard Rose – Paperhouse
- Skip Schoolnik – Hide and Go Shriek
- George Scribner – Oliver & Company
- Ron Shelton – Bull Durham
- Gary Sinise – Miles from Home
- Jan Švankmajer† – Alice
- Ernest Thompson – 1969
- Aisling Walsh† – Joyriders
- Keenen Ivory Wayans – I'm Gonna Git You Sucka
- Henry Winkler♦ – Memories of Me
- Terence H. Winkless – The Nest
- Stan Winston – Pumpkinhead
- Zhang Yimou – Red Sorghum

=== 1989 ===
- Meiert Avis† – Far from Home
- Sooraj Barjatya – Maine Pyar Kiya
- Jeff Blyth – Cheetah
- Kenneth Branagh – Henry V
- Jeremiah S. Chechik – National Lampoon's Christmas Vacation
- Isabel Coixet† – Demasiado viejo para morir joven
- Pedro Costa – O Sangue
- Cameron Crowe – Say Anything...
- John Dahl – Kill Me Again
- Carl Franklin† – Nowhere to Run
- Richard Alan Greenberg – Little Monsters
- Paul Greengrass♦ – Resurrected
- Gary David Goldberg – Dad
- Gary Goldman and Dan Kuenster – All Dogs Go to Heaven (Note: Co-directed with Don Bluth)
- Wendell B. Harris Jr. – Chameleon Street
- Michael Haneke♦ – The Seventh Continent
- Rob Hedden – Friday the 13th Part VIII: Jason Takes Manhattan
- James Isaac – The Horror Show
- Joe Johnston – Honey, I Shrunk the Kids
- Takeshi Kitano – Violent Cop
- Michael Lehmann† – Heathers
- Brett Leonard – The Dead Pit
- Sean McNamara – Hollywood Chaos
- Tahmineh Milani – Children of Divorce
- Michael Moore – Roger & Me
- Jonathan Mostow† – Beverly Hills Bodysnatchers
- Eddie Murphy – Harlem Nights
- David Peoples† – The Blood of Heroes
- Alex Proyas† – Spirits of the Air, Gremlins of the Clouds
- Joe Pytka† – Let It Ride
- Eric Red† – Cohen and Tate
- Junji Sakamoto – Dotsuitarunen
- Victor Salva – Clownhouse
- Nancy Savoca – True Love
- Thomas Schlamme♦† – Miss Firecracker
- William Shatner – Star Trek V: The Final Frontier
- Jim Sheridan – My Left Foot
- Robert Sigl – Laurin
- Mel Smith – The Tall Guy
- Steven Soderbergh† – Sex, Lies, and Videotape
- Todd Solondz† – Fear, Anxiety & Depression
- Stephen Sommers – Catch Me If You Can
- Ann Turner – Celia
- Joseph Vilsmaier – Autumn Milk
- Chris Walas – The Fly II
- Gary Winick – Curfew
- Joel Zwick♦ – Second Sight

=== 1990 ===
- Hendel Butoy and Mike Gabriel – The Rescuers Down Under
- Benny Chan – A Moment of Romance
- Richard Correll – Ski Patrol
- Kevin Costner – Dances with Wolves
- Manny Coto – Playroom
- Dennis Dugan♦ – Problem Child
- David Elfick – Harbour Beat
- Michael Fields – Bright Angel
- Howard Franklin and Bill Murray – Quick Change
- Shankar–Ganesh – Jagathalaprathapan
- Nicole Garcia – Every Other Weekend
- John Harrison†♦ – Tales from the Darkside: The Movie
- Bob Hathcock♦† – DuckTales the Movie: Treasure of the Lost Lamp
- Reginald Hudlin† – House Party
- James Keach – False Identity
- Indra Kumar – Dil
- Sheldon Lettich – Lionheart
- Caroline Link†♦ – Sommertage
- Frank Marshall – Arachnophobia
- Joji Matsuoka† – Batāshi Kingyo
- Sally Mattison – Slumber Party Massacre III
- Anthony Minghella – Truly, Madly, Deeply
- Stanley Nelson Jr.† – Freedom Bags
- Dean Parisot†♦ – Framed
- James D. Parriott – Heart Condition
- Michele Placido – Pummarò
- Jay Roach – Zoo Radio (Note: Co-directed with Jesse Wells)
- Tom Ropelewski – Madhouse
- Sergio Rubini – The Station
- Rajkumar Santoshi – Ghayal
- Tom Savini – Night of the Living Dead
- Lone Scherfig♦ – Kaj's fødselsdag
- Ulrich Seidl† – Good News
- V. Sekhar – Neengalum Herothan
- John Patrick Shanley – Joe Versus the Volcano
- Robert Shaye – Book of Love
- Martin Sheen – Cadence
- Sangeeth Sivan – Vyooham
- Whit Stillman – Metropolitan
- Jon Turteltaub – Think Big
- Zdeněk Tyc – Vojtech, Called the Orphan
- Ron Underwood†♦ – Tremors
- Vasanth – Keladi Kannmanii
- Thomas Vinterberg – Sneblind
- Michael Winterbottom♦ – Forget About Me
- Zhang Yuan† – Mama

=== 1991 ===
- Jon Avnet♦ – Fried Green Tomatoes
- Dan Aykroyd – Nothing but Trouble
- Marco Bechis† – Alambrado
- Jack Bender♦ – Child's Play 3
- Susanne Bier† – Freud flyttar hemifrån...
- Juan Jose Campanella – The Boy Who Cried Bitch
- Topper Carew – Talkin' Dirty After Dark
- Carlos Carrera† – La mujer de Benjamín
- Peter Chelsom† – Hear My Song
- Bud Cort – Ted & Venus
- Alfonso Cuarón†♦ – Sólo Con Tu Pareja
- Frank De Felitta♦ – Scissors
- Arnaud Desplechin – La Vie Des Morts
- Tom DiCillo – Johnny Suede
- Jaco Van Dormael♦ – Toto the Hero
- Christian Duguay – Scanners II: The New Order
- Bill Duke†♦ – A Rage in Harlem
- Jodie Foster – Little Man Tate
- Randall Fried – Heaven Is a Playground
- George Gallo – 29th Street
- Screaming Mad George and Steve Wang – The Guyver
- Bobcat Goldthwait – Shakes the Clown
- Bryan Gordon† – Career Opportunities
- Mark Herrier – Popcorn
- Todd Haynes† – Poison
- Peter Hewitt† – Bill & Ted's Bogus Journey
- Kevin Hooks♦ – Strictly Business
- Jeffrey Hornaday♦† – Shout
- Jean-Pierre Jeunet† and Marc Caro† – Delicatessen
- David Kellogg† – Cool as Ice
- Mimi Leder♦ – A Little Piece of Heaven
- Brian Levant♦ – Problem Child 2
- Doug McHenry and George Jackson – House Party 2
- Deepa Mehta♦ – Sam & Me
- Takashi Miike – Lady Hunter: Prelude to Murder
- Phil Nibbelink and Simon Wells – An American Tail: Fievel Goes West
- Garin Nugroho – Cinta dalam Sepotong Roti
- Mario Van Peebles♦ – New Jack City
- Sean Penn – The Indian Runner
- David Price – Son of Darkness: To Die For II
- Matty Rich – Straight Out of Brooklyn
- Walter Salles – A Grande Arte
- John Singleton – Boyz n the Hood
- Barry Sonnenfeld – The Addams Family
- Rachel Talalay – Freddy's Dead: The Final Nightmare
- Gary Trousdale and Kirk Wise – Beauty and the Beast
- Joseph Vásquez – Hangin' with the Homeboys
- Irwin Winkler – Guilty by Suspicion

=== 1992 ===
- Rémy Belvaux†, André Bonzel†, and Benoît Poelvoorde† – Man Bites Dog
- Mike Binder – Crossing the Bridge
- Uwe Boll – German Fried Movie (Note: Co-directed with Frank Lustig)
- Craig Bolotin† – That Night
- Park Chan-wook – The Moon Is... the Sun's Dream
- Rich Christiano – Second Glance
- Billy Crystal – Mr. Saturday Night
- Gregory Dark – Mirror Images
- Tamra Davis† – Guncrazy
- Ernest Dickerson – Juice
- Nora Ephron – This Is My Life
- David Fincher† – Alien³
- Rituparno Ghosh - Hirer Angti
- Arne Glimcher – The Mambo Kings
- Leslie Harris – Just Another Girl on the I.R.T.
- Brian Henson – The Muppet Christmas Carol
- Mark Herman† – Blame It on the Bellboy
- Bill Kroyer† – FernGully: The Last Rainforest
- Dale Launer - Love Potion No. 9
- Ang Lee – Pushing Hands
- Eugene Levy – Once Upon a Crime
- Baz Luhrmann – Strictly Ballroom
- Les Mayfield♦† – Encino Man
- Randall Miller♦† – Class Act
- Tsai Ming-liang♦ – Rebels of the Neon God
- Edward James Olmos♦ – American Me
- Kenny Ortega†♦ – Newsies
- Charlie Peters – Passed Away
- Bill Plympton† – The Tune
- Tim Robbins – Bob Roberts
- Robert Rodriguez† – El Mariachi
- Damon Santostefano† – Severed Ties
- M. Night Shyamalan – Praying with Anger
- Bruce W. Smith – Bebe's Kids
- Quentin Tarantino† – Reservoir Dogs
- Betty Thomas♦ – Only You
- John Turturro – Mac
- David Twohy – Timescape
- Prasanna Vithanage – Sisila Giniganee

=== 1993 ===
- Daniel Alfredson†♦ – Roseanna
- Gary O. Bennett – Rain Without Thunder
- Marco Brambilla – Demolition Man
- Thomas Carter♦ – Swing Kids
- Gurinder Chadha♦† – Bhaji on the Beach
- Rusty Cundieff – Fear of a Black Hat
- Robert De Niro – A Bronx Tale
- Guillermo del Toro† – Cronos
- Ted Demme♦† – Who's the Man?
- Duwayne Dunham – Homeward Bound: The Incredible Journey
- David Mickey Evans – The Sandlot
- Morgan Freeman – Bopha!
- E. Max Frye – Amos & Andrew
- Mel Gibson – The Man Without a Face
- Charles Grosvenor – Once Upon a Forest
- Paul Haggis♦† – Red Hot
- Fraser Clarke Heston♦† – Needful Things
- Hughes brothers – Menace II Society
- Mark Jones – Leprechaun
- Nicholas Kazan♦ – Dream Lover
- Mathieu Kassovitz – Métisse
- John Madden♦ – Ethan Frome
- Radu Mihăileanu† – Trahir
- Trey Parker† – Cannibal! The Musical
- Bruce Joel Rubin – My Life
- Mikael Salomon – A Far Off Place
- Don Scardino♦ – Me and Veronica
- Henry Selick† – The Nightmare Before Christmas
- Dominic Sena† – Kalifornia
- Alan Shapiro – The Crush
- Bryan Singer† – Public Access
- Daniel Stern♦ – Rookie of the Year
- Stephen Surjik†♦ – Wayne's World 2
- Tran Anh Hung† – The Scent of Green Papaya
- Tom Tykwer† – Deadly Maria
- John Whitesell♦ – Calendar Girl
- Alex Winter and Tom Stern – Freaked
- Wang Xiaoshuai – The Days
- Steven Zaillian – Searching for Bobby Fischer
- Dick Zondag and Ralph Zondag – We're Back! A Dinosaur's Story (Note: Co-directed with Phil Nibbelink and Simon Wells)

=== 1994 ===
- Roger Allers and Rob Minkoff† – The Lion King
- Paul W. S. Anderson – Shopping
- Jacques Audiard – Regarde les hommes tomber
- Roger Avary – Killing Zoe
- Timur Bekmambetov♦ – Peshavar Waltz
- Adam Bernstein† – It's Pat
- Hart Bochner – PCU
- Jan de Bont – Speed
- Danny Boyle♦ – Shallow Grave
- Stephen Chow – King of Destruction
- Julie Cypher† – Teresa's Tattoo
- Frank Darabont♦ – The Shawshank Redemption
- Peter Farrelly – Dumb and Dumber
- Jun Falkenstein – Scooby-Doo! in Arabian Nights
- James Gray – Little Odessa
- Anthony Michael Hall – Hail Caesar
- P. J. Hogan† – Muriel's Wedding
- George Huang – Swimming with Sharks
- Maurice Hunt – The Pagemaster (Note: Co-directed with Joe Johnston)
- Nicholas Hytner – The Madness of King George
- Patrick Keiller† – London
- Olivia M. Lamasan♦ – Maalaala Mo Kaya: The Movie
- Doug Liman – Getting In
- Darnell Martin† – I Like It Like That
- Jessie Nelson† – Corrina, Corrina
- John Pasquin♦ – The Santa Clause
- Jeff Pollack – Above the Rim
- Jonathan Prince♦ – Camp Nowhere
- Kelly Reichardt – River of Grass
- Adam Resnick – Cabin Boy
- John Roberts – War of the Buttons
- David O. Russell† – Spanking the Monkey
- Steven Seagal – On Deadly Ground
- Peter Segal♦ – Naked Gun 33⅓: The Final Insult
- Tom Shadyac♦ – Ace Ventura: Pet Detective
- Kevin Smith† – Clerks
- Ben Stiller♦† – Reality Bites
- Lee Tamahori†♦ – Once Were Warriors
- Caroline Thompson – Black Beauty
- Sam Weisman – D2: The Mighty Ducks

=== 1995 ===
- Tomas Alfredson♦ – Bert: The Last Virgin
- Debbie Allen♦ – Out-of-Sync
- Jason Alexander♦ – For Better or Worse
- Brad Anderson – Frankenstein's Planet of Monsters!
- Noah Baumbach – Kicking and Screaming
- Michael Bay† – Bad Boys
- Larry Bishop – Mad Dog Time
- Icíar Bollaín†♦ – Hola, ¿estás sola?
- Joshua Brand – A Pyromaniac's Love Story
- Steven Brill – Heavyweights
- Stephen Chbosky – The Four Corners of Nowhere
- Aditya Chopra – Dilwale Dulhania Le Jayenge
- Larry Clark – Kids
- Art Clokey – Gumby: The Movie
- Joel Cohen and Alec Sokolow – Monster Mash
- Frank Coraci – Murdered Innocence
- Gary Fleder♦ – Things to Do in Denver When You're Dead
- Marc Forster – Loungers
- John Fortenberry♦ – Jury Duty
- David Frankel♦ – Miami Rhapsody
- Christophe Gans† – Crying Freeman
- Lesli Linka Glatter†♦ – Now and Then
- Eric Goldberg – Pocahontas (Note: Co-directed with Mike Gabriel)
- F. Gary Gray† – Friday
- Charles Herman-Wurmfeld – Fanci's Persuasion
- Nick Hurran – The Perfect Match
- Scott Kalvert – The Basketball Diaries
- Hirokazu Kore-eda – Maborosi
- Robert Kurtzman – The Demolitionist
- John Lasseter† – Toy Story
- Kevin Lima – A Goofy Movie
- Robert Longo† – Johnny Mnemonic
- James Mangold – Heavy
- Daisy von Scherler Mayer – Party Girl
- Melanie Mayron♦ – The Baby-Sitters Club
- Rebecca Miller – Angela
- Tab Murphy – Last of the Dogmen
- Gavin O'Connor† – Comfortably Numb
- Steve Oedekerk† – Ace Ventura: When Nature Calls
- Jafar Panahi – The White Balloon
- Oliver Parker – Othello
- Jean-François Richet – État des lieux
- Brian Robbins – The Show
- Joaquim Sapinho – Haircut
- Hans-Christian Schmid†♦ – Nach Fünf im Urwald
- Holly Goldberg Sloan – The Big Green
- Bryan Spicer♦ – Mighty Morphin Power Rangers: The Movie
- Brad Silberling†♦ – Casper
- Rick Stevenson – Magic in the Water
- Wesley Strick – The Tie That Binds
- Alan Taylor†♦ – Palookaville
- Andy Tennant♦ – It Takes Two
- Forest Whitaker♦ – Waiting to Exhale
- Gregory Widen♦ – The Prophecy
- Edgar Wright – A Fistful of Fingers
- Lou Ye – Weekend Lover

=== 1996 ===
- Alejandro Amenábar – Tesis
- Paul Thomas Anderson† – Hard Eight
- Wes Anderson – Bottle Rocket
- Imanol Arias — Un asunto privado
- Kevin Bacon – Losing Chase
- Stuart Baird – Executive Decision
- Paris Barclay† – Don't Be a Menace to South Central While Drinking Your Juice in the Hood
- Jason Bloom† – Bio-Dome
- Matthew Bright – Freeway
- Matthew Broderick – Infinity
- Steve Buscemi – Trees Lounge
- Nick Cassavetes – Unhook the Stars
- Jay Chandrasekhar – Puddle Cruiser
- R. J. Cutler – A Perfect Candidate (Note: Co-directed with David Van Taylor)
- Tom DeCerchio – Celtic Pride
- Seth Michael Donsky – Twisted
- Cheryl Dunye† – The Watermelon Woman
- David R. Ellis – Homeward Bound II: Lost in San Francisco
- Bobby Farrelly – Kingpin (Note: Co-directed with Peter Farrelly)
- Jonathan Frakes♦ – Star Trek: First Contact
- Terry George – Some Mother's Son
- Michael Goldenberg – Bed of Roses
- Tom Hanks♦ – That Thing You Do!
- Mary Harron♦ – I Shot Andy Warhol
- Gregory Hoblit♦ – Primal Fear
- Nicole Holofcener† – Walking and Talking
- Anthony Hopkins – August
- Adam Coleman Howard – Dead Girl
- Bronwen Hughes† – Harriet the Spy
- Anjelica Huston – Bastard Out of Carolina
- Mike Judge†♦ – Beavis and Butt-Head Do America
- David Koepp† – The Trigger Effect
- Andrew Kötting† – Gallivant
- Kim Ki-duk†♦ – Crocodile
- Zeka Laplaine† – Macadam Tribu
- Martin Lawrence – A Thin Line Between Love and Hate
- Quentin Lee† – Flow
- Danny Leiner† – Layin' Low
- Larry Leker and Paul Sabella – All Dogs Go to Heaven 2
- Kevin Macdonald♦ – Chaplin's Goliath
- Jim Mallon – Mystery Science Theater 3000: The Movie
- Nelson McCormick♦ – For Which He Stands
- Douglas McGrath – Emma
- Shane Meadows† – Small Time
- Greg Mottola – The Daytrippers
- Niels Arden Oplev† – Portland
- Al Pacino – Looking for Richard
- Alexander Payne – Citizen Ruth
- John Putch† – Alone in the Woods
- Krishna Rao – Crossworlds
- Matt Reeves† – The Pallbearer
- Nicolas Winding Refn – Pusher
- Sabu – Dangan Runner
- Arlene Sanford♦ – A Very Brady Sequel
- John Schultz – Bandwagon
- Campbell Scott and Stanley Tucci – Big Night
- Adrienne Shelly† – Sudden Manhattan
- Daryush Shokof – Seven Servants
- Kevin Spacey† – Albino Alligator
- Kevin Rodney Sullivan – America's Dream
- Billy Bob Thornton – Sling Blade
- Gary J. Tunnicliffe – Within the Rock
- Kevin Yagher – Hellraiser: Bloodline
- The Wachowskis – Bound
- Sean Weathers – House of the Damned

=== 1997 ===
- Miguel Arteta – Star Maps
- William Brent Bell – Sparkle and Charm
- Peter Cattaneo – The Full Monty
- Nuri Bilge Ceylan – Kasaba
- Dean Cundey – Honey, We Shrunk Ourselves
- Vondie Curtis-Hall – Gridlock'd
- Johnny Depp♦ – The Brave
- Vin Diesel† – Strays
- Mark Dindal – Cats Don't Dance
- Mark A.Z. Dippé – Spawn
- Bruno Dumont – La vie de Jésus
- Griffin Dunne – Addicted to Love
- Raja Gosnell – Home Alone 3
- Stephen Kessler – Vegas Vacation
- Bob Koherr – Plump Fiction
- Satoshi Kon – Perfect Blue
- Harmony Korine – Gummo
- Neil LaBute – In the Company of Men
- Kasi Lemmons – Eve's Bayou
- John R. Leonetti – Mortal Kombat Annihilation
- Shawn Levy – Just in Time
- Justin Lin – Shopping for Fangs (Note: Co-directed with Quentin Lee)
- Paul Miller – The Pest
- Troy Miller – Beverly Hills Family Robinson
- David Mirkin♦ – Romy and Michele's High School Reunion
- Vincenzo Natali – Cube
- Andrew Niccol – Gattaca
- Darrin Stein – Sparkler
- William Nicholson♦ – Firelight
- Cherie Nowlan† – Thank God He Met Lizzie
- Peter O'Fallon♦ – Suicide Kings
- Gary Oldman – Nil by Mouth
- François Ozon† – Regarde la Mer
- Mark Pellington†♦ – Going All the Way
- Rafi Pitts† – The Fifth Season
- Brett Ratner† – Money Talks
- Tom Schulman – 8 Heads in a Duffel Bag
- Abderrahmane Sissako† – Rostov-Luanda
- Jill Sprecher – Clockwatchers
- Tim Story – One of Us Tripped
- Kiefer Sutherland♦ – Truth or Consequences, N.M.
- George Tillman Jr.† – Soul Food
- Gore Verbinski† – MouseHunt
- Mark Waters – The House of Yes
- Simon West – Con Air
- Scott Winant – 'Til There Was You
- Theodore Witcher – Love Jones
- Jia Zhangke – Xiao Wu

=== 1998 ===
- Fatih Akin†♦ – Short Sharp Shock
- Darren Aronofsky† – Pi
- Matt Earl Beesley – Point Blank
- Peter Berg♦ – Very Bad Things
- Troy Byer – Let's Talk About Sex
- Steve Boyum – Meet the Deedles
- Adrián Caetano and Bruno Stagnaro – Pizza, Beer, and Cigarettes
- Joe Carnahan – Blood, Guts, Bullets and Octane
- Niki Caro† – Memory & Desire
- Brenda Chapman and Steve Hickner – The Prince of Egypt (Note: Co-directed with Simon Wells)
- Frederik Du Chau – Quest for Camelot
- Lisa Cholodenko† – High Art
- Joan Chen – Xiu Xiu: The Sent Down Girl
- Derek Cianfrance – Brother Tied
- Barry Cook and Tony Bancroft – Mulan
- Ice Cube† – The Players Club
- Jonathan Darby – Hush
- Eric Darnell and Tim Johnson – Antz
- Larry David – Sour Grapes
- David Dobkin† – Clay Pigeons
- Soleil Moon Frye and Meeno Peluce – Wild Horses
- Antoine Fuqua† – The Replacement Killers
- Vincent Gallo – Buffalo '66
- Craig Hamann – Boogie Boy
- Peter Howitt – Sliding Doors
- Wayne Isham† – 12 Bucks
- Karan Johar – Kuch Kuch Hota Hai
- Mark Steven Johnson – Simon Birch
- Deborah Kaplan and Harry Elfont – Can't Hardly Wait
- Jake Kasdan† – Zero Effect
- Tony Kaye†♦ – American History X
- Nagesh Kukunoor – Hyderabad Blues
- Samira Makhmalbaf – The Apple
- Michael Martin – I Got the Hook-Up
- Sean Mathias – Bent
- Des McAnuff – Cousin Bette
- Paul McGuigan – The Acid House
- Don McKellar† – Last Night
- Fernando Meirelles†♦ – O Menino Maluquinho 2
- Nancy Meyers – The Parent Trap
- Bennett Miller – The Cruise
- Lukas Moodysson – Show Me Love
- Gaspar Noé† – Seul contre tous
- Christopher Nolan† – Following
- Pat Proft – Wrongfully Accused
- Guy Ritchie† – Lock, Stock and Two Smoking Barrels
- Craig Ross Jr. – Cappuccino
- Gary Ross – Pleasantville
- Bob Saget†♦ – Dirty Work
- Millicent Shelton†♦ – Ride
- Tony Singletary♦ – High Freakquency
- John Terlesky – The Pandora Project (Note: Co-directed with Jim Wynorski)
- Toshiaki Toyoda – Pornostar
- Denis Villeneuve† – August 32nd on Earth
- Norton Virgien and Igor Kovalyov – The Rugrats Movie
- Randall Wallace – The Man in the Iron Mask
- Hype Williams† – Belly
- David Yates† – The Tichborne Claimant

=== 1999 ===
- Jamie Babbit†♦ – But I'm a Cheerleader
- Jaume Balagueró – The Nameless
- Antonio Banderas – Crazy in Alabama
- Mike Barker†♦ – Best Laid Plans
- Brad Bird♦ – The Iron Giant
- John Bruno† – Virus
- Chris Buck – Tarzan (Note: Co-directed with Kevin Lima)
- Tony Bui† – Three Seasons
- Sofia Coppola† – The Virgin Suicides
- Troy Duffy – The Boondock Saints
- Jim Fall – Trick
- Rick Famuyiwa† – The Wood
- Hampton Fancher – The Minus Man
- Jeff Franklin♦ – Love Stinks
- Tony Goldwyn – A Walk on the Moon
- Michael Grossman – Road Block
- Luca Guadagnino – The Protagonists
- Don Hahn, Francis Glebas, and Paul and Gaëtan Brizzi – Fantasia 2000 (Note: Co-directed with Eric Goldberg, Pixote Hunt, James Algar and Hendel Butoy)
- Gary Halvorson♦ – The Adventures of Elmo in Grouchland
- Brian Helgeland – Payback
- Tim Hill†♦ – Muppets from Space
- Gavin Hood† – A Reasonable Man
- Mark Illsley – Happy, Texas
- Michael Patrick Jann – Drop Dead Gorgeous
- Hugh Johnson† – Chill Factor
- Spike Jonze† – Being John Malkovich
- Maurice Joyce – Doug's 1st Movie
- Gil Junger♦ – 10 Things I Hate About You
- Clare Kilner† – Janice Beard
- Roger Kumble – Cruel Intentions
- Paul Lazarus♦ – Seven Girlfriends
- Malcolm D. Lee – The Best Man
- Rod Lurie† – Deterrence
- Kevin Macdonald – One Day in September
- Rob Marshall – Annie
- Theodore Melfi – Winding Roads
- Sam Mendes♦ – American Beauty
- Dave Meyers† – Foolish
- Mike Mitchell†♦ – Deuce Bigalow: Male Gigolo
- Daniel Myrick and Eduardo Sánchez – The Blair Witch Project
- Babak Payami – One More Day
- Kimberly Peirce† – Boys Don't Cry
- Lynne Ramsay – Ratcatcher
- David Raynr – Trippin'
- Tim Roth – The War Zone
- Shi Runjiu – A Beautiful New World
- Sara Sugarman† – Mad Cows
- S. J. Suryah – Vaalee
- Julie Taymor♦ – Titus
- Pablo Trapero† – Crane World
- Kinka Usher – Mystery Men
- Manuela Viegas – Gloria
- Chris Weitz and Paul Weitz – American Pie
- Kevin Williamson – Teaching Mrs. Tingle

=== 2000 ===
- Asia Argento♦ – Scarlet Diva
- Britt Allcroft – Thomas and the Magic Railroad
- Sean Baker – Four Letter Words
- Andrzej Bartkowiak† – Romeo Must Die
- Greg Berlanti – The Broken Hearts Club: A Romantic Comedy
- Thomas Bezucha – Big Eden
- Eric "Bibo" Bergeron and Don Paul – The Road to El Dorado
- Craig Brewer – The Poor & Hungry
- Jeffrey W. Byrd†♦ – Seventeen Again
- Reggie Rock Bythewood♦ – Dancing in September
- Steve Carr† – Next Friday
- Nigel Cole – Saving Grace
- Stephen Daldry† – Billy Elliot
- Paul Demeyer and Stig Bergqvist – Rugrats in Paris: The Movie
- Scott Derrickson – Hellraiser: Inferno
- Tom Dey – Shanghai Noon
- Andrew Dominik – Chopper
- Bill Eagles♦ – Beautiful Creatures
- Sally Field♦ – Beautiful
- Jonathan Glazer† – Sexy Beast
- David Gordon Green – George Washington
- Davis Guggenheim†♦ – Gossip
- Jon Gunn – Mercy Streets
- Bong Joon Ho – Barking Dogs Never Bite
- Bonnie Hunt – Return to Me
- Alejandro González Iñárritu†♦ – Amores perros
- Jack Johnson, Chris Malloy and Emmett Malloy – Thicker than Water
- Janusz Kamiński – Lost Souls
- Chris Koch♦ – Snow Day
- Baltasar Kormákur† – 101 Reykjavík
- Karyn Kusama – Girlfight
- Eric Leighton – Dinosaur (Note: Co-directed with Ralph Zondag)
- Kenneth Lonergan – You Can Count on Me
- Peter Lord† and Nick Park† – Chicken Run
- Samuel Maoz – Total Eclipse
- Joe Mantegna – Lakeboat
- McG† – Charlie's Angels
- David McNally – Coyote Ugly
- Christopher McQuarrie – The Way of the Gun
- Olivier Megaton†♦ – Exit
- Marzieh Meshkini – The Day I Became a Woman
- Brian Nissen – The Scarecrow (Note: Co-directed with Richard Rich)
- Edward Norton – Keeping the Faith
- Shane O'Sullivan – Second Generation
- Todd Phillips – Road Trip
- DJ Pooh – 3 Strikes
- Gina Prince-Bythewood† – Love & Basketball
- Peyton Reed†♦ – Bring It On
- Tarsem Singh† – The Cell
- Courtney Solomon – Dungeons & Dragons
- Robert Vince – MVP: Most Valuable Primate
- Apichatpong Weerasethakul† – Mysterious Object at Noon
- Matt Williams♦ – Where the Heart Is
- James Wong – Final Destination
- Kate Woods♦ – Looking for Alibrandi
- Takashi Yamazaki† – Juvenile
- Ben Younger – Boiler Room

=== 2001 ===
- Andrew Adamson† and Vicky Jenson† – Shrek
- Farhan Akhtar – Dil Chahta Hai
- Lisandro Alonso – La Libertad
- Steve Beck – Thirteen Ghosts
- Wang Chao – The Orphan of Anyang
- Michael Cuesta – L.I.E.
- Jeff Daniels – Escanaba in da Moonlight
- John A. Davis†♦ – Jimmy Neutron: Boy Genius
- Pete Docter† – Monsters, Inc.
- Jesse Dylan† – How High
- Jon Favreau♦ – Made
- Todd Field† – In the Bedroom
- Juan Carlos Fresnadillo† – Intacto
- Joel Gallen♦ – Not Another Teen Movie
- Lawrence Guterman† – Cats & Dogs
- Michel Gondry† – Human Nature
- Dennie Gordon†♦ – Joe Dirt
- Tom Green† – Freddy Got Fingered
- Gary Hardwick – The Brothers
- Ethan Hawke† – Chelsea Walls
- Blair Hayes – Bubble Boy
- Oliver Hirschbiegel♦ – Das Experiment
- Jeeva – 12B
- Clark Johnson♦ – Boycott
- Asif Kapadia† – The Warrior
- Semih Kaplanoğlu♦ – Herkes Kendi Evinde
- Abdellatif Kechiche – Poetical Refugee
- Richard Kelly† – Donnie Darko
- Christine Lahti† – My First Mister
- Yorgos Lanthimos†♦ – My Best Friend
- Jennifer Jason Leigh and Alan Cumming – The Anniversary Party
- Gonzalo López-Gallego†♦ – Nómadas
- Nick Love – Goodbye Charlie Bright
- Robert Luketic† – Legally Blonde
- Francine McDougall† – Sugar & Spice
- Lucky McKee and Chris Sivertson – All Cheerleaders Die
- Vanessa Middleton – 30 Years to Life
- John Cameron Mitchell – Hedwig and the Angry Inch
- John Moore† – Behind Enemy Lines
- Terry L. Noss – The Trumpet of the Swan (Note: Co-directed with Richard Rich)
- Bill Paxton† – Frailty
- Pitof – Vidocq
- Gregory Poitier – Tomcats
- S. S. Rajamouli – Student No: 1
- Juan Pablo Rebella and Pablo Stoll – 25 Watts
- J. B. Rogers – Say It Isn't So
- Motonori Sakakibara and Hironobu Sakaguchi – Final Fantasy: The Spirits Within
- Adam Shankman† – The Wedding Planner
- Chuck Sheetz – Recess: School's Out
- Anubhav Sinha†♦ – Tum Bin
- Tom Sito and Piet Kroon – Osmosis Jones (Note: Co-directed with Peter Farrelly and Bobby Farrelly)
- Paolo Sorrentino – One Man Up
- Chris Stokes† – House Party 4: Down to the Last Minute
- Michael Tollin♦† – Summer Catch
- David Wain†♦ – Wet Hot American Summer
- Daniel Waters – Happy Campers
- Ric Roman Waugh – In the Shadows

=== 2002 ===
- Jonas Åkerlund†♦ – Spun
- Kelly Asbury and Lorna Cook – Spirit: Stallion of the Cimarron
- Walt Becker – National Lampoon's Van Wilder
- Wang Bing – Tie Xi Qu: West of the Tracks
- Perry Andelin Blake – The Master of Disguise
- Jeffrey Blitz – Spellbound
- Kevin Bray† – All About the Benjamins
- Mark Brown – Two Can Play That Game
- Robin Budd and Donovan Cook – Return to Never Land
- Andrew Bujalski – Funny Ha Ha
- Neil Burger – Interview with the Assassin
- Nicolas Cage – Sonny
- Peter Care† – The Dangerous Lives of Altar Boys
- D. J. Caruso†♦ – The Salton Sea
- Lu Chuan – The Missing Gun
- George Clooney – Confessions of a Dangerous Mind
- James Cox† – Highway
- Damon Dash – Paper Soldiers (Note: Co-directed with David Daniel)
- Bob Dolman – The Banger Sisters
- Abbas Fahdel† – Back to Babylon
- Andy Fickman – Who's Your Daddy?
- Paul Goldman† – Australian Rules
- David S. Goyer – Zig Zag
- David Gumpel – Kermit's Swamp Years
- John Lee Hancock†♦ – The Rookie
- Peter Hastings – The Country Bears
- Christophe Honoré† – Seventeen Times Cecile Cassard
- Seth Kearsley – Eight Crazy Nights
- Callie Khouri – Divine Secrets of the Ya-Ya Sisterhood
- Janez Lapajne – Rustling Landscapes/Šelestenje
- Michael Lembeck♦ – The Santa Clause 2
- Louis Leterrier – The Transporter (Note: Co-directed with Corey Yuen)
- David Mackenzie†♦ – The Last Great Wilderness
- Julien Magnat† – Bloody Mallory
- Sophie Marceau – Speak to Me of Love
- Neil Marshall – Dog Soldiers
- Craig McCracken – The Powerpuff Girls Movie
- Jeff McGrath and Cathy Malkasian – The Wild Thornberrys Movie
- Cristian Mungiu† – Occident
- Mark Mylod♦ – Ali G Indahouse
- Mort Nathan – Boat Trip
- Dewey Nicks – Slackers
- José Padilha – Bus 174
- Don Michael Paul – Half Past Dead
- Marcus Raboy† – Friday After Next
- Carlos Reygadas† – Japan
- Eli Roth – Cabin Fever
- Anthony and Joe Russo – Welcome to Collinwood
- Chris Sanders and Dean DeBlois – Lilo & Stitch
- Robert Schwentke† – Tattoo
- John Stainton – The Crocodile Hunter: Collision Course
- Charles Stone III† – Drumline
- Yen Tan – Happy Birthday
- Kirk Thatcher – It's a Very Merry Muppet Christmas Movie
- Jeff Tremaine♦† – Jackass: The Movie
- Tuck Tucker – Hey Arnold!: The Movie
- Jesse Vaughan – Juwanna Mann
- Phil Vischer and Mike Nawrocki – Jonah: A VeggieTales Movie
- Denzel Washington – Antwone Fisher
- Chris Wedge – Ice Age
- Lydia Zimmermann – Aro Tolbukhin. En la mente del asesino

=== 2003 ===
- Yasmin Ahmad – Rabun
- Nimród Antal† – Kontroll
- Pablo Berger – Torremolinos 73
- Aaron Blaise and Robert Walker – Brother Bear
- LeVar Burton♦ – Blizzard
- Larry Charles – Masked and Anonymous
- Sylvain Chomet† – The Triplets of Belleville
- Richard Curtis – Love Actually
- Breck Eisner – Thoughtcrimes
- John Eng – Rugrats Go Wild (Note: Co-directed with Norton Virgien)
- Asghar Farhadi†♦ – Dancing in the Dust
- Paul Feig – I Am David
- Stephen Fry – Bright Young Things
- Patrick Gilmore – Sinbad: Legend of the Seven Seas (Note: Co-directed with Tim Johnson)
- Todd Graff – Camp
- Catherine Hardwicke – Thirteen
- John Robert Hoffman – Good Boy!
- Paul Hunter† – Bulletproof Monk
- Andrew Jarecki – Capturing the Friedmans
- Guy Jenkin♦ – The Sleeping Dictionary
- Patty Jenkins† – Monster
- Alex Kendrick – Flywheel
- Jonathan Liebesman† – Darkness Falls
- Greg Marcks† – 11:14
- Tom McCarthy – The Station Agent
- Linda Mendoza♦ – Chasing Papi
- Glen Morgan – Willard
- Marcus Nispel† – The Texas Chainsaw Massacre
- Vadim Perelman – House of Sand and Fog
- Kyle Rankin† – The Battle of Shaker Heights (Note: Co-directed with Efram Potelle)
- Billy Ray – Shattered Glass
- Chris Rock – Head of State
- The Spierig Brothers† – Undead
- Andrew Stanton♦† – Finding Nemo
- Steve Trenbirth – The Jungle Book 2
- Peter Webber – Girl with a Pearl Earring
- Bo Welch – The Cat in the Hat
- Tommy Wiseau – The Room
- Len Wiseman – Underworld
- Bille Woodruff – Honey
- Li Yang – Blind Shaft
- Rob Zombie – House of 1000 Corpses

=== 2004 ===
- Timothy Björklund – Teacher's Pet
- Zach Braff† – Garden State
- Tricia Brock† – Killer Diller
- Shane Carruth – Primer
- Henry Chan♦ – Gas
- Heitor Dhalia – Nina
- Saul Dibb♦ – Bullet Boy
- Charles S. Dutton♦ – Against the Ropes
- Christopher Erskin† – Johnson Family Vacation
- Daniel Espinosa† – Babylon Disease
- Jacob Aaron Estes – Mean Creek
- Ismaël Ferroukhi♦ – Le Grand Voyage
- Will Finn and John Sanford – Home on the Range
- Jenna Fischer – LolliLove
- Debra Granik† – Down to the Bone
- Robert Green Hall♦ – Lightning Bug
- Jonathan Hensleigh – The Punisher
- Jared Hess† – Napoleon Dynamite
- Stephen Hillenburg♦† – The SpongeBob SquarePants Movie
- Tom Hooper♦ – Red Dust
- Joseph Kahn† – Torque
- Rob Letterman – Shark Tale (Note: Co-directed with Vicky Jenson and Bibo Bergeron)
- Dolph Lundgren – The Defender
- Don Mancini – Seed of Chucky
- Joshua Marston – Maria Full of Grace
- Adam McKay♦ – Anchorman: The Legend of Ron Burgundy
- Pierre Morel – District B13
- Joe Nussbaum† – Sleepover
- Ruben Östlund† – The Guitar Mongoloid
- Chazz Palminteri – Noel
- Angela Robinson† – D.E.B.S.
- Rick Schroder – Black Cloud
- Makoto Shinkai – Beyond the Clouds, the Promised Place
- Cate Shortland♦ – Somersault
- Zack Snyder† – Dawn of the Dead
- Morgan Spurlock – Super Size Me
- Jessy Terrero† – Soul Plane
- Phil Tippett – Starship Troopers 2: Hero of the Federation
- Colin Trevorrow† – Reality Show
- Shih-Ching Tsou – Take Out
- Matthew Vaughn – Layer Cake
- Conrad Vernon – Shrek 2 (Note: Co-directed with Andrew Adamson and Kelly Asbury)
- James Wan – Saw
- Alexander Witt – Resident Evil: Apocalypse
- Masaaki Yuasa – Mind Game
- Yaron Zilberman – Watermarks

=== 2005 ===
- Vivek Agnihotri♦ – Chocolate
- Lexi Alexander† – Green Street
- Judd Apatow♦ – The 40-Year-Old Virgin
- Josh Appignanesi†♦ – Song of Songs
- Géla Babluani – 13 Tzameti
- Ramin Bahrani – Man Push Cart
- Steve Bendelack – The League of Gentlemen's Apocalypse
- Rémi Bezançon† – Ma vie en l'air
- Shane Black – Kiss Kiss Bang Bang
- Darren Lynn Bousman – Saw II
- Steve Box – Wallace & Gromit: The Curse of the Were-Rabbit (Note: Co-directed with Nick Park)
- Bruce Campbell – Man with the Screaming Brain
- Lee Shallat Chemel♦ – Greener Mountains
- Gary Chapman – Valiant
- Jaume Collet-Serra – House of Wax
- Lee Daniels – Shadowboxer
- Polly Draper – The Naked Brothers Band: The Movie
- Cory Edwards – Hoodwinked
- Bang Eun-jin – Princess Aurora
- John Gatins – Dreamer
- Crispin Glover – What Is It?
- Richard E. Grant – Wah-Wah
- Darren Grant† – Diary of a Mad Black Woman
- Luc Jacquet – March of the Penguins
- Nicholas Jarecki – The Oustider
- Vimukthi Jayasundara† – Sulanga Enu Pinisa
- Garth Jennings† – The Hitchhiker's Guide to the Galaxy
- Liu Jiayin – Oxhide
- Mike Johnson – Corpse Bride (Note: Co-directed with Tim Burton)
- Rian Johnson† – Brick
- Miranda July – Me and You and Everyone We Know
- Marc Klasfeld† – The L.A. Riot Spectacular
- Lajos Koltai – Fateless
- Francis Lawrence† – Constantine
- Tony Leondis – Lilo & Stitch 2: Stitch Has a Glitch
- Mark Levin – Little Manhattan
- Tom McGrath – Madagascar (Note: Co-directed with Eric Darnell)
- James McTeigue – V for Vendetta
- Brillante Mendoza – The Masseur
- Eduardo Mendoza de Echave – Mañana te cuento
- Frank Miller – Sin City (Note: Co-directed with Robert Rodriguez and Quentin Tarantino)
- Frank Nissen – Pooh's Heffalump Movie
- Ellen Perry♦ – The Fall of Fujimori
- Steven Quale† – Aliens of the Deep (Note: Co-directed with James Cameron)
- John de Rantau♦ – Mencari Madonna
- Oday Rasheed† – Underexposure
- Jason Reitman† – Thank You for Smoking
- James Ricardo – Opie Gets Laid
- Liev Schreiber – Everything is Illuminated
- Michael Showalter – The Baxter
- Marcos Siega† – Pretty Persuasion
- David Slade† – Hard Candy
- Joshua Michael Stern – Neverwas
- Susan Stroman – The Producers
- Tim Sullivan – 2001 Maniacs
- Joe Swanberg – Kissing on the Mouth
- Jeff Wadlow† – Cry Wolf
- Ti West† – The Roost
- Joss Whedon – Serenity
- Andrew Wilson and Luke Wilson – The Wendell Baker Story
- Joe Wright – Pride & Prejudice

=== 2006 ===
- J. J. Abrams♦ – Mission: Impossible III
- Joey Lauren Adams – Come Early Morning
- Elizabeth Allen† – Aquamarine
- Andrea Arnold† – Red Road
- Doug Atchison – Akeelah and the Bee
- Bryan Barber† – Idlewild
- Jessica Bendinger – Stick It
- Paul J. Bolger – Happily N'Ever After
- David Bowers and Sam Fell – Flushed Away
- Jonny Campbell – Alien Autopsy
- Laurie Collyer – Sherrybaby
- Trent Cooper† – Larry the Cable Guy: Health Inspector
- Ericson Core – Invincible
- Allen Coulter♦ – Hollywoodland
- Jill Culton – Open Season (Note: Co-directed with Roger Allers)
- Michael Damian†♦ – Hot Tamale
- Jonathan Dayton and Valerie Faris – Little Miss Sunshine
- Florian Henckel von Donnersmarck – The Lives of Others
- Ryan Fleck – Half Nelson
- Anne Fletcher – Step Up
- Jason Friedberg and Aaron Seltzer – Date Movie
- Liz Friedlander† – Take the Lead
- Jeff Garlin♦ – I Want Someone to Eat Cheese With
- James Gartner – Glory Road
- Susannah Grant† – Catch and Release
- Adam Green† – Hatchet
- James Gunn#†♦ – Slither
- Sanaa Hamri†♦ – Something New
- Michel Hazanavicius†♦ – OSS 117: Cairo, Nest of Spies
- Jody Hill – The Foot Fist Way
- Gil Kenan† – Monster House
- So Yong Kim – In Between Days
- Karey Kirkpatrick – Over the Hedge (Note: Co-directed with Tim Johnson)
- Jun Lana – Gigil
- Pablo Larraín – Fuga
- Jonathan Levine† – All the Boys Love Mandy Lane
- Claudia Llosa – Madeinusa
- Liam Lynch♦ – Tenacious D in The Pick of Destiny
- Steven C. Miller – Automaton Transfusion
- Goro Miyazaki – Tales from Earthsea
- Dominique Monfery – Franklin and the Turtle Lake Treasure
- Tan Chui Mui – Love Conquers All
- Ryan Murphy – Running with Scissors
- Mark Neveldine and Brian Taylor – Crank
- Matthew O'Callaghan† – Curious George
- Morgan O'Neill – Solo
- Mark Palansky† – Penelope
- Tyler Perry† – Madea's Family Reunion
- Brian Pimental – Bambi II
- Sarah Polley† – Away from Her
- James Ponsoldt† – Off the Black
- Joe Ranft – Cars (Note: Co-directed with John Lasseter)
- Christopher Reeve, Daniel St. Pierre, and Colin Brady – Everyone's Hero
- Stevan Riley♦ – Blue Blood
- Chris Robinson† – ATL
- Joachim Rønning† and Espen Sandberg† – Bandidas
- Carlos Saldanha – Ice Age: The Meltdown
- Ari Sandel† – Wild West Comedy Show: 30 Days and 30 Nights – Hollywood to the Heartland
- Lynn Shelton† – We Go Way Back
- Silambarasan† – Vallavan
- Joachim Trier† – Reprise
- Tom Vaughan† – Starter for 10
- Steve Williams – The Wild

=== 2007 ===
- Ben Affleck† – Gone Baby Gone
- Stephen J. Anderson† – Meet the Robinsons
- J. A. Bayona – El Orfanato
- Ash Brannon – Surf's Up (Note: Co-directed with Chris Buck)
- Anton Corbijn† – Control
- Rodrigo Cortés† – The Contestant
- Gábor Csupó – Bridge to Terabithia
- Michael Dougherty† – Trick 'r Treat
- Fred Durst† – The Education of Charlie Banks
- Quentin Dupieux†♦ – Steak
- Alison Eastwood – Rails & Ties
- Charles Ferguson – No End in Sight
- Scott Frank – The Lookout
- Stephane Gauger – Owl and the Sparrow
- Sarah Gavron†♦ – Brick Lane
- Craig Gillespie – Mr. Woodcock
- Tony Gilroy – Michael Clayton
- Seth Gordon†♦ – The King of Kong
- Mark Helfrich – Good Luck Chuck
- Zach Helm – Mr. Magorium's Wonder Emporium
- Helen Hunt♦ – Then She Found Me
- Olivier Jean-Marie – Go West! A Lucky Luke Adventure
- Angelina Jolie – A Place in Time
- Michael Katleman♦ – Primeval
- Nadine Labaki – Caramel
- Matt Maiellaro and Dave Willis – Aqua Teen Hunger Force Colon Movie Film for Theaters
- Mary Stuart Masterson♦ – The Cake Eaters
- Chris Miller – Shrek the Third
- Jan Pinkava – Ratatouille (Note: Co-directed with Brad Bird)
- Marjane Satrapi and Vincent Paronnaud – Persepolis
- Jeremy Saulnier† – Murder Party
- Fred Savage♦ – Daddy Day Camp
- Akiva Schaffer†♦ – Hot Rod
- Rob Schneider – Big Stan
- David Schwimmer – Run Fatboy Run
- Cai Shangjun – The Red Awn
- David Silverman†♦ — The Simpsons Movie
- Simon J. Smith – Bee Movie (Note: Co-directed with Steve Hickner)
- Will Speck and Josh Gordon – Blades of Glory
- Greg and Colin Strause – Aliens vs. Predator: Requiem
- Justin Theroux – Dedication
- Patricia Riggen† – Under the Same Moon
- Deon Taylor – Dead Tone (Note: Co-directed with Brian Hooks)
- Jim Threapleton – Extraordinary Rendition
- Stuart Townsend – Battle in Seattle
- Dylan Verrechia – Tijuana Makes Me Happy
- David Wall – Noëlle
- Taika Waititi† – Eagle vs Shark
- Adam Wingard† – Home Sick
- Tommy Wirkola† – Kill Buljo
- Craig Zobel† – Great World of Sound

=== 2008 ===
- Marc Abraham – Flash of Genius
- Kent Alterman – Semi-Pro
- Guillermo Arriaga† – The Burning Plain
- Daniel Barnz† – Phoebe in Wonderland
- Bryan Bertino – The Strangers
- Eric Brevig – Journey to the Center of the Earth
- Anna Boden† – Sugar (Note: Co-directed with Ryan Fleck)
- Antonio Campos† – Afterschool
- Fred Cavayé† – Anything for Her
- Jon M. Chu† – Step Up 2: The Streets
- Noel Clarke – Adulthood
- Kirk DeMicco – Space Chimps
- Elissa Down† – The Black Balloon
- Diane English – The Women
- Jennifer Flackett – Nim's Island
- Sacha Gervasi – Anvil! The Story of Anvil
- Greta Gerwig – Nights and Weekends
- David Hackl – Saw V
- Jimmy Hayward and Steve Martino – Horton Hears a Who!
- Joanna Hogg♦ – Unrelated
- Peggy Holmes – The Little Mermaid: Ariel's Beginning
- Na Hong-jin – The Chaser
- Jon Hurwitz and Hayden Schlossberg – Harold & Kumar Escape from Guantanamo Bay
- Barry Jenkins† – Medicine for Melancholy
- Charlie Kaufman – Synecdoche, New York
- Michael Patrick King – Sex and the City
- Madonna – Filth and Wisdom
- Michael McCullers† – Baby Mama
- Martin McDonagh† – In Bruges
- Steve McQueen† – Hunger
- Edward Neumeier – Starship Troopers 3: Marauder
- David Oliveras – Watercolors
- Nina Paley – Sita Sings the Blues
- Marianna Palka – Good Dick
- Lori Petty† – The Poker House
- Natalie Portman† – New York, I Love You
- Johan Renck† – Downloading Nancy
- Alex Rivera† – Sleep Dealer
- Josh Safdie† – The Pleasure of Being Robbed
- Marco Schnabel – The Love Guru
- Steven Sebring – Patti Smith: Dream of Life
- Amy Seimetz – We Saw Such Things
- Ben Stassen – Fly Me to the Moon
- Robert Stevenhagen – The Tale of Despereaux (Note: Co-directed with Sam Fell)
- John Stevenson and Mark Osborne – Kung Fu Panda
- Nicholas Stoller♦ – Forgetting Sarah Marshall
- Tate Taylor† – Pretty Ugly People
- Mark Tonderai – Hush
- James Watkins – Eden Lake
- Chris Williams and Byron Howard – Bolt
- George C. Wolfe – Nights in Rodanthe
- Rupert Wyatt – The Escapist

=== 2009 ===
- Shane Acker† – 9
- Zoya Akhtar – Luck by Chance
- Drew Barrymore – Whip It
- Peter Billingsley† – Couples Retreat
- Jorge Blanco† – Planet 51
- Neill Blomkamp† – District 9
- Benny Boom† – Next Day Air
- Damien Chazelle – Guy and Madeline on a Park Bench
- Scott Cooper – Crazy Heart
- Peter Cornwell – The Haunting in Connecticut
- Matt Crouch – The Cross
- Juan Delancer – Trópico de Sangre
- James DeMonaco – Staten Island
- Xavier Dolan – I Killed My Mother
- Adam Elliot† – Mary and Max
- Gareth Evans – Merantau
- Shana Feste† – The Greatest
- David Field – The Combination
- Ruben Fleischer†♦ – Zombieland
- Tom Ford – A Single Man
- Thor Freudenthal† – Hotel for Dogs
- Cary Joji Fukunaga† – Sin Nombre
- Ricky Gervais♦ – The Invention of Lying (Note: Co-directed with Matthew Robinson)
- Will Gluck – Fired Up!
- Kevin Greutert – Saw VI
- Manish Gupta – The Stoneman Murders
- Andrew Haigh♦ – Greek Pete
- Klay Hall – Tinker Bell and the Lost Treasure
- Melora Hardin – You
- Tom Harper♦† – The Scouting Book for Boys
- Cheryl Hines – Serious Moonlight
- Armando Iannucci♦ – In the Loop
- Michael Imperioli† – The Hungry Ghosts
- Craig Johnson – True Adolescents
- Duncan Jones† – Moon
- Adam Kane†♦ – Formosa Betrayed
- James Kerwin† – Yesterday Was a Lie
- Paul King♦ – Bunny and the Bull
- Takeshi Koike♦ – Redline
- Kishore Kumar – Konchem Ishtam Konchem Kashtam
- Phil Lord and Christopher Miller – Cloudy with a Chance of Meatballs
- Scott Mann†♦ – The Tournament
- Jodie Markell – The Loss of a Teardrop Diamond
- Trevor Moore and Zach Cregger – Miss March
- Oren Moverman – The Messenger
- Ayan Mukerji – Wake Up Sid
- Shirin Neshat† – Women Without Men
- Alex Ross Perry† – Impolex
- Bob Peterson – Up (Note: Co-directed with Pete Docter)
- John Requa and Glenn Ficarra – I Love You Phillip Morris
- James Ricardo – Opie Gets Laid
- Benny Safdie† – Daddy Longlegs
- Adam Salky† – Dare
- Aaron Schneider – Get Low
- Steve Shill♦ – Obsessed
- Robert Siegel – Big Fan
- Tom Six – The Human Centipede (First Sequence)
- Michael Stephenson† – Best Worst Movie
- Peter Strickland – Katalin Varga
- Suseenthiran – Vennila Kabadi Kuzhu
- Kevin Tancharoen – Fame
- Sooni Taraporevala – Little Zizou
- Sam Taylor-Johnson† – Nowhere Boy
- Phil Traill†♦ – All About Steve
- Nia Vardalos – I Hate Valentine's Day
- Malcolm Venville†♦ – 44 Inch Chest
- Damien Dante Wayans – Dance Flick
- Marc Webb† – (500) Days of Summer
- Jiang Wenli – Lan
- Ben Wheatley†♦ – Down Terrace
- Hoyt Yeatman – G-Force
- Suzi Yoonessi – Dear Lemon Lima

=== 2010 ===
- Casey Affleck – I'm Still Here
- Mo Ali – Shank
- Tim Allen♦ – Crazy on the Outside
- Richard Ayoade† – Submarine
- Banksy – Exit Through the Gift Shop
- Samuel Bayer† – A Nightmare on Elm Street
- S. J. Clarkson♦ – Toast
- Jason Croot – Le Fear
- Brendon Culliton – If I Should Fall
- Jim Cummings† – No Floodwall Here
- Vincent D'Onofrio – Don't Go in the Woods
- Gareth Edwards♦† – Monsters
- Nathan Greno – Tangled (Note: Co-directed with Byron Howard)
- Tanya Hamilton† – Night Catches Us
- Philip Seymour Hoffman – Jack Goes Boating
- Rowan Joffé♦ – Brighton Rock
- Henry Joost and Ariel Schulman – Catfish
- Larysa Kondracki – The Whistleblower
- Joseph Kosinski – Tron: Legacy
- Wang Leehom – Love in Disguise
- William Monahan – London Boulevard
- David Michôd† – Animal Kingdom
- Ben Miller – Huge
- David Robert Mitchell – The Myth of the American Sleepover
- Chris Morris – Four Lions
- Daisuke Namikawa – Wonderful World
- Troy Nixey† – Don't Be Afraid of the Dark
- Brad Peyton† – Cats & Dogs: The Revenge of Kitty Galore
- Josh Radnor – happythankyoumoreplease
- Daina Reid♦† – I Love You Too
- Chris Renaud† and Pierre Coffin† – Despicable Me
- Julie Anne Robinson♦ – The Last Song
- Joann Sfar – Gainsbourg: A Heroic Life
- Maneesh Sharma – Wedding Planners
- Floria Sigismondi† – The Runaways
- Jim Field Smith† – She's Out of My League
- Jonathan Sobol† – A Beginner's Guide to Endings
- Scott Stewart† – Legion
- Massy Tadjedin – Last Night
- Lee Unkrich – Toy Story 3
- Vega brothers – October
- John Wells♦ – The Company Men
- Erik White† – Lottery Ticket
- Max Winkler† – Ceremony
- Hiromasa Yonebayashi – The Secret World of Arrietty

=== 2011 ===
- Salim Akil♦ – Jumping the Broom
- Alex and Martin – The Incident
- James Bobin♦† – The Muppets
- Mike Cahill – Another Earth
- Cedric the Entertainer – Dance Fu
- J. C. Chandor – Margin Call
- Paddy Considine† – Tyrannosaur
- Joe Cornish♦† – Attack the Block
- Simon Curtis♦ – My Week with Marilyn
- Adam Deacon – Anuvahood
- Mike Disa – Hoodwinked Too! Hood vs. Evil
- Sean Durkin† – Martha Marcy May Marlene
- Fabrice Eboué – Case départ (Note: Co-directed with Lionel Steketee and Thomas N'Gijol)
- Vera Farmiga – Higher Ground
- Mike Flanagan – Absentia
- Dexter Fletcher – Wild Bill
- Evan Glodell – Bellflower
- Drew Goddard – The Cabin in the Woods
- Don Hall – Winnie the Pooh (Note: Co-directed with Stephen Anderson)
- Famke Janssen – Bringing Up Bobby
- Giddens Ko – You Are the Apple of My Eye
- Justin Kurzel – The Snowtown Murders
- Julia Leigh – Sleeping Beauty
- Brad Lewis – Cars 2 (Note: Co-directed with John Lasseter)
- Yonah Lewis and Calvin Thomas – Amy George
- Niall MacCormick♦ – Albatross
- Victoria Mahoney† – Yelling to the Sky
- John Michael McDonagh – The Guard
- Dermot Mulroney – Love, Wedding, Marriage
- Nick Murphy♦ – The Awakening
- Jennifer Yuh Nelson – Kung Fu Panda 2
- George Nolfi – The Adjustment Bureau
- Ben Palmer♦† – The Inbetweeners Movie
- Michael Rapaport♦ – Beats, Rhymes & Life: The Travels of A Tribe Called Quest
- Dee Rees† – Pariah
- Keith Scholey – African Cats (Note: Co-directed with Alastair Fothergill)
- Taylor Sheridan† – Vile
- Sarah Smith – Arthur Christmas (Note: Co-directed with Barry Cook)
- Jason Winer† – Arthur

=== 2012 ===
- Mark Andrews and Steve Purcell – Brave (Note: Co-directed with Brenda Chapman)
- Rodney Ascher♦† – Room 237
- Kyle Balda – The Lorax (Note: Co-directed with Chris Renaud)
- Paolo Benetazzo† – Study
- Matt Bettinelli-Olpin and Tyler Gillett – V/H/S
- Stuart Blumberg – Thanks for Sharing
- Chris Butler – ParaNorman (Note: Co-directed with Sam Fell)
- Destin Daniel Cretton – I Am Not a Hipster
- Ciarán Foy – Citadel
- Adrian Grünberg – Get the Gringo
- Anthony Hemingway♦ – Red Tails
- Vincent Kesteloot – A Turtle's Tale 2: Sammy's Escape from Paradise
- Don Hertzfeldt – It's Such a Beautiful Day
- Dustin Hoffman – Quartet
- Brian Klugman – The Words
- Joanna Lombardi – In House
- Robert Lorenz – Trouble with the Curve
- Seth MacFarlane♦† – Ted
- Daigo Matsui – Afro Tanaka
- Alonso Mayo† – The Story of Luke
- Jason Moore♦ – Pitch Perfect
- Rich Moore♦ – Wreck-It Ralph
- Usher Morgan† – The Thought Exchange
- Lucy Mulloy♦ – Una Noche
- Mamoru Nagano – Gothicmade
- Jeff Newitt – The Pirates! Band of Misfits (Note: Co-directed with Peter Lord)
- Nima Nourizadeh† – Project X
- Gabe Polsky – The Motel Life
- Kazik Radwanski – Tower
- Peter Ramsey – Rise of the Guardians
- Benjamin Renner – Ernest & Celestine
- RZA – The Man with the Iron Fists
- Adrián Saba† – The Cleaner
- Rupert Sanders† – Snow White and the Huntsman
- Lorene Scafaria – Seeking a Friend for the End of the World
- Josh Schwartz – Fun Size
- Stefano Sollima♦† – ACAB – All Cops Are Bastards
- Scott Speer† – Step Up Revolution
- Genndy Tartakovsky♦ – Hotel Transylvania
- Michael Thurmeier – Ice Age: Continental Drift (Note: Co-directed with Steve Martino)
- Josh Trank♦ – Chronicle
- Scott Waugh† – Act of Valor (Note: Co-directed with Mike McCoy)
- Michael Whitton – Exit Strategy
- Benh Zeitlin – Beasts of the Southern Wild
- Xu Zheng – Lost in Thailand

=== 2013 ===
- Fede Álvarez† – Evil Dead
- Jason Bateman♦ – Bad Words
- Ritesh Batra† – The Lunchbox
- Lake Bell† – In a World...
- Lawrie Brewster† – Lord of Tears
- Cal Brunker – Escape from Planet Earth
- James Ward Byrkit – Coherence
- Maggie Carey† – The To Do List
- Ryan Coogler† – Fruitvale Station
- Jeremy Degruson – The House of Magic
- Nat Faxon and Jim Rash – The Way, Way Back
- Liz W. Garcia – The Lifeguard
- Simple Gogoi – Tumi Jodi Kuwa
- Joseph Gordon-Levitt – Don Jon
- Josh Greenbaum – The Short Game
- Dave Grohl – Sound City
- Naomi Foner Gyllenhaal – Very Good Girls
- Jerusha Hess – Austenland
- Eliza Hittman† – It Felt Like Love
- Ha Jung-woo – Fasten Your Seatbelt
- Bilal Lashari – Waar
- Michelle Latimer† – Alias
- Jennifer Lee – Frozen (Note: Co-directed with Chris Buck)
- Damien Leone† – All Hallows' Eve
- Dan Mazer† – I Give It a Year
- B. J. McDonnell – Hatchet III
- Andy Muschietti† – Mama
- Randy Moore – Escape from Tomorrow
- Cody Cameron and Kris Pearn – Cloudy with a Chance of Meatballs 2
- Keanu Reeves – Man of Tai Chi
- Carl Rinsch† – 47 Ronin
- Seth Rogen and Evan Goldberg – This Is the End
- Dan Scanlon – Monsters University
- Joey Soloway – Afternoon Delight
- David Soren♦† – Turbo
- Jayson Thiessen♦ – My Little Pony: Equestria Girls
- Michael Tiddes – A Haunted House
- Jocelyn Towne – I Am I
- Zhao Wei – So Young

=== 2014 ===
- Ana Lily Amirpour – A Girl Walks Home Alone at Night
- Anthony Stacchi and Graham Annable – The Boxtrolls (Note: Co-directed with Anthony Stacchi)
- Wes Ball† – The Maze Runner
- Paul Bettany – Shelter
- Nick Cheung – Ghost Rituals
- Shawn Christensen – Before I Disappear
- David Cross♦ – Hits
- Russell Crowe – The Water Diviner
- Sam Esmail†♦ – Comet
- Chris Evans – Before We Go
- Mona Fastvold – The Sleepwalker
- Susanna Fogel♦ – Life Partners
- Bobs Gannaway – Planes: Fire & Rescue
- Alex Garland – Ex Machina
- Dan Gilroy – Nightcrawler
- Akiva Goldsman♦ – Winter's Tale
- Ryan Gosling – Lost River
- Dave Green – Earth to Echo
- Jorge R. Gutierrez† – The Book of Life
- Andy Hamilton♦ – What We Did on Our Holiday (Note: Co-directed with Guy Jenkin)
- Han Han – Duckweed
- Simon Helberg – We'll Never Have Paris (Note: Co-directed with Jocelyn Towne)
- Gekidan Hitori – A Bolt from the Blue
- Gerard Johnstone♦ – Housebound
- July Jung – A Girl at My Door
- Jennifer Kent† – The Babadook
- Kevin Kölsch and Dennis Widmyer – Starry Eyes
- Peter Lepeniotis – The Nut Job
- Grégory Levasseur – The Pyramid
- Adam MacDonald – Backcountry
- William H. Macy♦ – Rudderless
- Charlie McDowell – The One I Love
- Chris Messina – Alex of Venice
- Wally Pfister – Transcendence
- Nabeel Qureshi♦ – Na Maloom Afraad
- Mark Raso† – Copenhagen
- Peter Sattler – Camp X-Ray
- Tristram Shapeero♦† – Merry Friggin' Christmas
- Gary Shore† – Dracula Untold
- Chen Sicheng – Beijing Love Story
- Justin Simien† – Dear White People
- Chad Stahelski – John Wick
- Riley Stearns – Faults
- Jon Stewart – Rosewater
- Robert Stromberg – Maleficent
- Rob Thomas♦ – Veronica Mars
- Kazuo Umezu – Mother
- Lulu Wang† – Posthumous
- Jon Watts† – Clown
- Gren Wells – The Road Within
- Michael Williams† – Ozland
- David Yarovesky† – The Hive

=== 2015 ===
- Aleksander Bach – Hitman: Agent 47
- Elizabeth Banks† – Pitch Perfect 2
- Jawad Bashir – Maya
- Scott Beck and Bryan Woods – Nightlight
- Natalie Bible' – Windsor Drive
- Mark Burton and Richard Starzak – Shaun the Sheep Movie
- Stephen Campanelli – Momentum
- Robert Carlyle♦ – The Legend of Barney Thomson
- Ronnie del Carmen – Inside Out
- Don Cheadle♦ – Miles Ahead
- Etan Cohen – Get Hard
- Marya Cohn† – The Girl in the Book
- Dennis Cooper and Zac Farley – Like Cattle Towards Glow
- Brady Corbet† – The Childhood of a Leader
- John Francis Daley† and Jonathan Goldstein† – Vacation
- Stephen Dunn† – Closet Monster
- Momina Duraid♦ – Bin Roye
- Ian Edelman – Puerto Ricans in Paris
- Joel Edgerton† – The Gift
- Robert Eggers♦† – The Witch
- David Feiss – Open Season: Scared Silly
- Drew Fortier† – Attack of Life: The Bang Tango Movie
- Bi Gan† – Kaili Blues
- Neeraj Ghaywan† – Masaan
- Tom Gianas and Ross Shuman – Hell and Back
- Aaron Hann and Mario Miscione – Circle
- Marielle Heller – The Diary of a Teenage Girl
- Anna Rose Holmer† – The Fits
- Raman Hui – Monster Hunt
- Dean Israelite†♦ – Project Almanac
- Vahid Jalilvand – Wednesday, May 9
- Yasir Jaswal – Jalaibee
- Kahlil Joseph† – The Reflektor Tapes
- Ariel Kleiman† – Partisan
- Gonzalo Ladines† – Just Like in the Movies
- Luo Luo – The Last Women Standing
- John Maclean† – Slow West
- Reed Morano – Meadowland
- Ilya Naishuller† – Hardcore Henry
- László Nemes – Son of Saul
- Jarrad Paul – The D Train
- J. G. Quintel♦† – Regular Show: The Movie
- R. Ravikumar – Indru Netru Naalai
- Meg Ryan – Ithaca
- Gary Rydstrom – Strange Magic
- Amit Sharma – Tevar
- Trey Edward Shults† – Krisha
- Peter Sohn – The Good Dinosaur
- Austin Stark† – The Runner
- Alec Su – The Left Ear
- Paul Tibbitt♦ – The SpongeBob Movie: Sponge Out of Water
- James Vanderbilt – Truth
- Director X†♦ – Across the Line
- S. Craig Zahler – Bone Tomahawk
- Chloé Zhao – Songs My Brothers Taught Me

=== 2016 ===
- Wang Baoqiang – Buddies in India
- Alessandro Carloni – Kung Fu Panda 3 (Note: Co-directed with Jennifer Yuh Nelson)
- Yarrow Cheney† – The Secret Life of Pets (Note: Co-directed with Chris Renaud)
- Galen T. Chu – Ice Age: Collision Course (Note: Co-directed with Michael Thurmeier)
- Isaac Halasima† – The Last Descent
- Kelly Fremon Craig† – The Edge of Seventeen
- The Daniels – Swiss Army Man
- Garth Davis† – Lion
- Walt Dohrn♦† – Trolls (Note: Co-directed with Mike Mitchell)
- Julia Ducournau† – Raw
- Anna Foerster – Underworld: Blood Wars
- Katie Holmes – All We Had
- Michelle Johnston – A Cinderella Story: If the Shoe Fits
- Clay Kaytis and Fergal Reilly – The Angry Birds Movie
- Travis Knight – Kubo and the Two Strings
- Gee Malik Linton† – Exposed (Note: As Declan Dale)
- Avid Liongoren – Saving Sally
- Christophe Lourdelet – Sing (Note: Co-directed with Garth Jennings)
- Alice Lowe† – Prevenge
- Ashley McKenzie† – Werewolf
- Tim Miller – Deadpool
- Bob Nelson – The Confirmation
- Cedric Nicolas-Troyan† – The Huntsman: Winter's War
- William Oldroyd† – Lady Macbeth
- Tony Olmos† – South of 8
- Joaquin del Paso† – Panamerican Machinery
- Asim Raza♦ – Ho Mann Jahaan
- Nizam Razak♦† – BoBoiBoy: The Movie
- Matthew Ross† – Frank & Lola
- David F. Sandberg♦† – Lights Out
- Luke Scott♦† – Morgan
- Jamal Shah – Revenge of the Worthless
- Konkona Sen Sharma† – A Death in the Gunj
- Veena Sud♦† – The Salton Sea
- Doug Sweetland† – Storks (Note: Co-directed with Nicholas Stoller)
- Amber Tamblyn – Paint It Black
- Richard Tanne – Southside with You
- Greg Tiernan♦† – Sausage Party (Note: Co-directed with Conrad Vernon)
- Dan Trachtenberg♦† – 10 Cloverfield Lane

=== 2017 ===
- Ana Asensio – Most Beautiful Island
- Jay Baruchel – Goon: Last of the Enforcers
- Charlie Bean, Paul Fisher, and Bob Logan – The Lego Ninjago Movie
- Kristoffer Borgli – DRIB
- Antoine Bourges† – Fail to Appear
- Óscar Catacora – Eternity
- Dean Devlin♦ – Geostorm
- Coralie Fargeat – Revenge
- Brian Fee – Cars 3
- Cory Finley – Thoroughbreds
- Andrew Getty – The Evil Within
- Michael Gracey – The Greatest Showman
- Eric Guillon – Despicable Me 3 (Note: Co-directed with Pierre Coffin and Kyle Balda)
- Jason Hall – Thank You for Your Service
- Kathleen Hepburn – Never Steady, Never Still
- Taran Killam – Killing Gunther
- Brie Larson† – Unicorn Store
- David Leitch† – Atomic Blonde
- Taron Lexton† – In Search of Fellini
- Dave McCary♦† – Brigsby Bear
- Molly McGlynn† – Mary Goes Round
- Chris McKay – The Lego Batman Movie
- Hallie Meyers-Shyer – Home Again
- Adrian Molina – Coco (Note: Co-directed with Lee Unkrich)
- Usama Mukwaya – Love Faces
- Denise Di Novi♦ – Unforgettable
- Jordan Peele – Get Out
- Timothy Reckart – The Star
- Andy Serkis – Breathe
- Quinn Shephard† – Blame
- Kevin Sorbo♦ – Let There Be Light
- Aaron Sorkin – Molly's Game
- Jessica M. Thompson – The Light of the Moon
- Oren Uziel – Shimmer Lake

=== 2018 ===
- Ari Aster† – Hereditary
- Bo Burnham† – Eighth Grade
- Kay Cannon – Blockers
- Aneesh Chaganty† – Searching
- Bradley Cooper – A Star Is Born
- Paul Dano – Wildlife
- Steven S. DeKnight♦ – Pacific Rim Uprising
- Carlos López Estrada – Blindspotting
- Nicolai Fuglsig – 12 Strong
- Karen Gillan† – The Party's Just Beginning
- Heather Graham – Half Magic
- Reinaldo Marcus Green†♦ – Monsters and Men
- Christian Gudegast – Den of Thieves
- Jonah Hill† – Mid90s
- Aaron Horvath – Teen Titans Go! To the Movies
- Mag Hsu† and Hsu Chih-yen† – Dear Ex
- Chris Jenkins – Duck Duck Goose
- Phil Johnston† – Ralph Breaks the Internet (Note: Co-directed with Rich Moore)
- Arunraja Kamaraj – Kanaa
- Anthony Mandler† – Monster
- Anthony Maras – Hotel Mumbai
- William McGregor♦† – Gwen
- Mike Mort – Chuck Steel: Night of the Trampires
- Scott Mosier – The Grinch (Note: Co-directed with Yarrow Cheney)
- Mari Okada† – Maquia: When the Promised Flower Blooms
- Bob Persichetti and Rodney Rothman – Spider-Man: Into the Spider-Verse (Note: Co-directed with Peter Ramsey)
- Alex Pettyfer† – Back Roads
- Boots Riley† – Sorry to Bother You
- Christian Rivers – Mortal Engines
- Jared Stern†♦ – Happy Anniversary
- Jeff Tomsic†♦ – Tag
- Jonathan Watson – Arizona

=== 2019 ===
- Dianna Agron, Justin Franklin, Daniel Lwowski, and Gabriela Tscherniak – Berlin, I Love You (Note: Co-directed with Peter Chelsom, Fernando Eimbcke, Dennis Gansel, Dani Levy, Josef Rusnak, Til Schweiger, and Massy Tadjedin)
- Mike Ahern and Edna Loughman – Extra Ordinary
- Annabelle Attanasio – Mickey and the Bear
- Andrea Berloff – The Kitchen
- Robin Bissell – The Best of Enemies
- Dylan Brown – Wonder Park
- Nick Bruno and Troy Quane – Spies in Disguise
- Matthew Michael Carnahan – Mosul
- Michael Chaves♦† – The Curse of La Llorona
- Monia Chokri – A Brother's Love
- Josh Cooley† – Toy Story 4
- Michael Angelo Covino† – The Climb
- Gary Dauberman – Annabelle Comes Home
- Carlo Mirabella Davis – Swallow
- Roxann Dawson♦ – Breakthrough
- Mati Diop – Atlantics
- Lino DiSalvo – Playmobil: The Movie
- Nora Fingscheidt – System Crasher
- Micah Gallo† – Itsy Bitsy
- Mike Gan – Burn
- Rose Glass† – Saint Maud
- Rachel Griffiths†♦ – Ride Like a Girl
- Jiaozi† – Ne Zha
- Simon Kinberg – Dark Phoenix
- Lars Klevberg† – Child's Play
- Van Ling – Cliffs of Freedom
- Ladj Ly – Les Misérables
- Gail Mancuso♦ – A Dog's Journey
- Melina Matsoukas†♦ – Queen & Slim
- Adam Egypt Mortimer♦† – Daniel Isn't Real
- Wagner Moura – Marighella
- Shannon Murphy – Babyteeth
- Tyler Nilson and Michael Schwartz – The Peanut Butter Falcon
- Katharine O'Brien† – Lost Transmissions
- Thurop Van Orman – The Angry Birds Movie 2
- Sergio Pablos – Klaus
- Andrew Patterson† – The Vast of Night
- Joe Penna♦† – Arctic
- Richard Phelan and Will Becher – A Shaun the Sheep Movie: Farmageddon
- Tayarisha Poe♦† – Selah and the Spades
- Halina Reijn – Instinct
- Annie Silverstein – Bull
- Grant Sputore† – I Am Mother
- Gene Stupnitsky† – Good Boys
- Joe Talbot† – The Last Black Man in San Francisco
- Emma Tammi – The Wind
- Michael Tyburski – The Sound of Silence
- Jonathan del Val – The Secret Life of Pets 2 (Note: Co-directed with Chris Renaud)
- Viktor van der Valk – Nocturne
- Olivia Wilde – Booksmart
- Phillip Youmans – Burning Cane
- Usamah Zaid Yasin♦ – Ejen Ali The Movie

=== 2020 ===
- Max Barbakow – Palm Springs
- Halle Berry – Bruised
- Gerard Bush and Christopher Renz – Antebellum
- Brian Patrick Butler† – Friend of the World
- Tony Cervone♦ – Scoob!
- Dean Craig† – Love Wedding Repeat
- Joel Crawford† – The Croods: A New Age
- Jack Danini† – Ode to Passion
- Eric D. Cabello Diaz – El Camino de Xico
- Emerald Fennell† – Promising Young Woman
- Michael Fimognari† – To All the Boys: P.S. I Still Love You
- Will Forbes – John Henry
- Jeff Fowler† – Sonic the Hedgehog
- Edward Hall♦† – Blithe Spirit
- Sam Hargrave† – Extraction
- Chris Henchy† – Impractical Jokers: The Movie
- David Henrie† – This Is the Year
- Natalie Erika James† – Relic
- Anthony Jerjen† – Inherit the Viper
- Aneil Karia♦† – Surge
- Glen Keane – Over the Moon
- Regina King♦† – One Night in Miami...
- Natalie Krinsky – The Broken Hearts Gallery
- Patrice Laliberté♦† – The Decline
- John Leguizamo – Critical Thinking
- Rob Lodermeier – The Willoughbys
- Pedro Flores Maldonado♦† – Sí, mi amor
- Viggo Mortensen – Falling
- Malik Nejer♦ – Masameer: The Movie
- Jekaterina Oertel – DAU. Natasha
- Prentice Penny♦† – Uncorcked
- David Prior† – The Empty Man
- Emma Seligman† – Shiva Baby
- Tomotaka Shibayama – A Whisker Away
- Remi Weekes♦ – His House
- Autumn de Wilde† – Emma
- David S. F. Wilson† – Bloodshot
- Florian Zeller♦ – The Father

=== 2021 ===
- Chris Appelhans – Wish Dragon
- Elaine Bogan♦ – Spirit Untamed
- Mika Boorem† – Hollywood.Con
- Paul Briggs and John Ripa – Raya and the Last Dragon
- Laura Brousseau and Kevin Pavlovic – The Addams Family 2
- Jonathan Butterell – Everybody's Talking About Jamie
- Enrico Casarosa – Luca
- Tito Catacora – Pakucha
- Victor Checa† – The Shape of Things to Come
- Ryan Crego♦ – Arlo the Alligator Boy
- Ángeles Cruz♦ – Nudo Mixteco
- Bakhtyar Fatah♦ – 09
- Hamish Grieve† – Rumble
- Maggie Gyllenhaal♦ – The Lost Daughter
- Rebecca Hall – Passing
- Brandon Jeffords – Vivo
- Lisa Joy♦ – Reminiscence
- Fran Kranz – Mass
- Johane Matte, Francisco Ruiz Velasco, and Andrew L. Schmidt – Trollhunters: Rise of the Titans
- PJ McCabe – The Beta Test (Note: Co-directed with Jim Cummings)
- Simon McQuoid – Mortal Kombat
- Brian Andrew Mendoza – Sweet Girl
- Lin-Manuel Miranda – Tick, Tick... Boom!
- Edson Oda – Nine Days
- Rodrigo Perez-Castro – Koati
- Mike Rianda – The Mitchells vs. the Machines
- Alessandra de Rossi – My Amanda
- Carlos Santos♦ – Chilangolandia
- Matthew J. Saville – Juniper
- Rodo Sayagues – Don't Breathe 2
- Evan Spiliotopoulos – The Unholy
- Liesl Tommy♦ – Respect
- Mattson Tomlin – Mother/Android
- Jean-Philippe Vine – Ron's Gone Wrong (Note: Directed with Sarah Smith)
- Jude Weng – Finding 'Ohana
- Robin Wright♦ – Land
- Steve Yamamoto – Monster Hunter: Legends of the Guild
- Carlson Young – The Blazing World

=== 2022 ===
- Loren Bouchard♦ and Bernard Derriman♦ – The Bob's Burgers Movie
- Michelle Garza Cervera – Huesera: The Bone Woman
- Mike Cheslik – Hundreds of Beavers
- John C. Donkin – The Ice Age Adventures of Buck Wild
- Jesse Eisenberg† – When You Finish Saving the World
- Tim Federle♦ – Better Nate Than Ever
- John Patton Ford† – Emily the Criminal
- Tom George♦ – See How They Run
- Mark Gustafson – Guillermo del Toro's Pinocchio
- Alex Hardcastle♦ – Senior Year
- Lee Jung-jae – Hunt
- Gail Lerner♦ – Cheaper by the Dozen
- Chandler Levack† – I Like Movies
- Angus MacLane – Lightyear
- Spider One ♦ – Allegoria
- Pierre Perifel – The Bad Guys
- J. J. Perry – Day Shift
- Danny and Michael Philippou – Talk to Me
- Domee Shi† – Turning Red
- Goran Stolevski† – You Won't Be Alone
- Channing Tatum and Reid Carolin – Dog
- Charlotte Wells – Aftersun

=== 2023 ===
- Carlos Alcántara – ¡Asu mare! Los amigos
- Kenya Barris♦ – You People
- Houston Bone† – I Don't Know Who You Are
- Billy Bryk and Finn Wolfhard – Hell of a Summer
- Jacob Byrd† – Adalynn
- Charlie Day – Fool's Paradise
- Tom DeLonge – Monsters of California
- Chloe Domont†♦ – Fair Play
- Molly Gordon and Nick Lieberman – Theater Camp
- Felipe Gálvez Haberle – The Settlers
- Meredith Hama-Brown† – Seagrass
- Lee Hong-chi – Love Is a Gun
- Benjamin Howard† – Riley
- Raven Jackson† – All Dirt Roads Taste of Salt
- Cord Jefferson♦ – American Fiction
- Michael Jelenic♦ – The Super Mario Bros. Movie (Note: Co-directed with Aaron Horvath)
- Michael B. Jordan – Creed III
- Zarrar Kahn† – In Flames
- Anna Kendrick – Woman of the Hour
- Chad Kinis – Beks Days of Our Lives
- Robert Kolodny – The Featherweight
- Colin Krawchuk – The Jester
- Adele Lim – Joy Ride
- Eva Longoria♦ – Flamin' Hot
- Nicholas Maggio† – Mob Land
- Flora Martínez – Itzia, Tango & Cacao
- Lee Moss – Birth/Rebirth
- Chris Pine – Poolman
- Molly Preston – Freedom, Wisconsin
- Katherine Propper – Lost Soulz
- F. M. Reyes – In His Mother's Eyes
- A. V. Rockwell† – A Thousand and One
- Joaquim Dos Santos, Kemp Powers, and Justin K. Thompson – Spider-Man: Across the Spider-Verse
- Jingyi Shao† – Chang Can Dunk
- Corey Sherman – Big Boys
- Grant Singer – Reptile
- Celine Song – Past Lives
- Julio Torres – Problemista
- Max Tzannes† – Et Tu
- Fawn Veerasunthorn – Wish (Note: Co-directed with Chris Buck)
- D. W. Waterson♦† – Backspot
- Meera Welankar – Butterfly
- Patrick Wilson – Insidious: The Red Door
- Michael Shannon – Eric Larue

=== 2024 ===
- Curry Barker† – Milk & Serial
- Michiel Blanchart† – Night Call
- Pete Browngardt – The Day the Earth Blew Up: A Looney Tunes Movie
- Spenser Cohen and Anna Halberg – Tarot
- Nicholas Colia – Griffin in Summer
- Ricardo Curtis† – Night of the Zoopocalypse (Note: Co-directed with Rodrigo Perez-Castro)
- Patrick Delage♦ – Despicable Me 4 (Note: Co-directed with Chris Renaud)
- David Derrick Jr., Jason Hand, and Dana Ledoux Miller – Moana 2
- Elle Márjá Eira♦† – Stolen
- Brandon Espy♦† – Mr. Crocket
- Michael Felker – Things Will Be Different
- Julian Glander – Boys Go to Jupiter
- Samantha Jayne♦† and Arturo Perez Jr.♦† – Mean Girls
- Loris Lai – How Kids Roll
- Kelsey Mann♦ – Inside Out 2
- Kelly Marcel – Venom: The Last Dance
- Josh Margolin – Thelma
- Kyle Mooney – Y2K
- Rachel Morrison♦ – The Fire Inside
- Chantelle Murray† – The Lost Tiger
- Ishana Night Shyamalan – The Watchers
- Simon Otto – That Christmas
- Dev Patel† – Monkey Man
- Rich Peppiatt – Kneecap
- Rodrigo Prieto♦ – Pedro Páramo
- Jonathan A. Rosenbaum♦ – Woody Woodpecker Goes to Camp
- Arkasha Stevenson♦† – The First Omen
- Chris Stuckmann† – Shelby Oaks
- Jerry Seinfeld♦ – Unfrosted
- Manasi Sinha – Eta Amader Golpo
- Anu Valia♦† – We Strangers
- Zelda Williams† – Lisa Frankenstein
- Dougal Wilson† – Paddington in Peru

=== 2025 ===
- Pablo Absento – Bloat
- Aziz Ansari – Good Fortune
- Tom Bancroft and John J. Schafer – Light of the World
- Ugo Bienvenu – Arco
- Oscar Boyson – Our Hero, Balthazar
- Harris Dickinson† – Urchin
- Urška Djukić – Little Trouble Girls
- John Early – Maddie's Secret
- Rob Edwards – Sneaks (Note: Co-directed with Chris Jenkins)
- Keith Gomes – Badass Ravi Kumar
- Sasha Leigh Henry† – Dinner with Friends
- Joséphine Japy – The Wonderers
- Scarlett Johansson† – Eleanor the Great
- Maggie Kang – KPop Demon Hunters (Note: Co-directed with Chris Appelhans)
- Kunsang Kyirong† – 100 Sunset
- Melissa LaMartina – For Sale by Exorcist
- Rich Lee† – War of the Worlds
- Ben Leonberg – Good Boy
- Paul Stephen Mann – Shiver Me Timbers
- Nikolas Red – Posthouse
- Sophy Romvari† – Blue Heron
- Melody C. Roscher – Bird in Hand
- Michael Shanks†♦ – Together
- Madeline Sharafian♦† – Elio (Note: Co-directed with Domee Shi and Adrian Molina)
- Kristen Stewart† – The Chronology of Water
- Julia Stiles† – Wish You Were Here
- Taylor Swift† – Taylor Swift: The Official Release Party of a Showgirl
- Eva Victor – Sorry, Baby

== 2026–present ==
=== 2026 ===
- Daniel Alexander† – Gale: Yellow Brick Road
- Dante Balboa – Graduation Day
- Daniel Chong♦† – Hoppers
- Chelsea Devantez – Basic
- Tyree Dillihay♦† – Goat
- Mark "Markiplier" Fischbach♦† – Iron Lung
- Gooseworx♦† – The Amazing Digital Circus: The Last Act
- Aleshea Harris – Is God Is
- Kenna Harris – Toy Story 5 (Note: Co-directed with Andrew Stanton)
- Thomas Kail – Moana
- Padraic McKinley – The Weight
- Januel Mercado – Forgotten Island (Note: Co-directed with Joel Crawford)
- Dylan Meyer – The Wrong Girls
- Kane Parsons† – Backrooms
- Caleb Phillips – Imposters
- Alex Prager† – DreamQuil
- Danny Ramirez – Baton
- Erica Rivinoja – The Cat in the Hat (Note: Co-directed with Alessandro Carloni)
- Yoshitoshi Shinomiya – A New Dawn
- Josie Trinidad♦† – Hexed (Note: Co-directed with Jason Hand and Fawn Veerasunthorn)
- Mike Nybroe – The Influencer Project
- Nicholas Pineda – Infirmary
- Mark Vanselow – The Mongoose

=== 2027 ===
- Trent Correy♦† – Frozen 3 (Note: Co-directed with Jennifer Lee)
- Claire Dodgson – Not Alone (Note: Co-directed with Eric Guillon and Jonathan Del Val)
- Megan Nicole Dong – Bad Fairies
- Rodrigue Huart♦† – The Conjuring: First Communion
- Rob Oliver♦† – The New Simpsons Movie

=== 2028 ===
- Trevor Jimenez and Jesse Andrews – Ghost Market
- Alex Kister† – The Mandela Catalogue
- Noëlle Raffaele – The Lunar Chronicles

=== Upcoming ===
- Kevin Armento and Jaki Bradley – The One
- Alice Birch – Sweetsick
- Michael Cera – Love Is Not the Answer
- Emily Dean – Tao
- John D. Eraklis and Tara Nicole Whitaker – Pierre the Pigeon-Hawk
- Bill Hader – They Know
- Keith Jardine† – Killer Kafé
- Minkyu Lee† – The Witch Boy
- Natasha Lyonne† – Uncanny Valley
- Vivienne Medrano♦† – Prehistoria
- Matthew Puccini – TBA
- Ben Shirinian – The Housewife
- Jeremy Slater – Thread: An Insidious Tale
- Jackie Torrens – Baby
- David Weil – Tyrant

== See also ==
- List of cinematic firsts
- History of film technology
