= The Influencer Project =

2026 found-footage horror-thriller film

- Theatrical release poster
- Directed by: Mike Nybroe
- Written by: Anders Jon; Mike Nybroe; Lars Andreas Pedersen
- Produced by: Gregg Hale; Alex Hertzberg; Mike Nybroe; Eduardo Sánchez; Ahmet Zappa
- Starring: Chiara King; Luca Storm; Mike Nybroe; Jazmine Summer; Alexandre Willaume
- Cinematography: Daniel Parmo
- Edited by: Anders Jon
- Music by: MFR; DJ White Shadow
- Production companies: Hades Films; Pont Neuf Productions; Voltron Global Media
- Distributed by: Hades Films
- Release date: October 2, 2026
- Running time: 102 minutes
- Countries: Denmark; United States
- Language: English

The Influencer Project is a 2026 American horror film directed, written, and produced by Mike Nybroe, in her feature directorial debut.

The film was released in the United States on October 2, 2026.

== Cast ==
- Chiara King as Herself
- Gemma Karlsen as Anna
- Eos Karlsson as Rasmus
- Luca Storm as Victor
- Mike Nybroe as Himself
- Jazmine Summer as Alice
- Alexandre Willaume as King Slayer
- Ronja Hauge Schierup as Alma

== Production ==
Both director Eduardo Sánchez and Gregg Hale of the film The Blair Witch Project set to produce the film with Alex Hertzberg, Mike Nybroe and Ahmet Zappa.

=== Music and writing ===
The screenplay was co-written by director Mike Nybroe alongside Lars Ap and Anders Jon Petersen. DJ White Shadow serves as the composer and music supervisor of the film.

=== Casting ===
The production cast real British social media influencer Chiara King to star as a fictional version of herself.

=== Filming ===
Principal photography took place in Copenhagen, Denmark.

== Release ==
The film was released in the United States on October 2, 2026. The film was originally scheduled to be released in September. The film also scheduled to release in UK on October 16, 2026 and will be available in DVD, Blu-ray, and all digital platforms on November 30, 2026.

== Reception ==
On the review aggregator website Rotten Tomatoes, 54% of 13 critics' reviews are positive, with an average rating of 5.40/10.

Most of the critics gave the film a negative reviews.

Dennis Harvey of Variety gave the film a negative feedback and wrote "Despite not strictly hewing to the found-footage template established by the 1999 sleeper hit, this opus lands smack in the mediocre middle of umpteen forgettable imitations churned out ever since."

Natalia Winkelman of The New York Times also gave the film a negative review and she said "These are worthy ideas, but in their chaotic cascade, they feel muddled".

Josh Bate of Screen Rant gave the film a rating of 4 out of 10 and wrote "There’s simply nothing scary about this movie, and this failure becomes even more apparent as it attempts to ramp up the tension in the third act."

Robert Kojder of Flickering Myth gave the film a rating of 2.5 out of 5 and simply wrote "It’s a failed project."

Matt Konopka of Dread Central gave the film a negative review and a 1 over 5 rating and he wrote "Despite a solid performance from Chiara King, The Influencer Project is a been there, done that slog with little to nothing to add to the sub-genre of influencer horror movies."

Simon Abrams of RogerEbert.com gave the film a rating of 1 over 4 and wrote "It looks bland, doesn’t make much sense, and takes its time getting you to places you’ve been several times before."
