= Cowboys Cry for It =

1925 film

- Directed by: Clyde Bruckman
- Starring: Stan Laurel
- Release date: 1925
- Country: United States
- Language: Silent

Cowboys Cry for It is a 1925 short film comedy starring Stan Laurel.

Directed by Clyde Bruckman.
