= Luggage of the Gods! =

- Directed by: David Kendall
- Written by: David Kendall
- Produced by: Jeff Folmsbee
- Starring: Mark Stolzenberg; Gabriel Barre; Gwen Ellison; Martin Haber
- Cinematography: Steven Ross
- Edited by: Jack Haigis
- Music by: Cengiz Yaltkaya
- Distributed by: Academy Home (1983) (VHS)
- Release date: June 19, 1983
- Running time: 74 minutes
- Country: United States
- Language: English

Luggage of the Gods! is a 1983 American comedy film.

== Plot ==
In the film, cavemen living in a mountainous region of Latin America are completely disconnected from the modern world. They speak a simple constructed language, similar to that used in the 1981 film Caveman. They worship and greatly fear airliners that regularly pass overhead. Tradition in the tribe dictated that they avert their eyes whenever a plane flies overhead. One day, an airliner's cargo malfunctions, causing it to jettison a good deal of luggage. Two young male cavemen break the taboo against looking at the planes, and observe the falling luggage. When they leave the tribe, they find clothing, cassettes, and counterfeit paintings, which wreak havoc on the power structure and economy of the tribe. Events get even more out of hand when the counterfeiters come looking for the paintings.

== Production ==
Writer and director David Kendall had an extremely tight budget. According to The New York Times, the film was shot "entirely on locations in New York, at city parks and near Bear Mountain".

Similar themes were explored in The Gods Must Be Crazy, a film in which an isolated African tribe was wrecked by a Coke bottle thrown from a plane.

== Release ==
The film was released on June 19, 1983, and is available on VHS. It was released on DVD in 2013 by Mr. Fat-W Video.

== See also ==
- Caveman
