= List of Warner Bros. Pictures Animation productions =

This is a list of productions from Warner Bros. Pictures Animation, previously known as Warner Animation Group, an American animation studio based in Burbank, California, United States. In total, Warner Bros. Pictures Animation has produced 12 feature films and a total gross of over $2 billion.

== Feature films ==
Film	Release date	Director(s)	Writer(s)		Producer(s)	Executive producer(s)	Composer(s)	Co-production with	Animation services
Film	Release date	Director(s)	Story	Screenplay	Producer(s)	Executive producer(s)	Composer(s)	Co-production with	Animation services
As Warner Animation Group
The Lego Movie (Note: Live-action/animated)	February 7, 2014	Phil Lord; Christopher Miller	Based on the construction toys by The Lego Group	Based on the construction toys by The Lego Group	Dan Lin; Roy Lee	Jill Wilfert; Matthew Ashton; Kathleen Fleming; Allison Abbate; Zareh Nalbandian; Jon Burton; Benjamin Melniker; Michael E. Uslan; Seanne Winslow; James Packer; Steven Mnuchin; Matt Skiena; Bruce Berman	Mark Mothersbaugh	Village Roadshow Pictures; Lego System A/S; Vertigo Entertainment; Lin Pictures	Animal Logic
The Lego Movie	February 7, 2014	Phil Lord; Christopher Miller	Dan Hageman; Kevin Hageman; Phil Lord; Christopher Miller	Phil Lord; Christopher Miller	Dan Lin; Roy Lee	Jill Wilfert; Matthew Ashton; Kathleen Fleming; Allison Abbate; Zareh Nalbandian; Jon Burton; Benjamin Melniker; Michael E. Uslan; Seanne Winslow; James Packer; Steven Mnuchin; Matt Skiena; Bruce Berman	Mark Mothersbaugh	Village Roadshow Pictures; Lego System A/S; Vertigo Entertainment; Lin Pictures	Animal Logic
Storks	September 23, 2016	Nicholas Stoller; Doug Sweetland	Nicholas Stoller	Nicholas Stoller	Brad Lewis; Nicholas Stoller	Glenn Ficarra; Phil Lord; Christopher Miller; John Requa; Jared Stern; Steven Mnuchin	Mychael Danna; Jeff Danna	RatPac-Dune Entertainment; Stoller Global Solutions (uncredited)	Sony Pictures Imageworks
The Lego Batman Movie	February 10, 2017	Chris McKay	Based on the construction toys by The Lego Group and the characters from DC		Dan Lin; Phil Lord; Christopher Miller; Roy Lee	Jill Wilfert; Matthew Ashton; Will Allegra; Brad Lewis; Zareh Nalbandian; Steven Mnuchin	Lorne Balfe	DC Entertainment; RatPac-Dune Entertainment; Lego System A/S; Lord Miller Productions; Vertigo Entertainment; Lin Pictures	Animal Logic
The Lego Batman Movie	February 10, 2017	Chris McKay	Seth Grahame-Smith	Seth Grahame-Smith; Chris McKenna; Erik Sommers; Jared Stern; John Whittington	Dan Lin; Phil Lord; Christopher Miller; Roy Lee	Jill Wilfert; Matthew Ashton; Will Allegra; Brad Lewis; Zareh Nalbandian; Steven Mnuchin	Lorne Balfe	DC Entertainment; RatPac-Dune Entertainment; Lego System A/S; Lord Miller Productions; Vertigo Entertainment; Lin Pictures	Animal Logic
The Lego Ninjago Movie	September 22, 2017	Charlie Bean; Paul Fisher; Bob Logan	Based on the construction toys and the characters by The Lego Group		Dan Lin; Phil Lord; Christopher Miller; Chris McKay; Maryann Garger; Roy Lee	Jill Wilfert; Keith Malone; Simon Lucas; Chris Leahy; Seth Grahame-Smith; Zareh Nalbandian; Brett Ratner	Mark Mothersbaugh	RatPac-Dune Entertainment; Lego System A/S; Vertigo Entertainment; Lord Miller Productions; Lin Pictures	Animal Logic
The Lego Ninjago Movie	September 22, 2017	Charlie Bean; Paul Fisher; Bob Logan	Hilary Winston; Bob Logan; Paul Fisher; William Wheeler; Tom Wheeler; Dan Hageman; Kevin Hageman	Bob Logan; Paul Fisher; William Wheeler; Tom Wheeler; Jared Stern; John Whittington	Dan Lin; Phil Lord; Christopher Miller; Chris McKay; Maryann Garger; Roy Lee	Jill Wilfert; Keith Malone; Simon Lucas; Chris Leahy; Seth Grahame-Smith; Zareh Nalbandian; Brett Ratner	Mark Mothersbaugh	RatPac-Dune Entertainment; Lego System A/S; Vertigo Entertainment; Lord Miller Productions; Lin Pictures	Animal Logic
Smallfoot	September 28, 2018	Karey Kirkpatrick Co-Director: Jason Reisig	Based on the unpublished book "Yeti Tracks" by Sergio Pablos	Based on the unpublished book "Yeti Tracks" by Sergio Pablos	Bonne Radford; Glenn Ficarra; John Requa	Nicholas Stoller; Phil Lord; Christopher Miller; Jared Stern; Karey Kirkpatrick; Sergio Pablos; Courtenay Valenti; Allison Abbate	Heitor Pereira (score) Karey Kirkpatrick; Wayne Kirkpatrick (songs)	Zaftig Films	Sony Pictures Imageworks
Smallfoot	September 28, 2018	Karey Kirkpatrick Co-Director: Jason Reisig	John Requa; Glenn Ficarra; Karey Kirkpatrick	Karey Kirkpatrick; Clare Sera	Bonne Radford; Glenn Ficarra; John Requa	Nicholas Stoller; Phil Lord; Christopher Miller; Jared Stern; Karey Kirkpatrick; Sergio Pablos; Courtenay Valenti; Allison Abbate	Heitor Pereira (score) Karey Kirkpatrick; Wayne Kirkpatrick (songs)	Zaftig Films	Sony Pictures Imageworks
The Lego Movie 2: The Second Part	February 8, 2019	Mike Mitchell	Based on the construction toys by The Lego Group	Based on the construction toys by The Lego Group	Dan Lin; Phil Lord; Christopher Miller; Roy Lee; Jinko Gotoh	Jill Wilfert; Keith Malone; Matthew Ashton; Chris McKay; Zareh Nalbandian; Ryan Halprin; Will Allegra; Chris Leahy	Mark Mothersbaugh	Lego System A/S; Vertigo Entertainment; Lord Miller Productions; Rideback	Animal Logic
The Lego Movie 2: The Second Part	February 8, 2019	Mike Mitchell	Phil Lord; Christopher Miller; Matthew Fogel	Phil Lord; Christopher Miller	Dan Lin; Phil Lord; Christopher Miller; Roy Lee; Jinko Gotoh	Jill Wilfert; Keith Malone; Matthew Ashton; Chris McKay; Zareh Nalbandian; Ryan Halprin; Will Allegra; Chris Leahy	Mark Mothersbaugh	Lego System A/S; Vertigo Entertainment; Lord Miller Productions; Rideback	Animal Logic
Scoob!	May 15, 2020 (Note: Released on Premium VOD in the United States and Canada on this date, and later released in theaters in select countries with relaxed COVID-19 restrictions beginning July 8, 2020.)	Tony Cervone	Based on the characters by Hanna-Barbera Productions	Based on the characters by Hanna-Barbera Productions	Pam Coats; Allison Abbate	Adam Sztykiel; Charles Roven; Richard Suckle; Jesse Ehrman; Dan Povenmire; Chris Columbus	Tom Holkenborg	1492 Pictures (uncredited)	Reel FX Creative Studios
Scoob!	May 15, 2020	Tony Cervone	Matt Lieberman; Eyal Podell; Jonathon E. Stewart	Adam Sztykiel; Jack Donaldson; Derek Elliott; Matt Lieberman	Pam Coats; Allison Abbate	Adam Sztykiel; Charles Roven; Richard Suckle; Jesse Ehrman; Dan Povenmire; Chris Columbus	Tom Holkenborg	1492 Pictures (uncredited)	Reel FX Creative Studios
Tom & Jerry	February 26, 2021	Tim Story	Based on the characters by William Hanna and Joseph Barbera	Based on the characters by William Hanna and Joseph Barbera	Chris DeFaria	Tim Story; Adam Goodman; Steven Harding; Sam Register; Jesse Ehrman; Allison Abbate	Christopher Lennertz	The Story Company; Turner Entertainment Co.	Framestore
Tom & Jerry	February 26, 2021	Tim Story	Kevin Costello	Kevin Costello	Chris DeFaria	Tim Story; Adam Goodman; Steven Harding; Sam Register; Jesse Ehrman; Allison Abbate	Christopher Lennertz	The Story Company; Turner Entertainment Co.	Framestore
Space Jam: A New Legacy	July 16, 2021	Malcolm D. Lee	Juel Taylor; Tony Rettenmaier; Keenan Coogler; Terence Nance	Juel Taylor; Tony Rettenmaier; Keenan Coogler; Terence Nance; Jesse Gordon; Celeste Ballard	Ryan Coogler; LeBron James; Maverick Carter; Duncan Henderson	Sev Ohanian; Zinzi Coogler; Allison Abbate; Jesse Ehrman; Jamal Henderson; Spencer Beighley; Justin Lin; Terence Nance; Ivan Reitman	Kris Bowers	Proximity Media; SpringHill Company	Industrial Light & Magic; Luma Pictures; Cinesite; Company 3 Animation; Tonic DNA; House of Moves; Day For Nite; Studio D Virtuos
DC League of Super-Pets	July 29, 2022	Jared Stern Co-Director: Sam Levine	Based on the characters from DC	Based on the characters from DC	Patricia Hicks; Dwayne Johnson; Dany Garcia; Hiram Garcia; Jared Stern	John Requa; Glenn Ficarra; Nicholas Stoller; Allison Abbate; Chris Leahy; Sharon Taylor; Courtenay Valenti	Steve Jablonsky	DC Entertainment; Seven Bucks Productions	Animal Logic
DC League of Super-Pets	July 29, 2022	Jared Stern Co-Director: Sam Levine	Jared Stern; John Whittington	Jared Stern; John Whittington	Patricia Hicks; Dwayne Johnson; Dany Garcia; Hiram Garcia; Jared Stern	John Requa; Glenn Ficarra; Nicholas Stoller; Allison Abbate; Chris Leahy; Sharon Taylor; Courtenay Valenti	Steve Jablonsky	DC Entertainment; Seven Bucks Productions	Animal Logic
Coyote vs. Acme	August 28, 2026	Dave Green	Based on the New York article "Coyote v. Acme" by Ian Frazier		Chris DeFaria; James Gunn	Jesse Ehrman; Allison Abbate; Carsten Lorenz	Steven Price	Troll Court Entertainment; Keylight Pictures (distributed by Ketchup Entertainment)	DNEG; Duncan Studio (2D animation)
Coyote vs. Acme	August 28, 2026	Dave Green	James Gunn; Jeremy Slater; Samy Burch	Samy Burch	Chris DeFaria; James Gunn	Jesse Ehrman; Allison Abbate; Carsten Lorenz	Steven Price	Troll Court Entertainment; Keylight Pictures (distributed by Ketchup Entertainment)	DNEG; Duncan Studio (2D animation)
As Warner Bros. Pictures Animation
The Cat in the Hat	November 6, 2026	Erica Rivinoja; Alessandro Carloni	Based on the book by Dr. Seuss	Based on the book by Dr. Seuss	Daniela Mazzucato; Jared Stern	Bill Hader; Susan Brandt; Bill Damaschke; Pete Chiappetta; Andrew Lary; Anthony Tittanegro; Kelly Marcel; Steve Zissis; Tim Story; Alex Timbers	Lorne Balfe	Dr. Seuss Enterprises; A Stern Talking To	DNEG Animation
The Cat in the Hat	November 6, 2026	Erica Rivinoja; Alessandro Carloni	Caroline Williams	Erica Rivinoja; Alessandro Carloni	Daniela Mazzucato; Jared Stern	Bill Hader; Susan Brandt; Bill Damaschke; Pete Chiappetta; Andrew Lary; Anthony Tittanegro; Kelly Marcel; Steve Zissis; Tim Story; Alex Timbers	Lorne Balfe	Dr. Seuss Enterprises; A Stern Talking To	DNEG Animation

== Upcoming ==
Film	Release date	Director(s)	Writer(s)		Producer(s)	Executive producer(s)	Composer(s)	Co-production with	Animation services	Production status	Ref.
Film	Release date	Director(s)	Story	Screenplay	Producer(s)	Executive producer(s)	Composer(s)	Co-production with	Animation services	Production status	Ref.
Bad Fairies	May 21, 2027	Megan Nicole Dong Co-Director: Olivier Staphylas	Deborah Frances-White; Zoë Tomalin	Deborah Frances-White; Zoë Tomalin	Carolyn Soper	TBA	Isabella Summers (score) Toby Marlow; Lucy Moss (songs)	Locksmith Animation; Sketchshark Productions	DNEG Animation	In production	
Margie Claus	November 12, 2027	Kirk DeMicco	Ben Falcone; Damon Jones	Ben Falcone; Damon Jones	Melissa McCarthy; Ben Falcone; Michelle L.M Wong	TBA	TBA (score) Meghan Trainor; Ben Falcone; Damon Jones (songs)	New Line Cinema; On the Day Productions	DNEG Animation	In production	
Oh, the Places You'll Go!	March 17, 2028	Jon M. Chu Co-Director: Jill Culton	Based on the book by Dr. Seuss	Based on the book by Dr. Seuss	J. J. Abrams; Gregg Taylor	TBA	TBA (score) Benj Pasek; Justin Paul (songs)	Dr. Seuss Enterprises; Bad Robot Productions	Industrial Light & Magic	In production	
Oh, the Places You'll Go!	March 17, 2028	Jon M. Chu Co-Director: Jill Culton	Rob Lieber	Rob Lieber	J. J. Abrams; Gregg Taylor	TBA	TBA (score) Benj Pasek; Justin Paul (songs)	Dr. Seuss Enterprises; Bad Robot Productions	Industrial Light & Magic	In production	
Hello Kitty	July 21, 2028	David Derrick Jr. John Aoshima	Based on the character by Yuko Shimizu	Based on the character by Yuko Shimizu	Ramsey Ann Naito; Beau Flynn	Wendy Jacobson	TBA	New Line Cinema; Sanrio; FlynnPictureCo. Known Universe	TBA	In production	
Hello Kitty	July 21, 2028	David Derrick Jr. John Aoshima	Jeff Chan	Jeff Chan	Ramsey Ann Naito; Beau Flynn	Wendy Jacobson	TBA	New Line Cinema; Sanrio; FlynnPictureCo. Known Universe	TBA	In production	
Dynamic Duo	September 22, 2028	Arthur Mintz	Matthew Aldrich; Scott Neustadter; Michael H. Weber	Matthew Aldrich; Scott Neustadter; Michael H. Weber	James Gunn; Peter Safran; Matt Reeves; Lynn Harris; Theresa Andersson	Michael E. Uslan	TBA	DC Studios; Swaybox; 6th & Idaho	Swaybox	In production	
The Lunar Chronicles	November 3, 2028	Noëlle Raffaele	Based on the book series by Marissa Meyer	Based on the book series by Marissa Meyer	Christina Steinberg	TBA	TBA	Locksmith Animation	Industrial Light & Magic	In production	
The Lunar Chronicles	November 3, 2028	Noëlle Raffaele	Lindsey Ferrentino; Kalen Egan; Travis Sentell	Lindsey Ferrentino; Kalen Egan; Travis Sentell	Christina Steinberg	TBA	TBA	Locksmith Animation	Industrial Light & Magic	In production	

=== Films in development ===
Title	Notes
Emily the Strange	co-production with Bad Robot and Dark Horse Entertainment
Forestina	
Funko^{[S]}	
The Ice Dragon	
Meerkat Manor	co-production with The Green Room and Oxford Scientific Films
Meet the Flintstones	
Metal Men	co-production with DC Studios
Oskee And Gabe Make A Mixtape	co-production with Angry Hero Productions
Peanut Jones	
Prehistoria	co-production with SpindleHorse
Supercolossal	co-production with Bad Robot
Speedy Gonzales	co-production with Mexopolis
Thing One and Thing Two	co-production with Dr. Seuss Enterprises
Thisby Thestoop	
Untitled Bugs Bunny film	
Untitled David Derrick Jr. film	
Untitled Jetsons film	
Untitled Looney Tunes heist film	
Untitled The Powerpuff Girls film	co-production with Cartoon Network Studios
Untitled Static film	co-production with DC Studios
Untitled Thundercats film	
Untitled Tom and Jerry film	
Untitled Wacky Races film	
Which Way To Anywhere	
Zero	co-production with Imagine Entertainment

== Cancelled or inactive projects ==
Title	Description
The Billion Brick Race	A Lego Movie spin-off film announced in March 2015, with Jason Segel and Drew Pearce signed on to co-direct and write. Jorge R. Gutierrez had signed on as director in August 2017, with a release date of May 24, 2019. Cancelled after The Lego Movie 2: The Second Part underperformed at the box office and the franchise moved to Universal Pictures in 2019.
Meet the Beatles	An animated musical film based on the Beatles announced in September 2015, with Paul King in talks to direct.
Fowl Road	Announced in February 2016, with Nicholas Stoller to direct. Would have been a take on the "Why did the chicken cross the road?" joke.
Pepé Le Pew: The City of Lights	In 2016, Max Landis told San Diego Comic-Con that he was writing a Pepé Le Pew film. The film’s script has been leaked online. Artists have published concept art for the film. The movie was cancelled due to sexual assault allegations against Landis in 2017, and a report that the character has not yet been planned to appear in future Warner Bros. productions leaves the feature film in doubt.
Bone	Announced in November 2016; an animated adaptation to be produced by Lin Pictures and Animal Logic, with Mark Osborne set to direct. Netflix eventually picked it up as an animated series, but was later cancelled in April 2022 due to a reorganization of Netflix Animation.
Lego Superfriends	Sequel to The Lego Batman Movie to be directed by Chris McKay. Cancelled after the Lego Movie franchise went to Universal in 2019 following the box office underperformance of The Lego Movie 2: The Second Part.
Contagious and Emmet Amuck	Two additional Lego Movie shorts for theatrical distribution were in production alongside The Master in 2016: Contagious directed by Patrick Osborne, and Emmet Amuck directed by Jon Saunders and Ross Evans. Both ultimately went unreleased.
Scoob! Holiday Haunt	Prequel to Scoob! directed by Bill Haller and Michael Kurinsky, originally intended for release on HBO Max. Despite production eventually being completed, the film's release was cancelled after the merger of WarnerMedia and Discovery, Inc. to form Warner Bros. Discovery by CEO David Zaslav in August 2022.
Toto	Feature film adaptation of the Michael Morpurgo and Emma Chichester Clark novel Toto: The Dog-Gone Amazing Story of the Wizard of Oz directed by Alex Timbers and written by John August. The animation would have been done by Animal Logic.

== Short films ==
Title	Release date	Release with	Type of short
Enter the Ninjago	June 17, 2014	The Lego Movie	Direct-to-video short
The Lego Movie: 4D – A New Adventure	January 29, 2016	4D attraction	
The Master	September 23, 2016	Storks	Theatrical short
Pigeon Toady's Guide to Your New Baby	December 6, 2016	Storks	Direct-to-video short
Dark Hoser	June 13, 2017	The Lego Batman Movie	Direct-to-video short
Batman is Just Not That Into You	June 13, 2017	The Lego Batman Movie	Direct-to-video short
Cooking with Alfred	June 13, 2017	The Lego Batman Movie	Direct-to-video short
Movie Sound Effects: How Do They Do That?	June 13, 2017	The Lego Batman Movie	Direct-to-video short
Shark E. Shark in "Which Way to the Ocean?"	December 19, 2017	The Lego Ninjago Movie	Direct-to-video short
Zane's Stand Up Promo	December 19, 2017	The Lego Ninjago Movie	Direct-to-video short
Turkish Airlines: Safety Video with The LEGO Movie Characters	August 1, 2018	—N/a	Internet short
Emmet's Holiday Party	December 10, 2018	—N/a	Internet short and direct-to-video short
Super Soozie	December 11, 2018	Smallfoot	Direct-to-video short
"Everything is Awesome" Dance Together Music Video	January 8, 2019	—N/a	Internet short
Turkish Airlines: Safety Video with The LEGO Movie 2 Characters	March 1, 2019	—N/a	Internet short
Daffy Season	June 22, 2026	The Cat in the Hat	Theatrical short

== Reception ==
=== Critical and public response ===
Critical and public response of Phase Four Warner Bros. Pictures Animation films
Film	Critical		Public
Film	Rotten Tomatoes	Metacritic	CinemaScore
The Lego Movie	96% (258 reviews)	83 (43 reviews)	A
Storks	65% (139 reviews)	56 (31 reviews)	A−
The Lego Batman Movie	89% (313 reviews)	75 (48 reviews)	A−
The Lego Ninjago Movie	56% (132 reviews)	55 (33 reviews)	B+
Smallfoot	76% (129 reviews)	60 (25 reviews)	A−
The Lego Movie 2: The Second Part	84% (300 reviews)	65 (52 reviews)	A−
Scoob!	48% (152 reviews)	43 (33 reviews)	—N/a
Tom & Jerry	29% (130 reviews)	32 (20 reviews)	A−
Space Jam: A New Legacy	25% (229 reviews)	36 (46 reviews)	A−
DC League of Super-Pets	72% (150 reviews)	56 (28 reviews)	A−
Coyote vs. Acme	96% (267 reviews)	77 (46 reviews)	A
The Cat in the Hat	48% (66 reviews)	46 (16 reviews)	A

=== Box office performance ===
Film	Budget	North America		Overseas gross	Worldwide gross (unadjusted)	Ref.
Film	Budget	Opening	Gross (unadjusted)	Overseas gross	Worldwide gross (unadjusted)	Ref.
The Lego Movie	$60–65 million	$69,050,279	$257,760,692	$210,300,000	$468,060,692	
Storks	$70 million	$21,311,407	$72,679,278	$110,709,675	$183,388,953	
The Lego Batman Movie	$80 million	$53,003,468	$175,750,384	$136,200,000	$311,950,384	
The Lego Ninjago Movie	$70 million	$20,433,071	$59,281,555	$63,800,000	$123,081,555	
Smallfoot	$80 million	$23,045,635	$83,240,103	$130,800,000	$214,040,103	
The Lego Movie 2: The Second Part	$99 million	$34,115,335	$105,956,290	$93,646,912	$199,603,202	
Scoob!	$90 million	$850,000	$2,188,425	$26,370,740	$28,559,165	
Tom & Jerry	$79 million	$14,112,629	$46,536,687	$89,960,850	$136,497,537	
Space Jam: A New Legacy	$150 million	$31,053,362	$70,592,228	$93,100,000	$163,692,228	
DC League of Super-Pets	$90 million	$23,000,000	$93,657,117	$113,900,000	$207,557,117	
Coyote vs. Acme	$70–72 million	$15,000,000	$49,869,976	$24,965,765	$74,835,741	

== Accolades ==
=== Academy Awards ===
Year	Film	Category	Recipient(s)	Result	Ref.
2014	The Lego Movie	Best Original Song	"Everything Is Awesome" written and lyrics by Shawn Patterson	Nominated	

=== Annie Awards ===
Year	Film	Category	Recipient(s)	Result	Ref.
2014	The Lego Movie	Best Animated Feature	The Lego Movie	Nominated	
2014	The Lego Movie	Outstanding Achievement for Animated Effects in an Animated Production	Jayandera Danappal, Matt Ebb, Christian Epunan Hernandez, Danielle Brooks, and Raphael Gadot	Nominated	
2014	The Lego Movie	Outstanding Achievement for Directing in a Feature Production	Phil Lord, Christopher Miller, and Chris McKay	Nominated	
2014	The Lego Movie	Outstanding Achievement for Production Design in an Animated Feature Production	Grant Freckelton	Nominated	
2014	The Lego Movie	Outstanding Achievement for Writing in a Feature Production	Phil Lord and Christopher Miller	Won	
2014	The Lego Movie	Outstanding Achievement for Editorial in a Feature Production	David Burrows, Todd Hansen, Doug Nicholas, Jonathan Tappin, and Courtney O'Brien-Brown	Nominated	
2016	Storks	Outstanding Achievement, Voice Acting in an Animated Feature Production	Katie Crown	Nominated	
2017	The Lego Batman Movie	Directing in a Feature Production	Chris McKay	Nominated	
2017	The Lego Batman Movie	Voice Acting in an Animated Feature Production	Zach Galifianakis	Nominated	
2017	The Lego Batman Movie	Editorial in an Animated Feature Production	David Burrows, Matt Villa and John Venzon	Nominated	
2018	Smallfoot	Annie Award for Music in a Feature Production	Heitor Pereira, Karey Kirkpatrick, Wayne Kirkpatrick	Nominated	

=== British Academy Film Awards ===
Year	Film	Category	Recipient(s)	Result	Ref.
2014	The Lego Movie	Best Animated Film	Phil Lord and Christopher Miller	Won	

=== Critics' Choice Movie Awards ===
Year	Film	Category	Recipient(s)	Result	Ref.
2014	The Lego Movie	Best Animated Feature	The Lego Movie	Won	
2014	The Lego Movie	Best Song	"Everything Is Awesome"	Nominated	

=== Golden Raspberry Awards ===
Year	Film	Category	Recipient(s)	Result	Ref.
2021	Tom & Jerry	Worst Prequel, Remake, Rip-off or Sequel		Nominated	
2021	Tom & Jerry	Worst Screen Combo	Tom & Jerry (aka Itchy & Scratchy)	Nominated	
2021	Space Jam: A New Legacy	Worst Picture	Maverick Carter, Ryan Coogler, Duncan Henderson, and LeBron James	Nominated	
2021	Space Jam: A New Legacy	Worst Actor	LeBron James as himself	Won	
2021	Space Jam: A New Legacy	Worst Prequel, Remake, Rip-off or Sequel		Won	
2021	Space Jam: A New Legacy	Worst Screen Combo	LeBron James & any Warner cartoon character (or Time-Warner product) he dribbles on	Won	

=== Satellite Award ===
Year	Film	Category	Recipient(s)	Result	Ref.
2014	The Lego Movie	Best Motion Picture Animated or Mixed Media	The Lego Movie	Nominated	
2014	The Lego Movie	Best Original Screenplay	Phil Lord and Christopher Miller	Nominated	
2014	The Lego Movie	Best Original Song	"Everything Is Awesome"	Nominated	
2017	The Lego Batman Movie	Best Animated or Mixed Media Feature	The Lego Batman Movie	Nominated	

=== Saturn Award ===
Year	Film	Category	Recipient(s)	Result	Ref.
2014	The Lego Movie	Best Animated Film	The Lego Movie	Won	

== See also ==
- List of computer-animated films
- List of Warner Bros. theatrical animated feature films
