= DNEG =

British visual effects company

Coordinates: 51.521114°N 0.141841°W

Double Negative Limited
- Logo used since 2025
- Trade name: DNEG
- Type: Subsidiary
- Industry: Motion picture, TV, Animation
- Founded: 1998; 28 years ago
- Headquarters: Fitzrovia, London, England
- Number of locations: 9
- Key people: Namit Malhotra (CEO)
- Services: Visual effects Computer animation Stereo conversion
- Parent: Prime Focus
- Subsidiaries: Ánima Kitchent
- Website: dneg.com

DNEG (formerly known as Double Negative and pronounced D-NEG) is a British-Indian visual effects, computer animation and stereo conversion digital studio that was founded in 1998 in London, and rebranded as DNEG in 2014 after a merger with Indian visual effects company Prime Focus.

DNEG has won eight Academy Awards for its work on the films Inception, Interstellar, Ex Machina, Blade Runner 2049, First Man, Tenet, Dune and Dune: Part Two. The company has also won eight BAFTA awards for Inception, Harry Potter and the Deathly Hallows – Part 2, Interstellar, Blade Runner 2049, Tenet, Dune, Dune: Part Two and the Black Mirror episode "Metalhead". DNEG has received widespread acclaim, winning multiple Visual Effects Society (VES) awards for films including The Dark Knight Rises, Sherlock Holmes, Inception, Interstellar, Dunkirk, Blade Runner 2049, First Man, Last Night In Soho, Nyad, Dune: Part One and Dune: Part Two, and television shows such as Chernobyl, Foundation, The Last of Us and The Lord of the Rings: The Rings of Power. DNEG has also garnered Primetime Emmy Awards for its work on Dreamkeeper, Chernobyl, Star Trek: Discovery (Season 3) and The Last of Us.

DNEG is headquartered in Fitzrovia, London with additional locations in Vancouver, Mumbai, Los Angeles, Hyderabad, Montréal, Mohali, Bangalore, Chennai, Toronto, and Sydney.

== History ==
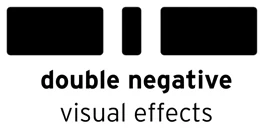
Double Negative logo used from 2000 to 2018

Double Negative first opened its doors in 1998 in London. Founded by a small group of industry professionals, including Peter Chiang (Senior VFX Supervisor), Matt Holben (Joint MD), Alex Hope (Joint MD) and Paul Franklin (Senior VFX Supervisor), it has grown from a small team to 9,000 members of staff worldwide.

Over the years, DNEG has worked on over 250 movies and developed working relationships with a number of leading directors. Its first project was Pitch Black, released in 2000. Since then, DNEG's work can be seen in recurring franchises like Harry Potter, Fantastic Beasts, the Marvel Cinematic Universe, James Bond, Bourne, Fast & Furious, Mission: Impossible and the DC Extended Universe. DNEG has worked on award-winning projects such as Inception, Interstellar, Ex Machina, Dunkirk, Blade Runner 2049, Black Mirror ("Metalhead"), Altered Carbon, First Man, Chernobyl, Tenet, Star Trek: Discovery (season 3), The Last of Us, and Dune: Parts One and Two.

DNEG's visual effects work has won eight Academy Awards, eight British Academy Film Awards, twenty-six Visual Effects Society Awards and four Primetime Emmy Awards.

=== Ownership ===
Logo used from 2018 to 2025

In July 2014, Indian visual effects company Prime Focus World merged with Double Negative.

In 2018, the company was rebranded as DNEG.

In August 2021, UK-based firm Novator Capital Advisors invested $250 million in Prime Focus Limited, DNEG's parent company. This deal boosted CEO and Prime Focus founder Namit Malhotra's stake in the parent to 70% from 35%, and as the owner of Novator, Icelandic billionaire Thor Björgólfsson received a 15% stake in DNEG.

On 25 January 2022, DNEG announced its entry into a definitive business combination agreement with Sports Ventures Acquisition Corp. (Nasdaq: AKIC). Subject to customary closing conditions, which were expected in the first half of 2022, the combined public company would be named DNEG. DNEG called off the merger and public listing in June 2022, with CEO Malhotra vowing to expand further.

=== International expansion ===
In 2009, Double Negative opened its Singapore office, and subsequently closed it in March 2016.

After merging with Prime Focus in 2014, DNEG established a branch in Mumbai branch and expanded its global presence with facilities in Vancouver, Los Angeles, Hyderabad, Chennai, Montréal, Mohali, Bangalore and Toronto.

In November 2022, DNEG announced the opening of a new studio in Sydney, Australia, where its VFX and animation divisions will work. Located in Pyrmont, the studio is led by VFX supervisor Andrew Jackson, who spearheaded the visual effects for George Miller's Furiosa: A Mad Max Saga.

On 29 January 2025, DNEG updated its logo and branding.

In June 2026, DNEG has acquired Ánima Kitchent.

== Services and divisions ==
=== Visual effects ===
Originally established as a visual effects (VFX) studio specialized in VFX for feature films, DNEG has evolved to offer a broader range of services, including VFX and animation for feature films and episodic projects, along with stereo conversion.

In 2013, DNEG launched its Episodic VFX team, specifically dedicated to producing visual effects for television, OTT, and streaming platforms. This initiative was designed to give content producers and networks access to DNEG's expertise and infrastructure for non-theatrical projects.

=== Animation ===
DNEG Animation
- Logo used since 2025
- Formerly: DNEG Feature Animation (2014–2021)
- Type: Division
- Industry: CGI animation
- Founded: 11 April 2014; 12 years ago
- Website: www.dneg.com/animation

DNEG Animation (formerly known as DNEG Feature Animation) was founded in April 2014 following a collaboration between DNEG and Locksmith Animation. The studio has collaborated with IP creators and filmmakers to deliver animation services for feature-length and episodic animated projects. In its early years, the studio produced a series of shorts in 2018 featuring a Queen's Guard soldier with a giant pencil. DNEG Animation's first full-length animated feature film Ron's Gone Wrong, was theatrically released in 2021 as a co-production with Locksmith Animation, 20th Century Animation for 20th Century Studios. The film won a British Animation Award for "Best Long Form" in 2022. That same year, the short film Mr. Spam Gets A New Hat in 2022, directed by Academy Award-winning filmmaker William Joyce, was released and won numerous awards, including "Best Animation" at the New York Shorts International Film Festival, "Best Animated Short" at the Cleveland International Film Festival, "Best Animation" at the LA Shorts Festival, "Best Animated Short" at the Cordillera International Film Festival and "Best 3D Narrative Short" at the SPARK Animation Festival. Later in 2022, DNEG Animation worked on the Netflix television special Entergalactic, created by Scott "Kid Cudi" Mescudi and Kenya Barris.

In June 2023, the studio released Nimona, an adaptation of the webcomic of the same name by ND Stevenson for Netflix and Annapurna Pictures, released in June 2023. The project had initially begun at Blue Sky Studios, but after its closure by The Walt Disney Company, DNEG Animation took over to bring the film to completion. A few months later, in October 2023, Under the Boardwalk premiered and produced for Paramount Animation. In May 2024, The Garfield Movie was released, with DNEG co-producing alongside Alcon Entertainment for Sony Pictures.

In December 2024, Locksmith Animation's second animated feature film That Christmas (based on the children's Christmas book trilogy That Christmas and Other Stories by Richard Curtis and Rebecca Cobb) was released on Netflix.

Projects currently in production include an adaptation of The Cat in the Hat (2026) with Warner Bros. Pictures Animation, The Angry Birds Movie 3 with Rovio Entertainment and Sega Sammy Group, and two WBPA films for 2027; Bad Fairies with Locksmith Animation and Sketchshark Productions, and Margie Claus with On the Day Productions.

=== ReDefine ===
Launched in 2019, ReDefine delivers visual effects and animation services to studios, filmmakers, and streaming platforms. As part of the DNEG Group, ReDefine has worked on major projects including The Penguin, William Tell, Sky Force, Plankton: The Movie and The Eternaut. ReDefine won its first National Award for its work on Brahmastra - Part One: Shiva and its first Visual Effects Society award for its work on The Penguin.

=== Stereo ===
DNEG Stereo (formerly known as Prime Focus World) was the first in the world to convert a full Hollywood film from 2D to 3D and has since become one of the largest stereo conversion companies in the motion picture industry. DNEG Stereo has delivered immersive 3D experiences for major blockbusters including Dune: Part One, Godzilla x Kong: The New Empire, Venom, Venom: Let There be Carnage, and Venom: The Last Dance. DNEG Stereo also worked on No Time to Die, the first James Bond film ever to be released in 3D.

=== DNEG 360 ===
DNEG 360 is a global, end-to-end virtual production service providing filmmakers and content creators with comprehensive real-time production support. From script breakdown and development to final picture delivery, the team supports every stage of the creative process with cutting-edge real-time production tools. DNEG's Virtual Production work has been featured in films including Andy Serkis' Venom: Let There Be Carnage, Keneth Branagh's Death on the Nile and David Leitch's Bullet Train.

=== DNEG IXP ===
DNEG IXP, launched in 2024, specializes in digital production services across advertising, gaming, music, theme park experiences, retail, and location-based entertainment. DNEG IXP counts amongst its toolsets the AI-driven technologies developed by Brahma, a DNEG Group company. Notable collaborations include working with Moncler on renowned designer Sir Jony Ive's debut apparel collection under Lovefrom, Moncler. The Studio also collaborated with VR firm Practical Magic to produce a cinematic 360-degree VR experience set in the world of Christopher Nolan's action thriller Dunkirk.

== Filmography ==
=== DNEG Visual Effects ===
==== Films ====
===== 1990s and 2000s =====
Year	Title	Director(s)	Distributor(s)	Notes
1999	Whatever Happened to Harold Smith?	Peter Hewitt	Intermedia Films/October Films/West Eleven Films	
2000	Billy Elliot	Stephen Daldry	Universal Pictures/BBC Films/Tiger Aspect Pictures/Working Title Films	
2000	Mission: Impossible 2	John Woo	Paramount Pictures	Installment of the Mission: Impossible (film series)
2000	Nutty Professor II: The Klumps	Peter Segal	Universal Pictures/Imagine Entertainment	Sequel to The Nutty Professor
2000	Pitch Black	David Twohy	USA Films/Gramercy Pictures/Interscope Communications	
2001	Bridget Jones's Diary	Sharon Maguire	Universal Pictures (International)/Miramax Films (United States)/StudioCanal/Working Title Films	
2001	Captain Corelli's Mandolin	John Madden	Universal Pictures (United States)/Miramax Films (International)/StudioCanal/Working Title Films	
2001	Enemy at the Gates	Jean-Jacques Annaud	Paramount Pictures (United States)/Pathé Distribution (France and United Kingdom)/Constanin Film (Germany)/Mandalay Pictures/Repérage Films	
2001	Princess of Thieves	Peter Hewitt	Wonderful World of Disney/Granada Entertainment/ITV Studios Global Entertainment/ABC	TV movie
2001	The Tailor of Panama	John Boorman	Columbia Pictures/Merlin Films	
2002	Anita and Me	Metin Hüseyin	Icon Film Distribution/BBC Films	
2002	Below	David Twohy	Miramax Films/Dimension Films	
2002	Bollywood Queen	Jeremy Wooding	Redbus Film Distribution	
2002	Die Another Day	Lee Tamahori	Metro-Goldwyn-Mayer/Eon Productions	Installment of the James Bond (film series)
2002	Dragonfly	Tom Shadyac	Universal Pictures/Spyglass Entertainment/Buena Vista International	
2002	The Escapist	Gillies MacKinnon	N/A	
2002	The Hours	Stephen Daldry	Paramount Pictures/Miramax Films/Buena Vista International	
2002	Thunderpants	Peter Hewitt	Pathé Distribution	
2003	Cold Mountain	Anthony Minghella	Miramax Films/Mirage Enterprises	
2003	Dreamkeeper	Steve Barron	Hallmark Entertainment	TV movie
2003	Johnny English	Peter Howitt	Universal Pictures/StudioCanal/Working Title Films	
2003	Lara Croft: Tomb Raider – The Cradle of Life	Jan de Bont	Paramount Pictures/Mutual Film Company/Lawrence Gordon Productions	
2003	The League of Extraordinary Gentlemen	Stephen Norrington	20th Century Fox	
2003	To Kill a King	Mike Barker	FilmFour Productions	
2004	A Good Woman	Mike Barker	Lionsgate Films/Vertigo Films	
2004	Agent Cody Banks 2: Destination London	Kevin Allen	Metro-Goldwyn-Mayer	
2004	Alien vs. Predator	Paul W. S. Anderson	20th Century Fox/Davis Entertainment/Brandywine Productions	
2004	Birth	Jonathan Glazer	New Line Cinema	
2004	Bridget Jones: The Edge of Reason	Beeban Kidron	Universal Pictures (International)/Miramax Films (United States)/StudioCanal/Working Title Films	Sequel to Bridget Jones's Diary
2004	The Chronicles of Riddick	David Twohy	Universal Pictures	
2004	Ella Enchanted	Tommy O'Haver	Miramax Films	
2004	Harry Potter and the Prisoner of Azkaban	Alfonso Cuarón	Warner Bros. Pictures/Heyday Films/1492 Pictures	Installment of the Wizarding World (film series)
2004	In My Country	John Boorman	Sony Pictures Classics/Sony Pictures Releasing	
2004	Laws of Attraction	Peter Howitt	New Line Cinema (United States)/Entertainment Film Distributors (United Kingdom)/Mobius Pictures/Intermedia/Deep River Productions/Irish DreamTime/Initial Entertainment Group	
2004	Resident Evil: Apocalypse	Alexander Witt	Sony Pictures Releasing/Screen Gems/Constantin Film	Sequel to Resident Evil
2004	Shaun of the Dead	Edgar Wright	Universal Pictures/StudioCanal/Working Title Films	
2005	Batman Begins	Christopher Nolan	Warner Bros. Pictures/Legendary Pictures/DC Comics	
2005	Doom	Andreaz Johnson	Universal Pictures	
2005	Harry Potter and the Goblet of Fire	Mike Newell	Warner Bros. Pictures/Heyday Films	Installment of the Wizarding World (film series)
2005	The Jacket	John Maybury	Warner Independent Pictures (United States)/Summit Entertainment (International)	
2005	Kingdom of Heaven	Ridley Scott	20th Century Fox/Scott Free Productions	
2005	Pride & Prejudice	Joe Wright	Universal Pictures (International)/Focus Features (United States)/Working Title Films	
2005	Sahara	Breck Eisner	Paramount Pictures (United States)/Summit Entertainment (International)	
2005	V for Vendetta	James McTeigue	Warner Bros. Pictures/Silver Pictures/Virtual Studios/DC Vertigo Comics	
2006	Alex Rider: Stormbreaker	Geoffrey Sax	Entertainment Film Distributors (United Kingdom)/Metro-Goldwyn-Mayer (United States)/The Weinstein Company/Moving Picture Company/Isle of Man Film/Samuelson Productions/UK Film Council	
2006	Casino Royale	Martin Campbell	Metro-Goldwyn-Mayer/Columbia Pictures/Eon Productions/Sony Pictures Releasing	Installment of the James Bond (film series)
2006	Children of Men	Alfonso Cuarón	Universal Pictures	
2006	The Da Vinci Code	Ron Howard	Columbia Pictures/Imagine Entertainment/Sony Pictures Releasing	
2006	Flyboys	Tony Bill	Metro-Goldwyn-Mayer	
2006	The Magic Flute	Kenneth Branagh	Revolver Entertainment	
2006	Penelope	Mark Palansky	Momentum Pictures (United Kingdom)/Summit Entertainment (United States)	
2006	Stranger than Fiction	Marc Forster	Columbia Pictures/Mandate Pictures/Sony Pictures Releasing	
2006	United 93	Paul Greengrass	Universal Pictures	
2006	World Trade Center	Oliver Stone	Paramount Pictures	
2007	Atonement	Joe Wright	Universal Pictures (International)/Focus Features (United States)/Working Title Films	
2007	The Bourne Ultimatum	Paul Greengrass	Universal Pictures	
2007	Grindhouse	Robert Rodriguez	Dimension Films/Troublemaker Studios	
2007	Harry Potter and the Order of the Phoenix	David Yates	Warner Bros. Pictures/Heyday Films	Installment of the Wizarding World (film series)
2007	Hot Fuzz	Edgar Wright	Universal Pictures/Working Title Films	
2007	Love in the Time of Cholera	Mike Newell	New Line Cinema (United States)/Summit Entertainment (International)	
2007	The Reaping	Stephen Hopkins	Warner Bros. Pictures/Village Roadshow Pictures	
2007	Stardust	Matthew Vaughn	Paramount Pictures/Marv Films	
2008	10,000 BC	Roland Emmerich	Warner Bros. Pictures/Legendary Pictures/Centropolis Entertainment	
2008	The Boy in the Striped Pyjamas	Mark Herman	Miramax Films/Heyday Films/BBC Films	
2008	Cloverfield	Matt Reeves	Paramount Pictures/Bad Robot	
2008	The Dark Knight	Christopher Nolan	Warner Bros. Pictures/Legendary Pictures/DC Comics/Syncopy Inc.	
2008	Doomsday	Neil Marshall	Universal Pictures	
2008	The Duchess	Saul Dibb	Pathé Distribution (France and United Kingdom)/Paramount Vantage (United States)/BBC Films	
2008	The Edge of Love	John Maybury	Lionsgate Films/BBC Films	
2008	Franklyn	Gerald McMorrow	Recorded Picture Company/Film4/UK Film Council/HanWay Films	
2008	Hellboy II: The Golden Army	Guillermo del Toro	Universal Pictures	
2008	In Bruges	Martin McDonagh	Universal Pictures (International)/Focus Features (United States)	
2008	Inkheart	Iain Softley	New Line Cinema	
2008	Miss Pettigrew Lives for a Day	Bharat Nalluri	Focus Features	
2008	Quantum of Solace	Marc Forster	Metro-Goldwyn-Mayer/Columbia Pictures/Eon Productions	Installment of the James Bond (film series)
2008	Rudo y Cursi	Carlos Cuarón	Universal Pictures	
2009	2012	Roland Emmerich	Columbia Pictures/Centropolis Entertainment/Sony Pictures Releasing	
2009	Angels and Demons	Ron Howard	Columbia Pictures/Imagine Entertainment/Sony Pictures Releasing	
2009	The Boat That Rocked	Richard Curtis	Universal Pictures/Working Title Films	
2009	Fast & Furious	Justin Lin	Universal Pictures/Original Film	
2009	Harry Potter and the Half-Blood Prince	David Yates	Warner Bros. Pictures/Heyday Films	Installment of the Wizarding World (film series)
2009	Sherlock Holmes	Guy Ritchie	Warner Bros. Pictures/Village Roadshow Pictures/Silver Pictures	
2009	The Soloist	Joe Wright	DreamWorks Pictures/Universal Pictures/Participant Media/Working Title Films/Krasnoff/Foster Entertainment	

===== 2010s =====
Year	Title	Director(s)	Distributor(s)	Notes
2010	Harry Potter and the Deathly Hallows – Part 1	David Yates	Warner Bros. Pictures/Heyday Films	Installment of the Wizarding World (film series)
2010	Green Zone	Paul Greengrass	Universal Pictures	
2010	Inception	Christopher Nolan	Warner Bros. Pictures/Legendary Pictures/Syncopy Inc.	
2010	Iron Man 2	Jon Favreau	Paramount Pictures/Marvel Studios/Fairview Entertainment	Installment of the Marvel Cinematic Universe
2010	Prince of Persia: The Sands of Time	Mike Newell	Walt Disney Pictures/Jerry Bruckheimer Films	
2010	Scott Pilgrim vs. the World	Edgar Wright	Universal Pictures	
2010	The Sorcerer's Apprentice	Jon Turteltaub	Walt Disney Pictures/Jerry Bruckheimer Films	
2010	The Wolfman	Joe Johnston	Universal Pictures	
2011	Attack the Block	Joe Cornish	Optimum Releasing/StudioCanal Features/Film4/UK Film Council/Big Talk Pictures	
2011	Captain America: The First Avenger	Joe Johnston	Paramount Pictures/Marvel Studios	Installment of the Marvel Cinematic Universe
2011	Harry Potter and the Deathly Hallows – Part 2	David Yates	Warner Bros. Pictures/Heyday Films	Installment of the Wizarding World (film series)
2011	Paul	Greg Mottola	Universal Pictures	
2011	The Tree of Life	Terrance Malick	20th Century Fox	
2012	Battleship	Peter Berg	Universal Pictures	
2012	The Bourne Legacy	Tony Gilroy	Universal Pictures	
2012	The Dark Knight Rises	Christopher Nolan	Warner Bros. Pictures/Legendary Pictures/DC Comics/Syncopy Inc.	
2012	John Carter	Andrew Stanton	Walt Disney Pictures	
2012	Les Misérables	Tom Hooper	Universal Pictures/Working Title Films	
2012	The Pirates! Band of Misfits	Peter Lord	Columbia Pictures/Sony Pictures Animation/Aardman Animations/Sony Pictures Releasing	
2012	Skyfall	Sam Mendes	Metro-Goldwyn-Mayer/Columbia Pictures/Eon Productions/Sony Pictures Releasing	Installment of the James Bond (film series)
2012	Snow White and the Huntsman	Rupert Sanders	Universal Pictures/Roth Films	
2012	Total Recall	Len Wiseman	Columbia Pictures/Original Film/Sony Pictures Releasing	
2013	Captain Phillips	Paul Greengrass	Columbia Pictures	
2013	Fast & Furious 6	Justin Lin	Universal Pictures/Original Film	Installment of the Fast & Furious franchise
2013	The Hunger Games: Catching Fire	Francis Lawrence	Lionsgate Films	
2013	Man of Steel	Zack Snyder	Warner Bros. Pictures/Legendary Pictures/DC Comics/Syncopy Inc.	Installment of the DC Extended Universe
2013	Rush	Ron Howard	Universal Pictures (United States)/StudioCanal (United Kingdom)/Cross Creek Pictures/Exclusive Media/Working Title Films/Imagine Entertainment/Revolution Films	
2013	Thor: The Dark World	Alan Taylor	Marvel Studios	Installment of the Marvel Cinematic Universe
2013	The World's End	Edgar Wright	Universal Pictures (International)/Focus Features (United States)/Relativity Media/StudioCanal/Working Title Films/Big Talk Pictures	
2014	Cuban Fury	James Griffiths	StudioCanal	
2014	Ex Machina	Alex Garland	A24 (United States)/Universal Pictures (International)	
2014	Exodus: Gods and Kings	Ridley Scott	20th Century Fox/Scott Free Productions/Chernin Entertainment	
2014	Godzilla	Gareth Edwards	Warner Bros. Pictures/Legendary Pictures/Toho	Installment of the MonsterVerse
2014	Transformers: Age of Extinction	Michael Bay	Paramount Pictures/Hasbro Studios/di Bonaventura Pictures/China Movie Channel/Jiaflix Enterprises	Stereo conversion; Installment of the Transformers franchise
2014	Hercules	Brett Ratner	Paramount Pictures/Metro-Goldwyn-Mayer	
2014	The Hunger Games: Mockingjay – Part 1	Francis Lawrence	Lionsgate Films	
2014	Interstellar	Christopher Nolan	Paramount Pictures (United States)/Warner Bros. Pictures (United Kingdom)/Legendary Pictures/Syncopy Inc.	
2014	Muppets Most Wanted	James Bobin	Walt Disney Pictures/Mandeville Films	
2014	Paddington	Paul King	StudioCanal/Heyday Films	
2014	Transcendence	Wally Pfister	Warner Bros. Pictures (United States and Canada)/Summit Entertainment (International)/Alcon Entertainment	
2015	Ant-Man	Peyton Reed	Marvel Studios	Installment of the Marvel Cinematic Universe
2015	Bridge of Spies	Steven Spielberg	Touchstone Pictures (United States)/20th Century Fox (International)/DreamWorks Pictures/Reliance Entertainment/Amblin Entertainment/Participant Media/Marc Platt Productions	
2015	The Danish Girl	Tom Hooper	Universal Pictures (International)/Focus Features (United States)/Working Title Films	
2015	In the Heart of the Sea	Ron Howard	Warner Bros. Pictures/Village Roadshow Pictures/Imagine Entertainment/Roth Films	
2015	The Divergent Series: Insurgent	Robert Schwentke	Summit Entertainment/Red Wagon Entertainment	
2015	The Hunger Games: Mockingjay – Part 2	Francis Lawrence	Lionsgate Films	
2015	Jupiter Ascending	The Wachowskis	Warner Bros. Pictures/Village Roadshow Pictures	
2015	Mission: Impossible – Rogue Nation	Christopher McQuarrie	Paramount Pictures/Skydance Media/Bad Robot/TC Productions	Installment of the Mission: Impossible (film series)
2015	Spectre	Sam Mendes	Metro-Goldwyn-Mayer/Columbia Pictures/Eon Productions/Sony Pictures Releasing	Installment of the James Bond (film series)
2015	Terminator Genisys	Alan Taylor	Paramount Pictures/Skydance Media	
2016	Alice Through the Looking Glass	James Bobin	Walt Disney Pictures/Roth Films	
2016	Assassin's Creed	Justin Kurzel	20th Century Fox/Regency Enterprises/Ubisoft Motion Pictures/DMC Film/The Kennedy/Marshall Company	
2016	Batman v Superman: Dawn of Justice	Zack Snyder	Warner Bros. Pictures/DC Comics	Installment of the DC Extended Universe
2016	Captain America: Civil War	Anthony and Joe Russo	Marvel Studios	Installment of the Marvel Cinematic Universe
2016	A Cure for Wellness	Gore Verbinski	20th Century Fox/Regency Enterprises/Blind Wink Productions	
2016	Fantastic Beasts and Where to Find Them	David Yates	Warner Bros. Pictures/Heyday Films	Installment of the Wizarding World (film series)
2016	Grimsby	Louis Leterrier	Columbia Pictures/Village Roadshow Pictures/LStar Capital/Big Talk Productions/Working Title Films	
2016	The Huntsman: Winter's War	Cedric Nicolas-Troyan	Universal Pictures/Roth Films/Perfect World Pictures	
2016	Inferno	Ron Howard	Columbia Pictures/Imagine Entertainment	
2016	Jason Bourne	Paul Greengrass	Universal Pictures	
2016	Miss Peregrine's Home for Peculiar Children	Tim Burton	20th Century Fox/Chernin Entertainment	
2016	Star Trek Beyond	Justin Lin	Paramount Pictures/Skydance Media/Bad Robot	
2017	American Assassin	Michael Cuesta	Lionsgate Films/CBS Films/Di Bonaventura Pictures	
2017	Baby Driver	Edgar Wright	TriStar Pictures/Working Title Films/Sony Pictures Releasing	
2017	Blade Runner 2049	Dennis Villeneuve	Warner Bros. Pictures (United States)/Columbia Pictures/Sony Pictures Releasing (International)/Alcon Entertainment/Thunderbird Entertainment/Scott Free Productions	
2017	Dunkirk	Christopher Nolan	Warner Bros. Pictures/Syncopy Inc.	
2017	The Fate of the Furious	F. Gary Gray	Universal Pictures/Original Film/China Film/One Race Films	Installment of the Fast & Furious franchise
2017	Transformers: The Last Knight	Michael Bay	Paramount Pictures/Huahua Media/The Weying Galaxy/The H Collective/Hasbro Studios/di Bonaventura Pictures	Stereo conversion; Installment of the Transformers franchise
2017	Final Portrait	Stanley Tucci	Sony Pictures Classics (United States)/Vertigo Entertainment (International)	
2017	Geostorm	Dean Devlin	Warner Bros. Pictures/Skydance Media/Electric Entertainment	
2017	Hostiles	Scott Cooper	Entertainment Studios Motion Pictures	
2017	Justice League	Zack Snyder	Warner Bros. Pictures/DC Comics	Installment of the DC Extended Universe
2017	Life	Daniel Espinosa	Columbia Pictures/Skydance Media/Sony Pictures Releasing	
2017	The Mummy	Alex Kurtzman	Universal Pictures	
2017	Thor: Ragnarok	Taika Waititi	Marvel Studios	Installment of the Marvel Cinematic Universe
2017	Wonder Woman	Patty Jenkins	Warner Bros. Pictures/DC Comics	Installment of the DC Extended Universe
2018	2.0	S. Shankar	Lyca Productions/Dharma Productions/AA Films	
2018	Alpha	Albert Hughes	Columbia Pictures/Studio 8/Sony Pictures Releasing	
2018	Annihilation	Alex Garland	Paramount Pictures (United States)/Netflix (International)/Skydance Media/Scott Rudin Productions	
2018	Ant-Man and the Wasp	Peyton Reed	Marvel Studios	Installment of the Marvel Cinematic Universe
2018	Aquaman	James Wan	Warner Bros. Pictures/DC Comics	Stereo conversion; Installment of the DC Extended Universe
2018	Avengers: Infinity War	Anthony and Joe Russo	Marvel Studios	Installment of the Marvel Cinematic Universe
2018	Bad Times at the El Royale	Drew Goddard	20th Century Fox	
2018	Black Panther	Ryan Coogler	Marvel Studios	Installment of the Marvel Cinematic Universe
2018	Bohemian Rhapsody	Bryan Singer	20th Century Fox/Regency Enterprises/Bad Hat Harry Productions	
2018	Deadpool 2	David Leitch	20th Century Fox/Marvel Entertainment	
2018	Fantastic Beasts: The Crimes of Grindelwald	David Yates	Warner Bros. Pictures/Heyday Films	
2018	First Man	Damien Chazelle	Universal Pictures/DreamWorks Pictures/Perfect World Pictures/Temple Hill Entertainment	
2018	Holmes & Watson	Etan Cohen	Columbia Pictures/Gary Sanchez Productions/Mosaic Media Group/Mimran Schur Pictures/Sony Pictures Releasing	
2018	The Hurricane Heist	Rob Cohen	Entertainment Studios Motion Pictures/Foresight Unlimited/Parkside Pictures/Windfall Productions/Tadross Media Group	
2018	Mission: Impossible – Fallout	Christopher McQuarrie	Paramount Pictures/Skydance Media/Bad Robot/TC Productions	Installment of the Mission: Impossible (film series)
2018	Mowgli: Legend of the Jungle	Andy Serkis	Netflix/Warner Bros. Pictures	
2018	Pacific Rim: Uprising	Steven S. DeKnight	Universal Pictures/Legendary Pictures	
2018	Red Sparrow	Francis Lawrence	20th Century Fox/Chernin Entertainment	
2018	The 15:17 to Paris	Clint Eastwood	Warner Bros. Pictures/Village Roadshow Pictures	
2018	The Meg	Jon Turteltaub	Warner Bros. Pictures	
2018	Venom	Ruben Fleischer	Columbia Pictures/Marvel Entertainment/Sony Pictures Releasing	
2019	Aladdin	Guy Ritchie	Walt Disney Pictures/Rideback	Stereo conversion
2019	Alita: Battle Angel	Robert Rodriguez	20th Century Fox/Lightstorm Entertainment/Troublemaker Studios	
2019	Avengers: Endgame	Anthony and Joe Russo	Marvel Studios	Installment of the Marvel Cinematic Universe
2019	Fast & Furious Presents: Hobbs & Shaw	David Leitch	Universal Pictures	
2019	Godzilla: King of the Monsters	Michael Dougherty	Warner Bros. Pictures/Legendary Pictures/Toho	Installment of the MonsterVerse
2019	The Kid Who Would Be King	Joe Cornish	20th Century Fox/Working Title Films	
2019	Men in Black: International	F. Gary Gray	Columbia Pictures/Amblin Entertainment/P+M Image Nation/Sony Pictures Releasing	
2019	Shazam!	David F. Sandberg	Warner Bros. Pictures/New Line Cinema/DC Comics	Installment of the DC Extended Universe
2019	War	Siddharth Anand	Yash Raj Films	
2019	Spies in Disguise	Nick Bruno and Troy Quane	20th Century Fox Animation/Blue Sky Studios	Stereo conversion

===== 2020s =====
Year	Title	Director(s)	Distributor(s)	Notes
2020	Mulan	Niki Caro	Walt Disney Pictures	Stereo conversion
2020	The New Mutants	Josh Boone	20th Century Studios/Marvel Entertainment/Kinberg Genre/Sunswept Entertainment	
2020	Tenet	Christopher Nolan	Warner Bros. Pictures/Syncopy Inc.	
2020	Wonder Woman 1984	Patty Jenkins	Warner Bros. Pictures/DC Comics	Installment of the DC Extended Universe
2021	83	Kabir Khan	Reliance Entertainment	
2021	Chaos Walking	Doug Liman	Lionsgate Films	
2021	Dune	Denis Villeneuve	Warner Bros. Pictures/Legendary Pictures	
2021	F9	Justin Lin	Universal Pictures	Installment of the Fast & Furious franchise
2021	Godzilla vs. Kong	Adam Wingard	Warner Bros. Pictures/Legendary Pictures/Toho	Stereo conversion; Installment of the MonsterVerse
2021	Ghostbusters: Afterlife	Jason Reitman	Columbia Pictures/Bron Creative/Ghost Corps/The Montecito Picture Company/Sony Pictures Releasing	Installment of the Ghostbusters franchise
2021	Jungle Cruise	Jaume Collet-Serra	Walt Disney Pictures/Davis Entertainment/Seven Bucks Productions/Flynn Picture Company	Stereo conversion
2021	Last Night in Soho	Edgar Wright	Focus Features/Working Title Films/Film4 Productions/Perfect World Pictures/Complete Fiction Pictures	
2021	The Matrix Resurrections	Lana Wachowski	Warner Bros. Pictures/Village Roadshow Pictures	Installment of The Matrix franchise
2021	No Time to Die	Cary Joji Fukunaga	Metro-Goldwyn-Mayer/Universal Pictures/United Artists Releasing/Eon Productions	Installment of the James Bond (film series)
2021	Venom: Let There Be Carnage	Andy Serkis	Columbia Pictures/Marvel Entertainment/Sony Pictures Releasing	Sequel to Venom
2022	The Adam Project	Shawn Levy	Netflix/Skydance Media/21 Laps Entertainment/Maximum Effort	
2022	Black Adam	Jaume Collet-Serra	Warner Bros. Pictures/DC Comics	Installment of the DC Extended Universe
2022	Brahmāstra: Part One – Shiva	Ayan Mukerji	Star Studios/Prime Focus/Walt Disney Studios Motion Pictures	First installment of the trilogy and Installment of Astraverse
2022	Bullet Train	David Leitch	Columbia Pictures/Sony Pictures Releasing/87North Productions	
2022	Death on the Nile	Kenneth Branagh	20th Century Studios/Scott Free Productions	Sequel to Murder on the Orient Express
2022	Ireland	Greg MacGillivray	MacGillivray Freeman Films	
2022	Jurassic World Dominion	Colin Trevorrow	Universal Pictures/Amblin Entertainment	Stereo conversion; Installment of the Jurassic Park franchise
2022	The Lost City	Adam Nee; Aaron Nee	Paramount Pictures/Fortis Films/3dot Productions/Exhibit A	
2022	Moonfall	Roland Emmerich	Lionsgate Films	
2022	Moonshot	Chris Winterbauer	Warner Bros. Pictures/New Line Cinema/HBO Max	
2022	Pinocchio	Robert Zemeckis	Walt Disney Pictures/Depth of Field Studios/ImageMovers	
2022	RRR	S. S. Rajamouli	DVV Entertainment/Lyca Productions/Pen Studios/KVN Creations/HR Pictures	
2022	Lou	Anna Foerster	Netflix	
2022	The School for Good and Evil	Paul Feig	Netflix/Roth/Kirschenbaum Films	
2022	Devotion	J. D. Dillard	Columbia Pictures/Stage 6 Films/Black Label Media	
2022	Glass Onion: A Knives Out Mystery	Rian Johnson	Netflix/T-Street	Sequel to Knives Out
2022	Slumberland	Francis Lawrence	Netflix/Chernin Entertainment/About:Blank	
2022	Sonic the Hedgehog 2	Jeff Fowler	Paramount Pictures/Sega Sammy Group/Original Film/Marza Animation Planet/Blur Studio	Sequel to Sonic the Hedgehog; Based on the video game series of the same name
2022	Uncharted	Ruben Fleischer	Columbia Pictures/Sony Pictures Releasing/PlayStation Productions/Atlas Entertainment/Arad Productions	Based on the video game series of the same name
2023	Scream VI	Matt Bettinelli-Olpin and Tyler Gillett	Paramount Pictures/Spyglass Media Group/Project X Entertainment/Radio Silence Productions	Installment of the Scream franchise; stereo conversion
2023	Shazam! Fury of the Gods	David F. Sandberg	Warner Bros. Pictures/New Line Cinema/DC Comics	Installment of the DC Extended Universe
2023	Peter Pan & Wendy	David Lowery	Walt Disney Pictures/Roth/Kirschenbaum Films/Whitaker Entertainment	
2023	Fast X	Louis Leterrier	Universal Pictures	Installment of the Fast & Furious franchise
2023	The Little Mermaid	Rob Marshall	Walt Disney Pictures/Lucamar Productions/Marc Platt Productions/5000 Broadway Productions	Stereo conversion
2023	Transformers: Rise of the Beasts	Steven Caple Jr.	Paramount Pictures/Skydance Media/Hasbro/New Republic Pictures/di Bonaventura Pictures/Bayhem Films	Stereo conversion; Installment of the Transformers franchise
2023	The Flash	Andy Muschietti	Warner Bros. Pictures/DC Comics	Installment of the DC Extended Universe
2023	Oppenheimer	Christopher Nolan	Universal Pictures/Syncopy Inc.	
2023	Haunted Mansion	Justin Simien	Walt Disney Pictures/Rideback	
2023	Meg 2: The Trench	Ben Wheatley	Warner Bros. Pictures/CMC Pictures/DF Pictures/di Bonaventura Pictures/Apelles Entertainment	Sequel to The Meg
2023	No One Will Save You	Brian Duffield	20th Century Studios/Star Thrower Entertainment	
2023	Aquaman and the Lost Kingdom	James Wan	Warner Bros. Pictures/DC Comics/Atomic Monster/The Safran Company	Installment of the DC Extended Universe
2024	Lift	F. Gary Gray	Netflix/HartBeat Productions/6th & Idaho Productions	
2024	Fighter	Siddharth Anand	Viacom18 Studios	
2024	No Way Up	Claudio Fäh	Altitude Film Entertainment/Hyprr Films/Ingenious Media/Sarma Films	
2024	Dune: Part Two	Denis Villeneuve	Warner Bros. Pictures/Legendary Pictures	Sequel to Dune
2024	Ghostbusters: Frozen Empire	Gil Kenan	Columbia Pictures/Ghost Corps/Right of Way Films	Installment of the Ghostbusters franchise
2024	Godzilla x Kong: The New Empire	Adam Wingard	Warner Bros. Pictures/Legendary Pictures	Installment of the MonsterVerse
2024	Bade Miyan Chote Miyan	Ali Abbas Zafar	PVR Inox Pictures, Yash Raj Films	
2024	Furiosa: A Mad Max Saga	George Miller	Warner Bros. Pictures/Kennedy Miller Mitchell	
2024	Munjya	Aditya Sarpotdar	Pen Marudhar Entertainment	Third installment in the Maddock Supernatural Universe
2024	Kalki 2898 AD	Nag Ashwin	Vyjayanthi Movies/AA Films/Sri Venkateswara Creations	
2024	Borderlands	Eli Roth	Lionsgate Films/Arad Productions/Picturestart/Gearbox Studios/2K	Based on the video game of the same name
2024	Devara: Part 1	Koratala Siva	Sithara Entertainments/Dharma Productions/AA Films/Wayfarer Films/Sri Lakshmi Movies/Hamsini Entertainment	
2024	Venom: The Last Dance	Kelly Marcel	Columbia Pictures/Marvel Entertainment/Sony Pictures Releasing	Sequel to Venom and Venom: Let There Be Carnage
2025	The Gorge	Scott Derrickson	Apple Original Films/Skydance Media/Crooked Highway	
2025	Mickey 17	Bong Joon Ho	Warner Bros. Pictures/Offscreen/Plan B Entertainment/Kate Street Picture Company	
2025	A Minecraft Movie	Jared Hess	Warner Bros. Pictures/Legendary Pictures/Mojang Studios/Vertigo Entertainment/On the Roam	Stereo conversion; Based on the video game of the same name
2025	How to Train Your Dragon	Dean DeBlois	Universal Pictures/DreamWorks Animation/Marc Platt Productions	Stereo conversion; Based on the franchise of the same name
2025	Heads of State	Ilya Naishuller	Amazon MGM Studios/The Safran Company/Big Indie Pictures	
2025	Dongji Rescue	Fei Zhenxiang; Guan Hu	The Seventh Art Pictures/Tao Piao Piao/Pearl River Film Group/China Film Group Corporation/Beijing Jingxi Cultural Tourism/Trinity Cine Asia	
2025	Eden	Ron Howard	Vertical/Imagine Entertainment/AGC Studios/Library Pictures	
2026	Mercy	Timur Bekmambetov	Amazon MGM Studios/Atlas Entertainment	
2026	Mortal Kombat II	Simon McQuoid	Warner Bros. Pictures/New Line Cinema/Atomic Monster/Broken Road Productions/Fireside Films	Sequel to Mortal Kombat
2026	The Odyssey	Christopher Nolan	Universal Pictures/Syncopy Inc.	
2026	Motor City	Potsy Ponciroli	Black Bear Pictures/Stampede Ventures/Astro Lion Pictures	
2026	Toxic	Geetu Mohandas	KVN Productions/Monster Mind Creations/AA Films/Sri Venkateswara Creations	
2026	Coyote vs. Acme	Dave Green	Ketchup Entertainment/Warner Bros. Pictures/Warner Animation Group/Troll Court Entertainment/Keylight Pictures	
2026	Klara and the Sun	Taika Waititi	Columbia Pictures/Sony Pictures Releasing/3000 Pictures/Heyday Films/Defender Films	
2026	Ramayana: Part 1	Nitesh Tiwari	Sony Pictures Releasing/Dharma Distribution	

===== Upcoming =====
Year	Title	Director(s)	Distributor(s)	Notes
2027	Animal Friends	Peter Atencio	Warner Bros. Pictures/Legendary Pictures/Maximum Effort/Prime Focus Studios	

==== TV series and miniseries ====
Years active	Title	Creator(s)	Original network(s)	Notes
Ongoing series
2017 – present	Strike	Ben Richards and Tom Edge	BBC	
2022 – present	The Gilded Age	Julian Fellowes	HBO	
2022 – present	The Lord of the Rings: The Rings of Power	J. D. Payne and Patrick McKay	Prime Video	
2023 – present	The Last of Us	Craig Mazin and Neil Druckmann	HBO	Based on the video game of the same name
2023 – present	Citadel	Josh Appelbaum and Bryan Oh	Prime Video	
2024–present	Avatar: The Last Airbender	Albert Kim	Netflix	Based on the animated series of the same name
Completed series
2011 – 2019	The Amazing World of Gumball	Ben Bocquelet	Cartoon Network	Animated series.
2012	The Hollow Crown	Rupert Goold, Ben Power, Richard Eyre and Dominic Cooke	BBC Two (United Kingdom); PBS (United States)	
2013 – 2016	Mr Selfridge	Andrew Davies	PBS (United States); ITV (International)	Series two–four only.
2014 – 2016; 2018	Death in Paradise	Robert Thorogood	BBC One (United Kingdom); France 2 (France)	Series three, four, five and seven only.
2014	Remember Me	Gwyneth Hughes	BBC One	Miniseries.
2014 – 2026	Outlander	Ronald D. Moore	Starz	
2015 – 2016	Agent Carter	Christopher Markus and Stephen McFeely	ABC	Set in the Marvel Cinematic Universe (MCU).
2015	Arthur & George	Ed Whitmore	ITV	Miniseries.
2015	Bluestone 42	Richard Hurst and James Cary	BBC Three	Series three only.
2015	Childhood's End	Matthew Graham	Syfy	Miniseries.
2015 – 2016	Home Fires	Simon Block	ITV Studios	
2015	Jekyll and Hyde	Charlie Higson	ITV	
2015	London Spy	Tom Rob Smith	BBC Two	Miniseries.
2015	River	Abi Morgan	BBC One	Miniseries.
2016	Hooten & the Lady	Tony Jordan, James Payne, Sarah Phelps, Jeff Povey and Richard Zajdlic	Sky One	
2016	Love, Nina	Nick Hornby	BBC One	
2016	Plebs	Tom Basden, Caroline Leddy, Sam Leifer and Teddy Leifer	ITV2	Series three only.
2016 – 2018	Stan Lee's Lucky Man	Stan Lee and Neil Biswas	Sky One	
2016	The Tunnel	Ben Richards and Hans Rosenfeldt	Canal+	Series Two: Sabotage only.
2016	The Young Pope	Paolo Sorrentino	Sky Atlantic (Italy); HBO (United States); Canal+ (France)	Miniseries.
2017	Black Mirror	Charlie Brooker	Netflix	Only the episode, "Metalhead".
2017	Emerald City	Matthew Arnold and Josh Friedman	NBC	
2017	Inhumans	Scott Buck	ABC	Set in the Marvel Cinematic Universe (MCU).
2017 – 2019	Harlots	Alison Newman and Moira Buffini	ITV Encore; Starzplay (United Kingdom); Hulu (United States)	
2017 – 2018	Philip K. Dick's Electric Dreams	Ronald D. Moore and Michael Dinner	Channel 4	
2017 – 2020	Riviera	Neil Jordan	Sky Atlantic	
2017	Will	Craig Pearce	TNT	
2018 – 2019	Krypton	David S. Goyer	Syfy	
2018 – 2020	Altered Carbon	Laeta Kalogridis	Netflix	
2018 – 2022	Doctor Who	Sydney Newman, C. E. Webber and Donald Wilson	BBC One	Series eleven, twelve, thirteen
2020 – 2022	Westworld	Jonathan Nolan and Lisa Joy	HBO	Season three – Season four
2022 – 2023	Our Flag Means Death	David Jenkins	HBO Max	
2022 – 2025	Stranger Things	The Duffer Brothers	Netflix	Season four – Season five
2023	American Born Chinese	Kelvin Yu	Disney+	
2024	Those About to Die	Roland Emmerich and Robert Rodat	Peacock	
2024 – 2025	Star Wars: Skeleton Crew	Jon Watts and Christopher Ford	Disney+	

=== DNEG Animation ===
==== Films ====
===== 2020s =====
Year	Title	Director(s)	Distributor	Note
2021	Ron's Gone Wrong	Sarah Smith and Jean-Philippe Vine	20th Century Studios	Feature animation
2022	Entergalactic	Scott "Kid Cudi" Mescudi and Kenya Barris	Netflix	Feature animation and production company
2023	Nimona	Nick Bruno and Troy Quane	Netflix	Feature animation (originally produced by Blue Sky Studios)
2023	Under the Boardwalk	David Soren	Paramount Pictures	Feature animation
2023	Trolls Band Together	Walt Dohrn	Universal Pictures	Additional animation
2024	The Garfield Movie	Mark Dindal	Sony Pictures Releasing	Feature animation and production company under Prime Focus Studios
2024	That Christmas	Simon Otto	Netflix	Feature animation
2026	The Cat in the Hat	Erica Rivinoja and Alessandro Carloni	Warner Bros. Pictures	Feature animation

===== Upcoming =====
Year	Title	Director(s)	Distributor	Note
2026	The Angry Birds Movie 3	John Rice	Paramount Pictures	Feature animation and production company under Prime Focus Studios
2027	Ally	Bong Joon Ho	Neon	Feature animation
2027	CoComelon: The Movie	Kathleen Thorson Good	Universal Pictures	Feature animation and production company under Prime Focus Studios
2027	Bad Fairies	Megan Nicole Dong	Warner Bros. Pictures	Feature animation
2027	Margie Claus	Kirk DeMicco	Warner Bros. Pictures	Feature animation
2027	Snoopy Unleashed	Steve Martino	Apple TV	Feature animation
TBA	The Garfield Movie 2	Mark Dindal	Sony Pictures Releasing	Feature animation and production company under Prime Focus Studios
TBA	The Great Gatsby	William Joyce	TBA	Feature animation

==== Short films ====
Year	Title	Director	Distributor(s)	Note
2022	Mr. Spam Gets A New Hat	William Joyce	—N/a	Feature animation and production company
2025	Cardboard	J.P. Vine	—N/a	Feature animation and production company with Ritzy Animation
2026	Daffy Season	Todd Wilderman; Hamish Grieve	Warner Bros. Pictures	Feature animation

== Prime Focus Studios ==
Prime Focus Studios is an entertainment production and financing company founded by filmmaker and producer Namit Malhotra. It finances and develops film, TV, and gaming content and is the entertainment division of Prime Focus Limited.

=== Filmography ===
==== Films ====
Year	Title	Director(s)	Distributor(s)	Notes	Ref
2022	Brahmāstra: Part One - Shiva	Ayan Mukerji	Star Studios/Dharma Productions/Starlight Pictures/Magic Wand Films	First installment of the trilogy and Installment of Astraverse	
2024	Fighter	Siddharth Anand	Viacom18 Studios/Marflix Pictures		
2024	The Garfield Movie	Mark Dindal	Columbia Pictures/Alcon Entertainment/DNEG Animation/Wayfarer Studios/One Cool Films/John Cohen Productions/Andrews McMeel Entertainment	Based on the comic strip of the same name	
2025	William Tell	Nick Hamm	Samuel Goldwyn Films/Free Turn Films/Tempo Productions/Beta Cinema		
2025	Sky Force	Sandeep Kewlani; Abhishek Anil Kapur	PVR Inox Pictures/Jio Studios/Maddock Films/Leo Films		
2025	Eden	Ron Howard	Vertical/Imagine Entertainment/AGC Studios/Library Pictures International/Medan Productions	Uncredited	
2026	Motor City	Potsy Ponciroli	Independent Film Company/Stampede Ventures		
2026	Ramayana: Part 1	Nitesh Tiwari	Sony Pictures Releasing/Dharma Distribution		

==== Upcoming ====
Year	Title	Director(s)	Distributor(s)	Notes	Ref
2026	Above the Below	Idris Elba; Martin Owen	Lionsgate/Future Artists Entertainment		
2026	The Angry Birds Movie 3	John Rice	Paramount Pictures/Rovio Entertainment/Sega Sammy Group/One Cool Films/Flywheel Media/Dentsu	Third installment in the Angry Birds movie franchise	
2027	Animal Friends	Peter Atencio	Warner Bros. Pictures/Legendary Pictures/Maximum Effort		
2027	CoComelon: The Movie	Kat Good	Universal Pictures/DreamWorks Animation/Moonbug Entertainment/Flywheel Media	Based on the franchise of the same name	

==== Undated films ====
Year	Title	Director(s)	Distributor(s)	Notes	Ref
2027	Blood on Snow	Cary Joji Fukunaga	Sky Cinema/Department M/Redpoint Productions/Hardy Son & Baker	Based on the novel of the same name	
2027	Ramayana: Part 2	Nitesh Tiwari	Sony Pictures Releasing/Dharma Distribution	Sequel to Ramayana: Part 1	
TBA	Black Palace	Nick Hamm	New Regency/Tempo Productions/SIMIA Productions/Hamm4 and Simia		
TBA	The Garfield Movie 2	Mark Dindal	Columbia Pictures/Alcon Entertainment/DNEG Animation/Wayfarer Studios/One Cool Films/John Cohen Productions/Andrews McMeel Entertainment	Sequel to The Garfield Movie	

==== TV series ====
Years active	Title	Creator	Original network	Notes	Ref
2024	Those About to Die	Robert Rodat	Peacock	Based on the novel of the same name	
