= Bill Damaschke =

American film producer

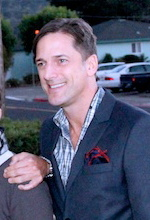
- Damaschke in 2012 at the Rise of the Guardians premiere
- Born: William Damaschke; November 20, 1963 (age 63); Chicago, Illinois, U.S.
- Education: Illinois Wesleyan University
- Occupation: Film producer
- Years active: 1994–present
- Employers: Walt Disney Animation Studios (1994–1995); DreamWorks Animation (1995–2015); Skydance Animation (2017–2019); StoryKey Entertainment (2019–2023); Warner Bros. Pictures Animation (2023–2026)
- Title: CCO of DreamWorks Animation; President of Skydance Animation; Co-founder of StoryKey Entertainment; President and CCO of Warner Bros. Pictures Animation

William Damaschke (born November 20, 1963) is an American film executive and producer. He spent 20 years at DreamWorks Animation, most recently as Chief Creative Officer, where he was involved in the creative, artistic, and operational direction of the company. His tenure oversaw the release of some of the company's big franchise films, including Madagascar, Kung Fu Panda, How to Train Your Dragon and The Croods. He also oversaw all of DreamWorks's live theatrical productions, including the award-winning Shrek the Musical. Damaschke's other projects as a producer include the Broadway musical The Prom, directed and choreographed by Casey Nicholaw, which played at the Longacre Theatre from 15 November 2018 to 11 August 2019; the Broadway-bound musical Half Time, directed and choreographed by Jerry Mitchell, which was presented at the Paper Mill Playhouse in Spring of 2018; and the stage adaptation of Moulin Rouge, directed by Alex Timbers, on which Damaschke serves as executive producer. He was also the president of Skydance Animation for two years and the president of Warner Bros. Pictures Animation for three years.

== Early life ==
Damaschke is the oldest of seven children, and grew up in Chicago. He attended St. Bruno Catholic Elementary and Argo Community High School, and graduated at the School of Theatre Arts at Illinois Wesleyan University.

== Professional career ==
Initially, Damaschke pursued a career in musical theater, working on Godspell in New York, but soon ended up in Los Angeles as a production assistant on Disney's Pocahontas in 1994. In 1995, he joined DreamWorks Studios as a production assistant on The Prince of Egypt. He then moved on to become head of creative production in 1999 and head of creative production and development in 2005. Damaschke served as a producer of Shark Tale (nominated for an Academy Award for Best Animated Feature in 2004) and an executive producer of Over the Hedge and Kung Fu Panda. In 2011, he became chief creative officer (CCO) of DreamWorks Animation, running "the factory floor, working with directors, writers and artists," and "calling the creative shots". He was also president of DreamWorks Live Theatricals, and produced Tony Award-winning, but financially unremarkable, Shrek the Musical. In 2013, The New York Times called him "one of the film industry's most important executives". In January 2015, Damaschke stepped down from his position as Chief Creative Officer at DreamWorks to pursue other interests including: theatrical productions; animated television movies, web series, and live action films. In October 2017, he became the president of Animation and Family Entertainment for Skydance Media. He would also continue operating his StoryKey Entertainment theatrical production company. In January 2019, Damaschke was replaced by John Lasseter as the CCO of Skydance Animation. On February 9, 2023, Warner Animation Group was reported to be in talks with him to lead after the departure of Allison Abbate. On May 5, 2023, it was confirmed in a Warner Bros. Discovery earnings call by CEO David Zaslav that Damaschke had been hired, and was hard at work with Warner Bros. Pictures Group co-CEOs Mike De Luca and Pam Abdy on developing a new slate of films. On November 17, 2026, a month after Warner Bros. Discovery was acquired by Paramount Skydance, it was announced that Damaschke would step down from WBPA.

== Personal life ==
Damaschke lives with John McIlwee, a top Hollywood business manager, in Hollywood Hills, in a 1962 house designed by John Lautner, which they bought in 2002 for $1.3 million and renovated for an additional $1 million. They sold Garcia House to Nicholas Pritzker in 2023

== Filmography ==
Year	Title	Role
1995	Pocahontas	Production office assistant
1998	The Prince of Egypt	Production manager
2000	The Road to El Dorado	Co-executive producer
2002	Spirit: Stallion of the Cimarron	Special thanks
2003	Sinbad: Legend of the Seven Seas	Special thanks
2004	Shrek 2	Special thanks
2004	Shark Tale	Producer
2005	Madagascar	Special thanks
2005	Wallace & Gromit: The Curse of the Were-Rabbit	Special thanks
2006	Over the Hedge	Executive producer
2006	Flushed Away	Special thanks
2007	Shrek the Third	Special thanks
2007	Bee Movie	Special thanks
2008	Kung Fu Panda	Executive producer
2008–present	Shrek the Musical	Producer
2016	Kung Fu Panda 3	Special thanks
2016	Trolls	Special thanks
2017	The Boss Baby	Special thanks
2020	The Prom	Executive Producer
2026	The Cat in the Hat	Excutive Producer and Warner Bros. Pictures Animation senior leadership
2027	Bad Fairies	Warner Bros. Pictures Animation senior leadership
2027	Margie Claus	Warner Bros. Pictures Animation senior leadership
2028	Oh, The Places You'll Go!	Warner Bros. Pictures Animation senior leadership
2028	Dynamic Duo	Warner Bros. Pictures Animation senior leadership
2028	Untitled Hello Kitty film	Warner Bros. Pictures Animation senior leadership
2028	The Lunar Chronicles	Warner Bros. Pictures Animation senior leadership
