= David Derrick Jr. =

American film director

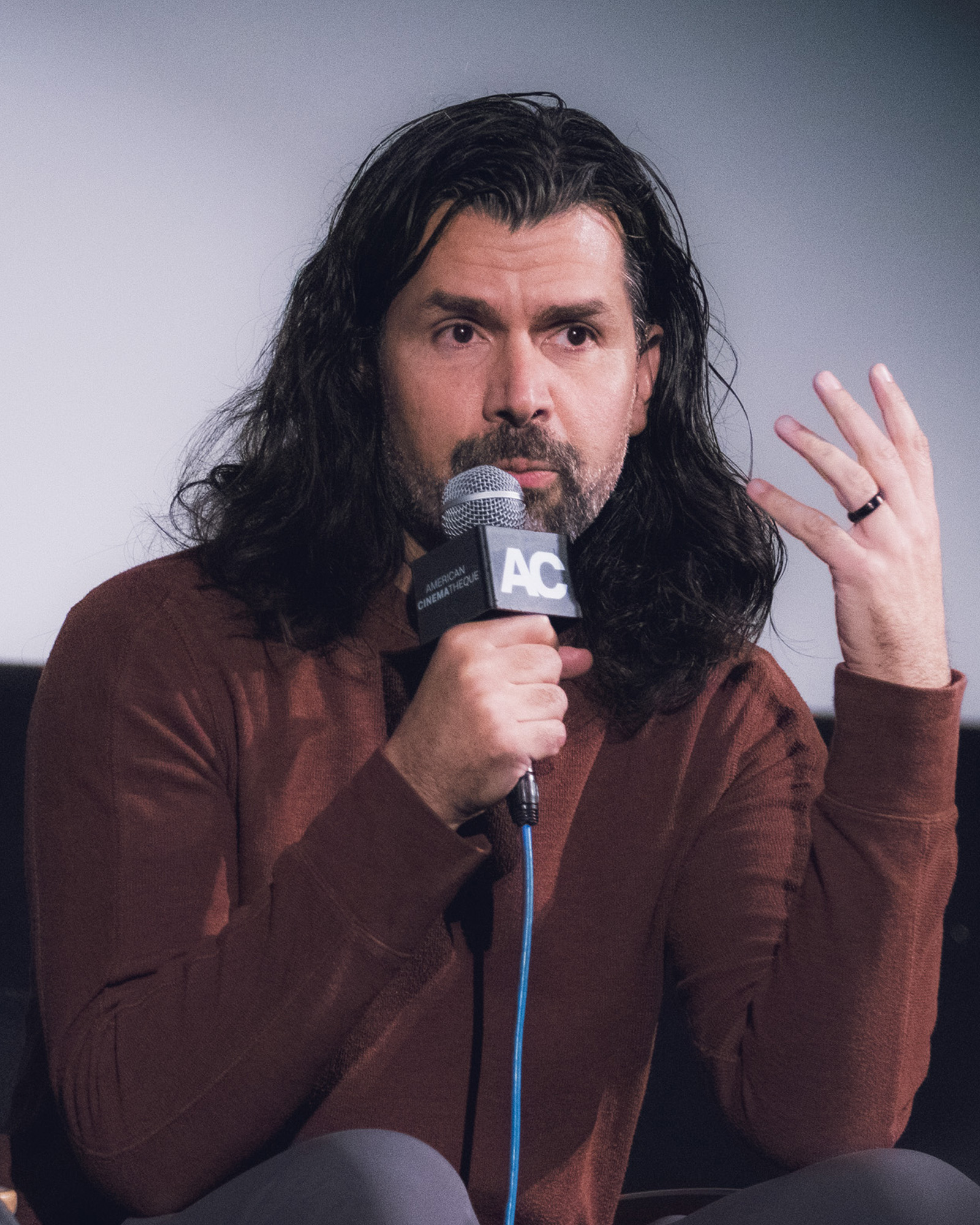
- Derrick in 2024
- Occupations: Film director; storyboard artist
- Years active: 2005–present
- Employers: DreamWorks Animation (2005–2013); Walt Disney Animation Studios (2015–2025); Warner Bros. Pictures Animation (2025–present)

David G. Derrick Jr. is an American film director and storyboard artist. He is best known for his work at Disney, including co-directing Moana 2 (2024).

== Early life and education ==
Derrick attended University of Utah from 1998 to 2000, where he studied fine arts, later studied animation in California Institute of the Arts from 2001 to 2004.

== Career ==
Derrick began working as a storyboard artist at DreamWorks Animation, such as Flushed Away, Bee Movie, How to Train Your Dragon, Megamind, and Rise of the Guardians, before leaving DreamWorks and joining Walt Disney Animation Studios to continued as a storyboard artist for Moana, Raya and the Last Dragon, Encanto and Strange World.

He made his directorial debut with the sequel to Moana, Moana 2, alongside Jason Hand, and Dana Ledoux Miller.

He left Walt Disney Animation Studios and joined Warner Bros. Pictures Animation to serve as a director for an untitled Hello Kitty film, and an untitled original film of his own.

== Filmography ==
Year	Title	Director	Story Artist	Notes
2006	Flushed Away	No	Yes	
2007	Bee Movie	No	Yes	
2010	How to Train Your Dragon	No	Yes	
2010	Megamind	No	Yes	
2012	Rise of the Guardians	No	Yes	
2016	Moana	No	Yes	
2019	The Lion King	No	Yes	
2021	Raya and the Last Dragon	No	Yes	
2021	Encanto	No	Yes	
2022	Strange World	No	Yes (Head of Story)	
2024	Moana 2	Yes	No	Co-directed with Jason Hand and Dana Ledoux Miller
2028	Untitled Hello Kitty film	Yes	No	Co-directed with John Aoshima
TBA	Untitled Warner Bros. Pictures Animation film	Yes	No	
