= Serrana Su-Ling Bliss =

British child actress (born 2009)

Serrana Su-Ling Bliss (born c. 2009) is a British child actress.

Bliss began training in martial arts, particularly kung fu, at a young age, and was a student at the Shaolin Temple UK. Her martial arts skills led to her first acting role in a commercial for the Lawn Tennis Association. Her first film role was in Kenneth Branagh's Belfast (2021), and in September 2021 was cast in Enola Holmes 2 (2022). She will next have a voice role in Bad Fairies (2027).

On television, Bliss appeared in the HBO series Industry, and in March 2026 was cast as Alicia Spinnet in the Harry Potter television series.

On stage, Bliss appeared in School of Rock and as young Cosette in Les Misérables.

== Filmography ==
=== Film ===
Year	Title	Role	Notes
2021	Belfast	Sharon Nicholas	
2022	Matilda the Musical	Child Ensemble	
2022	Enola Holmes 2	Bessie Chapman	
2023	The Boys in the Boat	Kid Fan at Station	
2027	Bad Fairies †	Fei	Voice role, in production

=== Television ===
Year	Title	Role	Notes
2023	Sex Education	Young O	2 episodes
2026	Industry	Lily Tao	3 episodes
2026	Harry Potter †	Alicia Spinnet	Upcoming series

== Stage ==
Year	Title	Role	Theatre
2019	Les Misérables	Young Cosette	Queen's Theatre
2019-2020	School of Rock	Summer Hathaway	Gillian Lynne Theatre
