= Warner Bros. Pictures Animation =

American theatrical animation studio

- Logo used since 2024
- Formerly: Warner Animation Group (2013–2023; 2026)
- Type: Division
- Industry: Animation; Motion pictures
- Predecessor: Turner Feature Animation; Warner Bros. Feature Animation
- Founded: January 7, 2013; 13 years ago
- Founder: Jeff Robinov (as Warner Animation Group); Bill Damaschke (as Warner Bros Pictures Animation)
- Headquarters: 4000 Warner Boulevard, Burbank, California, U.S.
- Key people: Bill Damaschke (president); Chris Leahy (executive vice president)
- Products: Animated films
- Parent: Warner Bros. Pictures
- Subsidiaries: Swaybox Studios
- Website: warnerbrospicturesanimation.com

Warner Bros. Pictures Animation (Note: Pronounced "Warner Brothers Pictures Animation" and sometimes referred as "Warner Bros. Feature Animation") (WBPA), formerly known as Warner Animation Group (WAG), is an American animation studio that serves as the animated feature film label of Warner Bros.' theatrical film production and distribution division, Warner Bros. Pictures. Established in January 2013, the studio is the successor to the traditional animation studio Warner Bros. Feature Animation, which dissolved in 2004, and is also a sister to the regular Warner Bros. Animation studio.

The studio has produced 12 feature films, its first being The Lego Movie, which was released on February 7, 2014, and the most recent being The Cat in the Hat, which was released on November 6, 2026. Films produced by WBPA have grossed a total of $2 billion at the box-office. The Lego Movie is the studio's most commercially successful franchise, while the aforementioned The Lego Movie (2014), The Lego Batman Movie (2017), Smallfoot (2018), The Lego Movie 2: The Second Part (2019), DC League of Super-Pets (2022) and Coyote vs. Acme (2026) are among the studio's most critically acclaimed films to date.

== History ==
=== As Warner Animation Group ===
On January 7, 2013, Jeff Robinov (then head of the studio's motion picture division) founded a screenplay development department, nicknamed a "think tank" for developing theatrical animated films, known as Warner Animation Group. The group includes John Requa, Glenn Ficarra, Nicholas Stoller, Jared Stern, Phil Lord and Christopher Miller. Warner Bros. created the group with the hope that the box office reception of their films will be competitive with other animation studios' releases.

On February 7, 2014, Warner Animation Group released their first film, The Lego Movie, a film animated by Animal Logic, which also provided the animation for both spin-offs. It was met with critical praise and proved to be a box-office success. Due to the movie's success, a media franchise was created, with two spin-offs, The Lego Batman Movie and The Lego Ninjago Movie (both 2017), and a sequel, The Lego Movie 2: The Second Part (2019). While The Lego Batman Movie proved to be successful at the box office, The Lego Ninjago Movie and The Lego Movie 2: The Second Part were both unable to recoup its budget, with Ninjago being the first film from Warner Animation Group to be a box-office flop.

WAG's second film, Storks, was released September 23, 2016. It received mixed reviews from critics. On December 14, 2017, Warner Bros. announced Allison Abbate had been named Executive Vice President, and Chris Leahy has been named Senior Vice President.

The WAG shield used as the print logo from 2014 to 2021; extensively used in trailers, briefly revived for Coyote vs. Acme in 2026

Smallfoot, released September 28, 2018, received mostly positive reviews from critics and became a box office success. In October 2019, Locksmith Animation formed a multi-year production deal with Warner Bros. Pictures and Warner Animation Group, which will distribute Locksmith's films.

An animated reboot of the Scooby-Doo film series titled Scoob! was initially set for a theatrical release on May 15, 2020, but then it was delayed due to the COVID-19 pandemic. On April 21, 2020, it was announced that it would instead go to video on demand in response to the pandemic. It received mixed reviews from critics. A Christmas-themed spin-off prequel, titled Scoob! Holiday Haunt, was set for release on HBO Max in December 2022. The film, despite being close to completion by that August, was shelved by parent company Warner Bros. Discovery, citing cost-cutting measures. Although it was used as a tax write-off, the film was eventually finished that November, even though there were no present plans to release it.

Former logo as Warner Animation Group used from 2021 to 2023.

A live-action/animated hybrid film based on Tom & Jerry was released internationally on February 11, 2021, and in the United States on February 26, simultaneously in theaters and on HBO Max. The film also marked the debut of the company's new logo, made to match the November 2019 refresh of the Warner Bros. shield that itself debuted a month prior in Locked Down. It received generally negative reviews from critics, and is the first film from the company to have met so.

Space Jam: A New Legacy, starring LeBron James, was released on July 16, 2021, and was the first film from Warner Animation Group to incorporate traditional animation. It also received negative reviews from critics, due to its extensive product placement of WarnerMedia's intellectual properties.

DC League of Super-Pets, an animated film based on DC Comics characters starring Dwayne Johnson and Kevin Hart as Krypto the Superdog and Ace the Bat-Hound, respectively, was released on July 29, 2022. It received generally positive reviews from critics.

Unused logo for the then-renamed animation studio in 2023.

Coyote vs. Acme, a live-action/animated hybrid film based on Looney Tunes and Merrie Melodies character Wile E. Coyote, was released on August 28, 2026. Initially scheduled for release on July 2023, the film was shelved that November, citing financial reasons similar to those that befell Scoob! Holiday Haunt the year prior. Following industry-wide backlash, the film's creative team was allowed to shop it around to potential distributors. Ketchup Entertainment would acquire worldwide rights in March 2025, with an intent to release it in 2026. The film marks the final use of the Warner Animation Group label.

=== As Warner Bros. Pictures Animation ===
Following the merger with Discovery, Inc., CEO David Zaslav stated in June 2022 that the division would become its own entity under the Warner Bros. Motion Picture Group, similar to sister companies New Line Cinema and DC Films. It was announced that August that Allison Abbate would be departing the studio.

On February 9, 2023, it was reported that former DreamWorks Animation chief creative officer Bill Damaschke was in talks to lead the studio. On May 5, 2023, it was confirmed in an earnings call by Zaslav that Damaschke had been hired, and was hard at work with Warner Bros. Pictures Group co-CEOs Michael De Luca and Pamela Abdy on developing a new slate of films. On June 9, 2023, Damaschke announced the rebranding of the division into Warner Bros. Pictures Animation and stated that they planned to follow the creative lead of Abdy and De Luca.

The Cat in the Hat, a feature adaptation of Dr. Seuss' book of the same name, was released on November 6, 2026. Written and directed by Alessandro Carloni and Erica Rivinoja, the film stars Bill Hader as the titular character. The project marks the beginning of a strategic partnership with Dr. Seuss Enterprises.

Daffy Season, a short film featuring Looney Tunes and Merrie Melodies characters Daffy Duck and Elmer Fudd, was attached to screenings of The Cat in the Hat. Todd Wilderman and Hamish Grieve directed the film, which saw its world premiere during the studio's presentation at the 2026 Annecy International Animation Film Festival. It was first teased as a "super-secret project" of high priority within WBPA.

In November 2026, following the acquisition of Warner Bros. Discovery by Paramount Skydance, it was announced that Damaschke would be stepping down as part of a leadership restructuring. Jennifer Dodge and Traci Balthazor, heads of Paramount Animation, will have interim oversight of operations in both studios, reporting to Skydance Motion Picture Group co-CEOs Dana Goldberg and Josh Greenstein.

==== Upcoming releases ====
In June 2023, following the studio's rebranding to WBPA, a first-look deal with independent British studio Locksmith Animation was announced. The first film under this partnership is a musical-comedy titled Bad Fairies, directed by Megan Nicole Dong from a script by Deborah Frances-White. The film is currently scheduled to release on May 21, 2027.

A Christmas film titled Margie Claus is currently scheduled to be released on November 12, 2027, with Melissa McCarthy to star and produce. Kirk DeMicco is directing the film, while Ben Falcone and Pilar Flynn serve as producers. Falcone also co-wrote the script with Damon Jones. The project was previously set up as a live-action feature at New Line Cinema.

An adaptation of Oh, the Places You'll Go! is set to be the second film of WBPA's partnership with Dr. Seuss Enterprises. The film is currently scheduled for a March 17, 2028 release, with Jon M. Chu and Jill Culton directing from a screenplay by Rob Lieber. J.J. Abrams (through his company Bad Robot Productions) and Gregg Taylor will produce.

A feature based on Hello Kitty is scheduled to be released on July 21, 2028 in collaboration with sister company New Line Cinema, Sanrio and FlynnPictureCo.

In collaboration with sister company DC Studios and puppet animation studio Swaybox, WBPA is developing Dynamic Duo, directed by Arthur Mintz and written by Matthew Aldrich. An origin story for the characters Dick Grayson (Nightwing) and Jason Todd (Red Hood), the film is "a mix of animation, puppetry and CG". The project is currently scheduled to be released on September 22, 2028.

A feature adaptation of Marissa Meyer's fantasy book series The Lunar Chronicles was announced as the second film in development under the Locksmith Animation deal. Noëlle Raffaele is directing from a screenplay by Kalen Egan and Travis Sentell. The film is scheduled to be released on November 3, 2028.

A spin-off of The Cat in the Hat, focusing on characters Thing One and Thing Two, was reported to be in development in October 2020. No further details have been disclosed.

Meet the Flintstones, an origin story for the Hanna-Barbera characters, was announced to be in development along with the studio's rebranding to WBPA. It is being directed by Wilderman and Grieve from a screenplay by Aaron Horvath and Michael Jelenic.

Meerkats, a photorealistic feature adaptation of the Animal Planet series Meerkat Manor, was announced to be in development in April 2024. Colin Trevorrow is attached to direct the project, with Seth Green and Tracy Falco producing. Series creator Caroline Hawkins and Claire Birks from Oxford Scientific Films will serve as executive producers.

A feature adaptation of Emily the Strange is in development with Pamela Ribon set to write the screenplay. Bad Robot will co-produce the film, with Rob Reger, the character's creator, serving as executive producer alongside Trevor Duke-Moretz.

A new feature based on Tom and Jerry is in the works, with Rashida Jones, Will McCormack and Michael Govier penning the script.

In January 2026, it was announced that Jorge R. Gutiérrez would direct an animated film based on Looney Tunes and Merrie Melodies character Speedy Gonzales.

In April 2026, a feature adaptation of Zac Gorman's book series Thisby Thestoop was announced to be in development at the studio. Steve Desmond and Michael Sherman are attached to write a screenplay based on the series' first book, Thisby Thestoop and the Black Mountain.

On June 22, 2026, during WBPA's Annecy presentation, three projects were announced to be in development: two new films based on The Powerpuff Girls and ThunderCats, respectively, as well as Prehistoria, an original feature made in co-production with independent animation studio SpindleHorse, with Vivienne Medrano attached as director and writer.

A new feature based on Looney Tunes is in the works, described as "a heist film in the vein of Ocean's Eleven".

A sequel to The Cat in the Hat is under consideration, but would depend on the film's reception.

== Process ==
Similar to 20th Century Animation, Paramount Animation and Sony Pictures Animation, Warner Bros. Pictures Animation outsources their computer-animated films' production to other studios such as Animal Logic (The Lego Movie franchise, DC League of Super-Pets and Toto), Sony Pictures Imageworks (Storks and Smallfoot), Reel FX Creative Studios (Scoob!), Framestore (Tom & Jerry), Industrial Light & Magic (Space Jam: A New Legacy) and DNEG (Coyote vs. Acme, The Cat in the Hat, Bad Fairies and Margie Claus). Of this list, two films - Space Jam: A New Legacy and Coyote vs. Acme - include hand-drawn animation. In Space Jam's case, the animation is done in-house and also outsourced from Company 3 Animation and Tonic DNA, while the traditional animation for Coyote vs. Acme was done by Duncan Animation.

The budgets for their films tend to range from $60–80 million. Their most expensive films to date are The Lego Movie 2: The Second Part ($99 million), Scoob! ($90 million), Space Jam: A New Legacy ($150 million), and DC League of Super-Pets ($90 million).

The screenplay department is reportedly somewhat similar to Pixar Animation Studios' "brain trust" in terms of how its members consult with one another and give feedback on each other's projects. The group is nicknamed the "think tank".

== Filmography ==
Release timeline
2014	The Lego Movie
2015
2016	Storks
2017	The Lego Batman Movie
2017	The Lego Ninjago Movie
2018	Smallfoot
2019	The Lego Movie 2: The Second Part
2020	Scoob
2021	Tom & Jerry
2021	Space Jam: A New Legacy
2022	DC League of Super-Pets
2023
2024
2025
2026	Coyote vs. Acme (Note: Warner Bros. Pictures Animation used the Warner Animation Group logo as the film completed production before the studio changed to its current name.)
2026	The Cat in the Hat
2027	Bad Fairies
2027	Margie Claus
2028	Oh, the Places You'll Go!
2028	Hello Kitty
2028	Dynamic Duo
2028	The Lunar Chronicles

=== Franchises ===
Title	Films	Short films	Release dates
The Lego Movie	4	11	2014–2019
DC	2	0	2017–present
Scooby-Doo	1	0	2020-present
Tom & Jerry	1	0	2021–present
Looney Tunes	2	1	2021–present
Dr. Seuss	1	0	2026–present

== See also ==
- Skydance Animation
- Nickelodeon Animation Studios
- Cartoon Network Studios
- Williams Street
- Hanna-Barbera Studios Europe
- List of Warner Bros. theatrical animated feature films
