= Daffy Season =

2026 animated short film

- Theatrical promotional poster
- Directed by: Todd Wilderman; Hamish Grieve
- Written by: Jenny Jaffe; Todd Wilderman; Hamish Grieve
- Produced by: Susan Slagle Rogers
- Starring: Eric Bauza (Note: Posthumous theatrical release); Jeff Bergman; Gabriel Iglesias; Jeannie Tirado
- Edited by: David L. Mendel
- Music by: Tom Howe
- Production company: Warner Bros. Pictures Animation (Note: Overseas animation production by DNEG Animation)
- Distributed by: Warner Bros. Pictures
- Release dates: June 22, 2026 (Annecy); November 6, 2026 (with The Cat in the Hat)
- Country: United States
- Language: English

Daffy Season is a 2026 American animated Looney Tunes short comedy film featuring the characters Daffy Duck and Elmer Fudd. Directed by Todd Wilderman and Hamish Grieve, the short premiered at the 2026 Annecy International Animation Film Festival on June 22, and was released in theaters worldwide on November 6, being shown before The Cat in the Hat.

This short is the final released project in the franchise to feature involvement from Eric Bauza, who died from hypertensive cardiovascular disease twelve days prior to the short's theatrical release. Daffy Season was dedicated in Bauza's memory.

== Plot ==
After the start of duck season, Daffy Duck notes that no one is hunting him. He eventually goes into Elmer Fudd's house, where he discovers that Elmer is focused on a soccer game. After learning that it is currently "Soccer season", he tries to call Elmer's attention and calls Bugs Bunny for help, before Bugs arrives there, who is also interested in the game.

Daffy then tries to turn off the television, but ends up changing the audio to Spanish right when Speedy Gonzales appears, much to his dismay. After a few more attempts to turn off the television (such as trying to unplug it being wet from a prior fire extinguish before being electrocuted and trying to turn off the nearby power station's energy only to realize Elmer's house has a power generator), Lola Bunny, Yosemite Sam and Porky Pig then join Elmer and Bugs to see the game.

After Porky announces that he has tickets for the next soccer match, Daffy imagines them as soccer-obsessed zombies, before he is taken to the game. Seemingly interested at first, he suddenly steals the ball on the field and pops it, much to the frustration of Elmer and the rest of the crowd, and the pleasure of Daffy. He is then chased out of the stadium by Elmer, Lola, Porky, Sam, Speedy and the angry crowd, as he happily yells "That's all, folks!", ending the short.

== Voice cast ==
- Eric Bauza as Daffy Duck
- Jeff Bergman as Bugs Bunny, Elmer Fudd, Porky Pig, and Yosemite Sam
- Gabriel Iglesias as Speedy Gonzales
- Jeannie Tirado as Lola Bunny

== Production ==
In August 2024, it was reported that Warner Bros. Entertainment was planning to relaunch the Looney Tunes theatrical film series in 2028. Later in October, it was reported that Warner Bros. Pictures Animation was working on a "super secret Looney Tunes project", with DreamWorks Animation veterans Todd Wilderman and Hamish Grieve attached to direct. In April 2026, it was revealed that the project that Wilderman and Grieve were working on was a new animated short film featuring Daffy Duck and Elmer Fudd titled Daffy Season. The animation was provided by DNEG Animation. The voices were provided by Eric Bauza and Jeff Bergman. The stylized production design for the short, done by Rachel Daniels-Gallo, was inspired by the works of former Looney Tunes artist Maurice Noble.

== Release ==
The short premiered at the 2026 Annecy International Animation Film Festival on June 22, coinciding with the 2026 FIFA World Cup. It was theatrically released to accompany screenings of The Cat in the Hat on November 6.
