= Alessandro Carloni =

Italian screenwriter

- Born: 1978 (age 47–48); Bologna, Italy
- Education: University of Milan
- Occupations: Film director, writer, animator, storyteller
- Years active: 1997–present
- Employers: DreamWorks Animation (2002–2017); Skydance Animation (2017–2020); Locksmith Animation (2017); Warner Bros. Pictures Animation (2023–present)
- Known for: the Kung Fu Panda series the How to Train Your Dragon film series
- Spouse: Nicolette Davenport (m. 2016)

Alessandro Carloni is an Italian film director, writer, animator, and art director, best known for his work with DreamWorks Animation in general, particularly the first three Kung Fu Panda films. He co-directed Kung Fu Panda 3, alongside Jennifer Yuh Nelson.

== Biography ==
Born in Bologna, Carloni spent his childhood in Urbino, a walled city and World Heritage site southwest of Pesaro, known for its remarkable legacy of independent Renaissance culture and for being the birthplace of Renaissance master Raphael Santi. But Carloni was not a young artist, at least not officially. Not even though his father worked as an illustrator for magazines, book covers and advertisements. "I was exposed to his work, but he never pushed me to be part of his studio," Carloni says. "He taught me many things. He wanted me to explore on my own." He became an artist almost despite himself. Carloni entered the University of Milan as a literature major, but to earn money, he began selling drawings. "I got little jobs through my friends to help pay for meals and money here and there," he says. "Small things like invitation tickets for clubs." Those little jobs helped change his future. "It made me understand that my true passion was visual storytelling," he says. "I cared about that more than continuing my studies." A friend in Germany suggested he apply to Munich Animation, and soon Carloni was an in-betweener. "I drew all the tedious drawings," he says. But, that led to work as an animator, a story artist, a director, an art director, a character designer, a sculptor, and an animation supervisor for commercials, music videos, and feature films in Germany, Switzerland, and Denmark. Then, in 2000, he co-directed an award-winning animated short film through Munich Animation with writer-director Gabriele Pennacchioli. The studio envisioned the film, The Shark and the Piano, as a marketing tool. "It was still a time when American studios sent portions of their 2D feature films to Europe to produce," Carloni says, "so we decided to make a film to show what we could do." But, by the time they approached the American studios, those studios had turned their focus to 3D.

Since joining DreamWorks Animation in 2002, Carloni served as lead animator on Sinbad: Legend of the Seven Seas and Shark Tale, an animation supervisor on Kung Fu Panda, a story artist on Kung Fu Panda 2 and The Croods, and head of story on the first two How to Train Your Dragon movies and as a story artist on The Hidden World. For his work on Kung Fu Panda, he was nominated in the category Storyboarding in an Animated Feature Production at the 36th Annie Awards. In early 2012, Carloni was attached as a director to the animated film Me and My Shadow for DWA, replacing the original director Mark Dindal. By early 2013, the film had returned into development following massive lay-offs at DWA. By early 2015, Carloni had joined Jennifer Yuh Nelson to help her co-directing Kung Fu Panda 3 (2016), in order to meet its release dateline.

In 2017, Carloni was hired to originally direct Skydance Animation's first animated feature film Luck, but he left the project in January 2020 over creative differences and was replaced by Peggy Holmes. Also in 2017, Carloni was also hired to originally direct 20th Century Studios and Locksmith Animation's first animated feature film Ron's Gone Wrong with Jean-Philippe Vine (in his feature film directorial debut), but Carloni left the project and was replaced by Sarah Smith. In June 2023, Carloni was announced to be writing and directing Warner Bros. Pictures Animation's feature film adaptation of Dr. Seuss's 1957 children's book The Cat in the Hat with Erica Rivinoja (in her feature film directorial debut).

== Filmography ==
| Year | Title | Roles and occupations |
|---|---|---|
| 1997 | The Fearless Four | Assistant animator |
| 1999 | Tobias and His Lion | Rough animator |
| 2000 | Help! I'm a Fish | Lead animator Sculptor |
| 2001 | The Shark and the Piano | Co-director with Gabriele Pennacchioli; Story developer Animation director Supervising effects animator Sculptor |
| 2003 | Sinbad: Legend of the Seven Seas | Lead animator for "Sinbad" |
| 2004 | Shark Tale | Lead animator for "Crazy Joe"; Story developer |
| 2006 | First Flight | Storyboard artist |
| 2006 | Over the Hedge | Animator; Storyboard artist |
| 2008 | Kung Fu Panda | Animation supervisor Story artist Traditional animator for "Mr. Ping" (uncredited) |
| 2010 | How to Train Your Dragon | Head of story |
| 2010 | Kung Fu Panda Holiday | Head of character animation |
| 2011 | Kung Fu Panda 2 | Story artist |
| 2013 | The Croods | Story artist |
| 2014 | How to Train Your Dragon 2 | Head of story |
| 2016 | Kung Fu Panda 3 | Co-director with Jennifer Yuh Nelson |
| 2016 | Cake Wars | Himself as a guest judge |
| 2016 | Made in Hollywood | Himself in a guest appearance in one episode |
| 2016 | Made in Hollywood: Teen Edition | Himself in a guest appearance in one episode |
| 2016 | Sidewalks Entertainment | Himself in a guest appearance in one episode |
| 2019 | How to Train Your Dragon: The Hidden World | Storyboard artist Story artist |
| 2021 | Luca | Additional voice artist |
| 2021 | Ron's Gone Wrong | Creative consultant |
| 2026 | The Cat in the Hat | Co-director and co-writer with Erica Rivinoja (in her feature film directorial debut) |
| TBA | The Fourteenth Goldfish | Executive producer |

== Nominations ==
- Best Storyboarding in an Animated Feature Production for How to Train Your Dragon (2010, Annie's)
- Best Storyboarding in an Animated Feature Production for Kung Fu Panda (2008, Annie's)
