= The Cat in the Hat (2026 film) =

2026 animated film

- Theatrical release poster
- Directed by: Erica Rivinoja; Alessandro Carloni
- Screenplay by: Erica Rivinoja; Alessandro Carloni
- Story by: Caroline Williams
- Based on: The Cat in the Hat by Dr. Seuss
- Produced by: Daniela Mazzucato; Jared Stern
- Starring: Bill Hader; Matt Berry; Quinta Brunson; Xochitl Gomez; Tiago Martinez; Giancarlo Esposito; America Ferrera; Paula Pell; Bowen Yang; Tituss Burgess
- Edited by: Dan Molina
- Music by: Lorne Balfe
- Production company: Warner Bros. Pictures Animation
- Distributed by: Warner Bros. Pictures
- Release dates: October 25, 2026 (Warner Bros. Studios Burbank); November 6, 2026 (United States)
- Running time: 107 minutes
- Country: United States
- Language: English
- Budget: $86–92 million
- Box office: $70.2 million

The Cat in the Hat is a 2026 American animated fantasy comedy film loosely based on the 1957 children's book by Dr. Seuss. Written and directed by Alessandro Carloni and Erica Rivinoja, it is the second feature-length adaptation of the book following the 2003 live-action film. Bill Hader stars as the voice of the titular character, alongside Matt Berry, Quinta Brunson, Xochitl Gomez, Tiago Martinez, Giancarlo Esposito, America Ferrera, Paula Pell, Bowen Yang, and Tituss Burgess.

An animated adaptation of The Cat in the Hat was originally announced by Illumination Entertainment in 2012, following the commercial success of The Lorax, with Rob Lieber set to write the script, but the film never came to fruition. Warner Bros. Pictures picked up the rights to the book in January 2018. Rivinoja and Art Hernandez were hired to direct in October 2020 before the latter was replaced by Carloni in June 2023. Most of the cast was announced in March 2024, with DNEG Animation providing animation. Additional casting took place in June 2025.

The Cat in the Hat premiered at Warner Bros. Studios Burbank on October 25, 2026, and was theatrically released in the United States on November 6, by Warner Bros. Pictures. It received mixed reviews from critics and has grossed $62 million worldwide.

== Plot ==
The Cat in the Hat is an employee of the Institute for the Institution of Imagination and Inspiration, LLC, (The I.I.I.I.) an otherworldly place populated by strange creatures who visit the human world to entertain children. After the Cat causes chaos at his recent visit, the institution's CEO Mr. Hoogeboom wants to fire him. However, Sherrie from HR allows the Cat one last chance. Begrudgingly, Hoogeboom gives the Cat a flurple folder, which houses challenging cases. Wanting him gone, Hoogeboom tricks the Cat to go to the supply closet. There, the Cat finds an object called the Go-Backer, a stopwatch that can reverse time.

Siblings Gabby and Sebastian have recently moved to the town of Highland after their mother Carmen took a job at the local hospital. Gabby misses their old home, while the strict apartment landlady Patty bans pets which forces the family to hide their goldfish Waffles. When Carmen leaves to go to the hospital, the Cat, using a small door that gives him access to the human realm, shows up to entertain the kids. However, when he introduces the Go-Backer to them, Gabby attempts to use it to reverse their move. A scuffle causes them to drop the watch in one of three boxes that hold the individual possessions of each family member, which have been made into pocket dimensions by the Cat's magic.

After the Cat promises to let Gabby use the Go-Backer to undo her family's move, he, the kids, and Waffles hitch a ride on the converted family couch to venture into Sebastian's box, where they meet his toy collection. They visit the Psychic Narwhal to learn where the Go-Backer is, but the Narwhal refuses to help them due a lack of motivation. After putting on a circus show, a rejuvenated Narwhal tells them that the Go-Backer is in the box belonging to the person with the most creativity. Believing it is in Gabby's box since she is a creative person, they try to leave, but are chased by a dragon-like creature called the Something. They escape, but Gabby has Sebastian and Waffles stay behind so they will not be in danger and the Cat, misunderstanding a comment from Waffles, gives them a box containing a group of red-vested, blue-haired creatures called the Things.

Back at the institute, Sherrie learns that the Cat has the Go-Backer, but Hoogeboom drops by, gloating to Sherrie that he tricked him into getting it so that he could finally fire him. Meanwhile, the Cat and Gabby venture through Gabby's box, but do not find the Go-Backer and the Something soon spots them. The Cat and the Things hide as Patty manages to make her way into the apartment, seeing the mess and Waffles, causing her to contact Carmen, who the Cat recognizes as a previous client and claims she was a creative child.

The Cat deduces that the Go-Backer is in Carmen's box, so he, the kids and Waffles venture inside her box and see that their mother was fun-loving in her youth. When Gabby mistakenly believes the Cat's visit to her at a retirement home led to people getting hurt, she accuses the Cat of only wanting to entertain himself. Just then, the Something appears and attacks them, separating the Cat from the kids where he soon finds out that he and Sherrie have been fired by Hoogeboom.

Back in the apartment, Gabby realizes that Carmen's art was meant to help people, something that the Cat helped her discover. A photo of her mother at the retirement home reveals it actually was from a concert that brought people joy. The kids head back into Carmen's box to save the Cat with the help of their belongings. Gabby breaks the Go-Backer, which causes the Something to revert to its original form: the missing Thing 2.

As the Cat begins cleaning up, Sherrie arrives and tells him that she is the President of the institute. With Hoogeboom having been demoted to intern by the board of directors, Sherrie allows the Cat to keep his job, as she has become the new CEO. He returns to his world as Carmen thanks him.

== Voice cast ==
- Bill Hader as the Cat in the Hat, a tall anthropomorphic cat who wears a magical red-and-white striped top-hat and works for the Institute for the Institution of Imagination and Inspiration, LLC
- Matt Berry as Waffles, Gabby and Sebastian's pet goldfish who was given the ability to talk and move from his fishbowl by the Cat
- Quinta Brunson as Sherrie from HR, the HR director at the IIII, LLC who is secretly the company president
- Xochitl Gomez as Gabby, Sebastian's older sister and one of the Cat's newest clients
- Tiago Martinez as Sebastian, Gabby's younger brother and one of the Cat's newest clients
- Giancarlo Esposito as Mr. Hoogeboom, the CEO of the IIII, LLC who is exasperated by him
- America Ferrera as Carmen, Gabby and Sebastian's mother who works at a hospital
- Paula Pell as Patty, Gabby and Sebastian's apartment landlady who hates pets
- Bowen Yang as Gary, an intern at the IIII, LLC
- Tituss Burgess as the Psychic Narwhal, a narwhal that helps the Cat in the Hat
- Mayabella Sage Mccrillis as Sally
- Johnny Haemmerle as Dick
- Ryan Gaffney as Pig in a Wig, a worker at IIII, LLC
- Asha Marie as Rosa, Gabby's new neighbor

== Production ==
In 2012, following the financial success of The Lorax, an animated film adaptation of Dr. Seuss' eponymous book, Universal Pictures and Illumination Entertainment announced plans to produce a CGI adaptation of The Cat in the Hat. Rob Lieber was set to write the script, with Chris Meledandri as producer, and Audrey Geisel as the executive producer, but the project never came to fruition.

In January 2018, Warner Bros. Pictures picked up the rights to an animated Cat in the Hat film for Warner Animation Group, later renamed Warner Bros. Pictures Animation, as part of a creative partnership with Dr. Seuss Enterprises. In October 2020, Erica Rivinoja and Art Hernandez were announced as directors. In June 2023, Hernandez was replaced by Alessandro Carloni.

In March 2024, it was reported that Bill Hader had been cast in the titular role; Hader previously played the character in a parody sketch on Saturday Night Live. Later that month, WBPA president Bill Damaschke formally confirmed Hader's role, with Quinta Brunson, Bowen Yang, Xochitl Gomez, Matt Berry, and Paula Pell announced to be part of the voice cast; Hader would also serve as executive producer alongside Dr. Seuss Enterprises president and CEO Susan Brandt. Jared Stern and Daniela Mazzucato were announced to serve as producers, while Carloni and Rivinoja would both write and direct the film, with DNEG Animation handling animation. In June 2025, it was reported that America Ferrera had joined the voice cast. Ferrera was confirmed alongside Tiago Martinez, Tituss Burgess, and Giancarlo Esposito later that month.

== Music ==
On June 12, 2026, Lorne Balfe announced that he would be composing the score for the film. Hilary Duff recorded a song for the film, titled "CATastrophe". It was released on October 2, 2026, via WaterTower Music.

"The Cat in the Hat Theme Song", performed by Fitz and Tim Minchin featuring Hader, was released as the lead single from the soundtrack on September 9, 2026 via WaterTower Music. The full soundtrack was released on October 30.

== Marketing ==
A first look at the film was shown during Warner Bros' CinemaCon panel at the beginning of April 2025, along with presenters Bill Hader and Bill Damaschke. It featured details such as the Cat's field of work and his previous failed assignments, his co-workers who are similar in fashion (anthropomorphic animals wearing items that rhyme with their names), and the introduction of additional Thing characters besides Thing One and Thing Two. An announcement video for the film featuring Hader was uploaded on June 30 of the same year to various media platforms, revealing that the first trailer for the film would be released on July 1, with the debut of a new on-screen logo for Warner Bros. Pictures Animation, following its rebranding in 2023. The film's second (labeled third for marketing purposes) official trailer was released on June 9, 2026, with the debut of another new on-screen logo for Warner Bros. Pictures Animation. The film's main official trailer was released on September 10, 2026.

=== Merchandise ===
On March 16, 2026, Dr. Seuss Enterprises appointed Just Play to be the global master toy licensee for its properties, including the film.

== Release ==
The Cat in the Hat premiered at the Warner Bros. Studios Burbank on October 25, 2026, and was released theatrically in the United States on November 6.

The film was originally expected to be released sometime in 2024 or 2025, and scheduled for March 6, 2026, before it was moved up a week to February 27 of the same year in March 2025. This shift was reportedly made to avoid competition with Disney and Pixar's Hoppers, which would have been released on the same date. The Cat in the Hat's final release date was announced in August 2025. The film was accompanied by a Looney Tunes short film, titled Daffy Season.

== Reception ==
=== Box office ===
As of November 20, 2026, The Cat in the Hat has grossed $42 million in the United States and Canada, and $20 million in other territories, for a worldwide total of $62 million.

In the United States and Canada, The Cat in the Hat made $1 million from Thursday night previews, and went on to debut at $20 million, finishing in second place at the box office. In its second weekend, the film grossed $11.4 million (a drop of 43% from its first weekend), remaining in second place. In its third weekend, the film grossed $6.9 million (a drop of 39% from its second weekend), finishing in fourth place.

=== Critical response ===
On the review aggregator website Rotten Tomatoes, 47% of 68 critics' reviews are positive, with an average rating of 5.6/10. The website's consensus reads: "A high-energy sprint through the world imagined by Dr. Seuss, The Cat in the Hat's eagerness to please has some charm but could have benefitted from smaller stakes and a less frantic pace." Metacritic, which uses a weighted average, assigned the film a score of 46 out of 100, based on 16 critics, indicating "mixed or average" reviews. Audiences polled by CinemaScore gave the film an average grade of "A" on an A+ to F scale, while 81% of those polled by PostTrak gave the film a positive score, with 61% saying they would definitely recommend it.

== Future ==
=== Potential sequel ===
In November 2026, TheWrap reported that a sequel was under consideration, and that it would be determined by the film's reception.

=== Shared universe ===
In October 2020, it was reported that The Cat in the Hat was intended to launch a shared universe based on Dr. Seuss books, dubbed "The Seussiverse".

An adaptation of another Dr. Seuss book, Oh, the Places You'll Go!, is scheduled to be released on March 17, 2028. A spin-off film based on the characters Thing One and Thing Two was also reported to be in development at the time of the announcement.

== See also ==
- List of films based on Dr. Seuss books
