= Oh, the Places You'll Go! =

1990 children's picture book by Dr. Seuss

- Cover image
- Author: Dr. Seuss
- Illustrator: Dr. Seuss
- Language: English
- Genre: Children's literature
- Publisher: Random House
- Publication date: January 22, 1990
- Publication place: United States
- Media type: Print (Hardcover and paperback)
- ISBN: 0-679-80527-3
- OCLC: 20169007
- Dewey Decimal: [E] 20
- LC Class: PZ8.3.G276 Og 1990
- Preceded by: You're Only Old Once!

Oh, the Places You'll Go! is a children's picture book, written and illustrated by children's author Dr. Seuss. It was first published by Random House on January 22, 1990. It was his last book to be published during his lifetime, before his death on September 24, 1991, at the age of 87.

Though written in the style of Seuss' previous books such as How the Grinch Stole Christmas! and The Cat in the Hat, Oh, the Places You'll Go! is told in the second person. The story concerns the journey of life, its challenges, and joys.

== Plot ==
The story begins with the narrator, relating the decision of the unnamed protagonist (who represents the reader) to leave town. The protagonist travels through several geometrical and polychromatic landscapes and places, eventually encountering a place simply called "The Waiting Place", which is ominously addressed as being a place where everyone is always waiting for something to happen. As the protagonist continues to explore, spurred on by the thoughts of places he will visit and things he will discover, the book cheerfully concludes with an open ending.

== Reception ==
Following its original release in 1990, Oh, the Places You'll Go! reached number one on The New York Times Best-Selling Fiction Hardcover list. This made Dr. Seuss one of the handful of authors to have number one Hardcover Fiction and Nonfiction books on the list; among them are John Steinbeck, Jimmy Buffett, Mitch Albom and James Patterson; his You're Only Old Once! hit number one on the Nonfiction list in 1986.

In the United States and Canada, Oh, the Places You'll Go! is a popular gift for students graduating from kindergarten through college, with sales spiking in the April–June period. It reached number one on USA Today's Best Selling Book list in 1997, 2021 and 2022, and reached #2 in 2015 and 2017. Based on a 2007 online poll, the National Education Association listed the book as one of its "Teachers' Top 100 Books for Children".

== Film adaptation ==
=== Early attempts ===
In the early 1990s, producers Ben Myron and Roland Joffé at Lightmotive and TriStar Pictures were to produce a film adaptation of the book with Seuss penning the screenplay. The Seuss screenplay was later rewritten by Richard LaGravenese and Barry Berman, but the adaptation never came to fruition.

=== Development ===
A musical fantasy animated film adaptation of the book along with The Cat in the Hat (2026) and a spin-off Thing One and Thing Two were announced to be in development as part of a shared universe from Warner Bros. Pictures Animation, with J. J. Abrams producing the film along with his production company Bad Robot Productions. In November 2021, Jon M. Chu was attached to direct the film. In June 2024, Jill Culton was attached to co-direct the film alongside Chu. It was also announced that Benj Pasek and Justin Paul would be writing the original songs, while Rob Lieber would write the script. In January 2025, the film would be revealed to be scheduled for release on March 17, 2028. On July 15, 2025, Ariana Grande and Josh Gad were the first to join the cast.

== Oh, the Places You'll Boldly Go! lawsuit ==
In 2016, former Star Trek writer David Gerrold partnered with artist Ty Templeton and Glenn Hauman's website ComicMix for a Kickstarter for a parodic book entitled Oh, the Places You'll Boldly Go! The proposed book would parody the original Seuss book in a Star Trek context. The title references the phrase "to boldly go where no one has gone before", made famous by Star Trek.

Dr. Seuss Enterprises, which manages the assets of Dr. Seuss's estate, sued to stop the Kickstarter. The lawsuit stated that Hauman's book, which, also makes use of other of Seuss' books, including Oh, The Places You'll Go!, Horton Hears a Who!, How the Grinch Stole Christmas!, The Lorax, and The Sneetches and Other Stories, copied Dr. Seuss' copyrighted work, recreating entire pages from his books "with meticulous precision". The lawsuit also stated that the book's violation of Dr. Seuss' trademark would create confusion in the minds of the public as to Dr. Seuss's approval or licensing.

In May 2018, U.S District Court Judge Janis Sammartino found in favor of ComicMix on the issue of Dr. Seuss' trademark, ruling that its book was "a highly transformative work that takes no more than necessary to accomplish its transformative purpose and will not impinge on the original market for Plaintiff's underlying work".

In March 2019, Sammartino similarly found in favor of ComicMix on the issue of copyright, ruling that the book was protected under Fair Use, because its authors borrowed "no more than was necessary for their purposes" and those elements "were always adapted or transformed" and "imbued with a different character".

The Ninth Circuit Court of Appeals reversed that decision in December 2020 on the basis that the work was not parody as it copied too much of the book's original style and composition, only substituting Star Trek characters in place of Seuss' original ones. Further, the Ninth Circuit argued that the timing of release might impact the commercial value of Seuss' book, since the latter is often given out as gifts for graduates.
