= Bad Fairies =

Upcoming animated film by Megan Nicole Dong

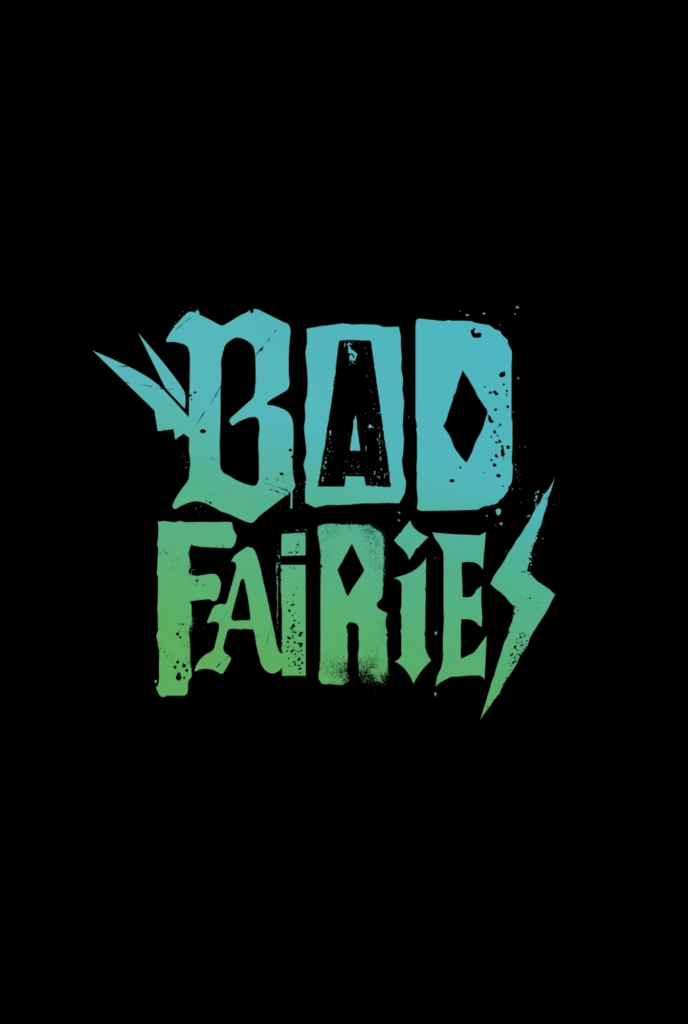
- Official logo
- Directed by: Megan Nicole Dong
- Written by: Deborah Frances-White; Zoë Tomalin
- Produced by: Carolyn Soper
- Starring: Cynthia Erivo; Ncuti Gatwa; Jonathan Groff; James Acaster; Serrana Su-Ling Bliss; Catherine Tate; Kylie Minogue
- Cinematography: James C.J. Williams
- Edited by: Sim Evan-Jones
- Music by: Isabella Summers (score); Toby Marlow (songs); Lucy Moss (songs)
- Production companies: Warner Bros. Pictures Animation; Locksmith Animation; Sketchshark Productions
- Distributed by: Warner Bros. Pictures
- Release date: 21 May 2027
- Countries: United Kingdom; United States
- Language: English

Bad Fairies is an upcoming animated musical fantasy comedy film directed by Megan Nicole Dong and written by Deborah Frances-White and Zoë Tomalin, featuring original songs written by Toby Marlow and Lucy Moss. Set in contemporary London, it follows a gang of bad fairies who break every single rule in the almanac. The film will star Cynthia Erivo, Ncuti Gatwa, Jonathan Groff, James Acaster, Serrana Su-Ling Bliss, Catherine Tate, and Kylie Minogue.

Locksmith Animation began developing an original musical comedy film in June 2021 alongside That Christmas (2024) when CEO Sarah Smith was replaced by Natalie Fischer. Dong joined as a director with Frances-White writing the screenplay in June 2023, along with the official title announcement. Marlow and Moss later came on board to write original songs for the film, with Isabella Summers composing the score, and DNEG Animation handling animation.

Bad Fairies is scheduled to be released in theatres on May 21, 2027.

== Premise ==
In contemporary London, England, a bad gang of fairies have broken every single guideline in an almanac. However, when they accidentally transform a normal, female tween named Fei Chang into a fairy, they discover that the magical system is on the verge of inescapable demolition.

== Voice cast ==
- Cynthia Erivo as Jayne Staplegun, a trailblazing, bad fairy whose defiant streak sparks an uprising
- Ncuti Gatwa as Butterwort
- Jonathan Groff as Robin Goodfellow
- James Acaster as Stickers
- Serrana Su-Ling Bliss as Fei Chang, a normal, female tween who is accidentally transformed into a fairy
- Kylie Minogue as Clowder, a cat witch
- Catherine Tate as the Fairy Gothmother
- Dee Bradley Baker as Groundbeef

== Production ==
=== Development ===
In June 2021, shortly after CEO Sarah Smith was replaced by Natalie Fischer, the former COO of Illumination, it was announced that Locksmith Animation was developing an original musical comedy film alongside That Christmas (2024). On 9 June 2023, as part of the rebranding of Warner Animation Group now called Warner Bros. Pictures Animation, it was announced that the studio had signed a first-look deal with Locksmith to develop and produce animated features for worldwide distribution. The original musical comedy film's title was revealed as Bad Fairies, with Megan Nicole Dong attached to direct and Deborah Frances-White writing the screenplay. DNEG Animation will handle the film's animation, after having previously worked with Locksmith on Ron's Gone Wrong (2021) and That Christmas.

In October 2025, Cynthia Erivo joined the cast, while Olivier Staphylas was announced to be co-directing the film. The following month, Ncuti Gatwa joined the cast. In June 2026, James Acaster, veteran voice actor Dee Bradley Baker, and Serrana Su-Ling Bliss joined the cast. Kylie Minogue, Jonathan Groff and Catherine Tate would be added to the voice cast in October.

=== Music ===
Toby Marlow and Lucy Moss will write original songs for the film, with Isabella Summers composing the score and producing the songs.

== Release ==
Bad Fairies is scheduled to be released in the United States on 21 May 2027. It was originally scheduled to release on 23 July 2027.
