= Erica Rivinoja =

American screenwriter

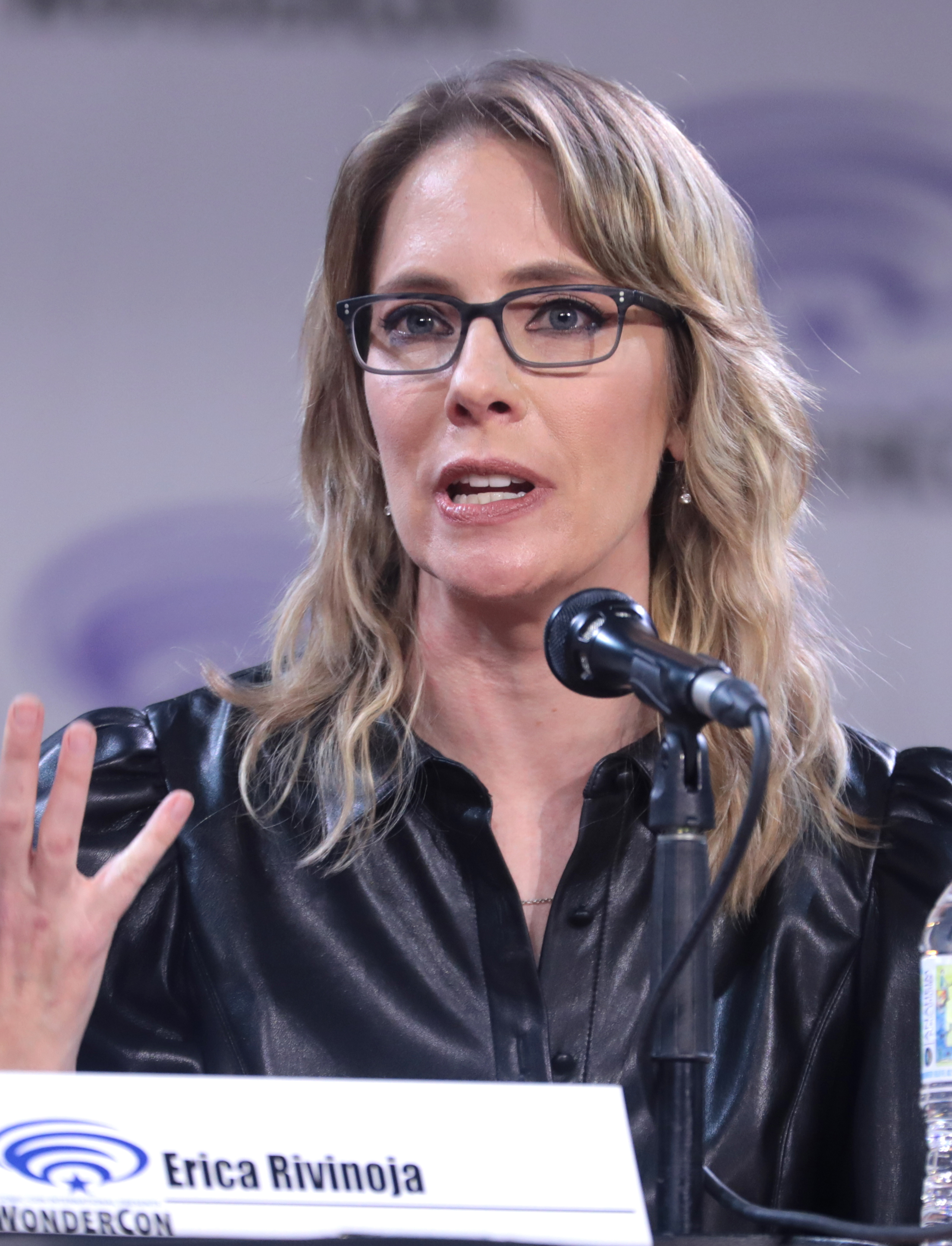
- Notable work: Borat Subsequent Moviefilm; The Cat in the Hat; South Park
- Awards: two Primetime Emmy Awards for Outstanding Animated Program

Erica Rivinoja is an American writer, producer, and director.

She was nominated for the Academy Award for Best Adapted Screenplay for co-writing Borat Subsequent Moviefilm (2020).

Her other film screenplays include Extreme Movie (2008) and Cloudy with a Chance of Meatballs 2 (2013), and story credits on Trolls (2016), Girls Trip (2017), and The Addams Family (2019). Rivinoja made her directorial debut with an animated adaptation of The Cat in the Hat (2026).

== Biography ==
From 2001 to 2012, Rivinoja served as a writer, producer, and consultant on the animated comedy series South Park, which earned her two Primetime Emmy Awards for Outstanding Animated Program from four nominations.

Rivinoja is a native of Hobbs, New Mexico. She graduated from Hobbs High School in 1995.
