= List of fantasy films of the 2020s =

This is a list of fantasy films released in the 2020s. Films listed include live action and animated.

== List ==
Title	Director	Cast	Country	Production companies and distribution companies	Ref.	Release date
2020
Artemis Fowl	Kenneth Branagh	Ferdia Shaw, Lara McDonnell, Josh Gad, Tamara Smart, Nonso Anozie, Colin Farrell, Judi Dench	United States	Walt Disney Pictures		June 12, 2020
Baba Yaga: Terror of the Dark Forest	Svyatoslav Podgaevsky	Oleg Chugunov, Glafira Golubeva, Artyom Zhigulin, Svetlana Ustinova, Maryana Spivak, Aleksey Rozin	Russia	Central Partnership, QS Films, Non-Stop Production		February 27, 2020
Bad President	Param Gill	Jeff Rector, Eddie Griffin	United States	Independent		October 12, 2020
Come Away	Brenda Chapman	David Oyelowo, Anna Chancellor, Angelina Jolie, Michael Caine, Clarke Peters, Gugu Mbatha-Raw, David Gyasi, Derek Jacobi	United States, United Kingdom	Relativity Media, Endurance Media, Fred Films, Yoruba Saxon Productions		November 13, 2020
Demon Slayer: Kimetsu no Yaiba the Movie: Mugen Train	Haruo Sotozaki	Natsuki Hanae, Akari Kitō, Yoshitsugu Matsuoka, Hiro Shimono, Satoshi Hino	Japan	Toho, Aniplex		October 16, 2020
Dolittle	Stephen Gaghan	Robert Downey Jr., Antonio Banderas, Michael Sheen, Emma Thompson, Rami Malek, John Cena, Kumail Nanjiani, Octavia Spencer, Tom Holland, Craig Robinson, Ralph Fiennes, Selena Gomez, Marion Cotillard	United States	Universal Pictures, Roth/Kirschenbaum Films, Team Downey, Perfect World Pictures		January 17, 2020
Doraemon: Nobita's New Dinosaur	Kazuaki Imai	Wasabi Mizuta, Megumi Ōhara, Yumi Kakazu, Subaru Kimura, Tomokazu Seki	Japan	Toho		August 7, 2020
Dragon Rider	Tomer Eshed	Thomas Brodie-Sangster, Felicity Jones, Freddie Highmore, Patrick Stewart	Germany	Constantin Film, Rise Pictures, Cyborn 3D		October 16, 2020
Dragonheart: Vengeance	Ivan Silvestrini	Joseph Millson, Jack Kane, Helena Bonham Carter	United States, Romania	Universal Pictures Home Entertainment, Raffaella Productions		February 4, 2020
Fantasy Island	Jeff Wadlow	Michael Peña, Maggie Q, Lucy Hale, Austin Stowell, Jimmy O. Yang, Ryan Hansen, Portia Doubleday, Michael Rooker	United States	Columbia Pictures, Blumhouse Productions		February 14, 2020
Fate/stay night: Heaven's Feel III. spring song	Tomonori Sudō	Noriaki Sugiyama, Noriko Shitaya, Yuu Asakawa, Mai Kadowaki, Kana Ueda, Ayako Kawasumi	Japan	Ufotable, Aniplex		August 15, 2020
Godmothered	Sharon Maguire	Isla Fisher, Jillian Bell	United States	Disney+		December 4, 2020
Gretel & Hansel	Oz Perkins	Sophia Lillis, Sam Leakey, Charles Babalola, Jessica De Gouw, Alice Krige	United States	Orion Pictures, Bron Creative		January 31, 2020
I Am Fear	Kevin Shulman	Kristina Klebe, Eoin Macken, Faran Tahir, Christian Oliver, Bill Moseley, William Forsythe	United States	Roxwell Films, Shout! Factory		February 21, 2020
Love and Monsters	Michael Matthews	Dylan O'Brien, Jessica Henwick, Dan Ewing, Ariana Greenblatt, Michael Rooker	United States	Paramount Pictures, 21 Laps Entertainment, Entertainment One		October 16, 2020
May the Devil Take You Too	Timo Tjahjanto	Chelsea Islan, Widika Sidmore, Hadijah Shahab, Baskara Mahendra, Shareefa Daanish	Indonesia	Shudder		February 27, 2020
A Mermaid in Paris	Mathias Malzieu	Nicolas Duvauchelle, Marilyn Lima, Romane Bohringer, Rossy de Palma, Tchéky Karyo, Alexis Michalik, Rodolphe Pauly	France	Sony Pictures Releasing		March 11, 2020
Mookuthi Amman	RJ Balaji	Nayanthara, RJ Balaji, Urvashi	India	Disney+ Hotstar		November 14, 2020
Mortal	André Øvredal	Nat Wolf, Iben Akerlie, Per Frisch, Per Egil Aske, Priyanka Bose	Norway	Saban Films		February 28, 2020
Mortal Kombat Legends: Scorpion's Revenge	Ethan Spaulding	Patrick Seitz, Steve Blum, Jordan Rodrigues, Darin De Paul, Joel McHale, Jennifer Carpenter	United States	Warner Bros. Home Entertainment		April 14, 2020
Mulan	Niki Caro	Yifei Liu, Donnie Yen, Tzi Ma, Jason Scott Lee, Yoson An, Ron Yuan, Gong Li, Jet Li	United States	Walt Disney Pictures		September 4, 2020
Onward	Dan Scanlon	Tom Holland, Chris Pratt, Julia Louis-Dreyfus, Octavia Spencer	United States	Walt Disney Pictures, Pixar		March 6, 2020
Sonic the Hedgehog	Jeff Fowler	James Marsden, Ben Schwartz, Tika Sumpter, Jim Carrey	United States, Japan	Paramount Pictures, Sega Sammy Group, Original Film, Marza Animation Planet, Blur Studio		February 14, 2020
Soul	Pete Docter	Jamie Foxx, Tina Fey, Graham Norton, Rachel House, Alice Braga, Richard Ayoade, Phylicia Rashad, Donnell Rawlings, Questlove, Angela Bassett	United States	Walt Disney Pictures, Pixar		December 25, 2020
Take a Spin in the Air	Cristián Sánchez Garfias	Rodrigo González Larrondo, Cristóbal Bascuñán, Diego Madrigal, Zacarías del Río, Ana María Zabala, Camila Leppe, José Ignacio Diez, Daniel Pérez	Chile	Nómada Producciones		October 15, 2020
The Craft: Legacy	Zoe Lister-Jones	Cailee Spaeny, Gideon Adlon, Lovie Simone, Zoey Luna, Nicholas Galitzine, Michelle Monaghan, David Duchovny	United States	Columbia Pictures, Blumhouse Productions		October 28, 2020
The Promise of Return	Cristián Sánchez Garfias	Natalia Martínez, Manuel Hübner, José Ignacio Diez, Anderson Tudor, Beatriz Carillo, Rafael Jean François, Daniel Pérez	Chile	Nómada Producciones		October 15, 2020
The Secret Garden	Marc Munden	Colin Firth, Julie Walters, Dixie Egerickx, Edan Hayhurst, Amir Wilson	France	Sky, StudioCanal, Heyday Films		August 7, 2020
The Turning	Floria Sigismondi	Mackenzie Davis, Finn Wolfhard, Brooklynn Prince, Joely Richardson	United States	Universal Pictures, DreamWorks Pictures, Amblin Entertainment, Vertigo Entertainment		January 24, 2020
The Witches	Robert Zemeckis	Anne Hathaway, Octavia Spencer, Stanley Tucci, Kristin Chenoweth	United States	Warner Bros. Pictures, HBO Max		October 22, 2020
The Yin-Yang Master: Dream of Eternity	Guo Jingming	Deng Lun, Mark Chao, Olivia Wang, Wang Duo	China	Hehe Pictures, ZUI, Thinkingdom Pictures, Shanghai Film Group, Black Ant Film		December 25, 2020
Trolls World Tour	Walt Dohrn	Anna Kendrick, Justin Timberlake, Rachel Bloom, James Corden, Ron Funches, Kelly Clarkson, Anderson .Paak, Sam Rockwell, George Clinton, Mary J. Blige, Carlos Saldanha	United States	Universal Pictures, DreamWorks Animation		April 10, 2020
Wolfwalkers	Tomm Moore, Ross Stewart	Honor Kneafsey, Eva Whittaker, Sean Bean, Simon McBurney, Tommy Tiernan, Jon Kenny, John Morton, Maria Doyle Kennedy	Ireland, United Kingdom, France	Cartoon Saloon, Melusine Productions		December 2, 2020
Wonder Woman 1984	Patty Jenkins	Gal Gadot, Chris Pine, Kristen Wiig, Pedro Pascal, Robin Wright, Connie Nielsen	United States	Warner Bros. Pictures, DC Films		December 25, 2020
Ill: Final Contagium	Lucio A Rojas, Lorenzo Zannoni, Domiziano, Kristhoparo	Ximena Del Solar, Felipe Rios, Chiara Pavoni, Max Evans.	Italy-Chile-Germany	Fascinante films		September 25, 2020
2021
Antlers	Scott Cooper	Keri Russell, Jesse Plemons, Jeremy T. Thomas, Graham Greene, Scott Haze, Rory Cochrane, Amy Madigan	United States	Searchlight Pictures, Double Dare Productions, Phantom Four		October 29, 2021
Apps	Lucio A. Rojas, Sandra Arriagada, Josè Miguel Zúñiga, Camilo León, Samot Márquez	Tutú Vidaurre, Clara Kovacic, Fernanda Finterbusch, León Arriagada, Néstor Cantillana, Nicolás Durán, Ignacia Uribe. Ximena del Solar.	Chile, Argentina	Fascinante Films, Mastodonte, Femtastica Films, Pragma Films		July 10, 2021
Bright: Samurai Soul	Kyōhei Ishiguro	Yūki Nomura, Daisuke Hirakawa, Shion Wakayama, Miyavi, Maaya Sakamoto, Kenjiro Tsuda, Chafurin, Mamoru Miyano, Kenichi Suzumura	United States, Japan	Netflix, Arect		October 12, 2021
Candyman	Nia DaCosta	Yahya Abdul-Mateen II, Teyonah Parris, Nathan Stewart-Jarrett, Colman Domingo	United States	Universal Pictures, Monkeypaw Productions		August 27, 2021
Cinderella	Kay Cannon	Camila Cabello, Billy Porter, Idina Menzel, Nicholas Galitzine, James Corden, John Mulaney, Minnie Driver, Pierce Brosnan	United States	Columbia Pictures, Fulwell 73		July 16, 2021
Dynasty Warriors	Roy Chow	Louis Koo, Carina Lau, Wang Kai, Tony Yang, Han Geng, Justin Cheung, Gulnazar, Ray Lui	Hong Kong, China	Newport Entertainment		April 29, 2021
Encanto	Byron Howard, Jared Bush	Stephanie Beatriz, María Cecilia Botero, John Leguizamo, Mauro Castillo, Jessica Darrow, Angie Cepeda, Carolina Gaitán, Diane Guerrero, Wilmer Valderrama	United States	Walt Disney Pictures, Walt Disney Animation Studios		November 24, 2021
Freaks Out	Gabriele Mainetti	Claudio Santamaria, Pietro Castellitto, Giancarlo Martini, Aurora Giovinazzo, Giorgio Tirabassi, Max Mazzotta, Franz Rogowski	Italy	Goon Films, Lucky Red, Rai Cinema		October 28, 2021
Ghostbusters: Afterlife	Jason Reitman	Carrie Coon, Finn Wolfhard, Mckenna Grace, Annie Potts, Ernie Hudson, Paul Rudd	United States	Columbia Pictures, Bron Creative, Ghost Corps, The Montecito Picture Company, Right of Way Films		November 11, 2021
Jungle Cruise	Jaume Collet-Serra	Dwayne Johnson, Emily Blunt, Édgar Ramírez, Jack Whitehall, Jesse Plemons, Paul Giamatti	United States	Walt Disney Studios Motion Pictures, Seven Bucks Productions, Davis Entertainment, Flynn Picture Company		July 30, 2021
Luca	Enrico Casarosa	Jacob Tremblay, Jack Dylan Grazer, Emma Berman, Saverio Raimondo, Maya Rudolph, Marco Barricelli, Jim Gaffigan	United States	Walt Disney Pictures, Pixar, Disney+		July 11, 2021
Mortal Kombat	Simon McQuoid	Lewis Tan, Jessica McNamee, Josh Lawson, Tadanobu Asano, Mehcad Brooks, Ludi Lin, Chin Han, Joe Taslim, Hiroyuki Sanada	United States	Warner Bros. Pictures, New Line Cinema, Atomic Monster		April 23, 2021
Nightbooks	David Yarovesky	Krysten Ritter, Winslow Fegley, Lidya Jewett	United States	Netflix, Ghost House Pictures		September 15, 2021
Old	M. Night Shyamalan	Gael García Bernal, Vicky Krieps, Rufus Sewell, Ken Leung, Nikki Amuka-Bird, Abbey Lee, Aaron Pierre, Alex Wolff, Embeth Davidtz, Eliza Scanlen, Emun Elliott, Kathleen Chalfant, Thomasin McKenzie	United States	Universal Pictures, Blinding Edge Pictures		July 23, 2021
Peter Rabbit 2: The Runaway	Will Gluck	Rose Byrne, Domhnall Gleeson, David Oyelowo, Elizabeth Debicki, Lennie James, Margot Robbie, James Corden	United States, Australia, United Kingdom	Columbia Pictures, Animal Logic, MRC, 2.0 Entertainment, Olive Bridge Entertainment		March 25, 2021
Raya and the Last Dragon	Don Hall, Carlos López Estrada	Kelly Marie Tran, Awkwafina, Izaac Wang, Gemma Chan, Daniel Dae Kim, Benedict Wong, Sandra Oh, Thalia Tran, Lucille Soong, Alan Tudyk	United States	Walt Disney Pictures, Walt Disney Animation Studios		March 5, 2021
Secret Magic Control Agency	Aleksey Tsitsilin	Nicholas Corda, Sylvana Joyce, Alyson Rosenfeld, Courtney Shaw, Erica Schroeder, Marc Thompson	Russia, United States	Wizart Animation, CTB Film Company, QED International, Sony Pictures Releasing, Netflix		March 18, 2021
Shang-Chi and the Legend of the Ten Rings	Destin Daniel Cretton	Simu Liu, Awkwafina, Meng'er Zhang, Fala Chen, Florian Munteanu, Benedict Wong, Michelle Yeoh, Ben Kingsley, Tony Leung	United States	Walt Disney Studios Motion Pictures, Marvel Studios		September 3, 2022
Space Jam: A New Legacy	Malcolm D. Lee	LeBron James, Don Cheadle, Khris Davis, Sonequa Martin-Green, Cedric Joe, Jeff Bergman, Eric Bauza, Zendaya	United States	Warner Bros. Pictures, Warner Animation Group, Proximity Media, SpringHill Entertainment		July 16, 2021
The Conjuring: The Devil Made Me Do It	Michael Chaves	Patrick Wilson, Vera Farmiga, Ruairi O'Connor, Sarah Catherine Hook, Julian Hilliard	United States	Warner Bros. Pictures, New Line Cinema, The Safran Company, Atomic Monster		June 4, 2021
The Great Yokai War: Guardians	Takashi Miike	Kokoro Terada, Hana Sugisaki, Sakura Ando, Takahiro Miura, Yuko Oshima, Eiji Akaso, Renji Ishibashi, Kenichi Endō, Akira Emoto, Nanako Matsushima, Kazuki Kitamura, Nao Ōmori, Takao Osawa	Japan	OLM, Toho, Kadokawa Pictures		August 13, 2020
The Green Knight	David Lowery	Dev Patel, Alicia Vikander, Joel Edgerton, Sarita Choudhury, Sean Harris, Kate Dickie, Barry Keoghan, Ralph Ineson	United States	A24, Ley Line Entertainment, Bron Studios, Sailor Bear		July 31, 2021
The Last Warrior: Root of Evil	Dmitriy Dyachenko	Viktor Khorinyak, Mila Sivatskaya, Ekaterina Vilkova, Elena Yakovleva, Konstantin Lavronenko, Sergey Burunov, Yelena Valyushkina, Kirill Zaytsev, Timofey Tribuntsev, Garik Kharlamov	Russia	Walt Disney Studios Motion Pictures, CIS, Yellow, Black & White, Russia-1, Cinema Fund		January 1, 2021
The Last Warrior: A Messenger of Darkness	Dmitriy Dyachenko	Viktor Khorinyak, Mila Sivatskaya, Ekaterina Vilkova, Elena Yakovleva, Konstantin Lavronenko, Sergey Burunov, Yelena Valyushkina, Kirill Zaytsev, Garik Kharlamov, Timofey Tribuntsev	Russia	Walt Disney Studios Motion Pictures, CIS, Yellow, Black & White, Russia-1, Cinema Fund		December 23, 2021
The North Wind	Renata Litvinova	Renata Litvinova, Anton Shagin, Sofya Ernst, Galina Tyunina, Tatyana Piletskaya, Svetlana Khodchenkova, Nikita Kukushkin, Ulyana Dobrovskaya	Russia	Sony Pictures Releasing, Fond Zapredelye		February 6, 2021
The Witcher: Nightmare of the Wolf	Kwang Il Han	Theo James, Lara Pulver, Graham McTavish, Mary McDonnell	United States	Netflix, Studio Mir		August 23, 2021
Trollhunters: Rise of the Titans	Johane Matte, Francisco Ruiz Velasco, Andrew Schmidt	Emile Hirsch, Lexi Medrano, Charlie Saxton, Kelsey Grammer, Fred Tatasciore, Tatiana Maslany, Diego Luna, Nick Offerman, Colin O'Donoghue, Alfred Molina, Steven Yeun, Cole Sand	United States	Netflix, DreamWorks Animation, Double Dare Productions		July 21, 2021
Upon the Magic Roads	Oleg Pogodin	Anton Shagin, Pavel Derevyanko, Paulina Andreeva, Mikhail Yefremov, Yan Tsapnik, Oleg Taktarov, Lyasan Utiasheva, Aleksandr Semchev	Russia	Sony Pictures Releasing, CTB Film Company, Russia-1, CGF Company, Cinema Fund		March 11, 2021
2022
A Fairy Tale After All	Erik Peter Carlson	Emily Shenaut, Brian Hull, Gabriel Burrafato, Bridget Winder, Timothy N. Kopacz, Anna Brisbin	United States	Vertical Entertainment		February 18, 2022
Black Adam	Jaume Collet-Serra	Dwayne Johnson, Noah Centineo, Aldis Hodge, Sarah Shahi, Quintessa Swindell, Pierce Brosnan	United States	Warner Bros. Pictures, DC Films, Seven Bucks Productions		October 21, 2022
Brahmāstra	Ayan Mukerji	Amitabh Bachchan, Ranbir Kapoor, Alia Bhatt, Mouni Roy, Nagarjuna Akkineni	India	Fox Star Studios, Dharma Productions		September 2, 2022
Disenchanted	Adam Shankman	Amy Adams, Patrick Dempsey, Idina Menzel, James Marsden, Maya Rudolph, Yvette Nicole Brown, Jayma Mays	United States	Disney+		November 18, 2022
Fantastic Beasts: The Secrets of Dumbledore	David Yates	Eddie Redmayne, Katherine Waterston, Dan Fogler, Alison Sudol, Ezra Miller, Callum Turner, William Nadylam, Poppy Corby-Tuech, Jessica Williams, Jude Law, Mads Mikkelsen	United States	Warner Bros. Pictures, Heyday Films		April 15, 2022
Hocus Pocus 2	Anne Fletcher	Bette Midler, Sarah Jessica Parker, Kathy Najimy, Sam Richardson, Tony Hale	United States	Disney+		September 30, 2022
Hotel Transylvania: Transformania	Jeniffer Kluska, Derek Drymon	Brian Hull, Andy Samberg, Selena Gomez, Kathryn Hahn, Steve Buscemi, David Spade, Keegan-Michael Key, Asher Blinkoff, Brad Abrell, Fran Drescher, Jim Gaffigan, Molly Shannon	United States	Prime Video, Columbia Pictures, Sony Pictures Animation, Perfect World Pictures, MRC		January 14, 2022
Luck	Peggy Holmes	Jane Fonda, Whoopi Goldberg	United States	Apple TV+, Skydance Animation		August 5, 2022
Minions: The Rise of Gru	Kyle Balda	Pierre Coffin, Steve Carell, Taraji P. Henson, Michelle Yeoh, RZA, Jean-Claude Van Damme, Lucy Lawless, Dolph Lundgren, Danny Trejo, Russell Brand, Julie Andrews, Alan Arkin	United States	Universal Pictures, Illumination		July 1, 2022
My Father's Dragon	Nora Twomey		United States, Ireland	Netflix, Netflix Animation, Cartoon Saloon, Mockingbird Pictures, Parallel Films		November 11, 2022
Nahuel and the Magic Book	German Acuna	Consuelo Pizarro, Muriel Binavides, Marcelo Liapiz, Sebastian Dupont, Vanessa Silva, Sandro Larenas, Jorge Lillo	Chile, Brazil	Carburadores; Levante Filmes; Punkrobot Animation Studios; Red Animation Studios; Dragao Studios; LMS Studios; Draftoons Studios		January 20, 2022
Puss in Boots: The Last Wish	Joel Crawford	Antonio Banderas, Salma Hayek, Olivia Colman, Harvey Guillén, Samson Kayo, Wagner Moura, Anthony Mendez, John Mulaney, Florence Pugh, Da'Vine Joy Randolph, Ray Winstone	United States	Universal Pictures, DreamWorks Animation		December 21, 2022
Slumberland	Francis Lawrence	Marlow Barkley, Jason Momoa, Weruche Opia, India de Beaufort, Kyle Chandler, Chris O'Dowd	United States	Netflix, Chernin Entertainment		November 18, 2022
Sonic the Hedgehog 2	Jeff Fowler	Ben Schwartz, James Marsden, Tika Sumpter, Jim Carrey	United States	Paramount Pictures, Sega Sammy Group, Original Film, Marza Animation Planet, Blur Studio		April 8, 2022
The Amazing Maurice	Toby Genkel, Florian Westermann	Hugh Laurie, Emilia Clarke, David Thewlis, Himesh Patel, Gemma Arterton, Hugh Bonneville	United Kingdom, Germany	Sky Cinema, Now		November 13, 2022
The Haunted House: The Dimensional Goblin and the Seven Worlds	Byun Young-kyu	Jo Hyeon-jeong, Kim Young-eun, Kim Chae-ha, Kang Sae-bom, Yang Jeong-hwa	South Korea	CJ ENM, Studio BAZOOKA		December 14, 2022
The School for Good and Evil	Paul Feig	Sophia Anne Caruso, Sofia Wylie, Laurence Fishburne, Michelle Yeoh, Jamie Flatters, Kit Young, Peter Serafinowicz, Kerry Washington, Charlize Theron	United States	Netflix, Roth/Kirschenbaum Films, Feigco Entertainment		October 19, 2022
The Sea Beast	Chris Williams	Karl Urban, Zaris-Angel Hator, Jared Harris, Marianne Jean-Baptiste	United States	Netflix, Netflix Animation		July 8, 2022
Three Thousand Years of Longing	George Miller	Idris Elba, Tilda Swinton	United States	Amazon Prime Video, Metro-Goldwyn-Mayer		August 31, 2022
Turning Red	Domee Shi	Rosalie Chiang, Sandra Oh	United States	Walt Disney Pictures, Disney+, Pixar		March 11, 2022
Brahmāstra: Part One – Shiva	Ayan Mukerji	Ranbir Kapoor, Alia Bhatt Amitabh Bachchan	India	Dharma Productions		September 10, 2022
2023
Aquaman and the Lost Kingdom	James Wan	Jason Momoa, Amber Heard, Willem Dafoe, Patrick Wilson, Dolph Lundgren, Yahya Abdul-Mateen II, Temuera Morrison, Nicole Kidman	United States	Warner Bros. Pictures, DC Films, The Safran Company, Atomic Monster		December 22, 2023
Barbie	Greta Gerwig	Margot Robbie, Ryan Gosling	United States	Warner Bros. Pictures, Heyday Films, NB/GG Pictures, LuckyChap Entertainment, Mattel Films		July 21, 2023
Dark Harvest	David Slade	Casey Likes, E'myri Crutchfield, Jeremy Davies, Elizabeth Reaser, Luke Kirby	United States	Metro-Goldwyn-Mayer		October 11, 2023
Dungeons & Dragons: Honor Among Thieves	John Francis Daley, Jonathan Goldstein	Chris Pine, Michelle Rodriguez, Justice Smith, Regé-Jean Page, Hugh Grant, Sophia Lillis	United States	Paramount Pictures, eOne		March 31, 2023
Evil Dead Rise	Lee Cronin	Alyssa Sutherland, Lily Sullivan, Gabrielle Echols, Morgan Davies, Nell Fisher	United States	Warner Bros. Pictures, New Line Cinema, Ghost House Pictures		April 21, 2023
Insidious: The Red Door	Patrick Wilson	Rose Byrne, Patrick Wilson, Ty Simpkins	United States	Sony Pictures Releasing, Blumhouse Productions		July 7, 2023
Knights of the Zodiac	Tomasz Bagiński	Sean Bean, Madison Iseman, Famke Janssen	United States, Japan	Sony Pictures Entertainment, Toei Company		April 28, 2023
Nimona	Nick Bruno and Troy Quane	Chloë Grace Moretz	United States	Netflix, Annapurna Pictures		June 30, 2023
Shazam! Fury of the Gods	David F. Sandberg	Zachary Levi, Asher Angel, Jack Dylan Grazer, Faithe Herman, Grace Fulton, Ian Chen, Jovan Armand, Marta Milans, Cooper Andrews, Rachel Zegler, Lucy Liu, Helen Mirren	United States	Warner Bros. Pictures, DC Films, The Safran Company		March 17, 2023
The Little Mermaid	Rob Marshall	Halle Bailey, Jonah Hauer-King, Daveed Diggs, Jacob Tremblay, Awkwafina, Javier Bardem, Melissa McCarthy	United States	Walt Disney Pictures, Lucamar Productions, Marc Platt Productions		May 26, 2023
The Super Mario Bros. Movie	Aaron Horvath, Michael Jelenic	Chris Pratt, Anya Taylor-Joy, Charlie Day, Jack Black, Keegan-Michael Key, Seth Rogen, Fred Armisen	United States	Universal Pictures, Illumination, Nintendo		April 5, 2023
Wish	Chris Buck, Fawn Veerasunthorn	Ariana DeBose, Chris Pine, Alan Tudyk	United States	Walt Disney Pictures, Walt Disney Animation Studios		November 22, 2023
Wonka	Paul King	Timothée Chalamet, Keegan-Michael Key, Rowan Atkinson, Sally Hawkins, Olivia Colman, Jim Carter	United States	Warner Bros. Pictures, Heyday Films		December 15, 2023
2024
Beetlejuice Beetlejuice	Tim Burton	Michael Keaton, Winona Ryder, Catherine O'Hara, Jenna Ortega, Justin Theroux, Monica Bellucci, Willem Dafoe	United States	Warner Bros. Pictures, Plan B Entertainment, Tim Burton Productions		September 6, 2024
Damsel	Juan Carlos Fresnadillo	Millie Bobby Brown, Ray Winstone, Nick Robinson, Shohreh Aghdashloo, Angela Bassett, Robin Wright	United States	Netflix, Roth/Kirschenbaum Films		March 8, 2024
Harold and the Purple Crayon	Carlos Saldanha	Zachary Levi, Lil Rel Howery, Zooey Deschanel, Ravi Patel, Camille Guaty, Tanya Reynolds, Pete Gardner	United States	Columbia Pictures, Davis Entertainment		August 2, 2024
Hot Frosty	Jerry Ciccoritti	Lacey Chabert, Dustin Milligan, Craig Robinson	United States	Netflix		November 13, 2024
IF	John Krasinski	Ryan Reynolds, John Krasinski, Phoebe Waller-Bridge, Fiona Shaw, Steve Carell, Alan Kim, Cailey Fleming, Louis Gossett Jr.	United States	Paramount Pictures, Maximum Effort		May 17, 2024
Moana 2	David G. Derrick Jr.	Auliʻi Cravalho, Dwayne Johnson	United States	Walt Disney Pictures, Walt Disney Animation Studios		November 27, 2024
Mufasa: The Lion King	Barry Jenkins	Aaron Pierre, Kelvin Harrison Jr., John Kani, Seth Rogen, Billy Eichner, Tiffany Boone, Donald Glover, Mads Mikkelsen, Thandiwe Newton, Lennie James, Blue Ivy Carter, Beyoncé Knowles-Carter	United States	Walt Disney Pictures, Pastel Productions		December 20, 2024
Sonic the Hedgehog 3	Jeff Fowler	Jim Carrey, Ben Schwartz, James Marsden, Tika Sumpter, Idris Elba, Colleen O'Shaughnessey, Keanu Reeves	United States	Paramount Pictures, Sega Sammy Group, Original Film		December 20, 2024
Spellbound	Vicky Jenson	Rachel Zegler, Nicole Kidman, Javier Bardem, Tituss Burgess, John Lithgow, Jenifer Lewis, Nathan Lane	United States	Netflix, Skydance Animation		November 22, 2024
That Christmas	Simon Otto	Brian Cox, Fiona Shaw, Jodie Whittaker and Bill Nighy (cast leaders)	United Kingdom	Netflix; Locksmith Animation		December 4, 2024
The Lord of the Rings: The War of the Rohirrim	Kenji Kamiyama	Brian Cox, Gaia Wise, Luke Pasqualino, Miranda Otto, Laurence Ubong Williams, Shaun Dooley	United States, Japan	Warner Bros. Pictures, New Line Cinema, Warner Bros. Animation, Sola Digital Arts		December 13, 2024
The Tiger's Apprentice	Raman Hui	Henry Golding, Sandra Oh, Michelle Yeoh, Brandon Soo Hoo, Bowen Yang, Sherry Cola, Kheng Hua Tan, Lucy Liu	United States	Paramount+, Paramount Animation		February 2, 2024
Wicked	Jon M. Chu	Ariana Grande, Cynthia Erivo	United States	Universal Pictures, Marc Platt Productions		November 22, 2024
Wonderland	Kim Tae-yong	Bae Suzy, Choi Woo-shik, Jung Yu-mi, Park Bo-gum, Tang Wei	South Korea	Bom Film Productions, Kirin Productions, Acemaker Movieworks, Netflix		June 5, 2024
2025
A Minecraft Movie	Jared Hess	Jason Momoa, Jack Black, Danielle Brooks, Emma Myers, Sebastian Hansen	United States	Warner Bros. Pictures, Legendary Entertainment		April 4, 2025
Death of a Unicorn	Alex Scharfman	Paul Rudd, Jenna Ortega, Richard E. Grant, Téa Leoni, and Will Poulter	United States	A24, Ley Line Entertainment		March 28, 2025
Fountain of Youth	Guy Ritchie	John Krasinski, Natalie Portman, Domhnall Gleeson, Eiza González, Laz Alonso, Arian Moayed, Carmen Ejogo	United States	Apple TV+, Skydance Media		May 23, 2025
How to Train Your Dragon	Dean DeBlois	Mason Thames, Nico Parker, Gerard Butler, Nick Frost, Julian Dennison, Gabriel Howell, Bronwyn James, Harry Trevaldwyn, Ruth Codd	United States	Universal Pictures, DreamWorks Animation, Marc Platt Productions		June 13, 2025
I Am Frankelda	Arturo and Roy Ambriz	Mireya Mendoza, Arturo Mercado Jr., Luis Leonardo Suárez, Carlos Segundo, Beto Castillo, Assira Abbate, Anahí Allué, Arturo Ambriz, Lourdes Ambriz, Roy Ambriz, Antonio Badía, Sergio Carranza, Jesse Conde, Idzi Dulkiewicz, Karla Falcón, Magda Giner, Juan Pablo Monterrubio, Habana Zoe	Mexico	Cinema Fantasma; Warner Bros. Discovery; Cine Vendaval; Woo Films		October 25, 2025
KPop Demon Hunters	Maggie Kang, Chris Appelhans	Arden Cho, Ahn Hyo-seop, May Hong, Ji-young Yoo, Yunjin Kim, Joel Kim Booster, Liza Koshy, Daniel Dae Kim, Ken Jeong, Byung-hun Lee	United States	Netflix, Columbia Pictures, Sony Pictures Animation		June 20, 2025
Red Sonja	M. J. Bassett	Matilda Lutz, Wallis Day, Robert Sheehan, Michael Bisping, Martyn Ford, Eliza Matengu, Rhona Mitra, Veronica Ferres	United States	Millennium Films, Mark Canton Productions		August 15, 2025
Snow White	Marc Webb	Rachel Zegler, Gal Gadot, Andrew Burnap, Martin Klebba	United States	Walt Disney Pictures		March 21, 2025
The Ice Tower	Lucile Hadžihalilović	Marion Cotillard, Clara Pacini, August Diehl, Gaspar Noé	France	Metropolitan Filmexport, 3B Productions, ARTE France Cinéma, Sutor Kolonko, Albolina Film		September 17, 2025
The Legend Hunters	Simon West, Li Yifan	Zhang Hanyu, Jiang Wu, Celina Jade	China	Wanda Pictures, Saints Entertainment		May 8, 2025
The Legend of Ochi	Isaiah Saxon	Helena Zengel, Finn Wolfhard, Emily Watson, Willem Dafoe	United States	A24, AGBO, IPR.VC, Access Entertainment		April 25, 2025
The Twits	Phil Johnston	Natalie Portman, Emilia Clarke, Margo Martindale, Johnny Vegas	United States	Netflix		October 17, 2025
Wicked: For Good	Jon M. Chu	Ariana Grande, Cynthia Erivo	United States	Universal Pictures, Marc Platt Productions		November 21, 2025
2026
Forgotten Island	Joel Crawford, Januel Mercado	H.E.R., Liza Soberano, Lea Salonga, Dave Franco, Manny Jacinto, Jenny Slate	United States	Universal Pictures, DreamWorks Animation		September 25, 2026
Masters of the Universe	Travis Knight	Nicholas Galitzine, Camila Mendes, Alison Brie, Idris Elba, Morena Baccarin, Jóhannes Haukur Jóhannesson, Jared Leto, James Purefoy, Charlotte Riley	United States	Amazon MGM Studios, Mattel Films, Escape Artists		June 5, 2026
Moana	Thomas Kail	Catherine Laga'aia, Dwayne Johnson, John Tui, Frankie Adams, Rena Owen	United States	Walt Disney Pictures, Seven Bucks Productions		July 10, 2026
Mortal Kombat II	Simon McQuoid	Lewis Tan, Karl Urban, Jessica McNamee, Tadanobu Asano, Mehcad Brooks, Ludi Lin, Chin Han, Joe Taslim, Hiroyuki Sanada	United States	Warner Bros. Pictures, New Line Cinema, Atomic Monster		May 15, 2026
Practical Magic 2	Susanne Bier	Sandra Bullock, Nicole Kidman, Joey King, Xolo Maridueña, Maisie Williams, Lee Pace, Stockard Channing, Dianne Wiest	United States	Warner Bros. Pictures, Fortis Films, Blossom Films		September 10, 2026
Steps	Alyce Tzue, John Ripa	Ali Wong, Amanda Seyfried, Stephanie Hsu, Nikki Glaser, Daniel Radcliffe, Young Mazino, Peter Dinklage, Bette Midler	United States	Netflix, Netflix Animation Studios, Paper Kite Productions		November 20, 2026
The Cat in the Hat	Erica Rivinoja, Alessandro Carloni	Bill Hader, Quinta Brunson, Bowen Yang, Xochitl Gomez, Matt Berry, Paula Pell	United States	Warner Bros. Pictures, Warner Bros. Pictures Animation, Dr. Seuss Enterprises		November 6, 2026
The Odyssey	Christopher Nolan	Matt Damon, Tom Holland, Anne Hathaway, Zendaya, Lupita Nyong'o, Robert Pattinson, Charlize Theron, Jon Bernthal, Benny Safdie, John Leguizamo, Elliot Page, Himesh Patel, Bill Irwin, Samantha Morton, Jesse Garcia, Will Yun Lee, Rafi Gavron, Shiloh Fernandez, Corey Hawkins, Mia Goth	United States	Universal Pictures, Syncopy Inc.		July 17, 2026
The Super Mario Galaxy Movie	Aaron Horvath, Michael Jelenic	Chris Pratt, Anya Taylor-Joy, Charlie Day, Jack Black, Keegan-Michael Key, Benny Safdie, Donald Glover, Issa Rae, Luis Guzman, Kevin Michael Richardson, Brie Larson, Glen Powell	United States	Universal Pictures, Illumination, Nintendo		April 1, 2026
Wildwood	Travis Knight	Peyton Elizabeth Lee, Jacob Tremblay, Carey Mulligan, Mahershala Ali, Awkwafina, Angela Bassett, Jake Johnson, Charlie Day, Amandla Stenberg, Jemaine Clement, Maya Erskine, Tantoo Cardinal, Tom Waits, Richard E. Grant	United States	Laika		October 23, 2026

== Forthcoming ==
Title	Director	Cast	Country	Studios	Ref.	Release date
2026
Hexed	Fawn Veerasunthorn, Jason Hand	Hailee Steinfeld, Rashida Jones	United States	Walt Disney Pictures, Walt Disney Animation Studios		November 25, 2026
Jumanji: Open World	Jake Kasdan	Dwayne Johnson, Jack Black, Kevin Hart, Karen Gillan	United States	Columbia Pictures, Seven Bucks Productions, Matt Tolmach Productions		December 25, 2026
2027
A Minecraft Movie Squared	Jared Hess	Jason Momoa, Jack Black, Kirsten Dunst, Danielle Brooks, Matt Berry	United States	Warner Bros. Pictures, Legendary Entertainment		July 23, 2027
Bad Fairies	Megan Nicole Dong	Cynthia Erivo, Ncuti Gatwa	United Kingdom; United States	Warner Bros. Pictures Animation; Locksmith Animation		May 21, 2027
Children of Blood and Bone	Gina Prince-Bythewood	Thuso Mbedu, Tosin Cole, Amandla Stenberg, Damson Idris, Lashana Lynch, Idris Elba, Chiwetel Ejiofor, Cynthia Erivo, Viola Davis, Ayra Starr, Regina King	United States	Paramount Pictures, Temple Hill Entertainment		January 15, 2027
Frozen 3	Jennifer Lee	Josh Gad, Idina Menzel, Kristen Bell	United States	Walt Disney Pictures, Walt Disney Animation Studios		November 24, 2027
High in the Clouds	Toby Genkel	Himesh Patel, Hannah Waddingham, Idris Elba, Pom Klementieff, Paul McCartney, Ringo Starr, Lionel Richie, Alain Chabat, Jimmy Fallon, Celine Dion, Clémence Poésy	United States, France, United Kingdom	Gaumont, Gaumont Animation, MPL Communications		July 7, 2027
How to Train Your Dragon 2	Dean DeBlois	Mason Thames	United States	Universal Pictures, DreamWorks Animation, Marc Platt Productions		June 11, 2027
Lizard Music	Benny Safdie	Dwayne Johnson, Theo Clark Leber, Tim Heidecker, Alicia Silverstone, Regina Hall, Andrew Dice Clay, Colman Domingo, Jeff Goldblum, Rachel McAdams, David Krumholtz	United States	Amazon MGM Studios, United Artists, Seven Bucks Productions		December 25, 2027
Narnia: The Magician's Nephew	Greta Gerwig	David McKenna, Beatrice Campbell, Emma Mackey, Carey Mulligan, Ciarán Hinds, Daniel Craig, Meryl Streep	United States	Netflix, Pascal Pictures, Entertainment One		February 12, 2027
Shrek 5	Conrad Vernon, Walt Dohrn	Mike Myers, Eddie Murphy, Cameron Diaz, Zendaya, Skyler Gisondo, Marcello Hernández	United States	Universal Pictures, DreamWorks Animation		June 30, 2027
Sonic the Hedgehog 4	Jeff Fowler	Ben Schwartz, Kristen Bell	United States	Paramount Pictures, Sega Sammy Group, Original Film		March 19, 2027
The Amazing Maurice - The Waters of Life	Toby Genkel, Florian Westermann	Hugh Laurie, Emilia Clarke, David Thewlis, Himesh Patel, Gemma Arterton, Hugh Bonneville	United Kingdom, Germany	Sky Cinema, Now		2027
The Haunting of Hotel Transylvania	Jennifer Kluska, Alan Hawkins		United States	Sony Pictures Animation		October 8, 2027
The Legend of Zelda	Wes Ball	Bo Bragason, Benjamin Evan Ainsworth, Uli Latukefu, Dichen Lachman, Yvonne Strahovski, Lydia Peckham, Sam Neill	United States	Columbia Pictures, Nintendo, Arad Productions		April 30, 2027
The Lord of the Rings: The Hunt for Gollum	Andy Serkis	Andy Serkis, Kate Winslet, Leo Woodall, Jamie Dornan, Lee Pace, Elijah Wood, Ian McKellen	United States	Warner Bros. Pictures, New Line Cinema, WingNut Films		December 17, 2027
The Mummy: Book of the Dead	Matt Bettinelli-Olpin, Tyler Gillett	Brendan Fraser, Rachel Weisz, John Hannah	United States	Universal Pictures, Relativity Media		October 15, 2027
2028
Elden Ring	Alex Garland	Kit Connor, Cailee Spaeny, Ben Whishaw Nick Offerman, Tom Burke, Havana Rose Liu, Sonoya Mizuno, Emma Laird, Peter Serafinowicz, Jonathan Pryce	United States	A24, DNA Films, Bandai Namco Filmworks		March 3, 2028
Gremlins 3	Chris Columbus		United States	Warner Bros. Pictures, Amblin Entertainment		October 6, 2028
Oh, the Places You'll Go!	Jon M. Chu, Jill Culton	Ariana Grande, Josh Gad	United States	Warner Bros. Pictures, Warner Bros. Pictures Animation, Dr. Seuss Enterprises, Bad Robot Productions		March 17, 2028
Tangled	Michael Gracey	Teagan Croft, Kathryn Hahn, Milo Manheim, Diego Luna	United States	Walt Disney Pictures, Burr Productions		March 31, 2028
Films in development
10-31	Gigi Saul Guerrero		United States	Amazon Prime Video, Orion Pictures		TBA
Arcane	Corin Hardy		United States	Balboa Productions		TBA
Bewitched	TBA		United States	Columbia Pictures, Davis Entertainment		TBA
Big Trouble in Little China 2	TBA	Dwayne Johnson	United States	20th Century Studios, Seven Bucks Productions		TBA
Black Knight	Genndy Tartakovsky		United States	Columbia Pictures; Sony Pictures Animation		TBA
Dark Army	Paul Feig		United States	Universal Pictures		TBA
Fairy Godmother	Carrie Brownstein		United States	Amazon Prime Video, Metro-Goldwyn-Mayer		TBA
Figment	TBA		United States	Walt Disney Pictures, Point Grey Pictures		TBA
Game of Thrones: Aegon's Conquest	TBA		United States	Warner Bros. Pictures, HBO		TBA
Grendel	Robert D. Krzykowski	Jeff Bridges, Dave Bautista, Sam Elliott, Bryan Cranston, Thomasin McKenzie, Aidan Turner, T Bone Burnett	United States	Jim Henson Company, Palisades Park Pictures, UTA Independent Film Group, CAA Media Finance		TBA
Hercules	Guy Ritchie		United States	Walt Disney Pictures, AGBO		TBA
Highlander	Chad Stahelski	Henry Cavill, Russell Crowe, Dave Bautista, Marisa Abela, Karen Gillan, Djimon Hounsou, Drew McIntyre, Max Zhang, Jeremy Irons	United States	United Artists, Original Film, 87Eleven Entertainment, Thunder Road Films, Davis-Panzer Productions, Bluegrass 7		TBA
Highlander 2	Chad Stahelski	Henry Cavill	United States	United Artists, Original Film, 87Eleven Entertainment, Thunder Road Films, Davis-Panzer Productions, Bluegrass 7		TBA
Highlander 3	Chad Stahelski	Henry Cavill	United States	United Artists, Original Film, 87Eleven Entertainment, Thunder Road Films, Davis-Panzer Productions, Bluegrass 7		TBA
Keepers of the Lost City	TBA		United States	Warner Bros. Pictures		TBA
KPop Demon Hunters 2	Maggie Kang, Chris Appelhans	Arden Cho, May Hong, Ji-young Yoo	United States	Netflix, Sony Pictures Animation		TBA
Labyrinth 2	Robert Eggers		United States	TriStar Pictures, Jim Henson Productions		TBA
Little Monsters	Josh Cooley		United States	Universal Pictures, Mandeville Films		TBA
Mice and Mystics	Alexandre Aja		United States	Universal Pictures, DreamWorks Animation, Vertigo Entertainment		TBA
Nevermoor	Michael Gracey		United States	Paramount Pictures, Goddard Textiles		TBA
Once on This Island	Wanuri Kahiu		United States	Disney+, Walt Disney Pictures, Marc Platt Productions		TBA
Once Upon a One More Time	TBA		United States	Columbia Pictures, Davis Entertainment		TBA
Penelope	TBA		United States	Walt Disney Pictures, Olive Bridge Productions		TBA
Prince Anders	TBA	Billy Magnussen	United States	Disney+, Walt Disney Pictures, Rideback		TBA
Rainbow Serpent	TBA		United States	Paramount Pictures, Imagine Entertainment, Animal Logic		TBA
Ronan Boyle and the Bridge of Riddles	Fergal Reilly		United States	Universal Pictures, DreamWorks Animation		TBA
Sparkerella	TBA	Channing Tatum	United States	Metro-Goldwyn-Mayer, Free Association		TBA
Storybook Ending	Dean DeBlois		United States	Universal Pictures, Anvil Pictures		TBA
Swan Lake	TBA	Felicity Jones	United States	Universal Pictures, Mandeville Films		TBA
The Cruel Prince	TBA		United States	Universal Pictures, Michael De Luca Productions		TBA
The Ice Dragon	TBA		United States	Warner Bros. Pictures, Warner Bros. Pictures Animation		TBA
The Knight	Robert Eggers		United States	Studio 8, Parts and Labor		TBA
The Last Witch Hunter 2	TBA	Vin Diesel, Michael Caine	United States	Summit Entertainment, Mark Canton Productions, One Race Films, Goldmann Pictures		TBA
The Scorpion King	TBA		United States	Universal Pictures, Seven Bucks Productions		TBA
The Sword in the Stone	Juan Carlos Fresnadillo		United States	Walt Disney Pictures		TBA
The Water Dancer	Nia DaCosta		United States	Metro-Goldwyn-Mayer, Plan B Entertainment, Harpo Films		TBA
The Wizards of Once	TBA		United States	Universal Pictures, DreamWorks Animation		TBA
The Wonderful Wizard of Oz	Kenya Barris		United States	Warner Bros. Pictures, New Line Cinema		TBA
Thing One and Thing Two	TBA		United States	Warner Bros. Pictures, Warner Bros. Pictures Animation, Dr. Seuss Enterprises		TBA
Untitled Alice in Wonderland movie musical	Lorene Scafaria	Sabrina Carpenter	United States	Universal Pictures, Marc Platt Productions, At Last Productions, Alloy Entertainment		TBA
Untitled Wicked spinoff film	TBA		United States	Universal Pictures		TBA
Wonka 2	Paul King	Timothée Chalamet	United States	Warner Bros. Pictures, Village Roadshow Pictures, Heyday Films		TBA
Yokai Samba	Leo Matsuda		United States	Paramount Pictures, Paramount Animation, Nickelodeon Movies		TBA
