= Casey Mongillo =

American voice actor

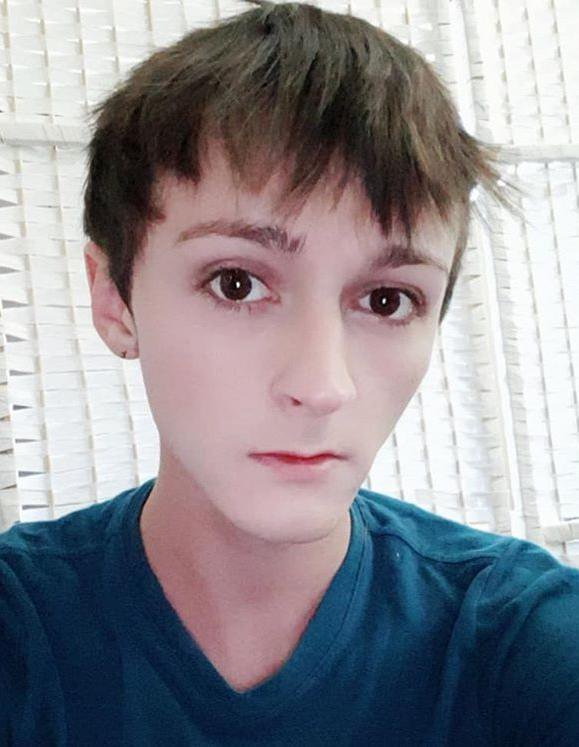
- Mongillo in 2019
- Occupation: Voice actor
- Years active: 2005–present
- Website: caseymongillovoice.wixsite.com/caseymongillo

Casey Kenny Mongillo is an American voice actor who has played roles in animation and video games. They (Note: Mongillo uses any pronouns. (Note: "Casey Kenny Mongillo". Linktree. button labeled "Click me for a surprise". "Any pronouns OK") This article uses they/them for consistency.) are best known for portraying lead character Shinji Ikari in the Netflix English dub of Neon Genesis Evangelion in 2019.

== Career ==
In 2019, Mongillo voiced the main character Shinji Ikari in the Netflix dubbing of the anime series Neon Genesis Evangelion, replacing Spike Spencer, who played the part in the original ADV Films dub.

Noel Kirkpatrick of TV Guide praised Mongillo's portrayal of Shinji, saying they excelled at switching "between sarcasm and sadness, delight and detachment", and that they did "a better job of capturing Shinji's pre-teen voice" than Spencer. Aja Romano of Vox wrote that it was laudable that Netflix cast a non-binary actor to play Shinji. Carol Grant, in an opinion piece for Vice, wrote that Shinji being played by a trans actor made the series feel more queer, saying that "Mongillo's delivery captures the delicate interplay between the masculine and feminine aspects of Shinji's voice and personality, bringing his bodily and gendered anxieties to life".

Mongillo was nominated for Best Performance by a Voice Actor (English) in the Crunchyroll Anime Awards for their performance as Shinji.

== Filmography ==
=== Anime ===
Year	Title	Role	Notes	Source
2013	Zetman	Young Jin Kanzaki		
2013	Queen's Blade Rebellion	Dogor		
2014	Time of Eve	TEX		
2015	Rokka: Braves of the Six Flowers	Rainer Milan		
2017	Mobile Suit Gundam SEED	Nicol Amalfi	NYAV Post dub	
2017	Mobile Suit Gundam SEED Destiny	Nicol Amalfi	NYAV Post dub	
2017	Mob Psycho 100	Shou Suzuki		
2018	Beyblade Burst Turbo	Kimeru, Young Phi		
2018	B the Beginning	Kirisame (young)		
2019	Neon Genesis Evangelion	Shinji Ikari	Netflix dub	
2020	Pokémon	Scorbunny, Allister, Raboot, Cinderace, Goh's Raichu, Chrysa, Wartortle Trainer, Skateboard Kid		
2020	Pokémon: Twilight Wings	Allister, Haunter		
2020	Gleipnir	Isao Kasuga		
2021	So I'm a Spider, So What?	Kyouya Sasajima / Wrath		
2021	Bungo and Alchemist: Gears of Judgement	Haruka		
2021	86	Theoto Rikka		
2021	Tokyo Revengers	Manjirō Sano (young)		
2021–22	JoJo's Bizarre Adventure: Stone Ocean	Emporio	Netflix dub	
2022	Komi Can't Communicate	Nene Onemine	Netflix dub	
2022	Tribe Nine	Haru Shirokane		
2023	Chainsaw Man	Angel Devil		
2024	Delicious in Dungeon	Chilchuck Tims	Netflix dub	
2024	Pokémon Horizons: The Series	Renta		
2024	Ishura	Thien, Kuuro the Cautious		
2025	Mobile Suit Gundam GQuuuuuuX	Kaine		
2025	Chainsaw Man – The Movie: Reze Arc	Angel Devil		
2026	Cosmic Princess Kaguya!	Noi Komazawa	Netflix dub	

=== Animation ===
Year	Title	Role	Notes	Source
2006–08	PvP	Francis Ottoman		
2011–15	TOME: Terrain of Magical Expertise	Gamecrazed, Sofdti		
2018	Miraculous: Tales of Ladybug & Cat Noir	Sandboy	Episode: "Sandboy"	

=== Video games ===
Year	Title	Role	Source
2006	The Ship	Charlie M. Panther, Male Player, others	
2006	Brigade E5: New Jagged Union	Collin Woods, Sylvester McNabb, Tomi Mengazi	
2008	Adventure at the Center of the Earth	Game Announcer	
2008	Grand Chase	Veigas Terre	
2010	Rage of the Gladiator	Gargadan, Chimera's Lion Head	
2010	Red Dead Redemption	Vernon Cherry, Local Population, Zombies	
2010	Heroes of Newerth	High Priestess Parallax, Carnage Calamity	
2010	Star Trek Online	Ambassador Surah	
2015	Neverwinter	Demon Hunter, Mantol-Derith Armor Dealer, Cleric of Moradin, Dhaunira	
2016	The Ship: Remasted	Male Player	
2016	Shadowverse	ROLY-POLY MK, Various	
2018	Octopath Traveler	Additional voices	
2018	Food Fantasy	Long Bao, Omurice, Salad & Sichuan Hotpot	
2019	Monster Prom: Second Term	Zoe	
2019	Shenmue III	Shi Youwen, Yang Wenliang, Tong Zhangping	
2019	Left Alive	Various characters	
2020	Monster Prom 2: Monster Camp	Zoe, Milo Belladonna, Hex	
2020	Vitamin Connection	Selenium	
2020	Bugsnax	Floofty Fizzlebean	
2020	The Elder Scrolls Online	Female Nords, Orcs, Half-Giants	
2021	Ys IX: Monstrum Nox	Zola	
2021	Story of Seasons: Pioneers of Olive Town	Marian	
2021	Shin Megami Tensei V	Protagonist	
2022	Monster Prom 3: Monster Roadtrip	Zoe, Milo Belladonna	
2022	Fire Emblem Heroes	Limstella, Dew (New)	
2022	Omega Strikers	Dubu	
2022	Tower of Fantasy	Crow, Max, Talos	
2022	Goddess of Victory: Nikke	Mustang	
2022	Azure Striker Gunvolt 3	Zed-Omega	
2023	Trinity Trigger	Additional voices	
2023	Komorebi	Klace	
2023	The Legend of Nayuta: Boundless Trails	Nayuta Herschel	
2023	Rune Factory 3 Special	Micah	
2023	Starfield	Keavy Andreas	
2024	Unicorn Overlord	Mercenaries (Type E), additional voices	
2024	Ys X: Nordics	Ezer	
2024	Card-en-Ciel	Blitz Ironcrest, ZedΩ	
2025	Monster Hunter Wilds	Erik	
2025	Monster Prom 4: Monster Con	Zoe, Milo Belladonna	
2025	Rune Factory: Guardians of Azuma	Riku, additional voices	
2025	Towa and the Guardians of the Sacred Tree	Koro	
2026	Neverness to Everness	Edgar	

=== Other dubbing ===
Year	Title	Role	Notes	Source
2019	Osmosis	Billie	Netflix series, English dub	
