= MechWest =

Animated web series

- Genre: Steampunk Western
- Created by: Dave Gallagher
- Written by: Noah Gallagher; Clifford James Taylor
- Directed by: Dave Gallagher
- Voices of: Natalie Rarick; Luis Bermudez; Greg Melton; Truman Florence; Micah Mason; Felicia Valenti; Debbie Grattan; Noah Gallagher; Henry LeBlanc; Brian Hull; Abe Hegewald; Gabriel Ashton Brown
- Composer: Lukša V. Montana
- Original language: English
- No. of episodes: 4

Production
- Producer: Dave Gallagher
- Running time: 23–25 minutes
- Production company: AnimSchool Studios

Original release
- Network: YouTube; Angel Studios
- Release: February 14, 2024 – present

MechWest is an American independent animated web series created by David "Dave" Gallagher and co-produced with his son Noah Gallagher. First released on February 14, 2024, the series is set in a steampunk Wild West environment where mechanical automatons (referred to as "mechs" in the series) live alongside humans. The series has been adapted into a comic book series.

== Synopsis ==
=== Premise ===
MechWest follows Pearl West, a cowgirl who comes across a short, one-eyed mech named Six, who she must protect from being kidnapped by Perajian bandits who are hunting Six down because he runs on a special crystal instead of coal. Pearl and Six, along with her half-brother Pico West and, later on, traveling salesman Casey McCroy, travel from town to town.

=== Setting ===
MechWest is set on a fictional landmass resembling North America, specifically in Meridian, which is bordered by its rival Perajh to the southwest (located in a region roughly analogous to the Baja California peninsula and Sonora) and by Tolmeca (analogous to the rest of Mexico) to the south, as well as by the larger and smaller portions of the Cheyyone Lands to the west and south respectively. Meridian is divided into the West Territory, the Central Territory, and the East Territory. Throughout the series, Perajians raid towns in Meridian's West Territory in search of Six.

== Voice cast ==
=== Main ===
- Natalie Rarick as Pearl West, the half-sister of Pico West and daughter of Reed West who likes to take care of mechs.
- Luis Bermudez as Pico West, the half-brother of Pearl West who is a cowboy.
- Greg Melton as Reed West, the father of Pearl and Pico West.
- Truman Florence as Casey McCroy, a mech salesman who runs a business called McCroy Traveling Mercantile. His wagon is operated by a mech named Skip.
- Micah Mason as Hercai, a Perajian airship commander who leads bandits to raid towns in Meridian in order to find Six.
- Felicia Valenti as Araxa, a woman who oversees the Perajian expedition alongside Hercai.

=== Supporting ===
- Mike Berlak as Lester Bilke
- Debbie Grattan as Irene Samuels, an elderly woman who lives in Fort West.
- Darrell Brown as Sheriff Quinn, a sheriff who works in Fort West.
- Noah Gallagher as Jed, whose yodeling voice is provided by Faith Ore.
- Faith Ore as Looper
- Henry LeBlanc as Cyrus Childs, who resides in Silverton.
- Brian Hull as:
  - Ida Waxman, the mother of Timothy Waxman and owner of Waxman's Casino.
  - Timothy Waxman, the son of Ida Waxman.
  - Krab, who announces games at Waxman's Casino.
- Abe Hegewald as Jesse Curnutt, a friend of Casey McCroy who is also a traveling salesman.
- Gabriel Ashton Brown as Abigail Gates, the cards champion at Waxman's Casino.
- Chloe Mei-li Bundt as Soraya, a Perajian explorer who makes her first appearance by the end of the third episode.

== Episodes ==
No. in series	Title	Original release date
1	"Where the West Begins, Part 1"	February 14, 2024
A short, one-eyed mech named Six enters Fort West and tags along with Pearl for protection from "bad men". Later in the evening, Perajian bandits enter Fort West on an airship and locate Six, but Pearl's half-brother Pico prevents them from taking Six away. In the morning, Pearl and Pico's father Reed receives a letter from Cyrus Childs, announces that he has to leave town to work out the details of Childs' plan to keep Meridian safe, and puts Pearl and Pico in charge of the cattle drive. Back at the barn, Pearl unsuccessfully tries to feed Six coal and learns that he considers coal yucky, and that he instead runs on an alternative energy source.
2	"Where the West Begins, Part 2"	December 14, 2024 (early access); January 24, 2025 (public release)
Pearl brings Six along with Pico by hiding him inside one of the mechanical bulls. That night, Six exits the bull, runs away at Pico's request, and is found by traveling merchant Casey, who takes Six with him, intending to sell him in Centureno. Pearl and Pico resume their voyage and are stopped by Perajian bandits, who deploy scorpion-like mechs to cut the bulls open. After finding out that none of the bulls have Six inside, the bandits fly off in their airship and drop a large, cobra-like mech to find Six. After Six refuses to eat a piece of coal, Casey looks inside of him and learns that he is powered by a crystal. Six is reunited with Pearl and Pico, and they are chased by the Perajian cobra mech into a dead end, where Six lights a stick of dynamite and gives it to Pearl to throw at the cobra. The cobra releases smoke that defuses the dynamite before it enters its mouth. Six gets consumed by the cobra and reignites the dynamite from the inside. The explosion causes Six to lose an arm and experience short-circuiting. Casey offers to help Pearl and Pico take him to Headstone to see a mechanic.
3	"Centureno"	June 27, 2025 (early access); July 23, 2025 (public release)
Whilst helping Pearl, Pico and Six get to Headstone, Casey stops at Centureno and introduces them to his friend Jesse Curnutt, who reattaches Six's arm. Meanwhile, Reed visits Cyrus Childs in Silverton and talks with him about Perajian bandits and the threat they pose to Meridian. After Six is repaired, Casey takes Pearl and Pico to the casino to win money so they can repay him. Casey was banned from gaming there for cheating, so Pearl has to gamble instead. She is forced to bet Six in a game of cards by her challenger, Abigail Gates, who wins the bet and takes Six away to give to Ms. Waxman. Casey enters Ms. Waxman's office to trade his mech Skip for Six and takes him out of the casino to travel with Jesse. Abigail overhears a conversation about Six's uniqueness and tells Ms. Waxman about him, and both women lock Pearl and Pico up in the "cheater chamber". Whilst with Casey and Jesse, Six removes his new arm, sets Jesse's wagon on fire with a tumbleweed, and runs off with Casey back to the casino to break Pearl and Pico out of the cheater chamber. The mechs at the casino are encouraged to revolt. After Six, Pearl and Pico leave town, Casey apologizes for his betrayal, and Six reveals that he stole some money from the casino to pay for a new arm.
4	"The First Ten Minutes"	April 3, 2026
After Pico shoots a mechanical cow, he and Pearl are taken to meet the leader of the Cheyyone.

== Production ==
Dave Gallagher, who worked at Blue Sky Studios for eleven years as a character designer and animator, on films such as Ice Age (2002), Robots (2005), Horton Hears a Who! (2008), and Rio (2011), moved to Utah after Blue Sky Studios was shuttered in April 2021, and founded AnimSchool, which became an online animation program, with audience interest becoming the reason MechWest was started. He later told Cartoon Brew that some of the graduates of this program later worked on the show. The series used Kickstarter and Patreon crowdfunding campaigns to fund the series, and was produced by AnimSchool Studios, a spinoff from AnimSchool.

In 2014, Dave Gallagher first came up with the show's visual image by drawing the robot "Six," and collaboration between Dave and Noah Gallagher began in 2020, with both of them establishing the theme and story. They were joined by Noah's friend Clifford Taylor, who began to co-write the series with him, and production began. A trailer was released in 2022. Inspirations for the show include Avatar: The Last Airbender, which was a shared source of inspiration for Dave and Noah Gallagher. Dave Gallagher also said that the series' look was inspired by "classic Disney, Pixar films, [and] Star Wars."

The series features a "mother-daughter voice over team" of Debbie Grattan voicing Irene Samuels, and Natalie Rarick voicing Pearl West. Both Samuels and Rarick are voice actors from Michiana, Indiana. In January 2023, Dave Gallagher said that over 100 people had worked on the series, and that programs such as Maya, ZBrush, Houdini, Cinema 4D, and Redshift were used in the animation.

The first episode, which premiered in February 2024, garnered over 1.9 million views by January 2025, and 2.2 million views by May 2025. Noah also serves as the story editor for the series. Animation World Network reported, on June 27, 2025, that the show's first three episodes had garnered nearly 3 million views on YouTube.

The series has a planned eight-episode first season, with possible crowdfunding. According to multiple reports, the show's team aimed for wide distribution of the series beyond YouTube, with a goal of distributing the series on Netflix, Prime Video, or on broadcast television, but aimed to create a "dedicated fanbase" of fans on the same platform first.

On November 5, 2025, it was announced on the show's official YouTube channel that free episodes would no longer be available on YouTube, and that all episodes have been moved over to the streaming platform Angel Studios in order to pay high production costs due to a limited budget and the amount of time that the crew of eighty part-time people could devote to this "passion project." Noah Gallagher thanked fans for watching the episodes so far and said the show's crew was unsure of how long they could keep going on YouTube. He described Angel Studios as a "stable home" for the series, noting that it ensures that the series will continue and can "go faster," depending on how well the series does on the platform, with five more episodes for season 1 guaranteed, along with a possible second season, with the show's crew retaining "all creative control" even as some content will continue to be posted on YouTube, but not episodes.

In a post on Angel Studios' official website on November 6, 2025, the streaming platform described MechWest as a series that "blends steampunk flair with classic Western grit." On April 3, the fourth episode of the series was released.

In June 2026 it was announced that Toonz Media Group had "signed a worldwide distribution agreement" for the series, with Animation Magazine describing the series as "one of the industry's most notable indie success stories."

== Accolades ==
Award	Year	Category	Result	Ref.
The Telly Awards	2025	Gold Telly: 3D Animation	Won	
The Telly Awards	2025	Silver Telly: Children	Won	
Collision Awards	2025	Gold Collision Award: Kids & Family	Won	
Collision Awards	2025	Audience Choice	Won	

== Comics ==
In August 2025, AnimSchool Comics published the first issue of a comic book adaptation titled Sheriff Six, which takes place after the events of "Centureno" and centers on Six and Casey McCroy.
