= Monster Prom 2: Monster Camp =

- Developer: Beautiful Glitch
- Publisher: Beautiful Glitch
- Platforms: Linux; macOS; Windows; Nintendo Switch
- Release: WW: October 23, 2020
- Genre: Visual novel
- Modes: Single-player, multiplayer

Monster Prom 2: Monster Camp is a 2020 visual novel developed and published by Beautiful Glitch. Players attempt to romance monsters, as in the previous game in the series, Monster Prom.

== Gameplay ==
Each player controls a young adult monster. After choosing which character to play as and various items that can give bonuses, players compete to romance a non-player character monster. There are five areas. In each one, players attempt to solve various over-the-top problems that affects the group, such as how to escape a serial killer or a wilderness survival scenario in which a character insists players drink their own urine. Players' choices affect how the other monsters see them and often result in black humor. Players can optionally tone down the game's emphasis on various potential triggers, such as sex and drug use. Up to four players can compete, or a single player can play alone.

== Development ==
Beautiful Glitch, a Spanish indie developer, crowd-funded Monster Prom 2: Monster Camp in May 2019. The campaign raised a total of $600K, twenty times the amount of Monster Prom. Compared to Monster Prom, Beautiful Glitch said Monster Camp "feels more mature" and has a "clearer and more consistent" style. Development took about 18 months. Beautiful Glitch released it for Windows on October 23, 2020. They rushed to an October release to avoid extended delays due to holidays. They ported it to the Switch on February 14, 2022.

== Reception ==
Reception

Aggregate scores
Aggregator	Score
Metacritic	(PC) 80/100
OpenCritic	73% recommend

The PC version of Monster Prom 2: Monster Camp received generally favorable reviews from critics, according to the review aggregation website Metacritic. Fellow review aggregator OpenCritic assessed that the game received strong approval, being recommended by 73% of critics. Siliconera called it "a decadent and delicious snack" that is enjoyable either solo or with friends. Hardcore Gamer said it is "pure fun" and praised the gameplay, writing, humor, and multiplayer.
