= Miraculous: Tales of Ladybug & Cat Noir season 1 =

Miraculous: Tales of Ladybug & Cat Noir
- Season 1
- Promotional poster
- No. of episodes: 26

Release
- Original release: October 19, 2015 – October 30, 2016

Season chronology
- Next → Season 2

The first season of Miraculous: Tales of Ladybug & Cat Noir which aired in France from 19 October 2015 to 30 October 2016, totaling 26 episodes.

This season follows Marinette Dupain-Cheng and Adrien Agreste as Ladybug and Cat Noir respectively, as they fight akumatized villains created by Hawk Moth.

== Episodes ==
No. overall	No. in season	English title French title	Directed by	Written by	Original air date (France)	U.S. air date	Prod. code	U.S. viewers (millions)
1	1	"Stormy Weather" "Climatika"	Thomas Astruc	Fred Lenoir	19 October 2015	20 December 2015	101	1.47
Aspiring weather girl Aurore Beauréal loses a competition to be the forecaster for a kids' TV channel. Enraged by the results, the villainous Hawk Moth uses an "akuma", an evil butterfly, to "akumatize" her, turning her into a weather-controlling villain, "Stormy Weather". With the help of their magical "kwami" creatures Tikki and Plagg, teenagers Marinette Dupain-Cheng and Adrien Agreste turn into their superhero personas, "Ladybug" and "Cat Noir" to defeat Stormy Weather, but remain oblivious to each other's secret identities.: This episode was first shown in South Korea on 1 September 2015 as episode 1.
2	2	"The Bubbler" "Le Bulleur"	Thomas Astruc	Thomas Astruc; Sébastien Thibaudeau	20 October 2015	6 December 2015	109	1.40
Fashion designer Gabriel Agreste does not allow his son Adrien to have a birthday party. Adrien's best friend, Nino Lahiffe, is angered by Gabriel's decision; Nino's emotions cause him to be akumatized into the "Bubbler" and traps all adults in floating bubbles with his new powers, before being defeated by Ladybug and Cat Noir. After the Bubbler is defeated, Adrien receives a scarf from Marinette but his father's assistant, Nathalie Sancoeur, claims it is from Gabriel.: This episode was first shown in South Korea on 8 September 2015 as episode 2.
3	3	"The Pharaoh" "Le Pharaon"	Thomas Astruc	Cédric Bacconnier	21 October 2015	10 January 2016	115	1.11
Jalil Kubdel, the assistant curator at the Egyptian exhibit at the Louvre, is rebuffed by his father after wanting to try out an ancient spell. Jalil is akumatized into the "Pharaoh", with the powers of the Egyptian gods.: This episode was first shown in South Korea on 13 October 2015 as episode 7.
4	4	"Lady Wifi"	Thomas Astruc	Sébastien Thibaudeau	22 October 2015	17 January 2016	103	1.43
Marinette's best friend, vlogger Alya Césaire, seeks to find out Ladybug's identity. When she finds Ladybug's "yo-yo" and "mask" in the locker of school bully Chloé Bourgeois, she tries to take a photo, but is noticed. Chloé successfully has her suspended, which allows her to be akumatized into "Lady Wifi", whose smartphone can fire magical icons and can teleport through phones.: This episode was first shown in South Korea on 6 October 2015 as episode 6.
5	5	"Timebreaker" "Chronogirl"	Thomas Astruc	Sébastien Thibaudeau; Michaël Delachenal	23 October 2015	27 December 2015	116	1.17
Marinette's classmates Alix Kubdel and Lê Chiến Kim have a race at the Trocadéro. She entrusts her heirloom pocket watch to her classmates to safeguard it, but it is accidentally destroyed. Alix is akumatized into "Timebreaker", who can make people fade from existence by touching them, giving her the energy to travel back in time.: This episode was first shown in South Korea on 22 September 2015 as episode 4.
6	6	"Mr. Pigeon" "M. Pigeon"	Thomas Astruc	Guillaume Mautalent; Sébastien Oursel	23 October 2015	13 December 2015	106	1.09
Marinette's school, Collège François Dupont, hosts a fashion design competition, which she enters to get Adrien to notice her. Meanwhile, police officer Roger Raincomprix orders Xavier Ramier, a pigeon-loving man, to stop feeding pigeons; the latter is akumatized into "Mr. Pigeon", who can control massive flocks of pigeons. Inspired by this, Marinette creates a pigeon feather derby hat, which wins the competition.: This episode was first shown in South Korea on 29 September 2015 as episode 5.
7	7	"The Evillustrator" "Le Dessinateur"	Thomas Astruc	Matthieu Choquet	26 October 2015	24 January 2016	102	1.18
Artist Nathaniel Kurtzberg, who has a crush on Marinette, falls asleep after drawing in class; when he wakes up, he is mocked by Chloé and sent to the principal's office. He is akumatized into the "Evillustrator", who can draw and erase things in real life with a magical graphics tablet.
8	8	"Rogercop"	Thomas Astruc	Denis Bardiau	27 October 2015	31 January 2016	111	1.18
Plagg is accidentally stuck in Chloé's bracelet, thinking it is camembert, his favorite food. Chloé accuses Marinette of stealing it, and orders her father, Mayor André Bourgeois (who is at school due to a "Career Day") to have Roger arrest her. When he refuses, the Mayor fires him. He is akumatized into "Rogercop", who can force people to enact "sentences" using mind-controlling laser handcuffs.: This episode was first shown in South Korea on 20 October 2015 as episode 8.
9	9	"Copycat" "L'Imposteur"	Thomas Astruc	Sébastien Thibaudeau; Pascal Boutboul	28 October 2015	3 January 2016	108	1.29
Sculptor Théo Barbot unveils a sculpture of Ladybug and Cat Noir. He longs to see Ladybug at the event, but only Cat Noir ends up arriving. He tells Théo that he and Ladybug are in love; feeling jealous, Théo turns into "Copycat". A doppelgänger of Cat Noir complete with the power to use the original's destructive "Cataclysm", he wishes to frame the original for committing crimes.: This episode was first shown in South Korea on 15 September 2015 as episode 3.
10	10	"Dark Cupid" "Dislocœur"	Thomas Astruc	Régis Jaulin	29 October 2015	7 February 2016	105	1.27
On Valentine's Day, Kim attempts to ask Chloé to be his valentine, but he is rejected. He is akumatized into "Dark Cupid", a winged being whose arrows can replace love and friendship with hate.
11	11	"Horrificator"	Thomas Astruc	Fred Lenoir	30 October 2015	21 February 2016	117	1.13
Marinette's class films a horror movie, but Mylène Haprèle, one of the actors, is easily frightened, forcing them to shoot many takes for a single scene. Chloé mocks Mylène's fear, which disappoints her enough to transform into "Horrificator", a slimy monster that grows from people's fear, based on the one from the film.
12	12	"Darkblade" "Le Chevalier Noir"	Thomas Astruc	Matthieu Choquet; Léonie de Rudder	6 December 2015	28 February 2016	114	1.06
It is Paris' mayoral elections and André Bourgeois has defeated Armand D'Argencourt, Collège François Dupont's fencing teacher, by a landslide. When the media mock him, Armand is akumatized into "Darkblade", an armored knight who turns people into knights in order to overthrow Paris.: This episode was first shown in South Korea on 17 November 2015 as episode 12.; The English version of this episode was first shown in Australia on 6 April 2016.
13	13	"The Mime" "Le Mime"	Thomas Astruc	Thomas Astruc; François Charpiat; Michaël Delachenal; Karine Lollichon; Sébastien Thibaudeau	13 December 2015	7 May 2016	119	1.13
Mylène's father, Fred Haprele, is a mime artist about to open a major new performance, but his understudy, Chris, tricks him into missing their bus, allowing Chris to take the role. Disheartened, Fred is akumatized into "The Mime". whose gestures can create real, invisible objects.: Guest star: Josiane Balasko as herself in the French version, her character is renamed Sarah for the international version.; This episode was first shown in South Korea on 24 November 2015 as episode 13.; The English version of this episode was first shown in the UK and Ireland on 26 March 2016.
14	14	"Kung Food"	Thomas Astruc	Matthieu Choquet; Fred Lenoir	10 January 2016	10 September 2016	125	0.93
Marinette's grand uncle, Wang Cheng, visits Paris to participate in a cooking competition. Chloé, who is one of the judges, sabotages Wang's soup, giving him poor results. He is akumatized into "Kung Food", who can create any kind of food-themed weapon.: The English version of this episode was first shown in the UK and Ireland on 2 April 2016.
15	15	"Gamer" "Le Gamer"	Thomas Astruc	Guillaume Mautalent; Sébastien Oursel	17 January 2016	24 September 2016	112	1.19
Collège François Dupont sends two students to represent them at a video game tournament. Since Adrien is one of the candidates, Marinette tries to team up with him. She ends up displacing tech genius Max Kanté, who had been looking forward to participating for a year. With all his training being in vain, Max is akumatized into "Gamer", who uses a real-life version of the game's ship to turn people into "experience points", which upgrades the ship.: Cameo: Thomas Astruc as voice of the start menu of video game in French version.; The English version of this episode was first shown in Australia on 18 April 2016
16	16	"Animan"	Thomas Astruc	Cédric Perrin; Jean-Christophe Hervé	24 January 2016	13 August 2016	113	1.18
Nino develops a crush on Marinette and they go on a date at the zoo. There, Kim mocks the zoo's new panther, which enrages Alya's father Otis, the zookeeper; he is transformed into "Animan", who can shapeshift into any animal, including extinct ones. Nino finds that he has a lot in common with Alya and begins dating her.: The English version of this episode was first shown in Australia on 12 April 2016.
17	17	"Antibug"	Thomas Astruc	Sébastien Thibaudeau	31 January 2016	15 October 2016	124	0.96
Chloé is being harassed by something invisible, who happens to be Sabrina Raincomprix, her friend who she treats like a slave, akumatized into "Vanisher" after an argument. Chloé tries to help Ladybug de-akumatize Sabrina, but she is dismissed. Feeling betrayed by her idol, Chloé is akumatized into "Antibug", an opposite-colored Ladybug with a twisted version of the original's power to create Lucky Charms.: The English version of this episode was first shown in Australia on 21 April 2016.
18	18	"The Puppeteer" "La Marionnettiste"	Thomas Astruc	Sébastien Thibaudeau	7 February 2016	8 October 2016	118	0.99
Marinette and a girl she babysits, Manon Chamack, play with dolls of the heroes and some villains. Marinette allows Manon to take home one of the dolls, but Nadja, Manon's mother, forbids it. Manon convinces Marinette to lend her another doll, but it is confiscated. Angered, Manon becomes the "Puppeteer", who can control the people the dolls are based on.: The English version of the episode was first shown in Australia on 20 April 2016.
19	19	"Reflekta"	Thomas Astruc	Sophie Lodwitz; Eve Pisler	21 February 2016	1 October 2016	121	0.91
Marinette's classmate, goth girl Juleka Couffaine, is hesitant about being in the class photo, as she believes every photo taken of her will have her face obscured. Wanting to be closer to Adrien in the photo, Chloé has Juleka locked in the bathroom. Believing that she will always be unnoticed, she is akumatized into "Reflekta", a flamboyant villain who can make people look exactly like her.: The English version of this episode was first shown in Australia on 19 April 2016.
20	20	"Guitar Villain" "Guitar Vilain"	Thomas Astruc	Sébastien Thibaudeau	28 February 2016	3 September 2016	120	1.01
Jagged Stone, a rock musician, is having problems with his manager, Bob Roth, who wants him to change his style and duet with XY, a young EDM artist who replaced Jagged as the top musician on the charts. When XY insults Jagged, the latter is akumatized into "Guitar Villain", who can fire mind-controlling sound waves from his guitar and has a dragon, transformed from his crocodile Fang, as a sidekick.: The English version of this episode was first shown in Australia on 14 April 2016.
21	21	"Pixelator" "Numéric"	Thomas Astruc	Guillaume Mautalent; Sébastien Oursel	13 March 2016	27 August 2016	107	1.13
Marinette's class visits the Le Grand Paris hotel in order to try out some of the staff's jobs. When Jagged Stone checks in, he is followed by Vincent Aza, an obsessed fan; he attempts to take a picture but is kicked out. Shunned by his idol, Vincent is akumatized into "Pixelator", who can trap the people he takes pictures of in photographs that appear on his apartment wall.: This episode was first shown in Quebec, Canada on 3 March 2016.; This English version of the episode was first shown in Australia on 25 April 2016.
22	22	"Princess Fragrance" "Princesse Fragrance"	Thomas Astruc	Matthieu Choquet; Léonie De Rudder	20 March 2016	14 May 2016	104	1.11
Marinette's classmate, Rose Lavillant, writes a letter to Prince Ali of Achu in anticipation of his visit to Paris. She sprays perfume on it, which gets her kicked out of chemistry class; later, Chloé tears up the letter. Heartbroken, Rose is akumatized into "Princess Fragrance", whose perfume makes people serve her. Meanwhile, Tikki falls ill and Marinette takes her to a mysterious healer.: This episode was first shown in Quebec, Canada on 13 March 2016.; The English version of this episode was first shown in Australia on 22 April 2016.
23	23	"Simon Says" "Jackady"	Thomas Astruc	Fred Lenoir	27 March 2016	20 August 2016	110	0.86
On a game show, hypnotist Simon Grimault is tasked to hypnotize Gabriel. However, Gabriel refuses to participate, causing Simon to fail. Angry at not being allowed to even try, Simon is akumatized into "Simon Says", who can hypnotize people by throwing playing cards at them. During his attack, Ladybug learns about Adrien's mother, Emilie, who has gone missing.: This episode was first shown in Quebec, Canada on 6 March 2016.; The English version of this episode was first shown in Australia on 13 April 2016.
24	24	"Volpina"	Thomas Astruc	Matthieu Choquet; Léonie de Rudder	3 April 2016	22 October 2016	126	0.96
Adrien discovers a grimoire (and, unbeknownst to him, the Peacock Miraculous) in his father's safe; he steals the book to learn more. Lila Rossi, a new student, claims to be friends with Ladybug to win Adrien, and takes the book. Ladybug exposes Lila, allowing her to be akumatized into "Volpina", who can create realistic, intangible illusions, like the Mirage of a real Fox Miraculous user. After the battle, Marinette recovers the book, which Tikki recognizes as the long-lost spellbook that contains coded secrets about the Miraculouses and their holders. She then brings Marinette to meet a man she calls Master Fu.: This episode was first shown in Quebec, Canada on 19 March 2016.; The English version of the episode was first shown in Australia on 26 April 2016.
25	25	"Ladybug & Cat Noir – Origins, Part 1" "Ladybug et Chat Noir (Origines – Partie 1)"	Thomas Astruc	Thomas Astruc; Quentin; Sébastien Thibaudeau	30 October 2016	6 August 2016	122	0.97
A man uses the Butterfly Miraculous and its kwami Nooroo, becoming Hawk Moth in order to get the Ladybug and Cat Miraculouses and obtain absolute power. Master Fu is notified of this by the kwami of the Turtle Miraculous, Wayzz, and sets off to find new Miraculous holders, as he is 186 years old and could not fight himself. Meanwhile, on the first day of school, Kim mocks Ivan Bruel's crush on Mylène. Ivan becomes Hawk Moth's first victim, turning into "Stoneheart", a rock golem that grows with every hit. Ladybug and Cat Noir transform for the first time, and manage to defeat Stoneheart. However, Ladybug forgets to purify his akuma, and it flies off, multiplying and turning people into immobile Stonehearts. When Marinette sees this, she renounces her Miraculous.: This episode was first shown in South Korea on 1 March 2016 as episode 14.; The French version of this episode was first shown in Quebec, Canada on 4 March 2016 as episode 21.; The English version of this episode was first shown in Australia on 6 April 2016.
26	26	"Stoneheart – Origins, Part 2" "Cœur de pierre (Origines – Partie 2)"	Thomas Astruc	Thomas Astruc; Quentin; Sébastien Thibaudeau	30 October 2016	6 August 2016	123	0.97
Ivan accidentally scares Mylène with his singing. He is turned back into Stoneheart, and his duplicates come to life to serve as his personal army. Marinette tries to pass her Miraculous to Alya, but she is forced to transform back into Ladybug. Hawk Moth demands that Ladybug and Cat Noir surrender their Miraculous, but Ladybug refuses, causing Cat Noir to fall in love with her. That evening, after school, it's raining outside; Adrien shares his umbrella with Marinette, who falls in love with him.: This episode was first shown in Switzerland on RTS Deux on 2 March 2016.; The English version of this episode was first shown in Australia on 7 April 2016.
