= Take a Spin in the Air =

- Film poster
- Directed by: Cristián Sánchez Garfias
- Written by: Cristián Sánchez Garfias
- Produced by: Rodrigo Muñoz Galvez
- Starring: Rodrigo González Larrondo; Cristóbal Bascuñán; Diego Madrigal; Zacarías del Río; Ana María Zabala; Camila Leppe; José Ignacio Diez; Daniel Pérez
- Cinematography: Andrés Jordán
- Edited by: Cristián Sánchez Garfias; Diego Soto
- Production company: Nómada Producciones
- Release dates: 15 October 2020 (FICValdivia); 22 March 2021 (BAFICI); 29 June 2021 (VOD)
- Running time: 80 minutes
- Country: Chile
- Language: Spanish

Take a Spin in the Air (Spanish: Date una vuelta en el aire) is a 2020 Chilean surrealist fantasy comedy thriller film written and directed by Cristián Sánchez Garfias. Starring Rodrigo González Larrondo, Cristóbal Bascuñán, Diego Madrigal, Zacarías del Río, Ana María Zabala, Camila Leppe, José Ignacio Diez and Daniel Pérez. The film was named on the shortlist for Chilean's entry for the Academy Award for Best International Feature Film at the 94th Academy Awards, but it was not selected.

== Synopsis ==
A schoolboy who is brilliant in math but loves art, a fetish businessman who collects photos of girls, and an obsessive car cleaner who writes plays as a hobby are all drawn to the mansion of a cultural center. Where they meet a woman, who seems to act as a seer, who urges them to find a hundred-year-old tree planted on an ancient indigenous ceremonial center.

== Cast ==
- José Ignacio Diez
- Ana María Zabala
- Daniel Pérez
- Rodrigo González Larrondo
- Cristóbal Bascuñán
- Diego Madrigal
- Zacarías del Río
- Camila Leppe

== Release ==
It had its premiere in Chilean territory on October 15, 2020, at the 27th Valdivia International Film Festival, then it premiered in Argentine territory on March 22, 2021, at the Buenos Aires Independent Film Festival. It released on June 29, 2021, on the VOD platforms of the Cineteca Nacional and Red de Salas along with his other film The Promise of Return. It had its European premiere on September 27, 2021, at the 30th Biarritz Amérique Latine Festival.

== Accolades ==
Year	Award / Festival	Category	Recipient	Result	Ref.
2021	Buenos Aires Independent Film Festival	American Competition - Best Picture	Cristián Sánchez Garfias	Nominated	
2021	Biarritz Amérique Latine Festival	Fiction Feature Film Competition - Jury Award	Cristián Sánchez Garfias	Nominated	
