= The Promise of Return =

- Promotional release poster
- Directed by: Cristián Sánchez Garfias
- Written by: Cristián Sánchez Garfias
- Produced by: Cristián Sánchez Garfias
- Starring: Natalia Martínez; Manuel Hübner; José Ignacio Diez; Anderson Tudor; Beatriz Carillo; Rafael Jean François; Daniel Pérez
- Cinematography: Manuel Vlastelica
- Edited by: Cristián Sánchez Garfias; Diego Soto
- Production company: Nómada Producciones
- Release dates: October 15, 2020 (FICValdivia); March 22, 2021 (BAFICI); June 29, 2021 (VOD)
- Running time: 70 minutes
- Country: Chile
- Language: Spanish

The Promise of Return (Spanish: La promesa del retorno) is a 2020 Chilean fantasy mystery film written, directed and produced by Cristián Sánchez Garfias. Starring Natalia Martínez, Manuel Hübner, José Ignacio Diez, Anderson Tudor, Beatriz Carillo, Rafael Jean François and Daniel Pérez. The film was named on the shortlist for Chilean's entry for the Academy Award for Best International Feature Film at the 94th Academy Awards, but it was not selected.

== Synopsis ==
An art student dissatisfied with life feels a restlessness in her soul that prevents her from sleeping. One dawn she hears an eagle trumpeting that seems to herald abnormal weather, made clear by the discovery of a copy of The Immaculate Conception, the book by Paul Eluard and André Breton, in the incinerator of her apartment.

== Cast ==
The actors participating in this film are:

- Natalia Martínez
- Manuel Hübner
- José Ignacio Diez
- Anderson Tudor
- Beatriz Carillo
- Rafael Jean François
- Daniel Pérez

== Release ==
La promesa del retorno had its premiere in Chilean territory on October 15, 2020, at the 27th Valdivia International Film Festival, then it screened in Argentine territory on March 22, 2021, at the Buenos Aires Independent Film Festival. It released on June 29, 2021, on the VOD platforms of the Cineteca Nacional and Red de Salas along with his other film Take a Spin in the Air.

== Accolades ==
Year	Award / Festival	Category	Recipient	Result	Ref.
2021	Buenos Aires Independent Film Festival	American Competition - Best Picture	Cristián Sánchez Garfias	Nominated	
2021	Alternative Lima Festival	Iberoamerican Competition - Best Picture	Cristián Sánchez Garfias	Nominated	
