= A Fairy Tale After All =

2022 American musical fantasy film by Erik Peter Carlson

- Official release poster
- Directed by: Erik Peter Carlson
- Written by: Erik Peter Carlson
- Produced by: Erik Peter Carlson
- Starring: Emily Shenaut; Brian Hull; Gabriel Burrafato; Bridget Winder; Timothy N. Kopacz; Anna Brisbin
- Narrated by: Hayley Emin
- Cinematography: Hilarion Banks
- Edited by: Erik Peter Carlson
- Music by: Chelsi Hardcastle
- Production companies: A Fairy Tale After All Enterprises; Riding Hood Motion Pictures
- Distributed by: Vertical Entertainment; Premiere Entertainment Group
- Release date: February 18, 2022
- Running time: 72 minutes
- Country: United States
- Language: English

A Fairy Tale After All is a 2022 American musical fantasy film produced, written and directed by Erik Peter Carlson. The film stars Emily Shenaut, Brian Hull, Gabriel Burrafato, Bridget Winder, Timothy N. Kopacz, and Anna Brisbin. The film was released theatrical and VOD by Vertical Entertainment on February 18, 2022.

== Premise ==
A high school teenager named Sky (Emily Shenaut) is magically transported to the fairy tale kingdom of Celestia, where the villagers know her as Princess Geneva. She immediately finds herself on a daring journey to rescue her father, the King (Gabriel Burrafato), from the evil forces of Madame Mizrabel (Bridget Winder) and her slapstick sidekicks.

== Cast ==
- Brian Hull as Thumpkin (voice)
- Lucie Jones as Handmaiden (voice)
- Anna Brisbin as Gargantuan Squabby (voice)
- Gabriel Burrafato as Geneva's Father / The King
- Bridget Winder as Madame Mizrabel
- Amy Morse as Sky's Mother
- Emily Shenaut as Princess Geneva / Sky
- Tobin Cleary as Braxton
- Chelsi Hardcastle as Princess Geneva / Sky (singing voice)
- Timothy N. Kopacz as Cornelis
- Faye Giordano as Young Sky
- Hayley Emin as Narrator / Chickpea / Cassidy Lemon
- Sophier Dryer as Peasant Child
- Zachary Brown as Cubby (voice)
- Shane Carlson as Hoglet #1
- Charles Merrihew as The Shroud
- Phillip Nathaniel Freeman as Master Willow (voice)
- Kate Maloy as Ms. Murphy
- Robby Devillez as Hektor (voice)
- Dante Burrafato as Tree Boy
- Shadia Hrichi as Chickpea (human)

== Production ==
In June 2021, Premiere Entertainment Group announced they purchased Erik Peter Carlson's Labyrinth-inspired musical fantasy film A Fairy Tale After All, starring Emily Shenaut, Brian Hull, Gabriel Burrafato, Bridget Winder, Timothy N. Kopacz, and Anna Brisbin in lead roles. In July 2021, the production studios were revealed to be A Fairy Tale After All Enterprises and Riding Hood Motion Pictures. The film's music and lyrics were composed by Chelsi Hardcastle.

== Release ==
A Fairy Tale After All was released simultaneously in theaters and VOD by Vertical Entertainment on February 18, 2022.

=== Critical reception ===
Ferdosa Abdi of Screen Rant rated the film 3 out of 5, writing "The blend of animation, black and white cinematography, and other techniques express Sky's emotional journey and offer viewers a boundless adventure".
