= Brian Hull =

American voice actor and impressionist (born 1991)

- Hull in 2026
- Born: August 28, 1991 (age 35); Dallas, Texas, U.S.
- Education: Dallas Baptist University
- Occupations: Voice actor; impressionist; YouTuber

YouTube information
- Channel: Brian Hull
- Years active: 2014–present
- Subscribers: 2.3 million
- Views: 370.4 million
- Last updated: July 3, 2022
- Website: www.brianhull.co

Brian William Hull (born August 28, 1991) is an American voice actor, impressionist and YouTuber. As of July 2022, he has over 2.3 million subscribers and over 370 million views on YouTube.

Hull made his mainstream debut as a voice actor in the 2022 film Hotel Transylvania: Transformania.

== Early life ==
Hull is a graduate of the Dallas Baptist University, with a vocal performance degree.

== Career ==
In a February 2022 interview, Hull said that he started making YouTube videos in 2009. In March 2014, Hull recorded a cover of the popular song "Let It Go", from the 2013 Disney film Frozen, while impersonating various Disney characters such as Winnie the Pooh, Tigger, Mickey Mouse, Minnie Mouse and Goofy. The cover was for a contest to win a $100 gift card to shop at any Disney Store. In May 2016, Hull recorded a cover of Adele's "Hello" while impersonating various Disney and Pixar characters.

In October 2019, Hull voiced a young Sideburns Stabbington (in place of his usual voice actor Ron Perlman) in the season 3 episode of Rapunzel's Tangled Adventure, "No Time Like the Past".

Over seven years into his YouTube career, Hull landed his first wide release film role as Count "Drac" Dracula in the monster comedy sequel Hotel Transylvania: Transformania, after voicing the character in the short film Monster Pets. He replaced Adam Sandler, who voiced the character in the first three films of the franchise.

In June 2021, Hull was revealed to have voiced Thumpkin in the Vertical Entertainment fantasy film A Fairy Tale After All. In 2022, he starred as Guy Hilton in the animated film Marmaduke, based on the comic strip of the same name.

By January 2025, he voiced three characters in the steampunk streaming series MechWest. (Note: Hull, Brian [@BrianHullsVoice] (January 25, 2025). "Y'all Big Announcement!! Y'all may have seen the indie show Mech West on YouTube, I can now share I will be playing 2 characters in Episode 3!! They jut released episode 2, go check it out, this series is AMAZING!!" (Tweet) – via X (formerly Twitter).)

== Filmography ==
=== Film ===
Year	Title	Role	Notes
2016	Rescue Dogs	Nightmare	Direct-to-DVD
2016	Pup Star	Murray	Direct-to-DVD
2017	Pup Star: Better 2Gether	James Corgie	Direct-to-DVD
2018	Pup Star: World Tour	Jimmy Kibble / Canine West	Direct-to-DVD
2018	Puppy Star Christmas	Blitzen	Direct-to-DVD
2021	Monster Pets	Count "Drac" Dracula	Short film
2022	Hotel Transylvania: Transformania	Count "Drac" Dracula	
2022	A Fairy Tale After All	Thumpkin	
2022	Marmaduke	Guy Hilton	

=== Video games ===
Year	Title	Role	Notes
2016	World War Toons	Various voices	
2017	World War Toons: Tank Up!	Snake Guy	

=== Television ===
Year	Title	Role	Notes
2019	Rapunzel's Tangled Adventure	Young Sideburns Stabbington (voice)	Episode: "No Time Like the Past"
2025	City the Animation	Mr. Adatara, Ryōta Adatara, Hotaka, Yamato Kurogane	English voices

=== Web series ===
Year	Title	Role	Notes
2025	MechWest	Ida Waxman / Timothy Waxman / Krab	Episode: "Centureno"
