= Cristián Sánchez (director) =

Chilean film director, writer and teacher

- Occupation: Film director

Luis Cristián Sánchez Garfias (born 19 June 1951) is a Chilean film director, writer and teacher. He is best known as one of the few who actively made underground film inside the repressive Pinochet regime and is a self-proclaimed adherent of the Poetics of Cinema of Raúl Ruiz whom he studied under at the Universidad Católica in the early 1970s and wrote a book about in 2011. His films El zapato chino (1979) and Los deseos concebidos (1982) were both shown at the Berlinale in 1983 and both figure in cinechile.cl's 2016 greatest Chilean films of all-time list.

== Select filmography ==
- Vías paralelas (1975)
- El zapato chino (1979)
- Los deseos concebidos (1982)
- El otro round (1984)
- El cumplimiento del deseo (1994)
- Cuídate del agua Mansa (1995)
- Cautiverio feliz (1998)
- Camino de sangre (2003)
- Tiempos malos (2008)
- La promesa del retorno (2020)
- Date una vuelta en el aire (2020)

== Bibliography ==
- Cristián Sánchez Garfias (2011). Aventura del cuerpo: El pensamiento cinematográfico de Raúl Ruiz. Ocho Libros Editores. ISBN 9789563350494.
