= Anna Brisbin =

American YouTuber and voice actress

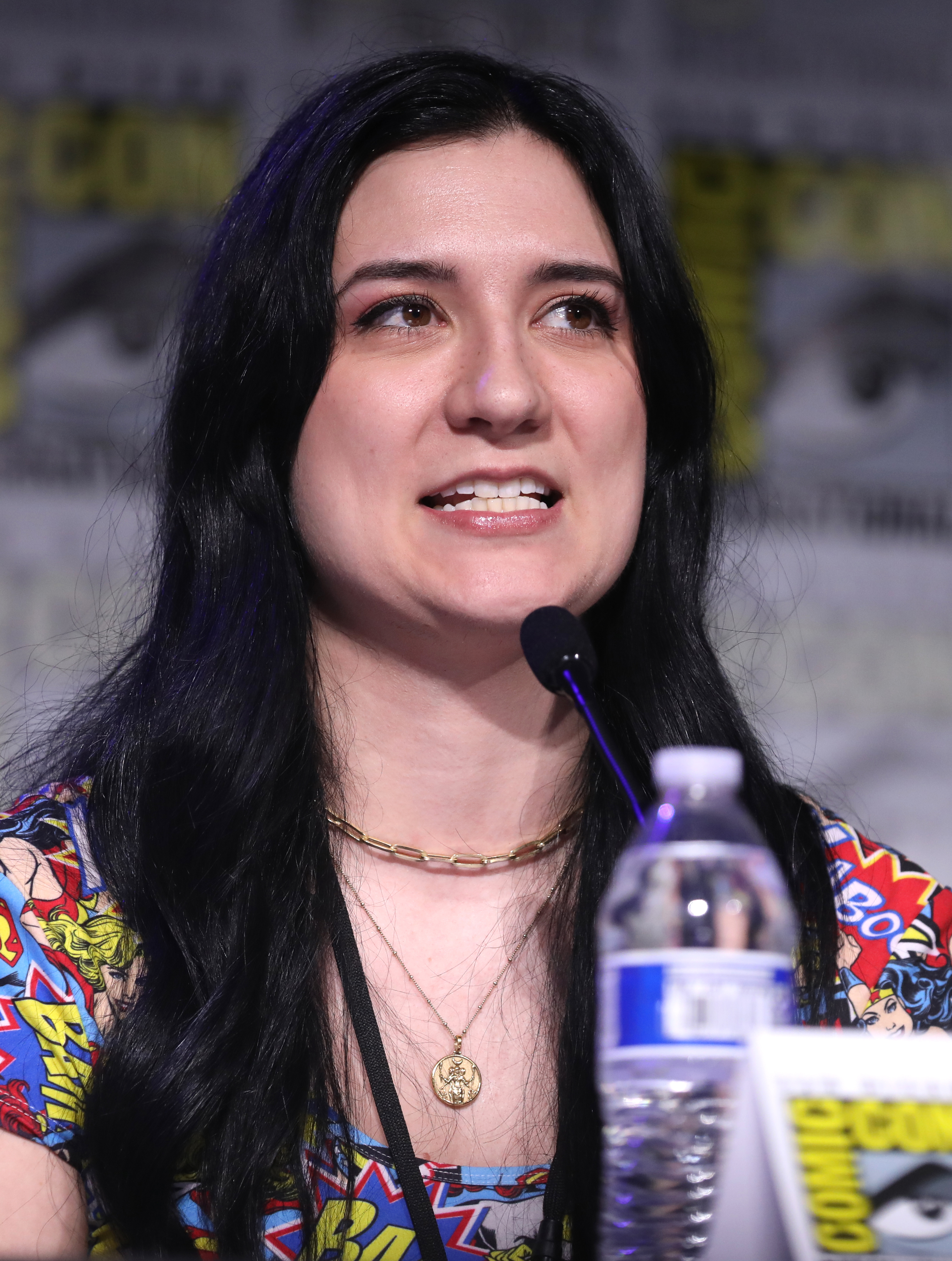
- Brisbin at San Diego Comic-Con in July 2023
- Education: Tisch School of the Arts
- Occupations: YouTuber; voice actress
- Years active: 2012–present

YouTube information
- Channel: Brizzy Voices

Anna Brisbin is an American YouTuber and voice actress known for her YouTube channel Brizzy Voices. She is known for her voice impressions of fictional characters, such as Harry Potter, Pokémon and the Disney Princesses, as well as Disney characters in general.

== Early life ==
Brisbin grew up in South Carolina. Her father Lehr Brisbin is a biologist and ecologist who previously worked with the Savannah River Ecology Lab. She attended the Tisch School of the Arts at New York University, where she majored in drama and completed the Stonestreet Studios acting program.

== Career ==
In 2015, she co-narrated the novel A Tale of Two Besties, written by HelloGiggles co-founder Sophia Rossi. She had a voice acting role in a 2016 web series adaptation of the popular video game Happy Wheels, in which she played Janet (the Effective Shopper). In 2017, her voiceover challenge series Voice It! debuted on Facebook Watch. With fellow YouTuber Tessa Netting, she is the co-host of the podcast Fantastic Geeks and Where to Find Them, which was launched in 2018. The podcast focuses on fandom culture and various geeky topics, catering to audiences passionate about pop culture and fandoms. "Fantastic Geeks" has gained popularity across multiple platforms, including Apple Podcasts and Spotify.

Brizzy Voices was shortlisted for the Artisan Award at the 2017 Summer in the City Awards, but lost to Jamie Jo. In June 2021, Brisbin was revealed to have voiced Gargantuan Squabby in the Vertical Entertainment fantasy film A Fairy Tale After All.

== Personal life ==
Brisbin identifies as bisexual.

== Filmography ==
Film

Year	Title	Role	Notes
2014	I Am Nightmare	Fran / Marie / Shy / Tenee / Tub (voices)	Credited as Brizzy Voices
2014	The Passing	Medium	Short film
2014	Murphy's Law	Wendy	Short film
2015	Tenured	Heather	
2015	Call to Heroes	Stacey Watson	Short film
2015	Huevos: Little Rooster's Egg-cellent Adventure	Grandma (voice)	
2016	Severus Snape and the Marauders	Rowena Ravenclaw	Short film
2016	Star Wars: Echoes of the Past	Rey (voice)	Short film
2017	R Rated Frozen	Anna (voice)	Short film
2017	Pixey	Princess Pixey (voice)	Short film
2017	Dreamstone	Heidi	Short film
2018	R Rated Mary Poppins	Mary Poppins (voice)	Short film
2018	Spooky Games!	Anna	Short film
2018	Shrek Retold	Princess Fiona (voice)	
2019	Kazumi Racecar Pig	Kazumi (voice)	Short film
2020	Ex Gratia	Node	Short film
2021	CausePlay IRL: St Jude X Fortnite	Zoey	Short film
2022	A Fairy Tale After All	Gargantuan Squabby (voice)	

Television

Year	Title	Role	Notes
2013	Brimstone Terrace	April (voice)	Episode: "Pilot"
2013	A Snow Globe Christmas	Waitress	Television film
2015–2016	Laurie the Lousy Fairy	Esther / Mom (voices)	2 episodes
2016	Sanders Shorts	Crush	2 episodes
2016	Inside the Extras Studio	Brizzy Voices	Episode: "Brizzy Voices Hates Gingers"
2016	Crash Zoom	Wingy Wendy (voice)	Episode: "Sky Scam"
2016–2017	Valet	Anna	8 episodes
2017	Power Hour	Lady Melisandre	Episode: "Lady Melisandre"
2017	Alex Clark: Animated Storytimes	Baby (voice)	Episode: "2 Bikinis, 1 Elevator, And Me"
2017	Hyperlinked	Ice Cream Girl	Episode: "Ticket Giveaway"
2018	The 5th Quarter	Leena	Episode: "The Dark Horse"
2020	Digital Sky	Narrator / Lisa Nino	Main role
2020	Bijuu Mike	Brizzy Voices	2 episodes
2016–2021	How It Should Have Ended	Harley Quinn (voice), Dory (voice)	3 episodes for Harley Quinn, 1 episode for Dory
2025	Um, Actually	Herself	Episode: "Delicious in Dungeon, X-Men '97, Fallout"

Video games

Year	Title	Role	Notes	Source
2017	Paradigm	Water Heater / Apathetic Retail Cashier Octopus / Grandma Insurance Ad / Phone Message (voices)		
2017	Final Fantasy XV: Monster of the Deep	Weather Forecaster (voice)		
2018	Monster Prom	Dahlia / Bellanda (voices)		
2019	Monster Prom: Second Term	Dahlia / Bellanda (voices)	Credited as Brizzy	
2019	River City Girls	Kumiko (voice)		
2019	Indivisble	Nijone / Yaksini Sisters (voices)		
2020	Final Fantasy VII Remake	Katie (voice)		
2020	Exos Heroes	Chati / Karin (voices)		
2020	Popup Dungeon	Claire / Owlice / Untombed Raider (voices)		
2020	Monster Prom 2: Monster Camp	Dahlia (voice)		
2021	Fallout 76: Steel Reign	Cassie Halloway (voice)		
2022	God of War: Ragnarök	Einherjar (voice)		
2022	Bayonetta 3	Viola (voice)		
2023	Immortals of Aveum	Kenzie		
2024	Guilty Gear Strive	A.B.A		
2025	Cookie Run Kingdom	Pavlova Cookie		
2025	Yakuza 0 Director's Cut	Additional voices		
