= Miraculous: Tales of Ladybug & Cat Noir season 2 =

Miraculous: Tales of Ladybug & Cat Noir
- Season 2
- Promotional poster
- No. of episodes: 26

Release
- Original release: December 11, 2016 – November 18, 2018

Season chronology
- ← Previous; Season 1 Next → Season 3

The second season of Miraculous: Tales of Ladybug & Cat Noir which aired in France from 11 December 2016 to 18 November 2018, totaling 26 episodes.

This season follows Marinette Dupain-Cheng and Adrien Agreste as Ladybug and Cat Noir respectively, as they fight akumatized villains created by Hawk Moth.

== Episodes ==
No. overall	No. in season	English title French title	Directed by	Written by	Original air date (France)	U.S. release date	Prod. code
27	1	"A Christmas Special / Santa Claws" "Pire Noël"	Thomas Astruc	Story by : Jeremy Zag; Teleplay by : Thomas Astruc, Fred Lenoir & Sébastien Thibaudeau	11 December 2016	20 December 2016	226
It is Adrien's first Christmas without his mother. With his father seemingly unwilling to celebrate, Adrien runs away. Hearing the news, Marinette transforms into Ladybug and finds Adrien in the company of a Santa. Thinking he is akumatized, she pushes him away. Scorned, the Santa actually becomes a villain named "Santa Claws", (Note: In the Christmas special, Santa, or Père Noël (lit. Father Christmas) is akumatized into Pire Noël (lit. "worst Christmas").) who wishes to ruin the holidays.
28	2	"The Collector" "Le Collectionneur"	Thomas Astruc; Wilfried Pain	Thomas Astruc; Matthieu Choquet; Fred Lenoir; Sébastien Thibaudeau	26 October 2017	30 March 2018	201
Marinette discovers Master Fu is Tikki's healer and the last Guardian of the Miraculouses. Fu confirms the grimoire's nature and suspects its owner could be Hawk Moth; Marinette first believes it is Adrien, but her suspicions fall on Gabriel. Noticing the book's loss, Hawk Moth – who is in fact Gabriel – akumatizes himself into "The Collector", who can trap anything in his sketchbook, to cover his tracks. Ladybug and Cat Noir defeat him, concluding he cannot be Hawk Moth. Fu creates a copy of the book and Marinette returns it to Gabriel, who reveals he got it in Tibet from his wife. Nathalie is also revealed to be Hawk Moth's willing accomplice.: This episode first premiered in Spain on Disney Channel on 21 October 2017, with an English version made available on secondary audio before debuting on Disney Channel in the UK and Ireland on 4 November 2017.
29	3	"Despair Bear" "Doudou Vilain"	Thomas Astruc; Jun Violet	Thomas Astruc; Matthieu Choquet; Fred Lenoir; Nolwenn Pierre; Sébastien Thibaudeau	27 October 2017	30 March 2018	204
Chloé sets off a false fire alarm at school, leading to every student but herself being punished. Adrien scolds her and tells her to be nice to others. Her butler, Jean, has her host a party; during the celebration, he encourages her with her old teddy bear, Mr. Cuddly. When the toy is accidentally revealed, Chloé fires Jean. Feeling vengeful, Jean becomes "Despair Bear", who controls Mr. Cuddly from the inside and can mind-control anyone he touches.: This episode first premiered in Spain on Disney Channel on 21 October 2017, with an English version made available on secondary audio before debuting on Disney Channel in the UK and Ireland on 11 November 2017.
30	4	"Prime Queen" "Audimatrix"	Thomas Astruc; Christelle Abgrall	Thomas Astruc; Matthieu Choquet; Fred Lenoir; Sébastien Thibaudeau	29 October 2017	30 March 2018	202
Nadja Chamack hosts a new talk show, with Ladybug and Cat Noir as her first guests. To boost her ratings, she talks about the heroes' relationship, which drives them to leave. With her show now cancelled, Nadja becomes "Prime Queen", who can teleport between digital screens.: This episode first premiered in Portugal on Disney Channel on 25 October 2017, with an English version made available on secondary audio before debuting on Disney Channel in the UK and Ireland on 18 November 2017.
31	5	"Befana" "La Béfana"	Thomas Astruc; Benoît Boucher	Thomas Astruc; Mélanie Duval; Sébastien Thibaudeau	30 October 2017	30 March 2018	208
It is Marinette's birthday and Tikki gives her a necklace called a "kwagatama" as a gift. Her paternal grandmother Gina Dupain also visits, but Marinette leaves her to join a surprise party. Unable to understand why, Gina feels rejected. She is akumatized into "Befana", a villain with a flying motorcycle and the ability to turn people into coal statues or fairy servants.: The English version of this episode was first shown on Disney Channel in the UK and Ireland on 25 November 2017.
32	6	"Riposte"	Thomas Astruc; Jun Violet	Thomas Astruc; Matthieu Choquet; Fred Lenoir; Sébastien Thibaudeau	1 November 2017	30 March 2018	207
A new student, Kagami Tsurugi, attempts to join Collège François Dupont's fencing team and has a duel with Adrien. An unsure Marinette is made the referee and declares Adrien the winner. Disappointed in her failure, Kagami is akumatized into "Riposte", who can slice anything with a saber attached to her arm. After Riposte's defeat, Kagami and Adrien agree to be friends.: The English version of this episode was first shown on Disney Channel in the UK and Ireland on 2 December 2017.
33	7	"Robostus"	Thomas Astruc; Wilfried Pain	Thomas Astruc; Matthieu Choquet; Fred Lenoir; Sébastien Thibaudeau	3 November 2017	30 March 2018	211
A computer virus threatens the school's servers, but Markov, Max's pet robot who can feel real emotions, stops it. However, Principal Damocles believes he is only a toy, and confiscates him. Separated from his friend and creator, Markov is akumatized into "Robostus", who can bring technological devices to life. When he learns of the Miraculous' ability to grant wishes, he betrays Hawk Moth. After the battle, Master Fu explains the Ladybug and Cat Miraculouses together can grant a wish, but with an equal price in return.: The English version of this episode was first shown on Disney Channel in the UK and Ireland on 9 December 2017.
34	8	"Gigantitan"	Thomas Astruc; Christelle Abgrall	Thomas Astruc; Matthieu Choquet; Fred Lenoir; Sébastien Thibaudeau	26 November 2017	30 March 2018	206
Marinette and her friends come up with a convoluted plan to propose to Adrien. However, it goes awry, and Adrien's bodyguard, the "Gorilla", almost becomes akumatized. He manages to calm down, but the akuma instead transforms a tantrum-throwing baby, August, into "Gigantitan", a giant baby who desperately wants a lollipop.
35	9	"The Dark Owl" "Le Hibou Noir"	Thomas Astruc; Jun Violet	Thomas Astruc; Matthieu Choquet; Fred Lenoir; Sébastien Thibaudeau	10 December 2017	30 March 2018	213
Mr. Damocles starts roleplaying as a vigilante hero named "The Owl". However, his heroic efforts continuously fail, and soon his secret identity is exposed. Humiliated by the public, Mr. Damocles is akumatized into the "Dark Owl", who has real superhero gadgets. He manages to trap Ladybug and Cat Noir in a container where they will drown unless they surrender their Miraculouses. They manage to trick him, and in the process Tikki and Plagg learn their secret identities. After Dark Owl's defeat, Ladybug and Cat Noir help Mr. Damocles be a superhero on a smaller scale by doing good deeds.: Cameo: Jun Violet as face of akumatized version of Mr. Damocles' computer named Albert.; This episode first premiered in Spain on 5 December 2017.
36	10	"Glaciator"	Thomas Astruc; Wilfried Pain	Thomas Astruc; Matthieu Choquet; Fred Lenoir; Sébastien Thibaudeau	14 January 2018	30 March 2018	203
Marinette and her friends visit André, an ice cream maker whose ice cream is said to make people fall in love. Marinette hopes Adrien will be there, but instead he prepares a candlelight dinner for Ladybug as Cat Noir. Marinette refuses to eat her ice cream, making André depressed. He is akumatized into "Glaciator", who can turn people into ice cream statues that can melt. After the battle, Cat Noir confesses his love for Ladybug, who turns him down.: This episode was scheduled to premiere on TFOU on 17 December 2017, but it did not air due to production issues.
37	11	"Sapotis"	Thomas Astruc; Jun Violet	Thomas Astruc; Matthieu Choquet; Fred Lenoir; Sébastien Thibaudeau	21 January 2018	30 March 2018	212
Marinette helps Alya babysit the latter's twin sisters, Ella and Etta. When they keep causing mischief, Alya threatens to cancel their amusement park trip. The angered twins are transformed into the "Sapotis", gremlins that multiply when they eat. Overwhelmed by the creatures, Ladybug visits Master Fu, who loans her the Fox Miraculous. She gives it to Alya, who, with the command of Trixx the kwami, transforms into "Rena Rouge". After the Sapotis are defeated, Alya reluctantly returns the Miraculous. The new superhero makes Hawk Moth realize that the Guardian and his Miraculouses are in Paris.: Cameo: Wilfried "Winny" Pain as voice of some Sapotis.
38	12	"Gorizilla"	Thomas Astruc; Benoît Boucher	Thomas Astruc; Matthieu Choquet; Mélanie Duval; Sébastien Thibaudeau	13 May 2018	30 March 2018	210
Adrien sneaks out to watch a movie his mother starred in, but gets mobbed by a group of fans. Gabriel suspects his son may be Cat Noir, and sends Adrien's bodyguard to find him. When he fails, Gabriel akumatizes the bodyguard into "Gorizilla", a giant gorilla with a keen sense of smell. Ladybug and Cat Noir defeat him, and Cat Noir throws Gabriel's suspicions off with the help of a fan named Wayhem.: This episode first premiered in Canada on Family Channel on 14 March 2018.
39	13	"Captain Hardrock" "Capitaine Hardrock"	Thomas Astruc; Wilfried Pain	Thomas Astruc; Fred Lenoir; Jean-Remi Perrin; Sébastien Thibaudeau	20 May 2018	30 March 2018	216
It is the Paris' music festival and Marinette and her friends help set up the Couffaines' houseboat for a concert. Marinette meets Luka, Juleka's brother, and feels attracted to him. The police find the houseboat's setup too loud, so they disqualify Juleka's mother, Anarka. Angered, she is akumatized into "Captain Hardrock", a pirate who wants to ruin all the concerts.
40	14	"Zombizou"	Thomas Astruc; Wilfried Pain	Thomas Astruc; Wilfried Pain	27 May 2018	14 December 2018	215
Marinette's teacher, Ms. Caline Bustier, is having her birthday, and all her students have gifts for her, except for Chloé. After being called out for it, Chloé messes up Marinette's gift. Marinette almost becomes a target for Hawk Moth, but Ms. Bustier intercepts the akuma and becomes "Zombizou", whose kiss turns anyone into kissing zombies.: This episode first premiered in Canada on Family Channel on 13 April 2018.
41	15	"Syren"	Thomas Astruc; Benoît Boucher	Thomas Astruc; Mélanie Duval; Fred Lenoir; Sébastien Thibaudeau	3 June 2018	14 December 2018	214
Ondine, a talented swimmer, tries to ask out Kim, but he leaves to see a movie with his other friends. Brokenhearted, Ondine is akumatized into "Syren", a mermaid who floods the city. Meanwhile, Adrien doubts being a superhero, but he and Master Fu meet, changing his mind. Master Fu creates an "aqua" potion that allows Ladybug and Cat Noir to defeat Syren.: This episode was originally supposed to air on 21 April 2018 in the UK, but was rescheduled to 12 May 2018.; This episode premiered in Spain on Disney Channel on 5 May 2018, with an English version made available on secondary audio.
42	16	"Frightningale" "Rossignoble"	Thomas Astruc; Christelle Abgrall; Jeremy Paoletti	Thomas Astruc; Matthieu Choquet; Fred Lenoir; Sébastien Thibaudeau	10 June 2018	27 September 2018 (KidsClick) 14 December 2018 (Netflix)	209
Clara Nightingale, a famous singer, is in France to film a music video about Ladybug and Cat Noir. She casts Marinette and Adrien as their superhero personas, but Marinette rejects the offer to protect her secret identity. However, she auditions again when Chloé wishes to be cast. Chloé ends up being excluded, so she has her father ban Clara. Saddened, she is akumatized into "Frightningale", who can turn people into statues if they do not sing, dance, or speak in rhymes.: This episode first premiered in Spain on Disney Channel on 12 May 2018 with an English version made available on secondary audio.
43	17	"Troublemaker" "L'insaisissable"	Thomas Astruc; Wilfried Pain	Thomas Astruc; Matthieu Choquet; Fred Lenoir; Nolwenn Pierre; Sébastien Thibaudeau	17 June 2018	13 September 2018 (KidsClick) 14 December 2018 (Netflix)	205
Jagged Stone guest stars on a television show where a contestant does another person's job. Wanting to impress him, his agent Penny Rolling overexerts herself and has a nervous breakdown. Pressured, Penny becomes "Troublemaker", who can switch between being tangible and intangible.: This episode first premiered in Spain on Disney Channel on 16 June 2018, with an English version made available on secondary audio. It also premiered in Portugal on Disney Channel.
44	18	"Anansi"	Thomas Astruc; Benoît Boucher	Thomas Astruc; Mélanie Duval; Fred Lenoir; Sébastien Thibaudeau	23 September 2018	14 December 2018	221
Alya wants to see a fireworks show, but her older sister, Nora, insists it is dangerous due to the akumas. Nora offers to let her go if Nino can defeat her in arm-wrestling, and Marinette cheats to secure a victory. Underappreciated, Nora becomes "Anansi", a spider-themed villain, and traps Alya and Cat Noir at the Arc de Triomphe. Ladybug goes to Master Fu and gets the Turtle Miraculous for Nino, turning him into "Carapace", with the power to create protective "Shell-ters".: This episode first premiered in Canada on Family Channel on 10 September 2018.
45	19	"Sandboy" "Le Marchand de Sable"	Thomas Astruc; Jun Violet	Thomas Astruc; Mélanie Duval; Fred Lenoir; Sébastien Thibaudeau	30 September 2018	14 December 2018	223
It's Nooroo's cycle, or birthday, and Tikki and Plagg join all the other kwamis to try and contact him. While they are gone, the heroes are attacked by "Sandboy", who can bring nightmares to life. The kwamis end up calling Hawk Moth, so Tikki and Plagg return to their holders. They defeat Sandboy, who happens to be a boy (never named) who had a nightmare.: This episode first premiered in Canada on Family Channel on 24 September 2018.
46	20	"Reverser" "Inverso"	Thomas Astruc; Benoît Boucher	Thomas Astruc & Fred Lenoir	7 October 2018	14 December 2018	220
Marc Anciel, a shy writer, drops a fictional journal of Ladybug. It inspires Nathaniel, so Marinette sets up a meeting with him and Marc. However, Nathaniel mistakes it for a prank, and leaves. Marc is akumatized into "Reverser", who can reverse any personality trait of his choice. After his defeat, Marc and Nathaniel make amends and work on a comic together.: This episode was first broadcast in Canada on Family Channel on 23 July 2018.
47	21	"Frozer" "Le Patineur"	Thomas Astruc; Jeremy Paoletti	Thomas Astruc; Mélanie Duval; Fred Lenoir; Sébastien Thibaudeau	14 October 2018	14 December 2018	217
Marinette, Luka, Adrien, and Kagami go on an ice-skating double date. However, Mayor Bourgeois wants to close the ice rink, as the skating coach, Philippe, has not had a student for a year. When he is unable to convince the four to sign up for lessons, he is akumatized into "Frozer", who turns Paris into ice. Using a new potion from Master Fu, Ladybug and Cat Noir defeat Frozer.: Guest star: Philippe Candeloro as Philippe / Frozer in the French version.; This episode first premiered in Brazil on Gloob on 12 October 2018.; The French version was first shown in Switzerland on RTS Deux on 13 October 2018.
48	22	"Style Queen (Queen's battle – Part 1)" "Style Queen (Le combat des Reines – Partie 1)"	Thomas Astruc; Jun Violet	Thomas Astruc; Matthieu Choquet; Fred Lenoir; Sébastien Thibaudeau	21 October 2018	14 December 2018	218
Audrey Bourgeois, Chloé's emotionally abusive mother, attends a fashion show at the Grand Palais. Gabriel, staying in his mansion's basement where Emilie's coffin is kept, deliberately enrages Audrey in order to akumatize her into "Style Queen", a being made of glitter that can turn anyone into a golden statue. She disables Adrien, so Ladybug grabs the Bee Miraculous with the power of Venom that paralyzes people, but it is lost in the battle. Chloé later finds the Miraculous and meets its kwami, Pollen.: This episode first premiered in Spain on Disney Channel on 6 October 2018, with an English version made available on secondary audio. It also premiered in Portugal on Disney Channel.; The French version was first shown in Switzerland on RTS Deux on 13 October 2018.
49	23	"Queen Wasp (Queen's battle – Part 2)" "Queen Wasp (Le combat des Reines – Partie 2)"	Thomas Astruc; Wilfried Pain	Thomas Astruc; Matthieu Choquet; Fred Lenoir; Sébastien Thibaudeau	21 October 2018	14 December 2018	219
Audrey offers to take Marinette to New York, making Chloé feel left out. She publicly uses the Bee Miraculous to transform into "Queen Bee", then engineers a situation to make herself seem like a hero. After being scolded by Ladybug and Cat Noir, Chloé feels more unwanted. She is akumatized into "Queen Wasp", who controls a swarm of wasps that paralyze people, but Ladybug and Cat Noir convince her to give the Miraculous back. Marinette turns down Audrey's offer, and Audrey decides to stay in Paris.: This episode first premiered in Spain on Disney Channel on 6 October 2018, with an English version made available on secondary audio. It also premiered in Portugal on Disney Channel.; The French version was first shown in Switzerland on RTS Deux on 14 October 2018.
50	24	"Malediktator" "Maledikteur"	Thomas Astruc; Benoît Boucher	Thomas Astruc; Matthieu Choquet; Fred Lenoir; Sébastien Thibaudeau	28 October 2018	14 December 2018	222
Chloé shows a documentary of Queen Bee to her class, but her class mocks her. Enraged, Chloé demands that her father punish the students, but he refuses. Chloé and Audrey threaten to move to New York. Unable to make his family happy, André is akumatized into "Malediktator", who can force people into obeying his every command. Ladybug tracks down Chloé, who admits she is having a crisis of self-esteem, and gives her back the Bee Miraculous. They defeat Malediktator, and Chloé decides not to leave after all.: This episode first premiered in Canada on Family Channel on 12 October 2018.; The French version was first shown in Switzerland on RTS Deux on 14 October 2018.
51	25	"Catalyst (Heroes' Day – Part 1)" "Catalyste (Le jour des Héros – partie 1)"	Thomas Astruc; Jun Violet; Jeremy Paoletti	Thomas Astruc; Matthieu Choquet; Mélanie Duval; Fred Lenoir; Sébastien Thibaudeau	18 November 2018	14 December 2018	224
It is Heroes' Day, the anniversary of heroic activities. For a particularly insidious plan, Gabriel deliberately frustrates Lila, who is now a shut-in, in order to turn her back into Volpina. She creates an illusion of an akumatized Ladybug destroying Cat Noir in order to make the Parisians vulnerable. Gabriel then turns Nathalie into "Catalyst", who can boost powers. She upgrades Hawk Moth into "Scarlet Moth", who can create as many akumas as he wants. Overwhelmed by the reappearance of several previous villains, Ladybug and Cat Noir recruit Rena Rouge, Carapace, and Queen Bee, outing the former two to each other. The five heroes meet on a lookout to think of a strategy.: This episode first premiered in Switzerland on RTS Deux on 21 October 2018.; The English version was first shown in Portugal on Disney Channel on 16 November 2018.
52	26	"Mayura (Heroes' Day – Part 2)" "Mayura (Le jour des Héros – partie 2)"	Thomas Astruc; Benoît Boucher; Jun Violet	Thomas Astruc; Matthieu Choquet; Mélanie Duval; Fred Lenoir; Sébastien Thibaudeau	18 November 2018	14 December 2018	225
The superheroes battle the so-called "Scarlet Army", but the villains prove too overwhelming. Scarlet Moth manages to akumatize Rena Rouge, Carapace, and Queen Bee, into "Rena Rage", "Shell Shock" and "Queen Wasp". Ladybug and Cat Noir are forced to retreat. Later, they manage to remove Catalyst's gift and reverse all the akumatizations. With Hawk Moth cornered, Catalyst takes the Peacock Miraculous and becomes "Mayura". She "amokizes" Hawk Moth, using an "amok", an evil feather, to create a "sentimonster". Born of Hawk Moth's frustration, the monstrous moth allows Hawk Moth to escape. Later, Gabriel warns Nathalie that the Peacock Miraculous is damaged and she should not use it again.: Guest star: Philippe Candeloro as Philippe in the French version.; This episode first premiered in Switzerland on RTS Deux on 3 November 2018.; The English version was first shown in Portugal on Disney Channel on 16 November 2018.
