= Wicked: For Good (score) =

Wicked: For Good – The Original Motion Picture Score

Film score by John Powell and Stephen Schwartz
- Released: December 5, 2025
- Recorded: 2025
- Studios: Abbey Road Studios; AIR Studios; Sony Scoring Stage
- Genre: Film score
- Length: 84:19
- Labels: Republic; Verve

Wicked chronology
Wicked: For Good – The Soundtrack (2025)	Wicked: For Good – The Original Motion Picture Score (2025)

John Powell chronology
How to Train Your Dragon (Original Motion Picture Soundtrack) (2025)	Wicked: For Good – The Original Motion Picture Score (2025)	Minions & Monsters (2026)

Stephen Schwartz chronology
Wicked: The Original Motion Picture Score (2024)	Wicked: For Good – The Original Motion Picture Score (2025)

Singles from Wicked: For Good – The Original Motion Picture Score
- 1. "A Wicked Good Finale" Released: November 24, 2025

Wicked: For Good – The Original Motion Picture Score is the film score composed by John Powell and Stephen Schwartz for the 2025 film Wicked: For Good by Jon M. Chu, which is based on the second act of the stage musical Wicked by Schwartz and Winnie Holzman. It was released by Republic Records on December 5, 2025. The score accompanies the film's musical and dramatic sequences.

== Production ==
On July 8, 2024, it was announced that John Powell would be scoring the film with Stephen Schwartz, who had composed the music for the original stage musical. It was recorded at AIR Studios and Abbey Road Studios in London.

== Release ==
The score album was released on December 5, 2025 in several formats, including digital download, streaming, and LP. It became available for pre-saving on November 17, 2025. "A Wicked Good Finale", featuring Ariana Grande and Cynthia Erivo, was released ahead of the album on November 24.

== Accolades ==
Wicked: For Good – The Original Motion Picture Score awards and nominations
Award	Year (Note: Indicates the year of ceremony. Each year is linked to the article about the awards held that year, wherever possible.)	Category	Recipients	Result	Ref.
Hollywood Music in Media Awards	2025	Score – Feature Film	John Powell and Stephen Schwartz	Nominated	
Society of Composers & Lyricists	2026	Outstanding Original Score for a Studio Film	John Powell and Stephen Schwartz	Nominated	

== Track listing ==
Wicked: For Good – The Original Motion Picture Score track listing
No.	Title	Length
1.	"Building a Golden Road"	3:03
2.	"Bubbles and Rainbows"	5:18
3.	"Backstage Confrontation"	2:14
4.	"Lies in the Sky"	1:36
5.	"Forest Furnishing"	2:21
6.	"Governor Nessarose's Petty Proclamations"	4:32
7.	"Oz Is Lost"	1:27
8.	"Sisterly Reunion"	2:21
9.	"All Around the Wicked Witch of the East"	5:15
10.	"Tin Woodman"	2:17
11.	"Wedding Preparations"	3:16
12.	"A Model Wizard"	2:18
13.	"Monkey Freedom"	3:54
14.	"Popular Wedding Music"	1:39
15.	"Cages, Chaos and Cake"	2:57
16.	"Lust and Betrayal"	6:37
17.	"Cyclones and Premonitions"	3:30
18.	"Requiem for a Witch"	3:18
19.	"Witches Get Snitches"	3:25
20.	"Getting What You Wanted"	1:09
21.	"Ride to See Elphie"	3:50
22.	"In the Closet"	1:25
23.	"The Melting"	1:46
24.	"The Story of the Green Bottle"	2:06
25.	"The Rise of Glinda"	2:14
26.	"Glinda's Speech"	3:15
27.	"A Wicked Good Finale" (featuring Ariana Grande and Cynthia Erivo)	4:39
28.	"Wicked: For Good Suite"	2:37
Total length:		84:19

== Personnel ==
All music is composed by John Powell and Stephen Schwartz.

- Nick Wollage – recording engineer
- John Michael Caldwell – mixing engineer, recording engineer
- Jack Dolman – editing engineer
- Catherine Wilson – editing engineer
- Laura Agudelo Cuartas – editing engineer
- Alec Lubin – assistant mixing engineer
- Patricia Sullivan – mastering engineer
- Batu Sener – additional music and arrangements
- Markus Siegel – additional music and arrangements
- Paul Mounsey – additional music and arrangements
- Alec Lubin – additional midi programming
- Jonathan Beard – score orchestration
- Edward Trybek – score orchestration
- Henri Wilkinson – score orchestration
- Sean Barrett – additional score orchestration
- Jennifer Dirkes – additional score orchestration
- Benjamin Hoff – additional score orchestration
- Steven Rader – additional score orchestration
- Jacob Shrum – additional score orchestration
- Jamie Thierman – additional score orchestration
- Gavin Greenaway – orchestra conductor
- John Powell – choir conductor

=== Musicians ===
- Jo Archard – violin
- Millie Ashton – violin
- Daniel Bhattacharya – violin
- Natalia Bonner – violin
- Ben Buckton – violin
- Christina Emanuel – violin
- Dai Emanuel – violin
- Richard George – violin
- Clio Gould – violin
- Alison Harling – violin
- Ian Humphries – violin
- Charis Jenson – violin
- Julian Leaper – violin
- Gaby Lester – violin
- Ciaran McCabe – violin
- Laura Melhuish – violin
- John Mills – violin
- Steve Morris – violin
- Everton Nelson – violin
- Odile Ollagnon – violin
- Nicky Sweeney – violin
- Clare Thompson – violin
- Debbie Widdup – violin
- Matthew Ward – violin
- Warren Zielinski – violin
- Edward Vanderspar – viola
- Nick Barr – viola
- Fiona Bonds – viola
- Abbey Bowen – viola
- Catherine Bradshaw – viola
- Reiad Chibah – viola
- Clare Finnimore – viola
- Morgan Goff – viola
- Clive Howard – viola
- Helen Kamminga – viola
- Fiona Leggat – viola
- Lydia Lowndes-Northcott – viola
- Andy Parker – viola
- Katie Wilkinson – viola
- Caroline Dale – cello
- Chris Allan – cello
- Adrian Bradbury – cello
- Ian Burdge – cello
- Nick Cooper – cello
- David Daniels – cello
- Caroline Dearnley – cello
- Lionel Handy – cello
- Sophie Harris – cello
- Katherine Jenkinson – cello
- David Lale – cello
- Rachel Lander – cello
- Vicky Matthews – cello
- Jonathan Tunnell – cello
- Bozidar Vukotic – cello
- Tony Woollard – cello
- Paul Kimber – double bass
- Roger Linley – double bass
- Steve Mair – double bass
- Beth Symmons – double bass
- Laurence Ungless – double bass
- Samuel Coles – flute
- David Cuthbert – flute
- Tom Hancox – flute
- Karen Jones – flute
- Helen Keen – flute
- Anna Noakes – flute
- Gareth Hulse – oboe
- Janey Miller – oboe
- Tim Rundle – oboe
- Jordan Black – clarinet
- James Burke – clarinet
- David Fuest – clarinet
- Maura Marinucci – clarinet
- Julian Poole – clarinet
- Paul Boyes – bassoon
- Sarah Burnett – bassoon
- Gavin McNaughton – bassoon
- Dominic Morgan – bassoon
- Rachel Simms – bassoon
- Corinne Bailey – horn
- Richard Bissill – horn
- Nigel Black – horn
- Carys Evans – horn
- Annemarie Federle – horn
- Nicholas Korth – horn
- Phil Munds – horn
- Martin Owen – horn
- Michael Thompson – horn
- John Thurgood – horn
- Henry Ward – horn
- Richard Watkins – horn
- Jonathan Williams – horn
- Philip Cobb – trumpet
- Jason Evans – trumpet
- James Fountain – trumpet
- Tom Fountain – trumpet
- Kate Moore – trumpet
- Daniel Newell – trumpet
- Patrick White – trumpet
- Barry Clements – trombone
- Tracy Holloway – trombone
- Ed Tarrant – trombone
- Andy Wood – trombone
- Owen Slade – tuba
- Bobby Ball – percussion
- Chris Baron – percussion
- Dave Elliot – percussion
- Rob Farrer – percussion
- Julian Poole – percussion
- Barnaby Archer – timpani
- Jeremy Cornes – timpani
- David Arch – piano, celesta
- Helen Tunstall – harp
- Hugh Webb – harp

== Charts ==
Chart performance for Wicked: For Good – The Original Motion Picture Score
Chart (2025)	Peak position
UK Album Downloads (Official Charts)	43

== Release history ==
Release history and formats for Wicked: For Good – The Original Motion Picture Score
Region	Date	Format(s)	Label(s)	Ref.
Various	December 5, 2025	Digital download; streaming; LP; CD	Republic; Verve	
