= That Christmas (soundtrack) =

2024 soundtrack album by John Powell

That Christmas (Soundtrack from the Netflix Film)

Soundtrack album by John Powell
- Released: 4 December 2024
- Recorded: 2023
- Studios: Abbey Road Studios; 5 Cat Studios
- Genre: Christmas music
- Length: 57:45
- Label: Netflix Music
- Producer: John Powell

John Powell chronology
| Wicked: The Original Motion Picture Score (2024) | That Christmas (Soundtrack from the Netflix Film) (2024) | How to Train Your Dragon (Original Motion Picture Soundtrack) (2025) |

That Christmas (Soundtrack from the Netflix Film) is the soundtrack album to the 2024 Netflix and Locksmith Animation film That Christmas. The soundtrack album features John Powell's musical score with additional music composed by Batu Sener, Anthony Willis, Markus Siegel, LeTroy Davis II, singer Ed Sheeran and Snow Patrol member Johnny McDaid. The soundtrack album was recorded in 2023 at Abbey Road Studios in London and was mixed at Powell's music production facility and record label 5 Cat Studios in Los Angeles. The soundtrack album was also released on 4 December 2024 on Netflix Music. That Christmas (Soundtrack from the Netflix Film) received positive reviews from critics and became available on Spotify, Apple Music and YouTube Music.

== Production ==
In November 2023, it was announced that John Powell would compose and produce the musical score for That Christmas.

=== Ed Sheeran song ===
In August 2024, it was announced that singer Ed Sheeran and Snow Patrol member Johnny McDaid would write and produce "Under the Tree", a song for That Christmas. The song was released as a non-album digital single on 26 November 2024 by Sheeran's vanity record label Gingerbread Man Records and became available on Spotify, Apple Music and YouTube Music. "Under the Tree" reached top 40 on the charts in Italy, Belgium and Germany. The song's music video, titled Ed Sheeran: Under the Tree, was directed by Richard Curtis, produced by Ramshackle Productions and Dan Matthews, cinematographed by Danny Cohen and edited by Sim Evan-Jones. The music video stars Sheeran as himself and Bridgerton actress Claudia Jessie as Anna and it also features some That Christmas scenes. Ed Sheeran: Under the Tree was also filmed in the Suffolk seaside town of Southwold (which is one of the three inspirations for the fictional Suffolk seaside town of Wellington-on-Sea in That Christmas) as well as being uploaded on YouTube on 27 November 2024.

== Track listing ==
All music is composed by John Powell.

| No. | Title | Length |
|---|---|---|
| 1. | "Meet Our Heroes" | 4:51 |
| 2. | "Wellington-By-The-Sea" | 1:53 |
| 3. | "Sticky Notes" | 0:58 |
| 4. | "Snow Arrives" | 3:24 |
| 5. | "Doggy Prank" | 1:00 |
| 6. | "Snow People" | 1:46 |
| 7. | "Building the Igloo" | 1:41 |
| 8. | "Parents Leaving" | 1:09 |
| 9. | "Turkey Heist" | 2:24 |
| 10. | "Shop Romance" | 2:05 |
| 11. | "Parents in Trouble" | 2:09 |
| 12. | "Santa Arrives" | 3:12 |
| 13. | "This Rarely Happens" | 2:28 |
| 14. | "The Twin's Christmas" | 1:14 |
| 15. | "Officially Nice" | 2:19 |
| 16. | "Bernie's Our Christmas" | 2:50 |
| 17. | "Danny Left Alone" | 1:02 |
| 18. | "Visiting Trapper" | 2:43 |
| 19. | "Calling Miss for Help" | 3:55 |
| 20. | "Hide and Seek" | 3:14 |
| 21. | "Searching and Finding" | 9:29 |
| 22. | "Boxing Day" | 1:59 |
| Total length: | | 57:45 |

== Songs featured in That Christmas and not featured on its soundtrack album ==
That Christmas features songs which are not featured on its soundtrack album, including "Boom Shack-A-Lak" by Apache Indian, "Underneath the Tree" by Kelly Clarkson (which was also featured in the film's trailer with "Mountain Sleigh Ride" by Cavendish Music and "Say It Ain't Snow" by Extreme Music), "Snowflakes" by Emmy the Great and Ash frontman Tim Wheeler, "Christmas Lights" by Coldplay and "Under the Tree" by Ed Sheeran as well as renditions of "Wannabe" by The Spice Girls, "Happy Birthday" by Stevie Wonder, "Levitating" by Dua Lipa, "Papa Don't Preach" by Madonna, "Santa Claus Is Comin' to Town" by J. Fred Coots and Haven Gillespie, "Silent Night" by Franz Xaver Gruber and "Nessun dorma" by Giacomo Puccini. Rhian Sheehan's 2014 instrumental song "Thin Ice" was originally going to be featured in That Christmas as well.

== Soundtrack album credits and personnel ==
- Musical score composer, musical score producer and soundtrack album producer: John Powell
- Additional music composers: Anthony Willis, Markus Siegel, Johnny McDaid, Batu Sener, Ed Sheeran and LeTroy Davis II
- Music supervisor: Nick Angel
- Music editors: Richard Armstrong and Cecile Tournesac
- Additional music editor: Laurence Love Greed
- Temp music editor: Yann McCullough
- Scoring editor: David Channing
- Music contractor: Edie Lehmann Boddicker
- Music coordinator: Lily Leonard
- Score assistant engineer: Neil Dawes
- Score production assistants: Natalia Goldstein, Andreas Häberlin and Dora Kmezic
- Score recordist: Nick Wollage
- Digital score recordist: George Oulton
- Score mixer: John Michael Caldwell
- Score mix assistant: Alec Lubin
- Music production executives: Mackenzie Coats and Angelo Chacon
- Music preparation: Jill Streater, Ann Barnard, Dan Boardman and Leo Nicholson
- Music copying: Global Music Service
- Music clearance: Pru Miller
- Music agent: Laura Engel
- Soundtrack album releasing: Netflix Music
- Soundtrack album recording: Abbey Road Studios
- Soundtrack album mixing: 5 Cat Studios
- Soundtrack album mastering: Patricia Sullivan
- Abbey Road Studios manager: Fiona Gillott
- Abbey Road Studios bookings manager: Kayla Hopkins
- Abbey Road Studios bookings assistant: Ellie MacReady
- Booth reader: Emlyn Singleton

=== Musicians ===
- Violins: Jo Archard, Mark Berrow, Daniel Bhattacharya, Natalia Bonner, Fiona Brett, Charlie Brown, Emil Chakalov, Ralph De Souza, Christina Emanuel, Dai Emanuel, Richard George, Kathy Gowers, Alison Harling, Ian Humphries, Alison Kelly, Patrick Kiernan, Laura Melhuish, John Mills, Perry Montague-Mason, Everton Nelson, Tom Pigott-Smith, Jackie Shave, Nicky Sweeney, Emil Tchakarov, Cathy Thompson, Clare Thompson, Matthew Ward, Debbie Widdup and Warren Zielinski
- Violas: Katie Wilkinson, Bruce White, Andy Parker, Kate Musker, Fiona Leggat, Helen Kamminga, Clive Howard, Clare Finnimore, Fiona Bonds, Reiad Chibah and Nick Barr
- Cellos: Tony Woollard, Bozidar Vukotic, Vicky Matthews, Dave Lale, Rachael Lander, Adrian Bradbury, Sophie Harris, Caroline Dearnley, Nick Cooper and Ian Burdge
- Basses: Laurence Ungless, Marcus van Horn, Steve Rossell, Beth Symmons, Roger Linley, Steve Mair and Andy Marshall
- Flutes: Rowland Sutherland, Anna Noakes, Karen Jones, Helen Keen and Samuel Coles
- Oboes: Tim Rundle and Janey Miller
- Clarinets: Anthony Pike, Duncan Ashby, Joy Farrall and David Fuest
- Bassoons: Daniel Jemison, Gavin McNaughton and Rachel Simms
- French Horns: John Thurgood, Martin Owen, Richard Watkins, Diego Incertis, Nigel Black and Corinne Bailey
- Trumpets: Jason Evans, Tom Fountain, Kate Moore, Daniel Newell and Patrick White
- Trombones: Andy Wood, Ed Tarrant, Tracy Holloway and Barry Clements
- Tuba: Owen Slade
- Harps: Bryn Lewis and Hugh Webb
- Guitar: Vivian Vilichkoff
- Piano: Simon Chamberlain
- Vocals: Randy Crenshaw, Caleb Curry, Allie Feder, James Hayden and Suzanne Waters

=== Orchestra ===
- Orchestra leader: Jeremy Isaac
- Orchestra contractors: Isobel Griffiths Limited, Amy Ewen and Lucy Whalley
- Orchestra conductor: Gavin Greenaway
- Orchestrators: Tracie Turnbull and Peter Michael Davison
- Additional orchestrators: Shaun Dale Crawford and Danny Keane

== Reception ==
=== Critical reviews ===
Filmtracks wrote "The score's weakness comes in the more wayward applications in the final third and lack of connection with the good Sheeran song. Some listeners may find the whole to be overplayed in its intensity and thus overwhelm haphazardly on the songless album. But That Christmas is a charming genre outing for Powell, and its rousing action sequences for the main theme notch it above Migration. This music represents Powell in his wheelhouse, and it's always a pleasure to hear." James Southall of Movie Wave wrote "This really is a delightful album of music, for my money the composer's strongest since The Call of the Wild – so warm-hearted, blessed with a pair of catchy themes, thoroughly entertaining from start to finish." Peter Debruge of Variety said that "composer John Powell supplies a swirling orchestral score that gives the whole enterprise a sense of scale."

=== Award nominations ===
| Award | Year | Category | Award nomination(s) | Result | Ref. |
|---|---|---|---|---|---|
| 15th Hollywood Music in Media Awards | 2024 | Best Original Score in an Animated Film | John Powell | Nominated | |
| 52nd Annie Awards | 2025 | Outstanding Achievement for Music in an Animated Feature | John Powell, Ed Sheeran and Johnny McDaid | Nominated | |
| IFMCA Awards | 2025 | Best Original Score for an Animated Film | John Powell | Nominated | |
| 4th Children's and Family Emmy Awards | 2026 | Outstanding Music Direction and Composition for an Animated Program | John Powell | Nominated | |
