= The Call of the Wild (soundtrack) =

The Call of the Wild (Original Motion Picture Soundtrack)

Film score by John Powell
- Released: February 21, 2020
- Recorded: 2019–2020
- Studio: Newman Scoring Stage, 20th Century Studios, Los Angeles
- Genre: Film score
- Length: 1:07:11
- Label: Hollywood
- Producer: John Powell; Batu Sener

John Powell chronology
How to Train Your Dragon: The Hidden World (2019)	The Call of the Wild (2020)	Locked Down (2021)

The Call of the Wild (Original Motion Picture Soundtrack) is the film score to the 2020 film The Call of the Wild directed by Chris Sanders. The film score is composed, produced and conducted by John Powell and released through Hollywood Records on February 21, 2020, alongside the film.

== Background ==
In January 2019, it was announced that John Powell would compose the film's score, after previously working with Sanders on the DreamWorks Animation film How to Train Your Dragon (2010). Sanders considered him as the right choice, for "his ability to transport us so fully to a time and place" as the film is set during the Gold rush days at Yukon in the 1890s. The music needed to be something "folksy", while Powell called it "immigrant music, a kind of music that seemed to be part of that world". Thus, the score uses banjos, accordions, mandolins, guitars, fiddles and harmonium.

Powell stated that most immigrants from France and Ireland, would take banjos and accordions due to their mobility. Hence, those instruments along with Irish and native American flutes along with penny whistles round out the ethnic soundscape. Further, he used English and Scottish flavors to provide a rhythmic dance-like movement. He stated "[The music] can be very slow because people are just talking, or very fast because people are in peril, but dance is, to me, very much the sound of music." He referenced the barn dance sequence from Seven Brides for Seven Brothers (1954) where a phrase from the song "Bless Your Beautiful Hide" was incorporated organically.

Sanders stated that music served as the voice of Buck in the critical moments. Numerous themes underline the aspects of the story, but Buck's "work tune" was described the most fun, Powell had worked, as the theme involved an ensemble of 12 banjos, adding "It's about the toughness of work and the nobility of running". Powell also employed 12 session guitarists, who worked with world-renowned artists to perform passages on acoustic guitar and mandolin. While the score accompanied Buck's worlds, Powell also composed music of "regret and loss" for Thornton (Harrison Ford) as he was "the facilitator of Buck's launch into a world that he can be authentic in." He also used a disquieting sound for the mysterious giant black wolf which Buck can see.

The score was recorded at the Newman Scoring Stage in 20th Century Studios lot at Los Angeles, with Powell conducting a 90-piece orchestra and employing a 60-voice choir for the score, performing Inuit phrases. Powell's regular composers Batu Sener and Paul Mounsey, provided additional music.

== Release ==
The soundtrack featuring 23 tracks, was released digitally on February 21, 2020, by Hollywood Records.

== Track listing ==
The Call of the Wild (Original Motion Picture Soundtrack)
No.	Title	Length
1.	"Wake the Girls"	2:37
2.	"Train North"	4:01
3.	"Skagway, Alaska"	2:30
4.	"Snowy Climb"	1:24
5.	"First Sledding Attempt"	2:27
6.	"The Ghost Wolf of Dreams"	1:05
7.	"Joining the Team"	2:58
8.	"Ice Rescue"	2:26
9.	"Sometimes Nature's Cruel and Gods Fight"	4:57
10.	"Buck Takes the Lead"	4:54
11.	"We Carry Love"	3:01
12.	"Couldn't Find the Words"	2:21
13.	"Overpacked Sled"	2:31
14.	"Newfangled Telegram"	2:23
15.	"In My Bed?"	2:53
16.	"Buck & Thornton's Big Adventure"	4:35
17.	"Finding Bears and Love in the Woods"	2:56
18.	"They've all Gone"	2:51
19.	"Rewilding"	3:47
20.	"Animal Nature"	2:34
21.	"Come Say Goodbye"	2:08
22.	"What An Adventure"	3:01
23.	"The Call of the Wild"	2:51
Total length:		1:07:11

== Reception ==
Jonathan Broxton of Movie Music UK wrote "The music is a perfect example of aural storytelling: the orchestrations bring a sense of time and place that is unique to the film's setting, and the different thematic ideas and the concepts they represent combine in intelligent ways that subtly convey the complexity of shifting relationships to the audience. The emotional pull of the score is irresistible – the action, the pathos, the drama, the sentiment, the adventure, all clear and abundant, allowing the audience to feel everything Buck is going through. And, from a musical enjoyment point of view, the warmth of the harmonies and the beauty of the thematic ideas are superb. Although anyone with an aversion to banjos and fiddles may find themselves squirming uncomfortably whenever those instruments are especially prominent, everything else in The Call of the Wild is exemplary and further proves that John Powell is one of the best composers working in film music today." Filmtracks wrote "Powell's work for The Call of the Wild transcends the stereotypes of Western film music, merging that genre with modern fantasy and adventure sensibilities to form one of the most uniquely satisfying soundtrack experiences of its era. The composer proves once again that he stands high on the A-list of his contemporaries, and the music for The Call of the Wild will continue to gain respect long after the film is forgotten."

James Southall of Movie Wave wrote "The Call of the Wild is so big-hearted, so full of warmth – as well as classic action/adventure music – all put through the composer's trademark busy, intricate style, this time with some colourful folk touches to add extra colour. The 67-minute album doesn't sag at all, just keeps offering fresh delights – it's Powell at his very best." Anton Smit of Soundtrack World wrote "this is another typical John Powell score. His musical style can be heard throughout the whole score. Not only is there a strong focus on a handful of themes, with the main theme just being absolutely brilliant, but these themes can also be heard in all kinds of styles and emotions, all delivered by the orchestra, choir and some folk band instruments like the banjo, piano, fiddle and flutes."

Eric Kohn of IndieWire called it a "lively but generic orchestral score". David Edelstein of Vulture wrote "John Powell's incessantly sentimental score keeps all traces of unruliness at bay." Ian Freer of Empire called the score "stirring".

== "Piano Solos" album ==
In October 2020, Powell released the album Piano Solos from The Call of the Wild. The album features ten tracks from Powell's original score, arranged for solo piano and performed by Batu Sener, a composer and musician who is Powell's frequent collaborator (including on The Call of the Wild). The arrangements from this album are printed and distributed by Hal Leonard Publishing Company. The album was released by Powell's own record label, 5 Cat Studios. This is the second "piano solos" album from Powell and Sener, the first being Piano Solos from How to Train Your Dragon: The Hidden World, released in May 2020.

Piano Solos from The Call of the Wild
No.	Title	Length
1.	"Wake the Girls"	3:04
2.	"Snowy Climb"	1:28
3.	"Joining the Team"	2:56
4.	"Buck Takes the Lead"	2:25
5.	"We Carry Love"	3:24
6.	"Couldn't Find the Words"	2:28
7.	"Newfangled Telegram"	2:41
8.	"They're All Gone"	1:22
9.	"What an Adventure"	4:57
10.	"The Call of the Wild"	2:53
Total length:		27:38

== Personnel ==
Credits adapted from liner notes:

- Music composer and conductor – John Powell
- Music producer – John Powell, Batu Sener
- Additional music and arrangements – Batu Sener, Paul Mounsey
- Recording and mixing – Shawn Murphy
- Mastering – Patricia Sullivan
- Orchestra – Hollywood Studio Symphony
- Contractor – Gina Zimmitti, Whitney Martin
- Orchestra leader – Belinda Broughton, Roger Wilkie
- Concertmaster – Bruce Dukov

Instruments

- Bass – Chris Kollgaard, Drew Dembowski, Eric Shetzen, Geoff Osika, Ian Walker, Ian Walker, Mike Valerio, Oscar Hidalgo, Thomas Harte, Ed Meares
- Cello – Armen Ksajikian, Cecilia Tsan, Charlie Tyler, David Low, Dennis Karmazyn, Elizabeth Wright, Eric Byers, Erika Duke Kirkpatrick, Evgeny Tonkha, Giovanna Clayton, Jacob Braun, Julie Jung, Mike Kaufman, Ross Gasworth, Tim Loo, Trevor Handy, Steve Erdody, Vanessa Freebairn Smith
- Flute – Jenni Olson, Johanna Borenstein, Heather Clark
- Oboe – Chris Bleth, Jessica Pearlman, Lelie Resnick, Lara Wickes, Leslie Reed
- Viola – Aaron Oltman, Alma Fernandez, Andrew Duckles, Ben Ullery, Caroline Buckman, Darrin McCann, David Walther, Diana Wade, Zach Dellinger, Jonathan Moerschel, Linnea Powell, Luke Maurer, Meredith Crawford, Nolan Livesay, Robert Brophy, Rodney Wirtz, Shawn Mann, Erik Rynearson
- Violin – Adrianne Pope, Alyssa Park, Amy Hershberger, Andrew Bulbrook, Ashoka Thiagarajan, Ben Jacobson, Carrie Kennedy, Charlie Bisharat, Daphne Chen, Grace Oh, Ina Veli, Jackie Brand, Jessica Guideri, Joel Pargman, Josefina Vergara, Katie Sloan, Kerenza Peacock, Kevin Kumar, Luanne Homzy, Lucia Micarelli, Maia Jasper, Marisa Kuney, Mark Robertson, Natalie Leggett, Neel Hammond, Nina Evtuhov, Paul Cartwright, Phil Levy, Sandy Cameron, Sara Parkins, Sarah Thornblade, Shalini Vijayan, Songa Lee, Tammy Hatwan, Tereza Stanislav

== Accolades ==
Year	Award	Category	Recipients	Result	Ref.
2020	World Soundtrack Awards	Public Choice Award	John Powell	Nominated	
2021	International Film Music Critics Association	Film Score of the Year	John Powell	Nominated	
2021	International Film Music Critics Association	Film Music Composition of the Year	John Powell – ("Buck Takes the Lead")	Nominated	
2021	International Film Music Critics Association	Best Original Score for an Action/Adventure/Thriller Film	John Powell	Won	
