= How to Train Your Dragon (2025 soundtrack) =

2025 soundtrack album

How to Train Your Dragon (Original Motion Picture Soundtrack)

Film score by John Powell
- Released: June 13, 2025
- Recorded: January–April 2025
- Studios: AIR Studios, London; Remote Control Productions, Santa Monica, California; Newman Scoring Stage, 20th Century Studios
- Genre: Film score
- Length: 1:46:02
- Label: Back Lot Music
- Producer: John Powell

John Powell chronology
That Christmas (Soundtrack from the Netflix Film) (2024)	How to Train Your Dragon (Original Motion Picture Soundtrack) (2025)	Wicked: For Good – The Original Motion Picture Score (2025)

Singles from How to Train Your Dragon (Original Motion Picture Soundtrack)
- 1. "Test Driving Toothless" Released: May 27, 2025

How to Train Your Dragon (Original Motion Picture Soundtrack) is the film score to the 2025 film How to Train Your Dragon; a live-action remake of the 2010 animated film of the same name. John Powell, who composed the original film trilogy, returned to score the film. It was released under the Back Lot Music label on June 13, 2025, the same day as the film.

== Development ==
In February 2023, John Powell revealed he was set to compose the film's music, after he previously scored the original film trilogy. DeBlois recalled that "John saw the same potential that I did; he believed that if we made a live-action version with love and respect for the fan base, it could end up being a nostalgic hug for existing fans and a whole new experience for a new generation. So, he said: 'If you're in, I'm in.'" For the live action film, Powell revisited his work for the original film and instead of reusing the same tunes, he had to honor the original film, which was difficult as the storytelling and filmmaking techniques were different from the original film, including the change of tempo, key and orchestrations, as well as the pacing, approach and emphasis in the tunes. Powell said, "It just took an awful lot of massaging and managing and chipping away at it. I feel like I did about three months of sanding."

During the Palisades Fire incident in January 2025, Powell worked on the film's music finding a certain cue for the score. Having lived in the Palisades for around two decades, and noticing the fires start and put out and warnings put down and rescinded, the current situation was much different with the situation escalating at times, which led Powell covering the vents and holes in the house and spraying with pool pumps but still could not stop thinking about the score. But after his son messaged him multiple times reminding him of the incident, he became aware of the situation and vacated the place, taking two poodles and a 12-terabyte backup drive that contained every single piece of music he wrote. After the incident, he moved to an Airbnb several times and then to Hans Zimmer's studio Remote Control Productions in Santa Monica, California, for working on the score. Having a month left to record the orchestra, Powell felt confident, saying, "It wasn't like I could call Universal and say, 'Can we move the recording dates and the mixing dates and the release date?' I have a responsibility to make sure that I get the music done on time [...] You've just got the work in front of you, and that becomes the most important thing at that moment, which is slightly sad to say, but it's a useful thing under those sort of circumstances."

The recording of the orchestral sections happened at the AIR Studios in London, with Gavin Greenaway conducting the 120-piece London Symphony Orchestra. However, Powell conducted the 60-member vocal choir at the Newman Scoring Stage on the 20th Century Studio lot.

== Release ==
The soundtrack was preceded by the lead single "Test Driving Toothless" which released on May 27, 2025. It was released through Back Lot Music label on June 13, the same day as the film. Mondo Media will release the physical editions of the album via 2-disc CD digipak in early September, and as a 3-disc vinyl LP on July 25.

== Track listing ==
All music is composed by John Powell.

How to Train Your Dragon (Original Motion Picture Soundtrack) track listing
No.	Title	Length
1.	"This Is Real Berk"	7:48
2.	"I Hit a Night Fury"	2:03
3.	"I Want to Be One of You Guys"	1:21
4.	"Conference of the Tribes"	2:12
5.	"He's Not That Boy"	1:19
6.	"Searching the Woods"	3:26
7.	"Home in the Ring"	2:37
8.	"First Dragon Training"	3:57
9.	"Sketches of a Wounded Dragon"	2:43
10.	"Our Most Valuable Possession"	3:01
11.	"I'm Beginning to Question Your Teaching Methods!"	3:47
12.	"A Really Forbidden Friendship"	4:47
13.	"Carefully Attaching"	2:48
14.	"Charming the Zippleback"	1:43
15.	"He Has a Way with the Beasts"	4:28
16.	"Test Driving Toothless"	3:06
17.	"Top Slayer"	2:28
18.	"Caught Designing Outfits"	2:26
19.	"A Romantic Flight"	2:28
20.	"Taken to the Dragons' Nest"	2:05
21.	"Should We Tell Your Father?"	1:40
22.	"Waiting to Enter the Ring"	2:29
23.	"The Trial of Flame"	4:58
24.	"You're Not My Son"	3:12
25.	"What Are You Going to Do About It?"	3:36
26.	"Prelude to a Battle"	2:18
27.	"Meeting the Queen"	4:18
28.	"Allied Forces"	4:32
29.	"The Wings of the Beast"	2:56
30.	"Finding Hiccup"	4:11
31.	"We Have Dragons"	2:52
32.	"You Are My Homeward"	1:45
33.	"..And Finally, the End Credits Suite"	6:28
Total length:		1:46:02

== Reception ==
Zanobard Reviews rated the soundtrack an 8/10 and wrote "John Powell tries to improve upon perfection with his score for the live-action How to Train Your Dragon movie, to honestly some pretty impressive results. A crisp, refined sound to the orchestration and some utterly stellar cues – including the new "Test Driving Toothless" and an absolute treat of an end credits suite – make this soundtrack a genuine joy to experience, no matter how you feel about remakes." Filmtracks wrote "Powell provides an incredibly vibrant and smart companion to the original 2010 classic. Regardless of what you think about studio money grabs, embrace a rare opportunity to experience this music all over again."

Peter Debruge of Variety noted that Powell's score "conveys the dragon's share of their cross-species affinity". Dessi Gomez of Deadline Hollywood wrote "John Powell's return to compose the music and build on his previously established themes helps the story soar." Shannon Connellan of Mashable called it a "treasured score", while Clarisse Loughrey of The Independent and Ethan Anderton of /Film called it "recognizable" and "triumphant".

== Personnel credits ==
Credits adapted from liner notes:

- Music composer and producer: John Powell
- Music editors: Bill Bernstein, Simon Changer
- Additional music: Batu Sener, Markus Siegel, James McKee Smith, Paul Mounsey, Dominic Lewis, Michael Mollo
- Additional arrangements: George Doering, Pedro Eustache, Germaine Franco, Maeve Gilchrist, Gabe Witcher, Batu Sener, Markus Siegel, James McKee Smith, Paul Mounsey, Dominic Lewis, Michael Mollo
- Orchestration: Jonathan Beard, Edward Trybek, Henri Wilkinson, Tracie Turnbull, John Ashton Thomas, Dave Metzger, David Greenaway, Germaine Franco, Jessica Wells, Stefan Schneider, Angus O'Sullivan, Daniel Baker, James K. Lee
- Additional orchestration: Benjamin Hoff, Sean Barrett, Jamie Thierman, Jacob Shrum, Steven Rader, Jennifer Dirkes
- Orchestra conductor: Gavin Greenaway
- Choir conductor: John Powell
- Orchestra leader: Jeremy Isaac
- Orchestra contractor: Isobel Griffiths Ltd.
- Choir contractors: Holly Sedillos, Edie Lehmann Boddicker
- Recorded at: AIR Studios, The Newman Scoring Stage
- AIR Studios crew: Charlotte Matthews, Katy Jackson
- The Newman Scoring Stage Crew: Stacey Robinson, Damon Tedesco, Hoss Yekband
- Recording engineers: Nick Wollage, John Michael Caldwell
- Assistant engineers: Rebecca Hordern, Wil Jones, Tim Lauber, Adam Magson, Jim Wright
- Score recordists: John Prestage, Chandler Harrod
- Score mixed at: 5 Cat Studios
- Score mixer: John Michael Caldwell
- Score mix assistant: Alec Lubin
- Scoring editor: Laura Agudelo Cuartas
- Music preparation: Jill Streater, Jordan Cox, James Regan, Brad Ritchie
- Sessions librarian: Jill Streater
- Score production assistants: David Neville, Andreas Häberlin, Alisse Laymac, Nick Hodges
- Solo violin: Perry Montague-Mason
- Bodhrán: Kieran Leonard
- Bagpipes: Kyle Howie, Ali Hutton, Lorne MacDougall, Craig Muirhead, Craig Munro

== Release history ==
Release history and formats for How to Train Your Dragon (Original Motion Picture Soundtrack)
Region	Date	Format(s)	Label(s)	Ref.
Various	June 13, 2025	Digital download; streaming	WaterTower Music	
Various	June 27, 2025	CD	Mondo Media	
Various	July 25, 2025	LP	Mondo Media	
