= Wicked (score) =

2024 score album by John Powell and Stephen Schwartz

Wicked: The Original Motion Picture Score

Film score by John Powell and Stephen Schwartz
- Released: December 6, 2024
- Recorded: 2024
- Studios: Abbey Road Studios; AIR Studios; Sony Scoring Stage
- Genre: Film score
- Length: 78:44
- Labels: Republic; Verve

Wicked chronology
Wicked: The Soundtrack (2024)	Wicked: The Original Motion Picture Score (2024)	Wicked: One Wonderful Night – The Soundtrack (2025)

John Powell chronology
Thelma The Unicorn (Soundtrack from the Netflix Film) (2024)	Wicked: The Original Motion Picture Score (2024)	That Christmas (Soundtrack from the Netflix Film) (2024)

Stephen Schwartz chronology
Disenchanted (Original Soundtrack) (2022)	Wicked: The Original Motion Picture Score (2024)	Wicked: For Good – The Original Motion Picture Score (2025)

Singles from Wicked: The Original Motion Picture Score
- 1. "Arrival at Shiz University" Released: November 27, 2024

Wicked: The Original Motion Picture Score is the film score composed by John Powell and Stephen Schwartz for the 2024 film Wicked by Jon M. Chu, which is based on the first act of the stage musical by Schwartz and Winnie Holzman. It was released by Republic Records on December 6, 2024.

== Production ==
On July 8, 2024, it was announced that John Powell would be scoring the film with Stephen Schwartz, who had composed the music for the original stage musical. It was recorded at AIR Studios and Abbey Road Studios in London.

== Release ==
The opening track of the album, "Arrival at Shiz University," was released as a promotional single on November 27, 2024. The score album was released on December 6, 2024. In addition to digital download and streaming, it was also released on LP.

== Accolades ==
Wicked: The Original Motion Picture Score awards and nominations
Award	Year (Note: Indicates the year of ceremony. Each year is linked to the article about the awards held that year, wherever possible.)	Category	Recipients	Result	Ref.
Academy Awards	2025	Best Original Score	John Powell and Stephen Schwartz	Nominated	
Astra Creative Arts Awards	2024	Best Original Score	John Powell and Stephen Schwartz	Nominated	
Chicago Film Critics Association Awards	2024	Best Original Score	John Powell and Stephen Schwartz	Nominated	
Grammy Awards	2026	Best Score Soundtrack for Visual Media	John Powell and Stephen Schwartz	Nominated	
Grammy Awards	2026	Best Instrumental Composition	"Train to Emerald City"	Nominated	

== Track listing ==
Wicked: The Original Motion Picture Score track listing
No.	Title	Length
1.	"Arrival at Shiz University"	2:07
2.	"Our Heroes Meet"	1:54
3.	"Nessarose"	1:10
4.	"Meet the Faculty"	3:34
5.	"Elphaba's Power"	3:35
6.	"How to Loathe Your Roommate"	3:43
7.	"History Lesson"	3:46
8.	"Levitate the Coin"	2:17
9.	"All Around Something Bad"	2:17
10.	"Prince Fiyero of Winkie Country"	3:16
11.	"The Book Place"	2:00
12.	"Elphaba at Ozdust"	3:02
13.	"Sharing Secrets"	2:00
14.	"Look at You"	1:19
15.	"Replacement Teacher"	3:49
16.	"Cub Rescue"	1:45
17.	"Forest Feelings"	2:02
18.	"Ozian Invitation"	2:30
19.	"Galinda Becomes Glinda"	3:36
20.	"Train to Emerald City"	2:18
21.	"Hall of Grandiosity"	2:40
22.	"A Wizard's Plan"	4:23
23.	"The Grimmerie"	2:06
24.	"Transformations"	8:10
25.	"Monkey Mayhem"	3:40
26.	"All Around Defying Gravity"	5:45
Total length:		78:44

=== For Your Consideration ===
A For Your Consideration album was released through Universal Pictures' press website in late 2024, featuring 34 tracks that differ from the general release.

No.	Title	Length
1.	"Opening Build"	0:37
2.	"Green Childhood"	2:28
3.	"Glinda's Entrance"	2:07
4.	"Our Heroes Meet"	1:54
5.	"Go With Her"	1:03
6.	"Meet the Faculty"	3:46
7.	"The Other Daughter / Wheelchair / Volunteering"	3:35
8.	"Reluctant Roommates"	2:40
9.	"Off to Class"	0:43
10.	"History Lesson"	3:48
11.	"Levitate the Coin"	2:17
12.	"Elphaba Follows / Something Bad / Tea with Dillamond / You'd Better Go"	4:29
13.	"Fiyero Meets Elphaba / Glinda Readies / Book Place"	5:16
14.	"Glinda Prepping"	1:45
15.	"Elphaba's Entrance"	1:05
16.	"The Hat / Humiliation Together"	2:10
17.	"Sharing Secrets"	2:00
18.	"Look at You"	1:18
19.	"Dillamond Detained"	4:19
20.	"Cub Rescue"	1:44
21.	"Forest Feelings"	2:01
22.	"Ozian Invitation / Train Station"	6:00
23.	"Sendoff"	2:17
24.	"Hall of Grandiosity"	2:18
25.	"His Ozness / Yellow Brick Road"	4:22
26.	"The Grimmerie"	2:06
27.	"Levitation / No Real Power"	8:10
28.	"Monkey Mayhem / Balloon Escape"	3:38
29.	"Open Your Eyes"	0:28
30.	"Propaganda Speech"	1:07
31.	"The Broom"	1:28
32.	"The Cape"	1:45
33.	"Leap of Faith"	1:26
34.	"End Titles"	5:44
Total length:		91:54

== Personnel ==
All music is composed by John Powell and Stephen Schwartz.

- Nick Wollage – recording engineer
- John Michael Caldwell – mixing engineer, recording engineer
- Jack Dolman – editing engineer
- Catherine Wilson – editing engineer
- Laura Agudelo Cuartas – editing engineer
- Alec Lubin – assistant mixing engineer
- Patricia Sullivan – mastering engineer
- Batu Sener – additional music and arrangements
- Markus Siegel – additional music and arrangements
- Jonathan Beard – score orchestration
- Edward Trybek – score orchestration
- Henri Wilkinson – score orchestration
- Sean Barrett – additional score orchestration
- Jennifer Dirkes – additional score orchestration
- Benjamin Hoff – additional score orchestration
- Steven Rader – additional score orchestration
- Jacob Shrum – additional score orchestration
- Jamie Thierman – additional score orchestration
- Gavin Greenaway – orchestra conductor
- John Powell – choir conductor, piano

=== Musicians ===
- Fenella Barton – violin
- Mark Berrow – violin
- Daniel Bhattacharya – violin
- Maya Bickel – violin
- Natalia Bonner – violin
- Charlie Brown – violin
- Ben Buckton – violin
- Martin Burgess – violin
- Emil Chakalov – violin
- Miranda Dale – violin
- Harriet Davies – violin
- Dai Emanuel – violin
- Richard George – violin
- Jenny Godsen – violin
- Raja Halder – violin
- Philippe Honoré – violin
- Ian Humphries – violin
- David Juritz – violin
- Patrick Kiernan – violin
- Julian Leaper – violin
- Bea Lovejoy – violin
- Pauline Lowbury – violin
- Dorina Markoff – violin
- Lorraine McAslan – violin
- Ciaran McCabe – violin
- Laura Melhuish – violin
- Steve Morris – violin
- Greta Mutlu – violin
- Everton Nelson – violin
- Odile Ollagnon – violin
- Oscar Perks – violin
- Tom Pigott-Smith – violin
- Sarah Sexton – violin
- Nicky Sweeney – violin
- Anna Szabo – violin
- Cathy Thompson – violin
- Clare Thompson – violin
- Matthew Ward – violin
- Debbie Widdup – violin
- Laurie Anderson – viola
- Nick Barr – viola
- Anne Beilby – viola
- Elisa Bergersen – viola
- Sue Dench – viola
- Clare Finnimore – viola
- Martin Humbey – viola
- Helen Kamminga – viola
- Peter Lale – viola
- Fiona Leggat – viola
- Lydia Lowndes-Northcott – viola
- Kate Musker – viola
- Andrew Parker – viola
- Edward Vanderspar – viola
- Vicci Wardman – viola
- Bruce White – viola
- Katie Wilkinson – viola
- Chris Allan – cello
- Anna Beryl – cello
- Adrian Bradbury – cello
- Nick Cooper – cello
- David Daniels – cello
- Sarah Davison – cello
- Caroline Dearnley – cello
- Tim Gill – cello
- Sophie Harris – cello
- Rachael Lander – cello
- Zoë Martlew – cello
- Vicky Matthews – cello
- Ben Rogerson – cello
- Frank Schaefer – cello
- Bozidar Vukotic – cello
- Juliet Welchman – cello
- Tony Woollard – cello
- Lucy Hare – double bass
- Beverley Jones – double bass
- Paul Kimber – double bass
- Roger Linley – double bass
- Steve Mair – double bass
- Rupert Ring – double bass
- Steve Rossell – double bass
- Beth Symmons – double bass
- Laurence Ungless – double bass
- Stephen Williams – double bass
- Dominic Worsley – double bass
- David Cuthbert – flute
- Karen Jones – flute
- Helen Keen – flute
- Anna Noakes – flute
- Tom Blomfield – oboe
- Tim Rundle – oboe
- Janey Miller – oboe
- Joy Farrall – clarinet
- Maura Marinucci – clarinet
- Oliver Pashley – clarinet
- Duncan Ashby – bass clarinet
- Anthony Pike – bass clarinet
- Rebecca Austen-Brown – recorder
- Louise Bradbury – recorder
- Bradley Knight – recorder
- Bill Lyons – recorder
- Eliza Marshall – recorder
- Rowland Sutherland – recorder
- David Fuest – contrabass recorder
- Sarah Burnett – bassoon
- Paul Boyes contrabassoon
- Gavin McNaughton – contrabassoon
- Rachel Simms – contrabassoon
- Christian Barraclough – trumpet
- Philip Cobb – trumpet
- Tom Fountain – trumpet
- Kate Moore – trumpet
- Daniel Newell – trumpet
- Patrick White – trumpet
- Matt Williams – trumpet
- Corinne Bailey – French horn
- Eleanor Blakeney – French horn
- Ben Hulme – French horn
- Nicholas Korth – French horn
- Phillippa Koush-Jalali – French horn
- Martin Owen – French horn
- Frank Ricotti – French horn, percussion
- Tim Thorpe – French horn
- John Thurgood – French horn
- Mark Vines – French horn
- Richard Watkins – French horn
- Mark Adam Wood, Jr. – French horn
- Phil Woods – French horn
- Tracy Holloway – trombone
- Andy Wood – trombone
- Barry Clements – bass trombone
- Ed Tarrant – bass trombone
- Owen Slade – tuba
- Chris Baron – percussion
- Gary Kettel – percussion
- Julian Poole – percussion
- Matthew Senior – percussion
- Bill Lockhart – timpani
- David Arch – piano, celesta
- Mark Bass – harp
- Bryn Lewis – harp
- Hugh Webb – harp

=== Vocalists ===
- April Amante – soprano
- Monique Donnelly – soprano
- Allie Feder – soprano
- Graycen Gardner – soprano
- Kelci Hahn – soprano
- Elissa Johnston – soprano
- Caroline McKenzie – soprano
- Beth Peregrine – soprano
- Zanaida Robles – soprano
- Alina Roitstein – soprano
- Anna Schubert – soprano
- Holly Sedillos – soprano
- Kathryn Shuman – soprano
- Courtney Raine Taylor – soprano
- Natalie Babbitt Taylor – soprano
- Chloe Malia Vaught – soprano
- Suzanne Waters – soprano
- Andrea Zomorodian – soprano
- Lindsay Abdou – alto
- Tehillah Alphonso – alto
- Jenny Ashman – alto
- Edie Lehmann Boddicker – alto
- Mindy Ella Chu – alto
- Emily Goglia – alto
- Ayana Haviv – alto
- Laura Flores Jackman – alto
- Shabnam Kalbasi – alto
- Gaayatri Kaundinya – alto
- Sharon Chohi Kim – alto
- Sara Mann – alto
- Baraka May – alto
- Jessica Rotter Murphy – alto
- Ann Sheridan – alto
- Carrah Stamatakis – alto
- Kristen Toedtman – alto
- Elyse Willis – alto
- Matthew Brown – tenor
- Caleb Curry – tenor
- Dermot Kiernan – tenor
- Charlie Kim – tenor
- Charles Lane – tenor
- Michael Lichtenauer – tenor
- Edmond Rodríguez – tenor
- Fletcher Sheridan – tenor
- Todd Strange – tenor
- Greg Whipple – tenor
- Michael Bannett – bass
- Reid Bruton – bass
- David A. Castillo – bass
- Randy Crenshaw – bass
- Dylan Gentile – bass
- William Kenneth Goldman – bass
- Abdiel González – bass
- James Hayden – bass
- Luc Kleiner – bass
- Ben Han-Wei Lin – bass
- David Michael Loucks – bass
- Jamal Michael Moore – bass
- Adrien Redford – bass
- Rene Ruiz – bass

== Release history ==
Release history and formats for Wicked: The Original Motion Picture Score
Region	Date	Format(s)	Label(s)	Ref.
Various	December 6, 2024	Digital download; streaming; LP	Republic; Verve	
