= Solo: A Star Wars Story (soundtrack) =

2018 soundtrack album by John Powell and John Williams

Solo: A Star Wars Story (Original Motion Picture Soundtrack)

Film score by John Powell
- Released: May 25, 2018
- Studio: Abbey Road Studios
- Genre: Soundtrack
- Length: 1:17:11
- Label: Walt Disney
- Producer: John Powell

John Powell chronology
Ferdinand (2017)	Solo: A Star Wars Story (2018)	How to Train Your Dragon: The Hidden World (2019)

Solo: A Star Wars Story (Original Motion Picture Soundtrack) is the soundtrack album to the 2018 film of the same name directed by Ron Howard, which is the second instalment in the Star Wars anthology series. The score is composed by John Powell, with Han Solo's theme conducted and composed by John Williams, whom he had collaborated with for several Star Wars films. Williams composed several demos not included in the soundtrack but later released in the deluxe edition. Besides composing the original themes, Powell also incorporated Williams' music from previous Star Wars films.

Walt Disney Records released the soundtrack album on May 25, 2018, and debuted at third position on soundtracks chart from UK's Official Charts Company. It further received positive response and Powell won the Film Music Composition of the Year award by the International Film Music Critics Association. It was followed by a deluxe edition release on November 20, 2020, that featured Williams' additional cues and unedited demos from the score, and a 2-LP vinyl album was published by Mondo in January 2021.

== Development ==
John Williams' involvement was actually a huge factor in my wanting to take this gig. I have such respect—perhaps awe is a better term—for the musical history of this series that being able to have the film-scoring equivalent of Yoda be part of it was a massive incentive, and an obvious advantage that I could not let pass. The actual experience of being allowed to see into John's process? I couldn't imagine a greater gift.

— John Powell on agreeing to score Solo.

In July 2017, John Powell was announced as the main composer of the score, and he began writing the music in late-2017 after finishing his work on Ferdinand. In December 2017, longtime Star Wars composer John Williams began working on the film score, in addition to Powell's compositions. Williams wrote two musical pieces: "Han hero" and "Han searching theme," and combined them to create the main theme for Han Solo – "The Adventures of Han". In addition to the theme, he wrote several pieces, but they were not featured in the soundtrack in their entirety. His demos were recorded with the Recording Arts Orchestra of Los Angeles at the Newman Scoring Stage the following month.

Powell started composing the instrumental cues in mid-January 2018. Some of the original tracks he composed include: a romantic theme revolving around Han and Qi'ra; a friendship theme for Han and Chewbacca; another theme for Han's mentor Beckett and his gang; a choral piece for the Marauders; a theme for L3-37, droid companion to Lando Calrissian; and a few other minor motifs. Powell interpolated Williams' new theme into his score, as well as incorporating music by Williams from previous Star Wars films, including the Star Wars main title, and several motifs and cues from A New Hope, The Empire Strikes Back and The Phantom Menace. Powell stated, "I tried to keep in mind the DNA of how John writes, which is flow and polyphony and melody, and of course an incredibly interesting rhythmic use of the orchestra".

Recording of the score began during mid-March at the Abbey Road Studios, with a 98-piece orchestra conducted by Andrew Mackay. Later that following month, he went to Sofia, Bulgaria to record a choral portion with 36 members from the Bulgarian women's choir, as they offered "an aggressive, exotic sound" for the Marauders, in order to feel like a different culture had arrived on the scene. Besides working on the score, Powell wrote and recorded a song that was used as a background lounge piece titled "Chicken in a Pot." The lyrics he wrote were translated into Huttese, a language invented by sound designer Ben Burtt for the original Star Wars trilogy.

== Reception ==
Professional ratings
Review scores
Source	Rating
Filmtracks	5/5 stars
Movie Wave	5/5 stars

Critical response to the soundtrack were positive. Filmitracks.com commented "Solo: A Star Wars Story is not only a masterpiece equal to or exceeding the first two How to Train Your Dragon scores, but it could rank highly on some lists of the best all-time "Star Wars" scores [...] Powell proves here that finding the right balance is not a lost cause. The amount of density in this music is astounding, its detailed counterpoint lines, expert orchestration, and outstanding mix all contributing to an immensely entertaining result. There are simply too many fine touches in this score to do it justice in any review, leaving the music as a top recommendation on album for all film music enthusiasts." The website also published the review for the deluxe edition, and said "an exemplary presentation that provides the full score as a faithful representation of what's heard in the film, even if a few overlays of embellishment remain. The four source-like tracks may have been better placed in a bonus section at the end, but Powell seemed intent on preserving the exact chronological presentation." Movie Wave, wrote "The album goes heavy on action – there is a fair bit of unreleased music in the film and not much of it is action – so perhaps it's a bit unbalanced, but it is just incredibly exciting. The new Williams material is excellent, the way Powell uses it (and the classic themes) truly impressive – and I really rather admire that he went so much his own way with the score [...] The album is a real thrill-ride and will bring repeated massive smiles to the faces of both Star Wars fans and John Powell fans." Zanobard Reviews wrote, Solo: A Star Wars Story is the perfect Star Wars score that fans have been waiting for".

== Track listing ==
Solo: A Star Wars Story (Original Motion Picture Soundtrack)
No.	Title	Music	Length
1.	"The Adventures of Han"	John Williams	3:52
2.	"Meet Han"	John Powell	2:22
3.	"Corellia Chase" (Includes "Star Wars Main Theme" by John Williams)	John Powell	3:36
4.	"Spaceport"	John Powell	4:09
5.	"Flying with Chewie"	John Powell	3:34
6.	"Train Heist" (Includes "Imperial/Stormtrooper Motif" from A New Hope by John Williams)	John Powell	4:51
7.	"Marauders Arrive"	John Powell	5:16
8.	"Chicken in the Pot"	John Powell	2:12
9.	"Is This Seat Taken?"	John Powell	2:39
10.	"L3 & Millennium Falcon" (Includes "Star Wars Main Theme" by John Williams)	John Powell	3:19
11.	"Lando's Closet"	John Powell	2:14
12.	"Mine Mission"	John Powell	4:14
13.	"Break Out" (Includes "Rebel Fanfare" by John Williams)	John Powell	6:18
14.	"The Good Guy"	John Powell	5:28
15.	"Reminiscence Therapy" (Includes "Death Star Motif", "Rebel Fanfare", "TIE Fighter Attack", "The Asteroid Field", and "Star Wars Main Theme" by John Williams)	John Powell	6:14
16.	"Into the Maw" (Includes "Rebel Fanfare" and "Star Wars Main Theme" by John Williams)	John Powell	4:52
17.	"Savareen Stand-Off"	John Powell	4:28
18.	"Good Thing You Were Listening"	John Powell	2:11
19.	"Testing Allegiance"	John Powell	4:23
20.	"Dice & Roll" (Includes "Rebel Fanfare" by John Williams)	John Powell	1:59
Total length:			77:11

== Deluxe edition ==
In September 2020, Powell announced on social media that a deluxe edition of the soundtrack album would be remixed and mastered by 5 Cat Studios, featuring all unedited cues from the score and additional demos that Williams had composed for the film. The deluxe edition was released by Walt Disney Records on November 20, 2020, featuring an additional 40 minutes of previously unreleased music.

Solo: A Star Wars Story (Original Motion Picture Soundtrack/Deluxe Edition)

Film score by John Powell and John Williams
- Released: November 20, 2020
- Studio: 5 Cat Studios
- Genre: Soundtrack
- Length: 2:03:45
- Label: Walt Disney
- Producers: John Powell, Batu Sener

Solo: A Star Wars Story (Original Motion Picture Soundtrack/Deluxe Edition)
No.	Title	Music	Length
1.	"Meet Han (1M1)"	John Powell & John Williams	2:21
2.	"Bunk / Proxima (1M2-3)"	John Powell	3:09
3.	"Corellia Chase (1M4-5)" (includes "Star Wars Main Theme" by John Williams)	John Powell	3:34
4.	"Spaceport (1M6-7)"	John Powell	4:09
5.	"Gonna Be a Pilot (1M8)"	John Williams	0:30
6.	"Empire Recruitment (1M9)" (Includes "The Imperial March" by John Williams, arranged by John Powell)	John Powell & John Williams	0:32
7.	"Mimban Battle (1M10A-B)" (Includes "The Imperial March" by John Williams)	John Powell	2:04
8.	"Blackmail (1M11)"	John Powell	1:32
9.	"The Beast (2M12)"	John Powell	2:36
10.	"Chewie Untamed (2M13)"	John Powell	3:33
11.	"Surveying Conveyex (2M14)"	John Powell	1:01
12.	"Deluxe Train Heist (2M15-16A-B-C)" (Includes "Imperial/Stormtrooper Motif" from A New Hope by John Williams)	John Powell	10:21
13.	"Walk to Dryden's (3M17)"	John Powell	2:14
14.	"Chicken in the Pot (3M18S)" (feat. vocals by Baraka May & Reid Bruton)	John Powell	2:09
15.	"Han & Qi'Ra Reunite (3M19)"	John Powell	1:12
16.	"Stormtrooper JP-054 Karaoke" (feat. vocals by John Powell)	John Powell	2:09
17.	"Dryden's Patience Is Tested (3M21-22-23)"	John Powell	5:30
18.	"Card Room (3M24)"	John Powell	1:09
19.	"Sabacc Game (3M25)"	John Powell	2:35
20.	"L3 & Millennium Falcon (3M26)" (Includes "Star Wars Main Theme" by John Williams)	John Powell	3:17
21.	"Family Stories (4M27)"	John Powell & John Williams	2:00
22.	"Lando's Closet (4M28)"	John Powell	2:11
23.	"Trust No One (4M29)"	John Powell	1:17
24.	"Oksana Floren, yadda yadda yadda (4M30A)"	John Powell	4:28
25.	"Extra Deluxe Mine Mission (4M30B-5M30C-31)" (Includes "Rebel Fanfare" by John Williams)	John Powell	10:23
26.	"Kessel Run in Less Than 12 Parsecs (5M32-33A-B-C)" (Includes "Death Star Motif", "Rebel Fanfare", "TIE Fighter Attack", "The Asteroid Field", and "Star Wars Main Theme" by John Williams)	John Powell & John Williams	11:00
27.	"Savareen Tent (6M34)"	John Powell	2:00
28.	"Enfys' Stand-Off (6M35)"	John Powell	4:25
29.	"Qi'Ra Knows a Bit More Than Han (6M36-37-38)"	John Powell	2:14
30.	"Double-Double Cross (6M39-40)"	John Powell	4:47
31.	"Dryden's Long, Long Fight (6M41-42)"	John Powell	4:51
32.	"Maul's Call / Parting Ways (7M43-44-45)" (Includes "Duel of the Fates" by John Williams)	John Powell & John Williams	5:39
33.	"Lando's Jungle Room (7M46S)"	John Powell	1:03
34.	"Sabacc Rematch / To Tatooine (7M47-48)" (Includes "Rebel Fanfare" by John Williams)	John Powell	1:53
35.	"Super Extra Deluxe End Credits Suite (7MEC)" (Includes "Star Wars Main Theme" and "Rebel Fanfare" by John Williams)	John Powell & John Williams	9:57
Total length:			123:45

== Vinyl release ==
On November 25, 2020, Mondo has announced a four-disc LP album, pressed on 180-grams "hyperspace" and "gram-black" vinyl, featured artwork by César Moreno and additional liner notes. The four-disc set were priced $35.00 and pre-orders for the sets began on December 2, before being published on January 1, 2021. The vinyl discs, contain scores from the original soundtrack, while the additional cues were not featured, though being featured in the deluxe edition of the soundtrack. A press release from Mondo said:

"The origin story of science-fiction's greatest rogue is a Star Wars story through and through: a rollicking adventure, full of humor and suspense - and in the grand tradition of franchise, features an epic sweeping score worthy of the biggest screen (or, in this case, speakers) imaginable. John Williams' new 'The Adventures of Han Theme' kicks things off in a spectacular fashion, setting the tone for a fantastic original score by John Powell, only the third composer to ever tackle the film series in its 40+ year legacy, to enter the Star Wars canon."

== Chart performance ==
Chart (2016–17)	Peak position
Austrian Albums (Ö3 Austria)	41
Belgian Albums (Ultratop Flanders)	41
Belgian Albums (Ultratop Wallonia)	29
Dutch Albums (Album Top 100)	131
French Albums (SNEP)	118
German Albums (Offizielle Top 100)	38
Scottish Albums (Official Charts)	25
Spanish Albums (PROMUSICAE)	11
Swiss Albums (Schweizer Hitparade)	36
UK Albums (Official Charts)	43
UK Soundtrack Albums (OCC)	3
US Billboard 200	190
US Soundtrack Albums (Billboard)	34

== Accolades ==
Award	Date of ceremony	Category	Recipient(s)	Result	Ref.
International Film Music Critics Association Awards	February 21, 2019	Film Music Composition of the Year	John Powell	Won	
Grammy Awards	February 10, 2019	Best Instrumental Composition	John Powell, John Williams ("Mine Mission")	Nominated	
