= How to Train Your Dragon (disambiguation) =

How to Train Your Dragon is an American media franchise from DreamWorks Animation.

How to Train Your Dragon may also refer to:

- How to Train Your Dragon (novel series), a series of children's books written by British author Cressida Cowell
- How to Train Your Dragon (2010 film), a 2010 CGI animated film loosely based on the 2003 book of the same name by Cressida Cowell
  - How to Train Your Dragon (2010 soundtrack), an album composed by John Powell for the 2010 film
  - How to Train Your Dragon (video game), an action-adventure game based upon the 2010 film
- How to Train Your Dragon (2025 film), a 2025 live action remake of the 2010 CGI animated film
  - How to Train Your Dragon (2025 soundtrack), an album composed by John Powell for the 2025 film

== See also ==
- All articles that contain How to Train Your Dragon in running text
