= King Arthur: Legend of the Sword (soundtrack) =

2017 film soundtrackalbum

King Arthur: Legend of the Sword (Original Motion Picture Soundtrack)

Film score by Daniel Pemberton
- Released: 5 May 2017
- Recorded: 2016–2017
- Studios: Abbey Road Studios, London
- Genre: Film score
- Length: 91:04
- Label: WaterTower Music
- Producer: Daniel Pemberton

Daniel Pemberton chronology
Gold (2016)	King Arthur: Legend of the Sword (2017)	Mark Felt: The Man Who Brought Down the White House (2017)

King Arthur: Legend of the Sword (Original Motion Picture Soundtrack) is the film score to the 2017 film King Arthur: Legend of the Sword directed by Guy Ritchie. The original score is composed by Daniel Pemberton and performed by the London Chamber Orchestra, which was recorded at the Abbey Road Studios in London. The score was released through WaterTower Music on 5 May 2017.

== Background ==
Daniel Pemberton, who previously collaborated with Ritchie in The Man from U.N.C.L.E. (2015), had scored music for King Arthur: Legend of the Sword. Pemberton recalled that the world which was set for King Arthur was specifically different, and cannot be fit within a particular genre, this helped him to experiment in various forms of contemporary music. Ritchie suggested Pemberton to provide music that did not sound like traditional film score and also due to the stylized setting, Pemberton was tasked to create a modernized musical landscape for Medieval London.

Pemberton then researched extensively on the sounds of medieval London which took a lot of time on recording, as there was a lot of work with the musicians finding out the possibilities that they can experiment with those instruments which led them to come across several ideas. Pemberton added that King Arthur provided much more scope for experimentation with orchestral music and how sounds can be manipulated, where some of the minor creaks were tuned into a rhythm being performed by a 50-piece orchestra. Though added that such things need a huge attention to detail especially when performing live, Pemberton added on most of the melodic and musical cues were not complex and distilled down to simple ideas, while adding that he wrote few more scores which was easier for the orchestra to play.

Pemberton added that the run-in sequence in Run Londinum was something he associated to be proud of, as he felt the music was such an integral part in that sequence which helped it while watching it visually. The score was recorded at the Abbey Road Studios in London. In a Reddit AMA session, Pemberton stated that the opening and title themes of King Arthur was recorded at an iPhone in a friend's toilet.

== Reception ==
Movie Wave's James Southall summarized that "I’ve been impressed with Daniel Pemberton since he first appeared on the scene. He has been busy writing pretty characteristic scores which don’t generally sound like the standard modern things, and it’s refreshing. King Arthur: Legend of the Sword is not anywhere near as instantly gratifying as the composer’s best, but it’s surprisingly deep and even if you don’t end up playing it particularly frequently (and I can’t believe I will), it’s an impressively different piece of work. I don’t suppose Pemberton will score Guy Ritchie’s next film – the latest unnecessary Disney live-action remake, this time of Aladdin – but let’s hope this collaboration does continue in future, because its first two entries show a lot of promise." Anton Smit of Soundtrack World wrote "A good score really enhanced the movie experience, like Daniel Pemberton enhanced the movie with his sounds in his own unique way for King Arthur: Legend of the Sword."

Mike Mazzanti of The Film Stage called it "a rip-roaring score by Daniel Pemberton that gets the blood pumping". Alonso Duralde of TheWrap called it an "emphatically percussive score". Tim Grierson of Screen International wrote "Composer Daniel Pemberton complements Ritchie’s knowing visual excess, crafting a pounding, grandiose score that, on occasion, is literally breathless. During certain high-intensity moments, Pemberton supplements the percussive instruments with his own heavy, syncopated breathing. Like the movie itself, the technique is ridiculously exaggerated but moderately diverting — until, in typical Ritchie fashion, it wears out its welcome through overuse." Jack Pooley of WhatCulture wrote "Pemberton makes fantastic use of drums and heavy breathing to generate an exciting soundscape on which Ritchie can stage his absurd set-pieces, and it wouldn't be surprising if, for many, Pemberton's work ends up being their favourite part of the entire movie."

David Ehrlich of IndieWire called it a "beautiful and blisteringly percussive score". Matt Rooney of Collider wrote "Daniel Pemberton’s score is the true star of Legend of the Sword. Even among all the impressive visuals and fine performances, the visceral, raw, breathtaking music blows past them all with a cacophony of sounds and influences that probably shouldn’t work together but 100 percent does. Whether it’s the use of medieval instruments of all shapes and sizes to the guttural breaths and screams that lends a welcome dose of physicality for the faster-paced scenes, the level of personality Pemberton injects into the score to make Legend of the Sword sound unlike anything in the genre is worthy of endless praise." Alan Jones of Radio Times wrote "Daniel Pemberton’s propulsive score adds further layers of richness to the whole gritty and glittering endeavour." Robbie Collin of The Daily Telegraph wrote "Daniel Pemberton’s skirling score, give the combat a teeth-baring energy that’s otherwise unearned".

== Track listing ==
No.	Title	Length
1.	"From Nothing Comes a King"	0:43
2.	"King Arthur: Legend of the Sword"	2:52
3.	"Growing Up Londinium"	2:41
4.	"Jackseye's Tale"	3:31
5.	"The Story of Mordred"	2:00
6.	"Vortigen and the Syrens"	2:18
7.	"The Legend of Excalibur"	2:43
8.	"Seasoned Oak"	2:18
9.	"The Vikings & the Barons"	2:59
10.	"The Politics & the Life"	3:22
11.	"Tower & Power"	3:52
12.	"The Born King"	2:30
13.	"Assassins Breathe"	4:23
14.	"Run Londinium"	5:45
15.	"Fireball"	2:03
16.	"Journey to the Caves"	1:56
17.	"The Wolf & the Hanged Men"	2:28
18.	"Camelot In Flames"	2:24
19.	"The Lady In the Lake"	3:07
20.	"The Darklands"	2:43
21.	"Revelation"	3:05
22.	"King Arthur: Destiny of the Sword"	2:42
23.	"The Power of Excalibur"	4:03
24.	"Knights of the Round Table"	3:30
25.	"King Arthur: The Coronation"	1:45
26.	"The Devil & the Huntsman"	4:18
27.	"The Ballad of Londinium"	2:49
28.	"Riot & Flames"	1:59
29.	"Anger"	1:54
30.	"Cave Fight"	1:25
31.	"Confrontation with the Common Man"	2:31
32.	"The Devil & the Daughter"	4:25
Total length:		91:04

== Personnel ==
Credits adapted from WaterTower Music:

- Music composer and producer – Daniel Pemberton
- Engineer – George Oulton, Matt Mysko, Paul Pritchard
- Recording and mixing – Sam Okell
- Mastering – Christian Wright
- Music editor – Ben Smithers, Simon Changer
- Music supervisor – Karen Elliott
- Music consultant – Sam Lee
- Music librarian – Jill Streater
- Score coordinator – Gareth Griffiths
- Art direction – Sandeep Sriram
- Executive producer – Guy Ritchie, Lionel Wigram
- Executive in charge of music For Warner Bros. Pictures – Niki Sherrod
- Executive in charge of WaterTower Music – Jason Linn

Orchestra and choir

- Orchestra – Chamber Orchestra Of London
- Orchestrators – Andrew Skeet, Ben Foskett
- Conductor – Alastair King, Geoff Alexander
- Choir – RSVP Singers
- Ancient ensemble – Clare Salaman, Pavlo Besnoziuk, Peter McCarthy, Sonia Slany, Susanna Pell

Instruments

- Bass – Jon Noyce, Adem Ilhan
- Cowbell– Lily Alabama Herbert
- Drums – Ian Thomas
- Guitar – Daniel Pemberton, Leo Abrahams, Robin Joffrey
- Horns – Nicholas Perry
- Hurdy gurdy – Steve Tyler
- Percussion, stones, chopsticks – Paul Clarvis, Rob Farrer
- Tromba marina, nyckelharpa, hardanger, vielle – Clare Salaman
- Violin – Emma Smith

== Accolades ==
Awards	Date of ceremony	Category	Recipient(s)	Result	Ref.
International Film Music Critics Association	February 22, 2018	Film Music Composition of the Year	Daniel Pemberton	Nominated	
International Film Music Critics Association	February 22, 2018	Best Original Score for an Action/Adventure/Thriller Film	Daniel Pemberton – ("Growing Up in Londinium")	Nominated	
Golden Reel Awards	February 18, 2018	Outstanding Achievement in Sound Editing – Music Score	Simon Changer (supervising music editor); Ben Smithers (music editor)	Nominated	
