= How to Train Your Dragon: The Hidden World (soundtrack) =

2019 soundtrack album

How to Train Your Dragon: The Hidden World (Original Motion Picture Soundtrack)

Film score by John Powell
- Released: February 1, 2019; April 25, 2024 (deluxe edition)
- Recorded: October 2018–January 2019
- Studios: Abbey Road Studios, London; 5 Cat Studios, Los Angeles
- Genre: Film score
- Length: 1:15:51; 1:56:40 (deluxe edition)
- Label: Back Lot Music
- Producer: John Powell

John Powell chronology
Solo: A Star Wars Story (2018)	How to Train Your Dragon: The Hidden World (2019)	The Call of the Wild (2020)

Singles from How to Train Your Dragon: The Hidden World (Original Motion Picture Soundtrack)
- 1. "Together From Afar" Released: January 31, 2019

How to Train Your Dragon: The Hidden World (Original Motion Picture Soundtrack) is the score album to the 2019 film How to Train Your Dragon: The Hidden World, the sequel to How to Train Your Dragon 2 (2014) and the third and final installment in the How to Train Your Dragon trilogy. Recurring DreamWorks composer John Powell, who scored for the previous two installments of the series, returned for the third film. The album features an original song, "Together from Afar" performed by Jónsi, which was released as a single on January 31, 2019. The album was released on February 1 by Back Lot Music, and was met with a positive response from music critics.

== Development ==
"Music does half of the storytelling and in the case of John Powell, a storyteller in his own right, he is a partner from the beginning. He finds themes that I might not even be consciously aware of and brings them to the surface."

— Dean DeBlois, on the music of The Hidden World

Unlike the first two films in the franchise, the score for Hidden World has a "dark theme" for the main antagonist, dragon-hunter Grimmel, a "fate" riff, which signalled changes in the lives of key characters, lighthearted romantic music for Toothless and the potential mate, as well as "mystical, ethereal sounds for that "hidden world" of the dragons themselves". Powell felt that for the film, he had to come to the studio at five-o-clock in the morning and write the score at closed doors, as "he had to go to these slightly indulgent, dark, sad places to find things that might be potent for other people".

He also brought his earlier themes, and also reproduced them to create newer versions and integrate it in the film, as "if he had kept using material that everybody knew all the way through the movie, you wouldn't have felt it as significantly as you do at the end". He produced a varied soundscape, including playful sounds for dragon romps, orchestral sounds for the battle sequences, string march for the Vikings' exodus, a celebratory song ("Together From Afar") in the conclusion, as well as unusual instrumental colors to convey the ancient world. He made use of multiple instruments such as Celtic harp, bodhrán frame drum, uilleann pipes, traditional Scottish bagpipes, and backing vocals which were provided by Jónsi (who provided for the music of How to Train Your Dragon 2). He also recorded the original song "Together From Afar".

Jónsi was in town, so John set him up with a laptop and a microphone and had him focus on the Hidden World. When we first enter that space it's all very mysterious and forbidding. Jónsi spent the day working with layers of his own voice. John then incorporated that into the tease and then finally the full-blown, majestic Hidden World theme. When I heard it, I remember thinking, 'Wow.'

— DeBlois on the composition of the title theme

Powell added that, one of the challenging sequence was when Toothless woos the mysterious Light Fury on a beach, where he came with a "delicate melody with a dance-like rhythm" which he expanded into a seven-minute cue using the classical form of passacaglia. He called it as "one of several special moments that are music-driven, without dialogue".

== Recording ==
The score was recorded at the Abbey Road Studios in London in October 2018. Unlike his previous films, John used a full orchestra for this film, which consisted of 98 musicians, eight ethnic-music soloists and a 60-member vocal choir. Grammy-winning choral composer-arranger Eric Whitacre, whom Powell worked on Kung Fu Panda (2008), conducted the choir in various texts and translated them into Gaelic and Latin. The film's director Dean DeBlois and Cressida Cowell, the author of the children's book series whose writings and illustrations inspired the films, and also worked on the film adaptations as an executive producer, supervised the recording sessions. The one hour and thirty three-minute long music was recorded within nine days.

== Track listing ==
All music is composed by John Powell.

No.	Title	Length
1.	"Raiders Return to Busy, Busy Berk"	5:27
2.	"Dinner Talk – Grimmel's Introduction"	3:53
3.	"Legend Has It – Cliffside Playtime"	4:21
4.	"Toothless: Smitten"	3:16
5.	"Worst Pep Talk Ever"	2:40
6.	"Night Fury Killer"	3:36
7.	"Exodus!"	4:38
8.	"Third Date"	6:49
9.	"New New Tail"	1:28
10.	"Furies in Love"	3:03
11.	"Killer Dragons"	5:05
12.	"With Love Comes a Great Waterfall"	2:08
13.	"The Hidden World"	5:16
14.	"Armada Battle"	8:40
15.	"As Long as He's Safe"	6:29
16.	"Once There Were Dragons"	5:45
17.	"Together from Afar" (Jónsi)	3:17
Total length:		75:51

=== Deluxe edition ===
All music is composed by John Powell.

Disc 1
No.	Title	Length
1.	"Rescue Mission - Busy Busy Berk (1m1-2a-b)"	7:25
2.	"Marry Her – Grimmel's Terms (1m2c-3)"	3:55
3.	"Legend Has It (1m4)"	4:33
4.	"Mysterious Creature (2m5)"	2:19
5.	"Toothless in Love (2m6a)"	1:04
6.	"Dart Trap (2m6b)"	2:45
7.	"Grimmel Visit-First Fight (2m7a-b)"	3:37
8.	"Town Hall Speech-Exodus (2m8a-b)"	4:39
9.	"Setting Up Camp (2m9a)"	1:02
10.	"Valka's Warning (2m9b)"	1:09
11.	"Forbidden Courtship (3m10)"	6:49
12.	"Toothless Flies Alone (3m11)"	1:27
13.	"Near Miss Valka (3m12a)"	0:46
14.	"Romance in the Clouds (3m12b)"	3:05
15.	"New Berk Feast (3m13s)"	1:27
16.	"Ambush-Cage Fight (3m14a-b)"	5:07

All music is composed by John Powell.

Disc 2
No.	Title	Length
17.	"Stronger Together (4m15a)"	1:04
18.	"New Island (4m15b)"	0:41
19.	"Into the Hole (4m16a)"	1:06
20.	"The Hidden World (4m16b)" (Jónsi)	5:15
21.	"With Love Comes Loss (4m17)"	1:07
22.	"Grimmel's Surprise (4m18)"	3:39
23.	"The Hiccup I Know-Armada Battle (5m19-20)"	9:28
24.	"Ultimate Sacrifice-Freedom (5m21-22)"	6:28
25.	"Viking Wedding-Boat Epilogue (5m23-24)"	5:41
26.	"Together from Afar (6m24s)" (Jónsi)	3:16
27.	"The Hidden World Suite (6m25)"	6:40

All music is composed by John Powell.

Bonus tracks
No.	Title	Length
28.	"Busy Busy Berk (1m2a-b) [Bonus Track: Demo]"	3:12
29.	"Legend Has It (1m4) [Bonus Track: Demo]"	4:30
30.	"Forbidden Courtship (3m10) [Bonus Track: Demo]"	6:49
31.	"Toothless Flies Alone (3m11) [Bonus Track: Demo]"	1:26
32.	"Romance in the Clouds (3m12b) [Bonus Track: Demo]"	3:05
33.	"Viking Wedding (5m23) [Bonus Track: Demo]"	1:54
Total length:		1:56:40

== Reception ==
=== Critical response ===
Zanobard Reviews gave 9/10 to the score and wrote "John Powell's score to How To Train Your Dragon: The Hidden World is just marvelous. He introduces a number of amazing new themes as well as bringing back all your favourites from the previous movies, and intertwines them expertly with his frankly ridiculously over-the-top action scoring (but that's why we love it). The album not only serves as a very solid third entry to the musical franchise but also as an epic and absolutely brilliant conclusion to his masterful trilogy. The first film's score still just edges this one, but it's got the second movie beaten, that's for sure. It's a superb soundtrack, and one that was most definitely worth the wait."

Critic Jonathan Broxton wrote "John Powell has created what might be his defining film music legacy. Of course he's still young, and so he still has plenty of time to write something that will top it; also, for the sake of argument, some people may say that his music for the Bourne films is just as influential. The entire How to Train Your Dragon series is a bonafide masterpiece, a gloriously bold and colorful fantasy of Viking life, heroes and dragons, honor and friendship and grand adventure. Everything points to How to Train Your Dragon: The Hidden World being the last film in this series and, if so, Powell has ended on a high. It won't get an Oscar nomination, because sequels like this never do, but this will still be riding high as one of the scores of the year."

Filmtracks.com wrote "Powell does not introduce new themes for these concepts explicitly, but he does offer a wide enough breadth of fresh identities to accompany their general purposes. The dragons' themes have been condensed into several motifs to represent the two leads of their kind, the Berk theme is displaced by a new one for another island, the flying and friendship themes are supplanted by new heroic alternatives, and other major new locations and characters are afforded appropriate ideas of their own. The inclusion of a theme and submotif for fate ties all of them together by the end." James Southall of Movie Wave wrote "With the first score having come in the first year of the 2010s and the final one in the last, this trilogy of music frames a decade of film music in which it has played a very notable part. While perhaps this third instalment doesn't quite have a track to rival "Test Drive" or "Flying with Mother" ("Armada Battle" and "Once There Were Dragons" do come close) it is still for the most part of the highest quality and shows off again what a fine composer John Powell is. The films obviously held special meaning for him and his family and his emotion shines through all through it."

=== Accolades ===
Award	Date of ceremony	Category	Recipient(s)	Result	Ref.
Hollywood Music in Media Awards	November 20, 2019	Original Score – Animated Film	John Powell	Won	
Hollywood Music in Media Awards	November 20, 2019	Original Song – Animated Film	John Powell and Jónsi for "Together From Afar"	Nominated	
International Film Music Critics Association Awards	February 20, 2020	Best Original Score for an Animated Film	John Powell	Nominated	
Society of Composers & Lyricists Awards	January 7, 2020	Outstanding Original Score for a Studio Film	John Powell	Nominated	
World Soundtrack Awards	October 18, 2019	Best Original Score of the Year	John Powell	Nominated	
World Soundtrack Awards	October 18, 2019	Public Choice Award	John Powell	Won	

== Piano solos ==
On May 15, 2020, Powell released an album titled Piano Solos from How to Train Your Dragon: The Hidden World, through his own record label. The album features nine tracks from Powell's original score, arranged for solo piano and performed by Powell's frequent collaborator Batu Sener. The arrangements from this album are printed and distributed by Hal Leonard Publishing Company.

=== Track listing ===
No.	Title	Length
1.	"Legend Has It – Cliffside Playtime"	4:36
2.	"Toothless: Smitten"	3:09
3.	"Exodus!"	4:42
4.	"Third Date"	1:23
5.	"New New Tail"	1:27
6.	"Furies in Love"	3:24
7.	"With Love Comes Loss"	1:10
8.	"The Hidden World"	2:07
9.	"Once There Were Dragons"	6:03
Total length:		28:05

== Personnel ==
Credits adapted from CD liner notes.

- Music By – John Powell
- Additional music and arrangements – Anthony Willis, Batu Sener, Paul Mounsey
- Programming – Satnam Ramgotra
- Recording – Erik Swanson, Nick Wollage
- Engineer – Lewis Jones
- Mixing – Shawn Murphy, John Traunwieser
- Mastering – Patricia Sullivan
- Music editor – Jack Dolman, David Channing
- Music preparation – Gregory Jamrok, Mark Graham
- Gaelic advisor – Julie Fowlis

Instruments

- Bagpipes – Red Hot Chilli Pipers
- Bassoon – Gavin McNaughton, Rachel Simms, Daniel Jemison
- Bodhrán – Kieran Leonard
- Clarinet – Anthony Pike, David Fuest, Nick Rodwell
- Flute – Anna Noakes, Helen Keen, Karen Jones
- French Horn – Corinne Bailey, David Pyatt, Laurence Davies, Mike Thmpson, Nick Hougham, Phil Woods, Phillip Eastop, Richard Berry, Simon Rayner, Richard Watkins
- Harp – Helen Tunstall, Skaila Kanga, Maeve Gilchrist
- Oboe – Jane Marshall, Janey Miller, John Anderson
- Percussion – Chris Baron, Dave Elliott, Gary Kettel, Glyn Matthews, Paul Clarvis, Frank Ricotti
- Piano, Celesta – Dave Hartley
- Solo vocal – Dee Lewis Clay, Jónsi
- Timpani – Jeremy Cornes, Bill Lockhart
- Trombone – Amos Miller, Ed Tarrant, Lyndon Meredith, Andy Wood
- Trumpet – Andy Crowley, Dan Newell, Kate Moore, Simon Munday, Philip Cobb
- Tuba – Owen Slade
- Uilleann pipes – Callum Stewart
- Violin – Alison Harling, Alison Kelly, Bea Lovejoy, Boguslaw Kostecki, Cathy Thompson, Charlie Brown, Chris Tombling, Christina Emmanuel, Dai Emanuel, Daniel Bhattacharya, Dave Woodcock, Debbie Widdup, Elizabeth Cooney, Everton Nelson, Fiona Brett, Ian Humphries, Jackie Shave, Jackie Hartley, Jeremy Isaac, Jim McLeod, Jo Archard, John Mills, Laura Melhuish, Maciej Rakowski, Mark Berrow, Natalia Bonner, Patrick Kiernan, Philippa Ibbotson, Rita Manning, Sarah Sexton, Tom Pigott-Smith, Warren Zielinski, Perry Montague-Mason
- Woodwind – Jan Hendrickse

Choir

- Choir – Eric Whitacre Singers
- Choir recording – Pete Cobbin
- Choir conductor – Eric Whitacre

Orchestra

- Orchestration – Andrew Kinney, Geoff Lawson, Jon Kull, Randy Kerber, Rick Giovinazzo, Tommy Laurence
- Supervising orchestration – John Ashton Thomas
- Orchestra leader – Emlyn Singleton
- Orchestra conductor – Gavin Greenaway
- Orchestra contractor – Susie Gillis
