= Minions & Monsters (soundtrack) =

2026 soundtrack album by John Powell

Minions & Monsters (Original Motion Picture Soundtrack)

Soundtrack album by John Powell
- Released: July 1, 2026
- Recorded: April 2026
- Studios: Barbra Streisand Scoring Stage, Sony Pictures Studios; Eastwood Scoring Stage, Warner Bros. Studios Burbank
- Genre: Film score
- Length: 78:58
- Label: Back Lot
- Producer: John Powell

John Powell chronology
Wicked: For Good (2025)	Minions & Monsters (2026)

Minions & Monsters (Original Motion Picture Soundtrack) is the soundtrack album for the 2026 film of the same name, directed by Pierre Coffin and produced by Illumination. The score was composed by John Powell, marking his third collaboration with Illumination following The Lorax (2012) and Migration (2023), and is the first installment in the Despicable Me franchise to not be composed by recurring composer Heitor Pereira. The soundtrack was released on July 1, 2026, by Back Lot Music.

== Background ==
John Powell was confirmed to score Minions & Monsters on April 17, 2026, marking his third collaboration with Illumination following The Lorax (2012) and Migration (2023), and the first installment in the Despicable Me franchise not to be scored by recurring composer Heitor Pereira.

In an interview with Borys Kit of The Hollywood Reporter, Powell stated that of the pivotal minute, it is "a very dangerous moment," and that "it can go so horribly wrong." Director Pierre Coffin had reached out to Powell, to which he stated during the interview: "I said to him, 'OK, it's probably time you come and listen to some things.' And that moment is the difference between talking about music and then listening to music." He recalled the scoring as "Overly emotional, overwrought, overplayed, overwritten. Just over. Everything was over. It helps elicits laughs [but] would be very dangerous if I was doing a serious film."

The recording of the film score consisted of 80 musicians, with around 30 violinists along with 25 brass players in extra, and a 60-member vocal choir performing the score during the three-week timeframe. As most of the music sessions in film scoring, moved out of America owing to tax credits and other economic factors, Powell noted that the score would be recorded in Los Angeles as he felt talented musicians can be found in one place, and eventually thanked all the musicians during the last day of recording as a mark of gratitude.

The score for Minions & Monsters was recorded at the Barbra Streisand Scoring Stage at Sony Pictures Studios in Culver City, California, and at the Eastwood Scoring Stage at the Warner Bros. Studios in Burbank, California.

== Release ==
Minions & Monsters (Original Motion Picture Soundtrack) was released through Back Lot Music on July 1, 2026, the same day as the film's release. The album would be also released in double LP through Music on Vinyl.

== Reception ==
Zanobard Reviews rated 7.5 out of 10 and wrote "John Powell's Minions & Monsters is a loving and meticulously-crafted musical tribute to the Golden Age Of Hollywood, with apt thematic chaos for the Minions and a thousand seamless transitions between utterly gorgeous orchestral and vocal styles making it so worth a listen." Jason Pirodsky of The Prague Reporter wrote "John Powell's score gives the proceedings an added propulsion, while the animation repeatedly finds inventive ways to stage silent-era pastiche alongside modern blockbuster spectacle". Barry Levitt of Time described it "a great original score from John Powell".

The track "Radio Newsreel" was nominated for Best Arrangement, Instrumental or A Cappella at the 69th Annual Grammy Awards.

== Track listing ==
All tracks are written by John Powell.

No.	Title	Length
1.	"The Beginnings of the Mooovies"	1:10
2.	"To the Land of the Cyclop"	4:13
3.	"James & Henry"	1:47
4.	"A Wizard and The Bunny"	2:12
5.	"Big Boss Montage"	3:27
6.	"Cowboys, Cops and Cahuenga"	2:43
7.	"A Train Through Hollywood"	2:49
8.	"Silent Movies"	1:16
9.	"As Minions Go By"	1:52
10.	"Limos, Soundstages and Vikings"	4:15
11.	"Radio Newsreel"	1:58
12.	"James In Action"	1:36
13.	"Shooting with Sound"	1:35
14.	"You'll Never Get an Oscar!"	3:13
15.	"Creative Differences"	1:45
16.	"Cameras and Robot Suits"	4:16
17.	"Goomie and Dort's Apartment"	4:23
18.	"Filet Minions"	1:21
19.	"Dort Meets Debbie"	3:22
20.	"The Island of Howard & Phillips"	2:29
21.	"Everyone Goes On A Date"	1:23
22.	"Sneaking onto the Lot"	2:34
23.	"Building James' Movie Set"	2:28
24.	"The Ecstacy of Eyereen"	3:04
25.	"A Big Orange Blob Eats Hollywood"	3:35
26.	"Keep A Eye Out for the Counterattack"	3:18
27.	"We Have Minions!"	1:49
28.	"Undos and Premieres"	3:18
29.	"Hooray for Hollywood"	0:46
30.	"This Probably Won't Make Much Sense Without the Picture?"	3:35
31.	"Bananaria: What to Eat?"	1:35
Total length:		78:58

== Personnel ==
Credits adapted from Film Music Reporter:

- Music composer and producer: John Powell
- Music editor: Bill Bernstein
- Additional music and arrangements: Batu Sener, Markus Siegel, Alec Lubin, and Paul Mounsey
- Supervising orchestrators: Jonathan Beard, Edward Trybek, and Henri Wilkinson
- Additional orchestrators: Benjamin Hoff, Sean Barrett, and Jamie Thierman
- Orchestra conductor: Anthony Parnther
- Additional orchestra conductor: Vincent Oppido
- Choir conductor: John Powell
- Concertmaster: Bruce Dukov
- Recording engineer: Shawn Murphy
- Mixing engineer: John Michael Caldwell
- Mix assistant: Laura Agudelo Cuartas
- Score editor: David Channing
- Choir contractor: Holly Sedillos
- Orchestra contractors: Gina Zimmitti and Whitney Martin
- Score recordist: Erik Swanson
- Additional score recordist: Chandler Harrod
- Music preparation: Jordan Cox, James Regan, Brad Ritchie, David Neville, Aidan Davis, Kelly Picton, Owen Grey, Connor Low, and Megan Lewandowski
- Sony Pictures Studios Stage crew: Keith Ukrisna, Greg Dennen, Ryan Nelson, Assen Stoyanov, and Julianne McCormack
- Eastwood Scoring Stage crew: Thomas Hardisty, Richard Wheeler, Jr., Peter Nelson, Brian Bair, and Jamie Olvera

=== Score instrumentalists ===
- Violins: Adam Millstein, Aiko Jimena Richter, Alyssa Park, Ana Landauer, Beau Henson, Ben Jacobson, Camille Miller, Carrie Kennedy, Charlie Bisharat, Cherly Norman-Brick, Dennis Kim, Gallia Kastner, Grace Oh, Heather Powell, Ina Veli, Irina Voloshina, Jennifer Choi Fischer, Jessica Guideri, Joel Pargman, Josefina Vergara, Kevin Kumar, Kyle Gilner, Luanne Homzy, Lucia Micarelli, Mala Jasper White, Marisa Kuney, Mark Robertson, Maya Magub, Michael Siess, Misha Vayman, Mona Tian, Natalie Leggett, Neel Hammond, Nina Evtuhov, Roger Wilkie, Sandy Cameron, Sarah Thornblade, Shalini Vijayan, Songa Lee, Tamara Hatwan, Tereza Stanislav
- Violas: Alma Fernandez, Andrew Duckles, Carson Rick, Cassandra Lynne Richburg, Colleen Sugata, David Walther, Erik Rynearson, Evan Antes, Jonah Sirota, Jonathan Moerschel, Linnea Powell, Luke Maurer, Matthew Funes, Meredith Crawford, Robert Brophy, Shawn Mann, Stefan Smith
- Cellos: Allan Hon, Benjamin Lash, Caleb Vaughn-Jones, Cameron Stone, Charles Tyler, Christopher Ahn, Dennis Karmazyn, Eric Byers, Giovanna Clayton, Hillary Smith, Ismael Guerrero Bombut, Jacob Braun, Leah Hansen, Mia Barcia Colombo, Niall Taro Ferguson, Ross Gasworth, Vanessa Freebairn-Smith
- Basses: Christian Kollgaard, Ed Meares, Geoffrey Osika, Marlon Martinez, Michael Valerio, Nathan Farrington, Oscar Hidalgo, Stephen Dress
- Flutes: Amy Tatum, Ben Smolen, Jenni Olson, Johanna Borenstein
- Oboes: Jennifer Cullinan, Jessica Pearlman, Lara Wickes, Lelie Resnick
- Clarinets: Jonathan Sacdalan, and Sierra Allen
- Bassoons: Alex Rosales Garcia, Andrew Brady, Jonathan Stehney, Rose Corrigan, William May
- Saxophones: Chad Smith, Jacob Scesney, Pat Posey, and Rusty Higgins
- Harps: Koni Choi, Marcia Dickenstein
- French horns: Adedeji Ogunfolu, Adrian Dunker, Allen Fogle, David Cooper, Dylan Hart, Elizabeth Linares Montero, Emily Pesavento, Laura Brenes, Lisa McCormick, Melia Badalian, Mike McCoy, Rachel Lauson, Stephanie Thomas, Teag Reaves
- Trumpets: Daniel Fornero, Daniel Rosenboom, Harry Kim, Michael Stever, Rob Schoer, Wayne Bergeron
- Trombones: Alex Iles, David Rejano Cantero, Ido Meshulam, Nicholas Daley, Ryan Dragon, Steve Holtman, Tiffany Johns, Todd Eames
- Tuba: Douglas Tornquist
- Xylophone: Wade Culbreath
- Timpani: Joseph Pereira
- Percussions: Brian Kilgore, John Wakefield, Kenneth McGrath, Luis Conte, Matthew Howard, Petri Korpelo, Robert Slack, Ted Atkatz
- Drum kit: Peter Erskine
- Pianos, celeste and harpsichords: Adam Bravo, Doug Petty, Irene Kim
- Banjos, balalaikas and bouzoukis: Andrew Synowiec, George Doering
- Upright bass: Marlon Martinez
- Harmonica: Ross Garren

=== Score vocalists ===
- Sopranos: Allie Feder, Alina Roitstein, Anna Crumley, Anna Schubert, Andrea Zomorodian, Beth Peregrine, Claire Seely Fedoruk, Courtney Taylor, Devon Davidson, Diane Freiman Reynolds, Elissa Johnston, Graycen Gardner, Holly Sedillos, Kathryn Shuman, Kelci Hahn, Malia Vaught, Natalie Babbit, Nayanna Holley, Suzanne Waters, Taylor Chloé
- Solo soprano: Holly Sedillos
- Altos: Ann Marie Sheridan, Anna Crumley, Ayo Awosika, Callista Hoffman-Campbell, Carrah Stamatakis, Danielle Withers-Clark, Edie Lehmann Boddicker, Elyse Willis, Emily Goglia, Jessica Rotter Murphy, Kimberly Switzer, Laura Flores Jackman, Lindsay Patterson Abdou, Natalie Gonzales Dubois, Sara Mann Baraka May, Sarah Lynch, Shabnam Kalbasi, Sharon Chohi Kim, Valerie Tambaoan
- Basses: Abdiel Gonzalez, Adrien Redford, Alvin Chea, Anthony Panther, David A. Castillo, David Michael Loucks, Gregory Fletcher, James Hayden, Jamal Moore, Luc Kleiner, Reid Bruton, Scott T. Graff, William Kenneth Goldman
- Tenors: Adam Faruqi, Charlie Kim, Charles Lane, Chris Mann, Dermont Kiernan, Edmond Rodriguez, Fletcher Sheridan, Greg Whipple, Jasper Randall, JJ Lopez, Michael Jones, Michael Lichtenauer, R. Matthew Brown, Todd Strange
