= City of Walls =

Studio album by Paul Mounsey
- Released: 2003
- Genre: Scottish folk Contemporary pop

Paul Mounsey chronology
Nahoo 3 - Notes from the Republic (1999)	City of Walls (2003)	Tha Na Laithean a' Dol Seachad (The Days Flash Past) (November 2005)

City of Walls is the fourth album by Scottish musician Paul Mounsey released in 2003 (see 2003 in music).

== Track listing ==
1. "City of Walls"
2. "Since..."
3. "Dunfermline"
4. "Heaven's Full"
5. "Work Song"
6. "Billy's Birl"
7. "The Bridge"
8. "Gad Ionndrainn"
9. "A Ferro E Fogo"
10. "Nothing to Lose"
11. "A Child"
12. "Taking Back the Land"
13. "Nineteen Trees"
14. "Annie"
