= Migration (soundtrack) =

Migration (Original Motion Picture Soundtrack)

Soundtrack album by John Powell
- Released: December 15, 2023
- Studios: AIR Lyndhurst Studios; Skywalker Sound
- Genre: Film score
- Length: 1:12:24
- Label: Back Lot Music
- Producer: John Powell

John Powell chronology
Still: A Michael J. Fox Movie (Soundtrack From The Apple Original Film) (2023)	Migration (Original Motion Picture Soundtrack) (2023)	Thelma The Unicorn (Soundtrack from the Netflix Film) (2024)

Migration (Original Motion Picture Soundtrack) is the soundtrack album to the 2023 Illumination film Migration. The original score was composed by John Powell, marking his second collaboration with Illumination following The Lorax (2012). Director Benjamin Renner wanted a creative and fun score for the film. Powell heavily used string instruments and human vocals in the score and tried emulating 1960s music. He was tasked with creating a theme for the main character, Mack, that showed his growth over the course of the story. For New York City, Powell used unusual instruments to give it an alien-like atmosphere.

The album also features a cover of Destiny's Child's 2001 single "Survivor" performed by Mon Laferte, and was released for digital download and streaming on December 15, 2023, by Back Lot Music.

== Background and production ==
On June 18, 2023, it was announced that John Powell would compose Migration's score, marking his second collaboration with Illumination following The Lorax (2012). Renner wanted a score that had "a level of unusual creativity" and fun. The score uses a lot of string instruments and human vocals. Powell tried emulating 1960s music, in which there were a lot of vocals, and Renner responded positively. He also felt that he may have gotten the gig after expressing his admiration of Sergei Prokofiev's Peter and the Wolf (1936) to the director.

Powell created themes that matched the mentality of the characters in the film. Mack's theme was one of the first pieces he worked on. For the character, he was tasked with crafting a theme of a reluctant hero that evolves throughout his journey. Unlike most hero themes, Powell wrote one that "went down" and "didn't go anywhere." Pam's theme was the opposite and "was always opening up and reaching," reflecting her character. As the journey in the film progresses, Mack's theme becomes bigger and grander, reflecting his growth, and by the time they reach Jamaica, it becomes a standard hero theme. In Peter and the Wolf, the duck is represented by an oboe. The team was heavily inspired by the piece and made reference to it in the score, particularly in portraying Mack's anxiety.

As the characters approach New York City, the score becomes more mysterious, setting the tone of an alien world. To create the chaotic and dangerous atmosphere of the city, Powell used a lot of strange noises. For the theme of Chump, the leader of a pigeon gang in the city, he used a kora. As no humans speak in the film, Powell had to create a musical voice for the human chef. Renner described the character as alien and animal, so Powell tried to capture the feeling of a predator. He said, "I just treated it as if it was sort of an action movie and there was a very dangerous animal prowling around." One of the most challenging, but biggest highlights of the production for the composer, was capturing the feeling of flight. He sought to make the audience feel the character's "elation" and the "ecstatic feeling that they get from flight." To do this, he tried to capture how he and humans in general feel about the idea of flight.

This is the first Illumination film to not have its score recorded in Los Angeles. Instead, the score was recorded at AIR Lyndhurst Studios in London.

== Reception ==
Pete Hammond of Deadline Hollywood wrote that the score "augments the action nicely". Daniel Howat of Next Best Picture wrote "John Powell brings a special score to the film, full of vocalizations and silly twists that elevate the soundscape of Migration." Ayla Ruby of The Cosmic Circus wrote "The score that John Powell has done to accompany Migration is simply perfect. It's a mix of orchestral, gorgeous strings, and vocal notes that complement the story in the best way. The music makes you feel like you're flying."

== Track listing ==
All music is composed by John Powell, except as noted.

Migration (Original Motion Picture Soundtrack) track listing
No.	Title	Artist(s)	Length
1.	"Bedtime Story"		1:46
2.	"What Else Is Out There?"		1:50
3.	"The Flock Arrives"		1:00
4.	"Join Our Migration"		3:30
5.	"Open Your Eyes"		1:27
6.	"Uncle Dan"		1:57
7.	"Let's Fly"		1:51
8.	"Heron Adventures"		5:35
9.	"Night Time, Day Time"		3:07
10.	"Fog World"		1:36
11.	"Central Park"		3:05
12.	"Chump"		1:25
13.	"Follow Me, But Not Too Close"		2:58
14.	"Meet Delroy"		3:15
15.	"Kitchen Key Caper"		2:55
16.	"Survivor (Film Version)"	Powell, Mon Laferte	1:45
17.	"He's Coming!"		1:58
18.	"The Key to Regurgitation"		2:13
19.	"Migration Continues"		1:50
20.	"Eye of Doga"		1:50
21.	"Duck Heaven"		1:52
22.	"Chef at Farm"		3:55
23.	"You Need a Hug"		1:48
24.	"Helicopter Attack"		2:11
25.	"Hopeless Tango"		2:53
26.	"Rebellion of the Winged"		3:56
27.	"Jamaica"		3:56
28.	"Migration End Titles"		1:59
29.	"Survivor (Full Version)"	Laferte	3:03

== Release history ==
Release dates and formats for Migration (Original Motion Picture Soundtrack)
Date	Format(s)	Label	Ref.
December 15, 2023	Digital download; streaming	Back Lot Music	

== Accolades ==
Award	Date of ceremony	Category	Recipient(s)	Result	Ref.
Hollywood Music in Media Awards	November 15, 2023	Best Original Score — Animated Film	John Powell	Nominated	
