= Nahoo =

Studio album by Paul Mounsey
- Released: November 1994
- Studio: Play It Again Studios, São Paulo, Brazil
- Genre: Scottish folk Contemporary pop Brazilian
- Length: 51:48
- Label: Iona Records
- Producer: Paul Mounsey, João Vasconcelos

Paul Mounsey chronology
Nahoo (1994)	NahooToo (1997)

Professional ratings
Review scores
Source	Rating
AllMusic	3/5 stars

Nahoo is the debut album by Scottish musician Paul Mounsey, released in the United Kingdom in November 1994 by Iona Records.

== Reception ==
Allmusic's Steven McDonald stated that it was "Not the first Gaelic/world/techno fusion, but likely to be the first Scottish/Brazilian mix-up." and that "it's a matter of touching base with his roots and finding the "inherent groove" in Scottish folk music, while incorporating influences from his current home of Brazil; the techno element is purely commercial appeal, at a guess, but it's definitely done in a clever way. The Brazilian element is a bit more subtle than the Scottish, but you won't miss it."

Rhythm Music Magazine describe it as being a "fascinating meeting of the old (Celtic music) and the new ( 90's contemporary instrumentation) create an exotic journey to the highlands of Scotland and beyond."

Option, in their review of the album, states "a Scot living in Brazil, brings traditional Scottish fiddle tunes and mouth music to Bahia and updates the mix with techno dance rhythms and a salting of vocal samples and sound effects. Its a pretty gutsy project, and it doesn't always work, at time sounding like My Life in the Bush of Ghosts as done by the Battlefield Band, or a like new age/world fusion cliche."

== Track listing ==
1. "Passing Away" (5:16)
2. "Alba" (5:15)
3. "Robert Campbell's Lament" (3:06)
4. "Journeyman" (3:48)
5. "Dalmore" (3:58)
6. "Stranger In A Strange Land" (6:19)
7. "As Terras Baixas Da Holanda" (3:44)
8. "From Ebb To Flood" (6:02)
9. "I Will Go" (4:37)
10. "My Faithful Fond One" (4:49)
11. "Illusion" (4:54)
