= NahooToo =

Studio album by Paul Mounsey
- Released: 1997
- Genre: Scottish folk Contemporary pop Brazilian
- Length: 70:31

Paul Mounsey chronology
| Nahoo (1994) | NahooToo (1997) | Nahoo 3 - Notes from the Republic (1999) |

NahooToo is the second album by Scottish musician Paul Mounsey.

== Track listing ==
1. "Remembrance" (5:27)
2. "Wherever You Go" (5:04)
3. "North" (5:44)
4. "Infinite Contempt" (5:05)
5. "Another Clearance" (4:57)
6. "Kaiwa Farewell" (5:02)
7. "Psalm" (1:41)
8. "Turned On the Dog" (2:38)
9. "Nahoo" (5:59)
10. "The Fields of Robert John" (4:30)
11. "Fall" (4:03)
12. "A Mhairead Og (Pt. 1)" (1:07)
13. "A Mhairead Og (Pt. 2)" (4:18)
14. "Red River" (3:14)
15. "Hope You're Not Guilty" (4:41)
16. "Nahoo Reprise" (3:55)
17. "Lullaby" (3:06)

== Song uses ==
- North was used in VisitScotland TV adverts from 2002-2011.
- Fall was used in a countdowns broadcast on the TV channel BBC Alba between 2008 and 2018.
