= Thelma the Unicorn =

2024 American animated film

- Netflix release poster
- Directed by: Jared Hess; Lynn Wang
- Screenplay by: Jared Hess; Jerusha Hess
- Based on: Thelma the Unicorn by Aaron Blabey
- Produced by: Pam Coats
- Starring: Brittany Howard; Will Forte; Jemaine Clement; Edi Patterson; Fred Armisen; Zach Galifianakis; Jon Heder; Shondrella Avery
- Edited by: Edie Ichioka
- Music by: John Powell
- Production companies: Netflix Animation Studios; Scholastic Entertainment
- Distributed by: Netflix
- Release date: May 17, 2024
- Running time: 93 minutes
- Country: United States
- Language: English

Thelma the Unicorn is a 2024 American animated musical comedy film written by Jared and Jerusha Hess, and directed by Jared Hess and Lynn Wang (in Wang's feature film directorial debut). Based on the children's book series of the same name by Aaron Blabey, the film stars Brittany Howard as the titular character, alongside the voices of Will Forte, Jemaine Clement, Edi Patterson, Fred Armisen, Zach Galifianakis, Jon Heder and Shondrella Avery. The film marks the acting debut of Howard.

Thelma the Unicorn was released on Netflix on May 17, 2024, and produced by Netflix Animation Studios and Scholastic Entertainment. The film received generally positive reviews from critics.

== Plot ==
In a world where humans and talking animals live side by side, Thelma is a small farm pony who dreams of becoming a famous musician alongside her band mates Otis the donkey and Reggie the llama, who call themselves The Rusty Buckets. After a humiliating audition that could have guaranteed them a spot at the singing event SparklePalooza, a clumsy truck driver accidentally drenches Thelma - wearing a carrot on her forehead - in glitter and pink paint, giving her the appearance of a unicorn. Her look attracts a small crowd to her farm and she seizes this opportunity to sing. Despite Otis' objections of lying to people, Thelma decides to stick with her facade.

A blind, retired record dealer named Peggy Purvis hears The Rusty Buckets on TV and decides to make them her new comeback attraction. Soon, Thelma gains the attention of a snooty manager named Vic Diamond who works for the arrogant singer Nikki Narwhal. Vic contacts Peggy and after some arm-twisting, convinces her to make Thelma an opening attraction at Nikki's new concert. Reluctantly, Peggy agrees and when they go to rendezvous with Vic, the latter uses a missile to destroy a limo carrying Peggy, her husband Gerald, Otis and Reggie while he and Thelma go on without them.

At Nikki's show, when her friends fail to make it in time, Thelma is forced to sing solo where she receives a standing ovation from the crowd. Vic makes her sign a contract to make him manager, leaving Nikki. Outraged, Nikki attempts to attack Thelma but is booed by the audience, causing her fame to plummet.

While making it through a crowd of fans, Thelma meets Otis and the two have an argument about him and the rest of her friends not being at the show. Thelma reveals her secret to Vic but he doesn't care, claiming that putting on a facade is the only way to succeed in the industry. Vic convinces Thelma to pretend dating internet star Danny Stallion to increase her fame. Meanwhile, Nikki orders her assistant Megan Shank to find some dirt on Thelma to ruin her image.

Vic manages to book Thelma a spot on SparklePalooza. During an awards ceremony that Thelma is attending, Megan, after discovering her "horn" coming loose, confronts Thelma in the bathroom, washes off her unicorn disguise and threatens to reveal her deception. Reluctantly, Thelma offers to permanently quit the music business to stop Megan from exposing her. Megan accepts, and warns Thelma of the consequences if she comes back. A heartbroken Thelma leaves, and is declared missing.

Two weeks later, Thelma hitches a ride with the driver who instigated her unicorn disguise. He reveals hiding a secret from his girlfriend, as he feels that she wouldn't accept him for who he is. Inspired, Thelma tells the driver to drop her off at a gas station where she reunites with her friends.

Wanting to fix things, Thelma and her friends go to SparklePalooza just as Nikki is about to go on. After evading Nikki and Megan, Thelma dons her unicorn persona and proceeds to reveal her true self by wiping off her disguise. Although outraged at first, the crowd soon accepts Thelma for who she is when The Rusty Buckets play a song about embracing one's true self. Touched by the performance, a reformed Nikki rejects both Megan and Vic. Thelma and her friends return to the music business, now under a record deal made by Peggy.

== Voice cast ==
- Brittany Howard as Thelma, a mini-sized pony that is painted to resemble a unicorn
- Will Forte as Otis, a donkey and Thelma's best friend
- Jemaine Clement as Vic Diamond, a talent agent
- Edi Patterson as Megan Shank, a rival talent agent who is Nikki's henchwoman
- Fred Armisen as Danny Stallion, a stallion horse
- Zach Galifianakis as Crusty Trucker
- Jon Heder as Reggie, a llama
- Shondrella Avery as Zirconia
- Ally Dixon as Nikki Narwhal, a famously pampered but vicious narwhal
  - Baraka May as Nikki Narwhal's singing voice in an uncredited role
- Maliaka Mitchell as Peggy Purvis, a blind elderly record dealer
- Jared Hess as Gerald
- Noelle Holsinger as Suzie, Thelma's biggest fan

== Production ==
In June 2019, it was announced that Netflix acquired the film rights to Aaron Blabey's children's book Thelma the Unicorn after a bidding war, and was developing an animated musical adaptation. It would be directed by Jared Hess (who wrote the script with his wife Jerusha) and Lynn Wang with Blabey serving as an executive producer alongside Patrick Hughes. Pam Coats was announced to produce the film in April 2023. Mikros Animation and Agora Studio provided the animation. In December 2023, it was announced that John Powell would compose the film's musical score. In January 2024, Brittany Howard, Will Forte, Jemaine Clement, Edi Patterson, Fred Armisen, Zach Galifianakis, Jon Heder, Maliaka Mitchell, and Ally Dixon were announced as part of the cast. This is the fourth collaboration between Heder and Hess after Peluca (2003), Napoleon Dynamite (2004) and the 2012 animated television series of the same name.

== Soundtrack ==
Thelma the Unicorn (Soundtrack from the Netflix Film)

Soundtrack album by John Powell and various artists
- Released: May 17, 2024
- Studios: 5 Cat Studios; Los Angeles, California
- Length: 45:48
- Labels: Island Records; Netflix Music
- Producers: John Powell; Mike Elizondo; Various artists

John Powell chronology
Migration (Original Motion Picture Soundtrack) (2023)	Thelma the Unicorn (Soundtrack from the Netflix Film) (2024)	Wicked: The Original Motion Picture Score (2024)

Thelma the Unicorn (Soundtrack from the Netflix Film) is the film's soundtrack album of the same name which was recorded at 5 Cat Studios in Los Angeles, California, and was released on May 17, 2024, by Island Records and Netflix Music. The soundtrack features John Powell's musical score with additional music by Batu Sener as well as songs that are also featured in the film itself, including "Blubber Trouble" by Baraka May, "Pool Boys" by Pool Boys and Big Freedia, "3 C's to Success" by Jemaine Clement and seven Brittany Howard songs ("Fire Inside", "Hurricane", "Big", "Here Comes the Cud" (with Fred Armisen), "Only Unicorn", "Just as You Are" and "Goldmine").

Thelma the Unicorn also features other songs that are also not featured on its soundtrack, including "Hold On, I'm Comin'" by Sam & Dave, a rerecording of "Conga" by Gloria Estefan, "Diamond Girl" by Nice & Wild, "After Midnight" by Chappell Roan, "Dance Across the Floor" by Jimmy Horne, "Shake Your Pants" by Cameo, "Hollywood Swinging" by Kool & the Gang, "Bodyshakin'" by 911, "Dancing to the Beat" by Clarence Murray, "Slam" by Onyx, "Jump into the Fire" by Harry Nilsson, Jeff McCollister's two songs ("The Hardest Part of Breaking Up" and "Right Where It Counts") and Brittany Howard's cover version of Lenny Kravitz's song "Are You Gonna Go My Way".

=== Track listing ===
No.	Title	Length
1.	"Fire Inside" (performed by Brittany Howard)	1:57
2.	"Blubber Trouble" (performed by Baraka May)	2:24
3.	"Pool Boys" (performed by Pool Boys and Big Freedia)	2:15
4.	"Hurricane" (performed by Brittany Howard)	1:16
5.	"Big" (performed by Brittany Howard)	2:21
6.	"3 C's to Success" (performed by Jemaine Clement)	3:18
7.	"Here Comes the Cud" (performed by Fred Armisen and Brittany Howard)	2:33
8.	"Only Unicorn" (performed by Brittany Howard)	2:16
9.	"Just as You Are" (performed by Brittany Howard)	3:26
10.	"Goldmine" (performed by Brittany Howard)	3:55
11.	"Diners and Carrots" (composed by John Powell)	3:24
12.	"Becoming a Unicorn" (composed by John Powell)	1:03
13.	"They Liked Our Music" (composed by John Powell)	1:37
14.	"Red Carpet" (composed by John Powell)	2:36
15.	"Schemes and Fantasies" (composed by John Powell)	2:53
16.	"Blackmail Loo" (composed by John Powell)	2:30
17.	"Thelma Missing" (composed by John Powell)	2:02
18.	"Rescue & Coming Clean" (composed by John Powell)	2:13
19.	"Resolutions" (composed by John Powell)	2:02
Total length:		45:48

== Release ==
Thelma the Unicorn was released on Netflix on May 17, 2024.

== Reception ==
=== Critical response ===
On the review aggregator website Rotten Tomatoes, 60% of 20 critics' reviews are positive, with an average rating of 6/10. The website's consensus reads: "Though weighed down by a familiar story and an overactive final act, Thelma the Unicorn delivers enough oddball humor, colorful energy, and heartfelt charm to make for a reasonably pleasant family watch." Metacritic, which uses a weighted average, assigned the film a score of 64 out of 100, based on 6 critics, indicating "generally favorable" reviews.

=== Accolades ===
The film was nominated for the 2025 Visual Effects Society Award for Outstanding Animated Character in an Animated Feature.
