= The Call of the Wild (2020 film) =

2020 American adventure film

- Theatrical release poster
- Directed by: Chris Sanders
- Screenplay by: Michael Green
- Based on: The Call of the Wild by Jack London
- Produced by: Erwin Stoff; James Mangold
- Starring: Harrison Ford; Omar Sy; Cara Gee; Dan Stevens; Karen Gillan; Bradley Whitford
- Cinematography: Janusz Kamiński
- Edited by: William Hoy; David Heinz
- Music by: John Powell
- Production company: 3 Arts Entertainment
- Distributed by: 20th Century Studios
- Release date: February 21, 2020 (United States)
- Running time: 100 minutes
- Country: United States
- Language: English
- Budget: $125–150 million
- Box office: $111.1 million

The Call of the Wild is a 2020 American adventure film directed by Chris Sanders from a screenplay by Michael Green. It is based on the 1903 novel of the same name by Jack London. The film stars Harrison Ford, Omar Sy, Cara Gee, Dan Stevens, Karen Gillan, and Bradley Whitford. Set during the 1890s Klondike Gold Rush, the film follows a dog named Buck as he is stolen from his home in California and sent to the Yukon, where he befriends an old outdoorsman and begins a life-altering adventure.

The Call of the Wild was released in the United States on February 21, 2020, by 20th Century Studios (its first film under the company's new name). It received mixed-to-positive reviews from critics, who praised Ford's performance, John Powell’s music and the "entertaining action and earnest tone" but criticized the "uncanny valley" effect of the CGI animals. The film's release was cut short due to the COVID-19 pandemic, grossing $111.1 million against a production budget of $125–150 million, and lost the studio an estimated $50–100 million.

== Plot ==
During the late 19th century, Buck, a large, gentle crossbred Saint Bernard–Scotch Shepherd dog, lives contentedly with his master, Judge Miller, in Santa Clara, California. One night, Buck is abducted and shipped to the Yukon aboard a freighter to be sold. During the voyage, a crew member beats him with a club to enforce discipline. Once in Alaska, an elderly frontiersman named John Thornton drops his harmonica which Buck retrieves for him, moments before being sold to Perrault and his partner Francoise for their dog sled to deliver mail across the Yukon. Perrault hopes that with Buck, he can make the long trek to the mail depot before the deadline. Buck is introduced to the other dogs; Dolly, Pike, Jo, Billie, Dub, Dave, Sol-leks, and the pack leader, a husky named Spitz.

Buck gains the loyalty and trust of Perrault, Francoise and the other sled dogs, after proving himself along the way. He rescues Francoise when she falls through the ice. All of this antagonizes Spitz, who sees it as a challenge to his authority. Buck begins experiencing ancestral visions of a black wolf that acts as his guide throughout their travels. One night, Buck catches a rabbit but decides to release it. Spitz kills it before attacking Buck to assert his dominance. Spitz seems to win until the rest of the pack encourages Buck, who pins Spitz down, displacing him as pack leader; Spitz then disappears into the wild. Buck takes his place as the lead dog, which Perrault grudgingly accepts after the other dogs refuse. Buck's speed and strength allow the sled to arrive with the mail on time. There, Thornton hands over a letter he has written to his former wife expressing his feelings about their dead son. He and Buck recognize each other. Soon after, Perrault learns the mail route is being replaced by the telegraph, forcing him to sell the dogs.

Hal, a mean-spirited and inexperienced gold prospector, buys the pack and works them to exhaustion carrying a heavy load, along with three people, in weather unsuitable for sledding. The exhausted dogs collapse before Hal can force them to cross an unstable frozen lake. When Buck is unable to move, Hal threatens to shoot him. Thornton appears and rescues Buck while Hal forces the other sled dogs to cross the melting lake. Under Thornton's care, Buck recovers. Later, at a saloon, Thornton is attacked by Hal, who reveals he is the only human survivor and the dogs ran off, leaving him with nothing. Witnessing the scene, Buck attacks Hal, who is subsequently thrown out. Buck and Thornton then travel beyond the Yukon map where they can freely live in the wild. They come across an abandoned cabin in an open valley and settle in. Meanwhile, Hal searches for them for revenge, believing Thornton is hiding a source of gold.

In the open wilderness, Thornton and Buck bond over their daily activities, primarily fishing and gold panning. Throughout their time together, Buck is drawn to a female white wolf. After saving a member of the female's pack, Buck goes between his domesticated life with Thornton and his place with the wolf pack. After some time together, Thornton believes it is time to return home by himself and let Buck stay in the wild. Never wanting the gold from the start, Thornton throws it back into the river except for some "grocery money," and tells Buck he is leaving in the morning, and to come and say good-bye. Buck heads into the forest and sleeps beside the white wolf. That night, Hal finds and shoots Thornton, demanding to know where all the gold is. Thornton throws the "grocery money" at him, but it does not placate Hal. Buck returns and kills Hal by pushing him into the cabin, which collapses from the flames. Thornton reassures him with his final words before dying. The next morning, Buck finds the white wolf, has offspring with her, and becomes the leader of the pack.

== Cast ==
- Terry Notary as Buck, an enormous, gentle, kind-hearted dog who is a mix of Saint Bernard and Scotch Shepherd. His model was scanned after an adopted dog.
- Harrison Ford as John Thornton, an experienced frontiersman and Buck's fourth master
- Omar Sy as Perrault, a French-Canadian mail runner and Buck's second master
- Dan Stevens as Hal, Charles’ brother-in-law, Mercedes’ brother, and Buck's third master who abuses him and his fellow dogs
- Karen Gillan as Mercedes, Hal's spoiled sister and Charles’ wife.
- Bradley Whitford as Judge Miller, Buck's first master who spoils him
- Cara Gee as Françoise, a First Nations mail runner and Perrault's assistant
- Jean Louisa Kelly as Katie Miller, Judge Miller's wife
- Colin Woodell as Charles, Mercedes' cowardly husband and Hal's brother-in-law
- Michael Horse as Edenshaw, Native-American friend of John Thornton

== Production ==
In October 2017, it was announced that 20th Century Fox was developing a new film adaptation of Jack London's 1903 novel The Call of the Wild, set in the Yukon during the 1890s Klondike Gold Rush. The film was set to be directed by Chris Sanders from a script by Michael Green, and produced by Erwin Stoff. In July 2018, Harrison Ford and Dan Stevens were cast in the film, with Ford starring as John Thornton, who goes on the search for gold. In August 2018, Colin Woodell joined the cast. In September, Omar Sy and Karen Gillan were added, while Bradley Whitford came aboard in October, and Cara Gee joined in November.

Principal photography on the film began in late September 2018 in Los Angeles. The film was not shot on location, as extensive use was made of CGI, with some scenes also being filmed on sets in Los Angeles and exteriors in Santa Clarita, California. All in all, the production spent $109 million filming in California, with the final budget reaching $125–150 million by the time post-production wrapped. The visual effects were provided by Moving Picture Company (MPC), led by MPC's studio in Montreal, with Erik Nash serving as vfx supervisor, and also by Soho VFX and Technoprops. The production team used computer animation to create a realistic version of the dog 'Buck'.

== Music ==
In January 2019, it was announced that John Powell would compose the film's score. Powell previously collaborated with Sanders on the 2010 DreamWorks Animation film How to Train Your Dragon.

Recording primarily took place in Los Angeles at the Newman Scoring Stage, with Powell conducting a 90-piece orchestra, as well as employing a 60-voice choir for the score. Joining him were regular composers Batu Sener and Paul Mounsey, who provided additional music. The soundtrack was released digitally on February 21, 2020, by Hollywood Records.

== Release ==
=== Theatrical ===
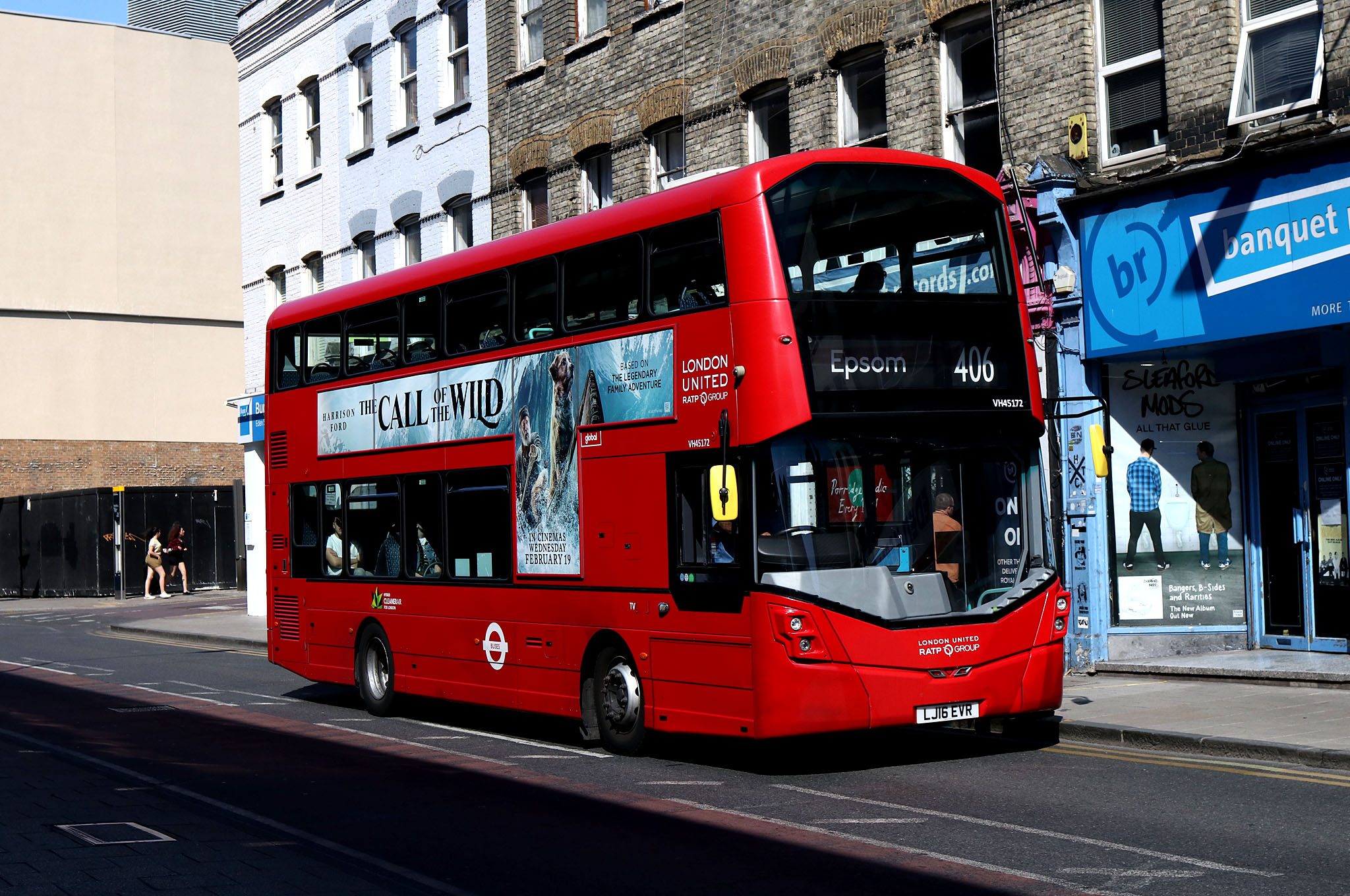
A bus advertising the film in London

The film was originally set to be released on December 25, 2019, but was pushed back to February 21, 2020, following the acquisition of Fox by Disney, to accommodate the December releases of Star Wars: The Rise of Skywalker and Spies in Disguise. The Call of the Wild was also the first film released by 20th Century Studios, following its rebranding from 20th Century Fox by its parent Walt Disney Studios division. Coincidentally, the 1935 adaptation of the novel was the last film released under the Twentieth Century Pictures name before it merged with Fox Film to form 20th Century Fox. The film's theatrical release in China was delayed until November 13, 2020, due to the COVID-19 pandemic.

The Call of The Wild was released digitally on the night of March 27, 2020. The announcement followed Disney's earlier-than-planned releases of Frozen II and Onward on digital, due to the COVID-19 pandemic resulting in the closing of most theatres around the world.

=== Home media ===
The Call of The Wild was released on DVD, Blu-ray, and Ultra HD Blu-ray on May 12, 2020, by Walt Disney Studios Home Entertainment through the 20th Century Home Entertainment label.

The film ranked No. 7 on the FandangoNOW chart for the week ending April 12, 2020, based on total revenue from Monday to Sunday. It also secured the No. 1 position on the iTunes chart for the most recent daily placement as of April 13, 2020. The Call of The Wild debuted at No. 2 on both the NPD VideoScan First Alert chart, which tracks combined DVD and Blu-ray Disc unit sales, and the dedicated Blu-ray Disc sales chart for the week ended May 16, 2020. Blu-ray formats accounted for 57% of its first-week sales, with the 4K Ultra HD version comprising 7% of total units sold. It ranked No. 5 on both the NPD VideoScan First Alert chart and the Blu-ray Disc sales chart for the week ended May 23.

== Reception ==
=== Box office ===
The Call of the Wild grossed $62.3 million in the United States and Canada, and $48.5 million in other territories, for a worldwide total of $110.8 million. Its high production and marketing costs mean the film needed to gross $250–275 million in order to break even; various publications estimated it would lose the studio between $50–100 million.

In the United States and Canada, the film was released alongside Brahms: The Boy II and Impractical Jokers: The Movie as well as the wide expansion of The Lodge, and was projected to gross $15–20 million from 3,752 theaters in its opening weekend. The film made $8 million on its first day, including $1 million from Thursday night previews. It went on to overperform, debuting to $24.8 million and finishing second, behind holdover Sonic the Hedgehog; however, Deadline Hollywood wrote that "despite the over-indexing of Call of the Wild stateside, it's a hollow victory, given how much the film cost". The film made $13.2 million in its second weekend and $7 million on its third weekend, respectively finishing third and fifth.

=== Critical response ===
On Rotten Tomatoes, the film has an approval rating of 63% based on 208 reviews, with an average rating of 6/10. The website's critics consensus reads: "It's undermined by distracting and unnecessary CGI, but this heartwarming Call of the Wild remains a classic story, affectionately retold." On Metacritic, the film has a weighted average score of 48 out of 100, based on 44 critics, indicating "mixed or average" reviews. Audiences polled by CinemaScore gave the film an average grade of "A−" on an A+ to F scale, and PostTrak reported it received an average 4 out of 5 stars, with 59% of people surveyed saying they would definitely recommend it.

Owen Gleiberman of Variety praised Harrison Ford's performance, saying that he "acts with pure soul here (he also narrates the film with his lovely storybook growl); it's a minimalist performance, mostly very reactive, but the saintly gruffness of Ford’s thick-gray-bearded, sad-eyed presence helps to nudge Buck to life as a character."

=== Accolades ===
Year	Award	Category	Recipients	Result	Ref.
2020	World Soundtrack Awards	Public Choice	John Powell	Nominated	
2021	Golden Raspberry Awards	Worst Screen Combo	Harrison Ford and that fake-looking CGI "dog"	Nominated	
2021	International Film Music Critics Association Awards	Film Score of the Year	John Powell	Nominated	
2021	International Film Music Critics Association Awards	Best Original Score for an Action/Adventure/Thriller Film	John Powell	Won	
2021	Austin Film Critics Association Awards	Best Motion Capture/Special Effects Performance	Terry Notary	Nominated	
2021	Taurus World Stunt Awards	Best Overall Stunt by a Woman	Callie Croughwell, Alice Ford, Hannah Betts	Nominated	
