= John Michael Caldwell =

American mixing engineer

- Occupations: Score mixer; mixing engineer; audio engineer
- Years active: 2021–present
- Known for: Score mixing

John Michael Caldwell is an American music scoring mixer, recording engineer, and mixing engineer known for his work with film composers John Powell and Batu Sener. He has worked on the films Wicked (2024 film), How to Train Your Dragon (2025 film), Better Man (film), among others. Caldwell has been nominated for two Cinema Audio Society Awards in the categories Outstanding Achievement in Sound Mixing for a Motion Picture – Live Action and Outstanding Achievement in Sound Mixing for a Motion Picture – Documentary.

== Selected filmography ==
Year	Title	Director(s)	Composer(s)	Roles
2021	Locked Down	Doug Liman	John Powell	Score Engineer
2022	Ice Age: Scrat Tales	Donnie Long	Batu Sener	Score Recordist/Score Mixer
2022	Don't Worry Darling	Olivia Wilde	John Powell	Additional Score Recording/Score Mixer
2022	M3GAN	Gerard Johnstone	Anthony Willis	Score Mixer
2023	Still: A Michael J. Fox Movie	Davis Guggenheim	John Powell	Score Recordist/Score Mixer
2023	Migration	Benjamin Renner	John Powell	Additional Score Recording/Score Mixer
2023	Atatürk	Mehmet Ada Öztekin	Batu Sener	Score recorded and mixed by
2024	Thelma the Unicorn	Jared Hess, Lynn Wang	John Powell	Score Mixed by
2024	Harold and the Purple Crayon	Carlos Saldanha	Batu Sener	Score recorded and mixed by
2024	Better Man	Michael Gracey	Batu Sener	Score recorded and mixed by
2024	That Christmas	Simon Otto	John Powell	Score mixed by
2024	Wicked	Jon M. Chu	John Powell	Choir recorded by/score mixed by
2025	How to Train Your Dragon (2025 film)	Dean DeBlois	John Powell	Choir recorded by/score mixed by
2025	Wicked: For Good	Jon M. Chu	John Powell	Choir recorded by/score mixed by
