= International Film Music Critics Association Award for Film Music Composition of the Year =

International fim music award

The International Film Music Critics Association Award for Film Score of the Year is an annual award given by the International Film Music Critics Association, or the IFMCA. The award is given to the composer of a single film composition track deemed to be the best in a given year. It has been awards every year since 2006.

== Winners and nominations ==
=== 2000s ===
Best Single Cue

Year	Film	Composition	Composer(s)
2006	Lady in the Water	"The Great Eatlon"	James Newton Howard
2006	The Da Vinci Code	"Chevaliers de Sangreal"	Hans Zimmer
2006	Eragon	"Eragon"	Patrick Doyle
2006	V for Vendetta	"Evey Reborn"	Dario Marianelli

Film Music Composition of the Year

Year	Film	Composition	Composer(s)
2007	Atonement	"Elegy for Dunkirk"	Dario Marianelli
2007	Lions for Lambs	"Last Shift"	Mark Isham
2007	Lust, Caution	"Wong Chia Chi’s Theme"	Alexandre Desplat
2007	Pirates of the Caribbean: At World's End	"Up Is Down"	Hans Zimmer
2007	Zodiac	"Graysmith Obsessed"	David Shire
2008	Cloverfield	"Roar! (Cloverfield Overture)"	Michael Giacchino
2008	The Happening	"Be With You"	James Newton Howard
2008	Valkyrie	"They’ll Remember You"	John Ottman and Lior Rosner
2008	WALL-E	"Define Dancing"	Thomas Newman and Peter Gabriel
2008	Wanted	"Success Montage"	Danny Elfman
2009	Drag Me to Hell	"Concerto to Hell"	Christopher Young
2009	Avatar	"War"	James Horner
2009	The Red Canvas	"Ballet for Brawlers"	James Peterson
2009	Star Trek	"Enterprising Young Men"	Michael Giacchino
2009	Up	"Married Life"	Michael Giacchino

=== 2010s ===
Year	Film/Series	Composition	Composer(s)
2010	Alice in Wonderland	"Alice's Theme"	Danny Elfman
2010	The Ghost Writer	"The Truth About Ruth"	Alexandre Desplat
2010	How to Train Your Dragon	"Forbidden Friendship"	John Powell
2010	How to Train Your Dragon	"Test Drive"	John Powell
2010	The Last Airbender	"Flow Like Water"	James Newton Howard
2011	War Horse	"The Homecoming"	John Williams
2011	The Adventures of Tintin	"The Adventure Continues"	John Williams
2011	The Artist	"George Valentin"	Ludovic Bource
2011	Captain America: The First Avenger	"Captain America March"	Alan Silvestri
2011	Real Steel	"Final Round"	Danny Elfman
2012	The Impossible	"The Impossible Main Title"	Fernando Velázquez
2012	Cloud Atlas	"The Cloud Atlas Sextet (for Orchestra)"	Tom Tykwer, Reinhold Heil and Johnny Klimek
2012	John Carter	"John Carter of Mars"	Michael Giacchino
2012	Life of Pi	"Pi's Lullaby"	Mychael Danna
2012	Lincoln	"The Peterson House, and Finale"	John Williams
2013	Evil Dead	"Abominations Rising"	Roque Baños
2013	The Book Thief	"The Book Thief"	John Williams
2013	Escape from Tomorrow	"The Grand Finale	Abel Korzeniowski
2013	The Hobbit: The Desolation of Smaug	"Beyond the Forest"	Howard Shore
2013	Romeo & Juliet	"A Thousand Times Goodnight"	Abel Korzeniowski
2014	How to Train Your Dragon 2	"Flying with Mother"	John Powell
2014	Exodus: Gods and Kings	"Tsunami"	Harry Gregson-Williams
2014	The Hunger Games: Mockingjay – Part 1	"The Hanging Tree"	Jeremiah Fraites, James Newton Howard, Wesley Schultz (music); Suzanne Collins (lyrics)
2014	Maleficent	"Maleficent Flies"	James Newton Howard
2014	Maleficent	"Maleficent Suite"	James Newton Howard
2015	Star Wars: The Force Awakens	"The Jedi Steps / Finale"	John Williams
2015	The Hateful Eight	"L’ultima diligenza di Red Rock"	Ennio Morricone
2015	Mad Max: Fury Road	"Brothers in Arms"	Thomas Holkenborg
2015	Tomorrowland	"Pin-Ultimate Experience"	Michael Giacchino
2015	Wolf Totem	"Return to the Wild"	James Horner
2016	La La Land	"Epilogue"	Justin Hurwitz
2016	Doctor Strange	"The Master of the Mystic End Credits"	Michael Giacchino
2016	Game of Thrones	"Light of the Seven"	Ramin Djawadi
2016	Star Trek Beyond	"Night on the Yorktown"	Michael Giacchino
2016	Swiss Army Man	"Montage"	Andy Hull and Robert McDowell
2017	War for the Planet of the Apes	"End Credits"	Michael Giacchino
2017	The Boss Baby	"Love"	Hans Zimmer, Steve Mazzaro and Conrad Pope
2017	King Arthur: Legend of the Sword	"Growing Up in Londinium"	Daniel Pemberton
2017	Murder on the Orient Express	"Justice"	Patrick Doyle
2017	Star Wars: The Last Jedi	"Finale"	John Williams
2018	Solo: A Star Wars Story	"The Adventures of Han"	John Williams
2018	First Man	"The Landing"	Justin Hurwitz
2018	Mary Queen of Scots	"Finale"	Max Richter
2018	Red Sparrow	"Overture"	James Newton Howard
2018	Solo: A Star Wars Story	"Mine Mission"	John Powell
2019	Star Wars: The Rise of Skywalker	"The Rise of Skywalker"	John Williams
2019	Avengers: Endgame	"Portals"	Alan Silvestri
2019	Joker	"Call Me Joker"	Hildur Guðnadóttir
2019	A Hidden Life	"A Hidden Life"	James Newton Howard
2019	1917	"The Night Window"	Thomas Newman

=== 2020s ===
Year	Film/Series	Composition	Composer(s)
2020	The Queen's Gambit	"Main Title"	Carlos Rafael Rivera
2020	The Call of the Wild	"Buck Takes the Lead"	John Powell
2020	Fukushima	"Symphonic Suite F – 1st Chapter: All Life"	Tarō Iwashiro
2020	Wonder Woman 1984	"1984"	Hans Zimmer
2020	Wonder Woman 1984	"Themyscira"	Hans Zimmer
2021	Spider-Man: No Way Home	"Arachnoverture"	Michael Giacchino
2021	Buckley's Chance	"Riddles"	Christopher Gordon
2021	Claret	"Claret, Tema Principal"	Oscar Martín Leanizbarrutia
2021	Coppelia	"Grand Finale"	Maurizio Malagnini
2021	My Country, My Parents	"The Final Battle"	Gordy Haab
