= Paul Mounsey =

- Born: 15 April 1959 (age 67); Scotland
- Genres: Celtic fusion, film scores, Brazilian music
- Occupations: Musician, composer, arranger, record producer
- Years active: 1985–present

Paul Mounsey (born 15 April 1959) is a Scottish musician, composer, arranger and record producer.

A graduate of Trinity College, London, where he studied with Richard Arnell, Mounsey has composed for film, television, theatre, and television commercials, as well as the concert hall and the Latin American pop market. He has written pop hits for Mexican boy bands, received commissions for concert and multimedia works, lived with and recorded the music of indigenous communities in the Amazon rainforest, and has released five solo albums. Paul Mounsey collaborated with composers John Powell, Henry Jackman and Danny Elfman. He is currently based in Los Angeles, California, United States, working as composer, orchestrator and programmer in the film industry.

Mounsey's fifth album, Tha Na Laithean a' Dol Seachad (The Days Flash Past), was commissioned to celebrate the opening, in September 2005, of the An Lanntair Arts Centre in Stornoway on the Isle of Lewis, Scotland.

== Discography ==
=== Solo albums ===
- Nahoo (1994)
- NahooToo (1997)
- Nahoo 3 – Notes from the Republic (1999)
- City of Walls (2003)
- Tha Na Laithean a' Dol Seachad (The Days Flash Past) (2005)

=== With Runrig ===
- Proterra (2003)
