= Batu Sener =

Musical artist and composer

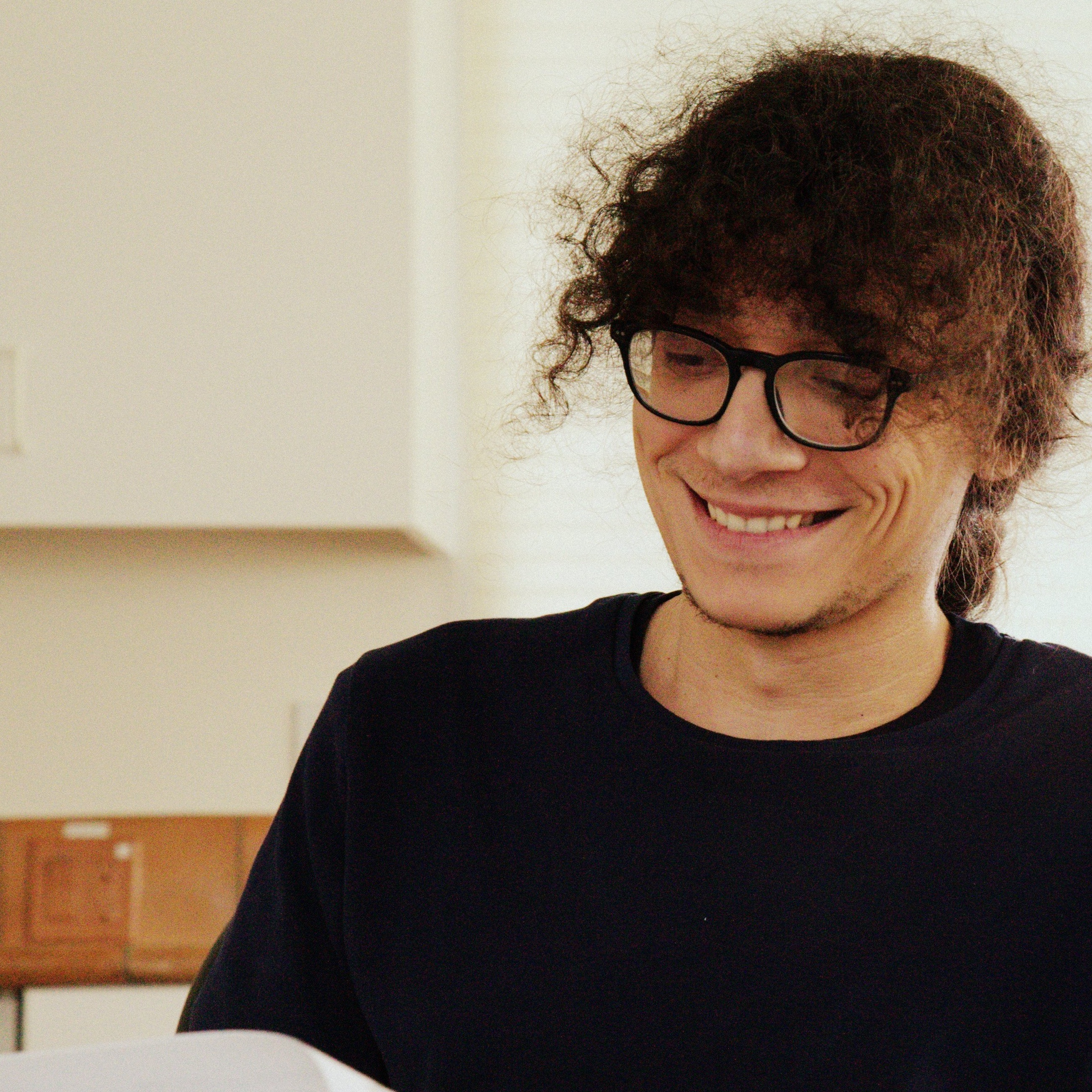

Background information
- Born: İzmir, Turkey
- Genres: Film score, television score
- Occupations: Music composer Producer; Arranger; Orchestrator
- Instruments: Piano, keyboards
- Years active: 2014–present
- Label: Crashington Music
- Website: batusener.com

Batu Sener is a Turkish composer, orchestrator, and arranger based in Los Angeles. Sener is known for his work on the Ice Age franchise, Harold and the Purple Crayon, and Better Man.

He actively works alongside Oscar-nominated composer John Powell and has written additional music for films including Pan, Jason Bourne, Ferdinand, Solo: A Star Wars Story, as well as How to Train Your Dragon: The Hidden World, Migration and most recently Wicked and the live-action remake of How to Train Your Dragon.

His recent works include the studio album Lugano Impressions, an a cappella choir single titled 'LII Dies Tenebrarum,' and the score for the film Better Man, which earned him his AACTA Award for Best Original Music Score. He was a nominee for Breakthrough Composer of the Year in 2022 at IFMCA Awards.

== Early life and education ==
From the age of 3, he trained as a pianist for 17 years at Bilkent University Faculty of Music and Performance Arts and Anadolu University State Conservatory before moving to the United States to study film scoring at Berklee College of Music and composition at Columbia College Chicago. Once in Los Angeles, he met John Powell and has been his collaborator on every single film score and project since 2014.

== Career ==
Sener's first feature length score was in the Ice Age franchise titled The Ice Age Adventures of Buck Wild. A few months later, in the same franchise, Sener scored Ice Age: Scrat Tales, a mini TV series produced by Blue Sky Studios, which turned out to be the last project they released before the studio closed. Sener had collaborated with director Carlos Saldanha via John Powell on the animated feature film Ferdinand. This relationship led to his next feature score Harold and the Purple Crayon. He continues working out of John Powell's 5 Cat Studios and Powell is credited as Score Consultant on this score.

Meanwhile, in Turkey and Europe, Sener scored Atatürk, a two-part Turkish epic biographical historical drama film directed by Mehmet Ada Öztekin and written by Necati Şahin. The film follows the life of the founding father of the Republic of Turkey, Mustafa Kemal Atatürk. This project was initially intended to be a 6-episode television series. It stars Aras Bulut İynemli in the title role. The first part of the film, titled Atatürk 1881 - 1919 premiered on October 29, 2023 and the second one, Atatürk II 1881 - 1919 premiered on January 5, 2024, both in Turkey and across Europe. Both films and the television version were later released on Amazon Prime Video.

In 2024, he released an album of arrangements of some of the most recognized traditional pop songs, Reset, by Ben Fuller. Sener is credited as a performer and producer on the album as well. He later scored Michael Gracey's Better Man, a biographical jukebox musical drama film based on the life of the English singer Robbie Williams.

In his work with John Powell, Sener has supplied compositions, arrangements, and orchestrations for over 15 films, along with a wide range of additional recording projects, including Jason Bourne, Solo: A Star Wars Story, How to Train Your Dragon franchise, Don't Worry Darling, Wicked and Wicked: For Good. Sener is also credited as producer on multiple albums including Ferdinand, The Call of the Wild and archival soundtracks from 5 Cat Studios. He has performed on soundtrack festivals and film music concerts across the world. He also worked as an arranger on Home, a single by Nick Jonas for the animated film Ferdinand.

In September 2026, Sener was announced to be the composer of the 6th theatrical installment of the Ice Age franchise Ice Age: Boiling Point.

== Filmography ==
=== As a score composer ===
Year	Title	Director	Note(s)	Studio(s)/Publisher(s)
2022	The Ice Age Adventures of Buck Wild	John C. Donkin	Original theme music composed by John Powell; Nominated for a Public Choice Award at the World Soundtrack Awards in 2022; Winner for a Best Streaming Media Award at the BMI Film & TV Awards in 2023	Walt Disney Pictures; 20th Century Studios; 20th Century Animation; Bardel Entertainment
2022	Ice Age: Scrat Tales	Donnie Long	Last feature film by Blue Sky Studios; End title theme music composed by John Powell; Nominated for "Best Score in a TV Show/Limited Series" at the Hollywood Music in Media Awards in 2022	Blue Sky Studios; 20th Century Animation
2023	Atatürk 1881 - 1919	Mehmet Ada Öztekin	Additional music composed by Markus Siegel	Lanistar Media
2023	Atatürk II 1881 - 1919	Mehmet Ada Öztekin	Additional music composed by Markus Siegel	Lanistar Media
2024	Harold and the Purple Crayon	Carlos Saldanha	Additional music composed by Markus Siegel	Columbia Pictures; Davis Entertainment
2025	Better Man	Michael Gracey	Winner for an AACTA Award for Best Original Music Score in 2025	Paramount Pictures
2025	Xfinity x Wicked: For Good	Alice Brooks	Comcast Xfinity's co-promotional short film	Comcast; Universal Pictures
2027	Ice Age: Boiling Point	John C. Donkin		20th Century Studios; 20th Century Animation

=== As an additional music composer ===
Year	Title	Director(s)	Lead Composer
2015	Pan	Joe Wright	John Powell
2016	Jason Bourne	Paul Greengrass	John Powell
2017	Ferdinand	Carlos Saldanha	John Powell
2018	Solo: A Star Wars Story	Ron Howard	John Powell
2019	How to Train Your Dragon: The Hidden World	Dean DeBlois	John Powell
2020	The Call of the Wild	Chris Sanders	John Powell
2021	Locked Down	Doug Liman	John Powell
2022	Don't Worry Darling	Olivia Wilde	John Powell
2023	Still: A Michael J. Fox Movie	Davis Guggenheim	John Powell
2023	Migration	Benjamin Renner	John Powell
2024	Thelma the Unicorn	Jared Hess; Lynn Wang	John Powell
2024	That Christmas	Simon Otto	John Powell
2024	Wicked	Jon M. Chu	John Powell
2025	How to Train Your Dragon	Dean DeBlois	John Powell
2025	Wicked: For Good	Jon M. Chu	John Powell
2026	Minions & Monsters	Pierre Coffin	John Powell

== Studio albums ==
Year	Title	Notes	Label	Catalogue
2016	The Phoenix (Original Motion Picture Score)	Score to the film by the same title directed by Jim DanDee	Crashington Music	CM001
2019	Lugano Impressions	Sener's first studio album for chamber music. Includes 'Lugano Suite' for cello and piano. Performed by Charlie Tyler and Batu Sener. Written, Recorded and Produced at 5 Cat Studios by John Michael Caldwell.	5 Cat Studios	FCS002
2020	LII Dies Tenebrarum	A Cappella Choir Single	5 Cat Studios	FCS004
2021	Piano Solos from "How to Train Your Dragon: The Hidden World"	Arranged and Performed by Batu Sener.	5 Cat Studios	FCS005
2020	Piano Solos from "The Call of the Wild"	Arranged and Performed by Batu Sener.	5 Cat Studios	FCS006
2021	Wade in the Water (Music from the Motion Picture)	From the motion picture title Wade in the Water, directed by David Bianchi. Music by Batu Sener. Vocals by Onyi Love.	Crashington Music	CM002
2024	Reset	Traditional Pop album by Ben Fuller. Arranged and Performed by Batu Sener.	Crashington Music	CM004
2024	Night and Day	Single by Ben Fuller. Arranged and Performed by Batu Sener.	Crashington Music	CM005
2026	An Occasional Man	Traditional Pop album by Ben Fuller. Arrangements by Batu Sener. Co-produced with Ben Fuller. Musicians: Sean Hurley, bass; George Doering, guitars; Charlie Tyler, cello; Alec Lubin, percussion; Batu Sener, piano	Crashington Music	CM007

== See also ==
- Category:Films scored by Batu Sener
