= How to Train Your Dragon 2 (2027 film) =

Upcoming film by Dean DeBlois

- Directed by: Dean DeBlois
- Screenplay by: Dean DeBlois
- Based on: How to Train Your Dragon by Cressida Cowell
- Produced by: Marc Platt; Adam Siegel
- Starring: Mason Thames; Nico Parker; Nick Frost; Ólafur Darri Ólafsson; Phil Dunster; Cate Blanchett; Gerard Butler
- Cinematography: Bill Pope
- Edited by: Paul Machliss
- Music by: John Powell
- Production companies: DreamWorks Animation; Marc Platt Productions
- Distributed by: Universal Pictures
- Release date: June 11, 2027
- Country: United States
- Language: English

How to Train Your Dragon 2 is an upcoming American fantasy film and a live-action remake of the 2014 animated film by DreamWorks Animation, itself loosely based on Cressida Cowell's book series. It will be the second installment of the live-action How to Train Your Dragon film series following How to Train Your Dragon (2025), and the fifth film overall in the franchise. Written and directed by Dean DeBlois, the film stars Mason Thames, Nico Parker, Gabriel Howell, Julian Dennison, Bronwyn James, Harry Trevaldwyn, Nick Frost, and Gerard Butler, all reprising their roles from the first film, with Cate Blanchett reprising her role as Valka from the animated films and Ólafur Darri Ólafsson joining the cast alongside Phil Dunster.

How to Train Your Dragon 2 is scheduled to be theatrically released in the United States by Universal Pictures on June 11, 2027.

== Premise ==
Five years after the events of the first film, Hiccup reunites with his long-lost mother, Valka, and must confront Drago Bludvist, a vengeful madman who seeks to conquer the world with a dragon army.

== Cast ==
- Mason Thames as Hiccup Horrendous Haddock III, the son of Valka and Stoick the Vast, and Astrid's boyfriend.
- Nico Parker as Astrid Hofferson, Hiccup's girlfriend.
- Cate Blanchett as Valka, Hiccup's long-lost mother and Stoick's wife, who lives as a hermit protecting dragons. Blanchett reprises her role from the animated films.
- Gerard Butler as Stoick the Vast, Berk's chieftain, Hiccup's father and Valka's husband. Butler also reprises his role from the animated films.
- Nick Frost as Gobber the Belch, Berk's blacksmith and Stoick's best friend and advisor with customizable prosthetics that go over where his right hand used to be.
- Ólafur Darri Ólafsson as Drago Bludvist, a ruthless warlord and dragon hunter who seeks to take over the world with a dragon army. Ólafsson previously voiced Ragnar the Rock in How to Train Your Dragon: The Hidden World (2019), the third animated film.
- Phil Dunster as Eret, son of Eret, a dragon trapper who sells captured dragons to Drago.
- Gabriel Howell as Snotlout Jorgenson, Hiccup's rival.
- Julian Dennison as Fishlegs Ingerman, Hiccup's best friend who is obsessed with memorizing dragon statistics.
- Bronwyn James as Ruffnut Thorston, Tuffnut's twin sister.
- Harry Trevaldwyn as Tuffnut Thorston, Ruffnut's twin brother.
- Naomi Wirthner as Gothi, the village elder.

== Production ==
=== Development ===
On April 2, 2025, during CinemaCon, it was announced that a sequel to How to Train Your Dragon (2025) was in development, with Dean DeBlois returning to write and direct. In January 2026, it was revealed that most of the cast would return from the first film, with Cate Blanchett reprising her role as Valka from the animated films and Ólafur Darri Ólafsson joining the cast as Drago Bludvist, after previously voicing Ragnar the Rock in How to Train Your Dragon: The Hidden World (2019). Phil Dunster joined the cast as Eret, son of Eret later that same month.

=== Filming ===
Principal photography began on January 26, 2026, at Sky Studios Elstree in London, as announced by DeBlois on Instagram, and it was expected to wrap in April. DeBlois revealed that filming had wrapped on May 15.

In April 2026, while the film was in production, a special effects technician severed multiple fingers in an incident involving a saw in a workshop at Sky Studios Elstree.

== Release ==
How to Train Your Dragon 2 is scheduled to be theatrically released in the United States by Universal Pictures on June 11, 2027.
