= Dragons: Gift of the Night Fury =

- DVD cover
- Directed by: Tom Owens
- Written by: Adam F. Goldberg
- Based on: How to Train Your Dragon by Cressida Cowell Characters by: Will Davies; Chris Sanders; Dean DeBlois
- Produced by: Dean DeBlois (Executive); Kate Spencer
- Starring: Jay Baruchel; America Ferrera; Gerard Butler; Craig Ferguson; Jonah Hill; Christopher Mintz-Plasse; Kristen Wiig; T. J. Miller
- Edited by: John K. Carr
- Music by: Dominic Lewis; John Powell
- Production company: DreamWorks Animation
- Distributed by: Paramount Home Entertainment
- Release date: November 15, 2011
- Running time: 22 minutes
- Country: United States
- Language: English

Dragons: Gift of the Night Fury is a 2011 American animated Christmas short film by DreamWorks Animation and directed by Tom Owens. It was released on November 15, 2011, on DVD and Blu-ray, along with another original animated short film Book of Dragons.

Based on the 2010 film How to Train Your Dragon, in-turn loosely inspired by the 2003 novel of the same name, the short takes place in the middle of preparing for the Viking winter holiday. After all dragons inexplicably fly away, the last one of them unwittingly kidnaps Hiccup. Jay Baruchel, Gerard Butler, Craig Ferguson, America Ferrera, Jonah Hill, T.J. Miller, Kristen Wiig, and Christopher Mintz-Plasse all reprise their roles from the original film.

== Plot ==
Right before Berk's traditional winter holiday of Snoggletog, all the dragons of Berk unexpectedly depart, leaving everyone distraught – except for Toothless, who cannot fly by himself. Out of compassion, Hiccup builds him a new automatic tailfin allowing him independent flight, thus gifting him his freedom; he then flies off too.

Three days later, Meatlug, Fishlegs' dragon whom he had secretly kept chained, escapes, inadvertently taking Hiccup with her. Meatlug takes him to an island with hot springs, where all the dragons (except Toothless, who is nowhere to be found) have been hatching their eggs. Meanwhile, on Berk, Astrid and the other teens discover dragon eggs in Meatlug's nest, which they scatter around Berk in hopes of lifting the villagers' spirits; this plan backfires, because dragon eggs hatch explosively (normally underwater). Berk is severely damaged in the process, leaving Stoick alarmed.

On the dragons' island, Hiccup found Stormfly (Astrid's dragon) and Hookfang (Snotlout's dragon) and their newly hatched babies; in asking for a ride home, he inadvertently triggers the dragons' return migration. He quickly decides to use a nearby wrecked ship to carry the baby dragons, who cannot yet fly as far as Berk. The Berkians are overjoyed at their dragons' return and the new babies, though Hiccup is still distraught at Toothless' absence. During the ensuing Snoggletog celebration, Toothless returns with Hiccup's lost helmet, which he had dropped into the sea earlier; the two enjoy a heartfelt reunion.

The next morning, Toothless discards his new tail, begging Hiccup to put the old tailfin on him and fly with him by controlling his fin manually as opposed to passively riding him; in doing so, he gives Hiccup a "better gift" – his friendship and companionship. (Note: Hiccup would later build another automatic tailfin for Toothless in How to Train Your Dragon: The Hidden World (2019).)

== Voice cast ==
- Jay Baruchel as Hiccup Horrendous Haddock III
- America Ferrera as Astrid Hofferson
- Gerard Butler as Stoick the Vast
- Craig Ferguson as Gobber the Belch
- Jonah Hill as Snotlout Jorgenson
- Christopher Mintz-Plasse as Fishlegs Ingerman
- Kristen Wiig as Ruffnut Thorston
- T.J. Miller as Tuffnut Thorston

== Home media ==
Dragons: Gift of the Night Fury was released on Blu-ray and DVD on November 15, 2011, along with Book of Dragons. It was released on Blu-ray and DVD as part of the DreamWorks Holiday Classics. It was re-released on DVD on October 1, 2013, along with Shrek the Halls, Merry Madagascar, Kung Fu Panda Holiday, and The Croods. The short was released again on Blu-ray and DVD on October 15, 2019, by Universal Pictures Home Entertainment, this time as part of the DreamWorks Ultimate Holiday Collection set.
