= How to Train Your Dragon: Homecoming =

2019 American animated short film

- Based on: How to Train Your Dragon by Cressida Cowell
- Written by: Jonathan Groff; Jon Pollack
- Directed by: Tim Johnson
- Starring: Jay Baruchel; Gerard Butler; Craig Ferguson; America Ferrera; Liam Ferguson; Madalyn Gonzalez
- Music by: Anthony B. Willis
- Country of origin: United States
- Original language: English

Production
- Producer: Craig Rittenbauren
- Running time: 22 minutes
- Production company: DreamWorks Animation

Original release
- Network: NBC
- Release: December 3, 2019

How to Train Your Dragon: Homecoming is a 2019 animated short film by DreamWorks and directed by Tim Johnson. Set before the epilogue of How to Train Your Dragon: The Hidden World (2019), it was simultaneously released on DVD and aired on NBC on December 3, 2019.

== Plot ==
A decade after the dragons parted ways with the Vikings of New Berk, (Note: As depicted in How to Train Your Dragon: The Hidden World (2019)) the villagers prepare for Snoggletog. Hiccup and Astrid find out that their children, Zephyr and Nuffink, have developed a fear of dragons after finding some of Stoick's old books. To avoid their children bearing the same hatred towards dragons as their ancestors, Astrid suggests bringing back the Snoggletog Pageant to tell the story of how Vikings and dragons made peace. (Note: As depicted in How to Train Your Dragon (2010)) Gobber agrees to help them as he sees it as a chance to remind the children of New Berk how much of an impact Stoick had on their village. He casts himself as Stoick and Tuffnut as Hiccup, while the real Hiccup creates a mechanical costume that resembles Toothless.

In the Hidden World, Toothless draws a picture of Hiccup and New Berk in the sand and shows it to the Light Fury and their children. The Night Lights grow curious about the picture's origin and decide to fly to New Berk while their parents are sleeping. Toothless and the Light Fury wake up in a panic after finding out their children have left and fly off after them. Meanwhile, the Nights Lights arrive on New Berk and sneak around the village as the residents prepare for the pageant. Though they catch a glimpse of Hiccup, they retreat after mistaking the Toothless costume for their father. Toothless and the Light Fury eventually find them, but then decide to stay together and watch the pageant from a distance.

To Hiccup's dismay, Gobber portrays Stoick as the hero who united the Berkians and the dragons instead of him. Gobber accidentally lights the stage on fire during the performance, which sends Hiccup's costume out of control. Hiccup stumbles and falls off the cliff, but Toothless manages to rescue him and bring him back to the stage. With the smoke from the fire covering the stage, Toothless decides to fill in for Hiccup and helps Gobber end the show by reenacting the moment when he bonded with Hiccup, reminding New Berk and his family of the relationship the dragons had with the Vikings. After the show ends, Zephyr goes backstage to check on her father and ends up face-to-face with Toothless before he flies off with his family. Toothless' courteous and curious personality changes the way Zephyr views dragons.

Despite the pageant's disastrous performance, Hiccup and Astrid see that the youth of New Berk now have a newfound appreciation for both Stoick and the dragons. When they arrive at their home, they find a glowing crystal from the Hidden World and see that the bowl that contained Toothless' favorite fish is empty. They run outside and see Toothless and his family flying away from New Berk. Astrid decides to return the favor by having her, Hiccup, and their children visit Toothless and his family at the Hidden World.

== Cast ==
- Jay Baruchel as Hiccup Haddock III
- America Ferrera as Astrid Hofferson
- Craig Ferguson as Gobber the Belch
- Gerard Butler as Stoick the Vast
- Christopher Mintz-Plasse as Fishlegs Ingerman
- Zack Pearlman as Snotlout Jorgenson
- Justin Rupple as Tuffnut Thorston
- Liam Ferguson as Nuffink Haddock
- Madalyn Gonzalez as Zephyr Haddock

== Reception ==
Emily Ashby of Common Sense Media gave the film four stars out of five, saying "fans who have watched Hiccup's and Toothless's relationship develop over the course of the movie trilogy will find it a heartwarming addition to the saga with poignant sentiments about treasuring the people (and dragons) we love, especially around the holidays."

The short won for Best Animated Special Production at the 47th Annie Awards.
