= Julian Dennison =

New Zealand actor (born 2002)

Julian Bailey Dennison
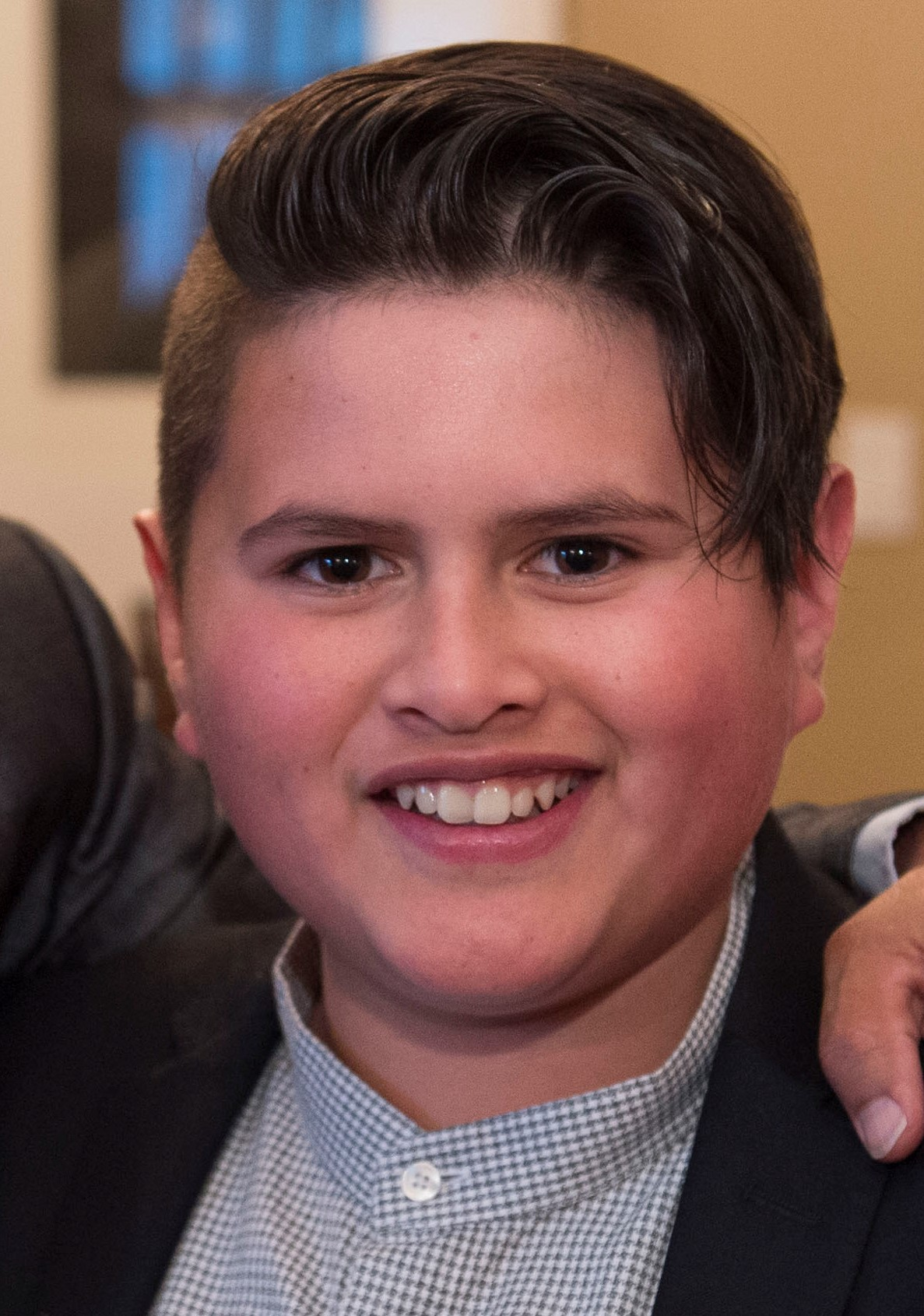
- Dennison in 2016
- Born: 26 October 2002 (age 24); Lower Hutt, Wellington, New Zealand
- Education: Hutt International Boys' School
- Occupation: Actor
- Years active: 2013–present
- Spouse: Christian Baledrokadroka (m. 2026)

Julian Bailey Dennison (born 26 October 2002) is a New Zealand actor. He starred in the 2013 film Shopping for which he won the Rialto Channel New Zealand Film Award for Best Supporting Actor in that year. He is known for his roles as Ricky Baker in Hunt for the Wilderpeople (2016), the highest-grossing New Zealand film in history, Russell "Firefist" Collins in Deadpool 2 (2018), and Belsnickel in The Christmas Chronicles 2. He also played Josh Valentine in Godzilla vs. Kong in 2021 and had a leading role in the film Uproar (2023). He also played Fishlegs in How to Train Your Dragon (2025).

== Life and career ==
Dennison was born and raised in Lower Hutt, and has a twin brother named Christian. Julian is of Māori descent and is a member of the Ngāti Hauā iwi (tribe), part of the Tainui tribal confederation. Dennison's mother Mabelle Dennison is an actress. He attended Naenae Primary School, where he first auditioned, and got his first part in the 2013 film Shopping. He was then cast in the Australian film Paper Planes (2015). He later attended Hutt International Boys' School in Upper Hutt.

Dennison continued with acting and was given a role in an advertisement for the NZ Transport Agency to discourage driving under the influence of drugs. The public service announcement, which became an internet sensation in New Zealand and Australia, was directed by Taika Waititi, who later asked Dennison to star in his film Hunt for the Wilderpeople (2016) without the need to audition. The film went on to become New Zealand's highest-grossing film to date, and was critically acclaimed.

Dennison played Rusty Collins (formerly Firefist) in the 2018 film Deadpool 2. He was cast because of his Wilderpeople performance, and the friendship of Waititi with Deadpool's filmmakers. In 2020, Dennison co-starred in The Christmas Chronicles 2, portraying Belsnickel and also voicing his elf form, and in 2021, he had a large supporting role in the monster sequel Godzilla vs. Kong. In 2023, he was cast in the A24 film Y2K.

Dennison played the main role of Josh Waaka in the film Uproar in 2023. His performance was praised by The Age, for its "admirable restraint". In an interview for The Post, Dennison stated that his lead role in Uproar was when "I felt like I was finding my voice". In January 2024, Dennison was announced to play Fishlegs Ingerman in the live-action remake of How to Train Your Dragon.

On 19 January 2026, Dennison married Christian Baledrokadroka in a private ceremony.

== Filmography ==
=== Film ===
Year	Title	Role	Notes
2013	Shopping	Solomon	
2015	Paper Planes	Kevin	
2016	Hunt for the Wilderpeople	Ricky Baker	
2016	Chronesthesia	Beni	a.k.a. Love and Time Travel
2018	Deadpool 2	Russell Collins / Firefist	
2020	The Christmas Chronicles 2	Belsnickel	
2021	Godzilla vs. Kong	Josh Valentine	
2023	Uproar	Josh Waaka	
2024	Y2K	Daniel "Danny" Bannon	
2025	How to Train Your Dragon	Fishlegs Ingerman	
2027	How to Train Your Dragon 2	Fishlegs Ingerman	Filming
TBA	Just Picture It	TBA	Filming

=== Television ===
Year	Title	Role	Notes
2016	Funny Girls	Himself	
2019–present	The Strange Chores	Pierce (voice)	Season One only
2024	Star Wars: The Bad Batch	Deke, Stak (voice)	Episode: "Paths Unknown"
