= Detroit Film Critics Society Award for Best Animated Feature =

Annual US film award

The Detroit Film Critics Society Award for Best Animated Feature is an annual award given by the Detroit Film Critics Society to honor the best animation of that year. The awards was first given in 2017, at the body's eleventh annual ceremony.

== Winners ==
indicates the winners.

=== 2010s ===
Year	Film	Director(s)
2017	The Lego Batman Movie	Chris McKay
2017	Captain Underpants: The First Epic Movie	David Soren
2017	Cars 3	Brian Fee
2017	Coco	Lee Unkrich
2017	Loving Vincent	Dorota Kobiela and Hugh Welchman
2018	Spider-Man: Into the Spider-Verse	Bob Persichetti, Peter Ramsey and Rodney Rothman
2018	Incredibles 2	Brad Bird
2018	Isle of Dogs	Wes Anderson
2018	Ralph Breaks the Internet	Rich Moore and Phil Johnston
2018	Smallfoot	Karey Kirkpatrick
2019	Toy Story 4	Josh Cooley
2019	Frozen 2	Chris Buck and Jennifer Lee
2019	How to Train Your Dragon: The Hidden World	Dean DeBlois
2019	I Lost My Body	Jérémy Clapin
2019	Klaus	Sergio Pablos

=== 2020s ===
Year	Film	Director(s)
2020	Soul	Pete Docter
2020	The Croods: A New Age	Joel Crawford
2020	Onward	Dan Scanlon
2020	Over the Moon	Glen Keane
2020	Wolfwalkers	Tomm Moore and Ross Stewart
2021	The Mitchells vs. the Machines	Mike Rianda
2021	Belle	Mamoru Hosoda
2021	Cryptozoo	Dash Shaw
2021	Encanto	Byron Howard and Jared Bush
2021	Flee	Jonas Poher Rasmussen
2021	Luca	Enrico Casarosa
