= Naomi Wirthner =

British actress

Naomi Wirthner is a British actress and theatre manager.

== Career ==
Wirthner trained in acting at the Bristol Old Vic Theatre School.

Wirthner's most prominent role was as Molly Doran in the Apple TV spy series Slow Horses. Alongside her co-stars, she received a nomination for the Screen Actors Guild Award for Outstanding Performance by an Ensemble in a Drama Series. She also had a role in the BBC series Crookhaven, and will next appear as Madam Malkin in HBO's Harry Potter.

== Personal life ==
Wirthner is an amputee, missing one of her legs from the knee down requiring the use of a prosthetic leg. Wirthner has two sons with actor Stephen Dillane, including the actor Frank Dillane.

== Filmography ==
=== Film ===
Year	Title	Role	Notes
2020	The Man in the Hat	The One Shoe'd Woman	
2023	The Unlikely Pilgrimage of Harold Fry	Kate	
2024	The Outrun	Amanda	
2025	How to Train Your Dragon	Gothi	
2025	H Is For Hawk	GP	
2026	Supergirl	Doctor	
2027	How to Train Your Dragon 2 †	Gothi	Post-production

=== Television ===
Year	Title	Role	Notes
1990	El C.I.D.	Nurse	1 episode
1993	Between the Lines	Mrs. Banthorpe	1 episode
1993	Wycliffe	Female Doctor	1 episode
1995	Soldier Soldier	Sandra Quinn	2 episodes
2002	Babyfather	Youth Officer	1 episode
2021	Alex Rider	Dr. Lambert	2 episodes
2022-present	Slow Horses	Molly Doran	Recurring role, 11 episodes
2023	The Continental: From the World of John Wick	Fake Mazie	Miniseries, 1 episode
2025	Missing You	Florence Khol	Miniseries, 3 episodes
2026	Crookhaven	Matilda Jericho	Recurring role, 7 episodes
2026	Harry Potter †	Madam Malkin	Upcoming series
TBA	The Husbands †	Edie	Upcoming series
