= Gabriel Howell =

British actor

- Born: 19 February 1999 (age 27); Hong Kong
- Citizenship: United Kingdom
- Education: Royal Academy of Dramatic Art (BA)
- Occupation: Actor
- Years active: 2021-present
- Television: Bodies

Gabriel Howell (born 19 February 1999) is a British actor. His television roles include a young Elias Mannix in the Netflix mystery thriller miniseries Bodies (2023) and Tobi McKnight in the BBC miniseries Nightsleeper. His film roles include Dennis in the 2022 film The Fence, and Snotlout Jorgenson in the 2025 film How to Train Your Dragon.

== Early life ==
Born in Hong Kong and raised in Bristol, England. Howell trained at the Royal Academy of Dramatic Art in London.

== Career ==
=== Stage ===
Howell was part of the original 2022 production of The Unfriend at the premiere at the Minerva Theatre, Chichester, written by Steven Moffat and with Mark Gatiss as director. He was then part of The Unfriend, as it transferred to be performed in 2023 in the West End at the Criterion Theatre, London, alongside Reece Shearsmith, Amanda Abbington and Frances Barber. Howell's performance in the role was described as “the perfect stage debut" in The Daily Telegraph.

He appeared in Nathan Englander's What We Talk About When We Talk About Anne Frank in 2024 at Theatre Royal, Marylebone, alongside Joshua Malina, directed by Patrick Marber.

=== Film and television ===
Howell had a role in the 2022 film The Fence, set in 1980s Bristol, from writer-director William Stone, adapted from his own previous short film, and featuring Sally Phillips.

He appeared as the young Elias Mannix in 2023 Netflix series Bodies and as Tobi McKnight, a computer whizz, in the 2024 BBC One series Nightsleeper.

He plays Snotlout Jorgenson, Hiccup's rival, in the 2025 adventure film How to Train Your Dragon.

== Filmography ==
Key
†	Denotes works that have not yet been released

𝗙𝗶𝗹𝗺

Year	Title	Role	Notes
2018	𝘚𝘶𝘯𝘣𝘢𝘵𝘩𝘪𝘯𝘨 𝘰𝘯 𝘢 𝘎𝘳𝘦𝘺 𝘋𝘢𝘺	Gus	Short Film
2018	𝘐𝘯 𝘛𝘩𝘪𝘴 𝘊𝘢𝘴𝘦, 𝘠𝘰𝘶 𝘊𝘢𝘯	Hunter	Short Film
2020	𝘕𝘰𝘵 𝘍𝘦𝘦𝘭𝘪𝘯𝘨 𝘉𝘭𝘶𝘦	Gareth	Short Film
2021	𝘚𝘬𝘦𝘵𝘤𝘩𝘪𝘯𝘨 𝘋𝘳𝘢𝘨𝘰𝘯𝘴	Charlie	Short Film
2022	The Fence	Dennis	Film
2025	𝘉𝘭𝘶𝘦𝘸𝘢𝘴𝘱𝘮𝘢𝘯	Shane	Short Film
2025	𝘏𝘰𝘸 𝘵𝘰 𝘛𝘳𝘢𝘪𝘯 𝘠𝘰𝘶𝘳 𝘋𝘳𝘢𝘨𝘰𝘯	Snotlout Jorgenson	Feature film
2026	𝘞𝘪𝘭𝘥 𝘉𝘰𝘥𝘪𝘦s †	Jonathan	Short Film
2027	𝘏𝘰𝘸 𝘵𝘰 𝘛𝘳𝘢𝘪𝘯 𝘠𝘰𝘶𝘳 𝘋𝘳𝘢𝘨𝘰𝘯 2 †	Snotlout Jorgenson	Feature film

𝗧𝗲𝗹𝗲𝘃𝗶𝘀𝗶𝗼𝗻

Year	Title	Role	Notes
2023	Bodies	Elias Mannix (age 15)	6 episodes
2024	Nightsleeper	Tobi McKnight	5 episodes
