= Bronwyn James =

English actress (born 1994)

- Born: July 24, 1994 (age 32); Wakefield, Yorkshire, England
- Occupation: Actress
- Years active: 2015–present
- Spouse: Katherine-Alice James (m. 2023)

Bronwyn James (born July 24, 1994) is an English actress. She is known for playing Shenshen in the musical films Wicked (2024) and Wicked: For Good (2025) as well as Ruffnut Thorston in the adventure film How to Train Your Dragon (2025).

== Education ==
James attended CAPA College, a performing arts school in Wakefield, West Yorkshire. In 2015, James graduated from the Academy of Live and Recorded Arts with a Bachelor of Arts degree in acting.

== Career ==
In 2015, James made her professional debut originating the role of Shirley in the Martin McDonagh play Hangmen. James had a recurring role as Fanny Lambert in the ITV Encore series Harlots from 2017 to 2019. She made her feature film debut in the 2017 drama Apostasy, directed by Daniel Kokotajlo (director). From 2018 to 2020, James appeared in the film Peterloo and the television series The ABC Murders, Sandylands, Ghosts, Outlander, and Call the Midwife. In 2019, James also starred opposite Rob Lowe in the ITV crime drama Wild Bill. Her next film roles were in the 2021 period dramas The Dig and The Colour Room. She had recurring roles on Cheaters and Lockwood & Co. in 2022 and 2023, respectively.

James featured as ShenShen in the musical fantasy films Wicked (2024) and Wicked: For Good (2025). She played Ruffnut Thorston in How to Train Your Dragon (2025).

== Personal life ==
In 2023, James married Katherine-Alice, founder of the Yorkshire-based nonprofit Hearts Collective, which promotes accessibility in the arts.

== Filmography ==
=== Film ===
Year	Title	Role	Notes	Ref.
2016	National Theatre Live: Hangmen	Shirley		
2017	Apostasy	Chloe		
2018	Peterloo	His Sister		
2020	Cindy	Cindy	Short film	
2021	The Dig	Ellen McKenzie		
2021	The Colour Room	Betty		
2023	The Palace	Magnolia		
2024	Wicked	ShenShen		
2025	Mickey 17	Receptionist		
2025	How to Train Your Dragon	Ruffnut Thorston		
2025	Wicked: For Good	ShenShen		
2027	How to Train Your Dragon 2	Ruffnut Thorston	Filming	

=== Television ===
Year	Title	Role	Notes	Ref.
2016	Cold Feet	Care Assistant	1 episode	
2016	Moving On	Grace	Episode: "Our House"	
2017–2019	Harlots	Fanny Lambert	Main role	
2018	The Queen and I	WPC Ludlow	Television film	
2018	Call the Midwife	Mavis Holler	Christmas Special 2018	
2018	The ABC Murders	Megan Barnard	3 episodes	
2019	Wild Bill	DC Muriel Yeardsley	Main role	
2019	The End of the F***ing World	Mac	1 episode	
2020	Outlander	Fanny Beardsley	Episode: "Free Will"	
2020	Sandylands	Trudy Wright	Main role (series 1)	
2020	Ghosts	Sam	Episode: "Perfect Day"	
2020	Meet the Richardsons	Pest Investigator	Christmas Special	
2021	Intergalactic	Vicky	1 episode	
2021	Silent Witness	Hannah Robson	2 episodes	
2022	Cheaters	Natalie	Recurring role (series 1)	
2022	This is Going to Hurt	Teri	1 episode	
2022	Compulsion	Ellie Gartree	1 episode	
2022	Slow Horses	Young Mum	Episode: "Fiasco"	
2023	Lockwood & Co.	Sergeant Wade	Recurring role	
2023	Still Up	Nurse Rose	Episode: "The Dress"	
2024	Masters of the Air	Susie	Episode: "Part Four"	
2024	Renegade Nell	Troupe Player 1	2 episodes	
