= Drangarnir =

Sea stacks of the Faroe Islands

- Sea stacks
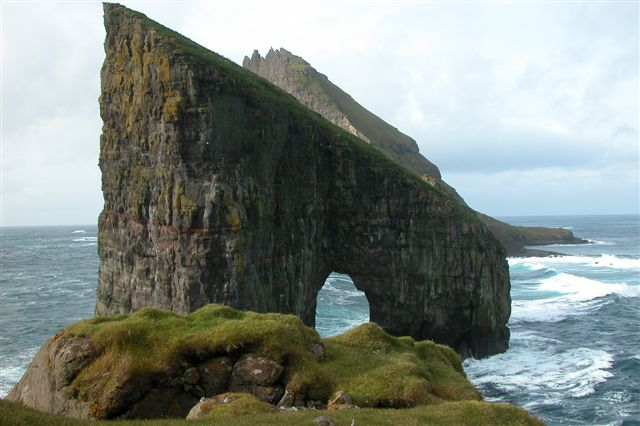
- Drangarnir with Tindhólmur visible behind it (2005)
- Interactive map of Drangarnir
- Coordinates: 62°4′31″N 7°24′52″W
- Location: Between Tindhólmur and Vágar of the Faroe Islands
- Elevation: 70 m (230 ft)

Drangarnir (lit. 'the sea stacks' in Faroese) is a pair of sea stacks in the North Atlantic Ocean, situated between Tindhólmur and Vágar of the Faroe Islands. The larger sea stack is named Stóri Drangur (lit. 'large sea stack') and the smaller Lítli Drangur (lit. 'small sea stack'). Drangarnir is located near the Faroe Islands' only airport and is a popular attraction among tourists to the archipelago, particularly due to Stóri Drangur's sea arch.

== Etymology ==
Drangarnir is a Faroese name that translates to "the sea stacks". The larger and more well-known of the two sea stacks is named Stóri Drangur, meaning "large sea stack", while the smaller one is named Lítli Drangur, meaning "small sea stack".

== Geography ==
Drangarnir is a pair of sea stacks situated between the islet of Tindhólmur and the island of Vágar in the Faroe Islands, an autonomous territory of Denmark. It rises from the North Atlantic Ocean to a maximum height of 70 metres (230 ft). The larger sea stack forms a sea arch.

== Fauna ==
Seabird rest and live on the basalt cliffs of Drangarnir during the summer months from May to September.

== Tourism ==
Drangarnir is a popular tourist attraction and is only accessible by boat. Visitors can reach Drangarnir by departing from the marina of Sørvágur, a village near Vágar Airport, the Faroe Islands' only airport. However, because the sea stacks are privately owned, visitors must be accompanied by a guide with permission from the landowners. A number of local businesses offer boat tours to the sea stacks. Drangarnir is also visible from a distance at the village of Bøur.

== In popular culture ==
In the 2010 animated fantasy film How to Train Your Dragon, the protagonist Hiccup flies his dragon Toothless under a sea arch inspired by Drangarnir. In the 2025 live-action remake, Hiccup and Toothless fly under the real-life Drangarnir.
