= Toronto Film Critics Association Awards 2019 =

Annual Canadian film awards ceremony

23rd Toronto Film Critics Association Awards
- Date: December 8, 2019

Highlights
- Best Picture: Parasite
- Most awards: Parasite

The 23rd Toronto Film Critics Association Awards, honoring the best in film for 2019, were awarded on December 8, 2019.

== Winners ==
Category	Winners and nominees	Films
Best Film	Bong Joon-ho	Parasite
Best Film	Noah Baumbach	Marriage Story
Best Film	Martin Scorsese	The Irishman
Best Canadian Film	Kathleen Hepburn and Elle-Máijá Tailfeathers	The Body Remembers When the World Broke Open
Best Canadian Film	Sophie Deraspe	Antigone
Best Canadian Film	Jasmin Mozaffari	Firecrackers
Best Actor	Adam Driver	Marriage Story
Best Actor	Antonio Banderas	Pain and Glory
Best Actor	Adam Sandler	Uncut Gems
Best Actress	Lupita Nyong'o	Us
Best Actress	Scarlett Johansson	Marriage Story
Best Actress	Renée Zellweger	Judy
Best Supporting Actor	Brad Pitt	Once Upon a Time in Hollywood
Best Supporting Actor	Willem Dafoe	The Lighthouse
Best Supporting Actor	Joe Pesci	The Irishman
Best Supporting Actress	Laura Dern	Marriage Story
Best Supporting Actress	Julia Fox	Uncut Gems
Best Supporting Actress	Florence Pugh	Little Women
Best Director	Bong Joon-ho	Parasite
Best Director	Noah Baumbach	Marriage Story
Best Director	Martin Scorsese	The Irishman
Best Screenplay	Steven Zaillian	The Irishman
Best Screenplay	Noah Baumbach	Marriage Story
Best Screenplay	Bong Joon-ho and Han Jin-won	Parasite
Best First Feature	Olivia Wilde	Booksmart
Best First Feature	Mati Diop	Atlantics
Best First Feature	Melina Matsoukas	Queen & Slim
Best Animated Film	Chris Butler	Missing Link
Best Animated Film	Chris Buck and Jennifer Lee	Frozen 2
Best Animated Film	Josh Cooley	Toy Story 4
Best Animated Film	Dean DeBlois	How to Train Your Dragon: The Hidden World
Best Foreign-Language Film	Bong Joon-ho	Parasite
Best Foreign-Language Film	Pedro Almodovar	Pain and Glory
Best Foreign-Language Film	Céline Sciamma	Portrait of a Lady on Fire
Best Documentary Film	Steven Bognar and Julia Reichert	American Factory
Best Documentary Film	Feras Fayyad	The Cave
Best Documentary Film	Todd Douglas Miller	Apollo 11
