= How to Train Your Dragon (2025 film) =

Film by Dean DeBlois

- Theatrical release poster
- Directed by: Dean DeBlois
- Screenplay by: Dean DeBlois
- Based on: How to Train Your Dragon by Cressida Cowell
- Produced by: Marc Platt; Adam Siegel
- Starring: Mason Thames; Nico Parker; Gabriel Howell; Julian Dennison; Bronwyn James; Harry Trevaldwyn; Peter Serafinowicz; Nick Frost; Gerard Butler
- Cinematography: Bill Pope
- Edited by: Wyatt Smith
- Music by: John Powell
- Production companies: Universal Pictures; DreamWorks Animation; Marc Platt Productions
- Distributed by: Universal Pictures
- Release dates: April 2, 2025 (CinemaCon); June 13, 2025 (United States)
- Running time: 125 minutes
- Countries: United States; United Kingdom; Iceland; Canada
- Language: English
- Budget: $150 million
- Box office: $636.6 million

How to Train Your Dragon is a 2025 fantasy film and a live-action remake of the 2010 animated film by DreamWorks Animation, itself loosely based on the 2003 novel by Cressida Cowell. It was written and directed by Dean DeBlois, who co-wrote and co-directed the original animated film. The film stars Mason Thames, Nico Parker, Gabriel Howell, Julian Dennison, Bronwyn James, Harry Trevaldwyn, Peter Serafinowicz, and Nick Frost, with Gerard Butler reprising his role from the animated film.

The film is set on the rugged Isle of Berk, where Vikings and dragons have been bitter enemies for generations. Hiccup (Thames), the inventive yet overlooked son of Chief Stoick the Vast (Butler), befriends Toothless, a feared Night Fury dragon. Their unlikely bond reveals the true nature of dragons, challenging the very foundations of Viking society.

Plans for a live-action remake of How to Train Your Dragon were announced in February 2023, with DeBlois returning to write and direct. Veteran composer John Powell also returned to score the remake. Thames and Parker joined the cast in May 2023, with additional casting announced in January 2024. Filming began later that month in Belfast, Northern Ireland and wrapped in May. It is DreamWorks Animation's first live-action film since it was spun off from the original live action studio in 2004.

How to Train Your Dragon premiered at CinemaCon on April 2, 2025, and was released by Universal Pictures in the United States on June 13. It received generally positive reviews from critics and grossed $636.4 million worldwide, becoming the eighth-highest-grossing film of 2025 and the second-highest-grossing live-action/animated hybrid of all time. It earned a nomination for Best Special Visual Effects at the 79th British Academy Film Awards. A sequel, titled How to Train Your Dragon 2 and based on the 2014 animated film, is scheduled to be released on June 11, 2027.

== Plot ==
Dragons frequently attack the Viking village of Berk, stealing livestock and endangering villagers. Hiccup Horrendous Haddock III, the 16-year-old outcast son of chieftain Stoick the Vast, attempts to create mechanical devices to overcome his physical weaknesses. During a dragon raid, Hiccup shoots down a rare dragon called a Night Fury with a bolas huge bow, but is disbelieved. Vowing to prove himself, Hiccup searches for the dragon to kill it. Upon seeing the dragon helpless and wounded, he compassionately releases him. To Hiccup's surprise, the angered dragon spares his life.

Meanwhile, Stoick rallies his fleet to destroy the dragons' nest. Before leaving, Stoick heeds the advice of his best friend and Hiccup's mentor, local blacksmith Gobber the Belch, and enrolls Hiccup in a dragon-fighting class with other local teens: Fishlegs Ingerman, Snotlout Jorgenson, the Thorston twins Ruffnut and Tuffnut, and Hiccup's crush, Astrid Hofferson. Hiccup is mocked by his peers and struggles in class. Returning to the forest, he finds the Night Fury trapped in a cove, unable to fly because Hiccup's bolas severed half of his tail fin. Hiccup befriends the dragon, naming him "Toothless" for his retractable teeth; he builds a harness, saddle, and prosthetic fin, allowing Toothless to fly with Hiccup riding on his back to guide him. Hiccup also learns about dragon behavior from Toothless, which allows him to subdue the captive training dragons, impressing the villagers, but arousing Astrid's suspicions.

Meanwhile, Stoick's fleet is damaged while searching for the nest, and returns to Berk. Upon learning he must kill a dragon for his final exam, Hiccup attempts to flee with Toothless, but Astrid discovers them. Hiccup takes her on a flight to show her Toothless' friendliness. During the flight, Toothless is drawn to a dragon's nest, where a gigantic Kaiju-sized dragon, the Red Death, commands smaller dragons to feed it to avoid being eaten themselves. Realizing the dragons attack Berk for survival, Astrid wants to inform the villagers, but Hiccup advises against it to protect Toothless. In his final exam, Hiccup faces a captive Monstrous Nightmare dragon called Hookfang. Rather than killing it, he attempts to publicly prove dragons can be peaceful, but Stoick inadvertently enrages Hookfang, causing Toothless to emerge from hiding to protect Hiccup. Stoick captures Toothless and disowns Hiccup after discovering the truth. Stoick binds Toothless to his ship and forces him to lead his fleet to the nest despite Hiccup's warnings. After reminding a distraught Hiccup he spared Toothless out of compassion, not cowardice, Astrid has Hiccup rally the other teens to tame the training dragons. Together, they pursue Stoick's fleet to the nest.

Stoick and his fleet locate and break open the nest, but the Red Death awakens and overpowers them. The dragon riders arrive to distract the Red Death while Hiccup attempts to free Toothless from a sinking ship. Stoick, realizing his horrible mistake, rescues both Hiccup & Toothless from drowning and apologizes to them. Hiccup & Toothless lure the Red Death into the air, damage its wing membranes, and set its insides alight, causing it to smash into the volcano and explode. The dying Red Death's tail hits Hiccup off Toothless, and he falls into the explosion's fireball. Toothless saves Hiccup from the explosion and they both survive, although Hiccup loses his left foot.

With the Red Death's threat over, the Berk villagers co-exist peacefully with the dragons. Gobber replaces Hiccup's foot and Toothless's fin with prosthetics, and Hiccup, now admired by his fellow villagers, begins a relationship with Astrid.

== Cast ==
- Mason Thames as Hiccup Horrendous Haddock III, the awkward 16-year-old son of Stoick the Vast
- Nico Parker as Astrid Hofferson, Hiccup's love interest and fellow student in dragon-fighting training
- Gerard Butler as Stoick the Vast, Berk's chieftain and Hiccup's father. Butler reprises his role from the animated films.
- Nick Frost as Gobber the Belch, Berk's blacksmith, Stoick's best friend and advisor, and teacher of the tribe's young dragon fighting recruits with customizable prosthetics that go over where his right hand used to be
- Gabriel Howell as Snotlout Jorgenson, dragon-fighting student who sees himself as Hiccup's rival
- Julian Dennison as Fishlegs Ingerman, dragon-fighting student and Hiccup's best friend who is obsessed with memorizing dragon statistics
- Bronwyn James as Ruffnut Thorston, dragon-fighting student and Tuffnut's twin sister
- Harry Trevaldwyn as Tuffnut Thorston, dragon-fighting student and Ruffnut's twin brother
- Peter Serafinowicz as Spitelout Jorgenson, Snotlout's father and Stoick's second-in-command
- Ruth Codd as Phlegma the Fierce, a member of the Viking village who lost half her right leg during one of the dragon fights.
- Naomi Wirthner as Gothi, the village elder
- Murray McArthur as Hoark, a member of the Viking village
- Andrea Ware as Burnheart, a member of the Viking village
- Anna Leong Brophy as Retcha, a member of the Viking village
- Marcus Onilude as Snorti, a member of the Viking village
- Peter Selwood as Drül, a member of the Viking village
- Daniel-John Williams as Fungi, a member of the Viking village
- Kate Kennedy as Flatula, a member of the Viking village
- Selina Jones as Loogi, a member of the Viking village
- Nick Cornwall as Hürl, a member of the Viking village
- Samuel Johnson as Skaldor, a member of the Viking village

== Production ==
=== Development ===
In February 2023, it was reported that a live-action adaptation of DreamWorks Animation's 2010 How to Train Your Dragon film, which was loosely based on Cressida Cowell's eponymous book series, was in development at Universal Pictures, with Dean DeBlois directing, writing and producing the film after previously writing and directing the animated entries, and Marc Platt and Adam Siegel joining as co-producers. DeBlois only accepted to direct the adaptation on the condition that he had full creative control. In November 2024, Forbes reported that Universal had spent over $50 million on pre-production for the film.

=== Casting ===
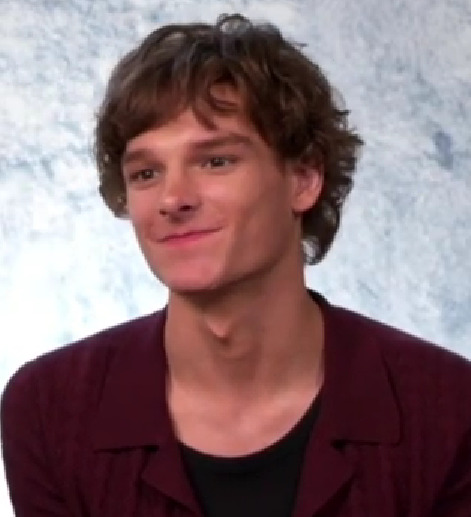
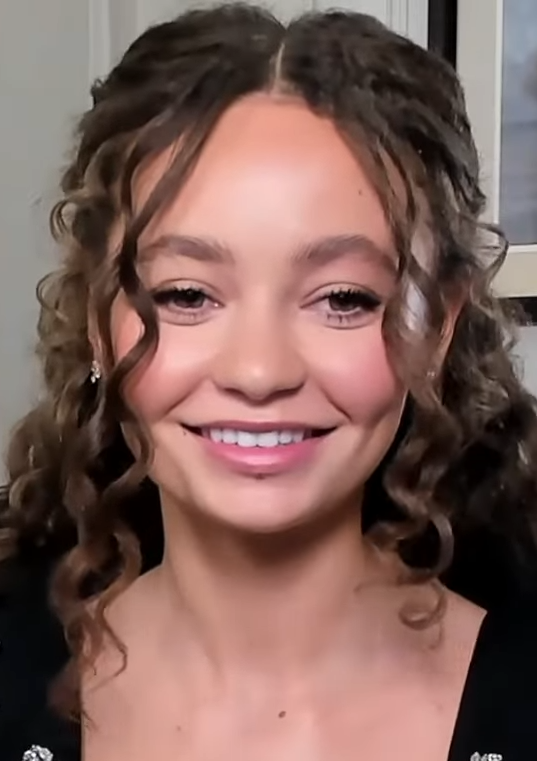
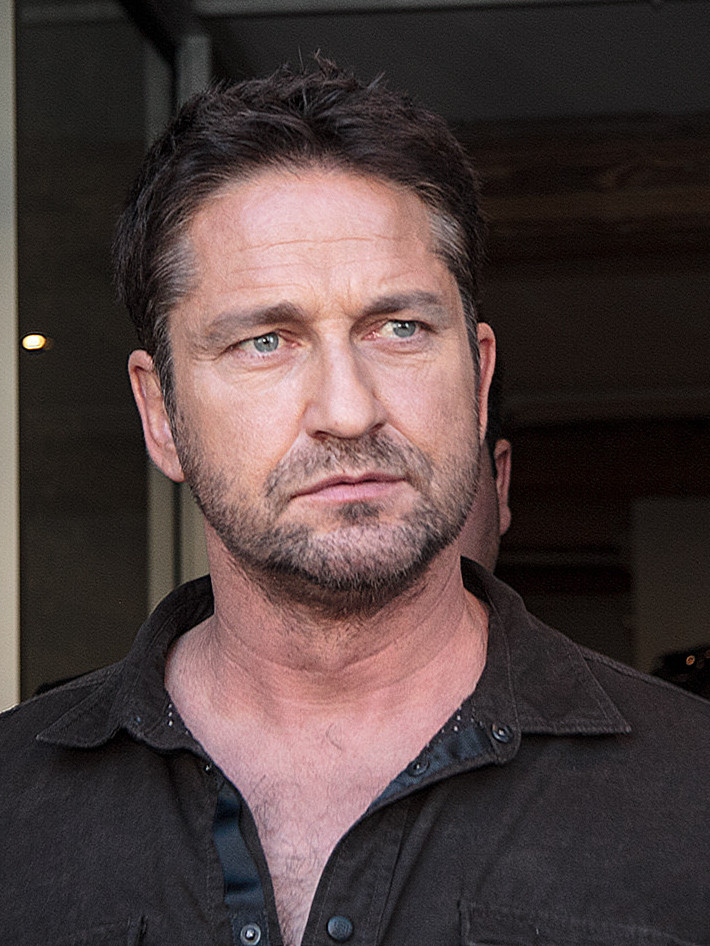
Mason Thames, Nico Parker, and Gerard Butler respectively portray Hiccup, Astrid, and Stoick.

In May 2023, it was announced that Mason Thames and Nico Parker had been cast to star as Hiccup and Astrid respectively. In January 2024, Gerard Butler was cast to reprise his role as Stoick the Vast from the animated films, with Nick Frost, Julian Dennison, Gabriel Howell, Bronwyn James, and Harry Trevaldwyn joining the cast later that same month, who were cast to play Gobber, Fishlegs, Snotlout, Ruffnut and Tuffnut, respectively. In March, Ruth Codd joined the cast of the film, portraying Phlegma.

=== Filming ===
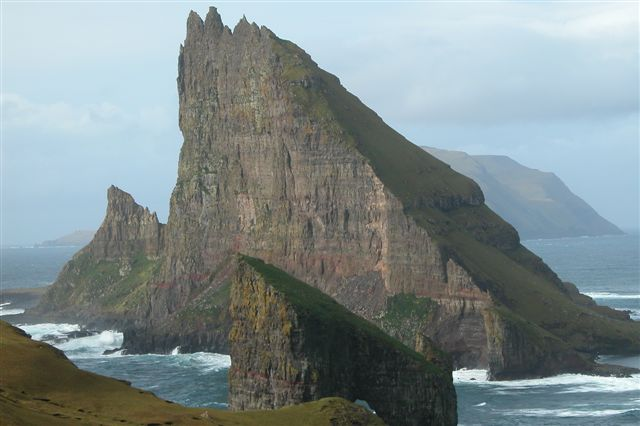
Tindhólmur

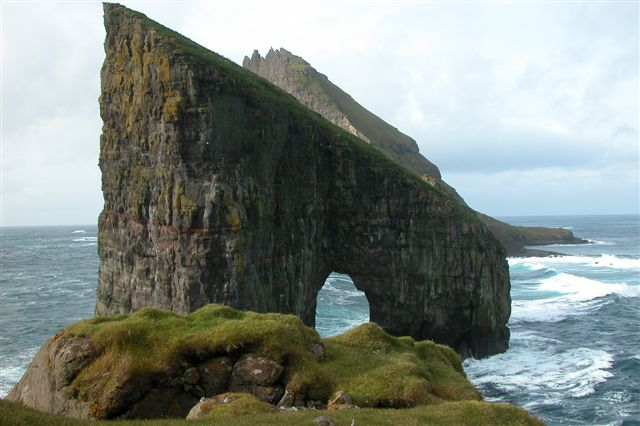
Drangarnir

Principal photography was originally scheduled to begin in July 2023 in Belfast, Northern Ireland, before it was postponed due to the 2023 SAG-AFTRA strike. After the strike concluded, screen tests were set for December 2023, with plans to begin production in mid-to-late January 2024. Filming began on January 15, 2024, and wrapped on May 16. Bill Pope served as the cinematographer. DeBlois originally contacted Roger Deakins, who served as a visual consultant on the animated films, about working on the live-action film, but when Deakins declined, he recommended Pope to DeBlois. Production was done with heavy use of practical sets and was filmed with the IMAX format in mind. Many scenes from the original film were re-created shot-for-shot in live-action form, notably Hiccup's first encounter with Toothless. To play the role of Stoick the Vast, Butler wore a massive costume that weighed 90 pounds.

Tindhólmur and Drangarnir of the Faroe Islands, which served as inspiration for Berk in the animated film, were used as filming locations for some of the flight scenes.

=== Post-production ===
Framestore was the sole visual effects company working on the film, splitting the work across the company's studios in London, Melbourne, Montreal and Mumbai. Christian Manz served as the production VFX supervisor.

To drive authentic performances between the cast and their dragons and to inform the work of the visual effects teams animating the dragons in post-production, puppets were used on set. Tom Wilton led a team of puppeteers whose on set performances allowed the cameramen to frame where the dragon would be while the actors had something to act against. The Framestore visual effects animation team also programmed eight-axis gimbals which were saddled up for the actors to ride with each of the dragon's heads attached during flight scenes. The gimbals allowed each rider to give performances unique to their dragon's flight cycle.

=== Music ===
In February 2023, John Powell revealed he was set to compose the film's music, after he previously scored the original film trilogy. The score was released through Back Lot Music day-and-date with the film on June 13, 2025, and was preceded by the single "Test Driving Toothless", which was adapted from the demo of the original film's soundtrack.

== Release ==
How to Train Your Dragon had its world premiere at CinemaCon inside The Colosseum at Caesars Palace in Las Vegas on April 2, 2025, as part of Universal Pictures' presentation of its 2025 theatrical slate. It had its first screening outside of the United States at the Sydney Film Festival on June 9, 2025, followed by a Los Angeles premiere at the Academy Museum of Motion Pictures on June 7, 2025, and a New York premiere at the 2025 Tribeca Festival on June 11, 2025.

The film was released theatrically by Universal in the United States on June 13, 2025, including engagements in RealD 3D, IMAX, Dolby Cinema, 4DX, ScreenX and D-Box. It was previously set for release on March 14, 2025, but due to the 2023 SAG-AFTRA strike, it was delayed to its June date. The film was dedicated to the memory of Gerard Butler's mother, Margaret Coll, who died earlier that year in February at the age of 81.

=== Marketing ===
The first look at the film was revealed in Empire's 2025 Preview on November 15, 2024, ahead of the release of the first teaser trailer in front of theatrical screenings of Wicked. The trailer was later released online on November 19, 2024, followed by a featurette introducing Dean DeBlois's vision in translating the story to the live-action medium. A new look at the film aired during Super Bowl LIX on February 9, 2025, ahead of the release of the official trailer on February 12, 2025, before being attached to showings of Captain America: Brave New World. An IMAX trailer was released on May 6, 2025.

Burger King released four menu items and BMW cars promoted the film.

=== Home media ===
How to Train Your Dragon was released for digital download on July 15, 2025, and on 4K Ultra HD Blu-ray, Blu-ray and DVD on August 12. The film first streamed on Peacock on October 10, 2025. Unlike Universal's other live-action films, which stream on Amazon Prime Video for the next ten months of the pay-TV window following their first four months on Peacock, this film streamed on Netflix starting on February 10, 2026, before returning to Peacock for the remaining four.

== Reception ==
=== Box office ===
How to Train Your Dragon has grossed $263 million in the United States and Canada, and $373.4 million in other territories, for a worldwide total of $636.4 million.

In the United States and Canada, the film was released alongside Materialists and was projected to gross $65–80 million from 4,000 theaters in its opening weekend. The film made $35.6 million on its first day, including $11.1 million from preview screenings. It went on to debut to $84.6 million, topping the box office and marking the best opening of the series. The film had the fourth-highest opening weekend of 2025 up to that point, behind A Minecraft Movie, Lilo & Stitch and Captain America: Brave New World. How To Train Your Dragon remained at the top of the box office in its second weekend with $37 million (a drop of 56.8%), beating out new releases 28 Years Later and Elio. In its third weekend, it was overtaken by F1 and grossed $19.6 million.

=== Critical response ===
On the review aggregator website Rotten Tomatoes, 78% of 259 critics' reviews are positive, with an average rating of 6.8/10. The website's consensus reads: "Crafted with loving fidelity to the animated classic by original co-director Dean DeBlois, How to Train Your Dragon doesn't best the first iteration but still reaches enchanting heights on its own." Metacritic, which uses a weighted average, assigned the film a score of 61 out of 100, based on 43 critics, indicating "generally favorable" reviews. Audiences polled by CinemaScore gave the film an average grade of "A" on an A+ to F scale, the same as the original animated film, while those surveyed by PostTrak gave it a 94% overall positive score, with 83% saying they would definitely recommend the film.

Brandon Yu of The New York Times gave the film a positive review and said, "This live action remake of the 2010 animated film is faithful to the original. The result is exhilarating at times, if somewhat mechanical." Dessi Gomez of Deadline Hollywood also gave the film a positive review and said, "While certain details in specific scenes were modified and some dialogue subtly shifted to enhance the story, the new version follows the original plot’s three-act structure to a tee." Helen O'Hara of Empire Magazine gave the film three stars out of five and said, "It's clearly made with real love and care, but shows far too much deference to its progenitor. Even in a remake, we need more originality and less playing the hits."

Kyle Smith of Wall Street Journal stated that "Mr. DeBlois's film harks back to the pre-Star Wars style of children's moviemaking, when the condescension of oversimplification was a defining attribute." Writing for Consequence, Liz Shannon Miller said, "To be clear, Dragon is not the worst live-action remake this year — congrats to Snow White on holding onto that prize. It's just a slightly distorted copy of what came before. Its best attributes are fully a credit to the original, while its worst qualities all come from the foolishness of adapting a movie that was just fine the way it was." Eric Goldman of IGN gave the film a 7 out of 10 and wrote, "The live-action How to Train Your Dragon can feel hemmed in by its faithfulness to the animated original, but it's re-creating that film's sense of heart and soul as well as its entire plot and most enduring images." Bilge Ebiri of Vulture gave the film a positive review and said, "All in all, this live-action adaptation works remarkably well — a rare feat."

Radheyan Simonpillai of The Guardian gave the film two stars out of five and said, "DreamWorks tries to find success with the Disney live-action remake template but falls short." Brian Tallerico of RogerEbert.com gave the film two stars out of four and wrote, "the new version of How to Train Your Dragon doesn't do a single thing better than the original. It's not quite as soulless as the worst of these live-action remakes."

=== Accolades ===
Accolades received by How to Train Your Dragon
Award	Date of ceremony	Category	Recipient(s)	Result	Ref.
Annie Awards	February 21, 2026	Outstanding Achievement for Character Animation in a Live Action Production	Kayn Garcia, Jean-Denis Haas, Meena Ibrahim, Nathan McConnel, and Nick Tripodi	Won	
Astra Creative Arts Awards	December 11, 2025	Best Visual Effects	Christian Manz, Glen McIntosh, Andy Kind, and Terry Palmer	Nominated	
Astra Creative Arts Awards	December 11, 2025	Best Stunts	How to Train Your Dragon	Nominated	
Astra Film Awards	January 9, 2026	Best Book to Screen Adaptation	How to Train Your Dragon	Nominated	
British Academy Film Awards	February 22, 2026	Best Special Visual Effects	Christian Manz, Glen McIntosh, Andy Kind, and Terry Palmer	Nominated	
Costume Designers Guild Awards	February 12, 2026	Excellence in Sci-Fi/Fantasy Film	Lindsay Pugh	Nominated	
Golden tomato Awards	January 13, 2026	Fan Favorite Movies	How to Train Your Dragon	Nominated	
Golden tomato Awards	January 13, 2026	Fan Favorite Family Movies	How to Train Your Dragon	Won	
Grammy Awards	February 1, 2026	Best Score Soundtrack for Visual Media	John Powell	Nominated	
Kids' Choice Awards	November 14, 2026	Favorite Movie	How to Train Your Dragon	Nominated	
Saturn Awards	March 8, 2026	Best Fantasy Film	How to Train Your Dragon	Nominated	
Saturn Awards	March 8, 2026	Best Film Visual / Special Effects	How to Train Your Dragon	Nominated	
Saturn Awards	March 8, 2026	Best Younger Performer in a Film	Mason Thames	Nominated	
Visual Effects Society Awards	February 25, 2026	Outstanding Visual Effects in a Photoreal Feature	Christian Manz, Christopher Raimo, Glen McIntosh, Glenn Melenhorst, Terry Palmer	Nominated	

== Sequel ==
On April 2, 2025, at CinemaCon, Universal Pictures announced that a live-action remake of the second film of the original animated trilogy, How to Train Your Dragon 2 (2014), was in development. The sequel, How to Train Your Dragon 2, was officially announced and scheduled for release on June 11, 2027. Filming began on January 26, 2026 in London.
