= Dean DeBlois =

Canadian filmmaker (born 1970)

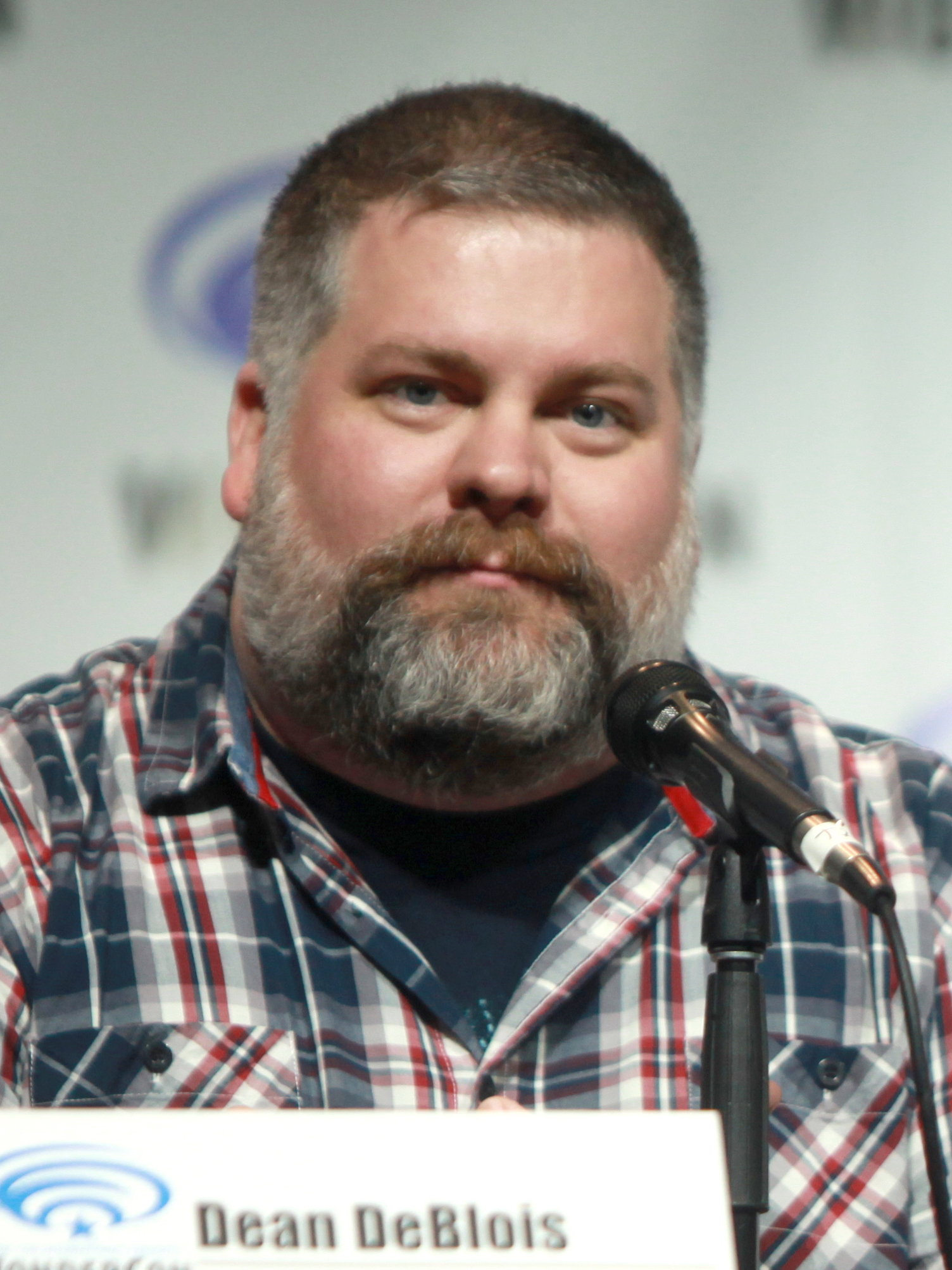
- Dean DeBlois at 2014 WonderCon
- Born: Dean Allan DeBlois; June 7, 1970 (age 56); Aylmer, Quebec, Canada
- Education: Sheridan College
- Occupations: Director; screenwriter; producer; animator
- Years active: 1988–present
- Employers: Sullivan Bluth Studios (1990–1994); Walt Disney Animation Studios (1994–2007); DreamWorks Animation (2007–present)

Signature
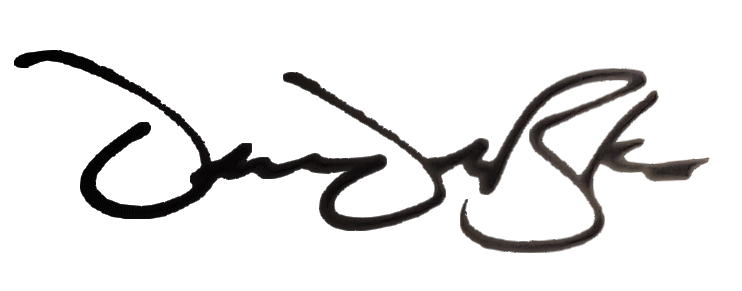

Dean Allan DeBlois (/dəˈblwɑː/ də-BLWAH; born June 7, 1970) is a Canadian filmmaker and animator. He is best known for co-writing and directing the Oscar-nominated animated feature films Lilo & Stitch (2002) for Walt Disney Animation Studios (with Chris Sanders), the How to Train Your Dragon films for DreamWorks Animation (the first film also with Sanders), and directing the documentary Heima (2007) about the Icelandic band Sigur Rós.

== Early life ==
DeBlois was born and raised in Aylmer, Quebec, Canada. As a boy, he was interested in comic books, which he later said influenced his drawing ability, imagination and storytelling. Growing up in poverty, he would visit a nearby smoke shop on weekends, where the proprietor let him read comics for free. Memorizing them, he went home and drew. DeBlois attended Darcy McGee High School.

== Career ==
DeBlois began his career as an assistant animator and layout artist for Hinton Animation Studios/Lacewood Productions in Ottawa, Ontario, while simultaneously attending Sheridan College's two year Classical Animation program in Oakville, Ontario. From 1988 to 1990, DeBlois contributed to such productions as The Raccoons (TV series), The Teddy Bears' Picnic (TV special), and The Nutcracker Prince (feature animated film).

Upon graduation from Sheridan College in 1990, DeBlois was hired by Sullivan Bluth Studios in Dublin, Ireland. There, he worked as a layout artist, character designer, and storyboard assistant to Don Bluth on such feature animated films as A Troll in Central Park and Thumbelina.

In 1994, DeBlois left Dublin for Los Angeles to begin work for Walt Disney Feature Animation as a storyboard artist, where he worked alongside his frequent collaborator, Chris Sanders, as Head of Story on Mulan. Shortly thereafter, they re-teamed to create Lilo & Stitch. DeBlois left production on Atlantis: The Lost Empire in order to work on Lilo & Stitch.

Following its release in 2002, DeBlois sold several original live action feature film projects to write, direct, and produce, including an Irish ghost story titled The Banshee and Finn Magee, a psychological thriller titled The Lighthouse (not to be confused with the 2016 and 2019 films titled The Lighthouse) and a family adventure series titled Sightings, which were optioned at Walt Disney Pictures, Touchstone Pictures, and Universal Studios respectively.

DeBlois' feature-length music documentary film Heima chronicles the homecoming concert of Iceland's Sigur Rós.

In October 2008, DeBlois returned to feature animation to co-write and co-direct DreamWorks Animation's then-troubled How to Train Your Dragon, once again re-teaming with Sanders. The duo re-envisioned the film's story and shepherded the production to its March 2010 release. The resulting film became the studio's top-grossing film in North America outside of the Shrek franchise.

During that same time, DeBlois also directed another feature-length music film for Sigur Rós front-man Jónsi, entitled Go Quiet, as well as a feature-length concert film entitled Jónsi: Live at The Wiltern.

DeBlois wrote and directed the fantasy/action film How to Train Your Dragon 2, a sequel to the original, which was released on June 13, 2014, followed by How to Train Your Dragon: The Hidden World on February 22, 2019.

On September 23, 2019, DeBlois was attached to write and direct a film adaptation of the Micronauts.

In February 2023, a live-action adaptation of How to Train Your Dragon was announced, with DeBlois set to write and direct, making the film his live action debut.

== Personal life ==
DeBlois is openly gay, and told The Advocate that people in the industry "knew that one of us was gay" but mistakenly assumed it was his heterosexual writing partner Chris Sanders, because DeBlois "hobbled in there looking like a redneck".

== Filmography ==
=== Films ===
Title	Year	Director	Writer	Producer	Notes
Mulan	1998	No	Story	No	credited as "Story Co-Head"
Lilo & Stitch	2002	Yes	Yes	No	alongside Chris Sanders
Heima (documentary)	2007	Yes	No	No	also camera operator
How to Train Your Dragon	2010	Yes	Yes	No	alongside Chris Sanders
Go Quiet (direct-to-video short)	2010	Yes	No	No	also camera operator & editor
How to Train Your Dragon 2	2014	Yes	Yes	Executive	
How to Train Your Dragon: The Hidden World	2019	Yes	Yes	Executive	
How to Train Your Dragon	2025	Yes	Yes	Executive	live action debut
How to Train Your Dragon 2	2027	Yes	Yes	Executive	Filming

==== Producer only ====
Title	Year	Notes
Gift of the Night Fury	2011	Executive producer Direct-to-video short
The Other Side of the Wind	2018	Co-producer
The Wild Robot	2024	Executive producer

==== Animation department ====
Title	Year	Notes
The Teddy Bears' Picnic (short direct-to-TV)	1989	assistant animator
The Nutcracker Prince	1990	assistant animator / layout artist
Thumbelina	1994	layout artist
The Lion King	1994	layout artist
A Troll in Central Park	1994	layout artist
Atlantis: The Lost Empire	2001	story artist

==== Acting only ====
Title	Year	Notes
How to Train Your Dragon	2025	Fat viking warrior

=== Television series ===
Title	Year	Credited as	Notes
The Raccoons	1989	assistant animator	9 episodes
Quack Pack	1996	character designer / storyboard artist / prop designer	7 episodes
Histeria!	1998–1999	storyboard artist	17 episodes

== Selected awards and nominations ==
Ceremony	Year	Category	Nominated work	Result	Ref.
3D Creative Arts Awards	2015	Best Feature Film – Animation	How to Train Your Dragon 2	Nominated	
3D Creative Arts Awards	2015	Best Stereoscopic Feature Film – Animation	How to Train Your Dragon 2	Won	
Academy Awards	2003	Best Animated Feature	Lilo & Stitch	Nominated	
Academy Awards	2011	Best Animated Feature	How to Train Your Dragon	Nominated	
Academy Awards	2015	Best Animated Feature	How to Train Your Dragon 2	Nominated	
Academy Awards	2020	Best Animated Feature	How to Train Your Dragon: The Hidden World	Nominated	
Annie Awards	2003	Outstanding Directing in a Feature Production	Lilo & Stitch	Nominated	
Annie Awards	2003	Outstanding Writing in a Feature Production	Lilo & Stitch	Nominated	
Annie Awards	2011	Outstanding Directing in a Feature Production	How to Train Your Dragon	Won	
Annie Awards	2011	Outstanding Writing in a Feature Production	How to Train Your Dragon	Won	
Annie Awards	2015	Best Animated Feature	How to Train Your Dragon 2	Won	
Annie Awards	2015	Outstanding Achievement for Directing in a Feature Production	How to Train Your Dragon 2	Won	
Annie Awards	2015	Outstanding Achievement for Writing in an Animated Feature Production	How to Train Your Dragon 2	Nominated	
Annie Awards	2020	Best Animated Feature	How to Train Your Dragon: The Hidden World	Nominated	
Annie Awards	2020	Outstanding Achievement for Writing in an Animated Feature Production	How to Train Your Dragon: The Hidden World	Nominated	
British Academy Children's Awards	2014	Kid's Vote — Film	How to Train Your Dragon 2	Nominated	
British Academy Children's Awards	2014	Feature Film	How to Train Your Dragon 2	Nominated	
BAFTA Awards	2011	Best Animated Film	How to Train Your Dragon	Nominated	
Chicago Film Critics Association Awards	2014	Best Animated Film	How to Train Your Dragon 2	Nominated	
Chicago Film Critics Association Awards	2019	Best Animated Film	How to Train Your Dragon: The Hidden World	Nominated	
Critics' Choice Movie Awards	2003	Best Animated Feature	Lilo & Stitch	Nominated	
Critics' Choice Movie Awards	2011	Best Animated Feature	How to Train Your Dragon	Nominated	
Critics' Choice Movie Awards	2015	Best Animated Feature	How to Train Your Dragon 2	Nominated	
Critics' Choice Movie Awards	2020	Best Animated Feature	How to Train Your Dragon: The Hidden World	Nominated	
Detroit Film Critics Society Awards	2019	Best Animated Feature	How to Train Your Dragon: The Hidden World	Nominated	
Florida Film Critics Circle Awards	2014	Best Animated Film	How to Train Your Dragon 2	Nominated	
Florida Film Critics Circle Awards	2019	Best Animated Film	How to Train Your Dragon: The Hidden World	Nominated	
Georgia Film Critics Association Awards	2015	Best Animated Feature	How to Train Your Dragon 2	Nominated	
Georgia Film Critics Association Awards	2020	Best Animated Feature	How to Train Your Dragon: The Hidden World	Nominated	
Golden Globe Awards	2011	Best Animated Feature Film	How to Train Your Dragon	Nominated	
Golden Globe Awards	2015	Best Animated Feature Film	How to Train Your Dragon 2	Won	
Golden Globe Awards	2020	Best Animated Feature Film	How to Train Your Dragon: The Hidden World	Nominated	
Hollywood Film Awards	2014	Hollywood Animation Award	How to Train Your Dragon 2	Nominated	
Hollywood Critics Association Awards	2020	Best Animated Film	How to Train Your Dragon: The Hidden World	Nominated	
Houston Film Critics Society Awards	2015	Best Animated Film	How to Train Your Dragon 2	Nominated	
Houston Film Critics Society Awards	2020	Best Animated Film	How to Train Your Dragon: The Hidden World	Nominated	
International Cinephile Society Awards	2015	Best Animated Film	How to Train Your Dragon 2	Nominated	
Movieguide Awards	2020	Best Movie for Families	How to Train Your Dragon: The Hidden World	Nominated	
National Board of Review Awards	2014	Best Animated Film	How to Train Your Dragon 2	Won	
National Board of Review Awards	2019	Best Animated Film	How to Train Your Dragon: The Hidden World	Won	
Nickelodeon Kids' Choice Awards	2015	Favorite Animated Movie	How to Train Your Dragon 2	Nominated	
Online Film Critics Society Awards	2014	Best Animated Film	How to Train Your Dragon 2	Nominated	
Online Film Critics Society Awards	2020	Best Animated Film	How to Train Your Dragon: The Hidden World	Nominated	
People's Choice Awards	2015	Favorite Family Movie	How to Train Your Dragon 2	Nominated	
People's Choice Awards	2019	Favorite Family Movie	How to Train Your Dragon: The Hidden World	Nominated	
Producers Guild of America Awards	2015	Best Animated Motion Picture	How to Train Your Dragon 2	Nominated	
San Diego Film Critics Society Awards	2014	Best Animated Film	How to Train Your Dragon 2	Nominated	
San Diego Film Critics Society Awards	2019	Best Animated Film	How to Train Your Dragon: The Hidden World	Nominated	
San Francisco Bay Area Film Critics Circle Awards	2019	Best Animated Feature	How to Train Your Dragon: The Hidden World	Nominated	
San Francisco Film Critics Circle Awards	2014	Best Animated Feature	How to Train Your Dragon 2	Nominated	
Satellite Awards	2015	Best Animated or Mixed Media Feature	How to Train Your Dragon 2	Nominated	
Satellite Awards	2019	Best Animated or Mixed Media Feature	How to Train Your Dragon: The Hidden World	Nominated	
Saturn Awards	2015	Best Animated Film	How to Train Your Dragon 2	Nominated	
Saturn Awards	2019	Best Animated Film	How to Train Your Dragon: The Hidden World	Nominated	
Seattle Film Critics Society Awards	2019	Best Animated Feature	How to Train Your Dragon: The Hidden World	Nominated	
Seattle International Film Festival Awards	2014	Golden Space Needle Award – Best Film	How to Train Your Dragon 2	Second runner-up	
St. Louis Film Critics Association Awards	2014	Best Animated Feature	How to Train Your Dragon 2	Nominated	
St. Louis Film Critics Association Awards	2019	Best Animated Feature	How to Train Your Dragon: The Hidden World	Nominated	
Toronto Film Critics Association Awards	2014	Best Animated Film	How to Train Your Dragon 2	Nominated	
Toronto Film Critics Association Awards	2019	Best Animated Film	How to Train Your Dragon: The Hidden World	Nominated	
Visual Effects Society Awards	2015	Outstanding Visual Effects in an Animated Feature	How to Train Your Dragon 2	Nominated	
Washington D.C. Area Film Critics Association Awards	2014	Best Animated Feature	How to Train Your Dragon: The Hidden World	Nominated	
Washington D.C. Area Film Critics Association Awards	2019	Best Animated Feature	How to Train Your Dragon: The Hidden World	Nominated	
