= How to Train Your Dragon: The Hidden World =

2019 DreamWorks Animation film

- Theatrical release poster
- Directed by: Dean DeBlois
- Written by: Dean DeBlois
- Based on: How to Train Your Dragon by Cressida Cowell
- Produced by: Brad Lewis; Bonnie Arnold
- Starring: Jay Baruchel; America Ferrera; F. Murray Abraham; Cate Blanchett; Gerard Butler; Craig Ferguson; Jonah Hill; Christopher Mintz-Plasse; Kristen Wiig; Kit Harington
- Edited by: John K. Carr
- Music by: John Powell
- Production company: DreamWorks Animation
- Distributed by: Universal Pictures
- Release dates: January 3, 2019 (Australia); February 22, 2019 (United States)
- Running time: 104 minutes
- Country: United States
- Language: English
- Budget: $129 million
- Box office: $540 million

How to Train Your Dragon: The Hidden World is a 2019 American animated fantasy film written and directed by Dean DeBlois, based on the book series by Cressida Cowell. Produced by DreamWorks Animation, it is the sequel to How to Train Your Dragon 2 (2014) and the final installment of the How to Train Your Dragon trilogy. Jay Baruchel, America Ferrera, Cate Blanchett, Craig Ferguson, Gerard Butler, Jonah Hill, Christopher Mintz-Plasse, Kristen Wiig, and Kit Harington reprise their roles from the first two films, with F. Murray Abraham joining the cast. The film follows 21-year-old Hiccup (Baruchel) seeking a dragon utopia known as the "Hidden World" while coming to terms with Toothless's new bond with a female Fury, as they deal with the threat of Grimmel the Grisly (Abraham), a ruthless dragon hunter.

Discussions regarding a third How to Train Your Dragon film began in December 2010, with DeBlois later stating that the second film was being intentionally designed as the second act of a trilogy. The animation challenges of the production required DreamWorks Animation to update and invent new software to handle complex tasks, such as lighting the Light Fury dragon.

How to Train Your Dragon: The Hidden World was released theatrically in Australia on January 3, 2019, and in the United States on February 22, 2019, by Universal Pictures. Like its predecessors, it received positive reviews, with critics considering it a satisfying conclusion to the trilogy, with praise for its animation, voice acting, score, and emotional weight. The film grossed $540 million, and received several accolades, including five Annie Awards nominations, a Golden Globe nomination, and a nomination for Best Animated Feature at the 92nd Academy Awards.

== Plot ==
A year after becoming chieftain, (Note: As depicted in How to Train Your Dragon 2 (2014)) Hiccup, his Night Fury Toothless, and their fellow dragon-riders continue to rescue captured dragons to bring them to Berk. However, the island has become overpopulated with dragons and faces constant attacks by dragon hunters. In response, Hiccup desires to find the "Hidden World", a safe haven for dragons once spoken of by his late father, Stoick. Meanwhile, a white female Light Fury, held captive by warlords, is given to an infamous dragon hunter named Grimmel the Grisly as bait for him to capture Toothless for the warlords' use as an alpha.

Toothless finds the Light Fury in the woods, and they become enchanted until she flees, sensing Hiccup and Astrid nearby. Later, Hiccup and Tuffnut discover Grimmel's dragon traps. That night, Grimmel visits Hiccup, demanding Toothless while boasting of killing nearly every Night Fury to extinction. Hiccup, having prepared an ambush, faces Grimmel, who escapes as his Deathgripper dragons destroy Hiccup's house and Berk. Hiccup then leads the citizens and dragons to seek the Hidden World for safety from hunters.

Mid-journey, the Berkians discover an island on which they initially plan to rest, but soon begin to settle there, dubbing it "New Berk". Seeing Toothless' inability to fly solo hindering his growing relationship with the Light Fury, Hiccup rebuilds an automatic tailfin for him. (Note: Hiccup had previously built an automatic tailfin for Toothless but Toothless later discarded it, as depicted in the short film Gift of the Night Fury (2011)) Upon receiving it, Toothless flies off, meeting up with the Light Fury and flying with her to an unknown land. On a scouting patrol, Valka notices Grimmel's approaching army and reports back to Hiccup. Hiccup and the dragon riders head to capture Grimmel, but fall into his trap and barely escape, except Ruffnut, who irritates Grimmel until he lets her go.

Hiccup, Astrid, and Stormfly search for Toothless and find the Hidden World, where Toothless has become the alpha of the dragons there with the Light Fury as his mate. When the resident dragons spot Hiccup and Astrid, they attack the duo, but Toothless saves them and returns to New Berk. Hiccup realizes that humans would be intruders and are unsafe in the Hidden World. Ruffnut returns but unknowingly leads Grimmel right to them. He captures Toothless and the Light Fury, who had followed Toothless back to the island. Grimmel uses Toothless's alpha status to capture Berk's dragons by threatening to kill the Light Fury if he does not comply.

With Astrid's support, Hiccup joins the dragon riders to thwart Grimmel and his army. They surprise Grimmel's forces while gliding on wingsuits, sparking a battle to rescue the dragons. Hiccup, aided by Stormfly, frees Toothless as Grimmel drugs the Light Fury and flies off with her. Hiccup and Toothless chase Grimmel, defeating his Deathgrippers with lightning, but Grimmel tranquilizes Toothless midair, making him fall. Realizing he needs help, Hiccup frees the Light Fury and urges her to save Toothless before falling with Grimmel towards the ocean. The Light Fury saves Toothless and returns to rescue Hiccup, who removes his prosthetic leg that Grimmel was holding onto before being carried away, leaving him to die from the impact. Back on the island, Toothless and Hiccup acknowledge that dragons are not safe in the human world and that humans are forbidden in the Hidden World. Hiccup shares a heartfelt goodbye with Toothless as the Berkians release their dragons to the Hidden World. Months later, Hiccup and Astrid marry and become New Berk's chieftains.

A decade later, Toothless and the Light Fury have mated and hatched three hybrid dragon fledglings called Night Lights. Hiccup and Astrid, along with their daughter and son, (Note: Later revealed to have been named Zephyr and Nuffink in the short film How to Train Your Dragon: Homecoming (2019)) sail across the sea to visit them at the edge of the Hidden World. After introducing his children to his old friend, Hiccup and Astrid take their children flying on Toothless and Stormfly, accompanied by the Light Fury and their offspring. Hiccup vows that, until humans and dragons are ready to co-exist peacefully, the dragons will stay hidden while the Berkians guard their secret.

== Voice cast ==
- Jay Baruchel as Hiccup Horrendous Haddock III, the son of Valka and the late Stoick the Vast, the newly crowned Viking chief of Berk, and the one who initially trained the dragons
  - A.J. Kane as younger Hiccup
- America Ferrera as Astrid Hofferson, Hiccup's fiancee
- F. Murray Abraham as Grimmel the Grisly, an infamous dragon hunter who is responsible for the near-extinction of the Night Furies
- Cate Blanchett as Valka Haddock, a dragon rescuer, Hiccup's mother, and Stoick’s widow, now living on Berk after twenty years of isolation
- Gerard Butler as Stoick the Vast, the late father of Hiccup, late husband of Valka, and Berk's previous chieftain, as seen in flashbacks
- Craig Ferguson as Gobber the Belch, a seasoned warrior, blacksmith, and dragon dentist
- Jonah Hill as Snotlout Jorgenson, a brash, overconfident, and fairly unintelligent but reliable friend of Hiccup
- Christopher Mintz-Plasse as Fishlegs Ingerman, an enthusiastic friend of Hiccup knowledgeable in dragon lore, which he often relates in a role-playing game style
- Kristen Wiig as Ruffnut Thorston, Tuffnut's fraternal twin who is friends with Hiccup
- Justin Rupple as Tuffnut Thorston, Ruffnut's fraternal twin who is friends with Hiccup. He was originally voiced by T.J. Miller in the first two films and the television series. Miller was originally set to return for the third film, but DreamWorks chose to recast his role after he was accused of sexual assault and arrested for calling in a fake bomb threat. Rupple was brought on to dub over Miller's lines.
- Kit Harington as Eret, Son of Eret, a former dragon hunter who used to work for Drago Bludvist, who has joined the dragon riders after the events of the second film
- Julia Emelin as Griselda the Grievous, an aggressive warlord who works with Grimmel
- Ólafur Darri Ólafsson as Ragnar the Rock, an incompetent warlord who works with Grimmel
- James Sie as Chaghatai Khan, a less aggressive and stubborn warlord who works with Grimmel
- David Tennant as Ivar the Witless, a dragon trapper who works for the Warlords
  - Tennant also voices Spitelout Jorgenson, the father of Snotlout
- Robin Atkin Downes as Ack, a blond-bearded Viking
- Kieron Elliot as Hoark, a Viking with a knotted beard
- Ashley Jensen as Phlegma the Fierce, a female Viking who works as a botanist at the School of Dragons
- Gideon Emery as a trapper
- Randy Thom as vocal effects for Toothless, Stormfly and Light Fury

== Production ==
In December 2010, DreamWorks Animation CEO Jeffrey Katzenberg announced that there would also be a third film in the series: "How To Train Your Dragon is at least three: maybe more, but we know there are at least three chapters to that story." Dean DeBlois, the writer and director of the second and the third film, stated that How to Train Your Dragon 2 was being intentionally designed as the second act of the trilogy: "There are certain characters and situations that come into play in the second film that will become much more crucial to the story by the third." DeBlois said in an interview that the third part would be released in 2016. Although the series has taken a different path of telling a story of Hiccup and Vikings, author Cressida Cowell revealed that the trilogy and the book series will have similar endings (with "an explanation as to why dragons are no more").

The film was produced by Bonnie Arnold and Brad Lewis. DeBlois and Chris Sanders were the executive producers; Sanders was an executive producer of the second film and co-director of the first. Jay Baruchel, Gerard Butler, Craig Ferguson, America Ferrera, Jonah Hill, Christopher Mintz-Plasse and Kristen Wiig returned in the third film, with Justin Rupple replacing T.J. Miller as Tuffnut. DeBlois revealed that Miller did originally return to voice Tuffnut, but DreamWorks recast him after the actor's sexual assault allegations and arrest for calling in a fake bomb threat. Cate Blanchett also reprised her role as Valka from the second film. On November 14, 2017, it was announced that Kit Harington would reprise his role as Eret and F. Murray Abraham had joined the cast. During the earlier stages of production, DeBlois stated that Djimon Hounsou would also return as Drago Bludvist. It was initially planned for Drago to have been redeemed by the end of the film; however, halfway through development, DreamWorks co-founder Steven Spielberg convinced DeBlois that the story of Drago's redemption required more screen time that they could not provide, causing his inclusion to be scrapped. On April 17, 2018, DreamWorks Animation announced that the sequel's title would be How to Train Your Dragon: The Hidden World. The animation challenges of the production required DreamWorks Animation to update and invent new software to handle complex tasks, such as lighting the Light Fury dragon.

=== Music ===
Like the previous two films, the film's score was composed by John Powell. In addition, Powell's collaborators Batu Sener, Anthony Willis, and Paul Mounsey are credited as additional composers. Also returning from the previous films, Jónsi wrote a new song for the film, titled "Together from Afar", which was released as a single on January 31, 2019. Jónsi also provided vocals for a track titled "The Hidden World".

== Release ==
In September 2012, 20th Century Fox, DreamWorks Animation's then-distributor and the studio itself announced that the film was originally going to be released on June 17, 2016. In September 2014, the film's release date was pushed back a year from its original release date of June 17, 2016, to June 9, 2017. DeBlois explained the release date shifts as such: "It's just that these movies take three years. I think it was a little ambitious to say 2016... As is normally the case, they kind of throw darts out into the future and wherever they land they call that a release date until we start talking about it in practical terms, and then it's like, 'Uh yeah that's not enough time'. So knowing that they take three years from this moment, from outlining and writing the screenplay through to the final lighting of it, it's just a process of building models and doing tests and animating, storyboarding, the whole thing just adds up to about three years."

In January 2015, the release date was pushed back a year again from June 9, 2017, to June 29, 2018, following DreamWorks Animation's corporate restructuring and lay-offs meant to maximize the company's "creative talent and resources, reduce costs, and drive profitability." On June 18, 2016, the release date was moved up from June 29, 2018, to May 18, 2018, taking the release date of the Warner Animation Group's The Lego Movie 2: The Second Part. On December 5, 2016, the United States release date was pushed back from May 18, 2018, to March 1, 2019. The release date was moved up for the final time from March 1, 2019, to February 22, 2019, taking the slot of The Turning, a live-action DreamWorks film which in turn was pushed back to January 24, 2020.

How to Train Your Dragon: The Hidden World was the first DreamWorks Animation film to be distributed by Universal Pictures, following Comcast and NBCUniversal's acquisition of DreamWorks Animation in 2016.

=== Home media ===
How to Train Your Dragon: The Hidden World was first released digitally in the United States on digital download on May 7, 2019, and was first released physically in the United States on 4K Ultra HD Blu-ray, Blu-ray, and DVD by Universal Pictures Home Entertainment on May 21, 2019. Digital and physical copies contain two different 2018 short films titled Bilby and Bird Karma.

=== Video games ===
Unlike the first two films of the trilogy, How to Train Your Dragon: The Hidden World does not have a tie-in game based on its plot. Instead, there are two games set before the events of the film, which are the top-down action adventure game DreamWorks Dragons: Dawn of New Riders available on consoles and personal computers (Nintendo Switch, PlayStation 4, Xbox One and Microsoft Windows) and the match-3 game Dragons: Titan Uprising for mobile devices (iOS and Android).

== Reception ==
=== Box office ===
How to Train Your Dragon: The Hidden World grossed $160.9 million in the United States and Canada, and $379 million in other territories, for a worldwide gross of $540 million, against a production budget of $129 million. Deadline Hollywood calculated the film's net profit as $130 million, accounting for production budgets, marketing, talent participations, and other costs; box office grosses and home media revenues placed it 12th on their list of 2019's "Most Valuable Blockbusters".

In the United States and Canada, How to Train Your Dragon: The Hidden World held early screenings at 1,000 theaters on February 2, 2019, and grossed $2.5 million, one of the highest advance showing totals ever. It was released alongside the wide expansion of Fighting with My Family, and was initially projected to gross $40–45 million from 4,259 theaters in its opening weekend. After making $17.5 million on its first day (including $3 million from Thursday night previews), weekend projections were increased to $60 million. It went on to debut to $55 million finishing first at the box office. The film made $30 million in its second weekend, retaining the top spot, before being dethroned by newcomer Captain Marvel in its third.

The film grossed $1.5 million on its opening day in Australia, setting a record for a DreamWorks Animation film in that country (surpassing Shrek 2). In New Zealand, the film grossed $173,000 on its opening day, ranking as DreamWorks Animation's second biggest opening day in the country, behind Shrek 2. By its third weekend of international release the film has grossed a total of $41 million. As of March 24, 2019, the film's largest markets in other territories were China ($53.7 million), Russia ($26.8 million), France ($25.0 million), United Kingdom ($24.8 million) and Mexico ($21.0 million).

=== Critical response ===
On review aggregation website Rotten Tomatoes, the film holds an approval rating of 90% based on 271 reviews, and an average rating of 7.3/10. The website's critical consensus reads, "The rare trilogy capper that really works, How to Train Your Dragon: The Hidden World brings its saga to a visually dazzling and emotionally affecting conclusion." On Metacritic, the film has a weighted average score of 71 out of 100, based on 42 critics, indicating "generally favorable" reviews. Audiences polled by CinemaScore gave the film an average grade of "A" on an A+ to F scale (the same score earned by the first two films), while those at PostTrak gave it a 90% positive score and a 77% "definite recommend".

Jennifer Bisset of CNET praised the voice performances of the main characters, while also citing the visuals and action sequences, and singled out the development of the relationship between Hiccup and Toothless, saying, "Continuing a series-long focus on family and love, How to Train Your Dragon: The Hidden World narrows on what those values mean for Toothless. He experiences romance. He grows up. And with heavy, satisfied hearts, we let him, and Hiccup, go."

Michael Nordine of IndieWire gave the film a B, saying, "Directed once again by Dean DeBlois, The Hidden World strikes a bittersweet chord in reminding its young audience that all good things — including the age of dragons — must come to an end." He later went on to applaud the CGI, lauding the "arresting visuals", and stating that "The animation itself is striking — an early sequence in which the sky is filled with dragons is an early sign of the visual treats to come — and ends up being the film's highlight." Ben Kenigsberg of The New York Times gave a positive review of the characters and emotional messages of the film, writing "More bittersweet and less triumphal than its predecessors, and directed by a returning Dean DeBlois, The Hidden World concerns the exigencies that Hiccup faces as a leader, both politically and personally. If you truly love that dragon you trained, its message says, let him go."

Conversely, some critics felt the film had the presence of too many juggled sub-plots and an obligatory ending, with Movie Crypt concluding that "Fans will enjoy seeing their characters grown and progressing as story arcs are closed, but the final resolution rings hollow. Ultimately, none of it appeared necessary other than a need to say goodbye; the dragons and their champions certainly earned a better conclusion than that." Kerry Lengel of The Arizona Republic says that "The plot is thin and holey and the characters are mostly just a single gag set on repeat" and calls it "a lazy effort".

=== Accolades ===
Accolades received by How to Train Your Dragon: The Hidden World
Award	Date of ceremony	Category	Recipient(s)	Result	Ref.
Academy Awards	February 9, 2020	Best Animated Feature	Dean DeBlois, Bonnie Arnold, and Brad Lewis	Nominated	
Annie Awards	January 25, 2020	Best Animated Feature	How to Train Your Dragon: The Hidden World	Nominated	
Annie Awards	January 25, 2020	Outstanding Achievement for Character Animation in a Feature Production	Dane Stogner and Rani Naamani	Nominated	
Annie Awards	January 25, 2020	Outstanding Achievement for Production Design in an Animated Feature Production	Pierre-Olivier Vincent, Kirsten Kawamura, Woonyoung Jung, and Iuri Lioi	Nominated	
Annie Awards	January 25, 2020	Outstanding Achievement for Writing in an Animated Feature Production	Dean DeBlois	Nominated	
Annie Awards	January 25, 2020	Outstanding Achievement for Editorial in an Animated Feature Production	John K. Carr, Mark Hester, and Mary Blee	Nominated	
Art Directors Guild Awards	February 1, 2020	Excellence in Production Design for an Animated Film	Pierre-Olivier Vincent	Nominated	
Artios Awards	January 30, 2020	Animation	Christi Soper Hilt	Nominated	
Chicago Film Critics Association Awards	December 14, 2019	Best Animated Film	How to Train Your Dragon: The Hidden World	Nominated	
Cinema Audio Society Awards	January 25, 2020	Outstanding Achievement in Sound Mixing for a Motion Picture – Animated	Tighe Sheldon, Scott R. Lewis, Shawn Murphy, Gary Rizzo, and Blake Collins	Nominated	
Critics' Choice Movie Awards	January 12, 2020	Best Animated Feature	How to Train Your Dragon: The Hidden World	Nominated	
Detroit Film Critics Society Awards	December 9, 2019	Best Animated Feature	How to Train Your Dragon: The Hidden World	Nominated	
Florida Film Critics Circle Awards	December 23, 2019	Best Animated Film	How to Train Your Dragon: The Hidden World	Nominated	
Georgia Film Critics Association Awards	January 10, 2020	Best Animated Film	How to Train Your Dragon: The Hidden World	Nominated	
Golden Globe Awards	January 5, 2020	Best Animated Feature Film	How to Train Your Dragon: The Hidden World	Nominated	
Golden Reel Awards	January 19, 2020	Outstanding Achievement in Sound Editing – Sound Effects, Foley, Dialogue and ADR for Animated Feature Film	Randy Thom, Brian Chumney, Leff Lefferts, Al Nelson, Jonathan Borland, Malcolm Fife, Dee Selby, Jana Vance, and Geoff Vaughan	Nominated	
Golden Trailer Awards	May 29, 2019	Best Animation/Family TV Spot	"Heroes" (Inside Job)	Nominated	
Golden Trailer Awards	May 29, 2019	Most Original TV Spot	"New Year's Eve" (MOCEAN)	Nominated	
Golden Trailer Awards	May 29, 2019	Best Original Score TV Spot	"Last Ride" (Buddha Jones)	Nominated	
Hollywood Critics Association Awards	January 9, 2020	Best Animated Film	How to Train Your Dragon: The Hidden World	Nominated	
Hollywood Music in Media Awards	November 20, 2019	Original Score – Animated Film	John Powell	Won	
Hollywood Music in Media Awards	November 20, 2019	Original Song – Animated Film	John Powell and Jónsi for "Together From Afar"	Nominated	
Houston Film Critics Society Awards	January 2, 2020	Best Animated Film	How to Train Your Dragon: The Hidden World	Nominated	
International Film Music Critics Association Awards	February 20, 2020	Best Original Score for an Animated Film	John Powell	Nominated	
Movieguide Awards	January 24, 2020	Best Movie for Families	How to Train Your Dragon: The Hidden World	Nominated	
National Board of Review Awards	December 3, 2019	Best Animated Film	How to Train Your Dragon: The Hidden World	Won	
Online Film Critics Society Awards	January 6, 2020	Best Animated Film	How to Train Your Dragon: The Hidden World	Nominated	
People's Choice Awards	November 10, 2019	Favorite Family Movie	How to Train Your Dragon: The Hidden World	Nominated	
People's Choice Awards	November 10, 2019	Animated Movie Star	America Ferrera	Nominated	
Producers Guild of America Awards	January 18, 2020	Best Animated Motion Picture	Brad Lewis and Bonnie Arnold	Nominated	
San Diego Film Critics Society Awards	December 9, 2019	Best Animated Film	How to Train Your Dragon: The Hidden World	Nominated	
San Francisco Bay Area Film Critics Circle Awards	December 16, 2019	Best Animated Feature	How to Train Your Dragon: The Hidden World	Nominated	
Satellite Awards	December 19, 2019	Best Animated or Mixed Media Feature	How to Train Your Dragon: The Hidden World	Nominated	
Saturn Awards	September 13, 2019	Best Animated Film	How to Train Your Dragon: The Hidden World	Nominated	
Seattle Film Critics Society Awards	December 16, 2019	Best Animated Feature	How to Train Your Dragon: The Hidden World	Nominated	
Society of Composers & Lyricists Awards	January 7, 2020	Outstanding Original Score for a Studio Film	John Powell	Nominated	
St. Louis Film Critics Association Awards	December 15, 2019	Best Animated Film	How to Train Your Dragon: The Hidden World	Nominated	
Toronto Film Critics Association Awards	December 8, 2019	Best Animated Film	How to Train Your Dragon: The Hidden World	Nominated	
Visual Effects Society Awards	January 29, 2020	Outstanding Created Environment in an Animated Feature	Chris Grun, Ronnie Cleland, Ariel Chisholm, and Philippe Brochu for "The Hidden World"	Nominated	
Visual Effects Society Awards	January 29, 2020	Outstanding Effects Simulations in an Animated Feature	Derek Cheung, Baptiste Van Opastal, Youxi Woo, and Jason Mayer for "Water and Waterfalls"	Nominated	
Washington D.C. Area Film Critics Association Awards	December 8, 2019	Best Animated Feature	How to Train Your Dragon: The Hidden World	Nominated	
World Soundtrack Awards	October 18, 2019	Best Original Score of the Year	John Powell	Nominated	
World Soundtrack Awards	October 18, 2019	Public Choice Award	John Powell	Won	

== Spin-offs ==
A short film titled How to Train Your Dragon: Homecoming was released on December 3, 2019. Set before the epilogue of The Hidden World, it depicts Hiccup and Astrid teaching their children about the friendship between humans and dragons in order to protect their legacy.

An animated television series, titled Dreamworks Dragons: The Nine Realms, premiered in October 2021, and ran for eight seasons, concluding in December 2023. Set 1,300 years after The Hidden World, it depicts the adventures of Tom Kullerson, Hiccup and Astrid's descendant, along with his friends and his dragon Thunder, who is a descendant of Toothless and the Light Fury.
