= How to Train Your Dragon (novel series) =

Series of children's books written by Cressida Cowell

- Cover of the first edition of How to Train Your Dragon
- 1. How to Train Your Dragon; 2. How to Be a Pirate; 3. How to Speak Dragonese; 4. How to Cheat a Dragon's Curse; 5. How to Twist a Dragon's Tale; 6. A Hero's Guide to Deadly Dragons; 7. How to Ride a Dragon's Storm; 8. How to Break a Dragon's Heart; 9. How to Steal a Dragon's Sword; 10. How to Seize a Dragon's Jewel; 11. How to Betray a Dragon's Hero; 12. How to Fight a Dragon's Fury
- Author: Cressida Cowell
- Country: United Kingdom
- Language: English
- Genre: Fantasy, young adult fiction, coming of age
- Publisher: Hodder Children's Books (UK); Little, Brown and Company (US)
- Published: 2003–2015
- Media type: Print (hardback & paperback); Audiobook

How to Train Your Dragon is a series of children's books written by the British author Cressida Cowell. The books are set in a fictional Fantasy Viking world, and focus on the experiences of protagonist Hiccup Horrendous Haddock the Third, as he overcomes obstacles on his journey of "becoming a hero, the hard way". The books were published by Hodder Children's Books in the UK and by Little, Brown and Company in the United States. The first book was published in 2003 and the 12th and final one in 2015.

By 2015, the series had sold more than seven million copies around the world. The books have subsequently been adapted into a media franchise consisting of three animated feature films, several television series, a live-action remake, and other media, all produced by DreamWorks Animation.

== Books ==
Cowell has published twelve full novels, based around the adventures of a young Viking named Hiccup Horrendous Haddock the Third. The first book was published in 2003, and the last book was released in 2015. All the books have titles based around an instruction guide.

Book Number	Title	Release year
1	How to Train Your Dragon	2003
2	How to Be a Pirate	2004
3	How to Speak Dragonese	2005
4	How to Cheat a Dragon's Curse	2006
5	How to Twist a Dragon's Tale	2007
6	A Hero's Guide to Deadly Dragons	2007
7	How to Ride a Dragon's Storm	2008
8	How to Break a Dragon's Heart	2009
9	How to Steal a Dragon's Sword	2011
10	How to Seize a Dragon's Jewel	2012
11	How to Betray a Dragon's Hero	2013
12	How to Fight a Dragon's Fury	2015

=== Midquel series ===
A spin-off midquel series, How to Train Your Dragon School, set between the sixth and seventh books, began publication in 2025.

Book Number	Title	Release year
6.1	How to Train Your Dragon School: Doom of the Darkwing	2025
6.2	How to Train Your Dragon School: Fight of the Flamestrike	2026

=== Related books ===
1. How to Train Your Viking, by "Toothless the Dragon" (2006)
2. The Day of the Dreader (2012)
3. The Incomplete Book of Dragons: A Guide to Dragon Species (2014, UK) / The Complete Book of Dragons: A Guide to Dragon Species (2014, US)
4. How to Train Your Hogfly (2023)
5. When the Windwalker Changed (2024)

Cowell published the supplementary spin-off stories as part of the series: The Day of the Dreader is a short story published in 2012 and the novella How to Train Your Viking was published as part of World Book Day 2006 and is claimed to be written by the dragon Toothless and translated by Cowell. Both of these titles were published in the US as part of the May 2014 How to Train Your Dragon Special Edition: With Brand New Short Stories! paperback movie tie-in edition. A picture book, Hiccup the Seasick Viking published in 2000, is not considered a part of the series despite featuring the same character of Hiccup. An illustrative guide to the dragon world, titled The Incomplete Book of Dragons, was released in June 2014 (in the US it is titled The Complete Book of Dragons). How to Train Your Hogfly was published as a short story in How to Train Your Dragon's 20th anniversary edition in 2023. When the Windwalker Changed was published as part of How to Train Your Dragon: Dragon Tales Collection (2024). A spin-off series, How to Train Your Dragon School, set between A Hero's Guide to Deadly Dragons and How to Ride a Dragon's Storm, was first published in 2025. Cowell cites the Scottish Inner Hebrides islands and stories of Scandinavian Scotland as inspirations for the book.

=== Related picture book ===
1. Hiccup: The Viking Who Was Seasick (1999, UK) / Hiccup: The Seasick Viking (2000, US), released on audio under the title How to Be a Viking

=== Related early reader books ===
DreamWorks also published 6 early reader books based on the movies; these were not written by Cressida Cowell. They are:

- How to Start a Dragon Academy
- How to Pick Your Dragon
- How to Raise Three Dragons
- How to Track a Dragon
- How to Defend Your Dragon
- How to Build a Dragon Fort

== Characters ==
=== Overview ===
List indicators
- A dark grey cell indicates that the character was not in the property or that the character's presence in the property has yet to be announced.
- A Main indicates a character had a starring role in the property.
- A Supporting indicates the character appeared in two or more times within the property.
- A Guest indicates the character appeared once in the property.

Character
Character	Hiccup: TVWWS	HtTYD	HtBAP	HtSD	HtCaDC	HtTaDT	AHGTDD	HtRaDS	HtBaDH	HtSaDS	HtSaDJ	HtBaDH	HtFaDF
Character	1999	2003	2004	2005	2006	2007		2008	2009	2011	2012	2013	2015
Character	Main characters												
Hiccup Horrendous Haddock the Third	Main	Main	Main	Main	Main	Main	Main	Main	Main	Main	Main	Main	Main
Stoick the Vast	Main	Main	Main	Main	Main	Main	Main	Main	Main	Main	Main	Main	Main
Toothless Daydream		Main	Main	Main	Main	Main	Main	Main	Main	Main	Main	Main	Main
Fishlegs		Main	Main	Main	Main	Main	Main	Main	Main	Main	Main	Main	Main
Gobber the Belch		Main	Main	Main	Main	Main	Main	Main	Main	Main	Main	Main	Main
Snotface Snotlout		Main	Main	Main	Main	Main	Main	Main	Main	Main	Main	Main	Mentioned
Camicazi				Main	Main	Main	Main	Main	Main	Main	Main	Main	Main
Valhallarama		Guest	Mentioned	Mentioned	Mentioned	Guest	Mentioned	Mentioned	Mentioned	Mentioned	Main	Main	Main
Antagonists
Merciless the Green Death		Main	Mentioned							Guest			
Alvin the Treacherous			Main	Main	Mentioned	Main	Mentioned	Mentioned	Main	Main	Main	Main	Main
Norbert the Nutjob					Main			Main					Guest
Hairy Scary Librarian		Guest				Guest	Guest				Supporting		
Excellinor the Witch									Main	Main	Main	Main	Main
Vikings
Old Wrinkly		Main	Main	Main	Main	Main		Supporting	Supporting	Supporting		Guest	Guest
Dogsbreath the Duhbrain		Main	Supporting	Supporting	Supporting	Supporting	Supporting	Supporting	Supporting	Supporting	Supporting		
Thuggory the Meathead		Main								Guest	Supporting	Supporting	Supporting
Big-Boobied Bertha				Main	Supporting	Supporting	Supporting	Supporting	Supporting			Supporting	
Mogadon the Meathead		Supporting	Supporting			Supporting				Supporting	Supporting		Supporting
Madguts the Murderous						Main	Supporting	Supporting		Supporting			
Humungously Hotshot the Hero						Main	Mentioned	Mentioned	Main				Supporting
Dragons
Horrorcow		Main	Supporting	Supporting		Supporting		Supporting		Supporting			Guest
Fireworm		Main	Supporting	Supporting		Supporting			Supporting	Supporting	Guest	Guest	Guest
Stormfly							Main	Supporting	Supporting	Supporting	Supporting	Supporting	Supporting
Windwalker						Supporting			Supporting	Supporting	Supporting	Supporting	Supporting
Furious									Main	Main	Main	Main	Main
Wodensfang										Main	Main	Main	Main
Patience											Main	Main	Main
Innocence											Main	Main	Main
Arrogance											Main	Main	Main

=== Main ===
- Hiccup Horrendous Haddock the Third (in books 1–12) is the protagonist of the books. Near the start of the series, his fellow Vikings see him as useless and weak, unappreciative of his quick wit and strategy. He is unusual for a Viking not only physically, being very thin with bright red hair, but also intellectually, as he thinks before he acts and is unusually clever. He is one of the only people ever to understand and be able to speak Dragonese, the language of the dragons. Later, Hiccup becomes a formidable sword fighter and unconventional hero, earning the respect of his peers.
- Toothless (in books 1–12) is Hiccup's hunting-dragon. He appears to be an astoundingly small green Common-or-Garden Dragon with no teeth, marking him as one of the King's Lost Things. He is arrogant and childlike, initially refusing to follow commands and disobeying Hiccup. As the series progresses, he becomes more loyal and loving to Hiccup yet never loses his arrogance. In book 11, he is revealed to be a young Seadragonus Giganticus Maximus. This is changed in the DreamWorks franchise, where Toothless is a Night Fury.
- Fishlegs (in books 1–12) is Hiccup's best friend. He has numerous medical conditions including an allergy to reptiles that make him clumsy and prone to sneezing. Like Hiccup, he is shunned by the other Vikings and seen as a wimp, but shows himself to be quite astute and cunning when he needs to be. Possessing a frequently-displayed sarcastic wit, he is also fond of poetry and aspires to become a bard in later books. He is not a Hooligan by blood but an orphan who washed up on Berk's shores as an infant, his parentage a mystery that is only solved near the end of the series.
- Camicazi (in books 3–12) is a fierce, impulsive and mischievous sword fighter that is the heir of the tribe of female warriors known as the Bog-Burglars. She is very skilled at escapes, burglary and sword fighting. She is in many ways the opposite of Hiccup, as she does not think about situations before jumping into them. Hiccup pulls her back, and she, in return, pushes him forward, convincing Hiccup to trust his instincts. In the DreamWorks franchise, she is renamed Astrid, both depicted as the owner of the dragon Stormfly and very close to Hiccup.
- Stoick the Vast (in books 1–12) is Hiccup's father and the Chief of the Hairy Hooligans, their tribe. Unlike his son, he is incredibly strong and beefy but rather unintelligent. However, he grows throughout the course of the books to become more open-minded and attempts to understand his son better. He owns two dragons, Newtsbreath and Hookfang. Stoick also has another dragon called Bullheart who appears exclusively in the ninth book.
- Snotface Snotlout (in books 1–11), is Hiccup's much-despised cousin. He bullies and bosses the others around, especially Fishlegs and Hiccup whom he addresses as "Hiccup the Useless and his fishlegged failure of a friend". He is top class at 'Bashyball', 'Advanced Rudery' and 'everything else'. His dragon is a Monstrous Nightmare named Fireworm, who because of her breed should technically belong to Hiccup (as the son of the Chief) according to ancient Viking law. He gets killed in an attack at the end of Book 11 in an attempt to help Hiccup become King of the Wilderwest. Later, Hiccup silently forgives Snotlout for the years of rivalry between them. Upon Hiccup informing the Vikings of his sacrifice, he is posthumously honored by the Vikings as a hero.
- Valhallarama (in books 1, 5, 10–12) is Hiccup's mother. She appears in only a few books, and is often away Questing. She once loved Humungously Hotshot the Hero and gave him a ruby heart necklace (which turns out to be one of the King's Lost Things). She reappears in Book 10 to help Hiccup become King of the Wilderwest.
- Gobber the Belch (in books 1–12) is the hulking, violent and temperamental Viking in charge of the Viking Initiation Programme (later on the Pirate Training Programme) and is described in book 5 as "a six-and-a-half-foot ax-wielding lunatic who was not the kind of teacher you argued with". At the beginning of the first few books, he gives his lessons in extreme situations, such as a storm in book 2. In later books, he is an extremely loyal member of the Company of the Dragonmark (Hiccup's followers to become King of the Wilderwest).

=== Vikings ===
- Dogsbreath the Duhbrain (in books 1–10) is Snotlout's friend and sidekick bully. He is usually seen following Snotlout's orders, usually the difficult and tedious jobs. He is not very intelligent and does not talk much. His dragon is a Gronckle named Seaslug.
- Mogadon the Meathead (in books 1, 2, 5, 9, 10 and 12) is Chief of the Meathead Tribe, close neighbors of the Hairy Hooligans. A man with a fake leg and an eyepatch, he shares a sometimes vicious rivalry with Stoick.
- Thuggory the Meathead (in books 1, 9–12) is Mogadon's son, and very like Snotlout. Although he is large, muscular, well-respected and has a huge silver Monstrous Nightmare dragon called Killer, he stands up for Hiccup and works with him in the first book. Later, in Book 10, he becomes the first member of Hiccup's Company of the Dragonmark (excluding Valhallarama who founded it).
- Alvin the Treacherous (in books 2–3, 5, 8–12) is Hiccup's Archenemy and rival to become King of the Wilderwest. Introduced as a sly, attractive charmer, he increasingly becomes more openly ruthless and impulsive as his adversity to Hiccup increases. He used to be Chief of the Outcast Tribe in book 2 and was again in books 9–12. He is the main antagonist in books 2–3, 5, and is joined by Excellinor the Witch (his mother) in books 8–12. Although he is a fantastic sword fighter, he is frequently losing parts of his body such as all of his hair, a hand, a foot, a nose, and an eye (as the results of his encounters with Hiccup), and becomes increasingly disfigured by warts (caught from his mother) across the final four books. He is also Fishlegs' father by Termagant, as revealed by the final book. He is claimed by the Dragon Guardians.
- Norbert the Nutjob (in books 4, 7, 12) is the Chief of the Hysterical Tribe, and Hiccup's second worst enemy. Norbert's father, Bigjob, once went to America and retrieved a potato, but Hiccup took it to cure Fishlegs of Vorpentitis. As his name suggests, he is insane and uses his giant axe – one gold side and one black side – to decide everything. He appears in the last book disguised as a Wanderer, his survival never explained.
- Humungously Hotshot the Hero (in books 5, 8, 12) is a suave, debonair adventurer and lothario acclaimed as a legendary hero across the Archipelago. He was trapped on the island of Lava-Louts for 15 years. He went out on a quest to find the fire stone for Hiccup's grandfather, Old Wrinkly, so he could marry Hiccup's mother, Valhallarama. He failed, and after Valhallarama marries Stoick the Vast eventually marries Tantrum O'UGerly, the daughter of UG the Uglithug in book 8.
- Big-Boobied Bertha (in books 3–8, 11) is the leader of the Bog-Burglars and the mother of Camicazi. As her name indicates, she has very large breasts and it is mentioned that "These bosoms have killed before and will kill again...".
- Madguts the Murderous (in books 5–7, 9) is the Chief of the Murderous Tribe. A vicious, frightening, vile-smelling man covered in skull tattoos and with "Hate" on the knuckles of both his hands, he is considered one of the scariest men in the Barbarian Archipelago. He also never speaks (though he spoke to Mogadon the Meathead in the fifth book). He has a stealth dragon stolen from him by Bertha and intends to kill her, and later tries to legally kill Stoick and Bertha in the seventh book. Both times he is stopped by Hiccup. Camicazi supposedly burgles from him regularly.
- Excellinor (in books 8–12) is Alvin's witch of a mother. She is pure evil and wants Hiccup's sword. It is said that she never took good care of Alvin the Treacherous and never loved him either. She was locked in a tree trunk for twenty years by UG the Uglithug. Her name was unknown until the ninth book. She is the cause of Alvin's warts and is covered in them. She uses Vampire Spydragons as spies for her. At the end of the final book, she falls into a deep blowhole in the ground and presumably dies there.
- Old Wrinkly (in books 1–5, 7–9, 11, 12), is Valhallarama's father and Hiccup's grandfather. Old Wrinkly is the soothsayer and doctor of the Hairy Hooligans tribe and only trusted thinker of the Tribe, despite the frequently-contested reliability of his soothsaying and advice. Between the beginning of Book 9 and the end of Book 11, it is unknown what came of him. He appears in the twelfth and final book.

=== Dragons ===
- Horrorcow (in books 1–3, 5, 7, 9, 12) is Fishlegs's hunting dragon of the Basic Brown species. She is named 'Horror' for effect and 'Cow' because she is not dangerous and sleeps a lot. Fishlegs suspects she is a vegetarian. She is three times the size of Toothless and is his best dragon friend. She spends much of the series clinging in fright to Fishlegs' head. When she climbs down from Fishleg's head during Book 9, she is not mentioned again until the end of the final book, explaining that she hated the violence of the war and so hid underground until it was all over.
- Fireworm (in books 1–3, 5, 8–9) is Snotlout's completely immodest and temperamental dragon. She is a red Monstrous Nightmare and immensely dislikes Toothless, often jeering in Dragonese, prodding and attacking him. She joins the Dragon Rebellion in Book 9.
- Stormfly (in books 6–12,) is Camicazi's dragon. Stormfly is a Mood-Dragon, allowing her to change colour depending on her mood; when angry, she will turn blue-black, and when lying, she turns purple. Stormfly is unusual in that she speaks in Norse, but she is, as Fishlegs calls her, a pathological liar making it apparent when she is lying. Toothless has a crush on Stormfly.
- Windwalker (in books 5, 8–12) is the dragon Hiccup rides. Windwalker is fiercely loyal to Hiccup, even through terrifying situations. His type of dragon enters a chrysalis stage. It is unknown what happens to them after that.
- Wodensfang (in books 9–12) is an ancient brown dragon, living from when Hiccup Horrendous Haddock I lived. He is a wise dragon, whom Hiccup the Third meets while getting the Crown. He is able to understand and speak (happens in the 11th book) Norse and helps Hiccup in his quest to stop the Rebellion. In the eleventh book, it is revealed that he is an extremely ancient Seadragonus Giganticus Maximus.
- Patience, Innocence and Arrogance (in books 10–12) is a triple-headed Deadly Shadow dragon. He can camouflage. He is an Air dragon. He was Termagant's (Fishlegs' mother's) riding dragon, and he swore to look after Fishlegs when he was a baby and set out to sea. The two are reunited in book 10 and he officially becomes Fishlegs's dragon. The three heads have individual personalities.
- Furious (in books 8–12) is a Seadragonus Giganticus Maximus that started and is the leader of the Dragon Rebellion and continuously tries to chase down Hiccup. He was the Dragon-Brother of Hiccup Horrendous Haddock The Second, and becomes Hiccup Horrendous Haddock III's blood brother at the end of the final book, shortly before his death from the poisoned Stormblade sword, which Alvin's mother thrust into him. His death is what finalizes the peace between Vikings and dragons.

Hooligan family tree

Previous generations of Hooligan Family
Hiccup Horrendous Haddock The First
1,000 years of Hooligan family generations
Grimbeard; The Ghastly (Note: Grimbeard the Ghastly, O Hear His Name and Tremble, Ugh. Ugh. Chief of the Hooligan Tribe and King of the Wilderwest)	Chinhilda (Note: Chinhilda, Queen of the Wilderwest and Ghost of the Bay of the Broken Heart)	Mother Grimler	Father Grimler
Thugheart (Note: Thugheart, the founder and chief of the Treacherous Tribe)	Sychofanta (Note: Sychofanta of the sharp knife and the Slippery Ways)	Chucklehead	Buffintruda (Note: Buffintruda, the Flower of Bashem)	Hiccup Horrendous Haddock The Second (Note: Hiccup Horrendous Haddock II, The Dragon Whisperer)	Furious
Algarick Ogglebert (Note: Algarick Ogglebert, Jurassic the Red, also known as Oiler)	Excellinor (Note: Excellinor the Witch)	Moody The Murderous	Squidface The Terrible	Brenda Bigarms; The Sixth	Honking Henrietta
Alvin The Treacherous	Termagent
Brenda Bigarms; The Seventh	Egginbreeza; Six-Pints	Gadiola of the Monobrow	Burly Sweet	Glugga
Old Wrinkly
Stoick The Vast	Valhallarama (Note: Valhallarama of the White Arms and Chunky Thighs)	Baggybum The Beerbelly	Fainting Freda
Fishlegs No-Name	Hiccup Horrendous Haddock The Third (Note: Hiccup Horrendous Haddock III, Hope and Heir to the Tribe of the Hairy Hooligans, The Useful, The Dragon Whisperer, The Dragonmark, Heir of Grimbeard the Ghastly and True King of the Wilderwest)	Snotface Snotlout	Adelaide

== Synopsis ==
=== How to Train Your Dragon (2003) ===
The first book in the series follows Hiccup as he captures a dragon as a rite of passage and attempts to train him so that he will not be exiled from Berk, as is tradition for young Viking boys on this island. Led by their teacher, Gobber the Belch, Hiccup manages to catch a small disobedient and toothless dragon, whom his cousin, Snotface Snotlout, names Toothless, and attempts to train it through his own methods. The Viking students are told to read a book called 'How to Train Your Dragon' by Professor Yobbish, but the book was found to have only one page (that says to yell at the dragon) and was therefore unhelpful. The Viking students must have their dragons trained before the Thor'sday Thursday Celebration in order to become proper Vikings. During this celebration, Toothless offends another dragon and a fight ensues between all the dragons. As this is seen as failure to train the dragons correctly, all the boys are sentenced to exile, but allowed to stay one night while a storm rages. During the storm, two Sea Dragons are washed up on the shore of the island and one eats the other, and seems a threat to the Vikings. Hiccup is chosen to negotiate with the dragon. However, the dragon, who calls himself the Green Death, says he is going to kill all the Vikings as soon as it fully recovers from its long slumber. While the village elders argue over how to attack the Green Death, Hiccup, the boys and their dragons start a fight between the Green Death and another sea dragon that washed up on the other side of the island, the Purple Death, resulting in the Green Death killing the Purple Death and, mortally wounded, swallowing Hiccup. Hiccup then escapes with the help of Toothless, who chose to act selflessly, killing the Green Death in the process. Hiccup and Toothless become heroes because of their bravery.

=== How to Be A Pirate (2004) ===
Hiccup finds the coffin of Grimbeard the Ghastly, the greatest pirate of all times and Hiccup's great-great-grandfather. The coffin contains a living man, named Alvin the Treacherous, who hides his true identity under the name Alvin the Poor-but-Honest-Farmer. Alvin tells the Hooligans that he was locked in the coffin and sent out to sea by "some very rude people". He claims that he found a riddle that tells how to find the treasure of Grimbeard the Ghastly and a map that depicts the island where the treasure is buried.

The Hooligans travel to the Isle of the Skullions, where they believe the treasure is hidden. Snotlout finds a small chest containing Grimbeard's famous sword, the Stormblade. Opening the chest triggers a trap which wakes up the Skullion dragons which inhabit the island. A brief fight with the Skullions ensues, a few of the Skullions are killed, and the Vikings escape with the treasure. Upon nearing Berk, the Hooligans begin fighting over the treasure, and as they fight, they are ambushed by a group of cannibalistic Vikings known as the Outcasts. Alvin reveals himself to be the vile Outcast's chief, and another battle starts. The ship soon catches fire and sinks. Everyone abandons it, climbing on the Outcasts' ship to continue the battle, but Hiccup, Toothless, Fishlegs, and Alvin are trapped underneath the capsized ship, kept alive with an air pocket.

As the air pocket is finally destroyed by the weight of the capsized ship, Toothless finds an underwater cavern filled with air. As the party begins to explore the cavern they come to a door and upon opening it, they find the real treasure of Grimbeard the Ghastly. Alvin turns on Hiccup to kill him using the Stormblade. In the sword-fight that follows, Alvin is eaten by a Monstrous Strangulator, an octopus-like creature which guards the treasure. As it comes next for Hiccup, Hiccup tricks the creature into injecting itself with its own poison. The creature's nervous system is destroyed and they escape, but Hiccup decides that the world is not ready for the treasure, and leaves it behind. Hiccup, Toothless and Fishlegs return to the village and much to their surprise are received as heroes due to their unexpected survival.

=== How to Speak Dragonese (2005) ===
Hiccup and Fishlegs get lost while out at sea. Fishlegs is caught by Romans, while Hiccup hides and tries to figure out a way to free him and escape. Hiccup causes a distraction and escapes with Fishlegs, but not before a Roman prefect grabs and tears away half of his How to Speak Dragonese notebook. In the morning, Hiccup realizes he took home a Nanodragon from the Roman Ship. The Nanodragon is, in fact, the king of the Nanodragons and self-proclaimed 'living god', Ziggerastica. For saving his life, Ziggerastica tells Hiccup he can call his name and he will come.

During another lesson, Hiccup and Fishlegs are again kidnapped and taken to Fort Sinister, a base of operations for the Roman Empire. Once there, Hiccup recognizes the Roman prefect as his old enemy Alvin the Treacherous. Fishlegs and Hiccup are imprisoned along with the young female Bog-Burglar heir, Camicazi. Toothless is eventually allowed to stay with Hiccup. After several failed attempts at escape, Hiccup calls for Ziggerastica and comes up with a plan of escape on Saturn's Day.

When the festival day arrives, the gang are put on a ship and sail into the gladiatorial arena, where they are to fight deadly Sharkworms, rather than a traditional fight on land. However, Hiccup, being carried by thousands of nanodragons, appears to fly into the air like a God and 'blow' the roof off the arena. The stunned Roman Consul gives him his Roman Shield, while Alvin the Treacherous gives Hiccup back his How to Speak Dragonese book. The arena erupts in chaos and the children escape in a Roman Observation Balloon. Alvin manages to get his hand-hook lodged into the balloon basket, but the children are able to twist him off, and he falls into Sharkworm-infested waters. They fly home in the balloon, then crash land onto the ships of Stoick and Big-Boobied Bertha. The two tribes make amends and return to their homes. Unbeknownst to Hiccup, Alvin had planted a Venomous Vorpent within the pages of his book, and it stings someone.

=== How to Cheat a Dragon's Curse (2006) ===
During a hunting expedition, Hiccup and Fishlegs spot a group of Hysterics, a tribe of scary lunatic Vikings. Hiccup and Fishlegs flee, with the Hysterics behind in hot pursuit. They are saved by One-Eye, a Saber-Toothed Driver dragon. Fishlegs has the symptoms of Vorpentitis, a disease caused by the sting of the Venomous Vorpent, and the only cure to this disease requires "the vegetable that no one dares name" (potato) from "the land that does not exist" (America). Old Wrinkly predicts the potato might be in the Hysteric Territories, and tells him that he must bring it back before ten o'clock the next morning, or else Fishlegs will die.

Hiccup brings Camicazi and Toothless on the journey to Hysteria, with One-Eye pulling them on a sleigh. The two children enter through the roof, but Hiccup falls into a pot of onion soup, and is discovered by Norbert the Nutjob. Hiccup makes Norbert show him the potato by pretending not to believe it exists. They force Hiccup to participate in trial by axe, where Norbert throws his axe in the air and the side that lands in the ground determines if Hiccup will be executed. Hiccup instead catches the axe gold side up, which he says means he should not be killed. Norbert locks Hiccup in a cage. After the Hysterics fall asleep, Camicazi picks the lock of Hiccup's cage and they leave the Hall through the chimney.

The three, along with One-eye, escape in Hiccup's boat, but get caught by Norbert and the Hysterics again. At that moment the Doomfang appears, eats the potato, and leaves. Hiccup realizes the Doomfang had Vorpentitis. For saving them from the Doomfang, Norbert lets them go. Once he gets back, he realizes that Fishlegs had only caught a cold, and Old Wrinkly had made a mistake. Old Wrinkly examines Hiccup and explains that it is actually Hiccup who has Vorpentitis. Fishlegs shoots Hiccup in his toe with an arrow soaked in the juices of the potato, and Hiccup recovers.

Hiccup buries the arrow and finds it had a seed on it that has sprouted into a potato plant. He plants more potatoes and no one dies of Vorpentitis ever again.

=== How to Twist a Dragon's Tale (2007) ===
While on a herding exercise, the children are distracted by a huge fire rolling down the mountainside. The fire is found to be the doing of evil fire dragons called Exterminators. While most of the kids escape on Gobber's riding dragon, Goliath, Hiccup and Gobber are saved by Humungously Hotshot, one of the greatest heroes on the planet. Hiccup's father, Stoick, hires him as Hiccup's bodyguard.

One night, Hiccup wakes up to Hotshot looming over him with his swords, arguing with himself whether or not to kill Hiccup. Hiccup asks him what he is doing. Hotshot begins to tell Hiccup his story of how he fell in love with a Viking woman, but her father wanted her to marry someone clever. The woman's father sent Hotshot to find and bring back the Firestone, and the reward was the woman's hand in marriage. Hotshot traveled to the volcano where the Firestone was hidden, but was captured by the Lava Louts. After a few weeks, he became friends with a jailkeeper named Terrific Al. Al told Humungous that he would bring the ruby heart to his ladylove if he killed Hiccup, stating that Hiccup is a Devil Child, who will send terror across the Archipelago.

Hiccup figures out that the woman is Hiccup's own mother and "Terrific Al" is really Alvin the Treacherous. Hiccup, his friends, and their dragons travel to Lava-Lout Island to put the fire stone inside the volcano to stop the volcano from exploding. They are attacked by Alvin riding an Exterminator. Hiccup puts the stone into the volcano and the stone hatches into a fire dragon. The dragon eats Alvin and the Exterminators and dives back into the lava. Hiccup and his riding dragon, Windwalker, run down the island away from lava and fall into the sea. Hiccup's father and others rescue him and everything works out well.

=== A Hero's Guide To Deadly Dragons (2007) ===
On his birthday, Hiccup goes to the Finals of a Burglary Competition between the Bog-Burglars and the Hooligans. When Hiccup comes home, he realizes Toothless has eaten three-quarters of Stoick's throne. Stoick comes in the room in a bad temper. He punishes Hiccup by confiscating his notebook on dragons, but then remembers that Gobber has stolen the "How to Train Your Dragon" manual from the Meathead Public Library. Stoick tells Hiccup that if Toothless does one more thing like this, he will banish him, and goes off to find the book. Toothless guiltily reveals that he also burned the copy of "How To Train Your Dragon". Camicazi suggests that the Meathead Public Library might have another copy of the book.

Hiccup, Camicazi and Fishlegs go to the Island of Forget Me to visit the Library. They fly on a Stealth Dragon which had been stolen from the Murderous Tribe. With the help of Stormfly, Camicazi's dragon, they find a second edition of "How to Train Your Dragon". The Hairy Scary Librarian catches them stealing the book and fights with Camicazi and Hiccup. The noise attracts Driller Dragons who are dwelling in the Library. Hiccup finds a book that was written by Hiccup Horrendous Haddock II called A Hero's Guide To Deadly Dragons which was exactly the same book that had been taken from him earlier that morning. He pulls the book out and the library shelf opens, revealing a hole filled with Poisonous Piffleworms. Their only exit would be to go through the hole.

Hiccup takes back the second edition of How to Train Your Dragon to the Isle of Berk. The Hairy Scary Librarian arrives and shoots Stoick with a Northbow, but Hiccup's notebook, in Stoick's breast pocket, saves Stoick's life. Hiccup, Fishlegs, and Camicazi come from the sky and squash the Librarian flat with the Stealth Dragon. Madguts the Murderous, Chief of the Murderous Tribe, arrives for the Stealth Dragon and are about to kill Big-Boobied Bertha, who stole the dragon. Hiccup saves her by telling Madguts that the Hairy Scary Librarian stole the Stealth Dragon instead. Madguts believes him and takes the Librarian away. Hiccup persuades Stoick that books are useful and books are unbanned by order of the Thing.

=== How to Ride a Dragon's Storm (2008) ===
Madguts the Murderous invites the Bog-burglars and the Hairy Hooligans to join the Murderous Tribe for an Intertribal Friendly Swimming race. The winner, to be defined as the last person back, may have a single request granted by the three Chiefs. Madguts, Stoick and Big Boobied Bertha set off to the water more slowly than the others, more certain that they will win the race. During the race, Hiccup, Camicazi and Fishlegs are kidnapped and taken to a ship, along with their hunting dragons. On the ship are Madguts, Norbert the Nutjob, and Gumboil. Madguts has agreed to have Norbert take Hiccup, Camicazi and Fishlegs to his boat in order to get them out of the race. Madguts puts Stoick and Bertha in jail and promises he will execute them as his reward for winning the race in three months.

Hiccup discovers there are slaves called the Northern Wanderers on the boat, who nearly kill him. They spare his life, on the condition that he helps them escape. The Wanderers tattoo Hiccup with the Slavemark, a Viking symbol which now means he is technically a slave. However, he can hide it under his helmet. Hiccup escapes with the Wanderers. After all Wanderers are safe on the emergency boats, Hiccup falls off the boat and lands on an iceberg, and is chased into a cave, where he wakes up on the back of a Leviathorgan. Hiccup gets back onto the boat as a storm breaks out, and the Leviathorgan attacks the ship. Norbert and Hiccup fight on the top of the ship. Lightning strikes Norbert's axe and it enters the sea, killing the Leviathorgan. Hiccup falls off the mast and is rescued by Fishlegs and Camicazi, who are themselves rescued by the Wanderers. The three fly to Berk on Norbert's flying machine, which the Wanderers had collected. The machine works well, but as they near Berk, the machine breaks and crashes into the ocean. Hiccup and his friends come just in time. Because Hiccup is the last person back, he demands Madguts sing a love song at the next "Thing" while dressed up as an "ickle pretty shepherdess".

Hiccup reflects that he will have the Slavemark for the rest of his life. Hiccup now realises that he wants to be a great King who abolishes slavery and who founds a New World in the Old World, not far across the ocean.

=== How to Break a Dragon's Heart (2009) ===
Camicazi went missing during a storm and the Hooligans are searching for her. They end up shipwrecked on a beach said to be haunted by a grieving woman and belonging to hostile Vikings called Uglithugs. While on the beach, they find a mysterious object, and they discover it is a throne belonging to the Hooligan tribe with a bloodstain on it. In the middle of the night, the leader of the Uglithugs, UG, and his men, discover the Hooligans, waking them up. UG tells them that a Hooligan has been sending love letters to his daughter, Tantrum O'Ugerly, and explains that if the person is of royal blood, the person can ask for Tantrum's hand in marriage after the person finishes an Impossible Task. If not, the person will be killed. Hiccup realizes that Fishlegs is the one who sent the letters, and spares Fishlegs's life by telling UG that he himself wrote the letters. UG then tells him the Impossible Task: by 5:00 the next day, he must give them a barrel of mead made from the honey made by the bees on the Island of Berserk.

On Berserk, Fishlegs successfully collects five pots of honey, but he and Hiccup are captured by Berserks. At the Berserk Village, Hiccup and Fishlegs meet the other fiancés of Tantrum, one of them being Humungously Hotshot the Hero. All of them are to be fed to "the Beast" later in the evening. Hiccup realizes that the chef of the Berserk Chief is actually his old nemesis Alvin the Treacherous. Hiccup tells Alvin that he can help him escape if he shows him where Camicazi is imprisoned. Alvin agrees; however, while they are in the woods, he pushes Hiccup into a tree cell, where Hiccup meets a witch. The witch gives Hiccup a challenge: she will tell him a story and at the end, they will both guess each other's names. Whoever guesses right will get to kill the other.

The witch tells him the story of Hiccup the Second, who was born a runt as well and was abandoned on a mountainside by his father, Grimbeard the Ghastly. Grimbeard's wife, Chinhilda, leaves him and sails to the Uglithugs island searching for her lost son, where she eventually became the legend of the crying woman. Hiccup the Second actually survives and is raised by Grimler dragons with his brother, an adopted Seadragon named Furious. Much later, Grimbeard finds Hiccup the Second who has grown to no longer be a runt, and takes him back home with Furious. However, when Hiccup II plans to hold a peaceful protest to protest the enslavement of dragons and humans, Grimbeard is tricked by his other son into thinking that it is violent rebellion and kills Hiccup II, getting his blood on the throne. Furious attempts to jump in front of Hiccup, but is too late. Grimbeard is remorseful immediately after and bids the next king be better than he was. The other two sons sire their own generations, with the one who betrayed Hiccup, Thugheart, banished and forming the Outcast tribe and the other, Chucklehead becoming chief of the Hooligans. The witch guesses Hiccup's name correctly and Hiccup guesses correctly that she is Alvin the Treacherous's mother, who is the heir to the Outcast tribe. Hiccup escapes, rescues Camicazi, and they return to the Berserk Village.

Hiccup goes back into his cage just as the feeding of "the Beast" begins. Hiccup realizes that "the Beast" is actually the ancient Furious, who Grimbeard imprisoned underground after killing Hiccup II. Hiccup promises to free Furious if he swears to help him escape and to not harm any humans, with Furious swearing on his heart to agree. Together, they free the thirteen fiancés. However, Furious sets fire to the Berserk woods and reveals he only swore on the half of his heart that loved Hiccup II, and tells Hiccup that a year after he leaves the Archipelago, he shall return to destroy the humans along with a dragon army. Hiccup, Camicazi, Fishlegs, Toothless, and their dragons return to Berk along with the honey. Humungous brings the five pots of honey to UG's room and goes on his honeymoon with Tantrum.

=== How to Steal a Dragon's Sword (2011) ===
Hiccup and other young warriors are brought to the island where "Flashburn's School of Swordfighting" waits for them. The children have three weeks at the school to train their sword fighting for New Year's Day. Once at the school, the only person there is the wicked witch Excellinor. She tells everyone that the dragons are revolting in a "Red Rage" and are led by the dragon Furious, who Hiccup released one year before. She tells the tribes that the sword fighting competition must be used to find the next king of the Wilderwest, who, according to prophecy has a dragon with no teeth, an arrow from a land that does not exist, Grimbeard's second-best sword, a ticking-thing, a rectangular shield, a throne, a crown, and the Dragon Jewel, which has the power to kill all dragons. Throughout his previous adventures, Hiccup has collected all of these things, except the crown and the Dragon Jewel.

Hiccup finds the crown under Flashburn's school, guarded by an ancient small brown dragon called Wodensfang. Hiccup wins the competition and is declared winner until Snotlout throws a stone at his head, knocking Hiccup's helmet off and revealing his Slavemark. Since Hiccup is a slave, he is disqualified from the competition and exiled from his tribe. Alvin is declared the new king and declares war on the dragons. Furious arrives and the war begins. Only Windwalker and Toothless stay faithful and bring Hiccup to safety. Hiccup discovers he has the map to find the Dragon Jewel and triumphantly cries: "This is not the end! I will be back!"

=== How to Seize a Dragon's Jewel (2012) ===
The book starts with Hiccup in exile on the run with Wodensfang, Windwalker and Toothless, deactivating dragon traps and freeing slaves. He is nearly killed by his mother, Vallhallarama, who does not recognize him with his different helmet and accidentally drops a tree trunk on her head. He travels to a slave jail called Prison Darkheart under Alvin the Treacherous's control to spy on Alvin, where he finds his father looking for the Dragon Jewel with the rest of the slaves under the witch and Alvin's orders. Hiccup meets a little girl named Eggingard who is the sister of the Wanderer boy Bearcub from How to Ride a Dragons Storm. She tells Hiccup how Fishlegs was dragged under the surrounding wet sand by the hand of a dragon with eyes on its fingers. He meets Camicazi who has been freeing prisoners with a team of other bog-burglars. They free Eggingard and Camicazi stows away in Hiccup's sand yacht. The witch captures Toothless and the Wodenfang and forces Hiccup to search for the dragon jewel. A three-headed Deadly Shadow sent by Furious swoops down and snatches Hiccup and Camicazi before he has a chance to look for it. The dragon brings him to a hill to kill him, but notices that he has the lobster claw necklace given to him by Fishlegs. The Deadly Shadow gets caught in a trap and tells him that they had promised to care for Fishlegs when he was a baby when they were owned by his mother Termagant.

Upon freeing the Deadly Shadow Hiccup is pulled in by the Monster of Amber Slavelands' hand. Hiccup defeats the monster by letting it swallow him and stabbing it in a weak spot above its head. He ventures off into the monster's maze of glass columns, where he finds Fishlegs and the Dragon Jewel. Then they swim to shore after finding an undersea tunnel, and Camicazi and the Deadly Shadow pick them up. Valhallarama finds Hiccup and takes him back to Darkheart, where she apologizes for not being around due to searching for the king's things and convinces the slaves to join Hiccup in helping to free the dragons and slaves by placing the Slavemark on her head and renaming it the Dragonmark. The rebellion Dragons break into the jail and the humans flee. Hiccup frees Toothless and Wodensfang, but loses the Dragon Jewel to Alvin. The story ends with Hiccup happily being reunited with Camicazi and Fishlegs.

=== How to Betray a Dragon's Hero (2013) ===
Ug the Uglithug tries to trick the Druid Guardian into crowning him king, but the Dragon Guardians of Tomorrow kill him by "Airy Oblivion". Hiccup and his friends hear a human calling for help, then abruptly stopping. They find Snotlout, with Wolf-fangs in the river and thousands of Dragon Rebellion dragons sleeping on the riverbank. Hiccup persuades the rest of the group to save him, accidentally waking up Snotlout's Hogfly and the nearby Rebellion dragons. They all flee to their secret hideout, hiding as Furious and the dragons search for them.

Alvin's Spydragons kidnap Camicazi, so Snotlout brings them on a rescue mission to save her. After following Snotlout up through a trapdoor, Hiccup discovers that he has betrayed him. After escaping from the witch and Alvin, Camicazi tricks the camp into thinking they are under attack by a large army. Snotlout, who the whole room of Alvinsmen and Dragonmarker prisoners of war had turned their backs on, repents and frees the prisoners. Hiccup and Snotlout manage to escape into the open ocean with the boat with the ten lost things, but are being chased by Alvin and the witch on dragonback. Snotlout puts on Hiccup's clothes and helmet and rides on Hiccup's dragon to face them, but is shot down and killed. Hiccup's lament forgives him for his bullying and praises his later work as a strong young Viking and then Hiccup's boat sinks and he is swept into a storm. The book ends with Hiccup lying unconscious on a beach and Wodensfang crying to himself that he is a traitor.

=== How to Fight a Dragon's Fury (2015) ===
Hiccup wakes up on the beach at Hero's End with amnesia, sustained when he hit his head at the end of the previous book. As Wodensfang tries to explain who Hiccup is, they are attacked by Sandsharks and a Vampire Spydragon who was tracking him by his two teeth that were in Hiccup's arm after it had bitten him the day before. After defeating the dragons, Hiccup takes a boat which has washed up on the beach and sails towards Tomorrow.

Once Hiccup reaches Tomorrow, he makes his way to Grimbeard the Ghastly's castle just as Alvin is about to be crowned king by the Druid Guardian. Hiccup regains his memory and convinces the Druid Guardian, with the help of Fishlegs, to crown him king instead. Hiccup is crowned and prepares to engage Furious in single combat. However, Wodensfang realizes that the Dragon Jewel is a fake. Regardless, Hiccup rides Windwalker into battle and Furious knocks him off Windwalker's back. Hiccup discovers the real Dragon Jewel inside Fishlegs's lobster claw necklace and threatens Furious with it. They reach a peace agreement and Hiccup throws the jewel into the sea.

Alvin and the Witch attack Furious, violating the laws of single combat. Furious orders the dragon army to attack and soon there is an all-out Vikings vs. Dragons battle. Alvin reveals that he is Fishlegs' father. The dragon guardians swoop down and kill Alvin once and for all. In battle, the Witch attacks Hiccup with a poisoned Stormblade. Furious takes the blow for Hiccup and kills the Witch. Furious leaves his command of the dragons to Luna, his second-in-command, and goes out to sea to die.

The epilogue shows how Hiccup built a new kingdom of harmony on Tomorrow where humans and dragons could live in peace. Hiccup instructs Fishlegs to tell everyone that the whole story was just a myth. The series ends the way it began: "There were dragons when I was a boy..."

== In other media ==
=== DreamWorks franchise ===
On 26 March 2010, DreamWorks Animation released a loose animated film adaptation, titled How to Train Your Dragon. Its voice cast includes Jay Baruchel as Hiccup, Gerard Butler as Stoick the Vast, Hiccup's father, and Craig Ferguson as Gobber the Belch, alongside original characters created for the film and reinvented versions of characters from the books. The film was a critical and commercial success, and subsequently spawned a media franchise for DreamWorks, including two feature film sequels—How to Train Your Dragon 2 (2014) and How to Train Your Dragon: The Hidden World (2019)—featuring original storylines, ignoring the events of the novel series. A live-action remake of the first film was released in 2025, starring Mason Thames as Hiccup and Butler reprising his role as Stoick.

=== Audio adaptations ===
All twelve novels have been recorded as audiobooks and released by Hachette Audio. They are narrated by David Tennant, who also voices Spitelout, Snotlout's father, in the film adaptations and in the series DreamWorks Dragons. Audiobooks of the novels have also been released in German, narrated by Benedikt Weber and released by Arena Verlag GmbH through Audible.com.

How to Be a Viking was recorded and released by Hachette Audio in 2014, narrated by Cressida Cowell.

== See also ==
- How to Train Your Dragon (franchise)
- How to Train Your Dragon (film)
