= The Nine Realms =

The Nine Realms may refer to:

- DreamWorks Dragons: The Nine Realms, an American animated television series in the How to Train Your Dragon franchise
- The Níu Heimar ("Nine Worlds") of Norse cosmology
