= List of DreamWorks Dragons: The Nine Realms episodes =

DreamWorks Dragons: The Nine Realms is an American animated television series in the How to Train Your Dragon franchise produced by the DreamWorks Animation under DreamWorks Animation Television for Peacock and Hulu.

The series was released on December 23, 2021, while season two was released on May 5, 2022. The third season was released on August 18, 2022, while the fourth season was released on November 17, 2022. The fifth season was released on March 2, 2023. The sixth season was released on June 15, 2023. The seventh season was released on September 14, 2023. The eighth and final season was released on December 14, 2023.

During the course of the series, 52 episodes of DreamWorks Dragons: The Nine Realms were released over eight seasons, concluding on December 14, 2023.

== Series overview ==
Season	Episodes	Originally released
1	6	December 23, 2021
2	7	May 5, 2022
3	7	August 18, 2022
4	6	November 17, 2022
5	6	March 2, 2023
6	7	June 15, 2023
7	7	September 14, 2023
8	6	December 14, 2023

== Episodes ==
=== Season 1 (2021) ===
No. overall	No. in season	Title	Directed by	Written by	Original release date
1	1	"First Flight"	Leo Riley	Story by : Henry Gilroy; Teleplay by : Henry Gilroy and John Tellegen; Storyboarded by : Sol Chen, Micah Gunnell, Paul Cohen, Ibraheem Jara, Josh Covey, Tim Maltby, George Gipson and Eric Pinedia	December 23, 2021
2	2	"First Flight"	Robert Briggs	Written by : John Tellegen; Storyboarded by : Josh Covey, Ji-Young Na and Chris Staggs	December 23, 2021
Part 1 : Tom Kullerson accompanies his mother Olivia to the Kullerson Fissure - a massive trench formed by a meteor strike. Arriving at the Project ICARIS research station, Tom makes friends with several kids at the site: Jun Wong, a childhood friend; D'Angelo Baker, an animal-lover; and Alexandra 'Alex' Gonzalez, a shy computer geek. When his curiosity of something strange he saw takes him into the fissure, Tom comes face to face with a real live dragon. Part 2 : Tom is initially startled by the dragon he found, a Night Light, but soon become curious about it after it shows curiosity in regards to humans. After returning back to ICARIS, he decides to keep his discovery a secret following a chat with Jun, but find a way into the cave that the Night Light resides in. Once there, he soon learns many things about dragons, and that the Night Light is not the only dragon, when an earthquake exposes a whole realm of them hidden in the fissure.
3	3	"A Hole New World"	Andrew Collins	Written by : Emma Dudley; Storyboarded by : Federico Ferrari, Derek Moore and Belynda Smith	December 23, 2021
Tom is forced to sneak around new sensors established by ICARIS so he can reunite with his new Night Light friend, whom he calls "Thunder". However, Jun follows him, and uncovers his secret, forcing him to convince her not to tell anyone else. She soon sticks to her word when a freak accident caused by some aggressive dragons, leads to her bonding with a two-headed dragon she calls "Wu and Wei" in order to escape being trapped in a cavern.
4	4	"Dragon Club"	Mandy Clotworthy	Written by : Mark Henry; Storyboarded by : Abby McKenzie, Adam Murphy and David Smith	December 23, 2021
Tom and Jun are suspicious about a man-made hole they find in the Crystal Realm, but their focus moves towards tending to an injured dragon, a Gembreaker. Seeking medical supplies, the pair are forced to bring along D'Angelo, who has been struggling to befriend others. Although frightened at first, he soon treats the Gembreaker's injuries, and proves his worth to the others when a group of dragons tries to bully it, only for the Gembreaker, whom he names "Plowhorn", to come to their rescue.
5	5	"Featherhide"	Andrew Collins	Written by : Mae Catt; Storyboarded by : Manny Banados, Federico Ferrari, Derek Moore and Belynda Smith	December 23, 2021
An invisible Featherhide follows after Tom and his friends after Thunder becomes distracted by the sight of lightning. At the same time, Alex becomes suspicious of what her friends are up to and decides to investigate, despite her fear of the outside world. When she uncovers their secret and panics, Tom finds himself trying to help her overcome her fears, especially to cope with the Featherhide subsequent appearance to the group.
6	6	"Fault Ripper"	Mandy Clotworthy	Written by : John Tellegen; Storyboarded by : Abby McKenzie, Adam Murphy and David Smith	December 23, 2021
Following more dangerous tremors, Olivia suggests the ICARIS team use a manned prove to blow up an area in the fissure that is the source of them. The staff agree, despite the arrival of Olivia's rival, Wilma Sledkin, who disapproves of the idea. Knowing the epicentre of the tremors happens to be close to the entrance to the dragon's hidden realms, Tom and his friends attempt to prevent this happening, especially when they learn a dragon called a Fault Ripper is the true source of the quakes.

=== Season 2 (2022) ===
No. overall	No. in season	Title	Directed by	Written by	Original release date
7	1	"Uniconned"	Robert Briggs	Written by : Emma Dudley; Storyboarded by : Josh Covey, Travis Marks, Jin-Young Na and Chris Staggs	May 5, 2022
Time has passed since the battle with the Fault Ripper but Tom is still plagued by dreams of the event, the dragon riders begin to explore other parts of the hidden world. While exploring the group discovers the same group of gembreakers trapping something in a small cave. After opening the crevice, they find a small cute dragon inside. Jun is smitten by it and asks the others to let her keep it but Tom, D'Angelo and Alex refuse since it is against the rules. Jun smuggles the dragon out of the fissure and into her house but is shocked to find her older brother Eugene waiting for her, she avoids him and runs into her room. Jun names the dragon "Nibbles", since it likes to nibble food and tries to go to sleep, but Nibbles tricks Jun into letting him out and makes a mess in the kitchen. Jun is almost caught by Eugene but while she's distracted, Nibbles escapes and screeches loudly. Jun chases after him but is confronted by Tom, D'Angelo, and Alex who force her to confess what she did. The kids track Nibbles to the storehouse and work together to capture him, as they make their way back to the fissure Nibbles's family arrives and frees him but before they go the Tiny dragons combine their power and create a giant bubble bomb and send it towards the town. Jun and Wu and Wei freeze the bubble while the others push it down the fissure, after its over Jun apologizes for her actions and realizes Eugene is at the storehouse. Dragons discovered : Bubblehorn
8	2	"Magma Breather"	Andrew Collins	Written by : Mark Henry; Storyboarded by : Manny Banados, Derek Moore and Belynda Smith	May 5, 2022
Tom has learned that his mother, Olivia is going to investigate a cave in the fissure that might have deposits of gold. However, Dr. Sledkin has her reassigned to a different cave, which concerns Tom and the Dragon Riders as it just so happens to be the cave that leads to the Crystal Realm and the dragons that live there. Coming up with a plan to keep the secret of dragon safe, Tom convinces his mom to take him on the expedition into the caves while the other riders work on a way to seal the cave entrance to force the explorers away. D’Angelo, looking to prove his leadership skills to the others, takes command of the team and basically yells his orders just like his father would, which gets on everybody's nerves. While making their way through the cave system, Tom and his mom reminisce on old times while discovering a bright green Crystal that Tom has seen in the dragon world, but decide to keep it from Sledkin when she shows up to join them. While D’Angelo is trying and failing to seal the cave entrance, Plowhorn leads the others to a new dragon that she believes could help them, a lava-belching boar-like dragon that they dub a Magma Breather. After learning that the dragon is quite hateful to D’Angelo, Jun and Alex decide to use that to get the dragon to use its lava to seal the cave. When Tom, Olivia and Sledkin get close to the cave entrance, lava starts flowing towards them quite rapidly, and as such, forces them to retreat back to the original cave opening in the Fissure, keeping the secret safe. D’Angelo since learns to trust his team and Tom is left pondering over the strange crystals in the realm. Dragons discovered : Magma Breather
9	3	"Dragons of the Undead"	Mandy Clotworthy	Written by : Mae Catt; Storyboarded by : Abby McKenzie, Adam Murphy and David Smith	May 5, 2022
The day begins with our heroes in a classroom learning about the importance of public speaking, a subject that terrifies Alex. The riders practice their speeches in the lair just as they get an alert from the sensors they placed in the Crystal Realm. Rushing in to investigate, they suddenly get attacked by a large horde of white Featherhide dragons that capture Feathers and take her away. While the riders regroup, Jun presumes that the dragon that attacked them could be zombies and D’Angelo; who got bitten by one, becomes convinced that he's turning into one of them. Alex and the riders track the Featherhides to a cavern with a crystal tower where Feathers is being held prisoner and try to rescue her, only to be chased off by a white Titan-wing Featherhide. Alex, refusing to leave her friend behind, summons all the strength and courage she has and goes back in alone to get Feathers back, while instructing the other riders to keep the horde busy, even though by this time D’Angelo has had Tom tie him to Plowhorn to keep his friends safe from him. Through some creative thinking and a hologram that she has made of herself for her speech, Alex manages to sneak past the horde, climb the tower and free Feathers. Tom, Jun and their dragons do their best to hold back the horde and are almost overrun. Luckily, Alex and Feathers come to the rescue by blasting the other Featherhides, realizing that the dragons are actually molting their scales, which makes them far more aggressive than usual. After blasting all of the Featherhides, including the Titan-wing, the riders are saved and the dragons return to their home. Feathers choose to stay with Alex and the other riders take comfort in the fact that Alex can be brave, but only when it really counts.
10	4	"Downpour"	Robert Briggs	Written by : John Tellegen and Emma Dudley; Storyboarded by : Josh Covey, Mitchell Lin, Travis Marks, Jin-Young Na and Chris Staggs	May 5, 2022
While searching for clues about the connection between Thunder and the symbol of on his viking helmet, Tom discovers an area filled with water home to large water dragons called Floodfangs. When Leonard Burne, AKA Buzzsaw, the unstable head of a logging company unknowingly starts a forest fire, members of the ICARUS team go out to rescue those still trapped in the fire. The dragon riders secretly follow the rescue team and discretely help evacuate the trapped loggers. The fire grows even more dangerous when Buzzsaw, in a foolish attempt to save his family's company, accidentally crashes his gasoline filled car into the fire. With the intensifying fire nearing ICARUS, Tom heads back to the lake in the dragon realm to train the Floodfangs to put out the fire, but has to be rescued by Alex. After lecturing Tom on his poor teamwork, Alex helps lure the Floodfangs to the fire using fireflies that resemble the glowing plankton they eat. The Floodfangs managed to put out the fire and Tom promises to be more open with his team. After the fire is extinguished, Buzzsaw discovers his family's logging company was destroyed by the fire and when he sees Thunder flying overheard, believes him to be a "lightning bird" that started the fire, unaware it was actually his own fault, and vows revenge. Tom reveals his mysterious link between Thunder and his ancestors to Jun, but keeps it a secret from D'Angelo and Alex. Dragons discovered : Floodfang
11	5	"The Tangled Web"	Andrew Collins	Written by : Emma Dudley; Storyboarded by : Manny Banados, Derek Moore and Rhianna Wynter	May 5, 2022
While exploring the dragon realm, the group comes across an area filled with strange webbing but leave at a frightened Jun's insistence. Tom's friendship with D'Angelo becomes strange when the former's recklessness gets the latter in trouble with his father, who believes Tom to be a bad influence. Later, the group discovers a lost spider-like dragon called a Spiderwing that ends up clinging to Jun's head. When they return the Spiderwing back to the webbed area, Jun and Alex are captured by its pack and Tom and D'Angelo's arguing complicates their attempts to rescue them. Their arguing reaches its peak when D'Angelo tells Tom he doesn't understand what a dad is like because his father ran out on him and his mom, but the two realize their arguing has gone too far and apologize. D'Angelo explains he appreciates his father's strictness, but being a dragon rider is in direct contrast to how he's been raised and tells Tom he needs to trust his judgement at ICARUS like he trusts Tom in the dragon realm, and the two reconcile. After figuring out that all their dragon's firepower combined can destroy the Spiderwings' webbing, the pair free Jun and Alex and escape the Spiderwings' lair. D'Angelo speaks with his father, defending Tom, earning Philip's respect. Dragons discovered : Spiderwing
12	6	"Follow the Lightning"	Robert Briggs	Written by : Mark Henry and Mae Catt; Storyboarded by : Josh Covey, Abby McKenzie, Adam Murphy and David Smith	May 5, 2022
13	7	"Follow the Lightning"	Mandy Clotworthy	N/A	May 5, 2022
Part 1 : Shortly after the incident with the Spiderwings, Tom and the other riders plan to spend the day exploring the hidden world but when they arrive at the lair, Thunder is gone, leaving Tom devastated but determined to find his dragon. Meanwhile, Eugene starts to suspect Jun is hiding something and tries to find answers. Tom, Jun, D'Angelo and Alex start to follow Thunder's trail and the path leads them to what appears to be a dead end but Wu and Wei blast a hole in the wall and the group discover a new dragon world. Tom sees a lightning strike in the distance and decide to follow it but soon after setting out the kids fly through a stampede of Terrible Terrors and are then ambushed by a cluster of Spiderwings. After narrowly escaping, they continue on they come across a water hole and rest and refuel as they do Nibbles and his pack attack them but Wu and Wei freeze them in ice. Jun begins to feel unsafe and suggests they turn back and D'Angelo and Alex agree with her but Tom is still intent on finding Thunder and reveals his secret to D'Angelo and Alex but fails to convince them to continue on and sets off on foot shortly after they catch up to Tom and make up, the dragon riders start moving and come across a tornado blocking their path the tornado is revealed to be caused by a steel-scaled dragon. The dragon attacks them and Jun suspects it is protecting something, the riders defeat the dragon and find Thunder, Tom learns that Thunder was trying to find his family from whom he was separated. The kids find a scale from an unknown dragon on the ground and look on at a large hole in the wall. Part 2 : The dragon riders learn the truth about why Thunder wandered off and follow the footprints belonging to the unknown dragon into the cave. Meanwhile, back at ICARIS, Eugene continues his investigation about Jun and attempts to break into her laptop. He even reads through her Journal but becomes disinterested. Tom, Jun, D'Angelo, and Alex emerge from the cave and into a crystal maze where they wander around trying to find a way out, but instead come face to face with a sleeping Titan-wing dragon with a wyvern-like appearance, the dragon responsible for separating Thunder from his family. The dragon, known as a Skrill, is asleep and the dragon riders and their dragons attempt to quietly walk away careful not to wake it but Thunder, full of hate, growls at it despite Tom's pleas to leave it be. The Skrill wakes up and uses its lightning breath to bring the cavern down splitting the kids up. They manage to regroup and realize that getting past the is the only way that they will escape the maze. Tom also realizes that large veins of silver in the walls are absorbing the lightning from the Skrill, so he uses a piece of a silver fashioned to look like a sword as a lightning rod to drain the Skrill's power and supercharge Thunder. After a Mega-Lightning Blast defeats the Skrill and opens a new route back home, Tom swears to the riders to always be there for them and the riders swear to help Thunder find his family. The kids watch as the Skrill disappears into another dragon realm filled with magma and fire. As they look inside Tom finds a spear head with the same symbol on it and realizes other people have been there before. Dragons discovered : Razorwhip and Skrill Realm discovered : Fire Realm

=== Season 3 (2022) ===
No. overall	No. in season	Title	Directed by	Written by	Original release date
14	1	"Fire Escape"	Andrew Collins	Written by : Mae Catt; Storyboarded by : Manny Banados, Derek Moore and Rhianna Wynter	August 18, 2022
The group tries to develop a fire-proof suit capable of withstanding the heat of the Fire Realm, and Tom comes up with a plan to use a dragon from the Fire Realm to perfect the suits. Eugene keeps trying to find out what dragon club is, but encounters Buzzsaw, who is roaming the woods looking for the "lightning bird." Tom lures out a Monstrous Nightmare from the Fire Realm, but his attempts to train it to test the suit only anger it. Jun points out that Tom isn't giving the dragon the respect of a living being and he apologizes for trying to use it, appeasing the dragon. The Monstrous Nightmare grows interested in Tom's bond with Thunder and Tom manages to befriend it, but the playful dragon flies out into the fissure. While talking with Buzzsaw, Eugene realizes that his description of the "lightning bird" matches the drawing of Thunder he saw in Jun's journal. While the group tries to bring the Monstrous Nightmare back to the dragon realm, Eugene witnesses the dragon, but gets separated from Buzzsaw. Tom manages to get on top of the Monstrous Nightmare and ride it back to its home. Afterwards, the group discovers the Monstrous Nightmare's gel can be used to perfect the fire suits. Dragons discovered : Monstrous Nightmare
15	2	"Ride or Die"	Mandy Clotworthy	Written by : Emma Dudley; Storyboarded by : Abby McKenzie, Adam Murphy, David Smith and Quynh Truong	August 18, 2022
Jun gets in an argument with her mother, who believes she won't be able to survive in the world if she keeps believing in fantasy. The group manages to perfect two fire suits to explore the fire realm and the group invites Jun to explore the fire realm with tom to cheer her up. Wilma coerces Olivia to share the unknown crystal she previously found, which is harder than diamond, and plans to explore the area it was found. While exploring the fire realm Jun vents to Tom her frustrations about her mom trying to choose her path in life and not trying to understand her. The pair find a shield in the fire realm, more proof humans have been there before. D'Angelo and Alex discover Wilma is trying to mine more crystals like the one Olivia found and try to scare them off, but Wilma is undeterred. Tom and Jun find a Terrible Terror being attacked by a new pack of aggressive dragons and work to save it, but become trapped. D'Angelo and Alex finally manage to scare off Wilma's miners using Feather's cloaking. Using the shield and tactics from the myth of Medusa, Jun is able to hold off the new dragons until they are called away by an unknown dragon. Tom assures Jun that her mom is wrong and she can survive on her own just fine. Dragons discovered : Flame Throwers
16	3	"Empty Fireworm Nest"	Andrew Collins	Written by : Ricky Roxburgh; Storyboarded by : Manny Banados, Derek Moore and Rhianna Wynter	August 18, 2022
Alex's moms beginning missing having Alex around since she's been hanging around with her new friends. The group uses their completed set of fire suits to explore the Fire Realm together and discover a flock of small glowing dragons, one of which secretly stows away in Alex's bag. Buzzsaw decides to begin investigating ICARUS. Eugene confronts Jun about his sighting of a Monstrous Nightmare, but she narrowly manages to keep the secret. After Alex's moms discover the stowaway, which they name "Glowmer"; the group plans to free it before the rest of ICARUS finds out or the rest of the flock expose themselves looking for their missing member. However, Alex's moms become enamored with Glowmer, which begins to weaken without the heat from the rest of its flock. Jun and Alex managed to grab the dragon, but Eugene steals it and tries to expose. Jun manages to trick Eugene into giving up the dragon by claiming that it gives bad luck. Alex's moms catch the two trying to release the dragon and one of Wilma's workers takes the dragon to show Wilma. Alex explains to her parents she was trying to set the dragon free because it is suffering in captivity and her parents forgive her. To get the dragon back before Wilma can see it, Alex launches one of ICARUS's defense drills and manage to free it with some help from Feathers and Alex's parents. They return just in time to return the dragon to its flock and Alex spends some time with her parents. Dragons discovered : Fireworm
17	4	"Dr. Catastrophe"	Robert Briggs	Written by : Mark Henry; Storyboarded by : Josh Covey, Mitchell Lin, Kathy J. Liu, Travis Marks and Chris Staggs	August 18, 2022
After helping calm down a rampaging sheep D’Angelo grows quite overconfident in his knowledge of animal treatment. The group finds a pack of bulky dragons from the Fire Realm that wandered into the crystal realm and are eating crystals that are making them sick. D'Angelo comes up with a plan to use rocks the dragons normally eat to lure them back to the fire realm, but ignores Plowhorn's objections to the rocks he picks to use as bait. When the group tries to use the rocks, the dragons go wild over eating them and Plowhorn shows the group the "rocks" turn out to be the eggs of a massive mother dragon. Horrified over his mistake, D'Angelo gives up and the rest of the group tries to return the egg and Gronckles to their homes. They manage to lure the pack back to the fire realm using the only remaining stolen egg and return the egg to its mother, but the dragon believes the bulky ones deliberately stole her remaining eggs. Alex finds D'Angelo and brings him back to help. D'Angelo redeems himself by using his animal knowledge to cause the dragons to vomit out the eaten eggs intact. Dragons discovered : Gronckle and Catastrophic Quaken
18	5	"It Flies in the Family"	Mandy Clotworthy	Written by : Mae Catt; Storyboarded by : Abby McKenzie, Adam Murphy, David Smith and Simon Williams	August 18, 2022
Eugene finds the group's lair and threatens to reveal the secret unless the group helps him train his own dragon. The attempts to find a dragon for Eugene all fail, but before Eugene can leave, the same pack of Flame Throwers appear in the Crystal Realm. While fending off the Flame Throwers, the group discovers the Flame Throwers have carved a path from the Fire Realm to invade the Crystal Realm and that they are hunting a new dragon called a Deadly Spinner. While running from the Flame Throwers, Eugene saves the Deadly Spinner from them and bonds with it. The dragon riders manage to repel the Flame Throwers and seal their entrance with the help of the Deadly Spinner, who Eugene names "Webmaster". Eugene officially becomes the newest member of the Dragon Club. Dragons discovered : Deadly Spinner and Hobgobbler
19	6	"Magma Comes to the Surface"	Robert Briggs	Written by : Laura Bowes; Storyboarded by : Josh Covey, Max Lawson, Mitchell Lin, Travis Marks, Ji-Young Na and Chris Staggs	August 18, 2022
Tom plans to turn the chunk of crystal he used against the titan Skrill into a sword, but when the group finds a Magma Breather to get the lava to forge it, they discover it is sick. After determining something is clogging the Magma Breather's liquid lava, the group decides to bring it to the ICARUS infirmary to use the ultrasound machine to find the source of the block. They use the dragon's dislike of D'Angelo to bring it to the fissure and sneak him into the infirmary while Eugene, who seeks to prove himself to the group, keeps an eye on the other dragons. Eugene ends up keeping Buzzsaw from finding the dragons, by distracting him. The group discovers an eaten crystal is blocking the Magma Breather's ability to produce magma, but the prolonged lack of exposure to heat causes the heat dependent dragon to begin freezing to death. Eugene almost manages to get Buzzsaw to believe the "lightning bird" he's hunting for isn't real, but Thunder is discovered and Eugene is forced to knock him out and keeps the incident a secret. The group brings the Magma Breather back to the Fire Realm, with Eugene and Webmaster helping to create a web net to carry it. The Magma Breather is saved and Eugene is made a full member of the dragon riders. Using the Magma Breather's lava, Tom forges his new Lightning sword.
20	7	"The Sky Torcher"	Andrew Collins	Written by : Ricky Roxburgh; Storyboarded by : Manny Banados, Arron Davies, Ian Milne and Derek Moore	August 18, 2022
Tom still has guilty nightmares about the battle with the Fault Ripper and decides to find it to make sure it is okay. Olivia and Wilma investigate a sinkhole away from the fissure, but are observed by Buzzsaw, who owns the land the sinkhole is on. Before Tom can search for the Fault Ripper, a large pack of Flamethrowers invade and they are led by a massive long-necked white dragon known as the Sky Torcher. The giant alpha proves to powerful to stop on their own so Tom decides to find the Fault Ripper to help them. Jun and Tom fly down to the bottom of the fissure and discover the Fault Ripper is alive, but it is still angry at them. Buzzsaw's unstable behavior and attempts to interrogate the location of the "lightning bird" drives Olivia and Wilma to end their investigation early, but he ends up falling down the sinkhole. The Fault Ripper continues to be aggressive towards Tom and Jun, but the former discovers it is actually afraid of them because of the last time they fought. Tom apologizes to the dragon for what happened and manages to tame it. With the help of the Fault Ripper, the group fights the invaders, but they get cornered by the alpha. The dragons of the Crystal Realm band together to fight the white alpha and send it retreating back into the Fire Realm along with the Flame Throwers. The battle ends up revealing a secret chamber containing a hidden canister with Tom's ancestral symbol. At the bottom of the sinkhole, Buzzsaw discovers another dragon realm covered in snow and ice. Dragons discovered : Sky Torcher

=== Season 4 (2022) ===
No. overall	No. in season	Title	Directed by	Written by	Original release date
21	1	"Cold Open"	Mandy Clotworthy	Written by : John Tellegen; Storyboarded by : Abby McKenzie, David Smith and Simon Williams	November 17, 2022
Tom obsessively searches for a way to open the canister and Jun and Alex drag him to investigate a sinkhole to get his mind off it. and discover that the sinkhole leads to a dragon realm of ice. When Thunder gets separated from the group, gets caught in a trap set by Buzzsaw, who tries to kill him. Thunder escapes, and Buzzsaw learns about the dragon riders. He pretends to be an injured hiker who accidentally fell into the ice realm to get close enough to kill Thunder. When Jun goes to get Eugene and D'Angelo to help bring Buzzsaw back to the surface, Eugene explains his previous encounters with Buzzsaw. Tom and Alex eventually figure out Buzzsaw's deception, but he escapes into the frozen woods. Meanwhile, Olivia experiments on the crystal she found and triggers an unknown reaction. Realm discovered : Ice Realm
22	2	"Uncharted Territory"	Robert Briggs	Written by : Mark Henry; Storyboarded by : Max Lawson, Mitchell Lin, Ji-Young Na and Chris Staggs	November 17, 2022
While searching for the key to the canister in the Ice Realm, Webmaster and Feathers get separated from the group when an underground storm hits and the group is forced to leave them behind to avoid getting caught in it as well, against Eugene and Alex's objectioжs. During the night, Eugene and Alex decide to go back on their own and find their dragons and the rest of the group ends up join them after realizing it was unfair to force the decision to leave. They find Feathers and Webs being held captive by a snow-white dragon with large spiky horns and rescue them. Afterward, Tom discovers the key to the canister is a horn from his ancestral viking helmet and unlocks the canister's contents: the Book of Dragons. Dragons discovered : Yetiwing
23	3	"Journey to the Snowcano"	Andrew Collins	Written by : Mae Catt; Storyboarded by : Manny Banados, Ian Milne and Derek Moore	November 17, 2022
While chasing Flame Throwers, Wu and Wei exhaust their ability to produce steam and become sick. Wu and Wei fly off toward a giant snow-covered volcano which Jun believes connects to a myth from her childhood, which may help cure Wu and Wei but Tom finds a page about it in the book of dragons that seems to warn of danger. Jun encourages everyone to follow Wu and Wei up the mountain despite Tom's hesitance, facing sheer winds and hallucinatory gas. At the top of the volcano, the group encounters a titan wing Mist Twister which tries to drop Wu and Wei into the volcano. Tom believes the dragon is hostile, but Jun discovers the titan-wing doesn't mean harm and it brings Wu and Wei into a volcanic spring inside the volcano that heals them. Inspired by the discovery, Tom decides to beginning adding his own entries into the Book of Dragons.
24	4	"The Decoy"	Mandy Clotworthy	Written by : F.M. De Marco; Storyboarded by : Rachel Mackey, Abby McKenzie, David Smith and Simon Williams	November 17, 2022
Tom discovers that another piece of crystal, which Olivia agrees to name Dragoncite, has been found and worries it may lead to the dragon realm being discovered. The group begins searching for Buzzsaw and discovers he's capturing dragons using a purple massive-winged dragon he can control with a hand-carved whistle. Tom comes up with a plan to sneak into Buzzsaw's camp and steal the dragon whistle, but he falls into a trap and is captured. Tom manages to trick Buzzsaw into letting him "train" his dragon to create an opportunity to steal the whistle, buying enough time for the other dragon riders to rescue Thunder and the captured dragons. Tom manages to steal the whistle and Buzzsaw gets carried away when the released dragon flies off and he gets caught on a rope tied to it. Back at Icarus, Olivia begins to suspect Tom has been keeping secrets. Dragons discovered : Timberjack and Snowtail
25	5	"The Night Lights"	Robert Briggs	Written by : Ricky Roxburgh; Storyboarded by : Fernando Corrales, Jeffrey Chang, Max Lawson and Chris Staggs	November 17, 2022
26	6	"The Night Lights"	Andrew Collins	Written by : John Tellegen; Storyboarded by : Manny Banados, Ian Milne and Derek Moore	November 17, 2022
Part 1 : While searching for Buzzsaw, Tom and Thunder find a baby Night Light that he later names Shadow, who is Thunder's little brother, caught in a trap. When the group gets food for the dragon, Olivia becomes more suspicious and begins searching the footage from Tom's drone. The group follows Shadow to find his and Thunder's home and family and he leads them into a cave set up with traps meant to keep humans out. The group reaches a new realm where Thunder reunites with his whole family. Though Thunder's parents are wary of the group, they quickly warm up to them, but the large elder of Thunder's pack distrusts them when he sees Tom's lightning sword. Having finally reunited Thunder with his family, Tom tearfully leaves Thunder behind with his family. While studying the drone footage, Olivia discovers the location of the dragon lair. Before the group can leave the King's Realm, Shadow brings them back and they discover the cave has been attacked and Thunder's family is nowhere to be found. Realm discovered : King's Realm Part 2 : The dragon riders find Thunder and his family hiding in where they discover a workshop and an illustration of Hiccup and his family, who Tom realizes are his ancestors. Olivia begins investigating Tom's secret but keeps it a secret from Wilma, who tries but fails to follow her. The group is ambushed by a white tusked dragon, which was responsible for the assault on Thunder's home and pack, and are separated from their dragons. Tom believes the dragon followed them into the realm and blames himself for bringing it to the King's Realm, but the group urges him to fix his mistake rather than blame himself. Tom modifies the traps from earlier to stun the dragon with a paralyzing dart, but another one arrives to aid the first one and they injure Thunder and set their sights on Thunder's family members next. With Thunder too injured to fight, Tom rides the elder Night Light to battle the offending pair until Thunder rejoins the fight and Tom uses his lightning sword to focus Thunder and the elder's lightning into a powerful blast that drives off the pair. Afterward, realizing that Thunder and Tom belong together, the elder Night Light accepts Tom as a friend and lets Thunder stay with the Dragon Club. Thrilled to have his friend back, Tom and the group return to the dragon lair, only for Tom and Thunder to be found by Olivia. Dragons discovered : Snow Wraith

=== Season 5 (2023) ===
No. overall	No. in season	Title	Directed by	Written by	Original release date
27	1	"Punishment and Torcher"	Leo Riley	Written by : Ricky Roxburgh; Storyboarded by : Rachel Mackey, Derek Moore, David Smith and Simon Williams	March 2, 2023
Taking place right after the previous episode, Olivia discovers Thunder and is outraged with Tom about his lies. Though the other dragon riders avoid getting discovered and Olivia agrees to keep Thunder a secret for the time, Olivia grounds Tom and forbids him from leaving his house. When the other dragon riders investigate an alert from the Ice Realm, they discover Buzzsaw has built a makeshift base and has been capturing dragons again using his Timberjack and all of them except for Thunder are captured. Thunder sneaks into ICARIS to get Tom's help, but Olivia refuses to let Tom leave. Tom manages to convince Olivia to let him help the other dragon riders by admitting the whole secret about the hidden world and the other dragon riders. Tom and Thunder try to confront Buzzsaw, but the confrontation is interrupted by the arrival of the Sky Torcher. Using newly deciphered knowledge from the Book of Dragons, the dragon riders manage to subdue it and discover the Sky Torcher only came to free its pack of Flamethrowers that Buzzsaw had captured. When the Flamethrowers are freed, the Sky Torcher leaves peacefully down a tunnel to a new realm filled with jungle plants. Tom returns home and reconciles with Olivia, but is nervous about revealing the hidden world to her. Meanwhile, Buzzsaw recruits his former logger employees to help him with his operations. Realm discovered : Nature Realm
28	2	"Welcome to the Wonderful World of Dragons"	Mandy Clotworthy	Written by : Mark Henry; Storyboarded by : Rachel Mackey, Derek Moore, David Smith and Simon Williams	March 2, 2023
When Olivia tells Tom she plans to explore the hidden world to determine whether it is safe for the kids to be down there, Tom comes up with a plan to stage a fake tour of the crystal realm to convince her it is not dangerous. The dragon club gathers docile dragons to place along the determined route and the plan works at first. However, a Scuttleclaw dragon Eugene added to the tour causes havoc when its high-pitched roar makes the other dragons agitated. Tom is forced to admit he staged the tour, but Olivia is impressed when the dragon club catches the Scuttleclaw and calms down the dragons. Olivia decides not to forbid the kids from the hidden world, but reveals she is planning on telling all the kid's parents about it. Dragons discovered : Scuttleclaw
29	3	"Barrel of Vine Tails"	Robert Briggs	Written by : Bethany Armstrong Johnson; Storyboarded by : Fernando Corrales, Max Lawson and Chris Staggs	March 2, 2023
Tom discovers the clue to the identity of his ancestor and the key to his connection with the dragons when he finds a passage in the Book of Dragon that mentions his ancestor's final resting place is in the Nature Realm. While searching for the gravestone, the Book of Dragons is stolen by a pack of new dragons called Vinetails. While reclaiming the book, the dragon club is lured by the Vinetails into a trap of dragon-eating carnivorous plants to distract them so the Vinetails can acquire food from a fruit tree the plants surround. When the plants are too strong to break free of, Tom convinces the Vinetails to help free the dragons and repay them by creating a permanent safe path to the fruit tree. The dragon club finds the resting place mentioned in the book, but discover it was actually referring to a place to relax and the only clue they find to the identity of Tom's ancestor is the word "Haddock" carved in. Tom later shares what he learned with Olivia who reveals her ancestor's family name was Haddock, leading Tom to piece together his ancestor's identity: Hiccup Haddock III. Dragons discovered : Vinetails
30	4	"Scent of a Dragon"	Andrew Collins	Written by : Stephanie Streisand; Storyboarded by : Manny Banados, Ian Milne and Derek Moore	March 2, 2023
Jun and Eugene get into a fight when Jun complains about how Eugene lets their mother baby him while she is treated strictly. While the dragon club explores the Jungle/Nature Realm in search of a new dragon called a Sniffflehide, they find Buzzsaw and his henchmen trying to capture it. The Snifflehide ends up kidnapping Eugene and escaping to her nest, where the dragon club discovers the dragon thinks Eugene is one of her babies, because the dragon relies on smell instead of sight and Eugene's cologne makes him smell like her eggs. The club manages to wash the cologne off Eugene, but when Buzzsaw tries to steal the Snifflehide's eggs, they chase him off by dunking him in Eugene's cologne and letting the Snifflehide chase him away. Afterward, Eugene tells Jun that their mother treats them differently because she actually thinks Jun is more capable than him, and he decides to become more self-sufficient. Meanwhile, Olivia struggles with the pressure of keeping the dragon secret as it becomes increasingly hard to keep it. Dragons discovered : Snifflehide
31	5	"Sting It On!"	Robert Briggs	Written by : F.M. De Marco; Storyboarded by : Fernando Corrales, Max Lawson and Chris Staggs	March 2, 2023
Tom and Olivia argue about keeping the dragon secret, with Olivia pointing out Tom doesn't understand the duties of being a parent. Things get worse when Sledkin announces she is planning to investigate the sinkhole leading to the Ice Realm in search of more dragonsite. Tom comes up with a plan to get some draonsite first and use it to deter Sledkin from discovering the Ice Realm, but Olivia goes into the Ice Realm alone without telling anyone. Jun and D'Angelo stall Sledkin's expedition while Tom, Alex, Eugene, and the dragons search for Olivia. When Tom's group finds Olivia, they discover she's been paralyzed by a pack of Speed Stingers, which ambush the group and paralyze many of them. While trying to think of a way to escape the Speed Stingers, Tom comes to understand the worries his mom has about him. The group defeats the Speed Stingers by using Feather's cloaking ability to trick them into stinging each other until one is left. The last Speed Stinger flees into the entrance tunnel just as Sledkin enters and it paralyzes her. Sledkin is sent to the infirmary under the guise of being bitten by a cave snake, but Olivia tells Tom she's unable to keep the secret and plans to tell the other parents. Dragons discovered : Speed Stingers
32	6	"Deep Freeze"	Andrew Collins	Written by : Ricky Roxburgh; Storyboarded by : Manny Banados, Ian Milne and Derek Moore	March 2, 2023
While ICARIS is beset by a blizzard, Sledkin recovers from her paralysis and rants about being attacked by a "large creature." Olivia decides to reveal the dragon secret before Sledkin can, but is prevented from doing so when the blizzard worsens and causes the power to fail, threatening everyone at ICARIS. Philip assigns Linda to retrieve emergency winter gear from a supply outpost while he and Olivia try to restart the power. However, Linda slips her van on a patch of frozen road and crashes on the way back from getting supplies and Philip and Olivia fail to restart the frozen generator. The dragon club decide to enlist their dragon's aid to secretly help ICARIS survive the blizzard. D'Angelo and Eugene are sent to rescue Linda while Tom, Jun, and Alex try to restart the power. Tom's group manages to almost restore power, but Sledkin finds them and shoots Thunder with a tranquilzer dart, causing him to accidentally fry it. Alex knocks out Sledkin, but Olivia discovers their actions and decides keeping the secret is doing more harm and plans to reveal it after the blizzard. When things get desperate, Philip and Olivia try to take a helicopter to get supplies, but the cold causes the helicopter to malfunction and lose control. Before it can crash into the fissure, the dragon riders save them and reveal the dragons to the ICARIS crew, who D'Angelo reminds are forbidden under secrecy guidelines that forbid them from telling others about anything discovered at ICARIS. Tom introduces the dragons and explains they can be friends if they are shown respect and protected, but Eugene causes an accident with Webmaster trying to show off, leaving the introduction of dragons to an uncertain start.

=== Season 6 (2023) ===
No. overall	No. in season	Title	Directed by	Written by	Original release date
33	1	"Dragons Everywhere!"	Mandy Clotworthy	Written by : John Tellegen; Storyboarded by : Rachel Mackey, Derek Moore, David Smith, Marc Wasik and Simon Williams	June 15, 2023
With Dragons now known to all of ICARIS, Tom is overwhelmed with taking care of all dragon problems by himself and the adults don't trust the other riders to help. When a swarm of dragons invade ICARIS, Tom investigates the source while the others contain the dragons. Tom discovers that a trio of rampaging Nadders are driving the other dragons out of their home and struggles to calm them down. The other riders manage to prove themselves to the adults by corralling the dragons using the greatest fear dragons have: eels. Tom is unable to stop the Nadders on his own and Thunder steps up by asserting dominance over the Nadders, allowing Tom to discover the reason they were rampaging is because someone stole Dragonsite from their nest. He promises the other riders not to try to handle everything on his own anymore and they reconcile. Unbeknownst to the riders, Sledkin was the Dragonsite thief and she has plans to get more for her own gain. Dragons discovered : Deadly Nadder
34	2	"Break in Case of Emergency"	Robert Briggs	Written by : Grace Deppe-Waldschmidt; Storyboarded by : Fernando Corrales, Max Lawson and Chris Staggs	June 15, 2023
While the adults leave for a work seminar, Eugene tries to throw a party with the dragons against the objections of D'Angelo, who was trusted by his father to keep things under control. Things get out of control when D'Angelo and Eugene get trapped in the ICARIS hangar and can't get out without alerting their parents. In the end, the riders get everything back to normal and Eugene takes the blame for all the trouble to avoid getting D'Angelo in trouble.
35	3	"Undercover"	Andrew Collins	Written by : Bethany Armstrong Johnson; Storyboarded by : Manny Banados, Ian Milne and Derek Moore	June 15, 2023
Jun attempts to get her mother to let her contribute to the study of dragons but fails to get her attention. Sledkin offers sympathy to Jun and convinces her to let the riders take her into the Hidden World, against Tom's wishes. Suspicious of Sledkin, Tom, Alex, and Eugene sneak into Sledkin's office and discover she has been stealing Dragonsite, but Jun doesn't believe them thinking Sledkin is the first adult to value her contributions. That night, something agitates the dragons, and the riders follow them to discover the source of the disturbance. They find Sledkin conducting unethical experiments on Terrible Terrors using what she learned in the Hidden World to force them to heat up Dragonsite and study the results. The riders free the dragons from Sledkin, who reveals she was just using Jun for her own gain, and May forbids Sledkin from conducting unauthorized experiments. Aware of Sledkin's real nature, May asks Jun to help her with the study of dragons so she can't trick her, much to Jun's delight.
36	4	"Webs’ Masters"	Robert Briggs	Written by : John Tellegen and Ricky Roxburgh; Storyboarded by : Tong Bui, Fernando Corrales, Ingrid Kan, Lauren Krieger, Max Lawson and Chris Staggs	June 15, 2023
While having some fun of the slopes of the Ice Realm, Webmaster and Eugene stumble upon a gateway that leads to a sixth realm, where everything is Giant. Their time to explore is short lived though as they come across a pack of Deathgrippers who have the ability to mind control Dragons through a single sting. When Webmaster get stung by them, Eugene goes after his dragon and eventually manages to use their bond to snap him out of the venom's mind control. After the Deathgrippers are eaten by a massive dragon, the riders leave with Eugene and Webmaster's bond stronger than ever. Dragons discovered : Deathgripper Realm discovered : Giant Realm
37	5	"Sledkin Stakeout"	Andrew Collins	Written by : Bethany Armstrong Johnson; Storyboarded by : Manny Banados, Ian Milne and Derek Moore	June 15, 2023
Sledkin is put on suspension for her previous unauthorized and unethical experiments, much to the joy of the dragon riders. Soon after, the riders discover human explosives were set off in the Nature Realm and injured a Cavern Crasher. D'Angelo treats the dragons wounds and the riders suspect Sledkin, but she has the alibi of not leaving her house since she was on suspension. The riders then suspect Buzzsaw, but he is proven innocent when another explosion goes off while they confront him. When they head to the source of the explosion, they catch Sledkin and Linda illegally mining for dragonsite. Sledkin refuses to let the valuable cache of dragonsite be taken away and the resulting struggle ends up detonating Sledkin's explosives and causing a cave in that traps the dragon riders. When they are unable to dig the riders out, Sledkin and Linda leave them to suffocate. The riders are rescued by the same Cavern Crasher D'Angelo helped and they expose Sledkin's activities by finding a tunnel into the Hidden World under her house. Sledkin escapes with Linda and Olivia reveals that Dragonsite can produce Oxygen when heated, which is what allows life to exist in the Hidden World. Realizing Sledkin's mining could leave the Hidden World uninhabitable, the riders resolve to stop her
38	6	"Poison Control"	Mandy Clotworthy	Written by : Mark Henry; Storyboarded by : Federico Ferrari, Rachel Mackey, Derek Moore, David Smith and Simon Williams	June 15, 2023
When Buzzsaw sets his eyes on stealing the Book of Dragons, he poisons the Thunder with darts and gives them until sundown to exchange the book for the antitode. D'Angelo realizes there might be a cure when a Hobgobbler proves immune to the poison and believes it could be the flowers it eats. The riders find the flowers, but when they don't cure Thunder, Tom reluctantly takes the book to exchange for the antidote. Buzzsaw doublecrosses Tom and reveals there was never an antidote, but D'Angelo is able to save the day by discovering the cure isn't the flowers, but the slugs that live in them. D'Angelo creates a cure and saves Tom and Thunder. Even though Buzzsaw gets away with the book, he is unable to read the runes that it is written in. However, he is able to extract information about dragon hunting weapons from the book's illustrations.
39	7	"In Too Deep"	Mandy Clotworthy	Written by : Ricky Roxburgh; Storyboarded by : Federico Ferrari, Rachel Mackey, Derek Moore, David Smith and Quynh Truong	June 15, 2023
With the information from the book's illustrations, Buzzsaw is able to capture a new dragon called an Octo Fin from an ocean in the giant realm. The riders interfere with his plan, causing Buzzsaw to drop the tied-up dragon into the ocean, forcing the riders to steal the ICARIS bathysphere to lower themselves into the ocean to save it. The rescue is complicated by a territorial Shellfire causing the bathysphere to malfunction. Tom risks his life to free the Octo Fin and the dragon returns the favor by bringing them to the surface before they drown. When they return to ICARIS, they discover it is under attack by Buzzsaw, who claims the Hidden World as his domain and threatens retaliation to anyone who trespasses before leaving.

=== Season 7 (2023) ===
No. overall	No. in season	Title	Directed by	Written by	Original release date
40	1	"Hobs and Saw"	Mandy Clotworthy	Written by : John Tellegen; Storyboarded by : Frederico Ferrari, Rachel Mackey, Derek Moore, David Smith and Quynh Truong	September 14, 2023
D'Angelo sets up a new dragon hospital in ICARIS, to his father's disapproval, especially now that Buzzsaw is more dangerous than ever. Things get more complicated when Philip saves an injured Hobgobbler from chocking, the dragons grows attached to him and follows him everywhere, causing trouble. Fed up with the Hobgobbler, Philip shuts down D'Angelo's hospital and bans dragons from ICARIS, kicking out the Hobgobbler. Fearing the Hobgobbler is vulnerable while injured, D'Angelo goes after it into the Ice Realm with a remorseful Philip. Meanwihle, Tom and the other dragon riders try to steal back the Book of Dragons from Buzzsaw, but he unveils new dragon hunting weapons that forces them to retreat. During the search for the Hobgobbler, D'Angelo realizes his father shut down the hospital because he wants him to become an army ranger like he was instead of a veterinarian and he stands up to his father, declaring he doesn't have to follow in his father's footsteps to make a difference in the world. Their arguing attracts a Speed Stinger that attacks and the Hobgobbler returns and saves them from it. The experience causes Philip to understand his bond with the dragon and he also accepts D'Angelo's decision to become a veterinarian.
41	2	"Hearts of Heroes"	Robert Briggs	Written by : Grace Deppe-Waldschmidt; Storyboarded by : Fernando Corrales, Steven Gordon and Max Lawson	September 14, 2023
While thwarting Buzzsaw's attempts to expand into the Giant Realm, Tom gets into an argument with Jun when he is unable to admit his feelings for her. Buzzsaw traps the two inside a giant tree filled with a new type of dragon called Woodchippers and tries to destroy the tree with them inside. Realizing the only way out is to get the help of the Woodchippers queen, the two try to bond with it, but the Woodchipper queen senses their hostility from their previous argument and becomes aggressive, especially after arguing restarts when Jun is also unable to admit her feelings for Tom. With some help from their dragons, the two are finally able to admit their love for each other and bond with the Woodchipper queen. The Woodchippers create an exit and help the riders chase off Buzzsaw and Tom and Jun reveal their new relationship to the others.
42	3	"Heart of Glass"	Andrew Collins	Written by : FM De Marco; Storyboarded by : Manny Banados, Ian Milne and Derek Moore	September 14, 2023
The Dragon riders continue their adventures in the Hidden world, but Tom finds that Thunder is having some trouble with being a leader to the other dragons. Things get wilder and more difficult upon the discovery of a seventh Realm that represents a large desert protected by a large Glass-breathing dragon while chasing Sledkin. While the riders and Sledkin are forced to work together to escape, Thunder gets his chance to become the leader he was always meant to be and helps to drive off the dragon, but Sledkin escapes. Back in ICARIS, Tom and Jun, while reading some books on ancient myths, discover that the Desert Realm and the troll-like Glass Caster Dragon was the original inspiration for the Norse world of Svartalfhiem, home of the Dwarfs. They soon realize that the Nine Realms of the Norse culture was Hiccup Haddock's way of describing the Hidden world of the dragons, with seven realms found and two still left to discover. Dragons discovered : Glass Caster Realm discovered : Desert Realm
43	4	"In the Cards"	Robert Briggs	Written by : Mark Henry; Storyboarded by : Fernando Corrales, Steven Gordon and Max Lawson	September 14, 2023
When the riders can't seem to get along, Jun proposes holding a tarot reading to foresee the future. However, the cards predict that the team will break up and it only makes their teamwork falter. A new dragon who isn't afraid of eels bypasses the line of fake eels around ICARIS and the team's discord makes their search for it more difficult. They eventually discover the culprit is a Typhoomerang, who calls another of its kind and the two begin a flaming mating ritual that threatens to destroy ICARIS. The team's arguing makes them unable to work together and their dragons end up stopping and redirecting the Typhoomerangs into the fissure where their ritual can do no harm all on their own. Recognizing they aren't the team they used to be, the riders disband. Dragons discovered : Typhoomerangs
44	5	"Eugene's Lean Mean Extreme Dream Team"	Andrew Collins	Written by : Ricky Roxburgh; Storyboarded by : Manny Banados, Ian Milne and Derek Moore	September 14, 2023
With the team disbanded, Eugene is left alone to deal with Flame Throwers invading the Ice Realm and he decides to form a new team of riders with Alex's Moms and Nibbles. However, his attempts at training his new team end in disaster and Eugene tries to solve the Flame Thrower problem on his own. Meanwhile, Tom and Jun spy on Buzzsaw as he tries to join forces with Sledkin, who has the knowledge to decipher the Viking runes in the Book of Dragons. Eugene almost manages to catch the Flame Throwers, but Nibbles triggers a trap that captures him and Webmaster and alerts Buzzsaw and Sledkin. The riders briefly reunite to escape, and Sledkin takes in Nibbles, liking his bad attitude. Despite their success the riders are unable to bring themselves to reform the team.
45	6	"404 Alex Not Found"	Mandy Clotworthy	Written by : Grace Deppe-Waldschmidt; Storyboarded by : Abby McKenzie, Rachel Mackey, David Smith and Quynh Truong	September 14, 2023
Alex becomes fed up with the other kids relying on her to fix all their tech problems and when an argument with Tom leads to her tablet being damaged, she runs off. Meanwhile, Buzzsaw and Sledkin can't agree between finding dragonsite or finding a dangerous dragon mentioned in the Book of Dragons, leading Buzzsaw to storm off. Realizing how much they've been taking advantage of Alex, the other riders get her moms help in repairing her tablet and search for her to apologize. However, Buzzsaw finds and captures Alex, who tricks him into thinking she's joining his side. Alex lures him into the crystal maze where she steals the Book of Dragons from him and is rescued by the other riders, who return her tablet and apologize for how they treated her. With the book reclaims, Alex shows the group the picture of the monstrous dragon Buzzsaw is after. Despite losing the book, Buzzsaw's plans are saved when Sledkin reveals she took pictures of it on her phone.
46	7	"Rise of Jörmungandr"	Robert Briggs	Written by : John Tellegen; Storyboarded by : Chuckles Austen, Fernando Corrales, Lauren Krieger and Max Lawson	September 14, 2023
Upon getting back the Book of Dragons, the riders soon found out that Buzzsaw has been searching for the ultimate predator to all dragons, a massive eel-shaped Dragon named after the Midgard Serpent, Jörmungandr, who is imprisoned within the Dark Realm, also known as Helhiem. The riders head down into the underworld to find the Dark Realm and find a most dreary and desolate place where there is withered life, very little light and red Dragonsite instead of green. As they descend deeper into the realm, they soon begin arguing over all the reasons that they had for splitting up and despising each other with D’Angelo making the biggest fuss. After realizing that the Red Dragonsite is the cause for their heightened aggression, the Dragon Riders reunite to stop Buzzsaw together. Finding the gate of the prison for the World Serpent with a lock that can only be operated by a Fury Dragon like Thunder, the riders find themselves under siege by Buzzsaw and the Sky Torcher as Thunder is forced to open the prison to save Tom. In doing so, Jörmungandr is set free to prey upon them entire Hidden World of Dragons and beyond, leaving the future of all worlds uncertain. Dragons discovered : Jörmungandr Realm discovered : Dark Realm

=== Season 8 (2023) ===
No. overall	No. in season	Title	Directed by	Written by	Original release date
47	1	"How to Train Jörmungandr"	Andrew Collins	Written by : Ricky Roxburgh; Storyboarded by : Manny Banados, Ian Milne and Derek Moore	December 14, 2023
The team attempts to ambush Jörmungandr to return it to its prison, but it fails and all the dragons except Thunder are incapacitated by its poisonous breath. Using the Book of Dragons, Tom learns that Hiccup captured Jörmungandr using a special rattling staff that can enter and control dragons. He finds the staff hidden above Jörmungandr's prison and trains to use it to reimprison Jörmungandr. Tom initially struggles with the staff, but he begins to improve after some encouragement from Jun, who makes him promise not to fight Jörmungandr alone. When Jörmungandr attacks the Nature Realm, Tom tries to evacuate the other dragons and finally manages to master the staff when a Deathgripper attacks during the chaos. Unable to evacuate all the dragons in time, Tom breaks his promise and uses the staff to lure to entrance Jörmungandr back to its prison. However, Jörmungandr breaks free of the trance just before it enters the prison and it destroys the staff before attacking. The other riders save Tom with their recovered dragons, but Jun becomes fed up with Tom's impulsiveness and breaks up with him for breaking his promise not to fight alone.
48	2	"The Great Foster Fake-Out"	Robert Briggs	Written by : FM De Marco; Storyboarded by : Fernando Corrales, Rachel Kim, Lauren Krieger, Max Lawson and Calvin Leung	December 14, 2023
Unable to care for all the dragons displaced by Jörmungandr's rampage, Tom organizes an event for the members of Rakke Town to foster them. While the idea initially works, it becomes complicated when the head of RakkeCorp Mr. Rakke, arrives for a surprise inspection of ICARIS. Unsure whether Mr. Rakke can be trusted to know about dragons, the riders work to hide the dragons from him, especially Jun and Eugene, who have to put their differences aside to fool him. Despite several close calls, they can keep Mr. Rakke from finding the dragons and May praises her children for finally being able to work together. Meanwhile, Sledkin becomes obsessed with finding a special Dragonsite Gem in the Hidden World and decides she'll need a dragon to find it.
49	3	"Science Vs. Nature"	Mandy Clotworthy	Written by : Mark Henry; Storyboarded by : Abby McKenzie, Rachel Mackey, David Smith and Quynh Truong	December 14, 2023
While returning the fostered dragons to the Hidden World, the riders get an idea to use a large dose of Speed Stinger Venom to paralyze Jörmungandr long enough to reimprison it. While Hazel and Carla synthesize the venom, the riders discover that Jörmungandr's poison is destroying the environment of the Hidden World. At the same time, Buzzsaw uses the chaos it causes to capture more dragons than ever. To inject the Speed Stinger venom, Tom, Jun, and Alex decide to steal a ballista from Buzzsaw's camp, with Alex getting caught in the other two's post-breakup awkwardness. They manage to get the ballista while freeing all of Buzzsaw's captured dragons and capturing Buzzsaw's henchman in the process. After getting everything they need, the riders nearly lure Jörmungandr into their trap, but it is ruined when Buzzsaw attacks them on his Timberjack in revenge for raiding his camp and inadvertently causes their one shot of venom to miss. Jörmungandr assumes Buzzsaw was responsible for the attack and chases after him.
50	4	"Of Gods and Monsters"	Andrew Collins	Written by : John Tellegen and FM De Marco; Storyboarded by : Manny Banados, Ian Milne and Derek Moore	December 14, 2023
When Sledkin kidnaps Plowhorn to force the dragon to use her sense of smell to find her gem, the riders have no choice but to search for Buzzsaw since he is the only one who knows where she could be. Buzzsaw finds them first and begs them to help his Timberjack, which was poisoned by Jörmungandr when it chased after him. The riders think Buzzsaw is just trying to trick them, but D'Angelo is willing to believe him because of his vow as a doctor. Buzzsaw is proven to be telling the truth and D'Angelo treats the Timberjack for the poison. Remorseful of what his actions have done, Buzzsaw reveals the location of Sledkin's lab. When the riders raid the lab, they discover Sledkin is already gone, and Linda reveals that the former has become unhinged in her obsession with the dragon gem. Jun realizes Sledkin is hunting for the God's Realm, the source of all oxygen for the Hidden Realm and Alex figures out how to track Sledkin through her phone. With Plowhorn's help, Sledkin finds the God's Realm and even with the interference of the riders and the realm's guardian, a Gem Blaster dragon, she manages to remove the dragon gem. Sledkin reveals she plans to cut off all the oxygen in the Hidden World to wipe all the dragons so she can excavate all the Dragonsite she wants unhindered. With the gem to create oxygen, everyone begins to suffocate, including Sledkin, who almost falls into a deep pit until Tom grabs her arm. Sledkin's greed leads to her demise when she tries to steal the gem instead of pulling herself to safety and Tom loses his grip, causing her to fall into the pit. The riders return the gem to its proper place and restore the source of Oxygen to the Hidden World. Realm discovered : God's Realm
51	5	"Ragnarok"	Mandy Clotworthy	Written by : Ricky Roxburgh; Storyboarded by : Abby McKenzie, Rachel Mackey, David Smith and Quynh Truong	December 14, 2023
52	6	"Ragnarok"	Robert Briggs	Written by : John Tellegen; Storyboarded by : Fernando Corrales, Rachel Kim, Lauren Krieger, Max Lawson, Calvin Leung and Ian Milne	December 14, 2023
Part 1 : When May comes to the idea that if the riders can't stop Jörmungandr, she will have no choice but to permanently shut down ICARIS, this leaves Tom and the riders with the possibility of not only losing their dragons, but also having to split up across the world. When they get an alert that Jörmungandr is attacking the King's Realm, they rush to protect Thunder’s family. Realizing it failed to destroy the realm, Tom is confident that it will return to finish the job, planning to trap it in a new cage, Tom and Jun go gather the ingredients to create a Gronckle Iron gate to trap it. Meanwhile, Eugene and Alex admit their feelings for each other, after Alex is worried about losing Eugene as a friend. The two reconcile with each other, and promise to stay friends. When Tom and Jun return, they work together to set up the Gronckle Iron gate. They wait for Jörmungandr to attack, but it doesn't return. When Alex's sensors suddenly go off, they learn that the God's Realm is under attack, realizing that Jörmungandr tricked them so it could attack unopposed, and initiate Ragnarök. Part 2 : After being tricked by Jörmungandr, Tom and Thunder race to the God's Realm, they reach the realm in time and force it to retreat. But despite saving the God's Realm, Tom fears that Jörmungandr is unstoppable, admitting to Jun that he is not like Hiccup. She shows him that Hiccup's wife, Astrid is also his ancestor and encourages him to be who he is, also reminding him that he wounded Jörmungandr, which means it can be stopped. The riders gather an army of dragons, including the Night Light Elder to assault Jörmungandr, but the Elder is mortally wounded in the battle and passes on his role and power as the Alpha to Thunder. As the fight continues, Jörmungandr goes after D'Angelo, but he is saved by Buzzsaw and a recovered Jack, who manage to scar Jörmungandr, causing it to retreat to the surface. Meanwhile, at ICARIS, May prepares the evacuation, when Jörmungandr suddenly appears and attacks the station. The riders battle Jörmungandr and Tom and Thunder arrive with the Fault Ripper and Sky Torcher. The dragons wear it down so that a lightning blast, through Tom's sword knocks Jörmungandr out cold. Even though the battle is won, ICARIS has been destroyed in the process. After the battle, Jörmungandr back in its prison, Thunder takes his place as the new king of the realms and Tom and Jun resume their relationship. The next day, when the kids visit the lair, they find the dragons have removed their saddles, realizing that the dragons are saying goodbye because the world isn't ready for them. Tom promises to keep their secret safe. Back at ICARIS, everyone is packing up to leave. The riders share a group hug before they part ways. While flying off with his mom in a helicopter, Tom briefly sees Thunder's silhouette in the fissure before it disappears, and says goodbye to him one last time. He then asks Olivia if he can start learning how to fly a helicopter, and immediately receives his first lesson. During the credits, Tom and Jun are still dating, D'Angelo is showing off his vet skills to his parents, Eugene and Alex are hanging out together, the kids are seen keeping in touch with Alex's virtual world, and their dragons are shown raising the next generation in the Hidden World.
