= How to Train Your Dragon =

DreamWorks Animation media franchise

- Created by: Cressida Cowell
- Original work: How to Train Your Dragon (2010)
- Owners: DreamWorks Animation (Universal Pictures) (Note: Paramount Pictures distributed the first animated film, while 20th Century Fox distributed the second animated film as part of DreamWorks Animation's distribution deals with Paramount from 2006 to 2012, and Fox from 2013 to 2017. The distribution rights to the third animated film, as well as the live-action remake films would move to Universal Studios following its acquisition by NBCUniversal in 2016; the first to be distributed by the studio was How to Train Your Dragon: The Hidden World (2019).)
- Years: 2010–present
- Based on: How to Train Your Dragon

Print publications
- Novel: How to Train Your Dragon
- Graphic novels: The Serpent's Heir (2017); Dragonvine (2018)

Films and television
- Films: How to Train Your Dragon (2010); How to Train Your Dragon 2 (2014); How to Train Your Dragon: The Hidden World (2019); How to Train Your Dragon (2025); How to Train Your Dragon 2 (2027)
- Short films: Legend of the Boneknapper Dragon (2010); Book of Dragons (2011); Gift of the Night Fury (2011); Dawn of the Dragon Racers (2014); How to Train Your Dragon: Homecoming (2019); How to Train Your Dragon: Snoggletog Log (2019)
- Animated series: DreamWorks Dragons (2012–2018); DreamWorks Dragons: Rescue Riders (2019–2022); DreamWorks Dragons: The Nine Realms (2021–2023)

Theatrical presentations
- Play: How to Train Your Dragon Live Spectacular (2012)

Games
- Video games: How to Train Your Dragon (2010); Dragons: TapDragonDrop (2012); Dragons: Wild Skies (2012); School of Dragons (2013); Dragons: Rise of Berk (2014); How to Train Your Dragon 2 (2014); Dragons: Legends of the Nine Realms (2022)

Audio
- Soundtracks: How to Train Your Dragon (2010); How to Train Your Dragon 2 (2014); How to Train Your Dragon: The Hidden World (2019); How to Train Your Dragon (2025)

How to Train Your Dragon is a media franchise of DreamWorks Animation based on the book series of the same name by British author Cressida Cowell. It consists of three feature films: How to Train Your Dragon (2010), How to Train Your Dragon 2 (2014), and How to Train Your Dragon: The Hidden World (2019). A live-action remake of the first film was released in 2025, with a sequel scheduled for 2027. The franchise also includes three television series: DreamWorks Dragons (2012–2018), Rescue Riders (2019–2022), and The Nine Realms (2021–2023), as well as six short films: Legend of the Boneknapper Dragon (2010), Book of Dragons (2011), Gift of the Night Fury (2011), Dawn of the Dragon Racers (2014), Homecoming and Snoggletog Log (both 2019).

The franchise primarily revolves around the adventures of a young Viking named Hiccup Horrendous Haddock III (voiced by Jay Baruchel in the animated films, and portrayed by Mason Thames in the live-action films), the son of Stoick the Vast, leader of the Viking island of Berk. Although Hiccup was initially dismissed as a clumsy and underweight misfit, he soon becomes renowned as a courageous dragons expert, alongside Toothless, a member of the rare Night Fury breed as his flying mount and closest companion. Together with his friends, he manages the village's allied dragon population in defense of his home as leader of a flying corps of dragon riders. Upon becoming leaders of their kind, Hiccup and Toothless are forced to make choices that will truly ensure peace between people and dragons. Dean DeBlois, the director of the films, described their story as "Hiccup's coming of age", taking place across a span of five years between the first and second film, and a year between the second and third film.

The original animated films have been highly acclaimed, with each film nominated for the Academy Award for Best Animated Feature, in addition to the first film's nomination for the Academy Award for Best Original Score.

== Films ==
Film	U.S. release date	Director(s)	Screenwriter(s)	Producer(s)
Original animated trilogy
How to Train Your Dragon	March 26, 2010	Dean DeBlois & Chris Sanders	Will Davies, Dean DeBlois & Chris Sanders	Bonnie Arnold
How to Train Your Dragon 2	June 13, 2014	Dean DeBlois	Dean DeBlois	Bonnie Arnold
How to Train Your Dragon: The Hidden World	February 22, 2019	Dean DeBlois	Dean DeBlois	Brad Lewis & Bonnie Arnold
Live-action series
How to Train Your Dragon	June 13, 2025	Dean DeBlois	Dean DeBlois	Marc Platt & Adam Siegel
How to Train Your Dragon 2	June 11, 2027	Dean DeBlois	Dean DeBlois	Marc Platt & Adam Siegel

=== Animated trilogy ===
==== How to Train Your Dragon (2010) ====
How to Train Your Dragon, the first film in the series, was released on March 26, 2010. It was written and directed by Chris Sanders and Dean DeBlois, and is inspired by the 2003 book of the same name by Cressida Cowell. The story takes place in a mythical Fantasy Viking world where a young Viking teenager named Hiccup aspires to follow his tribe's tradition of becoming a dragon slayer. After finally capturing his first dragon the infamous and elusive Night Fury, and with his chance of finally gaining the tribe's acceptance and father's recognition, he finds that he no longer has the desire to kill the dragon and instead befriends it. He soon realizes that to protect the Night Fury (Toothless) he must show the Vikings the truth of dragons. The film grossed nearly $500 million worldwide and was nominated for the Academy Award for Best Animated Feature.

==== How to Train Your Dragon 2 (2014) ====
A sequel, How to Train Your Dragon 2, was confirmed on April 27, 2010. The film was written and directed by DeBlois, the co-director of the first film. Bonnie Arnold, the producer of the first film, also returned, with Sanders, who co-directed the first film, serving as an executive producer for the second instead, due to his work on the film The Croods and its sequel. The film was released on June 13, 2014. All of the cast from the first film – Baruchel, Butler, Ferguson, Ferrera, Hill, Mintz-Plasse, Miller and Wiig –returned for the sequel. New additions include Kit Harington as Eret, Cate Blanchett as Valka, and Djimon Hounsou as Drago Bludvist.

Set five years after the events of the first film, Hiccup and Toothless have successfully united dragons and Vikings on the island of Berk. Now 20 years old, Hiccup is pressed to succeed his father as chieftain. When he discovers a group of dragon trappers led by Drago Bludvist, he goes on a quest to find Drago and stop him, while also coming across his long-lost mother Valka.

==== How to Train Your Dragon: The Hidden World (2019) ====
In December 2010, DreamWorks CEO Jeffrey Katzenberg confirmed that there would also be a third film in the series: "How To Train Your Dragon is at least three: maybe more, but we know there are at least three chapters to that story." DeBlois, the writer, and director of the second and the third film, said that How to Train Your Dragon 2 is being intentionally designed as the second act of the trilogy: "There are certain characters and situations that come into play in the second film that will have to become much more crucial to the story by the third."

The film's release date was changed several times. In September 2012, 20th Century Fox and DreamWorks Animation announced an initial release date of June 18, 2016, which was later changed to June 16, 2016. It was then moved to June 9, 2017, and later to May 18, 2018, taking over the release date of Warner Animation Group's The Lego Movie 2: The Second Part. On December 5, 2016, the release date was pushed back again to March 1, 2019. This was the first DreamWorks Animation film to be distributed by Universal Pictures, after NBCUniversal's acquisition of the company in 2016, and followed DreamWorks' departure from 20th Century Fox after 2017's Captain Underpants: The First Epic Movie. The film was produced by Arnold, and exec-produced by DeBlois and Sanders. Baruchel, Butler, Blanchett, Ferguson, Ferrera, Hill, Mintz-Plasse, Harington and Wiig reprised their roles from previous films. F. Murray Abraham joined the cast as the film's main villain, Grimmel.

Set a year after the events of the second film, Hiccup had become the new chieftain of Berk for dragons and Vikings. His late father had told a younger Hiccup to seek out the haven of dragons, known as "the Hidden World". Upon discovering the Light Fury, a female sub-species of the Night Fury, Toothless falls in love and bonds with her. The Night Fury killer, Grimmel the Grisly, sets out to find and kill Toothless, prompting Hiccup to choose between keeping the dragons or setting them free.

=== Live-action remakes ===
==== How To Train Your Dragon (2025) ====
In February 2023, a live-action remake of the first animated film was announced to be in development, to be produced by Marc Platt Productions and distributed by Universal Pictures, and would mark DreamWorks' first live-action film. Dean DeBlois returned to write and direct, with John Powell returning to write the score. It was originally scheduled for release on March 14, 2025, but due to the 2023 SAG-AFTRA strike, it was delayed to June 13 of that year.

==== How to Train Your Dragon 2 (2027) ====
In April 2025, a live-action remake of the second animated film was officially announced at CinemaCon. It is set to be released on June 11, 2027. On January 15, 2026, it was announced that Cate Blanchett, the original voice actor of Valka in the animated films, will reprise her role. During the month, Ólafur Darri Ólafsson and Phil Dunster joined the cast as Drago and Eret, respectively.

== Television series ==
Three television series make up the DreamWorks Dragons television franchise: DreamWorks Dragons, Rescue Riders, and The Nine Realms. All series in total amount to 223 episodes across 19 seasons of television.

Series	Season	Subtitle	Episodes	Originally released			Status
Series	Season	Subtitle	Episodes	First released	Last released	Network	Status
DreamWorks Dragons	1	Riders of Berk	20	August 7, 2012	March 20, 2013	Cartoon Network	Concluded
DreamWorks Dragons	2	Defenders of Berk	20	September 19, 2013	March 5, 2014	Cartoon Network	Concluded
DreamWorks Dragons	3	Race to the Edge	13	June 26, 2015		Netflix	Concluded
DreamWorks Dragons	4	Race to the Edge	13	January 8, 2016		Netflix	Concluded
DreamWorks Dragons	5	Race to the Edge	13	June 24, 2016		Netflix	Concluded
DreamWorks Dragons	6	Race to the Edge	13	February 17, 2017		Netflix	Concluded
DreamWorks Dragons	7	Race to the Edge	13	August 25, 2017		Netflix	Concluded
DreamWorks Dragons	8	Race to the Edge	13	February 16, 2018		Netflix	Concluded
DreamWorks Dragons: Rescue Riders	1	Rescue Riders	14	September 27, 2019		Netflix	Concluded
DreamWorks Dragons: Rescue Riders	2	Rescue Riders	12	February 7, 2020		Netflix	Concluded
DreamWorks Dragons: Rescue Riders	Specials	Rescue Riders	3	March 27, 2020	November 24, 2020	Netflix	Concluded
DreamWorks Dragons: Rescue Riders	3	Heroes of the Sky	6	November 24, 2021		Peacock	Concluded
DreamWorks Dragons: Rescue Riders	4	Heroes of the Sky	6	February 3, 2022		Peacock	Concluded
DreamWorks Dragons: Rescue Riders	5	Heroes of the Sky	6	May 19, 2022		Peacock	Concluded
DreamWorks Dragons: Rescue Riders	6	Heroes of the Sky	6	September 29, 2022		Peacock	Concluded
DreamWorks Dragons: The Nine Realms	1	The Nine Realms	6	December 23, 2021		Peacock / Hulu	Concluded
DreamWorks Dragons: The Nine Realms	2	The Nine Realms	7	May 5, 2022		Peacock / Hulu	Concluded
DreamWorks Dragons: The Nine Realms	3	The Nine Realms	7	August 18, 2022		Peacock / Hulu	Concluded
DreamWorks Dragons: The Nine Realms	4	The Nine Realms	6	November 17, 2022		Peacock / Hulu	Concluded
DreamWorks Dragons: The Nine Realms	5	The Nine Realms	6	March 2, 2023		Peacock / Hulu	Concluded
DreamWorks Dragons: The Nine Realms	6	The Nine Realms	7	June 15, 2023		Peacock / Hulu	Concluded
DreamWorks Dragons: The Nine Realms	7	The Nine Realms	7	September 14, 2023		Peacock / Hulu	Concluded
DreamWorks Dragons: The Nine Realms	8	The Nine Realms	6	December 14, 2023		Peacock / Hulu	Concluded

=== DreamWorks Dragons (2012–2018) ===
On October 12, 2010, it was announced that Cartoon Network had acquired worldwide broadcast rights to a weekly animated series based on the first film, which was scheduled to begin sometime in 2012. In January 2011, producer Tim Johnson confirmed that work had begun on the series and that, unlike the TV series spin-offs of the films Madagascar, Kung Fu Panda and Monsters vs. Aliens, How to Train Your Dragon's series is much darker and deeper, like the movie. The show is the first DreamWorks Animation series that airs on Cartoon Network instead of Nickelodeon, unlike previous series such as The Penguins of Madagascar, Kung Fu Panda: Legends of Awesomeness and Monsters vs. Aliens, running from June 2015 to February 2018.

Although it was announced that the series would be called Dragons: The Series, TV promos shown in June 2012 revealed a new title – Dragons: Riders of Berk. The series began airing in the third quarter of 2012. John Sanford, the director of seven episodes in the first season, confirmed that there would also be a second season. Jay Baruchel, who voiced Hiccup, also stars in the series, as well as America Ferrera (Astrid), Christopher Mintz-Plasse (Fishlegs), and T. J. Miller (Tuffnut). The second season is accompanied with the new subtitle, Defenders of Berk, replacing the previous Riders of Berk subtitle. Starting with the third season, the series moved to Netflix and is accompanied by the subtitle Race to the Edge. The series serves as a prelude to the second film.

=== DreamWorks Dragons: Rescue Riders (2019–2022) ===
A preschool-oriented series, DreamWorks Dragons: Rescue Riders, premiered on Netflix on September 27, 2019. It features a completely new cast of characters and locale compared to the original films and series, but is set in the same universe. Rescue Riders was moved to Peacock starting with its third season.

=== DreamWorks Dragons: The Nine Realms (2021–2023) ===
Another series, DreamWorks Dragons: The Nine Realms, premiered on Peacock and Hulu on December 23, 2021. Unlike previous entries in the franchise, The Nine Realms is set in the 21st century, specifically around 1,300 years after the events of The Hidden World, and features a new cast of characters.

== Short films ==
=== Legend of the Boneknapper Dragon (2010) ===
Legend of the Boneknapper Dragon is a 16-minute short film which was originally broadcast on Cartoon Network on October 14, 2010 and was released by Paramount Home Entertainment on DVD and Blu-ray on October 15, 2010 as a special feature on the double edition of the first How to Train Your Dragon film. The short film was directed by John Puglisi, written by Peter Steinfeld and reprising the roles of the first feature film's eight actors Jay Baruchel, Gerard Butler, Craig Ferguson, America Ferrera, Jonah Hill, T.J. Miller, Kristen Wiig and Christopher Mintz-Plasse.

Legend of the Boneknapper Dragon follows Hiccup and his young fellows accompanying their mentor, Gobber, on a quest to kill the legendary Boneknapper Dragon. About half the short film is done in traditional animation, showing Gobber's history and his encounters with the Boneknapper, and how he comes to look like he does now.

=== Book of Dragons (2011) ===
Book of Dragons is an 18-minute short film which was released by DreamWorks Animation Home Entertainment on DVD and Blu-ray on November 15, 2011. Written and directed by Steve Hickner and co-written by Bart Coughlin and Joshua Pruett, Book of Dragons stars the voices of Jay Baruchel, Craig Ferguson, America Ferrera, Christopher Mintz-Plasse, Jim Cummings and Tress MacNeille.

The short film shows Hiccup, Astrid, Fishlegs, Toothless and Gobber telling the legend behind the Book of Dragons and revealing insider training secrets about new, never before seen dragons. Book of Dragons shows a total of 14 different dragons, each separated into 7 classes: Stoker (Terrible Terror and Monstrous Nightmare), Boulder (Gronckle and Whispering Death), Fear (Hideous Zippleback and Snaptrapper), Sharp (Deadly Nadder and Timberjack), Tidal (Scauldron and Thunderdrum), Mystery (Changewing and Boneknapper) and Strike (Skrill and Night Fury).

=== Gift of the Night Fury (2011) ===
Gift of the Night Fury is a 22-minute Christmas special directed by Tom Owens, written by Adam F. Goldberg and starring the voices of Jay Baruchel, Gerard Butler, Craig Ferguson, America Ferrera, Jonah Hill, T.J. Miller, Kristen Wiig and Christopher Mintz-Plasse who all reprise their roles from the first How to Train Your Dragon film. It depicts Berk preparing for the Viking winter holiday of Snoggletog, as all the dragons inexplicably fly away on a mass migration, except for Toothless, so Hiccup gives him something to help.

Gift of the Night Fury was released by DreamWorks Home Entertainment on DVD and Blu-ray on November 15, 2011, and was re-released on DVD on October 1, 2013, along with Shrek the Halls (2007) and Merry Madagascar (2009) as part of the DreamWorks Holiday Classics. Gift of the Night Fury was released again on DVD and Blu-ray on October 15, 2019, by Universal Pictures Home Entertainment, as part of the DreamWorks Ultimate Holiday Collection set.

=== Dawn of the Dragon Racers (2014) ===
Dawn of the Dragon Racers is a 26-minute short film which was released on November 11, 2014, as a special feature on the home media releases of How to Train Your Dragon 2, although it was released on DVD separately on March 3, 2015, with the previously released Gift of the Night Fury, Book of Dragons, and Legend of the Boneknapper Dragon included as well under How to Train Your Dragon: The Complete Shorts Collection. Directed by John Sanford and Elaine Bogan and written by Art Brown and Douglas Sloan, the short film features the voices of Jay Baruchel and America Ferrera along with the cast from the Dragons television series.

Dawn of the Dragon Racers takes place three years before the events of How to Train Your Dragon 2, in between the events of Dragons: Defenders of Berk and Dragons: Race to the Edge. In this short film, a hunt for a lost sheep turns into a competition between Hiccup and his friends for the first title of Dragon Racing Champion of Berk.

=== How to Train Your Dragon: Homecoming (2019) ===
How to Train Your Dragon: Homecoming is a 22-minute holiday special which was both released on DVD and aired on NBC on December 3, 2019. Directed by Tim Johnson and written by Jonathan Groff and Jon Pollack, the short film stars a majority of the cast reprising their roles from How to Train Your Dragon: The Hidden World. It won for Best Animated Special Production at the 47th Annie Awards.

How to Train Your Dragon: Homecoming is set ten years after the dragons left the Vikings in How to Train Your Dragon: The Hidden World, but within that film's epilogue. In this short film, Hiccup and Astrid's two children Zephyr and Nuffink believe that dragons are dangerous monsters after finding Stoick's old journals, leading Hiccup and Astrid to bring back the Snoggletog Pageant in order to convince them otherwise. Meanwhile, Toothless and the Light Fury's three Night Light children come to New Berk looking for Hiccup, prompting their parents to go after them.

=== How to Train Your Dragon: Snoggletog Log (2019) ===
How to Train Your Dragon: Snoggletog Log is a 28-minute slow television short film inspired by The Yule Log. It is a single continuous 28-minute shot of a Christmas fireplace with various gags involving the franchise's main characters, Viking and dragon alike, happening every so often. Directed by Tim Johnson and written by Jonathan Groff and Jon Pollack, the short film was released on Hulu and YouTube on December 5, 2019.

== Video games ==
- An action adventure video game released by Activision called How to Train Your Dragon was released for the Wii, Xbox 360, and PS3 gaming consoles. It is loosely based on the film and was released on March 23, 2010.
- A game for Nintendo DS published by Griptonite Games, was also released on March 23, 2010, and published by Activision.
- Dreamworks Super Star Kartz video game was released by Activision on November 15, 2011, for PlayStation 3, Xbox 360, Wii, Nintendo DS, and Nintendo 3DS. The game features 14 different characters from DreamWorks' films – How to Train Your Dragon, Madagascar, Shrek, and Monsters vs. Aliens.
- Dragons: TapDragonDrop, a mobile video game, developed by PikPok, was released on May 3, 2012, on App Store for iPhone, iPad and iPod Touch.
- Dragons: Wild Skies, a 3D virtual world game based on the television series DreamWorks Dragons has been launched on August 27, 2012, on CartoonNetwork.com. The game allows players to find, train and ride wild dragons, including new ones as they are introduced in the series.
- School of Dragons, a 3D educational massively multiplayer online role-playing game produced by JumpStart, game concept was co-created by Producer David Jaloza and Lead Designer Justin Prate was released online in July 2013, after a month-long beta testing. A Facebook version was released in October 2013, followed by an iPad app in December 2013, a version for Android-powered tablets in March 2014, and a version for the PC in 2014. In the game, each player is able to adopt, raise and train a dragon, while learning how they function. The game was shut down on June 30, 2023.
- Dragons Adventure, an augmented reality game, was released in November 2013, exclusively for Nokia Lumia 2520.
- Dragons: Rise of Berk is a free game which allows players to build their own Berk village, send Hiccup and Toothless out on exploration, hatch and collect up to 760 dragons as of November 2024 and train their own dragon at the academy. Developed by Ludia, it was released in May 2014 for iOS, and on June 20, 2014, for Android and Facebook.
- How to Train Your Dragon 2, an action adventure game, was released in June 2014 for Xbox 360, Nintendo 3DS, Wii, Wii U and PlayStation 3. The game was published by Little Orbit.
- Dragons: Titan Uprising was announced by Canadian developer Ludia in November 2018, and released in early 2019.
- Dragons: Dawn of New Riders, an action adventure game, developed by Climax Studios and released in 2019 for Xbox One, PlayStation 4, Nintendo Switch and PC. The game involves the playable characters Scribbler and Patch on their quest to defeat Eir, by exploring the world and its puzzle and battle elements.
- Dragons: Legends of the Nine Realms, an action adventure game, developed by Aheartfulofgames and released in 2022 for Xbox One, PlayStation 4, Nintendo Switch and PC.
- Dreamworks All-Star Kart Racing is a racing video game published by GameMill Entertainment, and includes Hiccup and Astrid as playable racers, along with a race track based on New Berk. The game was released on November 3, 2023, for Nintendo Switch, PlayStation 5, PlayStation 4, Microsoft Windows, Xbox Series X and Series S, and Xbox One.

== Literature ==
=== Comic books ===
A series of comic books, titled Dragons: Riders of Berk, were released by Titan Comics from Titan Publishing Group, starting with the first volume, Dragon Down, on April 30, 2014. The comics were written by Simon Furman and drawn by Iwan Nazif. Other volumes are Dangers of the Deep (2014), The Ice Castle (2015), The Stowaway (2015), The Legend of Ragnarok (2015), and Underworld (2015). Two more comic books were published on February 24, 2016, titled Dragons: Defenders of Berk. The following volumes are The Endless Night (2016) and Snowmageddon (2016).

=== Graphic novels ===
Dark Horse Comics have released a series of graphic novels based on the franchise, starting with How to Train Your Dragon: The Serpent's Heir in 2016. The series was co-written by Dean DeBlois, writer and director of the film series, and Richard Hamilton, writer of Dragons: Race to the Edge, with the production designer of How to Train Your Dragon 2, Pierre-Olivier Vincent, providing cover artwork. The series took place between the events of the second and third film, with the first novel picking up right after the conclusion of the second film.

== Live performance ==
=== Ice show ===
A Broadway-style production titled How to Train Your Dragon on Ice is currently on Royal Caribbean's Allure of the Seas.

=== Arena show ===
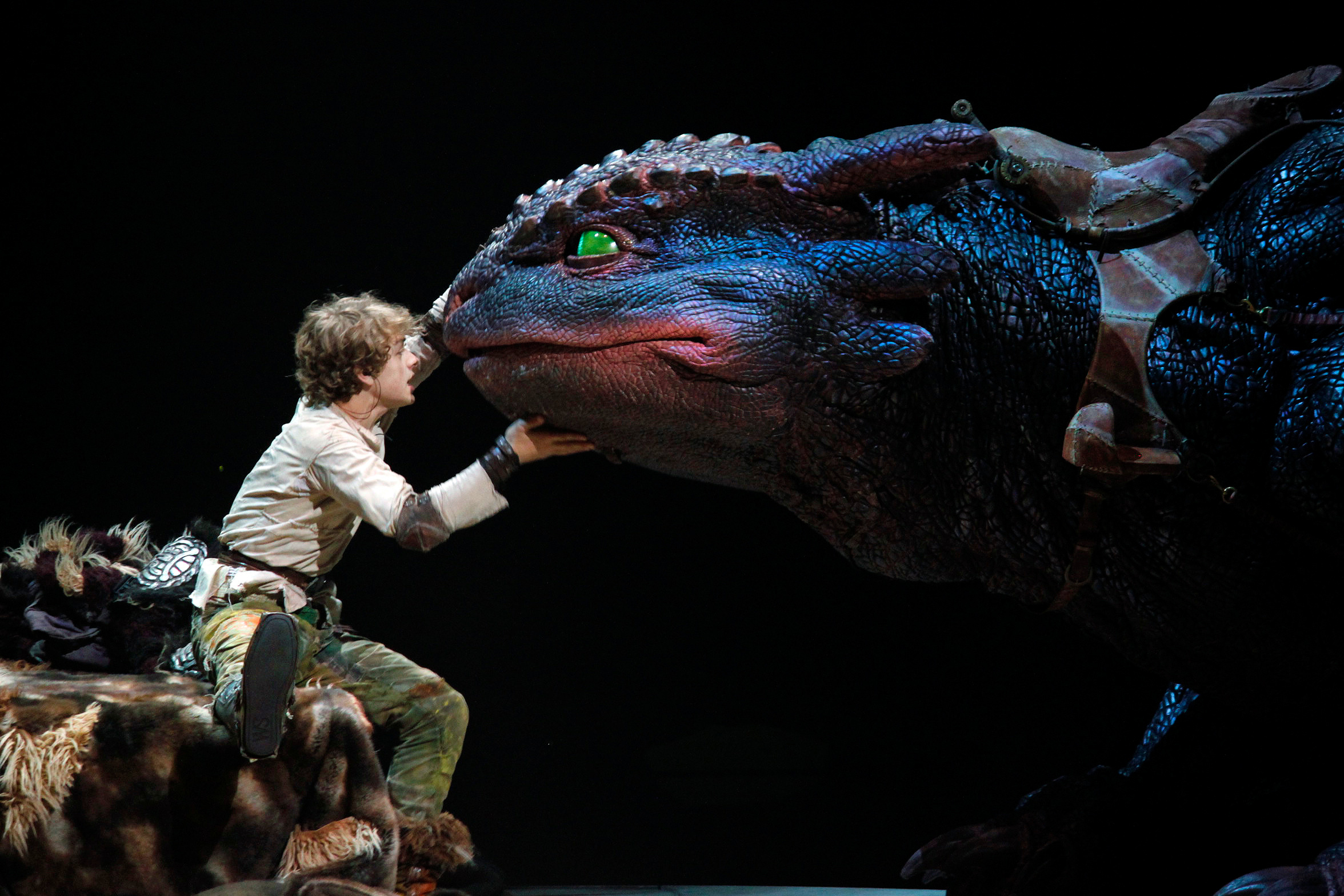
Hiccup and a mechanical model of Toothless at How to Train Your Dragon Live Spectacular

How to Train Your Dragon Live Spectacular or How to Train Your Dragon Arena Spectacular is an arena show adaptation of the original film. The show is being produced in partnership with Global Creatures, the company behind another arena show Walking with Dinosaurs – The Arena Spectacular, and directed by Nigel Jamieson. The score was composed by John Powell and Jónsi from Sigur Rós. Arena Spectacular features 24 animatronic dragons – 10 different species in various sizes: Nadder, Gronckle, Monstrous Nightmare, Night Fury (Toothless), Red Death, Skrill, Stinger, Kite Dragon, Zippleback and Egg Biter. It also features villagers and Vikings, including Hiccup (Rarmian Newton/Riley Miner), Astrid (Sarah McCreanor/Gemma Nguyen), Stoick (Robert Morgan), and Gobber (Will Watkins).

The show premiered as How to Train Your Dragon Arena Spectacular on March 3, 2012, in Melbourne, Australia, and was followed by a New Zealand tour in April 2012. Renamed to How to Train Your Dragon Live Spectacular, it toured United States and Canada between June 2012 and January 2013, when it was cancelled in favour of taking the show to China where it premiered in July 2014. It was also planned to come to England but was later scrapped due to an increase in market demand in China.

== Theme parks ==
=== Heide Park ===
In 2016, the German theme park Heide Park created a whole section of the park offering various rides based on the franchise called "How to Train Your Dragon: The Island". It offers three different flying attractions and a boat ride where guests venture into the dark Dragon Caves to meet and help Hiccup, Toothless and their friends.

=== Motiongate Dubai ===
The Dubai Hollywood-inspired theme park Motiongate Dubai also features a section of the park based on the films and television series. The most prominent attraction is the hanging roller coaster named "Dragon Gliders". Riders join Hiccup, Toothless, Astrid, and Stormfly in flying through the caves of the Forbidden Island, where they come across an unexpected threat. Guests can also meet and greet with Hiccup, Toothless, and Astrid.

=== Universal Theme Parks ===
To promote How to Train Your Dragon: The Hidden World, Universal Studios Florida briefly had a limited-time virtual reality experience where guests could experience riding on Toothless, while Universal Studios Hollywood allowed visitors to meet and greet with Toothless. Universal Studios Beijing's Hollywood Boulevard area contains The Untrainable Dragon, an immersive How to Train Your Dragon-themed stage show with largescale puppets and sets.

==== Universal Epic Universe ====
In January 2024, it was announced that How to Train Your Dragon: Isle of Berk would be one of the five lands of Universal Orlando's third theme park Universal Epic Universe, which opened on May 22, 2025. The land features five attractions, including the Untrainable Dragon show from Beijing, a launch roller coaster called Hiccup's Wing Gliders, a sky fly ride called Dragon Racer's Rally, an interactive boat ride called Fyre Drill, and a children's play area called the Viking Training Camp. Guests can also meet and interact with various characters and dragons from the films. The area's notable dining options include Mead Hall, Spit Fyre Grill, and Hooligan's Grog & Gruel. Mead Hall will serve "Yaknog", a themed drink made of malted chocolate, cinnamon, and whipped cream.

=== DreamWorks Water Park ===
A Proslide KrakenRACER mat racing slide called Dragon Racers opened at DreamWorks Water Park at American Dream in East Rutherford, New Jersey, on October 1, 2020, along with a Proslide and the world's tallest and longest hydromagnetic water coaster called Toothless Trickling Torpedo.

== Reception ==
=== Box office ===
Having earned over $1.6 billion worldwide, How to Train Your Dragon is the 19th highest-grossing animated franchise.

Film	U.S. release date	Box office gross			All-time ranking		Budget (millions)	Ref.
Film	U.S. release date	U.S. and Canada	Other territories	Worldwide	U.S. and Canada	Worldwide	Budget (millions)	Ref.
Animated series
How to Train Your Dragon (2010)	March 26, 2010	$217,581,231	$277,297,528	$494,878,759	208	261	$165	
How to Train Your Dragon 2	June 13, 2014	$177,002,924	$444,534,595	$621,537,519	318	187	$145	
How to Train Your Dragon: The Hidden World	February 22, 2019	$160,799,505	$359,097,143	$519,896,648	388	236	$129	
Live action remake series
How to Train Your Dragon (2025)	June 13, 2025	$262,958,100	$373,242,731	$636,200,831	166	214	$150	
Total		$818,341,760	$1,454,171,997	$2,272,513,757			$589	

=== Critical and public response ===
Film	Critical		Public
Film	Rotten Tomatoes	Metacritic	CinemaScore
How to Train Your Dragon (2010)	99% (208 reviews)	75 (37 reviews)	A
How to Train Your Dragon 2	92% (184 reviews)	77 (48 reviews)	A
How to Train Your Dragon: The Hidden World	90% (271 reviews)	71 (42 reviews)	A
How to Train Your Dragon (2025)	78% (258 reviews)	61 (43 reviews)	A

==== Positive portrayal of disabilities ====
The franchise as a whole has received accolades for its positive portrayal of people with disabilities. The movies have been recognized for depicting multiple characters with disabilities that have their own "narrative purpose" and characters who are not entirely defined by their disability. The franchise has received similar recognition for including characters that are "never portrayed as less capable than any of the other characters" within the films. Commenting on the first film, DeBlois has stated the decision to include these elements were influenced by soldiers returning from wars in Iraq and Afghanistan after having lost limbs.

=== Accolades ===
Ceremony	Year	Category	Nominated work	Result	Ref.
3D Creative Arts Awards	2015	Best Feature Film – Animation	How to Train Your Dragon 2	Nominated	
3D Creative Arts Awards	2015	Best Stereoscopic Feature Film – Animation	How to Train Your Dragon 2	Won	
Academy Awards	2011	Best Animated Feature	How to Train Your Dragon	Nominated	
Academy Awards	2011	Best Original Score	How to Train Your Dragon	Nominated	
Academy Awards	2015	Best Animated Feature	How to Train Your Dragon 2	Nominated	
Academy Awards	2020	Best Animated Feature	How to Train Your Dragon: The Hidden World	Nominated	
Annie Awards	2011	Outstanding Directing in a Feature Production	How to Train Your Dragon	Won	
Annie Awards	2011	Outstanding Writing in a Feature Production	How to Train Your Dragon	Won	
Annie Awards	2015	Best Animated Feature	How to Train Your Dragon 2	Won	
Annie Awards	2015	Outstanding Achievement for Directing in a Feature Production	How to Train Your Dragon 2	Won	
Annie Awards	2015	Outstanding Achievement for Writing in an Animated Feature Production	How to Train Your Dragon 2	Nominated	
Annie Awards	2020	Best Animated Feature	How to Train Your Dragon: The Hidden World	Nominated	
Annie Awards	2020	Outstanding Achievement for Writing in an Animated Feature Production	How to Train Your Dragon: The Hidden World	Nominated	
British Academy Children's Awards	2014	Kid's Vote — Film	How to Train Your Dragon 2	Nominated	
British Academy Children's Awards	2014	Feature Film	How to Train Your Dragon 2	Nominated	
BAFTA Awards	2011	Best Animated Film	How to Train Your Dragon	Nominated	
Chicago Film Critics Association Awards	2014	Best Animated Film	How to Train Your Dragon 2	Nominated	
Chicago Film Critics Association Awards	2019	Best Animated Film	How to Train Your Dragon: The Hidden World	Nominated	
Critics' Choice Movie Awards	2011	Best Animated Feature	How to Train Your Dragon	Nominated	
Critics' Choice Movie Awards	2015	Best Animated Feature	How to Train Your Dragon 2	Nominated	
Critics' Choice Movie Awards	2020	Best Animated Feature	How to Train Your Dragon: The Hidden World	Nominated	
Detroit Film Critics Society Awards	2019	Best Animated Feature	How to Train Your Dragon: The Hidden World	Nominated	
Florida Film Critics Circle Awards	2014	Best Animated Film	How to Train Your Dragon 2	Nominated	
Florida Film Critics Circle Awards	2019	Best Animated Film	How to Train Your Dragon: The Hidden World	Nominated	
Georgia Film Critics Association Awards	2015	Best Animated Feature	How to Train Your Dragon 2	Nominated	
Georgia Film Critics Association Awards	2020	Best Animated Feature	How to Train Your Dragon: The Hidden World	Nominated	
Golden Globe Awards	2011	Best Animated Feature Film	How to Train Your Dragon	Nominated	
Golden Globe Awards	2015	Best Animated Feature Film	How to Train Your Dragon 2	Won	
Golden Globe Awards	2020	Best Animated Feature Film	How to Train Your Dragon: The Hidden World	Nominated	
Grammy Awards	2026	Best Score Soundtrack for Visual Media	How to Train Your Dragon (2025)	Nominated	
Hollywood Film Awards	2014	Hollywood Animation Award	How to Train Your Dragon 2	Nominated	
Hollywood Critics Association Awards	2020	Best Animated Film	How to Train Your Dragon: The Hidden World	Nominated	
Houston Film Critics Society Awards	2015	Best Animated Film	How to Train Your Dragon 2	Nominated	
Houston Film Critics Society Awards	2020	Best Animated Film	How to Train Your Dragon: The Hidden World	Nominated	
International Cinephile Society Awards	2015	Best Animated Film	How to Train Your Dragon 2	Nominated	
Movieguide Awards	2020	Best Movie for Families	How to Train Your Dragon: The Hidden World	Nominated	
National Board of Review Awards	2014	Best Animated Film	How to Train Your Dragon 2	Won	
National Board of Review Awards	2019	Best Animated Film	How to Train Your Dragon: The Hidden World	Won	
Nickelodeon Kids' Choice Awards	2015	Favorite Animated Movie	How to Train Your Dragon 2	Nominated	
Online Film Critics Society Awards	2014	Best Animated Film	How to Train Your Dragon 2	Nominated	
Online Film Critics Society Awards	2020	Best Animated Film	How to Train Your Dragon: The Hidden World	Nominated	
People's Choice Awards	2015	Favorite Family Movie	How to Train Your Dragon 2	Nominated	
People's Choice Awards	2019	Favorite Family Movie	How to Train Your Dragon: The Hidden World	Nominated	
Producers Guild of America Awards	2015	Best Animated Motion Picture	How to Train Your Dragon 2	Nominated	
San Diego Film Critics Society Awards	2014	Best Animated Film	How to Train Your Dragon 2	Nominated	
San Diego Film Critics Society Awards	2019	Best Animated Film	How to Train Your Dragon: The Hidden World	Nominated	
San Francisco Bay Area Film Critics Circle Awards	2019	Best Animated Feature	How to Train Your Dragon: The Hidden World	Nominated	
San Francisco Film Critics Circle Awards	2014	Best Animated Feature	How to Train Your Dragon 2	Nominated	
Satellite Awards	2015	Best Animated or Mixed Media Feature	How to Train Your Dragon 2	Nominated	
Satellite Awards	2019	Best Animated or Mixed Media Feature	How to Train Your Dragon: The Hidden World	Nominated	
Saturn Awards	2015	Best Animated Film	How to Train Your Dragon 2	Nominated	
Saturn Awards	2019	Best Animated Film	How to Train Your Dragon: The Hidden World	Nominated	
Seattle Film Critics Society Awards	2019	Best Animated Feature	How to Train Your Dragon: The Hidden World	Nominated	
Seattle International Film Festival Awards	2014	Golden Space Needle Award – Best Film	How to Train Your Dragon 2	Second runner-up	
St. Louis Film Critics Association Awards	2014	Best Animated Feature	How to Train Your Dragon 2	Nominated	
St. Louis Film Critics Association Awards	2019	Best Animated Feature	How to Train Your Dragon: The Hidden World	Nominated	
Toronto Film Critics Association Awards	2014	Best Animated Film	How to Train Your Dragon 2	Nominated	
Toronto Film Critics Association Awards	2019	Best Animated Film	How to Train Your Dragon: The Hidden World	Nominated	
Visual Effects Society Awards	2015	Outstanding Visual Effects in an Animated Feature	How to Train Your Dragon 2	Nominated	
Washington D.C. Area Film Critics Association Awards	2014	Best Animated Feature	How to Train Your Dragon 2	Nominated	
Washington D.C. Area Film Critics Association Awards	2019	Best Animated Feature	How to Train Your Dragon: The Hidden World	Nominated	

List indicators

This section includes characters who will appear or have appeared in more than two films in the series.

- An empty grey cell indicates the character was not in the film, or that the character's official presence has not yet been confirmed.
- ^{U} indicates an uncredited appearance.
- ^{Y} indicates a younger version of the character.

Characters	Animated film series			Short films				Television series								Television special	Live-action film series	
Characters	HTTYD	HTTYD2	HTTYD: THW	LotBD	GotNF	BoD	DotDR	DD								HTTYD: H	HTTYD	HTTYD2
Characters	HTTYD	HTTYD2	HTTYD: THW	LotBD	GotNF	BoD	DotDR	D:RoB	D:DoB	D:RttE						HTTYD: H	HTTYD	HTTYD2
Characters	HTTYD	HTTYD2	HTTYD: THW	LotBD	GotNF	BoD	DotDR	S1	S2	S3	S4	S5	S6	S7	S8	HTTYD: H	HTTYD	HTTYD2
Hiccup Horrendous Haddock III	Jay Baruchel	Jay Baruchel	Jay Baruchel	Jay Baruchel	Jay Baruchel	Jay Baruchel	Jay Baruchel	Jay Baruchel	Jay Baruchel	Jay Baruchel	Jay Baruchel	Jay Baruchel	Jay Baruchel	Jay Baruchel	Jay Baruchel	Jay Baruchel	Mason Thames	Mason Thames
Hiccup Horrendous Haddock III	Jay Baruchel	Jay Baruchel	A. J. Kane^{Y}	Jay Baruchel	Jay Baruchel	Jay Baruchel	Jay Baruchel	Jay Baruchel	Jay Baruchel	Jay Baruchel	Jay Baruchel	Jay Baruchel	Jay Baruchel	Jay Baruchel	Jay Baruchel	Jay Baruchel	Mason Thames	Mason Thames
Toothless	Randy Thom	Randy Thom	Randy Thom	Randy Thom	Randy Thom	Randy Thom	Randy Thom	Randy Thom	Randy Thom	Randy Thom	Randy Thom	Randy Thom	Randy Thom	Randy Thom	Randy Thom	Randy Thom	Appears	Appears
Stoick the Vast	Gerard Butler	Gerard Butler	Gerard Butler	Gerard Butler	Gerard Butler	Gerard Butler	Nolan North	Nolan North	Nolan North	Nolan North	Nolan North	Nolan North	Nolan North	Nolan North	Nolan North	Gerard Butler	Gerard Butler	Gerard Butler
Gobber the Belch	Craig Ferguson	Craig Ferguson	Craig Ferguson	Craig Ferguson	Craig Ferguson	Craig Ferguson	Chris Edgerly	Chris Edgerly	Chris Edgerly	Chris Edgerly	Chris Edgerly	Chris Edgerly	Chris Edgerly	Chris Edgerly	Chris Edgerly	Craig Ferguson	Nick Frost	Nick Frost
Astrid Hofferson	America Ferrera	America Ferrera	America Ferrera	America Ferrera	America Ferrera	America Ferrera	America Ferrera	America Ferrera	America Ferrera	America Ferrera	America Ferrera	America Ferrera	America Ferrera	America Ferrera	America Ferrera	America Ferrera	Nico Parker	Nico Parker
Snotlout Jorgenson	Jonah Hill	Jonah Hill	Jonah Hill	Jonah Hill	Jonah Hill	Jonah Hill	Zack Pearlman	Zack Pearlman	Zack Pearlman	Zack Pearlman	Zack Pearlman	Zack Pearlman	Zack Pearlman	Zack Pearlman	Zack Pearlman	Zack Pearlman	Gabriel Howell	Gabriel Howell
Fishlegs Ingerman	Christopher Mintz-Plasse	Christopher Mintz-Plasse	Christopher Mintz-Plasse	Christopher Mintz-Plasse	Christopher Mintz-Plasse	Christopher Mintz-Plasse	Christopher Mintz-Plasse	Christopher Mintz-Plasse	Christopher Mintz-Plasse	Christopher Mintz-Plasse	Christopher Mintz-Plasse	Christopher Mintz-Plasse	Christopher Mintz-Plasse	Christopher Mintz-Plasse	Christopher Mintz-Plasse	Christopher Mintz-Plasse	Julian Dennison	Julian Dennison
Tuffnut Thorston	T.J. Miller	T.J. Miller	Justin Rupple	T.J. Miller	T.J. Miller		T.J. Miller	T.J. Miller	T.J. Miller	T.J. Miller	T.J. Miller	T.J. Miller	T.J. Miller	T.J. Miller	T.J. Miller	Justin Rupple	Harry Trevaldwyn	Harry Trevaldwyn
Ruffnut Thorston	Kristen Wiig	Kristen Wiig	Kristen Wiig	Kristen Wiig	Kristen Wiig		Andrée Vermeulen	Julie Marcus	Andrée Vermeulen	Andrée Vermeulen	Andrée Vermeulen	Andrée Vermeulen	Andrée Vermeulen	Andrée Vermeulen	Andrée Vermeulen	Silent role	Bronwyn James	Bronwyn James
Spitelout Jorgensen	David Tennant	David Tennant	David Tennant					David Tennant	David Tennant	David Tennant	David Tennant	David Tennant	David Tennant	David Tennant	David Tennant		Peter Serafinowicz	TBA
Valka		Cate Blanchett	Cate Blanchett												Silent role			Cate Blanchett
Drago Bludvist		Djimon Hounsou	Deleted scene											Hakeem Kae-Kazim	Djimon Hounsou			Ólafur Darri Ólafsson
Eret Son of Eret		Kit Harington	Kit Harington															Phil Dunster
Grimmel the Grisly			F. Murray Abraham															
Nuffink Haddock			Silent role													Liam Ferguson		
Zephyr Haddock			Silent role													Madalyn Gonzalez		
Mulch							Tim Conway	Tim Conway	Tim Conway	Tom Kenny	Tom Kenny							
Trader Johann								Michael Goldstrom	Michael Goldstrom	Michael Goldstrom	Michael Goldstrom	Michael Goldstrom	Michael Goldstrom	Michael Goldstrom	Michael Goldstrom			
Heather								Mae Whitman		Mae Whitman	Mae Whitman	Mae Whitman	Mae Whitman	Mae Whitman	Mae Whitman			
Dagur the Deranged								David Faustino	David Faustino	David Faustino	David Faustino	David Faustino	David Faustino	David Faustino	David Faustino			
Alvin the Treacherous								Mark Hamill	Mark Hamill					Mark Hamill	Mark Hamill			
Gustav								Lucas Grabeel	Lucas Grabeel	Lucas Grabeel	Lucas Grabeel		Lucas Grabeel	Lucas Grabeel	Lucas Grabeel			
Bucket								Thomas F. Wilson	Thomas F. Wilson	Thomas F. Wilson	Thomas F. Wilson							
Viggo											Alfred Molina	Alfred Molina	Alfred Molina	Alfred Molina	Alfred Molina			
Ryker											JB Blanc	JB Blanc	JB Blanc					
Krogan												Silent role	Hakeem Kae-Kazim	Hakeem Kae-Kazim	Hakeem Kae-Kazim			
Mala												Adelaide Kane	Adelaide Kane	Adelaide Kane	Adelaide Kane			
Throk												James Arnold Taylor	James Arnold Taylor	James Arnold Taylor	James Arnold Taylor			
Atali														Rose McIver	Rose McIver			

== Additional crew ==
Role	Animated films			Live-action remake films	
Role	How to Train Your Dragon	How to Train Your Dragon 2	How to Train Your Dragon: The Hidden World	How to Train Your Dragon	How to Train Your Dragon 2
Role	2010	2014	2019	2025	2027
Executive Producer(s)	Kristine Belson; Tim Johnson	Dean DeBlois; Chris Sanders	Dean DeBlois; Chris Sanders	Roy Lee; Dean DeBlois; Chris Sanders; David Cain; Michael A. Connolly	TBA
Writer(s)	Will Davies; Dean DeBlois; Chris Sanders	Dean DeBlois	Dean DeBlois	Dean DeBlois	Dean DeBlois
Composer	John Powell	John Powell	John Powell	John Powell	John Powell
Editor(s)	Darren T. Holmes; Maryann Brandon	John K. Carr	John K. Carr	Wyatt Smith	Paul Machliss
Studio(s)	DreamWorks Animation	DreamWorks Animation	DreamWorks Animation	DreamWorks Animation; Marc Platt Productions	DreamWorks Animation; Marc Platt Productions
Distributor	Paramount Pictures	20th Century Fox	Universal Pictures	Universal Pictures	Universal Pictures
