= DreamWorks Dragons: Rescue Riders =

2019 American animated television series

- Promotional poster
- Genre: Adventure; Fantasy comedy Preschool
- Based on: How to Train Your Dragon
- Developed by: Jack Thomas; Johnny Belt; Robert Scull
- Showrunner: Jack Thomas
- Written by: Jack Thomas; Steve Altiere; Laura Bowes; John Tellegen
- Directed by: Steve Evangelatos; Glenn Harmon; Greg Rankin; T.J. Sullivan
- Voices of: Nicolas Cantu; Brennley Brown; Zach Callison; Skai Jackson; Marsai Martin
- Opening theme: "Rescue Riders Theme" by The Boom Clack
- Composer: Joshua Moshier
- Country of origin: United States
- Original language: English
- No. of seasons: 6
- No. of episodes: 53

Production
- Executive producer: Jack Thomas
- Running time: 24 minutes (episodes); 46 minutes (specials)
- Production company: DreamWorks Animation Television

Original release
- Network: Netflix
- Release: September 27, 2019 – November 24, 2020
- Network: Peacock
- Release: November 24, 2021 – September 29, 2022

Related
- DreamWorks Dragons (2012–2018); DreamWorks Dragons: The Nine Realms (2021–2023)

DreamWorks Dragons: Rescue Riders is an American children’s animated television series in the How to Train Your Dragon franchise produced by DreamWorks Animation Television for Netflix. The show premiered on September 27, 2019, and its second season was released on February 7, 2020. Three specials were released in March, July and November 2020.

In November 2021, the series moved to Peacock for four more seasons. The sixth and final season was released on September 29, 2022.

== Premise ==
The series follows Dak and Leyla, human twins raised by dragons who have developed, as a result, a unique ability to directly communicate with them, helping and rescuing dragons and the people of the town of Huttsgalor.

== Cast ==
=== Main human cast ===
- Nicolas Cantu as Dak
- Brennley Brown as Leyla
- Carlos Alazraqui as Duggard
- Moira Quirk as Hannahr

=== Dragons ===
- Zach Callison as Winger, a male Swiftwing dragon
- Skai Jackson as Summer, a female Fastfin dragon
- Noah Bentley as Burple, a male Rockspitter dragon
- Marsai Martin as Aggro, a female FireFury dragon
- Andre Robinson as Cutter, a male Relentless Razorwing dragon

=== Recurring cast ===
- John C. McGinley as Grumblegard, a male grumpy Foreverhorn dragon
- Secunda Wood as Mama Ironclaw, a female Silver-tailed Ironclaw dragon
- Grey Griffin as Marena, Mrs. Borgomon, and Gemma, a female Golden Dragon
- Sam Lavagnino as Finngard Braun Borgomon
- Roshon Fegan as Elbone
- Donald Faison as Albone
- Patton Oswalt as Oscar, a male Flyhopper dragon
- Brian Posehn as Gludge, a male Sea Gronckle dragon
- Ashley Bornancin as Laburn, a female Fire Fury
- Brett Pels as Cindarnanopusflickerstaff, also called Cinda, a female Fire Fury
- Cassidy Naber as Zeppla, a female Puffertail dragon
- Brad Grusnick as Gill, a male Divewing dragon
- Sumalee Montano as Fathom, a female Divewing
- Renée Elise Goldsberry as Melodia, a female Songwing dragon
- Brett Pels as Cantata, a female Songwing
- Roger Craig Smith as Chillbert, a male Chillblaster dragon, and Raf, a male Ramblefang dragon
- Susanne Blakeslee as Chief Ingrid
- Carlos Alazraqui as Svengard
- Tara Strong as Sparkle, a female Relentless Rainbow Horn
- Charlie Saxton as Whiffy, a male Stinkwing
- Claire Corlett as Blazo, a female Zoomerang
- Zach Callison as Dart, a male Zoomerang
- Nicolas Cantu as Streak, a male Zoomerang
- Max Mittelman as Bubbly, a Bubblegil dragon
- Griffin Burns as Bobbly, a Bubblegil dragon
- Talon Warburton as Talon, a Chaperange dragon
- Nathan Arenas as Splish, a Shocktail dragon
- Danny Pudi as Numo a Memorazo Dragon
- Jeff Bennett as Snoop, a male Slinkwing

=== Antagonists ===
- Brad Grusnick as Magnus Finke
- Jacob Hopkins as Axel Finke, Magnus's nephew
- Carlos Alazraqui as Lurke/Phantom Fang (a male Slinkwing dragon) and Waldondo del Mundo
- Tara Strong as Vizza, a female Slinkwing
- Jeff Bennett as Erik the Wretched
- Mary Elizabeth McGlynn as Svetlana the Sly
- Maurice LaMarche as Arno the "Carnival of Dragons" Ringmaster
- Sam Riegel as Gorsh, a Copycat Dragon

== Series overview ==
Season	Subtitle	Episodes	Originally released		
Season	Subtitle	Episodes	First released	Last released	Network
1	Rescue Riders	14	September 27, 2019		Netflix
2	Rescue Riders	12	February 7, 2020		Netflix
Specials	Rescue Riders	3	March 27, 2020	November 24, 2020	Netflix
3	Heroes of the Sky	6	November 24, 2021		Peacock
4	Heroes of the Sky	6	February 3, 2022		Peacock
5	Heroes of the Sky	6	May 19, 2022		Peacock
6	Heroes of the Sky	6	September 29, 2022		Peacock

== Netflix episodes ==
=== Season 1 (2019) ===
No. overall	No. in season	Title	Directed by	Written by	Original release date
1	1	"The Nest"	Glenn Harmon	Jack Thomas	September 27, 2019
When the Rescue Riders, the Viking twins Dak and Leyla, along with their dragons, Winger, Summer, Cutter and Burple rescue Viking Chief Duggard of Huttsgalor and return him home, they're invited to stay in his village. But not everyone is thrilled at the idea of living with dragons, so they must prove that they can be kind and helpful. After saving the village from a crazy lumberjack machine, Dak, Leyla and their dragons decide to stick around, as they've finally found a place to call home. Dragons discovered: Swiftwing, Fastfin, Relentless Razorwing and Rockspitter (themselves) Waveglider.
2	2	"Deep Trouble"	Glenn Harmon	Steve Altiere	September 27, 2019
When the town fisherman, Elbone, gets lost exploring the Maze Caves on Huttsgalor, a gut-instinct driven Dak takes Winger and Cutter in to save him, but they soon get lost too, leaving a plan obsessed Leyla to save them all before the Maze Caves are flash-flooded. Dak eventually learns to use his head instead of his gut and Leyla learns to stop thinking and just act.
3	3	"Boo to You"	Steve Evangelatos	Jack Thomas	September 27, 2019
It's time for the harvest festival, known as Hoogenboo on Huttsgalor, and everyone's thrilled, but a spooky story about the so-called 'Phantom Fang' scares Burple, who thinks the Ghost is stalking him and his friends don't believe him. The threat of this invisible menace soon comes to light when Leyla finds out that they're being haunted by, not a Ghost, but a nasty food-stealing Dragon. Dragons discovered: Slinkwing
4	4	"Where There's Smoke"	Glen Harmon, Steve Evangelatos, & T.J. Sullivan	Jack Thomas	September 27, 2019
The Rescue Riders next adventure sees them trying to solve a mystery that involves fire, sheep and a cranky Magnus Finke. To solve the mystery, Cutter will have to put aside his pride in order to catch the real arsonist: a hotheaded but misunderstood Fire Fury named Aggro. It's thanks to Aggro, however, that the sheep are safe from wolves and the Rescue Riders welcome a new teammate to their family. Dragons discovered: Fire Fury
5	5	"Heavy Metal"	T.J. Sullivan	John Tellegen	September 27, 2019
When Huttsgalor starts falling apart, the Rescue Riders start searching the Island for Belzium, a mineral that the town Blacksmith, Hannahr, needs to strengthen everything forged from iron. The dragons turn the hunt into a race that eventually traps Dak, Leyla, Winger and Summer in a cave with Magnus. Winger and Summer must get over their desire to win and work with each other and Magnus in order to free themselves and get the Belzium back to town safely.
6	6	"Iced Out"	Glenn Harmon	Steve Altiere	September 27, 2019
After feeling a little left out of the rescues, Aggro decides to prove herself by helping Elbone rescue a dragon egg frozen in ice, but she finds herself in way over her head when she falls into a river of cold water and loses her ability to fly and use her fire. The Rescue Riders will have to move fast to find and rescue their lost friends before they fall off a waterfall with the egg. Aggro apologizes for going off on her own and offers to help the riders take care of their newest dragon, a male infant Hideous Heatwing who they name Heatey. Dragons discovered: Hideous Heatwing
7	7	"Sick Day"	Steve Evangelatos	Laura Bowes	September 27, 2019
After a fun and invigorating game of Volley Rock, all the dragons except Summer contract the 'Dreaded Dragon Flu', a rare disease that causes dragons to lose control of their powers and abilities. With Dak forced to stay behind to take care of his friends, despite his lack of Dragon Medicine Knowledge, Leyla and Summer head off to find the cure. But despite the fact that Fastfins aren't afraid of eels, Summer is scared of them. Can Summer get the cure before the eels get her? And will Dak be able to take care of the Dragons before they tear their home apart?
8	8	"Bad Egg"	T.J. Sullivan	John Tellegen	September 27, 2019
When Magnus Finke overhears Leyla talk about her Dragon Diary, he decides to steal it. To do this, he creates a fake dragon egg for the Riders to rescue and hides inside it. But Cutter sees through his deception and play a prank on him by sealing the egg with Slinkwing Slime and leaves him outside in the cold. His joke goes too far when a Mother Silver-Tailed Ironclaw mistakes the egg for one of her babies and take Magnus back to her nest. Cutter will have to apologize to the riders and the Mother dragon if he has any chance to rescue Magnus and recover the Dragon Diary. Dragons discovered: Silver-Tailed Ironclaw
9	9	"Home Alone"	Steve Evangelatos	Laura Bowes	September 27, 2019
While gathering supplies for training, Burple find three lost Dragon Eggs and brings them back to the Roost. While waiting for them to hatch, Dak, Leyla, Winger and Summer help Chief Duggard find a cave suitable to store grain, but insists that they keep looking so he can keep flying. Meanwhile Aggro, Cutter and Burple, having been arguing about who should be in charge, have to put their differences aside and work together in order to keep the eggs safe from a pack of Slinkwings who want to eat the eggs for dinner.
10	10	"Slobber Power"	T.J. Sullivan	John Tellegen	September 27, 2019
When one of the eggs from the last adventure hatches, Leyla identifies it as a Slobber Smelter. Hoping to be its mother, both Summer and Leyla try to gain its trust, but the dragon decides to imprint on Cutter, much to his chagrin. But Cutter bonding with this dragon and figuring why he likes yellow things may be the key to saving Elbone and the other riders in Thornbane Valley when they get caught up in Tangle Vines, the strongest plant in the world. Dragons discovered: Slobber Smelter
11	11	"Crash Course"	Glenn Harmon	Laura Bowes	September 27, 2019
When Burple gets sick and tired of being last all the time, he tries to learn how to fly faster by secretly trying all of Winger's moves, but he cashes on another island and hurts his wing. Dak, and Winger come to his rescue only for Winger to hurt one of his wings too. They have to work together in order to find their way back home by flying side by side. Meanwhile, Cutter gets stuck in Slinkwing Slime in the Sleep Cave and has the girls take care of him until he breaks free and fakes his being stuck. So the girls prank him to make him admit the truth.
12	12	"Furious Fun"	Steve Evangelatos	John Tellegen	September 27, 2019
After rescuing Finngard, the Rescue Riders discover that he is curious about dragons and wants to learn about them. So Dak and Leyla set up a 'Dragon Day' for him, like a presentation of their powers and abilities. But when Aggro meets two adult Fire Furies named Laburn and Cinda, she starts to have fun with them to the point of being reckless. When she doesn't show up for 'Dragon Day', the Rescue Riders have to ride to the Fire Furies Rescue when they get stuck in mud at Boiling Springs Valley, a dangerous area filled with dozens of deadly steam geysers.
13	13	"Grumblegard (Part 1)"	T.J. Sullivan	Laura Bowes	September 27, 2019
Looking after and taking care of baby dragon sounds like a lot of fun, doesn't it? Not! The Rescue Riders already have their hands full looking after the 4 babies in their care, but things get worse when they adopt 2 infant Piercing Shriekscales and the only source of food for them is on another Island. But that Island is home to a rather large, grumpy but powerful Foreverhorn dragon known as Grumblegard who will not tolerate visitors, trespassers or invaders on his island. Dak, Winger, Burple and Aggro eventually get what they need but make an enemy of Grumblegard, who has followed them to Huttsgalor and he doesn't look happy. Dragons discovered: Piercing Shriekscale and Foreverhorn
14	14	"Grumblegard (Part 2)"	Greg Rankin	John Tellegen	September 27, 2019
Grumblegard follows the Rescue Riders to Huttsgalor and attacks the Village. Winger tries to stop him with a new power, A Mega Blast, a more powerful version of his Power Blast, but it backfires on him. Grumblegard gives the Riders an ultimatum, leave by tomorrow or Huttsgalor will be destroyed. The Riders decide to recruit the Slinkwings to help them stop him, but realize that they've been set up when the Slinkwings take over Grumblegard's home Island. After apologizing to the Riders for the misunderstanding, Grumblegard helps them stop the Slinkwings by giving Winger the confidence he needs to master his Mega Blast. Grumblegard also agrees to take care of the baby dragons so that the Rescue Riders can have a little relief. They part ways as friends having realized that tricking people or dragons is a bad thing and you shouldn't judge a book by its cover.

=== Season 2 (2020) ===
No. overall	No. in season	Title	Directed by	Written by	Original release date
15	1	"Double Finked"	Steve Evangelatos	Steve Altiere	February 7, 2020
Magnus's nephew, Axel, arrives on the island and tells the Rescue Riders that he wants to join their team. But is he just a trickster like his uncle? Dragons discovered: Roaming Ramblefang
16	2	"Divewings"	T.J. Sullivan	Laura Bowes	February 7, 2020
When sea-dwelling dragons called Divewings start attacking ships near the island, the Rescue Riders must figure out what's upsetting them. Dragons discovered: Divewing
17	3	"Mecha-Menace"	Greg Rankin	John Tellegen	February 7, 2020
Magnus and Axel unveil their new "mechano-dragon;" while it's impressive at first, the Riders set out to prove it's no better than a bucket of bolts.
18	4	"Summer Holiday"	Steve Evangelatos	Laura Bowes	February 7, 2020
The Rescue Riders, needing some R&R head to a perfect island getaway for a vacation, but isn't quite what they hoped for.
19	5	"Treasure Riders"	T.J. Sullivan	John Tellegen	February 7, 2020
When a swashbuckling adventurer named Waldondo comes to town, the Riders enthusiastically join him on a treasure hunt for a valuable gem.
20	6	"Puff Enuf"	Greg Rankin	Laura Bowes	February 7, 2020
The Riders find a Puffertail and train her to join the family; she struggles to learn but soon lands a chance to make a big rescue. Dragons discovered: Puffertail
21	7	"Hot, Hot, Hot"	Steve Evangelatos	John Tellegen	February 7, 2020
A moulting Aggro is embarrassed about the big changes she's going through; when she gets stuck in a volcano, the Rescue Riders must seek help from Magnus.
22	8	"High Anxiety"	T.J. Sullivan	Laura Bowes	February 7, 2020
When a mother Ironclaw dragon gets caught high on a mountain and suffers from a broken wing, Hannahr, the blacksmith, has to confront her fear of heights to help out.
23	9	"King Burple"	Greg Rankin	John Tellegen	February 7, 2020
After Burple and Cutter crash land in a village of tiny dragons, Burple's accidental act of courage leads the locals to crown him as their king. Dragons discovered: Flyhopper
24	10	"Charged Up"	Steve Evangelatos	Laura Bowes	February 7, 2020
Magnus' super-powered mechano-dragon threatens to replace the Rescue Riders, then it spirals out of control.
25	11	"Belly Flop"	T.J. Sullivan	John Tellegen	February 7, 2020
Its Summer's birthday and Leyla has made her the perfect gift, a Special Fish dish that no living creature can resist. But when Haggis eats it, Dak tries to make the dish again, only for Winger and Cutter to find out that Dak is a terrible cook. Things only get worse when a Giant Sea Gronckle named Gludge eats Elbone and Summer and he thinks he's done nothing wrong. Dragons discovered: Sea Gronckle
26	12	"Game of Horns"	Greg Rankin	Jack Thomas	February 7, 2020
At a festival, Magnus challenges Duggard in a competition to be chief of Huttsgalor; the Riders must help their friend keep his helmet.

=== Specials (2020) ===
No. overall	No. in specials	Title	Directed by	Written by	Original release date
27	1	"Hunt for the Golden Dragon"	T.J. Sullivan & Greg Rankin	Jack Thomas & Steve Altiere	March 27, 2020
The Rescue Riders must stop three different pirates from getting the Golden Dragon's egg. Dragons discovered: Golden Dragon, Night Fury, Deadly Nadder, Gronckle, Monstrous Nightmare, Hideous Zippleback.
28	2	"Secrets of the Songwing"	T.J. Sullivan & Greg Rankin	Steve Altiere & Laura Bowes	July 24, 2020
A beautiful dragon with a melodious voice hypnotizes Huttsgalor, so Leyla has to overcome her stage fright and use her own singing voice to help everyone. Dragons discovered: Songwing
29	3	"Huttsgalor Holiday"	T.J. Sullivan & Greg Rankin	Laura Bowes	November 24, 2020
During a Christmas-like holiday called Odinyule, unusual weather threatens Huttsgalor. Dragons discovered: Chillblaster

== Peacock episodes ==
Peacock reset the season count after the series moved from Netflix, so the first season on Peacock is actually the third season released for DreamWorks Dragons: Rescue Riders, through to its sixth and final released season (labelled the fourth season on Peacock).

=== Season 1 (2021) ===
No. overall	No. in season	Title	Directed by	Written by	Original release date
30	1	"Chiefless"	Steve Moltzen	Steve Altiere	November 24, 2021
Chief Ingrid of the neighboring island Guttsgalor shows up looking for the ceremonial goblet.
31	2	"Crystal Clear"	Steve Moltzen	Laura Bowes	November 24, 2021
After Elbone goes missing, the Rescue Riders find his boat near an island covered with crystals.
32	3	"How I Met Your Summer"	Steve Moltzen	Jack Thomas	November 24, 2021
The gang is stuck inside during a blizzard; Lelya tells the story of how she met Summer.
33	4	"Snooping Around"	Robert Briggs & T.J. Sullivan	Matt Thornton	November 24, 2021
Snoop, one of the villainous Slinkwing dragons, loses two of Vizza's Slinkwing babies.
34	5	"Oh, Brother"	Greg Rankin	Laura Bowes	November 24, 2021
Elbone's brother, Albone (Donald Faison), pays a visit to Huttgalor; Chief Duggar's tells Elbone to be a Chief for the day.
35	6	"Search for the Sunken City"	Steve Moltzen	Steve Altiere	November 24, 2021
The Riders set out to find the sunken city of Valantis, where dragons and humans once coexisted.

=== Season 2 (2022) ===
No. overall	No. in season	Title	Directed by	Written by	Original release date
36	1	"Teamwork is Magic"	Robert Briggs	Laura Bowes	February 3, 2022
The Rescue Riders meet a seemingly friendly young dragon with a unicorn horn and rainbow powers, but there's something very suspicious about her. Dragons discovered: Relentless Rainbowhorn
37	2	"The Incredible Burple"	Greg Rankin	Will Morey	February 3, 2022
Burple finds a purple crystal that makes him the strongest of all the Rescue Riders.
38	3	"Flight of the Stinkwing"	Steve Moltzen	Laura Bowes	February 3, 2022
After a terrible odor from a Stinkwing blows into Huttsgalor, the Riders fly off to help get rid of the odor and save the day. Dragons discovered: Stinkwing
39	4	"The Big Sheep"	Robert Briggs	Will Morey	February 3, 2022
When Haggis goes missing during a festival, the riders must find him to prevent a conflict that has been going on.
40	5	"Rescue Racers"	Greg Rankin	Laura Bowes	February 3, 2022
When items begin disappearing from Huttsgalor, the Riders cross paths with a pack of Zoomerangs that don't want to give them back. Dragons discovered: Zoomerangs
41	6	"Day without Dragons"	Steve Moltzen	Will Morey	February 3, 2022
Dak and Leyla challenge each other to get through one whole day without their Dragon friends.

=== Season 3 (2022) ===
No. overall	No. in season	Title	Directed by	Written by	Original release date
42	1	"The Inflato-Force Awakens"	Robert Briggs	Laura Bowes	May 19, 2022
When Zeppla and Sparkle returns to Huttsgalor, the Rescue Riders hold out tryouts to find them new members for their team, since they only have 2.
43	2	"Return to the Sunken City"	Greg Rankin	Will Morey	May 19, 2022
The Rescue Riders returns to the Sunken City to stop Magnus from finding the Alpha Crystals with the help of the Bubblegill Dragons Bubbly (Max Mittelman) and Bobbly (Griffin Burns). Dragons discovered: Bubblegill
44	3	"My Dragonguard"	Steve Moltzen	Laura Bowes	May 19, 2022
On his search on finding a gift for Chief Daggard's birthday, Cutter finds himself with a personal bodyguard Chaperange Dragon Talon (Patrick Warburton) after saving his life from danger. Dragons discovered: Chaperange
45	4	"Gludge-Tastic Voyage"	Robert Briggs	Abby Hodge	May 19, 2022
When Gludge accidentally swallows a Boomback dragon egg, Leyla and Aggro must save before it's too late. Dragons discovered: Boomback
46	5	"Dragon Out of Water"	Greg Rankin	Will Morey	May 19, 2022
When a young, bullied, aquatic Shocktail named Splish (Nathan Arenas) meets the Rescue Riders, He decides to live with him since he couldn't seem to stand up being mocked. Dragons discovered: Shocktail
47	6	"Nest Day"	Steve Moltzen	Laura Bowes	May 19, 2022
the Riders are getting ready to celebrate "Nest Day" a tradition from their days in the wild, until they met a dragon that doesn't talk. Dragons discovered: Mimicore

=== Season 4 (2022) ===
No. overall	No. in season	Title	Directed by	Written by	Original release date
48	1	"Full Metal Magnus"	Robert Briggs	Will Morey	September 29, 2022
Metal eating baby dragons followed Magnus back to his workshop and asks the Rescue Riders for help. Dragons discovered: Razor-tooth Metal-maws
49	2	"Triple Trouble Tuesday"	Greg Rankin	Laura Bowes	September 29, 2022
On a wild day in Huttsgalor, one of Magnus' new Mechanos runs amok all over town while Lurke's boosting up his powers, and Elbone's in trouble.
50	3	"Where's Waldondo?"	Steve Moltzen	Will Morey	September 29, 2022
The Rescue Riders tries team up with Marena to save Waldondo del Mundo after he's captured by Erik the Wretched on Pirate Island.
51	4	"The Greatest Showdragons"	Steve Moltzen	Jack Thomas and Steve Altiere	September 29, 2022
Burple finds an old flyer for "The Amazing Arno's Carnival of Dragons" in one of his stomachs, and they told the story of how they met him and Cutter. Dragons discovered: Ramblefang
52	5	"Copy That"	Greg Rankin	Laura Bowes and Will Morey	September 29, 2022
Leyla, Summer and Cutter help Elbone with an important assignment while Dak, Winger, Aggro and Burple fight a copy cat dragon to see who controls the roost. Dragons discovered: Copycat
53	6	"And You Are?"	Robert Briggs	Jack Thomas	September 29, 2022
Dak and Leyla cross paths with a dragon that wipes out memories with a blast and the Dragons might have to find a way to get their memories back. Dragons discovered: Memorazor

== Production ==
The series was first announced on July 22, 2019, alongside fellow DreamWorks Animation Television series Go, Dog. Go!, with T.J. Sullivan directing, Jack Thomas executive producing and Brian K. Roberts as co-executive producer.

== Release ==
The series premiered on September 27, 2019, on Netflix. The series moved to Peacock in November 2021.
