= DreamWorks Dragons: The Nine Realms =

2020s American animated TV series

- Genre: Comedy; Adventure; Science fantasy
- Based on: How to Train Your Dragon
- Developed by: Henry Gilroy
- Showrunners: Chuck Austen (2021–2022); Henry Gilroy (2021–2022); John Tellegen
- Voices of: Jeremy Shada; Ashley Liao; Marcus Scribner; Aimee Garcia; Vincent Tong; Julia Stiles; Lauren Tom; Keston John; Pavar Snipe; Justina Machado; D'Arcy Carden
- Theme music composer: Patrick Cannell
- Composers: John Powell (themes); Patrick Cannell (score)
- Country of origin: United States
- No. of seasons: 8
- No. of episodes: 52 (list of episodes)

Production
- Executive producers: Chuck Austen (2021–2022); Henry Gilroy (2021–2022); John Tellegen
- Running time: 23 minutes
- Production company: DreamWorks Animation Television

Original release
- Network: Hulu; Peacock
- Release: December 23, 2021 – December 14, 2023

Related
- DreamWorks Dragons (2012–2018) DreamWorks Dragons: Rescue Riders (2019–2022)

DreamWorks Dragons: The Nine Realms is an American animated television series in the How to Train Your Dragon franchise produced by the DreamWorks Animation under DreamWorks Animation Television for Hulu and Peacock. The series serves as a spinoff from the original animated trilogy. The voice cast consists of Jeremy Shada, Ashley Liao, Marcus Scribner, Aimee Garcia, Vincent Tong, Julia Stiles, Lauren Tom, Keston John, Angelique Cabral, Justina Machado, Pavar Snipe, Carrie Keranen, and Haley Joel Osment.

The show was announced on October 13, 2021, and premiered on both Hulu and Peacock on December 23, 2021. The show was renewed for six more seasons between May 5, 2022 and September 14, 2023, respectively. The show concluded after its eighth and final season which released on December 14, 2023.

The series received a mixed to negative reception from critics and fans of the original films. While some found it enjoyable for its target audience of younger children, many older fans criticized its animation quality, writing, and divergence from the themes of the original movies and series.

== Premise ==
The series is set in the modern world, 1,300 years after the events of How to Train Your Dragon: The Hidden World (2019). It follows a group of teenagers, brought by their parents to a huge fissure caused by a comet, who uncover a world of dragons beneath their feet. Tom, Thunder and the other riders find themselves entrusted with protecting the secret of dragons from those who would wish to exploit them. Whilst exploring the realms and discovering new dragons, Tom searches for his connection to Thunder and finds himself following in the footsteps of his Viking ancestor.

== Characters and cast ==
=== Main ===
- Jeremy Shada as Thomas "Tom" Kullersen, an adventurous and kindhearted 14-year-old who is the leader of the Dragon Riders and the descendant of Hiccup Horrendous Haddock III and Astrid Hofferson. In Season 7, he becomes Jun Wong's boyfriend. His dragon is a Night Light (a hybrid of Night Fury and Light Fury) named Thunder, who is also the descendant of Hiccup's dragon, the Night Fury Toothless and his mate, the Light Fury.
- Ashley Liao as Jun Wong, Tom's childhood friend who has an interest in myths and fantasy stories. In Season 7, she becomes Tom Kullersen's girlfriend. Her dragon is a two-headed tidal Mist Twister, named Wu and Wei.
- Marcus Scribner as D'Angelo Baker, the team's veterinarian and medic. His dragon is a crystal-horned Gembreaker, named Plowhorn.
- Aimee Garcia as Alexandra "Alex" Gonzalez, the team's tech expert who never goes anywhere without her tablet. Her dragon is a cloaking Featherhide named Feathers.
- Vincent Tong as Eugene Wong, Jun's cocky older brother. He discovers the dragons in season 3 and is accepted into the club. His dragon is a six-legged Deadly Spinner named Webmaster. He is the team's strategic, tactical support and occasionally the leader.

=== Recurring and supporting ===
- Julia Stiles as Olivia Kullersen, Tom's divorced mother and a geologist who works at Project ICARIS. She finally discovers the dragons in the season 4 finale. Like her son, she is also a descendant of Hiccup and Astrid.
- Haley Joel Osment as Leonard "Buzzsaw" Burne, a lumberjack turned dragon-hunter. He starts hunting dragons after a forest fire burns down his logging business which he wrongfully believes Thunder started. He discovers the Hidden World in the season 3 finale, and eventually acquires his own dragon: a Timberjack that he names Old Jack, in the series finale, he reforms and helps the riders defeat the world serpent.
- Carrie Keranen as Wilma Sledkin, a cocky and devious Rakke Corp scientist. She has a bitter rivalry with Olivia and often attempts to discredit her work. She is known for always putting the company's needs above the people she works with. But in season 6, she goes rogue after becoming obsessed with mining Dragonsite, a new gem found in the Hidden World which the dragons depend on.
- Keston John as Philip Baker, D'Angelo's father and the chief of security at Project ICARIS.
- Lauren Tom as May Wong, Jun and Eugene's strict dwarf mother and the director of Project ICARIS.
- Pavar Snipe as Angela Baker, D'Angelo's wheelchair-using mother and the head medic at Project ICARIS.
- Angelique Cabral as Hazel Gonzalez, one of Alex's mothers and a biologist at Project ICARIS.
- Justina Machado as Carla Gonzalez, one of Alex's mothers and a cave botanist at Project ICARIS.
- D'Arcy Carden as Linda, a technician at Project ICARIS. She goes on to become Sledkin's accomplice in the later seasons.
- Al Rodrigo as Ford, a lumberjack who works for Buzzsaw. He later assists him in his dragon-hunting operation, even getting his own dragon.
- Christian Lanz as Winston, a lumberjack who works for Buzzsaw. He later assists him in his dragon-hunting operation, even getting his own dragon.
- Mark Mercado as Dood, a lumberjack who works for Buzzsaw.
- Kimberly Brooks as Wendy, Alex's AI assistant, a parody of Siri.
- Piotr Michael as William Rakke Jr., the CEO of Rakke Corp.
- Keston John as Pete, a security guard at Project ICARIS.

== Episodes ==
Season	Episodes	Originally released
1	6	December 23, 2021
2	7	May 5, 2022
3	7	August 18, 2022
4	6	November 17, 2022
5	6	March 2, 2023
6	7	June 15, 2023
7	7	September 14, 2023
8	6	December 14, 2023

The series was released on both Peacock and Hulu on December 23, 2021, while season two was released on May 5, 2022. The third season was released on August 18, 2022, while the fourth season was released on November 17, 2022. The fifth season was released on March 2, 2023. The sixth season was released on June 15, 2023. The seventh season was released on September 14, 2023. The eighth and final season was released on December 14, 2023.

== Production ==
DreamWorks announced Dragons: The Nine Realms on October 13, 2021. The series was released on Peacock and Hulu on December 23, 2021, with season one containing six episodes for 22 minutes each. The series stars Jeremy Shada. It was produced by showrunners John Tellegen, Chuck Austen and Henry Gilroy.

== Broadcast ==
Outside the United States, it aired on DreamWorks Channel Asia in 2022. In Canada, the series premiered on YTV on December 26, 2021. Elsewhere in the world it premiered on; CBBC in the United Kingdom, SX3 in Spain, Panda Kids in Portugal, France 4 in France, La Trois in Belgium, RTS 1 in Switzerland, Super RTL in Germany and e.tv in South Africa in 2022 and PIE Channel in Philippines on November 13, 2023.

== Video game ==
In May 2022, DreamWorks Animation and Universal announced that a game based on the series is in the works titled Dragons: Legend of the Nine Realms, published by Outright Games and developed by Aheartfulofgames, making this their second DreamWorks game since Spirit: Lucky Big Adventure. The game tells an original story before from the series and players get to play as Thunder, Tom's dragon, trying to find his family in the hidden world. The game was released on September 23, 2022, with Jeremy Shada reprising his role as Tom, narrating through.
