= List of DreamWorks Dragons episodes =

DreamWorks Dragons is an American animation series airing on Cartoon Network (for the first two seasons) and Netflix (after the second season) based on the 2010 film How to Train Your Dragon. The series serves as a bridge between the first film and its 2014 sequel. A one-hour preview consisting of two episodes aired on August 7, 2012, with the official premiere of the series on September 4, 2012. 118 episodes of DreamWorks Dragons were released, concluding the series on February 16, 2018.

The series was announced by Cartoon Network on October 12, 2010. According to Tim Johnson, executive producer for How to Train Your Dragon, the series was planned to be much darker and deeper than DreamWorks Animation's previous television series spin-offs, with a similar tone to the movie. DreamWorks Dragons was the first DreamWorks Animation series to air on Cartoon Network rather than Nickelodeon.

DreamWorks Dragons features the voice talents of Jay Baruchel, America Ferrera, Christopher Mintz-Plasse, Julie Marcus, Andrée Vermeulen, T. J. Miller, Zack Pearlman, Chris Edgerly and Nolan North. The eighth and final season of DreamWorks Dragons: Race to the Edge was released on February 16, 2018.

== Series overview ==
Season	Subtitle	Episodes	Originally released		
Season	Subtitle	Episodes	First released	Last released	Network
1	Riders of Berk	20	August 7, 2012	March 20, 2013	Cartoon Network
2	Defenders of Berk	20	September 19, 2013	March 5, 2014	Cartoon Network
3	Race to the Edge	13	June 26, 2015		Netflix
4	Race to the Edge	13	January 8, 2016		Netflix
5	Race to the Edge	13	June 24, 2016		Netflix
6	Race to the Edge	13	February 17, 2017		Netflix
7	Race to the Edge	13	August 25, 2017		Netflix
8	Race to the Edge	13	February 16, 2018		Netflix

== Cartoon Network episodes (2012–14) ==
The first two seasons of the series aired on Cartoon Network.

=== Season 1: Riders of Berk (2012–13) ===
The first season is subtitled Riders of Berk. The series begins where the first movie leaves off, featuring 15–16 year old characters.

No. overall	No. in season	Title	Directed by	Written by	Original release date	US viewers (millions)
1	1	"How to Start a Dragon Academy"	Anthony Bell	Mike Teverbaugh & Linda Teverbaugh	August 7, 2012	2.05
Having made peace and now living among the Vikings, the dragons' natural behavior leads to chaos on the Isle of Berk. This causes Stoick to reconsider allowing the dragons to roam freely on Berk. It is up to Hiccup and his friends to convince him otherwise.
2	2	"Viking for Hire"	John Sanford	Art Brown & Douglas Sloan	August 7, 2012	2.05
The peace with the dragons has put Gobber out of business as a weaponry blacksmith. Feeling responsible, Hiccup tries to help find a new job for Gobber, however Gobber's slightly eccentric and overenthusiastic personality makes this difficult.
3	3	"Animal House"	John Eng	Mike Teverbaugh & Linda Teverbaugh	September 4, 2012	2.04
The dragons unintentionally cripple Berk's food productivity by terrifying the local livestock, and with the year's first winter storm coming, the dragon-riding Viking youths of Berk must try and familiarize the local animals with their dragon companions if they are to have enough food for the winter.
4	4	"The Terrible Twos"	Louie del Carmen & Joe Sichta	Jim Cooper	September 11, 2012	1.81
Hiccup finds an injured baby dragon in the woods. Noting that this dragon is an undocumented species, he takes it in for care and closer study. Fishlegs names it a "Typhoomerang", but Toothless appears jealous and does not warm up to the energetic newcomer. Meanwhile, the baby's mother makes her way toward Berk to find her lost son.
5	5	"In Dragons We Trust (Part 1)"	John Sanford	Art Brown & Douglas Sloan	September 18, 2012	1.79
The dragons are blamed for vandalism, and Hiccup tries to prove their innocence by forming a night patrol called the "Dragon United Monitoring Brigade" (DUMB), but not in time to prevent the dragons' banishment from the island. Hiccup begins to suspect that Mildew is responsible for the damage.
6	6	"Alvin and the Outcasts (Part 2)"	John Eng	Jim Cooper	September 25, 2012	1.67
Continuing from the previous episode, Hiccup attempts to find evidence that Mildew caused the damage to the village, hoping to exonerate the banished dragons. Meanwhile, Alvin the Treacherous of the Outcast Tribe launches a raid on the Isle of Berk in order to find and capture the "Dragon Conqueror".
7	7	"How to Pick Your Dragon"	Louie del Carmen & Joe Sichta	Art Brown & Douglas Sloan and Jim Cooper	October 3, 2012	2.12
Hiccup convinces Stoick to ride a dragon to aid him in his duties as chief, but he quickly insists on riding Toothless on a regular basis, to both Toothless and Hiccup's dismay. Meanwhile, a mysterious dragon has been attacking the tribe's fishing ships.
8	8	"Portrait of Hiccup as a Buff Man"	John Sanford	Jim Cooper	October 10, 2012	1.93
A traditional painted portrait of Berk's Chief and his son exaggerates Hiccup's muscularity and size, which causes him to worry that he is not Stoick's ideal son. Hiccup is determined to prove himself by accomplishing the treasure-hunting quest of Hamish II, a quest that even Stoick and Gobber had not been able to complete.
9	9	"Dragon Flower"	John Eng	Jim Cooper	October 17, 2012	1.80
Immediately after the visit of the renowned Trader Johann, all dragons on the Isle of Berk are mysteriously falling ill. When Mildew is discovered responsible, he is forced to help Hiccup, Stoick, and Gobber find and capture a ferocious water dragon called the Scauldron in order to concoct an antidote before it is too late.
10	10	"Heather Report: Part 1"	Louie del Carmen	Art Brown & Douglas Sloan	November 14, 2012	1.80
The teens of Berk find a mysterious girl named Heather on Thor's Beach. While Hiccup and the other teens openly welcome the newcomer, Astrid's jealousy turns to suspicion when she notices Heather is taking an unusual interest in the Book of Dragons. Unfortunately it is found she was working with the Outcasts and, despite the Dragon Riders' effort, she manages to give the ancient Book of Dragons to Alvin.
11	11	"Heather Report: Part 2"	John Sanford	Mike Teverbaugh & Linda Teverbaugh and Art Brown & Douglas Sloan	November 21, 2012	2.21
Heather's betrayal of Berk caused the Book of Dragons to fall into Alvin the Treacherous' hands, and Heather's imprisonment on Berk. In order to get the book back from Alvin, Astrid disguises herself as Heather and goes into Outcast Territory. Towards the end of her mission, Astrid learns and confirms Heather's true motives for helping the Outcasts – freeing her parents.
12	12	"Thawfest"	John Eng	Jim Cooper and Art Brown & Douglas Sloan	November 28, 2012	1.58
Berk's annual festive sporting competition, the Thawfest games, is underway and all the teens are participating with the dragons for the first time in Viking history. Hiccup is determined to finally best Snotlout, who constantly gloats about being the reigning Thawfest champion, but Hiccup's successes begin to make him arrogant and boastful, much to Astrid's displeasure and disappointment.
13	13	"When Lightning Strikes"	John Sanford	Justin Hook	December 5, 2012	2.23
Sudden lightning storms are endangering the residents of Berk and it is believed that Thor is angry at the island. Mildew leads the superstitious villagers into blaming Toothless, "the unholy offspring of lightning and death itself", for the lightning, leaving Hiccup to find the true answers for Thor's sudden destructive anger.
14	14	"What Flies Beneath"	Louie del Carmen	Jim Cooper and Art Brown & Douglas Sloan	February 6, 2013	1.45
Toothless encounters a Whispering Death that happens to be a rival from his past. Blinded by their grudge against each other, Toothless runs away to confront the rival alone. Hiccup must find Toothless and reason with him before the rivalry turns fatal.
15	15	"Twinsanity"	Louie del Carmen	F.M. De Marco, Mark Hoffmeier, Jack Thomas and Art Brown & Douglas Sloan	February 13, 2013	1.48
Dagur the Deranged visits Berk to renew a peace treaty between the Hooligan Tribe of Berk and the Berserkers, and the dragons are put into hiding to dispel rumours that Berk is training a dragon army, which will make Dagur cancel the treaty. But when Ruffnut and Tuffnut begin to fight, their dragon, Barf and Belch, is left out of control. The Viking teenagers must bring the twins back together to control their dragon and avoid provoking Dagur to war.
16	16	"Defiant One"	John Eng	Art Brown & Douglas Sloan and Jim Cooper	February 20, 2013	1.66
Caught in a waterspout, Toothless' prosthetic tail is damaged, rendering him unable to fly and thus leaving him, Hiccup and Snotlout stranded on Outcast Island. The three must work together to repair the damage, overcome the rivalry between Hiccup and Snotlout and return home to Berk before they are captured by Alvin and the Outcasts.
17	17	"Breakneck Bog"	John Sanford	Art Brown & Douglas Sloan	February 27, 2013	1.41
When Hiccup discovers Trader Johann's ship was shipwrecked in a rumored haunted bog with a gift made for him by his mother, he will stop at nothing to retrieve it -not even being followed by a "fog monster".
18	18	"Gem of a Different Color"	John Eng	Mike Teverbaugh & Linda Teverbaugh and Art Brown & Douglas Sloan	March 6, 2013	1.59
When Snotlout and the villagers mistake color-changing dragon eggs for gems that bring good fortune, Fishlegs, who is responsible for the eggs' discovery, must take a stand against Snotlout, who is trying to sell the eggs, and reunite them with their Changewing mothers before they destroy Berk.
19	19	"We Are Family: Part 1"	John Sanford	Art Brown and Douglas Sloan	March 13, 2013	1.83
During Berk's annual Bork week celebrations, Hiccup is granted access to Bork the Bold's private and personal archives. When he finds information and a map about an island inhabited by Night Furies within Bork's notes, Hiccup is determined to bring Toothless to his family. After discovering that the Bork notes are fakes made by the Outcasts, the duo tries to flee, but are captured by Alvin.
20	20	"We Are Family: Part 2"	Elaine Bogan & John Sanford	Mike Teverbaugh & Linda Teverbaugh and Art Brown & Douglas Sloan	March 20, 2013	2.23
After being captured, Hiccup discovers that Mildew has joined the Outcasts. However, Mildew is also imprisoned as he's no longer of any use to Alvin now that he has Hiccup. Hiccup reluctantly allows Mildew to help him find Toothless and escape Outcast Island, a final test for Mildew's loyalty to Berk. After Hiccup and Toothless escape, Mildew betrays the Dragon Riders, revealing that Mildew's imprisonment has also been a trick, allowing Alvin to train a Whispering Death.

=== Season 2: Defenders of Berk (2013–14) ===
The second season is subtitled Defenders of Berk.

No. overall	No. in season	Title	Directed by	Written by	Original release date	US viewers (millions)
21	1	"Live and Let Fly"	Anthony Bell	Art Brown and Douglas Sloan	September 19, 2013	1.77
Concerned that Alvin and the Outcast Tribe are planning an attack on Berk, Stoick institutes flight restrictions on the dragon academy. Certain that Alvin will also use his newfound dragon-training knowledge to bolster any attack, Hiccup forms a secret "Dragon Flight Club" in order to train the kids to defend Berk against a potential dragon army-not realizing that Stoick's flight ban was for everyone except Stoick himself. Alvin and the Outcasts then attack Berk, and while the riders are defending against the attack, Savage plants Whispering Death eggs in the caverns under Berk.
22	2	"The Iron Gronckle"	John Sanford	Jack Thomas	September 26, 2013	1.41
When Fishlegs and Meatlug are kicked off the Dragon Academy by Snotlout they arrive at a beach, and Meatlug eats all the rocks in sight. Fishlegs, on the other hand, eats all the berries. Soon they get a stomach ache and return to Berk to get Meatlug checked by Gobber. Fishlegs discovers that Meatlug can produce "Gronckle Iron", a lightweight but extremely strong metal. Because their slow speed had previously allowed an Outcast boat to escape, Fishlegs decides that producing Gronckle Iron is a more helpful task than flying with the other teens, until Meatlug ends up ingesting a magnetic rock, attracting all the metal in the village-including Hiccup's metal leg.
23	3	"The Night and the Fury"	Louie del Carmen	Jack Thomas	October 3, 2013	1.09
The teens are doing a training exercise led by Astrid, to their disappointment: in the task, one must cross the island of dragons from one end to the other, at night, with no dragons, and one weapon. During this daring task, Hiccup encounters Dagur, his "brother" from the Berserker tribe. Dagur is hunting for the Night Fury that he thought Hiccup battled. He apparently has been hunting for many nights and has gone, well, Berserk. It is up to Hiccup and his friends to protect Toothless.
24	4	"Tunnel Vision"	Elaine Bogan and John Eng	Mark Hoffmeier	October 10, 2013	1.39
When the town's well runs dry, Hiccup and Toothless discover the group of baby Whispering Death dragons in the tunnels underneath the village planted there by Alvin and the Outcasts, and discover a new dragon subspecies, the Screaming Death. The teens must drive the Screaming Death and the Whispering Death hatchlings away from the village before they destroy Berk.
25	5	"Race to Fireworm Island"	John Sanford	F.M. De Marco	October 17, 2013	1.34
Ever since the Screaming Death and his team of Whispering deaths roamed Berk, Snotlout has been pushing Hookfang to high limits. Soon enough Hookfang is in deep trouble as his flame goes out, so it's a race to Fireworm Island to help restore Hookfang's flame before it is too late.
26	6	"Fright of Passage"	Louie del Carmen	F.M. De Marco	October 24, 2013	1.24
Every decade, Arvandil's Fire arrives at Berk, inviting a ghostly dragon, the Flightmare, to the village. Astrid, however, is absolutely determined to take the Flightmare down as her Uncle was paralyzed and sadly was torn by the vicious Flightmare as young Astrid stood by and watched her family name be ruined by the vicious creature as everyone on Berk accused her uncle "Fearless Finn" of having frozen in fear at the sight of the Flightmare. So with the help of Fishlegs, Hiccup and their dragons, they discover that the dragon uses a paralyzing mist to attack and plan to drive the Flightmare away.
27	7	"Worst in Show"	John Sanford	F.M. De Marco, Mark Hoffmeier, & Jack Thomas and Art Brown & Douglas Sloan	November 7, 2013	1.56
When the team has an argument about who is the best dragon trainer, a "competition" take place to see who is the best dragon trainer, despite Hiccup being the only member who keeps telling them that it is not a competition. They each receive a Terrible Terror and are given one day to train it and teach it tricks and/or skills. While Fishlegs is wrapped up in trying to beat Snotlout, he fails to notice that Meatlug caught Outcasts sneaking into Berk, which leads to her being captured.
28	8	"Appetite for Destruction"	Elaine Bogan & Adam Henry	Mark Hoffmeier & Jack Thomas	November 14, 2013	1.34
When nearby islands begin to disappear and the dragons that used to inhabit them begin migrating to Dragon Island, the teens discover that the cause of this is the Screaming Death, who has returned. The Screaming Death happened to be digging shafts underneath the islands that were large enough to cause the islands to collapse into the sea, forcing dragons to abandon their homes. The teens have to stop the Screaming Death before it reaches Berk.
29	9	"Zippleback Down"	Louie del Carmen	Mark Hoffmeier and Art Brown & Douglas Sloan	November 21, 2013	1.19
Barf and Belch are Tuffnut's only guard when he gets caught in an old dragon trap in the forest. Things go from bad to worse when Tuffnut is faced with not only a fully-grown Torch (the young Typhoomerang that the gang befriended in Season One), but also an incoming deadly forest fire that threatens him and the dragons.
30	10	"A View to a Skrill: Part 1"	Elaine Bogan	Jack Thomas	December 5, 2013	1.42
When the dragon riders discover a Skrill, a lightning-powered dragon revered by the Berserkers, that happens to be frozen in ice, they scramble to get it off Berk. But when the Skrill is thawed out and unleashed, Hiccup and Toothless are faced with a battle between both the Skrill and Dagur the Deranged's Berserker armada (also hunting the Skrill), which could prove to be more than Hiccup and Toothless can handle. During the battle, the twins witness Alvin in an Outcast ship capturing the Skrill.
31	11	"A View to a Skrill: Part 2"	John Sanford	Mark Hoffmeier	December 5, 2013	1.46
When Alvin the Treacherous captures the Skrill, Hiccup, Ruffnut, and Tuffnut go undercover to discover that a truce is in the process of being formed between the Outcasts and the Berserkers to invade Berk with the Skrill as their weapon. Dagur is giving Alvin the support of his vast fleet in exchange for the Skrill, but the truce is uneasy. The trio must now flee to release the Skrill from their control before the truce can be settled. However, Dagur betrays Alvin, claiming that because the Skrill is the Beserker's emblem, that they have full control over it, and gets rid of him. Dagur then attempts to take on Hiccup and Toothless with the Skrill, but he doesn't have Hiccup's experience with dragons and the dangerous Skrill proves more than either of them can handle. Hiccup and Toothless manage to lure the Skrill into a glacier, freezing it once again.
32	12	"The Flight Stuff"	Louie del Carmen	F.M. De Marco, Mark Hoffmeier, Jack Thomas and Art Brown & Douglas Sloan	January 8, 2014	1.82
Snotlout becomes convinced he is dying, having seen "The five signs of Valhalla", claiming that after seeing a singing tree, falling chickens, and sheep chasing him, etc, that he would die, and wants young Gustav to be his replacement, including taking care of Hookfang in case he died. But when Snotlout "miraculously" recovers (the five signs he saw really being pranks played by Ruffnut and Tuffnut), he takes his dragon back, and Gustav decides to get a dragon of his own (named Fanghook) and join the academy… whether they want him to or not, especially as the Dragon Riders plan to stop Dagur the Deranged's new plan.
33	13	"Free Scauldy"	Adam Henry	Jack Thomas	January 15, 2014	1.55
While on patrol for the Screaming Death, Hiccup, Toothless, Fishlegs and the twins discover a Scauldron with an injured wing on Changewing island. The Scauldron rebuffs their attempts for help, but Ruffnut seems to calm it down. She trains the dragon and the gang are able to help it. Ruffnut sacrifices her long braids in order to finish the support for the wing before the Changewings get them.
34	14	"Frozen"	John Sanford	F.M. De Marco	January 22, 2014	1.46
After rescuing Trader Johann, Hiccup and Toothless return from a mission to find Berk mysteriously empty. They discover that the village has been overrun by Speed Stingers, a non-flying dragon that move at blindingly fast speeds and can paralyze their victims with their tails. The Speed Stingers have trekked across the frozen sea to Berk and driven everyone out of town. Now Hiccup must find a way to drive the Speed Stinger horde away from Berk before their next raid.
35	15	"A Tale of Two Dragons"	Louie del Carmen	F.M. De Marco, Mark Hoffmeier, Jack Thomas and Art Brown & Douglas Sloan	January 29, 2014	1.46
Hiccup must mend bridges between Astrid and Snotlout when Stormfly and Hookfang start fighting. Astrid and Snotlout must grudgingly work together to find the cause of the feud if they want their dragons to stay in the academy. Meanwhile, Fishlegs discovers Dragon Root, which could end up affecting not just Stormfly and Hookfang but all their dragons.
36	16	"The Eel Effect"	Adam Henry	Sam Cherington	February 5, 2014	1.88
While gathering an eel for medicine for an Eel Pox epidemic on Berk, Toothless accidentally eats a red eel attacking Hiccup after he falls into eel-infested waters. This causes Toothless to come down with the dragons' version of Eel Pox, skittish and uncontrollable fire power. To make things worse, the ingredients needed to cure the illness are in Toothless' satchel and all but Fishlegs are caught sick. With little time to lose, Hiccup and Fishlegs must find a way to cure Toothless and get the ingredients for the cure back to Berk.
37	17	"Smoke Gets in Your Eyes"	Elaine Bogan	F.M. De Marco	February 12, 2014	1.87
When Trader Johann delivers mass quantities of metal to Berk that came from Breakneck Bog, the island becomes infested with Smothering Smokebreaths that steal the town's metal to build a new nest. With no metal, and therefore no weapons to protect their village, Hiccup and the others must find a way to get rid of the rogue dragons, only to discover that the Smokebreaths' appearance was planned as an attack by Dagur the Deranged.
38	18	"Bing! Bam! Boom!"	Louie del Carmen	Art Brown & Douglas Sloan	February 19, 2014	1.56
When three baby Thunderdrums follow Hiccup and Stoick back to Berk, the trio of Dragons prove to be a handful for the Dragon Academy to train. When the baby dragons are forced to live on Dragon Island after nearly destroying Berk, the group learns they can't survive without a parent, so Stoick releases Thornado so he can take care of them, the two parting reluctantly.
39	19	"Cast Out: Part 1"	Adam Henry	F.M. De Marco, Mark Hoffmeier, Jack Thomas and Art Brown & Douglas Sloan	February 26, 2014	1.64
After Snotlout accidentally puts Astrid in a near-death situation, Hiccup suspends him from the academy for disobeying the rules one time too many. However after he and Hookfang are ambushed by the Screaming Death on Snotlout's secret island, "Snotland"', he is rescued by Alvin the Treacherous, who has returned to Berk, claiming he is there to make amends with the Vikings. Despite the fact that nobody trusts him, Alvin's warnings allow them to defeat Dagur's invasion, but before they can destroy Dagur he captures Stoick; Dagur flees back to Outcast Island with his captive, demanding Hiccup and Toothless in exchange for Stoick's life.
40	20	"Cast Out: Part 2"	John Sanford	F.M. De Marco	March 5, 2014	1.75
Hiccup is forced to work with Alvin in order to save his father from Dagur's wrath. But when Alvin and Mildew help him discover what the Screaming Death has been after all along, he comes up with a plan to end the war between the Outcasts and Berk, stop Dagur, get rid of the Screaming Death, and save Berk once and for all.

== Netflix episodes: Race to the Edge (2015–18) ==
The series is subtitled Race to the Edge on Netflix. The series comes after the short film Dawn of the Dragon Racers (as the pilot episode) and the beginning is set about three years after the second season and the end a few months (most likely one or two) before the events of How to Train Your Dragon 2, with the main characters aged 19 or 20. Netflix counts the seasons for Race to the Edge separately from Dreamworks Dragons as a whole, so the first season on Netflix is the third season overall, through to its sixth and final released season being the eighth season overall.

=== Season 3 (2015) ===
No. overall	No. in season	Title	Directed by	Written by	Original release date
41	1	"Dragon Eye of the Beholder, Part 1"	Elaine Bogan	FM De Marco & John Tellegen & Jack Thomas and Art Brown & Douglas Sloan	June 26, 2015
It has been three years since the war with the Berserkers, and Hiccup and his friends are enjoying life. But when Dagur the Deranged escapes from the prison on Outcast Island, he decides to take his revenge on Hiccup. Hiccup and the dragon riders, thanks to Johann, band back together and track him down to a fog bank beyond their borders, discovering a huge graveyard of ships filled with treasures that Dagur would use to build a new armada. In the commander's quarters of "The Reaper", Hiccup finds a very mysterious device, and after a struggle with Dagur all of the group, apart from Hiccup, are trapped in a cage. Dagur fires a boulder from a catapult onto The Reaper, causing the ship to sink, leaving Hiccup with a choice: retrieve the device he found from Dagur or save his friends from certain death.
42	2	"Dragon Eye of the Beholder, Part 2"	Elaine Bogan	Art Brown & Douglas Sloan	June 26, 2015
Hiccup goes to save the other riders, but discovers that the cage is 'Dragon-Proof'. After much effort, they finally get it open and Hiccup is able to retrieve the device from a distracted Dagur. Back on Berk, Hiccup asks Gobber and Gothi about the device which he dubs 'The Dragon Eye'. Gothi tells them that the key to unlocking the 'Dragon Eye' is a tooth from the Snow Wraith (a Strike class Dragon that detects body heat as a form of sight). The riders and Gothi travel to Glacier Island to retrieve the tooth. Meanwhile, Gobber takes Gothi's place as the village healer; however, he is far from good at it. Hiccup, after fiddling around with the Eye, finds that it is activated by the fire of any Dragon and works as a light projector showing him maps, writing and Dragons he's never seen. He then quotes, "This changes ... everything!"
43	3	"Imperfect Harmony"	Jae Hong Kim	Art Brown & Douglas Sloan	June 26, 2015
The riders start to explore the maps they have seen on the 'Dragon Eye' and go far from Berk to the point that they decide that they need an island base just for themselves. They come across an island that they think is perfect only to wake in the morning to find that their dragons have been trapped by an amber-spitting dragon they call the Deathsong. In an attempt to free their dragons, all of the group apart from Hiccup get trapped by the dragon. With the help of a wild Thunderdrum, Hiccup uses Monstrous Nightmare gel that Snotlout brought with him to warm the hardened mucus and free the group.
44	4	"When Darkness Falls"	Elaine Bogan	Jack Thomas	June 26, 2015
The riders finally find an island that will be perfect for an outpost. Unknown to them, a new species of dragon living on the Island, known as the 'Night Terrors', lives there too, and they ambush and scare Tuffnut. After the group traps the leader dragon, they realise how much danger the rest of the dragons are in when Changewings begin attacking them. They suddenly realize that the Night Terrors, under the command of their Alpha, a white Night Terror, need to flock into a shape of a giant version of themselves or any other dragon they wish as a defense mechanism to scare off threats or predators. The dragon riders fight off the Changewings and free the leader. The leader then befriends the riders as the natural protector of them and the island.
45	5	"Big Man on Berk"	T.J. Sullivan	John Tellegen	June 26, 2015
Back on Berk, Stoick has asked the riders to deal with a Scauldron which is in the waters around Berk. It becomes apparent that Fishlegs has become allergic to something, with many suspecting it's Meatlug. Gothi hypnotizes Fishlegs in an attempt to rid him of the allergy; however, due to Snotlout talking during the hypnosis, Fishlegs now thinks he is the all-mighty, all-conquering warrior viking called Thor Bonecrusher, who is loved by everyone and has no fear of anything. In "Thor"'s attempt to tame the Scauldron, Meatlug comes under attack, and the fear for Meatlug's safety is the only thing to snap Fishlegs out of the hypnosis. Later, it was discovered that Fishlegs was allergic to Gobber's ear wax which he has been using on Meatlug's saddle.
46	6	"Gone Gustav Gone"	Elaine Bogan	FM De Marco	June 26, 2015
Gustav visits the riders on Dragon's Edge saying he is now ready to be trained, as promised by Hiccup, to be a proper dragon rider. After much delaying and 'keeping Gustav busy' by the riders, Gustav takes the Dragon Eye to go on a treasure hunt. When the riders find out, they make it clear to him that he is too immature to become a rider. When Gustav runs away from the island in the night, Dagur captures him and Fanghook, whereby Gustav appears to become a part of their crew, claiming he knows how to get Dagur the Dragon Eye. A trade takes place, but Gustav decides to stay with Dagur. He later double-crosses Dagur returning the Dragon Eye to Hiccup and saving both of them in the process. Hiccup also discovers a new series of lenses for the 'Dragon Eye'.
47	7	"Reign of Fireworms"	T.J. Sullivan	Art Brown & Douglas Sloan	June 26, 2015
It becomes apparent that the twins are the rightful and lawful owners of the island on which the riders have made base. They enforce their royalty rights immediately getting the other riders doing meaningless and annoying tasks. During all this, Fireworm dragons start arriving on the island as part of their migration. However, being Fireworm dragons, they start burning the island down. After the twins throw everyone in the 'dungeon' they realize they need the other riders to stop the island becoming a pile of ash. They agree that all the group are equal owners to the island and they in turn agree to help. It is only the Night Terrors forming the shape of the Fireworm Queen that gets the Fireworms to leave the island.
48	8	"Crushing It"	T.J. Sullivan	FM De Marco & Mike Hoffmeier & John Tellegen & Jack Thomas and Art Brown & Douglas Sloan	June 26, 2015
The riders are tracking down an elusive Rumblehorn that is going around their island base scaring all the dragons away. At the same time, Gobber appears and warns Hiccup of an unpleasant change in Stoick back on Berk that is currently driving everyone crazy. Hiccup enlists the aid of his father in tracking down the Rumblehorn, but Stoick comes to question its intentions upon discovering it. They eventually learn the Rumblehorn has been attempting to warn everyone of an approaching tsunami and chase them off before the wave would wipe them all out. With the aid of Stoick and the Rumblehorn, the riders create a wall to block the wave and protect the island. In the end, it is revealed that Stoick missed Thornado, but in turn comes to bond with the Rumblehorn, who becomes his new dragon Skullcrusher.
49	9	"Quake, Rattle and Roll"	Jae Hong Kim	FM De Marco	June 26, 2015
Experimenting with the Dragon Eye allows Fishlegs to find the location of Dark Deep, the ancestral home island of the Gronckles. Upon landing there, they find the island has been taken over by a massive new Boulder class dragon called the Catastrophic Quaken. Its dangerous behavior forces the other Gronckles to leave and seek refuge on Dragons' Edge, much to everyone's dismay. Determined to win back Dark Deep for the Gronckles, Fishlegs allows Snotlout to train him in fighting dirty behind Hiccup's back in order to beat the Quaken and drive it off, but they quickly find themselves outmatched once they confront it directly. They eventually learn the Quaken's behavior was out of loneliness and defensive instinct, and allow it to remain and share the island with the Gronckles.
50	10	"Have Dragon Will Travel, Part 1"	David M. V. Jones	Art Brown and Douglas Sloan	June 26, 2015
While gathering supplies, the riders hear of a rogue dragon rider attacking ships and stealing their provisions. They identify the rider's dragon with the Dragon Eye as a Razorwhip and pursue it to a remote island. One by one the riders are picked off by the rogue until Hiccup and Toothless chase her down and she reveals herself to be Heather, with her new dragon Windshear. The group mostly welcomes her back with open arms, but Hiccup is suspicious of her new, more aggressive behavior. Following her to Trader Johan's ship, Hiccup interrogates Johan and learns that Heather's island was attacked and her parents killed by Dagur, whom she pursues for revenge while stealing supplies to help rebuild. Heather meanwhile tracks down Dagur alone, but is captured by his new armada.
51	11	"Have Dragon Will Travel, Part 2"	T.J. Sullivan	John Tellegen	June 26, 2015
Hiccup manages to rescue Heather, and though she is still determined to take revenge, Hiccup persuades her to leave it for another day. On the way back to Dragons' Edge, Heather reveals that the parents she lost were adoptive, and all she has to remember her birth father is an old horn. When they return, the riders re-welcome Heather while offering their support, and she and Astrid take the time to bond. Together they meet with Johan, who reveals Dagur's plans to purchase new dragon-proof ships and weaponry, and they convince the riders to launch a surprise attack. They manage to successfully capture Dagur, but Hiccup intervenes before Heather can kill him, revealing that her horn was a gift from Stoick to Oswald the Agreeable, her father, meaning that Dagur is her brother. Dagur offers her the chance to join with the Berserkers, but she refuses. In the end, Heather decides to leave, saying she has much she needs to figure out.
52	12	"The Next Big Sting"	T.J. Sullivan	FM De Marco	June 26, 2015
Hiccup is testing a prototype wingsuit when the riders come across an injured adolescent Speed Stinger. Hiccup elects to nurse it back to health, but Snotlout opts to leave it on account of its paralyzing abilities. The riders take it back and nurse its leg to health when Fishlegs discovers the Stinger has gained webbed feet as a result of evolution. Snotlout and Ruffnut kidnap the Stinger and are taking it back to its pack when they and the rest of the riders are attacked by the other Speed Stingers, who have similarly evolved. The young Speed Stinger decides to help the riders chase off the pack, and, with its help and Hiccup's new wingsuit, drive the Stingers back across the sea. The young Stinger is torn between its pack and the riders, but Hiccup convinces it to go back with its family.
53	13	"Total Nightmare"	Jae Hong Kim	Richard Hamilton & John Tellegen & Jack Thomas	June 26, 2015
The riders are in the middle of training when Hookfang begins behaving strangely after hearing a mysterious call. Following him, the riders find that he has mated with a female Monstrous Nightmare. Convinced that Hookfang has reverted to his old feral nature, Snotlout decides to resign from being a dragon rider. When he returns to say goodbye, he discovers that Hookfang has really been helping the female protect her eggs from a Titan Wing Monstrous Nightmare. Snotlout and Hookfang join forces to gain dominance over the Titan Wing and drive it away, saving the eggs and their mother.

=== Season 4 (2016) ===
No. overall	No. in season	Title	Directed by	Written by	Original release date
54	1	"Team Astrid"	Elaine Bogan	Jack Thomas	January 8, 2016
The riders return to Berk upon receiving a distress letter to find the village in ruins after a hit-and-run attack by Dagur's armada. Astrid, after seeing her home destroyed, decides to train a new team of Dragon Riders. Many recruits apply, including Gustav, Gothi, Bucket, Mulch, and Spitelout, but Hiccup takes notice of her overly harsh regiment and points out she wants her students to fail so she has a reason to stay on Berk and protect her family. Hiccup returns to find Dagur laying siege to Dragons' Edge and sends word for back up. Astrid and Stoick appear as reinforcements, but the odds are still against them until the trainees appear and fend off the attackers. Though they receive reprimand, Astrid promotes them to full Riders with Gustav as the leader and remains on Dragons' Edge.
55	2	"Night of the Hunters, Part 1"	Jae Hong Kim	John Tellegen	January 8, 2016
During a morning flight, Astrid and Stormfly encounter a band of mysterious dragon hunters on the beach, led by Ryker Grimborn, who captures Stormfly while leaving Astrid adrift. After finding her, the riders scour the beach and the wreck of the Reaper for clues on their whereabouts, but only find a new lens for the Dragon Eye that works with a Changewing's acid. The new map displays the location of a port the hunters are on their way to, and though at first the attack is successful, Ryker reveals he is one step ahead. Only Hiccup and Snotlout manage to escape while the others are captured. While imprisoned, they reunite with Heather, who has now joined forces with her brother and is apparently working together with Ryker.
56	3	"Night of the Hunters, Part 2"	Elaine Bogan	Jack Thomas	January 8, 2016
After interrogation by Dagur and Heather, Astrid learns the hunters are looking for the Dragon's Eye, which was lost to them years ago. Though Ryker attempts to break them by showing their dragons imprisoned, the riders hold their silence. They attempt to escape but are captured again, and when Dagur proposes to kill them, Heather convinces Ryker to keep them as slaves. Meanwhile, Hiccup and Snotlout travel to the island of the Screaming Death where, with help from its mother, they create suits of armor made from its shed scales that make them impervious to the hunters' dragon root tipped arrows. They launch their attack and rescue the others, and both sides prepare for their next encounter.
57	4	"Bad Moon Rising"	Elaine Bogan	Art Brown & Douglas Sloan	January 8, 2016
Fishlegs, Gobber, and the riders are testing a new target made from Gronkle Iron, which Fishlegs learned the recipe for on Ryker's ship, when Tuffnut appears with a strange bite mark. Gobber believes it to be the Lycanwing, a mythic dragon whose bite can turn humans into vicious dragon hybrids, and Snotlout preys on Tuffnut's paranoia making him believe he will become a Lycanwing by the next full moon. Ruffnut tries everything from having Snotlout bitten by other dragons and animals, as well reasoning with him as he is about to jump off a cliff. Hiccup and Fishlegs reveal the Lycanwing legend was invented to protect a pair of Dragon Eye lenses hidden on another island, but Tuffnut is only convinced when Snotlout appears and states he was actually bitten by a wolf, which bites him as well.
58	5	"Snotlout Gets the Axe"	T.J. Sullivan	F.M. De Marco	January 8, 2016
Spitelout comes to Dragon's Edge to announce a union between the Jorgenson and Hofferson clans and charges last pick Snotlout with delivering the Jorgenson family axe to the Isle of Frigga for the ceremony. Upset over his father's lack of faith of him, Snotlout tosses the axe in anger down on an island where it is found stuck to the magnetic hide of a new dragon – the Armorwing. Snotlout uses the Smothering Smokebreaths to get it back, and the riders subsequently help the Armorwing when the greedy little dragons pick apart its metal hide, earning its trust. They deliver the axe late only to discover a fight broke out and the wedding was cancelled. Meanwhile Fishlegs teaches the twins about Viking marriage and Tuffnut, believed to be certified, weds Fishlegs and Ruffnut. Fortunately, Tuff isn't certified and the "union" was broken.
59	6	"The Zippleback Experience"	Jae Hong Kim	Will Morey	January 8, 2016
The twins start an avalanche on the island where the riders are setting up a new watchtower and Hiccup and Toothless save Barf and Belch before they can go over a cliff. As a result, Barf and Belch become indebted to Hiccup and relentlessly follow him around and dote on him, prompting the twins to come up with ways to put Hiccup in danger so their Zippleback will save him and return to them. Hiccup is captured by Ryker and Dagur, but is rescued by Barf and Belch, who in turn are rescued from drowning by the twins, repaying the debt and returning everything to normal.
60	7	"Snow Way Out"	T.J. Sullivan	Douglas Britton & Jack Thomas	January 8, 2016
The riders are testing new battle armor for their dragons when Astrid arrives with intel that the hunters are in search of the Snow Wraith to get a tooth to power the Dragon Eye. Astrid is separated from Hiccup in a snowstorm and finds Heather camped out on a nearby cliff. It is revealed that Heather is acting as a spy and she gave Astrid the information, but when Astrid proposes that they tell Hiccup the truth, Heather declines. Astrid brings the other riders to a cave where the Snow Wraith is hibernating, while Heather's attempts to mislead Ryker fail and he finds the cave on his own. Ryker meets with Hiccup demanding the Dragon Eye, but Heather manages to foil his plan to take it and Ryker instead seals them in the cave, using them to flush out three Snow Wraiths. When Hiccup attempts to take out Heather, Astrid intervenes and tells him and the others about Heather's plan to learn about the hunters' real leader, Viggo Grimborn, whom everyone is afraid of.
61	8	"Edge of Disaster, Part 1"	Elaine Bogan	Art Brown & Douglas Sloan	January 8, 2016
Hiccup, Fishlegs and Snotlout respond to an SOS by Johann that hunters are attacking his ship, but are surprised to find extremely aggressive wild dragons attacking instead. Hiccup, Snotlout and Johann try to devise a plan when Fishlegs ends up held hostage by them. Back on the Edge, Astrid works to set up defenses with the twins and explodes into a heated argument with Ruffnut who says that she does not respect others. Ruffnut is captured by the hunters, whose armada is approaching Dragon's Edge, leaving defense of the island to Astrid and Tuffnut alone.
62	9	"Edge of Disaster, Part 2"	T.J. Sullivan	Art Brown & Douglas Sloan	January 8, 2016
While captive, Fishlegs befriends the wild dragons and sees that they are victims of the hunters, and Hiccup in turn realizes that Johann was led out to the island to lure them away from Dragon's Edge. Back on the island Astrid and Tuffnut manage to fend off the hunters' attacks and Heather keeps them from approaching on foot. When Astrid runs out of ideas, it's Tuffnut's tricks and practical jokes that manage to give them the advantage while Ruffnut escapes on Windshear. Hiccup uses his flight suit to win the trust of the wild dragons and leads them in a counterattack that fends off Ryker and his group. Astrid and Ruffnut reconcile and the riders lead the wild dragons to a new home on the Edge.
63	10	"Shock and Awe"	David M.V. Jones; Jae Hong Kim	Ann Austen & John Tellegen	January 8, 2016
Fishlegs spots a mysterious creature in the cove, but the others, on account of it being "Loki Day," are hesitant to believe him. Upon investigation, they discover it to be a young adult Seashocker, a reclusive twin headed Tidal class dragon, having drifted into the cove after being separated from its pod. Fishlegs is reluctant to let the Seashocker leave in the interest of studying it, but is convinced otherwise after it is injured by Stormfly. In trying to set the Seashocker free, it ends up being chased by a pack of Scauldrons, and Fishlegs, guilty over his trapping the Seashocker, goes to extremes to save it. When it is about to escape into the sea, it ends up cornered by the Scauldrons, but is saved by the rest of its pod. In the end, the twins, who have been pranking everyone without end, receive retribution from the rest of the riders.
64	11	"A Time to Skrill"	David M.V. Jones; Jae Hong Kim	Ricky Roxburgh & FM De Marco & Jack Thomas	January 8, 2016
A sudden attack on Outcast Island and Berk during consecutive lightning storms finds the riders facing off once more against the Skrill, who they discover wants revenge on Hiccup and Toothless for re-burying it in the glacier. Hiccup and Toothless decide to face against it one on one and later lead it into a trap, but the Skrill anticipates their plan and traps them instead. The two escape into the ship graveyard and Hiccup decides to lure it towards Ryker, Dagur, and the hunters to have them incapacitate it. His plan backfires and the hunters capture the Skrill. The riders are cornered in trying to release it, but receive unexpected help from the Skrill itself in sending the hunters away. Just as they are about to imprison the Skrill again, Hiccup decides against it, and the Skrill is set free, finally giving its respect to Hiccup and Toothless.
65	12	"Maces and Talons, Part 1"	Elaine Bogan	Art Brown & Douglas Sloan	January 8, 2016
The riders successfully rescue more dragons from the hunters, leaving Ryker with suspicions about Heather. Their group finally returns and meets the hunters' true leader, Ryker's younger brother Viggo Grimborn, who proposes a secret alliance with Heather in order to oust either Ryker or Dagur as possible traitors. Heather meets with the riders and informs them Viggo is after the Flightmare, but this proves to be a trap by Viggo to eliminate the riders and exposes Heather as a spy. Hiccup plans to use the Flightmare's mist to paralyze the hunters, but Viggo's advanced tactics allow him to escape with the Flightmare, Heather, and Windshear as captives, leaving Hiccup to wonder about their dangerous new opponent.
66	13	"Maces and Talons, Part 2"	T.J. Sullivan	Art Brown & Douglas Sloan	January 8, 2016
The riders return to Dragon's Edge after their disastrous mission to find the island torn apart by Viggo's men, but thanks to Ruffnut, the Dragon Eye remains with them. Intimidated by Viggo's intelligence, Hiccup decides to take a more cautious approach against him, and discovers upon investigating his ship that Viggo has challenged him to a game of strategy with Heather's life as the prize. Hiccup manages to match Viggo's wit and free the Flightmare and Heather with unexpected help from Dagur, but once again Viggo turns the tables and manages to snatch away the Dragon Eye. With the Flightmare's mist, the Eye is reactivated, giving Viggo full access to its powers. The riders are left only with the resolve to reclaim the Dragon Eye before he can use it.

=== Season 5 (2016) ===
No. overall	No. in season	Title	Directed by	Written by	Original release date
67	1	"Enemy of My Enemy"	David M.V. Jones; Jae Hong Kim	Art Brown & Douglas Sloan	June 24, 2016
Months have passed since the riders' defeat at the hands of Viggo, and Hiccup is determined to reclaim the Dragon Eye. His obsession quickly lands him in trouble when he and Toothless are stranded on an island inhabited by the hunters and Toothless is incapacitated by dragon root. Help comes from an unlikely source when Dagur appears and guides Hiccup and Toothless to his hideout, where he explains that he has been living in exile since leaving the hunters and claims to be reformed. Though highly reluctant, Hiccup works together with Dagur to cure Toothless, but the two are captured and Dagur appears to abandon Hiccup, but later comes back riding Toothless to save him. The three escape the island, but Hiccup is still not sure what to make of this old enemy turned ally.
68	2	"Crash Course"	Simon Otto	Art Brown & Douglas Sloan	June 24, 2016
The Fireworm Queen comes to Dragon's Edge to recruit Snotlout and Hookfang for help in warding away a dangerous scavenging predator, the Cavern Crasher. Snotlout is determined to repay the debt he owes to the Queen for saving Hookfang's life to the point where he refuses help from the other riders. As the divided riders struggle against the Crasher's detonative mucus ability, the Queen guides Snotlout and Hookfang to her hive, revealing she needs help defending her babies. When the Queen and riders all unite, it proves to be too much for the invading Crasher, and it retreats. Hiccup credits Snotlout for a job well done and the twins reward him with a carving of his face in a monument back at the Edge.
69	3	"Follow the Leader"	T.J. Sullivan	Art Brown & Douglas Sloan	June 24, 2016
Fishlegs is left in charge while Hiccup and Astrid are out, but Snotlout and the twins show no respect for his authority when they blow up the Edge's cache of Nightmare gel for their amusement. Between this and Hiccup's disappointment, a despondent Fishlegs leaves and discovers a cavern filled with an abandoned colony of albino Night Terrors. He immediately gains their respect when he seals an opening in their cavern that leaks sunlight, even naming one Darkvarg, but things turn sour when they refuse to let him leave. Meatlug goes back to warn the other riders, and with Darkvarg's help and Fishlegs' leadership they all manage to escape. Hiccup reconciles with Fishlegs and assures him that he would not ever hesitate to leave him in charge in the future.
70	4	"Turn and Burn"	David M.V. Jones; Jae Hong Kim	Art Brown & Douglas Sloan	June 24, 2016
Hiccup and Snotlout are in the middle of another argument when Stoick arrives, informing them that Spitelout has been missing for months after going off on a reconnaissance mission to find a location for an emergency storehouse. They find he has already established the storehouse on another island and has been defending it from an attacking Singetail, a powerful Stoker class dragon. The four attempt to work together, but their efforts are hindered by Stoick and Spitelout's constant arguing, and their sons are left to reluctantly take their father's side. Stoick decides to leave, but Hiccup helps him see things from the Jorgensons' point of view and convinces him to return, but when more Singetails arrive, Spitelout decides to abandon the island, stating they will build another storehouse elsewhere.
71	5	"Buffalord Soldier"	Robert Briggs; Jae Hong Kim	FM De Marco	June 24, 2016
Astrid finds a drifting ship while out on patrol and becomes sick with a deadly plague called 'The Scourge of Odin,' upon infection from the dying crew. The only known cure is a solution made from the saliva of a Buffalord, a dragon hunted to extinction centuries ago. Using copied notes from the Dragon Eye, the riders locate a living Buffalord, but it refuses to leave the island where it lives. The only solution is to bring Astrid to the Buffalord, but Viggo also arrives revealing he infected his own men to get the riders to lead him to the Buffalord. Hiccup reluctantly lets Viggo leave with the Buffalord in exchange for the cure, but as soon as his ship leaves it fights back forcing the Hunters to release it. Astrid is cured and the riders hold a funeral for the deceased sailors.
72	6	"A Grim Retreat"	Simon Otto	Art Brown & Douglas Sloan	June 24, 2016
The riders, tired and restless from overwork on defenses for the Edge, convince Hiccup to allow a much-needed vacation on a deserted island paradise. All is well until suddenly the dragons begin to wildly revolt, and the others assume Hiccup's obsessive work regime is to blame. Toothless appears to be the only exception until he too begins to rebel, but the riders discover to be the true cause to be freshwater-dwelling parasitic dragons called Grimoras. One by one the riders cure their dragons using salt water, and agree to take vacations at home while Hiccup promises to lighten up on his Viggo obsession. Meanwhile, Stoick and Gobber, left in charge while the riders are away, lose Tuffnut's pet chicken and each try to replace it with a new one.
73	7	"To Heather or Not to Heather"	T.J. Sullivan	Art Brown & Douglas Sloan	June 24, 2016
After discovering that Fishlegs has been secretly communicating with Heather since the "Viggo Fiasco", the riders decide to invite her to the Edge and convince her to join them. Heather seems to instantly fit in with the riders, but Windshear, used to being Heather's sole protector, complicates things when she acts extremely hostile towards the other dragons as they help with the yearly Nadder Migration. Heather is convinced the only solution is to leave, but Fishlegs discovers a way to use Windshear's protective instincts to the team's advantage and save the others from an ambush by the hunters. That evening, the riders receive a letter from Dagur who says he is looking for Heather, and the riders promise to keep her location secret until she is ready.
74	8	"Stryke Out"	Greg Rankin	Will Morey	June 24, 2016
Hiccup and Toothless accidentally land in a Hunter trap while exploring a nearby hideout, and are made prisoners in a gladiator-type arena where dragons fight each other in wagered bouts. Hiccup tries to tame the imprisoned dragons while Toothless battles in the arena, soon pitted against the resident champion, the Triple Stryke. The other riders interrogate the hunters for information on their whereabouts and trick them into sending word to the arena and following the Terror to their location. They find Hiccup and fend off the hunters leading the imprisoned dragons to freedom, while the Triple Stryke, having been in captivity for so long, decides to go with the riders, who name him "Sleuther," back to the Edge.
75	9	"Tone Death"	Robert Briggs	Art Brown & Douglas Sloan	June 24, 2016
The Dragon Riders find themselves in over their heads when they save an egg from the Hunters that hatches into a baby Death Song and won't stop crying. With Heather's help, they discover they can train the baby, named "Garffiljorg," by singing it songs, but Garffiljorg still continues to cry. Heather refuses to abandon the baby dragon, convincing the riders to leave it on Melody Island to be cared for by the elder Death Song. The Death Song rejects Garffiljorg when it sings the songs taught to it by the riders and imprisons them, but Garffiljorg returns to protect them by singing the Death Song's native cry. The dragons bond and fly away, allowing the riders to return home.
76	10	"Between a Rock and a Hard Place"	T.J. Sullivan	FM De Marco	June 24, 2016
The riders ambush a hunter convoy only to find it loaded with marble blocks and split into teams to investigate. Hiccup, Fishlegs, and the twins comes across a marble mining operation on a nearby island using enslaved Catastrophic Quakens. While Fishlegs is determined to save them, Hiccup fears it may already be too late. Meanwhile, Astrid, Heather, and Snotlout find the marble is being used to construct a dragon-proof fortress that will make it impossible for any captured dragons to escape. Fishlegs manages to free the Quakens just as their poundings cause the island to sink and have them destroy the Hunters' stone base. The riders fear how many other slave dragons the hunters have while Viggo assures the riders will pay.
77	11	"Family on the Edge"	David M.V. Jones	Jack Thomas	June 24, 2016
Hiccup and the riders are preparing an attack on a hunter shipyard when Dagur appears, asking for Hiccup's help to find Heather. Though still doubtful, Hiccup and the others scramble to keep the siblings from noticing each other by sending Heather away while offering Dagur a Gronckle he names Shattermaster to get him to leave, but they cross paths anyway. Dagur, despite his pleas that he is trying to change, is imprisoned once he sees the riders' plans and warns Hiccup that the shipyard is a trap. The riders, Heather in particular, refuse to listen and head in anyway, leading to Dagur to escape to carry out their attack solo to prove it was a trap, and sacrifice himself to allow the riders to escape. Back at the Edge, Heather finds a note from Dagur telling the truth about their father, leaving Heather to mourn in silence.
78	12	"Last Auction Heroes"	David M.V. Jones	Jack Thomas	June 24, 2016
With Dagur's information and a map of the location stolen by Johann, the riders send Snotlout and Gobber undercover with Berk's reluctantly lent gold to the hunters' latest dragon auction to rescue the dragons and cripple Viggo's business. Johann smuggles in the other riders with his ship, but though they infiltrate successfully, they are discovered and imprisoned in the caverns while their dragons are put on auction, beginning with Toothless. The riders escape with the help of the disposal Hotburple named Grump who Gobber bonds with and send the hunters running. Though Viggo manages to get away with Berk's gold, the dragons are still rescued, which Gobber assures Hiccup counts for something.
79	13	"Defenders of the Wing, Part 1"	David M.V. Jones	Jack Thomas	June 24, 2016
As the riders continuously sabotage the hunters' business, Viggo offers Hiccup a truce, dividing the archipelago in half to prevent further war between them. While looking it over, the riders believe Viggo is keeping them from something on a nearby island. They investigate only to be imprisoned by a dragon-worshiping tribe called the Defenders of the Wing, led by Queen Mala, who believes them to be hunters for their subjugation of dragons. Hiccup allows himself to stand trial and face their punishments, seeing Mala and her tribe as potential allies in their struggles against the hunters and eventually wins her trust. They learn the tribe is guarded by a lava-eating dragon, the Eruptodon, whom Mala and the others label 'The Great Protector,' but Hiccup soon realizes when the Eruptodon is captured that Viggo was using them as a distraction. Believing them to have been in league with the Hunters all along, Mala swears to kill Hiccup herself.

=== Season 6 (2017) ===
No. overall	No. in season	Title	Directed by	Written by	Original release date
80	1	"Defenders of the Wing, Part 2"	Robert Briggs	John Tellegen	February 17, 2017
Mala and her Dragon Worshippers have the riders at sword point, but Hiccup proposes a ceasefire and convinces Mala to trust them as they set out to retrieve the Eruptodon while Heather and the twins help stop the lava flow. The riders learn from Mala, who joins them, that Viggo plans to use the starving Eruptodon to destroy Dragon's Edge by eating at its dormant volcano. Though the Hunters take the island, the riders manage to drive them off with the help of Mala and the Gronkles living on the Edge are recruited to safely return the Eruptodon home. Mala is finally convinced that the riders are allies of the dragons and the two groups align to defeat the hunters for good.
81	2	"Gruff Around the Edges"	T.J. Sullivan	Jack Thomas	February 17, 2017
The twins' world travelling cousin Gruffnut comes to the Edge to pay a visit and Tuffnut is overjoyed to see his longtime hero. Ruffnut, however, is suspicious of Gruffnut's intentions, especially when he tries to fly off with each of the riders' dragons. Gruffnut is revealed to owe money to the Hunters and promised one of the riders' dragons to pay off his debt. When Tuffnut learns of the deception, Gruffnut switches their clothes and takes his place, trying to secretly bring Barf and Belch to the Hunters. Ruffnut recognizes him and Tuffnut defeats him in battle. They rescue Gruffnut anyway due to his being "family," and leaves him in a Quaken's cave where he can have "a real adventure."
82	3	"Midnight Scrum"	T.J. Sullivan	John Tellegen	February 17, 2017
The riders attend Berk's 400 year anniversary, but there is little chance for celebration when they learn Viggo has placed a bounty on Hiccup's head. Hiccup is captured by everyone from two dim-witted brothers to Savage to the masked man from Viggo's auction, leading the riders and Stoick on a wild goose chase to find him. When Ryker reveals there is no payment, Hiccup manages to escape while the riders arrive and defeat the hunters. Stoick threatens Ryker to tell Viggo to call off the bounty and the masked man, seeing no chance to take Hiccup to Viggo himself, escapes. Hiccup and Stoick admit their fault in taking on their burdens alone and promise to confide in each other as allies as well as family.
83	4	"Not Lout"	John Sanford	John Tellegen	February 17, 2017
Spitelout gives Snotlout bad advice at the official opening of the Jorgenson storehouse, convincing Snotlout that the others are constantly badmouthing him behind his back. Out of increasing paranoia, Snotlout begins to make reckless decisions that put the other riders in danger and at odds with him when he attempts to develop himself as a worthy leader only to crack under the pressure. When the riders go on a mission to destroy the hunters' increased supply of Dragon Root, Snotlout at first refuses to go, but returns to save the riders when he discovers the trap that has been set. Snotlout is reassured that he will be great, but he will follow his own path instead of his father's.
84	5	"Saving Shattermaster"	Robert Briggs	Art Brown & Douglas Sloan	February 17, 2017
While investigating a trading post, Hiccup and Heather are shocked to see Dagur alive and appearing to be aligned with the Hunters. They learn that Dagur has been working undercover trying to save Shattermaster from the Hunters, convincing the two to help him save his dragon and other captured Gronkles. Dagur leads Viggo's fleet away and swears to Heather that he will return to answer her questions, leaving his worried sister behind. Meanwhile, Snotlout, as a result of his saving Mala's life from the Hunters, undergoes The Trials, a series of tests to prove himself as King of the Defenders of the Wing. He manages to pass two life-threatening trials but fails in the third, though Mala commends his effort and makes him a guest of honor in a celebratory feast.
85	6	"Dire Straits"	Gil Zimmerman	FM De Marco	February 17, 2017
To deal with the riders' growing resistance, Viggo captures the Submaripper, an extremely powerful and territorial Tidal-class Dragon, to create man-eating whirlpools to block all trade routes and leave Berk to wither away in starvation. Hiccup develops a diving bell to dive underwater and Changewing acid to dissolve the chains, but the Hunters' interruption wakes the sleeping Submaripper. Hiccup still manages to free the Submaripper, and it rescues him just as the bell shatters, leaving Ryker to take a desperate Viggo away just as the other riders close in. Though Hiccup feels guilty for driving Viggo to make such a move, Stoick expresses confidence that he and the others will always be able to stop him.
86	7	"The Longest Day"	Robert Briggs	Jack Thomas	February 17, 2017
It is now the time of Midnight sun – straight daylight for two weeks – and the riders and people of Berk have begun to show random and hilarious symptoms of sleep deprivation; including Astrid being deliriously happy, Heather lacking coordination, Fishlegs being paranoid, Snotlout having random mood swings, and the twins hallucinating. Hiccup wants to take the chance to enact revenge on Viggo for his underhanded attack on Berk without a plan but is caught up investigating and surviving the aggression of a small pack of new dragons and their leader that have driven the Hunters from their observation post. Thanks to Toothless, Hiccup develops a plan to divide and trap the newly christened 'Shadow Wings' one by one, reminding him of the importance of teamwork and strategy, and returns to Dragon's Edge to join the riders in a well-deserved nap in the Edge's darkened basement levels.
87	8	"Gold Rush"	T.J. Sullivan	John Tellegen	February 17, 2017
Dagur returns to the Edge claiming to know the location of Viggo's gold stores, and joins the riders on a mission to take back Berk's stolen gold. The rush of events leaves Heather torn between her loyalties to the riders and wanting to join her brother on his current journey to find their missing father Oswald the Agreeable and rebuild the Berserker Tribe. The island where the gold is stored turns out to be empty save for strange looking ruins, and the others are captured by Viggo while searching. Heather, Fishlegs, and Dagur face difficulty saving them due to Viggo's dragon-proof ships until Heather and Dagur work together to take down the fleet. The riders return to the island and reclaim the hidden gold, and Heather finally decides to go with Dagur to find her father.
88	9	"Out of the Frying Pan"	Gil Zimmerman	FM De Marco	February 17, 2017
The Defenders of the Wing contact the riders for their aid in delivering an Eruptodon egg to the nesting site inside their island's volcano to hatch before it hardens to stone. Hiccup and Fishlegs face continuous difficulties working together to deliver the egg, and things are made worse when a pack of wild Fire Terrors inhabiting the cave kidnap the egg. Mala attempts to retrieve the egg herself, but Hiccup and Fishlegs regain their synergy and realize the Fire Terrors are there to safely bring the egg to the nesting ground without human interference. The three trust the Fire Terrors to take the Eruptodon egg and it safely reaches the nesting ground where it is bathed in the lava.
89	10	"Twintuition"	Gil Zimmerman	Will Morey	February 17, 2017
Tuffnut breaks his beloved mace, called "Macey", trying to break the Hunters' newest chains, and the twins go to the Hunter-swarmed Northern Markets to fix it. Using their "twintuition", the twins follow the repaired and stolen Macey to find a hidden hunter operation called "Project Shellfire". Tuffnut, who deeply cares for his mace, tries to take it back on his own, while Ruffnut is captured by Viggo and Ryker to be used as bait for a trap for the others. Tuffnut learns to put the needs of the team before his own and saves the others by sacrificing his Macey and freeing the others. The twins hold a funeral for Macey back on the Edge, where Tuffnut reveals stolen schematics that leave the riders worried for what "Project Shellfire" entails.
90	11	"Blindsided"	T.J. Sullivan	Art Brown & Douglas Sloan	February 17, 2017
A freak lightning storm hits the Edge and while trying to rescue the dragons from the pens, Astrid looks into a stray bolt and ends up blinded. She joins the riders in searching for the dragons who were scared off by the storm, but her stubborn and fiery attitude makes things tough when they run into the aggressive and still untrained Triple Stryke. Fearing the possibility her condition may be permanent and her Dragon Rider days are over, Astrid still manages to use her other senses to figure out the Triple Stryke's weakness and finally train it. Astrid regains her sight thanks to Gothi, and she and Hiccup enjoy a perfect moment together, finally beginning their relationship.
91	12	"Shell Shocked, Part 1"	Robert Briggs	Art Brown & Douglas Sloan	February 17, 2017
After months of planning, Hiccup has come up with a fool-proof plan to defeat Viggo once and for all and finally reclaim the Dragon Eye. The riders and their allies storm his base, only to find it in ruins along with an injured Viggo. He reveals that Ryker has taken charge of the Hunters, including 'Project Shellfire', and offers to surrender the Dragon Eye in return for Hiccup's help in stopping Ryker. Viggo escapes during an attack on the Defenders of the Wing, leaving the riders with the baby Eruptodon in their care. When the riders find Ryker, he tells them that Viggo is setting them up and he can give them the Dragon Eye as the Berserkers are attacked by the Shell Fire, a giant Tidal class dragon equipped with Hunter weaponry. Just as Hiccup is left without any ideas on what to do, whom to trust, or even how to handle his developing feelings for Astrid in the midst of growing danger, Viggo returns and offers the Dragon Eye as proof of his word and offers an equal alliance to bring Ryker down.
92	13	"Shell Shocked, Part 2"	Gil Zimmerman	Art Brown & Douglas Sloan	February 17, 2017
Even with the Eye returned, Hiccup and the others still refuse to trust Viggo and imprison him just as Ryker arrives with the Hunters' fleet. The riders find out the Hunters are forcing the Shell Fire to attack but are unable to get close as the attacks trigger the Edge's volcano. Hiccup rescues Viggo from his burning cell and agrees to work together to stop Ryker by using the Submaripper, the Shell Fire's natural enemy, to destroy the fleet while the Defenders' baby Eruptodon helps control the volcano's lava flow. The Shell Fire is freed and Ryker is consumed with the fleet by the Submaripper. Viggo turns on Hiccup, threatening to kill Astrid in exchange for the Dragon Eye, but Hiccup throws the Eye into the volcano and Viggo rushes to the edge chasing after it. The edge of the volcano then collapses and Viggo falls to his apparent death. Hiccup and Astrid realize their relationship compromises their mission and promise to remain professional as the other riders finally learn their secret, cementing their relationship. However, just as they leave to check the island, the volcano erupts.

=== Season 7 (2017) ===
No. overall	No. in season	Title	Directed by	Written by	Original release date
93	1	"Living on the Edge"	Greg Rankin	Art Brown & Douglas Sloan	August 25, 2017
Dragon's Edge has been beset by small eruptions in the month following the Riders' victory over the Hunters, and with nothing left for them in the outlying islands, the Riders are forced to make the heavy decision to return to Berk. Hiccup and Fishlegs develop a mixture of Deathsong amber and Gronkle Iron to stop the lava bursts, but while gathering materials, Hiccup and Astrid discover an older Garff mortally wounded, hinting that the Hunters, who are now led by the masked man who tried to abduct Hiccup and has the ability to control dragons, are continuing activity. Working together with the Gronkles and Quakens of Dark Deep, the Riders manage to stabilize the volcano, and decide to hold off on returning home to stop the Hunters once and for all.
94	2	"Sandbusted"	T.J. Sullivan	Art Brown & Douglas Sloan	August 25, 2017
Astrid faces difficulty choosing a betrothal gift for Hiccup when word from Johann comes in that traders are disappearing from the Northern Markets. Fishlegs believes it to be related to "The Curse of Tears", and when Hiccup's own betrothal gift for Astrid is stolen, he and Snotlout discover it to be real when they and the thief are pulled under the sands by a treasure-hoarding dragon which they call a Sandbuster, and are forced to work together to survive its wrath. Guided by a map to the "Treasure of Tears", Astrid and the others manage to rescue the three and Hiccup gives his gift to her, a pendant that Stoick had given to Hiccup's mother. But their moment is spoiled when they discover Snotlout recovered Viggo's sword from the Sandbuster's lair.
95	3	"Something Rotten on Berserker Island"	Robert Briggs	Art Brown & Douglas Sloan	August 25, 2017
The Riders are invited to Berserker Island where, to their shock and Snotlout's indignance, Dagur has made Gustav a Berserker apprentice. Just as they are about to celebrate his graduation, Savage and a faction of Berserkers start a revolt and imprison Dagur and the dragons. Snotlout and Gustav work together to free Dagur, but bit by bit under the gravity of the situation and Snotlout's pressure, Gustav's confidence wanes until he admits his cheating while under Dagur's tutelage. The riders and Berserker siblings battle, and despite Savage capturing Heather, still manage to defeat him, and Dagur, admitting Gustav's apprenticeship was faked to relieve Berk of him for a while, honors Snotlout with a Berserker trophy, though he purposefully gets his name wrong.
96	4	"Snotlout's Angels"	David Jones & Abe Brown	Art Brown & Douglas Sloan	August 25, 2017
Snotlout's typical repulsive attitude forces him to flee the Edge after angering Astrid, and after being caught in a storm is saved by an Amazonian tribe called the Wingmaidens, who plan on making him a part of their sacred stew out of their intolerance towards men. Astrid, Ruffnut, and Heather infiltrate the island to save him, but in the process learn of the Wingmaiden Tribe's purpose and Windshear's origins in that they raise infant Razorwhips to protect them from being eaten by the males. Snotlout in turn is nearly killed by the aggressive female Razorwhips, but is saved by the Riders and Wingmaidens who in the end celebrate their newly formed alliance, and Snotlout learns a lesson in etiquette.
97	5	"A Matter of Perspective"	Greg Rankin	Art Brown & Douglas Sloan	August 25, 2017
Now too aged to fulfilled its duties, the Defenders' Eruptodon passes its mantle of Great Protector to its child and leaves for Vanaheim, the final resting place of dragons that no human has ever seen. The twins disobey Hiccup's orders and follow the Eruptodon to Vanaheim to complete their Viking travel guide, leaving all the Riders stranded on the island and unable to leave thanks to the Sentinel dragons guarding it, which have developed a counter-defense for every dragon. Using Mala's advice to look at things differently, Hiccup learns to use the Sentinel's behavior and abilities to his advantage and with help from the Eruptodon, manage to escape, and Hiccup destroys Tuffnut's guide to ensure that no other human will discover Vanaheim.
98	6	"Return of Thor Bonecrusher"	T.J. Sullivan	Art Brown & Douglas Sloan	August 25, 2017
A pair of Outcasts travel to the Edge asking for the aid of Thor Bonecrusher, Fishlegs' alter ego, to rescue Alvin the Treacherous from a band of bandits seeking large amounts of Ice Tail Pike fish for the Hunters. Fishlegs allows Snotlout to hypnotize him into Thor once more, but their precaution of making Thor more "anti-heroic" backfires when Thor ends up taking charge of the bandits, making them much more formidable. Snotlout manages to undo the hypnosis, but Fishlegs pretends to be Thor long enough for the other Riders to swoop in and rescue them and Alvin. Meanwhile, the Hunters, now co-led by the masked man Krogan and a still-living Viggo, make preparations for their next move.
99	7	"Dawn of Destruction"	Robert Briggs & Abe Brown	Art Brown & Douglas Sloan	August 25, 2017
Hiccup and Astrid leave together on a supply run against strong protest from the other Riders. In their absence, the Edge is attacked by a group of Singetails, which the others discover are being ridden by the Hunters and led by Krogan and his Titan Wing Singetail. Even Hiccup and Astrid's return does nothing to even the odds and things become worse when Fishlegs is separated from the group, though he manages to return with help from his old friend Darkvarg. In the end, the group is forced to abandon Dragon's Edge and seek shelter with the Defenders of the Wing, where Hiccup resolves to regain the others' trust after it is revealed he is building a new Dragon Eye, while Viggo attempts to reclaim the original one from the Edge's volcano.
100	8	"The Wings of War, Part 1"	Greg Rankin	Art Brown & Douglas Sloan	August 25, 2017
The Dragon Flyers attack the Defenders of the Wing, forcing Hiccup and the other Riders to lead them away. They are chased from island after island before retreating into the fog bank on the Archipelago's border. The Riders return to Berk, where Stoick prepares the island for war. Hiccup refuses to harm the Flyer's Singetail dragons, while his father and Astrid tell him they may not have a choice. He flies alone with Toothless to the abandoned Storehouse Island to learn more about Singetails to find another way to fight them, but gets pinned down by one. Meanwhile, Viggo searches the Edge's volcano for the missing Dragon Eye.
101	9	"The Wings of War, Part 2"	T.J. Sullivan	Art Brown & Douglas Sloan	August 25, 2017
Hiccup ends up being rescued by Spitelout, who has been staying on Storehouse Island for months plotting to capture a Singetail for revenge on their attack before. With Spitelout's help, Hiccup discovers weaknesses in the Singetails' behavior while the Riders, Stoick, the A-Team, and the Berk fleets launch a preemptive strike on Dragons' Edge where the Hunters are. The Berk forces are quickly put on the defensive and Krogan takes the chance to launch all his Dragon Flyers against them, which ultimately leaves them defenseless when Hiccup returns to turn the tide. The Riders finally reclaim the Edge, but Astrid discovers Viggo is still alive and has recovered the Dragon Eye. However Hiccup is prepared as his new Dragon Eye is nearing completion.
102	10	"No Dragon Left Behind"	Greg Rankin	Art Brown & Douglas Sloan	August 25, 2017
Garff's predatory instincts begin to emerge as the Riders are in the middle of repairs, convincing them that now may be a good time to find him a new home. Fishlegs believes he has found the perfect candidate, but it turns out to be home to Slitherwings, venomous serpentine dragons that poison Stormfly as she defends Garff to trigger strange wild behavior. Though Astrid is poisoned herself to gather the venom needed for the antidote, it proves ineffective on Stormfly, which turns out to be due to her never being poisoned and instead is grieving over the loss of Garff. The Deathsong is soon revealed to be alive and gains the chance to escape with the Riders thanks to Stormfly's new blinding light shot, and the Riders find him a more suitable home.
103	11	"Snuffnut"	T.J. Sullivan	Art Brown & Douglas Sloan	August 25, 2017
Throk comes to the Edge with the life debt he owes Ruffnut from the battle with the Flyers having turned more romantic, but Fishlegs steps in when he shows his courting ways to be outdated. Feeling he may be denying his sister a chance at lifelong happiness, Tuffnut uses a visiting Changewing on migration to fake his death and allow Ruffnut to go with Throk, but Ruffnut refuses to move on by painting her brother's image on the belly of a Changewing she names Snuffnut and Throk refuses to leave without her and attempts to tame Snuffnut on his own. Eventually, the Riders save Throk, Tuffnut reveals his lie, and the Changewings are diverted away, and Throk decides to leave understanding that the Thorston twins are better together.
104	12	"Searching for Oswald ... and Chicken"	Robert Briggs	Laura Bowes	August 25, 2017
The Berserker siblings continue the search for their father and though each failure only spurs Heather's obsession, Dagur is worried the search will lead to her doom. He asks for Hiccup's help in deciphering Oswald's diary, which contains a picture of a massive dragon skull that leads them back to Vanaheim. Meanwhile the twins, Snotlout and Astrid search for Chicken, who has gone missing, and find she has started a new family with a wild rooster. The search for Oswald ends on an unhappy a note, with Dagur only finding his remains and a last message to him, saying that he loved his son, and explaining his life on the island. Oswald also left a letter for Heather. Though Dagur is heartbroken upon learning about his father's death, he continues his father's work by helping the Sentinels defend Vanaheim from the rogue Grim Gnasher dragons, and leaves satisfied that his father passed proud.
105	13	"Sins of the Past"	Greg Rankin	Art Brown & Douglas Sloan	August 25, 2017
Heather and Johann travel to the Northern Markets when the latter finds word of a man who has claimed to have seen Oswald the Agreeable alive. This, however, turns out to be a trap by Krogan and the Hunters, who capture Windshear and demand the gem on Heather's belt, a lens for the Dragon Eye, in exchange for her life. Johann convinces Heather to go through with the trade and though Krogan attempts to double cross her with a fake key, they are saved by Hiccup, the Riders and Dagur, who finally reveals the truth of Oswald's fate and grants her closure. Meanwhile, Krogan and Viggo obtain the lens, setting the true mastermind behind the Hunters, Johann, one step closer to finding the King of Dragons.

=== Season 8 (2018) ===
No. overall	No. in season	Title	Directed by	Written by	Original release date
106	1	"In Plain Sight"	T.J. Sullivan	Jack Thomas	February 16, 2018
In order to complete the Dragon Eye and discover the location of the King of Dragons, Johann needs more lenses while Hiccup still needs gemstones to complete his Dragon Eye 2. Continuing his ruse as their ally, Johann suggests taking a trip to the Northern Market with Hiccup alone and that he brings both his Dragon Eye 2 and all of his lenses. Despite Johann's attempts, Ruffnut and Tuffnut insist on accompanying them. During the trip, they are ambushed by hunters, but the twins rescue Hiccup and Johann and deduce that the only way the hunters knew they'd be there is if there was a mole within their group. Johann is able to distract the twins and lead Hiccup to the Sandbuster's lair, where he reveals his deception and demands that Hiccup hand over the lenses. However, Hiccup had already deduced Johann was the mole thanks to the twins, and is able to escape thanks to Toothless. The Dragon Eye 2 is completed, and the riders discover that whoever recovers the five lenses first will reveal the location of the King of Dragons.
107	2	"No Bark, All Bite"	Robert Briggs	Ian Ricket	February 16, 2018
Angered at the revelation of Johann's betrayal, Stoick destroys everything from Johann's last shipments, including food and medicine. Despite Gobber and Hiccup's insistence, he is unwilling to trust any new traders that come to Berk. Hiccup and Stoick leave Berk to gather willowbark for medicine with tensions steadily flaring between them, but they discover that each island they go to is on fire and its willowbark destroyed. They realize that they are being sent on a wild goose chase and their absence leaves Berk vulnerable to an attack by Krogan, who proceeds to take over Berk with his Flyers. By working together, Stoick and Hiccup are able to free the Riders and their dragons and repel Krogan's invasion.
108	3	"Chain of Command"	Greg Rankin	Will Morey	February 16, 2018
The Riders host a meeting on Defenders of the Wing Island to discuss the threat Johann poses. However, Dagur and Mala constantly disagree with each other's ideas. Through Ruffnut and Tuffnut's mediation, Dagur and Mala actually get along and develop a mutual attraction for one another. Meanwhile, Hiccup and Snotlout travel to Wingmaiden Island to escort Atali to the meeting, where Atali leaves her second-in-command, Minden, in charge of the island, though Minden is upset at not being allowed to attend the meeting as well. When a fire breaks out on the other side of the island, Minden orders all the guards to put it out, leaving the Wingmaidens defenceless to a surprise attack from the Flyers, resulting in Atali being injured and knocked out. Feeling guilty over her mistake, Minden, with Snotlout's aid, recovers the hidden Dragon Eye lens on their island, which the Flyers have come for. After her repeated failures, Minden loses hope and confidence in herself and quits being a Wingmaiden, but is inspired by Snotlout not to give up. Using the baby Razorwhips, the Wingmaidens defeat the Dragon Flyers.
109	4	"Loyal Order of Ingerman"	T.J. Sullivan	John Tellegen	February 16, 2018
After learning his ancestors were dragon hunters who killed off the Dramillion dragons, Fishlegs sets out to Dramillion Island with Astrid (against Hiccups wishes) to find and help protect the Dramillions from harm. Before setting out, he remembers his dragon scouts are coming and leaves the twins to look after them. After arriving, he immediately finds one and tries to train but discovers it is very aggressive and has the unusual ability to mimic the fire blasts of other dragons, such as a Gronkle's lava blast and the Nadder's magnesium fire breath. While searching the island for more, they discover a group of hunters, who are following the teachings of his ancestor, Ingard Ingerman in trapping Dramillions and using them to help train new recruits. When the hunt begins, Fishlegs and Astrid combine Meatlug and Stormfly's fire to destroy the shackle that grounds the Dramillion. Though they realize that they won't have enough time to save them all, the Dramillions learn the technique to destroy the shackles themselves and are able to free each other. While this is happening the twins and Snotlout teach the scouts some of their 'ways' and lose track of them.
110	5	"A Gruff Separation"	Abe Brown	Will Morey	February 16, 2018
Gruffnut returns to the Edge, insisting that he has changed and is there to run Ruffnut and Tuffnut through the Thorston coming-of-age family trials that will allow them to fully join the family. However, he states that they must compete against each other, as only one can prevail, so they both decide not to compete but Gruffnut convinces them to compete. The first challenge is to collect Speed Stinger venom. Ruffnut is victorious but Tuffnut gets paralysed. The second is to grab 1 moulted Changewing skin. They both appear victorious. The last one is to grab a chest in a series of tunnels that also is a Titanwing Zippleback nest. Ruffnut manages to get the chest while Tuffnut is dragged off by a Zippleback. Ruffnut decides to save Tuffnut instead of completing the final challenge, which Gruffnut reveals was the secret, fourth challenge: putting family above everything else. When he leaves with a seemingly empty chest, the twins' cousin Agnut, reveals that she is there to commence the induction trials (which the twins believe they had already completed with Gruffnut's overlooking said family trials). She reveals that Gruffnut is not a Thorston because he never completed the family trials. On board Gruffnut's ship traveling back to Berk, the chest secretly contains a Dragon Eye lens, though Gruffnut remains ignorant to its significance.
111	6	"Mi Amore Wing"	Greg Rankin	John Tellegen	February 16, 2018
While everyone is wondering what to do with loads of scrap metal, Dagur and Mala arrive on the Edge to announce that Dagur has completed Mala's king trials and are to be wed. After hearing this, Astrid starts to think that Hiccup isn't interested in her anymore since they are not as publicly affectionate as Dagur and Mala and begins to question her relationship with him. After deciding that the Armorwing will make the best use of their spare scrap metal, Hiccup, Astrid (wearing Hiccup's Betrothal necklace), Snotlout, Fishlegs and Dagur go to the island to find the dragon. After landing, Dagur asks Hiccup to be his best man at the wedding while Astrid becomes annoyed that Hiccup hasn't noticed her wearing his betrothal necklace. After the Armorwing appears, Hiccup notices a Dragon Eye lens on its back. Krogan and his Flyers arrive to take the lens, and succeed after the Riders choose to instead evacuate the injured Armorwing rather than pursue Krogan. Astrid apologizes to Hiccup for her anger and behavior, and the pair reconcile.
112	7	"Ruff Transition"	Abe Brown	John Tellegen	February 16, 2018
While visiting Wingmaiden Island, the Riders get to witness the ceremony where newly hatched baby Razorwhips choose their Wingmaidens. One baby ends up choosing Ruffnut, whom Atali insists must become a Wingmaiden. Though Ruffnut struggles with the tasks to care for her Razorwhip, named Wingnut, she only succeeds thanks to Tuffnut's secret assistance. Despite Atali's encouragement, Ruffnut is certain that she cannot be a Wingmaiden and that Wingnut is better off without her. When Flyers attack, Ruffnut rescues Wingnut and uses her newly learned Wingmaiden abilities to help repel the Flyers' attack. Seemingly accepting that Ruffnut's place is with the Riders, Wingnut accepts Atali as its new Wingmaiden and caretaker.
113	8	"Triple Cross"	Robert Briggs	Will Morey	February 16, 2018
After Johann believes he has found the location of a Dragon Eye lens in a cave, he sends Viggo in to find it. While down there, Johann and Krogan decide that Viggo is no longer useful and collapse the cave entrance leaving him trapped with a Monstrous Nightmare. Later, Hiccup receives a Terror Mail supposedly from Stoick saying that he has found a Dragon Eye lens and to meet him alone. When he arrives, he realizes that Viggo is the one who sent the message and Viggo tells the story of his betrayal and asks for Hiccup's help. Hiccup refuses, but Viggo reveals that he has poisoned Toothless with Red Oleander, and that Toothless will die in three days if they do not recover an antidote from Johann. Using a Skrill as a diversion, Hiccup and Viggo enter their headquarters where Viggo betrays Hiccup to earn favor with Johann and Krogan once more. However, this is all part of their plan and Hiccup and Toothless escape their cell and rendezvous in Johann's Quarters, only to discover that Johann had moved the Dragon Eye to another location. Johann and Krogan realize Viggo's deception and a fight ensues, resulting in Viggo sustaining lethal injuries before rescuing the Skrill and reuniting with Hiccup. Viggo reveals that Red Oleander is not harmful to dragons and that he had no intention of poisoning Toothless, having developed a deep respect for dragons after a Monstrous Nightmare saved him from the cave in. He stays behind to fight off Johann's men with the Skrill to give Hiccup and Toothless time to escape, sacrificing his own life.
114	9	"Family Matters"	T.J. Sullivan	Jack Thomas	February 16, 2018
After a battle with the Flyers, the Riders discover remnants of Deathsong amber underneath a Singetail's wing, leading them to deduce that Krogan is using a Deathsong to lure and capture Singetails for his Flyers. Worried, the Riders quickly check on Garffiljorg while the others take the injured Singetail back to the Edge for recovery. They discover Garff safe and unharmed, but decide that they must liberate the Deathsong and cut off Krogan's supply of Singetails. Despite Hiccup's orders, Astrid allows Garff to accompany them back to the Edge and to rescue Krogan's Deathsong. Seeing their fortification, they decide to return with reinforcements, but Garff flies in to help the Deathsong upon hearing its cries, resulting in his capture. Meanwhile, the wounded Singetail wakes up on the Edge and despite Fishlegs' attempts to care for it, it escapes and Fishlegs and Meatlug follow it. After making a plan, they release the captive Singetails only to find the dragons turning on them and forcing the riders to fall back in a cave with no escape. While following the wounded Singetail to the same island, Fishlegs find a hatchery of Singetail eggs and realizes that the Flyers are breeding Singetails. In the cave, Hiccups finds Garff while Fishlegs brings the Cavern Crasher to help dig a new exit and move the Singetail eggs to safety. Once out of the cave, the Riders destroy the Flyers' facilities and free the Singetails.
115	10	"Darkest Night"	Greg Rankin	Art Brown & Douglas Sloan	February 16, 2018
Stoick is attacked in one of his routine border checks. He is rescued by the A team but is left in a comatose state as a result of his injuries. Hiccup is pressured to take up the temporary role of being chief in Stoick's absence, but Hiccup blames himself, believing that if he had never shot down Toothless in the first place, his father never would have been injured. Going from this, the others begin theorizing how different their lives and Berk would be had things gone differently. Later, an injured Heather and Windshear return from Vanaheim with dire news.
116	11	"Guardians of Vanaheim"	Robert Briggs	Art Brown & Douglas Sloan	February 16, 2018
Learning that several Flyers have followed her to Vanaheim, Heather arrives on Berk and informs the Riders. Hiccup, still worried about his father, is reluctant to leave Stoick alone and go to Vanaheim. Stoick momentarily wakes up to help him make the right choice. Before leaving, Alvin arrives with reinforcements to help keep Berk safe while Stoick is recovering. After arriving, they find the Sentinels seemingly dead and interrogate a remaining Flyer, who reveals the rest of the Flyers are on their way to inform Johann of Vanaheim's location. Hiccup, Astrid and Snotlout pursue the Flyers, but are forced to retreat into a ship and devise a plan. Using a supply of bolas from the ship, they lure the Flyers into a storm, causing the Flyers to be struck by lightning. Back on Vanaheim, Fishlegs looks through Oswald's hut for any information on the Sentinels and discovers they are not dead, but merely in a state of hibernation. Discovering that heat helps speed the hibernation process, Fishlegs and the twins use their dragons to restore the Sentinels while the twins end up finding a Dragon Eye lens while ransacking Oswald's hut. Johann also ends up attaining a fifth lens after capturing Gruffnut.
117	12	"King of Dragons, Part 1"	David M.V. Jones and T.J. Sullivan	Art Brown & Douglas Sloan	February 16, 2018
Hiccup and his team finally complete the Dragon Eye and finds the King of the Dragons is a Titan wing Dramillion on the Dramillion Island. But Johann and Krogan arrive first and capture the dragon. However, the dragon is abandoned in the waters and Hiccup's team rescues it and brings it to Queen Mala for recuperation. They question why Johann would simply abandon the King of Dragons, but discover that the flame of the Dramillion dragon shows a different picture through the Dragon Eye and reveals the true King of Dragons, a Bewilderbeast, in the Berserker Island.
118	13	"King of Dragons, Part 2"	David M.V. Jones	Art Brown & Douglas Sloan	February 16, 2018
Krogan and his men attack Berserker Island and are opposed by Hiccup's team and Wingmaidens. In spite of this, Johann's team finds the Bewilderbeast in the depths of the island with an egg. Hiccup faces Johann alone while Toothless defeats Krogan and recovers the egg. Before Johann can finish Hiccup, he is frozen by the Bewilderbeast. The trapped Bewilderbeast, with its ability to control other dragons, calls for help from all available dragons, among them are Garffiljorg, the Eruptodon, the Screaming Death, the Frozen Skrill, Thornado, Bing, Bam and Boom and every dragon the Riders ever encountered. The Riders and wild dragons defeat the hunters while the Bewilderbeast escapes. Krogan is captured and executed by his employer, Drago Bludvist, for his failure in acquiring the egg and Drago begins to seek out a new Bewilderbeast. Meanwhile, the Wingmaidens entrust the egg to Valka, Stoick recovers from his injuries, Mala and Dagur are married, Fishlegs and Snotlout both begin courting Ruffnut, Hiccup decides to destroy both Dragon Eyes to prevent them from falling into the wrong hands and the Riders leave the Edge to return to Berk.
