= Dawn of the Dragon Racers =

- DVD cover
- Directed by: Elaine Bogan; John Sanford
- Written by: Art Brown; Douglas Sloan
- Produced by: Chad Hammes
- Starring: Jay Baruchel; America Ferrera; Zack Pearlman; Christopher Mintz-Plasse; T.J. Miller; Andrée Vermeulen; Tim Conway; Chris Edgerly
- Edited by: John Laus
- Music by: John Paesano
- Production company: DreamWorks Animation
- Distributed by: 20th Century Fox Home Entertainment
- Release date: November 1, 2014
- Running time: 26 minutes
- Country: United States
- Language: English

Dawn of the Dragon Racers (also known as Dragons: Dawn of the Dragon Racers) is a 2014 animated short film by DreamWorks Animation and directed by Elaine Bogan and John Sanford. Based on the How to Train Your Dragon novel and film series, the short features the voices of Jay Baruchel and America Ferrera along with the cast from the television series.

The short film takes place three years before the events of the sequel, in between the events of Defenders of Berk and Race to the Edge. In the short, a hunt for a lost sheep turns into a competition between Hiccup and his friends for the first title of Dragon Racing Champion of Berk.

== Plot ==
Hiccup and his friends compete and practice catching sheep for the annual Dragon Race, the new and official dragon sport event on Berk. When Snotlout states that he created the sport, Hiccup and Astrid quickly deny that claim, saying that is not how they remember it, so they recall the events of how and who invented Dragon Racing.

Cutting to a flashback, when the Riders were still in their early teens, Berk is getting ready for the traditional annual Regatta which starts in a few days, when suddenly a herd of sheep run throughout the village, because Silent Sven broke his silence and they are afraid of his new voice. While in the process of catching the sheep, the Riders end up turning it in to an impromptu competition against each other in getting as many sheep as possible. Meanwhile, Stoick appoints Hiccup to oversee the preparations for the Regatta in his place before he leaves to get wood from Loki Island.

Meanwhile, at the Academy, Tuffnut is plotting out some rules for the Riders' sheep competition, but is interrupted as Hiccup arrives reluctantly prohibiting them to carry on with their plan as he has Stoick's strict orders to prepare for the Regatta. The next day, Hiccup discovers that the Riders have disobeyed his order and have carried on the sheep catching, although the villagers are enjoying it much more than the Regatta. Later, the villagers gather at the Great Hall, wanting to see the race again. Hiccup tries to regain their enthusiasm for the Regatta but is unsuccessful.

Inspired by the twins, the crowd wants another Dragon Race, and Hiccup reluctantly agrees. The dragon riders split into teams, Snotlout and the Twins teaming up, while Hiccup and Astrid then go to get Fishlegs, who declines joining the race as he is too busy getting ready for the Regatta, refusing to back down on his family tradition. The race starts, and both teams catch as many sheep as they can. Shortly thereafter, Astrid and Snotlout collide as neither of them were backing out trying to catch the Black Sheep, and this causes Astrid to injure her arm. Later, Hiccup announces that it is time to move on to the Regatta, but the villagers are unsatisfied and demand another Dragon Race. After being mocked by Snotlout, Hiccup decided to continue the race, and once again asks Fishlegs to join his team, but Fishlegs refuses as he is putting the finishing touches on his ship. Fishlegs slowly sails out to sea with Meatlug, but she quickly begins to feel sea sick and vomits lava, causing the ship to immediately sink, making Fishlegs change his mind about accepting the offer.

They both head off to the Academy where the competition is about to start. Just as the flag is about to be dropped, Stoick returns, and instead of punishing Hiccup for contradicting his order, Stoick allows him to proceed with the race, but only if they do it right. Stoick announces that each white sheep is worth one point, while the Black Sheep is worth five, and the winning team will have their portrait hung in the Great Hall, and a feast thrown in their honor. The race begins and the teams fly all over Berk catching the sheep and bringing them back to the Academy. When the teams are all tied up, they attempt to the Black Sheep, which will win them the race. While Hiccup and Fishlegs look for the Black Sheep in the well, the Twins fly by with another black sheep, which shocks Hiccup. Team Snotnuts win the race, but just as they are about to take their victory, Fishlegs arrives with the real Black Sheep, revealing that Team Snotnuts had cheated by painting a regular sheep with black paint. A reversal is announced by Astrid, swapping the victory from Team Snotnuts to Team Hiclegs, making them the first official champions in Dragon Racing.

Back to the present, Hiccup concludes that it was technically Tuffnut who invented Dragon Racing, because he was the one came up with the concepts of the rules, humiliating the three of them, especially Snotlout, but they decided to say that they all invented the sport. Suddenly, a horn blows, signalling that it is time for the Dragon Race and all the Riders quickly set off to start.

== Voice cast ==
- Jay Baruchel as Hiccup
- America Ferrera as Astrid
- Christopher Mintz-Plasse as Fishlegs
- T.J. Miller as Tuffnut
- Tim Conway as Mulch
- Chris Edgerly as Gobber
- Tom Kenny as Silent Sven
- Nolan North as Stoick
- Zack Pearlman as Snotlout
- Andrée Vermeulen as Ruffnut

== Home media ==
Dawn of the Dragon Racers was released on November 11, 2014 as a special feature on the DVD/Blu-ray/digital release of How to Train Your Dragon 2. It was released on DVD separately on March 3, 2015, with the previously released Book of Dragons and Legend of the Boneknapper Dragon included as well.
