= Chris Edgerly =

American voice actor

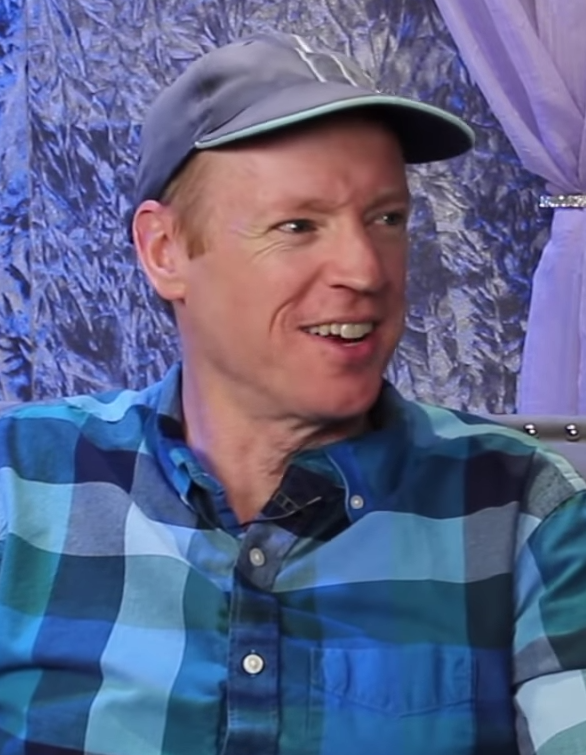
- Edgerly in 2018
- Occupations: Voice actor; comedian
- Years active: 1995–present
- Agent: Cunningham, Escott, Slevin, and Doherty
- Website: chrisedgerly.com

Chris Edgerly is an American voice actor.

== Life and career ==
Edgerly provided the voice of Peter Potamus on the Adult Swim animated series Harvey Birdman, Attorney at Law, in addition to several guest voices on the TV series Drawn Together. Other television voice appearances include Duck Dodgers, My Gym Partner's a Monkey, Codename: Kids Next Door, and Kenan & Kel. He can also be heard as the voice of "Cloak" in the Disney animated feature The Wild. In 2006, Edgerly started voicing Nick Diamond, The Masked Man and referee Mills Lane on the return of MTV's Celebrity Deathmatch. He also provided a voice for a Brute in the video game Halo 2 and Pathfinder in Apex Legends and appeared on two episodes of Kenan & Kel.

Edgerly lent his voice to Yuan, Magnius, and Kvar in the video game Tales of Symphonia. He has also voiced Cid Highwind in the film Final Fantasy VII Advent Children, as well as the video games Kingdom Hearts II, Lineage II, and Dirge of Cerberus: Final Fantasy VII; voiced The Flash in the 2006 video game Justice League Heroes; and voiced the character of Sullivan in Resonance of Fate.

He recently voiced Pathfinder in the game Apex Legends and has voiced various soldiers in the video game Valkyria Chronicles and TEL in Infinity Blade III. He voiced the protagonist character Ken Ogawa in FromSoftware's video game Ninja Blade. He also provided the voice of Gambit in the video game adaption of X-Men Origins: Wolverine as well as voicing different characters in the 2012 video game, Lego The Lord of the Rings. He also voiced Peter Parker, J. Jonah Jameson, and Spider-Man in The Amazing Adventures of Spider-Man. Additionally, he voices Hidan in Naruto: Shippuden. Edgerly played the voice of Jedi Master Eeth Koth for the animated series Star Wars: The Clone Wars in the second season episode "Grievous Intrigue".

In 2011, he became a cast member for The Simpsons playing various characters. He also voiced Ren Hoek in the 2011 game Nicktoons MLB. In 2013, Edgerly took the role of a spiky winged creature called a pufferthorn, and his character was named Pop Thorn, in Skylanders: Swap Force. Edgerly also has provided the voice of Gobber the Belch on Cartoon Network's DreamWorks Dragons animated series for seasons 1 and 2. He has continued to do so for its third season that aired on Netflix in 2015.

Edgerly was one of the two main voice actors in the English release of Top Cat: The Movie.

== Filmography ==
=== Animation ===
Year	Title	Role	Notes	Source
2002–2008	Codename: Kids Next Door	Additional voices		
2004–2006	Drawn Together	Snagglepuss, Elmer Fudd, Buckie Bucks, Board of Education, Doctor, Captain Colonicus	11 episodes	
2004–2007	Harvey Birdman, Attorney at Law	Peter Potamus, Augie Doggie, Captain Caveman, Yakky Doodle, Funky Phantom, Various	24 episodes	
2005	Duck Dodgers	Steve Botson	2 episodes	
2006	My Gym Partner's a Monkey	Superintendent Wolverine	Ep. "The Poop Scoop/Leaf of Absence"	
2006–07	Celebrity Deathmatch	Nick Diamond, The Masked Man, Mills Lane	16 episodes	
2008	Wolverine and the X-Men	Agent Haskett, Carl	3 episodes	
2010	Star Wars: The Clone Wars	Eeth Koth	Ep. "Grievous Intrigue"	
2011–present	The Simpsons	Animator, Mr. Waffle, Rod Flanders (since 2024), Various	173 episodes	
2012	Mad	Megatron, Shrek	Ep. "Outtagascar/Fiends"	
2012–18	DreamWorks Dragons	Gobber the Belch	31 episodes	
2014	Hot in Cleveland	Abraham Lincoln	Ep. "The Animated Episode"	
2014–17	Clarence	Manny Piffle, Rake Backburn, Dom Delmo, Nicolaus Copernicus, Additional voices	8 episodes	
2015–18	Sofia the First	Elfred, Babble	2 episodes	
2016	LEGO Frozen Northern Lights	Ski Patrol Officer #2	Ep. "Journey to the Lights"	
2017	Transformers: Robots in Disguise	Crustacion / Video Game voice	Ep. "Defrosted"	
2018	Harvey Birdman: Attorney General	Peter Potamus	TV special	
2019–21	The Tom and Jerry Show	Rolf, Rudy	Recurring	

=== Anime (English dub) ===
Year	Title	Role	Source
2001	Baki	Ryuko Yanagi	
2006	Digimon Data Squad	Additional Voices	
2007	Naruto Shippūden	Hidan	
2019	Ultraman	Yosuke Endo, others	
2021	Godzilla Singular Point	Additional Voices	

=== Film ===
Year	Title	Role	Notes	Source
2005	Final Fantasy VII: Advent Children	Cid Highwind	English dub	
2005	Chicken Little	Male Rabbit		
2006	The Wild	Cloak		
2006	Dr. Dolittle 3	Pig, LP the Horse, Diamond the Horse, Rattlesnake	Direct-to-video	
2006	Happy Feet	Elder Penguins, Humans, additional voices		
2007	TMNT	Additional voices		
2011	Top Cat: The Movie	Benny, Robot	English dub	
2012	The Outback	Boris		
2012	Back to the Sea	Clean Fish		
2014	Road to Ninja: Naruto the Movie	Hidan	English dub	
2014	Dawn of the Dragon Racers	Gobber	Short	
2015	Top Cat Begins	Benny		
2020	Playdate with Destiny	Phonics Frog	Short	
2022	Tom and Jerry: Cowboy Up!	August Critchley	Direct-to-video	
2022	When Billie Met Lisa	Band Member	Short	
2022	Welcome to the Club	Prince Charming, Disney princes	Short	
2023	Rogue Not Quite One		Short	
2024	May the 12th Be with You	Chewbacca, Eeyore	Short	
2024	The Most Wonderful Time of the Year	Santa Claus doll	Short	

=== Video games ===
Year	Title	Role	Source
2003	The Cat in the Hat	The Cat in the Hat	
2003	Maximo vs. Army of Zin	Grim, Bandit, Morgan's Guard	
2004	Tales of Symphonia	Kvar, Magnius, Yuan Ka-Fai	
2004	Medal of Honor: Pacific Assault	Additional voices	
2004	Jet Li: Rise to Honour	Additional voices	
2004	The Lord of the Rings: The Third Age	Elegost	
2004	The Polar Express	Additional voices	
2004	The Incredibles	Additional voices	
2004	Ground Control II: Operation Exodus	Captain Jacob Angelus, Unit Feedback	
2004	Terminator 3: The Redemption	Daniel, Driver, Policemen, Additional voices	
2004	Ty the Tasmanian Tiger 2: Bush Rescue	Bruce, Ranger Ken	
2004	Halo 2	Brute	
2004	Call of Duty: Finest Hour	Additional voices	
2004	EverQuest II	Additional voices	
2005	Shadow of Rome	Additional voices	
2005	SWAT 4	SWAT Officer Zack "Hollywood" Fields	
2005	Key of Heaven	Muzo	
2005	Project: Snowblind	Lt. Col. Kanazawa	
2005	The Punisher	Additional voices	
2005	SWAT 4: The Stetchkov Syndicate	SWAT Officer Zack "Hollywood" Fields	
2005	Scooby-Doo! Unmasked	10,000 Volt Ghost, Alvin Wiener, Guitar Ghoul, Jed, Juggling Clown, Ninja, Pterodactyl	
2005	Evil Dead: Regeneration	Male Deadite #5, Male Deadite #6, Necromancer, Sparky, Winged Deadite	
2005	Ty the Tasmanian Tiger 3: Night of the Quinkan	Bruce, Ranger Ken, Redback Jack	
2006	Kingdom Hearts II	Cid	
2006	Tom Clancy's Ghost Recon: Advanced Warfighter	Additional voices	
2006	Resistance: Fall of Man	Additional voices	
2006	Happy Feet	Elder Penguins, Humans	
2006	Pirates of the Caribbean: The Legend of Jack Sparrow	Madame Tang's Guard, Portuguese Captain, Portuguese Officer	
2006	Dirge of Cerberus: Final Fantasy VII	Cid Highwind (English Dub)	
2006	Final Fantasy XII	Havharo (English Dub)	
2006	Justice League Heroes	Flash	
2006	Baten Kaitos Origins	Elder Kamroh, Rodolfo	
2007	Rogue Galaxy	Izel, Ragnar, Tony	
2007	The Darkness	Chester Coleman, Melvin Caines, Silvio Leatherchest	
2007	Tom Clancy's Ghost Recon: Advanced Warfighter 2	Additional voices	
2007	Mass Effect	Captain Ventralis, Cole, Powell	
2007	Halo 3	Grunt	
2007	Armored Core 4	Berlioz, Sadhana, Eugene	
2007	Call of Duty 4: Modern Warfare	Marine Soldier #3, SAS Soldier, US Pilot	
2008	Harvey Birdman: Attorney at Law	Peter Potamus, Prison Guard #1, Treadmill Prisoner	
2008	Call of Duty: World at War – Final Fronts	Additional voices	
2008	Resistance 2	Additional voices	
2008	Valkyria Chronicles	Additional voices	
2008	Naruto Shippuden: Ultimate Ninja Heroes 3	Anbu, Hidan, Prisoner (English Dub)	
2008	The Incredible Hulk	Bi-Beast Bottomhead, Enclave Soldier, Stark Industries Hulkbuster	
2008	Lego Batman: The Videogame	Mad Hatter, Man-Bat	
2009	The Lord of the Rings: Conquest	Aragorn, Rohan Officer #2	
2009	inFamous	Pedestrian	
2009	Terminator Salvation	Resistance Soldiers	
2009	Transformers: Revenge of the Fallen	Additional voices	
2009	Ninja Blade	Ken Ogawa	
2009	Ratchet & Clank Future: A Crack in Time	Terachnoid #2	
2009	The Saboteur	Renard	
2009	The Godfather II	Additional voices	
2009	Dragon Age: Origins	Additional voices	
2009	Cars Race-O-Rama	Additional voices	
2009	X-Men Origins: Wolverine	Remy LeBeau/Gambit	
2009	G.I. Joe: The Rise of Cobra	Kamakura	
2009	Halo 3: ODST	Grunts	
2009	Assassin's Creed II	Additional voices	
2009	James Cameron's Avatar: The Game	Able Ryder (Male)	
2009	Brütal Legend	Glamhogs, Thunderhogs	
2010	Resonance of Fate	Sullivan	
2010	Spider-Man: Shattered Dimensions	Spider-Ham, Additional voices	
2010	Star Wars: Clone Wars Adventures	Eeth Koth	
2010	Mass Effect 2	Etarn Tiron, Additional voices	
2010	How to Train Your Dragon	Gobber	
2010	Final Fantasy XIII	Cocoon Inhabitants (English Dub)	
2010	Alpha Protocol	Sergei Surkov	
2010	Assassin's Creed: Brotherhood	Additional voices	
2010	Halo: Reach	Grunt #1	
2011	Naruto Shippūden: Ultimate Ninja Impact	Hidan (English Dub)	
2011	Nicktoons MLB	Ren Höek	
2011	Gears of War 3	Sailor #1, Stranded Guard	
2011	The Lord of the Rings: War in the North	Aragorn	
2011	Naruto Shippūden: Ultimate Ninja Storm 2	Hidan (English Dub)	
2011	Iron Brigade	Claude	
2011	Cars 2	Additional voices	
2012	Naruto Shippūden: Ultimate Ninja Storm Generations	Hidan (English Dub)	
2012	Hitman: Absolution	Additional voices	
2012	Diablo III	Additional voices	
2012	Mass Effect 3	Additional voices	
2012	Disney Princess: My Fairytale Adventure	Scuttle	
2012	Kinect Star Wars	Felucian Farmer #2	
2013	Anarchy Reigns	Douglas Williamsburg, Garuda	
2013	Infinity Blade III	TEL	
2013	Lego The Lord of the Rings	Aragorn (sound effects), Eomer	
2013	Skylanders: Swap Force	Pop Thorn	
2013	Disney's Planes	Additional voices	
2013	DuckTales: Remastered	Gyro Gearloose	
2013	Naruto Shippūden: Ultimate Ninja Storm 3	Hidan, Additional Voices (English Dub)	
2013	Turbo: Super Stunt Squad	Chet	
2014	The Amazing Spider-Man 2	Dennis Carradine	
2014	Lightning Returns: Final Fantasy XIII	Additional Voices (English Dub)	
2014	Naruto Shippūden: Ultimate Ninja Storm Revolution	Hidan and Roshi (English Dub)	
2014	Skylanders: Trap Team	Pop Thorn	
2014	Disney Infinity: Marvel Super Heroes	Yondu	
2014	Diablo III: Reaper of Souls	Additional voices	
2014	How to Train Your Dragon: School of Dragons	Gobbler	
2015	Disney Infinity 3.0	Yondu	
2015	Skylanders: SuperChargers	Pop Thorn	
2016	Naruto Shippūden: Ultimate Ninja Storm 4	Hidan and Roshi (English Dub)	
2017	Fortnite	Llama Prize	
2019	Apex Legends	Pathfinder	
2020	Kingdom Hearts III Re Mind	Cid	

=== Theme parks ===
- The Amazing Adventures of Spider-Man – Peter Parker / Spider-Man, J. Jonah Jameson
- Dumbo the Flying Elephant – Timothy Q. Mouse
- The Little Mermaid: Ariel's Undersea Adventure – Scuttle
