= Andrée Vermeulen =

American actress

- Born: November 4, 1982 (age 43); Long Branch, New Jersey, U.S.
- Other name: Dre Vermeulen
- Occupation: Actress
- Known for: Angie Tribeca
- Children: 1

Andrée "Dre" Vermeulen (born November 4, 1982) is an American actress who plays Dr. Monica Scholls in the TBS comedy series Angie Tribeca. She also voices the character Ruffnut in DreamWorks Dragons.

== Early life and education ==
Born in Long Branch, New Jersey, Vermeulen grew up in Stroudsburg, Pennsylvania, with an American mother and a Belgian father. She studied drama at Marymount Manhattan College.

== Career ==
Vermeulen began her career with the Upright Citizens Brigade in 2008 in New York City and continued to work with them after her move to Los Angeles two years later. She is skilled at freestyle rapping in her UCB performances and cites Dana Carvey, Lil Wayne, and Q-Tip as influences. She credits her improv training for helping her get the role on Angie Tribeca, saying that understanding "the game of the scene" was essential to the Scholls character.

== Personal life ==
In November 2019, she became engaged to Damien Cortese. In December, she announced that she was expecting a baby girl who was born in May 2020.

== Filmography ==
=== Film ===
Year	Title	Role	Notes
2009	Laid Off	Angela Bolio	
2011	They're Out of the Business	Amy	
2013	iSteve	D'arcy	
2014	Dawn of the Dragon Racers	Ruffnut	Short
2018	All About Nina	Yolanda	
2019	Babysplitters	Marie	
2023	Craig Before the Creek	Eliza, Andy	

=== Television ===
Year	Title	Role	Notes
2008–2013	UCB Comedy Originals	Various roles	19 episodes
2009	The CollegeHumor Show	Hot Girl in a Purple Dress	Episode: "The Morning After"
2010–2014	CollegeHumor Originals	Various roles	9 episodes
2011–2012	FCU: Fact Checkers Unit	Amy	5 episodes
2012	NTSF:SD:SUV::	Juney	Episode: "16 Hop Street"
2013	New Girl	Beth	Episode: "Cooler"
2013	Single Siblings	Julie	Episode: "The Couple"
2013	Comedy Bang! Bang!	Reggie's Dream Girl	Episode: "Clark Gregg"
2013	Schlub Life	Ashley	Television film
2013–2014	DreamWorks Dragons	Ruffnut	76 episodes
2013, 2014	The Birthday Boys	Frank / Yolanda	2 episodes
2015	Doris & Mary-Anne Are Breaking Out of Prison	Doris	10 episodes
2015	Nothing to Report	Wife	Television film
2015–2017	Dragons: Race to the Edge	Ruffnut / Agnut	76 episodes
2016	Animals	Clarissa	Episode: "Pigeons"
2016–2018	Angie Tribeca	Monica Scholls	40 episodes
2017	Superstore	Shannon	Episode: "Valentine's Day"
2018–2022	Craig of the Creek	Eliza / Additional voices	13 episodes
2019	The Detour	Bernadette	Episode: "The B.J."
2019	It's Always Sunny in Philadelphia	Vet	Episode: "A Woman's Right to Chop"
2019, 2020	American Dad!	Rowdy Strip Club Patron	2 episodes
