= DreamWorks Dragons =

American animated television series

- Also known as: Dragons: Riders of Berk (season 1); Dragons: Defenders of Berk (season 2); Dragons: Race to the Edge (seasons 3–8)
- Genre: Fantasy; Comedy drama
- Based on: How to Train Your Dragon by; Chris Sanders; Dean DeBlois; William Davies; How to Train Your Dragon by Cressida Cowell
- Developed by: Linda Teverbaugh; Mike Teverbaugh
- Showrunners: Linda Teverbaugh; Mike Teverbaugh (both; episodes 1–5); Art Brown; Douglas Sloan (both; episodes 5–118)
- Voices of: Jay Baruchel; Chris Edgerly; America Ferrera; Christopher Mintz-Plasse; Julie Marcus; T.J. Miller; Nolan North; Zack Pearlman; Andrée Vermeulen
- Theme music composer: John Powell
- Opening theme: "This is Berk" (seasons 1–2) "Dragon Racing" (seasons 3–8)
- Composer: John Paesano
- Country of origin: United States
- Original language: English
- No. of seasons: 5
- No. of episodes: 118 (list of episodes)

Production
- Executive producers: Linda Teverbaugh; Mike Teverbaugh (both; episodes 1–5); Art Brown; Douglas Sloan (both; episodes 6–118)
- Producers: Cameron Stevning (episodes 1–27); Chad Hammes (episodes 14–79)
- Editors: John Laus; Lynn Hobson; Peter Tomaszewicz; Joel Fisher; Jay Fox; Ernesto Matamoros
- Running time: 22 minutes
- Production company: DreamWorks Animation Television

Original release
- Network: Cartoon Network
- Release: August 7, 2012 – March 5, 2014
- Network: Netflix
- Release: June 26, 2015 – February 16, 2018

Related
- DreamWorks Dragons: Rescue Riders (2019–2022); DreamWorks Dragons: The Nine Realms (2021–2023)

DreamWorks Dragons (or simply Dragons) is an American animated television series based on DreamWorks Animation's How to Train Your Dragon franchise, serving as a bridge between the first and second films. First announced in 2010 for Cartoon Network, the series premiered with a special preview on August 7, 2012, and began airing regularly on September 5. It was DreamWorks Animation Television's only series produced for Cartoon Network instead of Nickelodeon.

Jay Baruchel (Hiccup), America Ferrera (Astrid), Christopher Mintz-Plasse (Fishlegs) T.J. Miller (Tuffnut), and David Tennant (Spitelout) reprise their roles from the films, with new voice actors for Ruffnut (Julie Marcus, later replaced by Andrée Vermeulen), Snotlout (Zack Pearlman), Gobber the Belch (Chris Edgerly), and Stoick the Vast (Nolan North).

A total of 40 episodes aired on Cartoon Network across the first two seasons, which were subtitled Riders of Berk and Defenders of Berk respectively. In 2015, the series moved to Netflix and was rebranded Dragons: Race to the Edge, with the first season premiering on June 26. Four additional seasons were released on Netflix between January 2016 and August 2017, with these seasons making their linear debut on Universal Kids starting in September 2017. A sixth and final season was released on February 16, 2018.

== Plot ==
Taking place between How to Train Your Dragon and How to Train Your Dragon 2, DreamWorks Dragons follows Hiccup as he tries to keep balance within the new cohabitation of Dragons and Norse vikings. Alongside keeping up with Berk's newest installment—A Dragon Training Academy—Hiccup, Toothless, and the rest of the Viking Teens are put to the test when they are faced with new worlds harsher than Berk, new dragons that can't all be trained, and new enemies who are looking for every reason to destroy the harmony between Vikings and Dragons altogether.

== Voice cast and characters ==
=== Dragon Riders ===
- Jay Baruchel as Hiccup Horrendous Haddock, III – an awkward and underweight Viking and son of the chief of Berk. He and his dragon, Toothless, share the strongest bond of all riders and dragons.

- Toothless (vocal effects by Randy Thom) – Toothless is an extremely rare, male Night Fury befriended by Hiccup, and the dragon that lost his left tail fin in the first feature film. He has dark black scales, retractable teeth, and the ability to shoot plasma blasts. He also has the unique ability to navigate in dark places using echolocation.

- America Ferrera as Astrid Hofferson – Hiccup's close friend and love interest and the unofficial second-in-command of the dragon training academy. She has a strong character, is one of the most courageous of the Dragon Riders, and is very competitive. She has a strong bond with her dragon, Stormfly. During Season 5 of Race to the Edge, Hiccup gives Astrid a betrothal necklace, making them officially engaged to be married.

- Stormfly – A blue, female Deadly Nadder befriended by Astrid. Like Hiccup and Toothless, Astrid and Stormfly display exceptional teamwork. Stormfly and Toothless share a friendly rivalry in most of the competitions Hiccup and Astrid devise. In addition to her magnesium-fueled fire bursts, Stormfly can launch spines from her tail.

- Christopher Mintz-Plasse as Fishlegs Ingerman – one of Hiccup's close friends who has a great encyclopedic knowledge of dragons. He is not as courageous as the other Dragon Riders, but is a loyal friend, especially to Hiccup and Astrid. He has formed a very close relationship with his dragon, Meatlug.

- Meatlug – A brown, female Gronckle who bonded with Fishlegs. Because of her husky size and short wingspan, she lacks the aerobatic maneuverability and speed of the other dragons. She and Fishlegs have a very close, nurturing relationship. She also can eat a particular combination of iron ore and rocks and regurgitate a valuable metal known as "Gronckle iron".

- Zack Pearlman as Snotlout Jorgenson – one of Hiccup's friends who is reckless, quarrelsome, and often seen mocking or annoying the other riders. He has a complicated relationship with his dragon, Hookfang.

- Hookfang – A red, male Monstrous Nightmare, ridden by Snotlout. Hookfang has a habit of attacking Snotlout or abandoning him when Snotlout tries to assert dominance, and does not always pay attention to Snotlout. In battle, Hookfang covers his skin with his flammable saliva and sets it on fire, without harming himself; this ability is almost never used when Snotlout is riding him.

- T. J. Miller as Tuffnut Thorston, and Julie Marcus (season 1) and Andree Vermeulen (seasons 2–8) as Ruffnut Thorston – male and female dimwitted fraternal twins and followers of Hiccup. They constantly quarrel and disobey commands.

- Barf and Belch – A green, male, two-headed Hideous Zippleback jointly ridden by the twins, normally with Ruffnut riding the dragon's right head, named Barf (which can exhale explosive gas), and Tuffnut riding the dragon's left head, named Belch (which can ignite the gas). The heads are usually agreeable, but can have difficulty flying when their riders disagree, and sometimes quarrel as a result.

=== Notable inhabitants of Berk ===
- Nolan North as Stoick the Vast – the Chief of Berk and father to Hiccup who's immensely strong, fearless, fierce, and possessed of shrewd judgement and compassion. His first dragon is a Thunderdrum named Thornado, who is later released back into the wild. His second dragon is Skullcrusher, a Rumblehorn.
- Chris Edgerly as Gobber the Belch – the blacksmith of Berk, Stoick's closest friend, and Hiccup's mentor. Later he is seen riding a Hotburple named Grump.
- David Tennant as Spitelout Jorgenson – Snotlout's father. Spitelout takes pride in his son's achievements but seldom forgives his failures. He is a member of the A-team and rides a Deadly Nadder named Kingstail.
- Lucas Grabeel as Gustav Larson – a teenager who aspires to be a Dragon Rider. He takes Snotlout as his model and hero, especially in the first two seasons. He becomes the leader of Berk's A-Team and he rides a Monstrous Nightmare named Fanghook, based on Hookfang's name.
- Angela Bartys as Gothi – the village's shaman. As a mute, she communicates by gesturing or drawing lines and hieroglyphic-like pictures, translated by Gobber or Fishlegs. She rides a Gronckle as part of the A-team.
- Stephen Root as Mildew – is a cantankerous, spiteful, aged and generally disliked Berk local. He is a cabbage farmer and retains a strong hatred of dragons.
- Thomas F. Wilson as Buckett – a mentally impaired Viking, named for the bucket he wears on his head, allegedly to conceal a missing part of his brain. When the bucket grows tighter, the locals regard this as an early storm warning.
- Tim Conway (seasons 1–2) and Tom Kenny (seasons 3–8) as Mulch – Bucket's closest friend, usually seen by his side and frequently picking up the slack for Bucket.

=== Villains ===
- Michael Goldstrom as Johann – a seafaring merchant who occasionally visits Berk and trades mostly in curiosities. Prior to Dragons: Race to the Edge Season 5, he was thought to be an ally of the Dragon Riders. However, in the finale of Season 5, it is revealed that he has been undercover and is secretly working with Krogan to find and control a Bewilderbeast. He meets his end in "King of Dragons, Part 2", when the Bewilderbeast uses its ice to freeze him to death.
- Hakeem Kae-Kazim as Krogan – the leader of the Dragon Flyers who works for Drago Bludvist. His overconfidence often clashes with Viggo's patience. When he fails to retrieve a Bewilderbeast for his master in “King of Dragons, Part 2”, Drago has him executed.
- Alfred Molina as Viggo Grimborn – the leader of the Dragon Hunters and is usually accompanied by his older brother, Ryker Grimborn. Viggo is less strong than his brother, but for what he lacks in build he makes up for in intellect, frequently tricking and outsmarting the Dragon Riders. In "Triple Cross", he is betrayed by Johann and Krogan and has a change of heart before sacrificing himself to allow Hiccup and Toothless to escape.
- JB Blanc as Ryker Grimborn – the second-in-command of the Dragon Hunters and the elder brother of Viggo Grimborn. Ryker is physically stronger and more stubborn than his younger brother. He is killed in "Shell Shocked, Part 2" when the Submaripper swallows his ship.
- Paul Rugg as Savage – Alvin's right-hand man and later that of Dagur before he goes on his own in Dragons: Race to the Edge Season 4. In "Something Rotten on Berserker Island", he attempts to overthrow Dagur to become the new Chief of the Berserker Tribe, only to be defeated and imprisoned by him.
- Djimon Hounsou as Drago Bludvist – the warlord who commands all the hunters, trappers, and raiders that all the sub-villains commanded throughout all the various seasons of the show. He is the true villain behind Johann. He only made a cameo in the series finale of the show which tied the plot to the 2nd movie in the How to Train Your Dragon series, How to Train Your Dragon 2.

=== Secondary characters ===
- Mark Hamill as Alvin the Treacherous – Exiled from Berk for unspecified treachery (later revealed to be catching innocent bystanders in the crossfire of a dragon attack), he plots to displace his old friend, Stoick. He later becomes an ally of Berk at the end of Season 2.
- Mae Whitman as Heather – A mysterious teenage girl found by the Viking youths. Although she was at first introduced for actions against Berk, her true motive, to rescue her parents from Alvin the Treacherous, proved her loyalty. She returns in Season 3, bonding with a Razorwhip dragon named Windshear. She is later revealed to be Dagur's long-lost sister and pretends to be in league with him in order to get close to him and the newly unveiled dragon hunters. She leaves to parts unknown after her plot is uncovered by Viggo. She soon returns, showing romantic feelings for Fishlegs and joins the Dragon Riders. After being with the Dragon Riders for a while, she decides to leave for Berserker Island with her brother, Dagur.
- David Faustino as Dagur the Deranged – a villain-turned-ally and leader of the Berserker Tribe. He becomes obsessed with plotting to hunt and capture Toothless. He is later revealed to be the long-lost brother of Heather. After Dragons: Race to the Edge Season Two, he begins to acknowledge the aims of the Dragon Riders and starts to help them, along with his sister, Heather. Later, Dagur becomes a Dragon Rider with a Gronckle he named Shattermaster, and later on, Sleuther, a Triple Stryke that the Dragon Riders had previously rescued. In Season 6, he falls in love with and eventually marries Mala. Though he acts tough and aggressive, he is also rather sensitive.
- Defenders of the Wing – A tribe of warriors who first appear in the episode "Defenders of the Wing: Part 1". They worship dragons as holy beings and are led by Queen Mala (voiced by Adelaide Kane). They are at war with the Dragon Hunters and are therefore extremely distrusting of outsiders. Prior to encountering the Dragon Riders, they know nothing of riding or training dragons, as their culture forbids it. They live on a volcanic island home to an enormous dragon called the Eruptodon. They worship and protect the Eruptodon at all cost, as it feeds on the volcano's lava and prevents their village from being destroyed. Mala later falls in love with and marries Dagur the Deranged.
- Wingmaidens – An exclusively female warrior tribe led by their chieftess Atali (voiced by Rose McIver) who first appear in the episode "Snotlout’s Angels". They care for baby Razorwhips who become their wings until they are old enough to fend for themselves because the adult males of the species would devour the infants and could drive the species to extinction.

== Episodes ==
Season	Subtitle	Episodes	Originally released		
Season	Subtitle	Episodes	First released	Last released	Network
1	Riders of Berk	20	August 7, 2012	March 20, 2013	Cartoon Network
2	Defenders of Berk	20	September 19, 2013	March 5, 2014	Cartoon Network
3	Race to the Edge	13	June 26, 2015		Netflix
4	Race to the Edge	13	January 8, 2016		Netflix
5	Race to the Edge	13	June 24, 2016		Netflix
6	Race to the Edge	13	February 17, 2017		Netflix
7	Race to the Edge	13	August 25, 2017		Netflix
8	Race to the Edge	13	February 16, 2018		Netflix

== Production ==
On October 12, 2010, it was announced that Cartoon Network had acquired worldwide broadcast rights to a weekly animated series based on the film. According to Tim Johnson, executive producer for How to Train Your Dragon, the series was planned to be much darker and deeper than DreamWorks Animation's previous television series spin-offs, with a similar tone to the film, and would follow after the events of the first film. DreamWorks Dragons is also the first (and only) DreamWorks Animation series produced for Cartoon Network as previous television series, including The Penguins of Madagascar, Kung Fu Panda: Legends of Awesomeness, and later Monsters vs. Aliens, were produced for Nickelodeon.

Although it was initially announced that the series would be called Dragons: The Series, the San Diego Comic-Con schedule announced in June 2012 revealed the new title to be Dragons: Riders of Berk. The second season of the show was titled Dragons: Defenders of Berk. At the end of May 2014, DreamWorks Animation announced that the series would move to Netflix in spring 2015.

== Reception ==
=== Critical response ===
Dragons: Riders of Berk has received positive reviews. Brian Lowry of Variety reviewed the series: "The program is dazzling visually, and pretty effortlessly picks up where the narrative left off," although he noted the initial episodes' "lack of actual villains" and "not-particularly-stirring array of characters". Mary McNamara of Los Angeles Times said that it "retains both the personality and production value of its progenitor. Dragons promise to be lively and entertaining, with great visuals of dragons swooping and soaring." She praised its look: "It looks pretty dang spectacular even by today's standards. It's so crisply drawn and fluid that a person of a certain age would be forgiven for wondering how on earth we survived with things like Scooby-Doo and The Perils of Penelope Pitstop." According to Nielsen Media Research, episodes of the first season ranked on average #1 in their time slot among boys 2–14.

=== Accolades ===
Year	Association	Category	Nominee	Result
2012	Annie Awards	Best Animated Television Production For Children	Episode: "How to Pick Your Dragon"	Won
2012	Annie Awards	Character Animation in an Animated Television/Broadcast Production	Shi Zimu	Nominated
2012	Annie Awards	Character Animation in an Animated Television/Broadcast Production	Teri Yam	Nominated
2012	Annie Awards	Character Animation in an Animated Television/Broadcast Production	Yan Jiazhuang	Nominated
2012	Annie Awards	Character Design in an Animated Television/Broadcast Production	Andy Bialk (for "Alvin and the Outcasts")	Nominated
2012	Annie Awards	Directing in an Animated Television/Broadcast Production	John Eng (for "Animal House")	Won
2012	Annie Awards	Music in an Animated Television/Broadcast Production	John Paesano (for "How to Pick Your Dragon")	Won
2012	Annie Awards	Storyboarding in an Animated Television/Broadcast Production	Doug Lovelace (for "Portrait of Hiccup as a Buff Man")	Won
2012	Annie Awards	Writing in an Animated Television/Broadcast Production	Mike Teverbaugh, Linda Teverbaugh (for "Animal House")	Nominated
2012	Annie Awards	Editorial in an Animated Television Production	Lynn Hobson (for "Animal House")	Nominated
2013	Primetime Emmy Award	Outstanding Individual Achievement In Animation – Character Design (for "We Are Family: Part 2")	Andy Bialk	Won
2013	Annie Awards	Animated Effects in an Animated Production	David Jones	Nominated
2013	Annie Awards	Directing in an Animated Television/Broadcast Production	Elaine Bogan	Nominated
2013	Annie Awards	Storyboarding in an Animated Television/Broadcast Production	Douglas Lovelace	Nominated
2013	Annie Awards	Editorial in an Animated Television/Broadcast Production	Lynn Hobson	Nominated
2015	Annie Awards	Outstanding Achievement, Editorial in an Animated TV/Broadcast Production	Ernesto Matamoros	Nominated
2016	Annie Awards	Outstanding Achievement for Character Animation in a Television/Broadcast Production	Chi-Ho Chan	Won
2016	Daytime Emmy Awards	Outstanding Children's Animated Program	Art Brown, Douglas Sloan, Chad Hammes and Lawrence Jonas	Nominated
2016	Daytime Emmy Awards	Outstanding Writing in an Animated Program	Art Brown and Douglas Sloan	Nominated
2016	Daytime Emmy Awards	Outstanding Sound Mixing - Animation	Carlos Sanches and Otis Van Osten	Nominated
2016	Daytime Emmy Awards	Outstanding Casting for an Animated Series or Special	Christi Soper and Ania O'Hare	Nominated
2016	Daytime Emmy Awards	Outstanding Sound Editing - Animation	Otis Van Osten, Joshua Aaron Johnson, Roger Pallan and Jason Oliver	Won
2016	Saturn Awards	Best New Media Television Series	DreamWorks Dragons	Nominated
2017	Daytime Emmy Awards	Outstanding Children's Animated Program	Art Brown, Douglas Sloan, Chad Hammes and Lawrence Jonas	Nominated
2017	Daytime Emmy Awards	Outstanding Sound Editing - Animation	Otis Van Osten, Dan Smith, Joshua Aaron Johnson and Jason Oliver	Nominated
2017	Daytime Emmy Awards	Outstanding Sound Mixing - Animation	Carlos Sanches and Otis Van Osten	Nominated
2018	Daytime Emmy Awards	Outstanding Sound Mixing - Animation	Carlos Sanches and Otis Van Osten	Nominated
2019	Daytime Emmy Awards	Outstanding Performer in an Animated Program	Jay Baruchel (as Hiccup)	Won

== Video games ==
A 3D Unity-based in-browser game, titled Dragons: Wild Skies, was launched on August 27, 2012, on CartoonNetwork.com. Players will go through a tutorial with Hiccup, and train a Deadly Nadder, before being able to free roam around the several islands in the Barbaric Archipelago, with dragons scattered around them. The player can choose to be a blonde/brunette male or female Viking, before setting off to explore the islands. To train a dragon, players must feed the dragons correct food before doing correct gestures to gain the dragon's trust. In the game, players do not die or otherwise fail. Players complete challenges to earn gold for buying tools to obtain food for training dragons. The overworld consists of six islands, each with a unique dragon to tame. The number of dragons and worlds to explore is set to expand over time, as the series introduces more and more places and dragons...

== Home media ==
A DVD collection of the first four episodes, titled Dragons: Riders of Berk, was released on November 20, 2012. The first season of the series was released on DVD in two parts on July 23, 2013. Dragons: Riders of Berk: Part 1 contained episodes from 1 to 11, and Dragons: Riders of Berk: Part 2, episodes from 12 to 20. In December 2013, Walmart released an exclusive pack containing the complete first season in a special edition "Toothless" plastic package. A DVD collection of the first 10 episodes of the second season, titled Dragons: Defenders of Berk: Part 1, was released on March 25, 2014. The second part, titled Dragons: Defenders of Berk: Part 2, was later released on May 27, 2014. On February 12, 2019, the first two seasons of Dragons: Race to the Edge was released on DVD in one set. Seasons three and four were released on DVD on March 5, 2019, and seasons five and six were released on DVD on March 26, 2019, albeit all only in Region 1 format.
