= Cris Cole =

British writer and producer

Crispin "Cris" Cole is a British writer and producer.

== Career ==
Born in Wallingford, England, Cole grew up in London and attended Elliott School in Roehampton. After leaving the Elliott School, he worked as a professional guitarist and bass player for the next 15 years, playing in bands including Jimmy the Hoover, The Directions and The Hollywood Killers.

Cole turned to writing and wrote a pilot for Tiger Aspect/BBC, called Embassy, starring Robert Daws. He has multiple other TV credits, including episodes of Night and Day, Twisted Tales and The Bill, feature film credits, including Lovebite (Ecosse Films, 2012) and Pelican Blood (Ecosse Films, 2010), as well as the TV movie The Good Times Are Killing Me (Shaftesbury Films, 2009). He wrote and executive produced the film Ana, released in January 2020, starring Andy Garcia and Dafne Keen.

Cole may be best known as the creator of the award-winning and the BAFTA nominated British TV series Mad Dogs, starring Marc Warren, Max Beesley, John Simm and Phil Glenister. He was the sole writer of all 14 episodes for the four UK seasons for Sky TV, produced by Left Bank Pictures.

Cole was the executive producer and showrunner on the Mad Dogs U.S. television series made by Amazon Studios/Sony Pictures Television. The show was streamed on Amazon in the US, Germany and the UK. Sony sold Mad Dogs to 140 other territories. The series starred Ben Chaplin, Michael Imperioli, Romany Malco, Steve Zahn and Billy Zane.

Cole has been an advocate of Ethiopian choreographer Meseret Yirga for over 20 years. In 2019 he headed a fundraising campaign to build a community dance centre in Addis Ababa. Once the money was in place, the Meseret Yirga Dance Centre was built, is now open, and serves people from low income backgrounds and the disabled in the community.

In 2022 Cole created, wrote and exec-produced ‘Rose & Layla’, a ten part TV comedy drama serial for MBC Studios, starring Egyptian TV and movie icon Yousra and Nelly Karim as two Cairo based private detectives. Shot in Cairo and directed by Adrian Shergold the show was written in English and translated and made in Arabic.

== Personal life ==
Cole is the son of the actor George Cole and actress Eileen Moore. He is married to Christine St. John.

== Filmography ==
- Embassy (1997)
- Night & Day (2001)
- Spine Chillers (2003)
- The Bill, 2 episodes (2004–2005)
- Twisted Tales, 1 episode (2005)
- The Good Times Are Killing Me (2009)
- Pelican Blood (2010)
- Mad Dogs (UK) (2011–2013)
- Love Bite (2012)
- Mad Dogs (U.S.) (2015)
- Ana (2020)
- Rose & Layla (2022)
