= Ana (2020 film) =

- Theatrical release poster
- Directed by: Charles McDougall
- Screenplay by: Cris Cole
- Story by: Cris Cole; Charles McDougall; Luillo Ruiz; Jorge González
- Produced by: Belly Torres; Bobby Ranghelov; Luillo Ruiz
- Starring: Andy García; Dafne Keen; Jeanne Tripplehorn; Lauren Vélez; Ramón Franco
- Cinematography: Sonnel Velázquez
- Edited by: Robert Ivison
- Music by: Geronimo Mercado
- Production companies: Pimienta; Blue Rider Pictures; Dragonfly Cinematic
- Distributed by: Gravitas Ventures
- Release date: January 3, 2020
- Running time: 106 minutes
- Country: United States
- Language: English

Ana (released in some territories as The Guardian) is a 2020 American comedy-drama film directed by Charles McDougall and written by Cris Cole, from a story by McDougall, Cole, Luillo Ruiz and Jorge González. The film is set in Puerto Rico in the aftermath of the devastating 2017 Hurricane Maria, and stars Andy García as struggling used car salesman Rafael "Rafa" Rodriguez and Dafne Keen as Ana, an 11-year-old girl placed in Rafa's care as the two embark on a road trip across Puerto Rico. The film also features Jeanne Tripplehorn, Lauren Vélez and Ramón Franco in supporting roles. It received generally positive reviews, praising the performances and setting while criticizing the story.

The film was released on video on demand by Gravitas Ventures on January 3, 2020.

== Plot ==
In the aftermath of Hurricane Maria, Puerto Rico faces severe economic downturn. Jose Maria Vega runs for Governor of Puerto Rico, despite allegations of illegal campaign financing. In San Juan, Rafael "Rafa" Rodriguez is a struggling car salesman who moved from Florida after becoming estranged from his children.

Rafa discovers 11-year-old Ana, who lives across the street from his car yard, hiding after her mother's arrest. Initially planning to take Ana to social services, Rafa feels guilty at the prospect of negligent foster parents. Rafa is horrified to discover that all his cars have been repossessed for failing to repay loans. Rafa decides to go to a cockfight to win the money he needs. Ana secretly follows him and witnesses him losing $5,000 and being warned by loan shark Diego that he has five days to repay. Rafa tries to leave Ana with her mother's abusive boyfriend but is unable.

Ana confronts Rafa, claiming he needs help to raise the money by the deadline. Rafa visits Ana's mother in prison, discovering Ana's father lives on the other side of Puerto Rico. Rafa and Ana set off together, to deliver Ana to her father and to raise money. Rafa and Ana visit Camila, an ex-lover of Rafa who owes him $1,000. Rafa is hesitant to ask Camila for his money given the financial crisis, but Ana is blunt and forces Camila to pay.

During the trip, Ana attempts illegal forms of raising money, from not paying for petrol and buying moonshine to resell. Rafa is resistant, fearing Ana will end up like her mother, and tries to instill values in her. Rafa takes Ana to a blowhole, telling her a fable of a man who fell in and nearly drowned, but was saved by God for his honesty and humility when water blew out of the blowhole. Rafa acknowledges that some of Ana's methods may be necessary to raise the money.

Rafa reminds Ana that she has to live with her father once they arrive. Diego calls Rafa, having discovered that he has left San Juan and that all of his cars are gone, but Rafa assures Diego that he will repay the money. Finding Ana's father, Rafa and Ana discover that he claims not be her father and has another family. Rafa is unsure what to do with Ana. Fearing Rafa will take her to a foster home, Ana runs away. After they reunite, Rafa is furious and takes Ana to a church, hoping to find her a home.

Ana pretends to be disabled to collect money from churchgoers. Her deception is discovered and the church's pastor Helen forces Ana to perform volunteer work. Realizing the churchgoers' generosity toward Ana could be exploited, Helen makes Ana pretends her disability was healed by a blowhole and promises Ana a percentage of the money raised. Rafa is initially supportive. Camila attends the church and recognizes Ana, horrified at the deception. Rafa realizes the immorality of the scheme. However, Ana feels at home at the church and wants to stay, leaving Rafa to return to San Juan.

Admitting to Diego that he cannot pay, Rafa escapes from one of Diego's thugs and visits Ana. Ana seems happy at the church; however, she gives Rafa a pamphlet with "$5,000" written in it, implying that she is still raising the money for him. Rafa is arrested for possession of moonshine.

Ana asks Helen for her cut of the money. Helen reveals that Ana's cut has been donated to Vega's campaign, revealing the church is part of the illegal financing. Ana leaves the church and travels to the blowhole, coming to an epiphany. Contacting Diego, Ana proposes a scheme: Diego posts Rafa's bail and poses as an IRS agent to force Helen, using a recording Ana made of her admission, to repay the money or face jail time for fraud. Diego's money is repaid in full, and Rafa is freed.

Returning to San Juan, Rafa reopens his car yard with the excess money. Vega is arrested for illegal campaign finance. Ana's mother is freed and dumps her boyfriend. Ana works at the car yard and remains close friends with Rafa, who has been reunited with his children.

== Cast ==
- Andy García as Rafael "Rafa" Rodriguez, a struggling used car salesman from Florida who moved to Puerto Rico after becoming estranged from his children. Despite his cynicism at his failures in life and his addiction to betting on cockfights, Rafa is a fundamentally moral person who believes in honesty and humility.
- Dafne Keen as Ana, an 11-year-old girl who is left parentless when her single mother is arrested. Despite her predicament, Ana is peppy and upbeat, often encouraging Rafa to "show some hustle", but lacks Rafa's moral compass when it comes to using crime and manipulation to get ahead.
- Jeanne Tripplehorn as Helen, the pastor of a church that takes Ana in and uses her to increase donations to the church, and in doing so reveals that the church has illegal connections to a political candidate.
- Lauren Vélez (credited as Luna Lauren Vélez) as Camila, an ex-lover of Rafa who owes him money. She claims to be hard-hit by the economic downturn, but Ana discovers she is hoarding money and expensive items, however she is shown to have a moral compass.
- Ramón Franco as Diego, a loan shark to whom Rafa owes money. He violently pursues those who do not pay him, but he takes pity on Rafa after Ana proposes a scheme whereby Diego helps Rafa to repay the money.

The film also features supporting roles by Blas Sien Diaz as Diego's henchman Miguel, Johnathan Dwayne as corrupt political candidate Jose Maria Vega, Aris Mejias as Ana's mother, and Maria Coral Otero Soto as the leader of a church summer camp which Ana attends.

== Production ==
Dafne Keen made her film debut in 2017, playing the supporting role of Laura / X-23 in Logan, a standalone installment of the X-Men franchise. Logan was a critical and commercial success and Keen's performance was well-received, earning her an Empire Award for Best Female Newcomer at the 23rd Empire Awards. Despite not having a talent agent at the time, Keen was quickly signed on to star the title character in Ana, a road trip drama written by Cris Cole, directed by Charles McDougall, and produced by Luillo Ruiz through his production company Pimienta. In May 2017, Keen was officially announced to be starring alongside Puerto Rican actor Luis Guzmán.

By the time shooting for the film began in July 2017, Guzmán had been replaced by Andy García. Keen confirmed on her Twitter page in August 2017 that shooting was underway with García in the lead role. During shooting, distribution company AMP International was expected to handle international distribution of the film, described as a story following "a street-smart urchin and a financially destitute car salesman whose friendship blooms after a chance encounter. The pair embark on a road trip to try and save him from bankruptcy... or worse."

The film was shot entirely on location in Puerto Rico by a Puerto Rican crew. Of this decision, producer Luillo Ruiz said "This is a very dear project for us about an island, a girl, a father figure and this amazing journey of self-discovery. We were very fortunate to get two brilliant actors, Andy [García] and Dafne [Keen], whose chemistry shines on screen. They give incredible depth to this unlikely duo. It was completely filmed in Puerto Rico by Puerto Rican crew and the result is fantastic."

== Release ==
By December 2019, the film's distribution rights were picked up by online distribution company Gravitas Ventures. By that time, Keen had begun starring in the BBC/HBO television series His Dark Materials, based on the trilogy of fantasy novels of the same name by English novelist Philip Pullman. Keen starred as the series' lead character Lyra Belacqua / Lyra Silvertongue and received praise for her performance.

Of the film, Gravitas Ventures vice-president of acquisitions Tony Piantedosi said "[Director] Charles [McDougall] has crafted a vibrant road movie, bolstered by the lively rapport between Dafne [Keen] and Andy [García], that the whole family can enjoy." Gravitas Ventures opted to give the film a limited theatrical release, while also releasing it to video on demand services worldwide on January 3, 2020. In the United States, the film was made available for purchase or rental on Amazon Prime Video, iTunes, Vudu, and other similar services.

== Reception ==
Ana received mixed reviews, with praise for García and Keen's performances, the Puerto Rican setting, and the film's avoidance of the "trappings of a road trip movie".

Some reviews were highly positive. Writing for Cinema Babel, Garrett Eberhardt wrote that "Ana is a charming, funny, and socially relevant surprise", praising the performances as the "heartbeat of the film and what gives it its power and purpose." Eberhardt praised the "heartfelt" relationship between the leads and the cinematography by Sonnel Velázquez (comparing it to Vittorio Storaro's cinematography for the 1979 film Apocalypse Now) which he believed "show[ed] off the lush, colorful locales of the Puerto Rican island along with some eye-popping shots and camera work." Eberhardt noted the film's social commentary, featuring a corrupt politician who promises to improve people's lives, and the theme of "desperate... people... forced to do what they must to survive."

Other reviews were mixed, while still complementing the film's performances and unique approach to the road trip genre. Cinemarter's review of the film described it as "formulaic", while still praising the Puerto Rican setting as helping it to stand out and the chemistry between the leads as being "enough to make it not a bad watch", and ultimately calling the film a "better-than-average road trip movie."

Keith & the Movies' review echoed these thoughts, describing the Puerto Rican setting as "compelling... and... a key player throughout the film", particularly praising the depiction of Hurricane Maria's economic aftermath. The review noted the film's familiar story and described the church storyline as being a "speed bump", but ultimately described the film as "a surprisingly sweet and heartfelt movie... full of warmth and humor."

Similarly, Amari Allah's review for Wherever I Look praised Keen's "charisma and presence" and compared her rising career to that of Natalie Portman in the 1990s, writing that Keen and García "enhance each other's presence to the point you can forgive the film's shortcomings." Allah also praised how the film "address[ed] all aspects of post-Hurricane Maria Puerto Rico", while criticizing the writing as being "surface-level" and the story as "overstaying its welcome", while still conceding that the film is "firmly... worth seeing."
