= Mad Dogs (American TV series) =

American comedy thriller television series

- Genre: Comedy thriller
- Created by: Cris Cole
- Based on: Mad Dogs by Cris Cole
- Written by: Cris Cole; Michael C. Martin; Zev Borow; Brett C. Leonard; Eileen Myers; Kent Rotherham; Shawn Ryan; Jon Worley
- Directed by: Charles McDougall; Uta Briesewitz; Clark Johnson; John David Coles; Randall Einhorn; Guy Ferland; Alex Graves; Ted Griffin; Mark Piznarski; Craig Zisk
- Starring: Ben Chaplin; Michael Imperioli; Romany Malco; Steve Zahn; Phil Davis
- Composer: Robert Duncan
- Country of origin: United States
- Original language: English
- No. of seasons: 1
- No. of episodes: 10

Production
- Executive producers: Suzanne Mackie; Cris Cole; Andy Harries; Shawn Ryan; Danielle Weinstock
- Producers: Luillo Ruiz; Jon Worley; Ken Topolsky
- Cinematography: Bernard Couture; Raphy Molinary; Nelson Cragg
- Editors: Debbie Berman; David Kaldor; Robert Ivison; C.J. Liao; Scott Pellet; Robert Komatsu; Amy M. Fleming
- Running time: 40–56 minutes
- Production companies: MiddKid Productions; Cris Cole Productions; Left Bank Pictures; Amazon Studios; Sony Pictures Television

Original release
- Network: Amazon Prime Video
- Release: January 15, 2015 – January 22, 2016

Mad Dogs is an American comedy thriller television series produced by Amazon Prime Video. It is a partial remake of the British show, also named Mad Dogs, that aired from 2011 to 2013.

== Background ==
The show's first season consisted of 10 episodes, expanding on the British version's first season's four hours of content. It began airing on January 22, 2016 in the U.S., U.K., and Germany, with an early release of the show available in December 2015.

== Premise ==
The plot is a "cocktail of testosterone and bad decision-making", focused on the angst of a group of 40-something underachieving American men who become caught in a "vacation from hell".

== Casting ==
The actors include Billy Zane as a man wealthy from underworld connections who invites his friends for a stay in Belize, Michael Imperioli as an irresponsible but good-hearted former traveling musician, Romany Malco as a family man, and Ben Chaplin (who starred in the Zane role in the UK version of the show) as an embittered teacher. The show's female cast, including Allison Tolman and María Botto (reprising her role from the UK series), provide contrast to the male leads.

== Cast ==
=== Main cast ===
- Ben Chaplin as Joel
- Michael Imperioli as Lex
- Romany Malco as Gus
- Steve Zahn as Cobi
- Phil Davis as Lawrence, a local crime boss

=== Recurring cast ===
- Mark Povinelli as The Cat, a hitman
- Rachael Holmes as Erica, a local pharmacy worker
- Maria Botto as Sophia Moreno, a local police woman
- Coby Bell as Aaron, a CIA agent
- Allison Tolman as Rochelle, an employee at the Embassy of the United States in Belize
- Billy Zane as Milo
- Ted Levine as Conrad Tull, an FBI agent
- Sutton Foster as Gerda

== Production ==
Showrunner Cris Cole adapted the show from his own drama in the UK. It was originally under development at the FX network. Cole noted that because the American version is 10 hours to the British version's first season's four hours, the last six hours of the American version are "virgin territory" and have no comparative to the original.

Rights to air the show were sold by Sony Pictures Television for more than 140 countries prior to the initial Amazon airing.

In late-February 2016, Amazon announced that it had opted not to renew the series. Although the original intention had been for the show to be a 10 episode limited series, Amazon and the show leadership had broached the idea of a potential second season.

During filming of scenes of the pilot episode in Puerto Rico, actor Steve Zahn contracted dengue fever.

== Reception ==
The show earned mostly positive reviews and anecdotal evidence pointed to solid early viewership. Critics have praised the cinematography of Belize in the "blue sky" show as "gorgeous." The first season holds a rating of 64 out of a 100 on metacritic.

Critics note that the show wanders during its formulaic middle episodes of the season but is best as interpersonal conflicts are the focus. Amazon opted not to renew the series for a second season. About the cancellation, Co-showrunner Shawn Ryan said:

“Somebody at Amazon leaked the ratings to me and they indicated we should have been picked up for a second season. They had a regime in place then that isn’t there now. I was frustrated because the show was good and it was, at the time, their third-highest-rated show behind, Man in the High Castle and Bosch, and it was four or five times the viewership of Transparent, but there were people there who didn’t think the show was going to succeed and then were shocked when it got good reviews and it got the viewership and did but they already had made a business decision to move on.“

== Episodes ==
No.	Title	Directed by	Written by	Original release date
1	"Pilot"	Charles McDougall	Cris Cole	January 15, 2015
2	"Xtabai"	Alex Graves	Shawn Ryan	January 22, 2016
3	"Well"	Randall Einhorn	Cris Cole	January 22, 2016
4	"Flares"	Clark Johnson	Brett C. Leonard & Cris Cole	January 22, 2016
5	"Hat"	Uta Briesewitz	Eileen Myers	January 22, 2016
6	"Leslie"	Craig Zisk	Michael C. Martin	January 22, 2016
7	"Ice Cream"	Guy Ferland	Zev Borow	January 22, 2016
8	"Broodstock"	Mark Piznarksi	Jon Worley	January 22, 2016
9	"Seahorse"	Ted Griffin	Kent Rotherham	January 22, 2016
10	"Needles"	John David Coles	Cris Cole	January 22, 2016
