= Pelican Blood (2010 film) =

- Film poster
- Directed by: Karl Golden
- Written by: Cris Cole
- Based on: Pelican Blood by Cris Freddi
- Produced by: Robert Bernstein; Douglas Rae; John McDonnell
- Starring: Arthur Darvill; Oona Chaplin; Harry Treadaway; Emma Booth
- Cinematography: Darran Tiernan
- Edited by: Martin Brinkler
- Music by: Niall Byrne
- Production company: Ecosse Films
- Release date: September 8, 2010 (Toronto)
- Running time: 94 minutes
- Country: United Kingdom
- Language: English

Pelican Blood is a 2010 film which premiered at the 2010 Edinburgh Film Festival. It is a low-budget film, shot in a freewheeling style, directed by Karl Golden, adapted from Cris Freddi's novel by Cris Cole. The two main protagonists, Nikko (Harry Treadaway), and Stevie (Emma Booth), are self-destructive people who have met through a suicide website. Nikko has an obsessive compulsive personality.

"Pelican Blood is a fraught drama about youthful angst and rebelliousness set (very incongruously) in the world of birdwatching... that evokes memories of Trainspotting...[It] doesn't really hang together. None the less, there is enough raw talent here to enable the film to take wing."
