= Christine St. John =

American actress and playwright (born 1954)

- Born: 1954 (age 71–72)
- Education: DePaul University; Sorbonne University; American Center for Art and Culture
- Occupations: Actress; playwright
- Spouse: Cris Cole

Christine St. John (born 1954) is an American actress and playwright.

== Career ==
St. John graduated in 1976 from the Goodman School of Drama of the Art Institute of Chicago. She further studied at Sorbonne University and with Atelier Blanche Salant and Paul Weaver at The American Center for Art and Culture in Paris, from 1976 to 1977. She has worked continuously in the theatre over the past 50 years.

In 2014, she wrote and performed her one-woman play Bette Davis on The Edge. She toured her play from 2014 until 2019 in the US and England. She performed her play in Singapore for Wag the Dog Theatre Company and won a place performing Off Broadway, New York City, for United Solo Artists.

She gave a one-off benefit performance of her play at Zuma Museum, Addis Ababa, Ethiopia, for her friend Meseret Yirga and in support of The Meseret Yirga Centre.

St. John has been a fellow of the Royal Geographical Society for 30 years.

She and her husband, Cris Cole, are based in London.
