= Dafne Keen =

Spanish-British actress (born 2005)

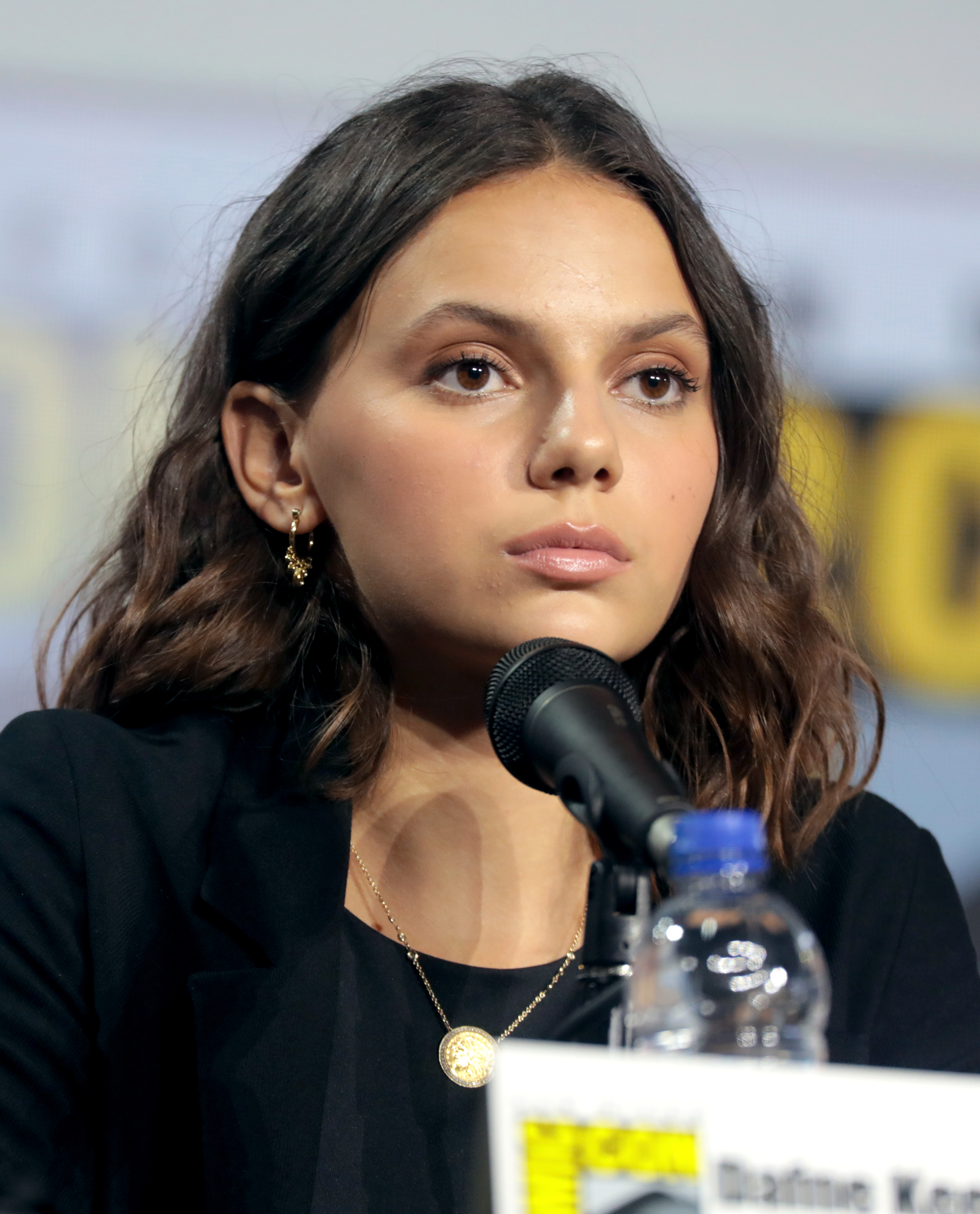
- Keen in 2019
- Born: Dafne María Keen Fernández; 4 January 2005 (age 21); Madrid, Spain
- Citizenship: Spain; United Kingdom
- Occupation: Actress
- Years active: 2015–present
- Father: Will Keen
- Relatives: Laura Beatty (aunt); Alice Oswald (aunt); Edward Curzon, 6th Earl Howe (great-grandfather)

Dafne María Keen Fernández (born 4 January 2005) is a Spanish and British actress. She became known for playing Laura / X-23 in the films Logan (2017) and Deadpool & Wolverine (2024), earning nominations at the Critics' Choice Awards, the Saturn Awards, and nods from numerous critics associations. She also played Lyra Belacqua in the television series His Dark Materials (2019–2022), receiving a nomination for a British Academy Cymru Award.

== Early life ==
Keen was born on 4 January 2005 in Madrid. Her parents are English actor Will Keen and Spanish actress and director María Fernández Ache. Her aunts are poet Alice Oswald and writer Laura Beatty. Through her father's side of the family she is related to multiple members of the British aristocracy such as her great-grandfather, Edward Curzon, 6th Earl Howe; 4th great-grandfather John Fane, 11th Earl of Westmorland, and 6th great-uncle Arthur Wellesley, 1st Duke of Wellington.

== Career ==
Keen made her acting debut in 2015 at the age of 10, on the BBC television series The Refugees, where she starred alongside her father Will. The show ran during 2015, ending after one season.

Keen was next cast in James Mangold's superhero film Logan as Laura, the child clone of Wolverine, played by Hugh Jackman. Casting director Priscilla John endorsed Keen for the role, saying that "She had an innocence and a vulnerability... people are going to fall in love with her." The film was released in 2017 to commercial and critical success, and is ranked among the best superhero movies of all time. Writing for Vanity Fair, Lisa Liebman called Keen "extraordinary" and "memorable not only for her slice-and-dice adamantium-claw action scenes but also for her ability to convey the young heroine's feral yet innocent nature." Tasha Robinson of The Verge said Keen's "indomitability and ferocious energy go a long way toward keeping the film from wallowing in its own misery." Keen won the Empire Award for Best Newcomer, and nominations from the Critics' Choice Movie Awards, Chicago Film Critics Association, and Saturn Awards, among other accolades.

In 2018, Keen was cast as Lyra Belacqua in the BBC/HBO series His Dark Materials, an adaptation of the book trilogy of the same name. To prepare for the role, Keen "religiously" read the books in her first two weeks on set. Her father Will stars with her, playing Hugh MacPhail. The series ran from 2019 to 2022. Keen remarked to W that "I've grown up on the show. It's really hitting me now." On her portrayal, The Hollywood Reporter's Daniel Fienberg called Keen "star-studded" and Allison Shoemaker for RogerEbert.com said she was "excellent (and perfectly cast)". Keen was nominated for the British Academy Cymru for Best Actress in 2020.

Keen next starred alongside Andy García in Charles McDougall's comedy-drama film Ana. She worked on the film immediately after Logan in 2017, and after a series of delays, it was released in 2020. The film received mixed reviews, although Amari Allah of Wherever I Look praised Keen's "charisma and presence" and compared her to a younger Natalie Portman.

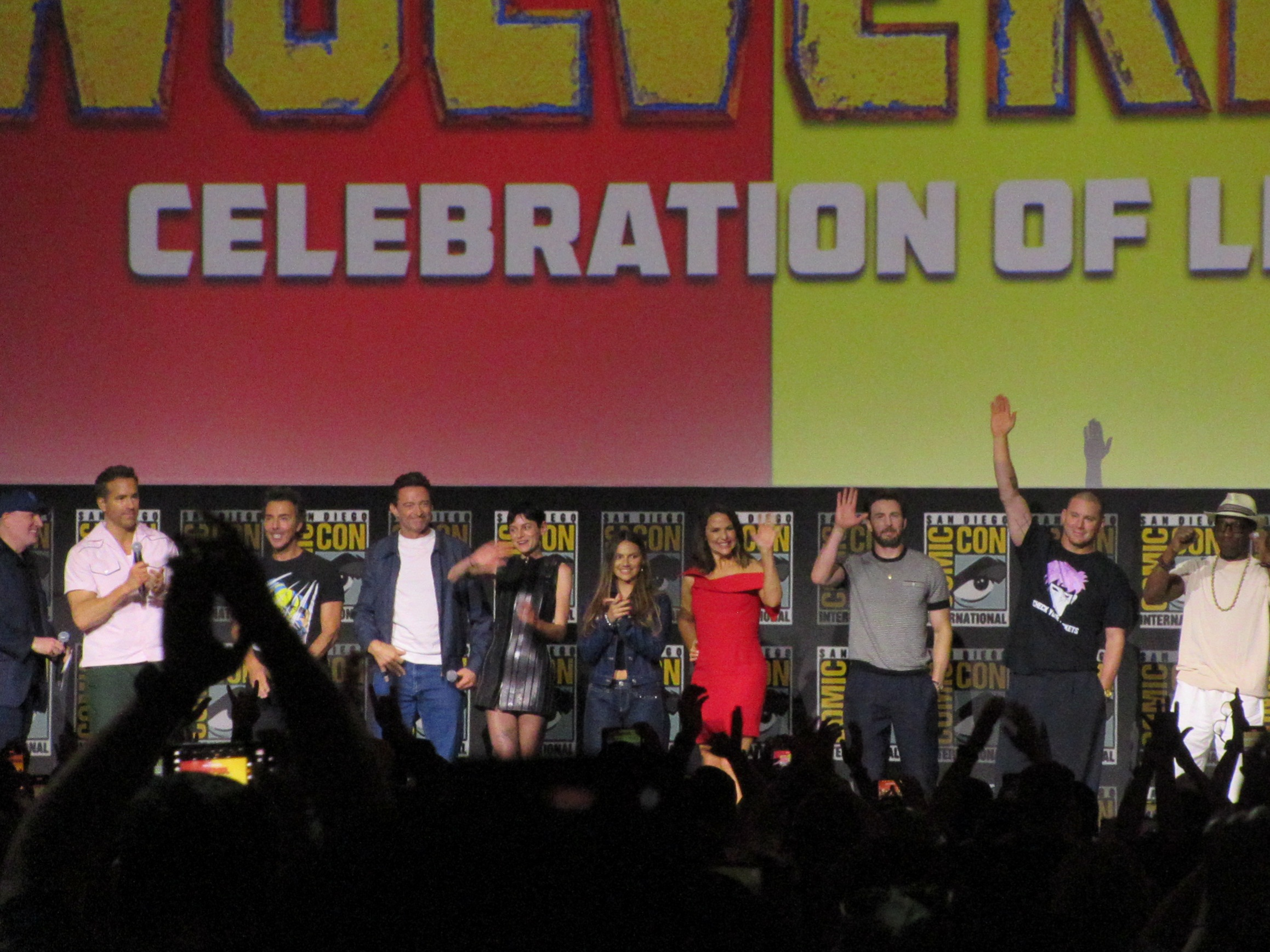
Keen with the cast of Deadpool & Wolverine at San Diego Comic-Con in 2024

In 2022, Keen joined the cast of Leslye Headland's Star Wars series The Acolyte. Headland created the character Jecki for Keen after seeing her performance in Logan. Keen got into character by listening to David Bowie and joked with Headland that her character also looked like the musician. The series premiered on Disney+ in 2024. Also in 2024, in a surprise reveal, she reprised her role as Laura in the Marvel Cinematic Universe film Deadpool & Wolverine, reuniting with Jackman. It became Keen's highest-grossing release, the second-highest-grossing film of 2024, and the second highest-grossing R-rated film of all time.

In 2025, Keen starred in the horror film Whistle, directed by Corin Hardy. She will next star in Jay Hernandez's directorial debut Night Comes and the third season of the Disney+ adaptation of Percy Jackson and the Olympians.

== Influences ==
In interviews with British Vogue and The Untitled Magazine, Keen cited Gena Rowlands, Meryl Streep, Olivia Colman, Jennifer Lawrence, and Timothée Chalamet as influences. Her favourite films include the musicals Singin' in the Rain (1952), Oklahoma! (1955) and West Side Story (1961), the comedies Some Like It Hot (1959) and Daddy's Home (2015), and the dramas A Woman Under the Influence (1974), Opening Night (1977) and In the Mood for Love (2000).

== Filmography ==
=== Film ===
Key
†	Denotes films that have not yet been released

List of film roles
Year	Title	Role	Notes	Ref.
2017	Logan	Laura / X-23		
2020	The New Mutants	Laura / X-23	Archive footage from Logan	
2020	Ana	Ana		
2024	Deadpool & Wolverine	Laura / X-23		
2025	Whistle	Chrysanthemum "Chrys" Willet		
TBA	The Marshmallow Experiment †	Kat Garcia	Post-production; also producer	
TBA	Night Comes †	TBA	Post-production	
TBA	Barracuda †	Jodie	Post-production	

=== Television ===
List of television appearances and roles
Year	Title	Role	Notes	Ref.
2014–2015	The Refugees	Ana "Ani" Cruz Oliver	Main role	
2019–2022	His Dark Materials	Lyra Belacqua	Lead role	
2024	Star Wars: The Acolyte	Jecki Lon	Main role	
2026	Percy Jackson and The Olympians	Artemis	Recurring role	

=== Podcast ===
- The Battersea Poltergeist (2021)

== Awards and nominations ==
List of awards and nominations received by Dafne Keen
Award	Year (Note: Indicates the year of ceremony. Each year is linked to the article about the awards held that year, wherever possible.)	Category	Nominated work	Result	Ref.
British Academy Cymru Awards	2020	Best Actress	His Dark Materials	Nominated	
Chicago Film Critics Association Awards	2017	Most Promising Performer	Logan	Nominated	
Critics' Choice Awards	2018	Best Young Performer	Logan	Nominated	
Dublin Film Critics' Circle Awards	2017	Breakthrough Artist of the Year	Logan	Nominated	
Empire Awards	2018	Best Female Newcomer	Logan	Won	
Hollywood Critics Association Awards	2017	Best Actor or Actress 23 and Under	Logan	Nominated	
Houston Film Critics Society Awards	2017	Best Supporting Actress	Logan	Nominated	
Las Vegas Film Critics Society Awards	2017	Youth in Film	Logan	Runner-up	
London Film Critics Circle Awards	2017	Young British/Irish Performer of the Year	Logan	Nominated	
MTV Movie & TV Awards	2017	Best Duo (Note: Shared with Hugh Jackman)	Logan	Won	
Online Film Critics Society Awards	2017	Best Breakout Star	Logan	Nominated	
Online Association of Female Film Critics Awards	2017	Best Breakthrough Performance	Logan	Won	
Online Film and Television Association Awards	2017	Best Youth Performance	Logan	Runner-up	
Online Film and Television Association Awards	2017	Best Breakthrough Performance: Female	Logan	Nominated	
Phoenix Film Critics Society Awards	2017	Best Performance by a Youth	Logan	Nominated	
Phoenix Film Critics Society Awards	2017	Breakthrough Performance	Logan	Nominated	
Saturn Awards	2018	Best Performance by a Younger Actor	Logan	Nominated	
Seattle Film Critics Society Awards	2017	Best Youth Performance	Logan	Nominated	
Washington D.C. Area Film Critics Association Awards	2017	Best Youth Performance	Logan	Nominated	
