= Logan (film) =

2017 film by James Mangold

- Theatrical release poster
- Directed by: James Mangold
- Screenplay by: Scott Frank; James Mangold; Michael Green
- Story by: James Mangold
- Based on: Wolverine by: Roy Thomas; Len Wein; John Romita Sr.
- Produced by: Hutch Parker; Simon Kinberg; Lauren Shuler Donner
- Starring: Hugh Jackman; Patrick Stewart; Richard E. Grant; Boyd Holbrook; Stephen Merchant; Dafne Keen
- Cinematography: John Mathieson
- Edited by: Michael McCusker; Dirk Westervelt
- Music by: Marco Beltrami
- Production companies: 20th Century Fox; Marvel Entertainment; Kinberg Genre; Hutch Parker Entertainment; The Donners' Company
- Distributed by: 20th Century Fox
- Release dates: February 17, 2017 (Berlinale); March 3, 2017 (United States)
- Running time: 137 minutes
- Country: United States
- Language: English
- Budget: $97–127 million
- Box office: $619.2 million

Logan is a 2017 American superhero film starring Hugh Jackman as the titular character. Based on the Marvel Comics character Wolverine, the film was directed by James Mangold, who co-wrote the screenplay with Michael Green and Scott Frank from a story by Mangold. It is the tenth installment in the X-Men film series, and the third Wolverine solo film following X-Men Origins: Wolverine (2009) and The Wolverine (2013). The film takes inspiration from the "Old Man Logan" comics storyline by Mark Millar and Steve McNiven and follows an aged Wolverine and an extremely ill Charles Xavier who must defend a young mutant named Laura from the Reavers led by Donald Pierce and Zander Rice. The film also stars Patrick Stewart, Richard E. Grant, Boyd Holbrook, and Stephen Merchant, with Dafne Keen making her film debut as Laura.

Discussion for the film began following the release of The Wolverine in 2013, with Mangold in negotiations to write the treatment for the film and Lauren Shuler Donner returning to produce. After updates followed that December to May 2016, principal photography began that May, and ended that August, mainly in Louisiana, New Mexico, and Mississippi. The film was designed to look like it takes place in the near future, with slight updates to technology and the social environment, with heavy influences from the Western genre, akin to a Neo-Western.

Logan premiered at the 67th Berlin International Film Festival on February 17, 2017, and was theatrically released in the United States on March 3. It was praised by critics for its action scenes, emotional depth, performances, and Mangold's direction, becoming the best-reviewed film in the X-Men franchise. The National Board of Review named Logan one of the top-ten films of 2017, and the film was also nominated for Best Adapted Screenplay at the 90th Academy Awards, becoming the first live-action superhero film to be nominated for screenwriting. Grossing $619.2 million worldwide, it became the third-highest-grossing R-rated film at its release. The Marvel Studios film Deadpool & Wolverine (2024) continues some storylines from Logan, with Jackman appearing as an alternate Logan and Keen reprising her role as Laura.

== Plot ==
In 2029, no mutants have been born in 25 years, and an aging Logan suffers as his healing ability is failing, slowly poisoned by his adamantium skeletal grafts. Working as a limousine driver in El Paso, Texas, he and the mutant tracker Caliban take care of the elderly Charles Xavier, in an abandoned smelting plant in northern Mexico. Xavier has dementia that causes him to have destructive telepathic seizures, one of which killed several of the X-Men years prior.

Logan reluctantly agrees to escort Gabriela López, a former nurse for biotechnology corporation Alkali-Transigen, and a young girl named Laura to Eden, a supposed refuge near the American-Canadian border, but finds Gabriela dead. Returning to the plant, Logan is confronted by Donald Pierce, Transigen's cyborg chief of security, the one who had killed Gabriela and was looking for Laura, who had stowed away in the back of Logan's limo and has powers similar to his. She, Logan, and Xavier escape from Pierce and his Reavers, but Caliban is captured. Pierce tortures Caliban into tracking Laura. Xavier and Logan watch a video on Gabriela's phone, revealing that Transigen created Laura and other children from mutant DNA to become weapons. The children proved challenging to control and were to be executed, but Gabriela and other nurses helped some escape. Xavier reveals to Logan that Laura was created from Logan's DNA and calls her Logan's daughter.

In Oklahoma City, Logan discovers that Eden appears in Laura's X-Men comic and tells her it is fictional. The Reavers arrive, but Xavier has a seizure that incapacitates everyone except Logan and Laura, who kill the mercenaries and inject Xavier with levetiracetam. As they flee, Dr. Zander Rice, the head of Transigen, arrives to help Pierce. Logan, Laura, and Xavier help farmer Will Munson and his family after a traffic incident, accepting an offer of dinner at their home, where Logan drives off enforcers from a corporate farm. Rice unleashes X-24, a violent, mindless feral clone of Logan in his prime created as Transigen's ultimate weapon. X-24 kills Xavier and Will's family before capturing Laura. Caliban sets off grenades, killing himself and several Reavers but only injuring Pierce. Logan is outmatched by X-24, but Will pins X-24 with his truck before dying from his injuries. Logan and Laura escape with Xavier's body. After burying Xavier, Logan passes out. Laura takes him to a doctor, where he partially recovers. Logan insists that the site in North Dakota is not Eden, but Laura does not relent and Logan agrees to take her there. They find Rictor and other Transigen children preparing to cross into Canada. Laura finds an adamantium bullet that Logan has kept since he escaped from the Weapon X facility, which he once considered using to commit suicide. Logan decides not to accompany them, to Laura's dismay.

When the Reavers ambush the children, Logan takes an overdose of a serum given to him by Rictor that temporarily enhances his healing abilities and boosts his strength. With Laura's help, he slaughters most of the Reavers before the serum wears off. As Pierce holds Rictor at gunpoint, Rice tells Logan, who killed Rice's father years ago at the Weapon X facility, that no new mutants have been born in the USA due to genetically engineered crops created by Transigen and distributed through the food supply. Logan, having found a gun, shoots Rice dead and injures Pierce. X-24 fights Logan as the children combine their powers to kill Pierce and the remaining Reavers. Rictor uses his powers to flip a truck onto X-24, but X-24 frees himself and impales Logan on a large tree branch, mortally wounding him. Laura loads Logan's revolver with the adamantium bullet and shoots X-24 in the head, killing him.

Near death, Logan tells Laura not to become the weapon she was made to be, and after she tearfully acknowledges him as her father, Logan dies peacefully in Laura's arms. She and the children bury Logan, with Laura reciting as his eulogy the closing speech from Shane, which she and Xavier had watched in the Oklahoma City hotel. Before the children depart, Laura tilts the Cross on his grave marker to create an "X".

== Cast ==
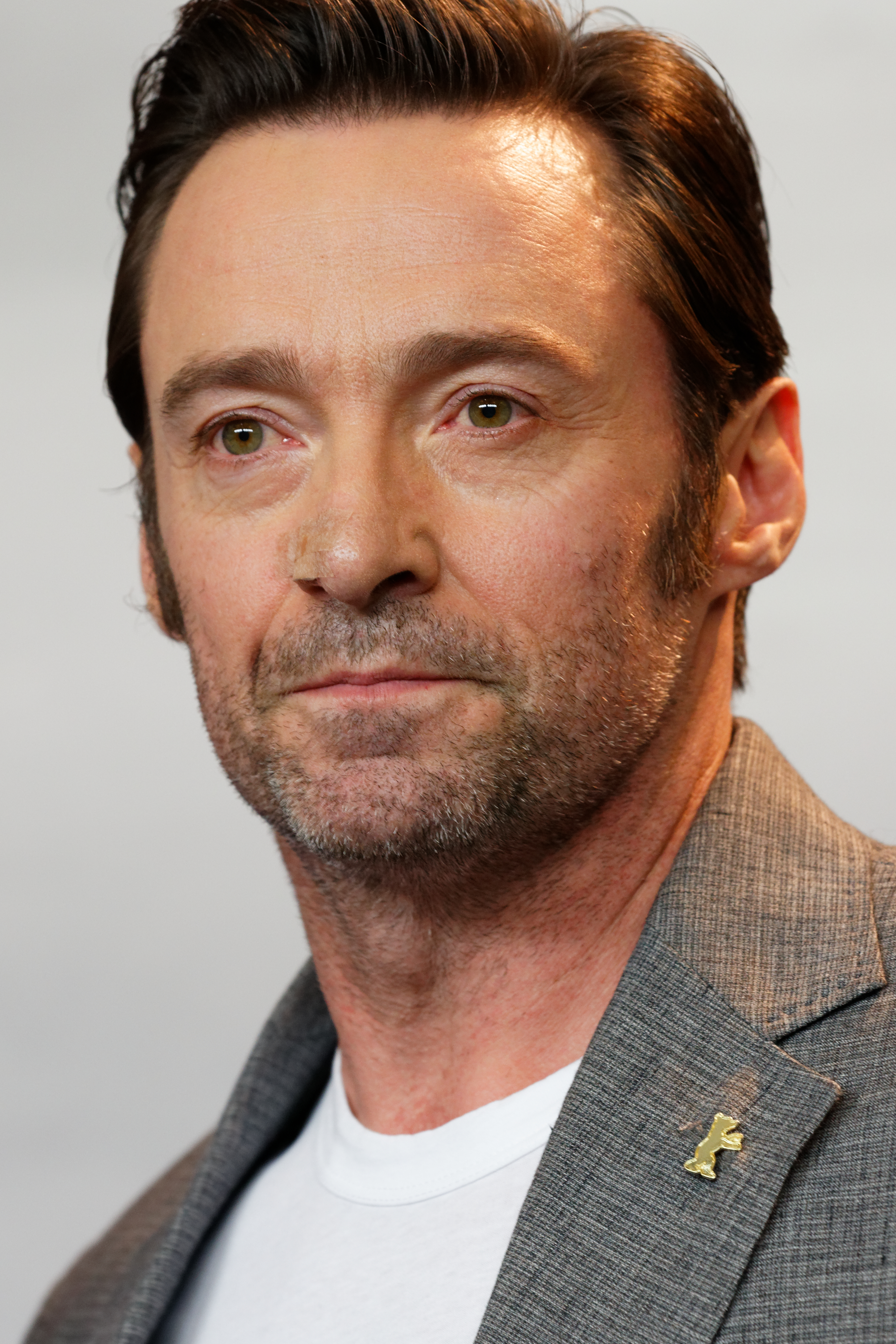
Hugh Jackman's portrayal of Wolverine for 17 years in nine films earned him the Guinness World Records title for "longest career as a live-action Marvel superhero" in 2019.

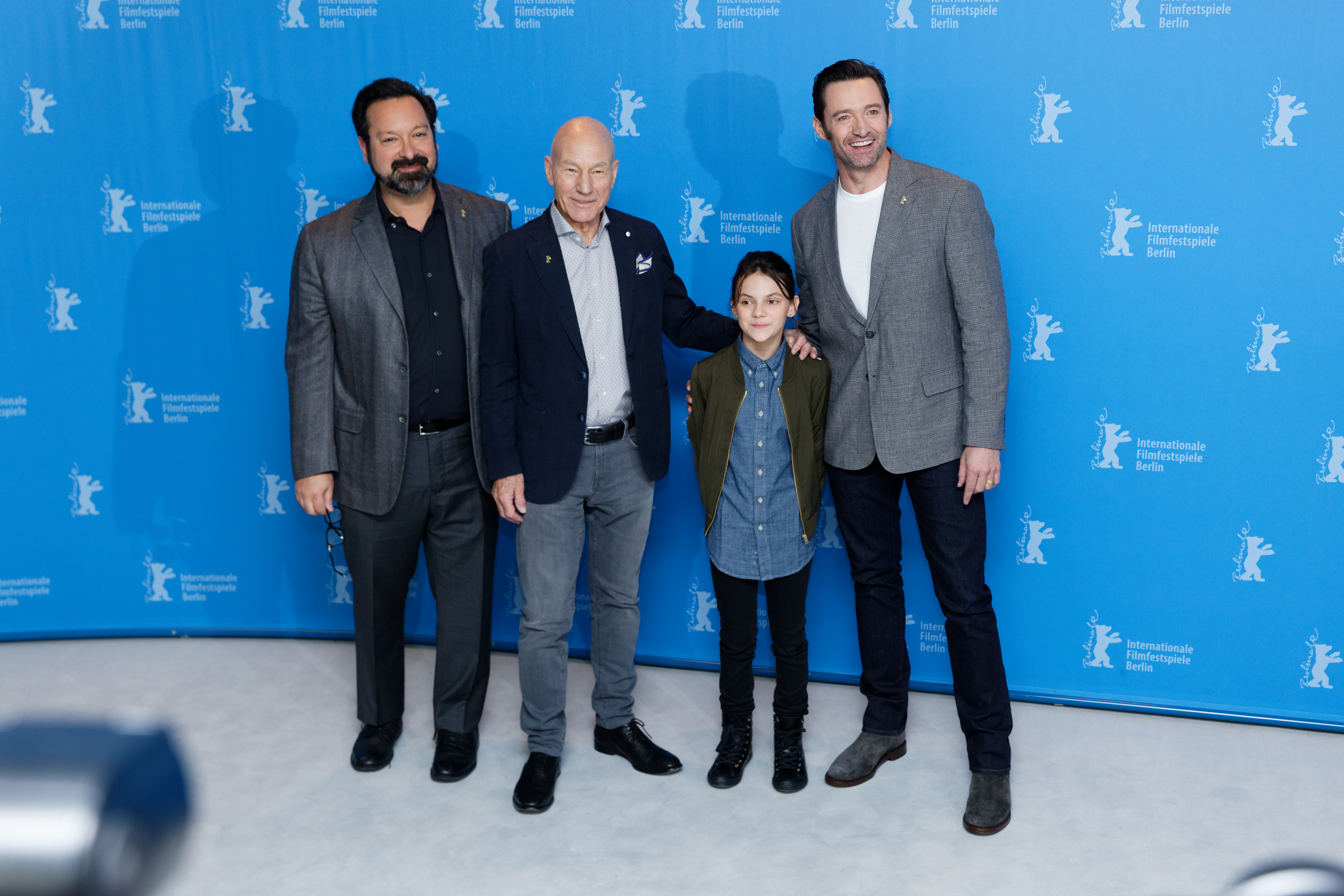
(left to right) Director James Mangold with Patrick Stewart, Dafne Keen and Hugh Jackman.

- Hugh Jackman as James Howlett / Logan:
  A former member of the X-Men and a physically enhanced mutant with accelerated healing. Charles Xavier's former pupil and Laura's genetical father, dealing with his age and ailment. He is one of Charles Xavier's caregivers, alongside Caliban. Mangold spoke of Logan's age influencing his regenerative capabilities, which he stated may no longer produce soft skin, "so we imagined he heals quickly, still, but it leaves a scar. The simple idea was that his body would start to get a little more ravaged with a kind of tattooing of past battles, lacerations that remain of previous conflicts." On the second page of the screenplay, Mangold spoke of Logan as "... he's older now and it's clear his abilities aren't what they once were. He's fading on the inside and his diminished healing factor keeps him in a constant state of chronic pain—hence booze as a painkiller." In 2015, Jackman requested fan input for the direction Wolverine's story should go in the next film while seeming to confirm that the project would serve as his farewell to Logan. To prepare for his role, Jackman ate a minimum of six meals per day when working with trainer Mike Ryan. Ryan stated that an average workout session for Jackman lasts up to three hours, beginning at 4:00 a.m. Jackman stated, "It's going to be very different. Very different in tone and hopefully different to anything we've done." Regarding the more personal tone, Jackman noted, "That's always been really his dilemma, coming to terms with who he is". Jackman has also explained that comedian Jerry Seinfeld was indirectly responsible for his decision to stop playing Logan after 17 years, with Jackman stating, "I was having a chat with [Seinfeld] about a year ago ... he was talking about why he finished Seinfeld ... He said he'd always had this feeling and belief that you never know when either your energy or the audience's energy is going to dip over into people [saying] 'Oh, please go.'" Jackman accepted a pay reduction to ensure that the film would be produced to receive an R-rating. Additionally, Jackman portrays Logan's clone, X-24.
- Patrick Stewart as Charles Xavier:
  A mutant who is the world's most powerful telepath, the founder and former leader of the now-defunct X-Men and formerly known as Professor X. Charles's telepathic abilities have become unstable due to age (over 90 years) and an unknown brain disease, and at times, he does not recognize Logan. During the events of Logan, Xavier is cared for by Logan and Caliban. Regarding Xavier and the themes of aging and loneliness, Mangold said, "We've seen these characters in action, saving the universe. But what happens when you're in retirement and that career is over? ... The really interesting thing to me, or a place to dig that hadn't been dug, was the idea of mutants when they're no longer useful to the world, or even sure if they can do what they used to do. Their powers are diminished like all of ours are by age ... Our Charles is a very sweet character in this film. I think he's always been an incredibly sweet character. With the addition of his own physical fragility in this movie, he becomes an incredibly powerful paternal figure in the movie. Logan is more of a reluctant one, I think you can easily guess." Stewart remarked that "... this is probably the end of this franchise for me. But the thing about science fiction and fantasy is that you can never, ever say it's the end, it's over."
- Richard E. Grant as Dr. Zander Rice:
  The surgical head of Transigen, whose father was killed by Logan during his escape from the Weapon X Headquarters at Alkali Lake. On the character of Rice, Mangold stated, "He's the puppet master behind Pierce and the Reavers, and has a much larger role in the sense that he's actually the kind of brilliant mind that is trying to grow mutants."
- Boyd Holbrook as Donald Pierce:
  Transigen's relentless, calculating, and intense head of security and leader of the militant Reavers, who is sent to retrieve Laura, which brings him into conflict with Wolverine. Holbrook said of the character, "He's an innovative engineer and he's a big fan of Wolverine. He just wants to hang out with him ... There's a lot of surprising stuff in it." Mangold praised Holbrook's performance, saying that "[he] is just a fabulous actor. I wanted this film to feel intimate and real and truthfully acted, and I wanted very much to break away from the kind of bloated feeling I've gotten from a lot of comic-book movies."
- Stephen Merchant as Caliban:
  An albino mutant who can sense and track other mutants, who is helping Logan take care of Xavier. On Merchant taking the role, Mangold mentioned, "I'm always interested to find the thing that looks most interesting on the actors. Stephen is a huge man. One of the things that is so wonderful filming with him for a character like this is that he's a good six inches taller than Logan, and huge over Patrick. The little kid in the movie would come up to basically his knee. So there's a wonderful sense of scale—but he has heart too." Mangold concluded by stating, "... So that was a wonderful energy to enter the movie, and someone who instead of turning things into their own energy kind of joined ours." A different version of Caliban was previously portrayed by Tómas Lemarquis in X-Men: Apocalypse.
- Dafne Keen as Laura / X-23:
  A mysterious young girl who is "very much" like Logan as well as his biological daughter. On Keen's portrayal of Laura, Mangold mentioned, "If anyone could steal a movie from [Jackman], it would be Dafne. She carries, all the time, a slight strangeness." In an interview with Digital Spy, Mangold stated, "... [Keen] was 11 years old when we were shooting. She's a remarkable kid. Her parents are actors, and she's kind of a very modern kid. Very physically capable. Incredibly gifted as an actress. I mean, it was a huge risk for Fox to allow me to make a movie where the third point of the triangle was built upon someone so young." Mangold stated that the worldwide search for an actress to portray Laura was one in which he was seeking "someone who was bilingual because I wanted a Latina kid—one who was between 10 and 12, and was a credible child." He later stated of Laura that: "She's an 11-year-old girl equipped with all the volatility, instability, mood swings, shadows and potential violence of our hero." Co-writer Scott Frank pushed for the character to speak as little as possible when he joined the project to avoid making her into a typical kid sidekick, explaining, "I read a few other drafts of the script that Jim worked on, and in all those drafts she was talking from the beginning and had an attitude. I thought that was a giant mistake." 11-year-old Nayah Murphy served as Dafne's stunt double. Millie Bobby Brown auditioned for the role before Keen was cast. Logan was Keen's film debut.

Eriq La Salle, Elise Neal, and Elizabeth Rodriguez appear as Will Munson, Kathryn Munson, and Gabriela, respectively. Doris Morgado, David Kallaway, Han Soto, Jason Genao, Krzysztof Soszynski, and Alison Fernandez appear as Maria, Rhodes, Valet, Rictor, Mohawk, and Delilah, respectively. In the commentary to X-Men: Apocalypse, director Bryan Singer had stated that his film's post-credits scene would directly connect with the on-screen debut of X-Men antagonist Mister Sinister in the third, then untitled Wolverine movie. In January 2017, Mangold stated that the character Mr. Sinister would not appear in his film.

== Production ==
=== Development ===
Hugh and I have been talking about what we would do since we were working on the last one, and for both of us it was this requirement that, to be even interested in doing it, we had to free ourselves from some assumptions that had existed in the past, and be able to change the tone a bit. Not merely to change for change's sake, but also to make something that's speaking to the culture now, that's not just the same style—how many times can they save the world in one way or another? How can we construct a story that's built more on character and character issues, in a way as if it almost wasn't a superhero movie, yet it features their powers and struggles and themes?

— James Mangold, on the development and approach of Logan

In November 2013, 20th Century Fox initiated discussions over another solo film starring Wolverine, with James Mangold in negotiations to write the treatment for the film and Lauren Shuler Donner returning to produce under The Donners' Company. At the time, Hugh Jackman neither confirmed nor denied his reprisal of Logan in a new film. Jackman clarified that his lapsing contract with Fox, which reportedly would need to be renegotiated after X-Men: Days of Future Past (2014), did not mean he was leaving the franchise, as he had been working movie-by-movie since X2 (2003). He also stated, "I do want to do it with Jim and with [producer] Lauren Shuler-Donner because we had such a great experience. I'm really proud of The Wolverine (2013)". Later in the month, Mangold announced that the pre-production aspect of the film had not yet begun, nor the writing process, though he furthered this by stating, "... I would say I'm not there yet. But I have taken finger to key. Let's say that. There's been typing. And ideas. And talking amongst all the principles".

Shortly after the release of The Wolverine, Mangold spoke of a potential sequel with the aim of not converting it into a "Will the world survive?" film, while also stressing his need "... not to make the same picture again". In December 2013, Jackman spoke of nearing the end of his tenure as the character, while stating that the film was in the very early stages of development. Jackman also revealed that Mangold and he had begun speaking of potential ideas, adding, "... Jim Mangold and I were literally on the phone last night talking about ideas but there is no script and no writer yet so it's a way off". Mangold would later reveal that Jackman was very involved in developing the story, saying, "Hugh and I have been friends for almost twenty years now, and he was there every step of the way. For Hugh and I, the first goal was to construct something more intimate. Hugh often brought up The Wrestler (2008) and Unforgiven (1992) as examples. I used those references as well as others. I pitched to both Hugh and the studio that I had an idea for an extremely bloody, existential Little Miss Sunshine (2006)".

By March 2014, a decision was made to begin shooting after Bryan Singer's X-Men: Apocalypse (2016), with the tentative plan to shoot the films back-to-back, with producer Hutch Parker stating, "... the goal will be X-Men: Apocalypse for 2016, which means at the latest [filming begins] in summer 2015, and then the same thing with Wolverine, either before or after, but based on the script". Also in March, 20th Century Fox set a release date of March 3, 2017, Mangold boarded the project as director, Jackman signed on to reprise his role, and David James Kelly was hired to pen the screenplay. In April 2014, Jackman spoke about his ambitious feelings for the character of Logan while mentioning that they can go further than what they achieved in The Wolverine. Jackman also expressed his feelings of finality with portraying the character of Logan, while in terms of storyline, he explained that nothing had been decided as of yet. Jackman concluded by highlighting that the success of the script development would determine whether Jackman would return at all: "I haven't signed on. I'm genuinely at that point where unless it's better than the last one I'm not going to do it. I think it has to be better. I can still see where we can improve on the last one. I love the intimacy of that story, I liked the small stuff, I liked that it was a little unexpected".

In February 2015, Patrick Stewart spoke of discussions about the third Wolverine film, centering around a team-up between Jackman's Wolverine and himself as Charles Xavier, with Stewart stating to Marc Mohan that "... we have been talking about a Wolverine movie, which would team Hugh Jackman and myself together ... That would be a very different sort of X-Men from the four movies that I've already done". By April 2015, Michael Green had taken over screenwriting duties, with Mangold still actively overseeing the script development process. In September 2015, Jackman spoke of the writers being halfway through the script, and that the story would delve into the relationship between Wolverine and Professor X, to which he added, "I think it's a really important relationship but I want to see signs of that quasi-father/son sort of relationship that has not been seen before, and sides of particularly Professor X that have not been seen before". Jackman spoke of Mangold's plan to start filming the next year, though he expressed uncertainty as to filming locations. Also in September, Mark Millar, creative consultant for Fox, confirmed that Mangold's film would be a loose adaptation of the "Old Man Logan" story he had written in 2008, something that was hinted at earlier by Jackman. In October 2016, the title of the film was announced as Logan.

In January 2016, Jackman confirmed that Mangold had a full screenplay, albeit not complete. The following month, Liev Schreiber expressed interest in returning to portray Victor Creed / Sabretooth, with Jackman himself mentioning Mangold's vision to Schreiber. After the film's release, it was revealed by Jackman that originally the script had the character play a role in the film, but that Sabretooth was excluded from the final screenplay. By April 2016, Mangold had chosen Boyd Holbrook to portray the main antagonist of the movie, the chief of security for a global corporation that is pursuing Wolverine. Also by April, Richard E. Grant was cast as a villainous mad scientist, and Stephen Merchant had also been cast. In May, Eriq Lasalle and Elise Neal were cast supporting roles, and Elizabeth Rodriguez entered negotiations for a small but key role. Mangold felt Dafne Keen was a perfect choice for X-23 after seeing her audition tape, but Fox wanted to continue the casting process, so Mangold brought Stewart to see Keen's tape and he praised her and he had Jackman to read with her. Millie Bobby Brown also screen-tested for the part. Also in May, producer Simon Kinberg revealed that filming had already begun, and confirmed that the movie would be R-rated; regarding the setting and tonality, he stated, "It takes place in the future, and as you and others have reported, it is an R-rated movie. It's violent, it's kind of like a western in its tone. It's just a very cool, different film". Jackman wanted the film's ending be like Unforgiven, but Mangold was keen to do the ending where Logan dies.

The film included some vintage X-Men comic books, used both to advance the plot and as a metafictional reference. The director clarified that Marvel Comics allowed this on the condition that they could use actual characters and designs, but not use any real comic book issues. As a result, the comic book covers and pages seen in the film were made specifically for it, by writer Joe Quesada and artist Dan Panosian. Mangold commented that "The reality was that, like in Unforgiven, when [Clint] Eastwood runs into Richard Harris, who's writing these fictional accounts of the great Western heroes, or Pat Garrett in Billy the Kid, where you've got these aging heroes who kind of are twilight versions of their own legends — I think that idea, of being a kind of celebrity, or like a sports star long past your heyday, was really interesting for me to investigate with this kind of world". Panosian made 10 fake comic book covers, and interior arts were unused. He pointed that the arts had to resemble the style used in the Bronze Age of Comic Books, and pointed out that they also served to contrast their campy style with the darker tone of the live-action film itself. He said that "The colors and art itself juxtaposed against the raw and savage world in the film capture just how much innocence has been lost over time".

Regarding the film's place in the continuity of the X-Men series, the production made a conscious effort for it to be as standalone as possible, and not intermingle with previous films. Jackman stated "Not only is it standalone in terms of timeline and tone, it's a slightly different universe. It's actually a different paradigm and that will become clear." Mangold further commented "I gave them many escape valves. We take place in 2029, and X-Men [Days of Future Past] ends in 2024. There's five blank years there that are wide open to seeing how things got from here to there. Or else you could do what I would advocate, which is imagine a different world and create a new movie, and you don't need the permission of the other movies."

=== Filming ===
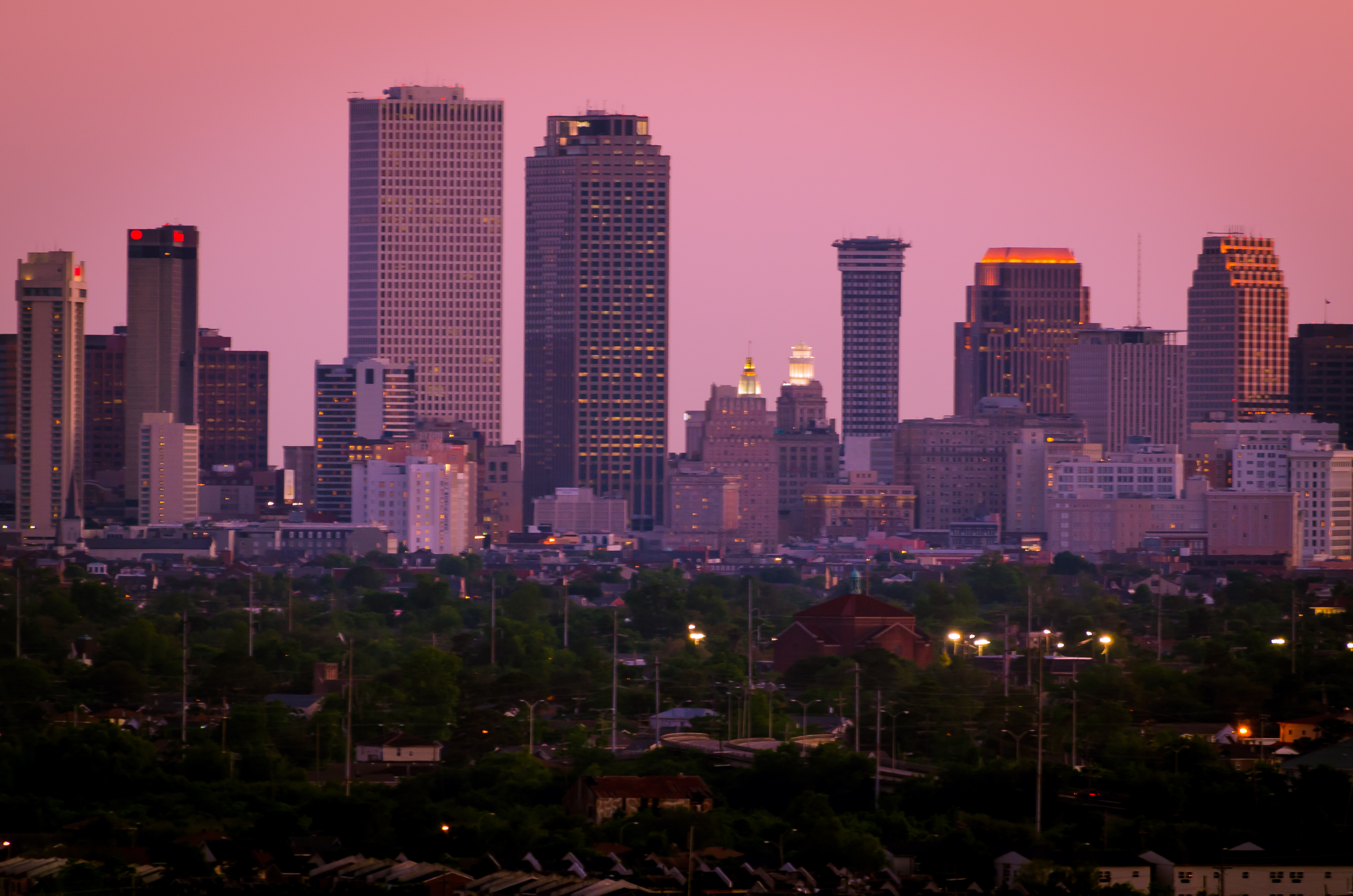
Principal photography for Logan took place in New Orleans, Louisiana.

On March 5, 2015, James Mangold anticipated that filming would begin "early next year". Prior to filming, the film was given the false title of Juarez to lower the visibility of production, but the local media eventually uncovered the ruse. On March 1, 2016, The Times-Picayune had confirmed that Mangold's film was preparing to shoot in New Orleans, Louisiana, with a starting schedule of May. Producers Kinberg, Shuler Donner and Parker chose to film in Louisiana because of its popularity in filmmaking locations, as well as its filming incentive, which includes a 40% tax credit for movie productions, though it requires a minimum expenditure of US$300,000. Principal photography was confirmed to have begun in New Orleans, with an original shooting schedule occurring from April 25 to August 13, 2016, albeit shooting was altered to start on May 2, 2016.

On May 23, 2016, filming took place at the NASA Michoud Plant in New Orleans East, with Jackman being spotted, not far from Slidell, shooting a fight scene outdoors on the property. On May 26, 2016, the intersection of LA 16 at US 51 was closed for a time due to filming, with local store fronts donning faux signage to transform Amite City, and east of Amite near Bell Road. It was revealed that scenes were filmed prior in Husser on May 25, 2016, with a scheduled daytime shoot to occur at the Greenlawn Cemetery in Hammond on May 27, 2016. Filming took place from June 9, 2016, until June 10, 2016, in New Orleans and Metairie, respectively.

On June 1, 2016, it was confirmed that 20th Century Fox had applied to film exterior scenes for Juarez on Louisiana Highway 15 between Ferriday and Clayton from June 12, 2016, up until June 16, 2016, at the Ferriday Plaza Shopping Center, while a portion of U.S. Route 425 between Ferriday and Clayton would be closed for a five-day period in connection with Fox's production. On June 1, 2016, The Concordia Sentinel revealed that Sicily Island High School and a house in Sicily Island would be used in the production, while a crash scene would be shot on U.S. Route 425 just outside of Ferriday. Producers Kinberg, Shuler Donner and Parker chose to film in Ferriday, Louisiana, because of Concordia Parish's beautiful countryside and green cornfields. On June 16, 2016, Juarez was originally scheduled to move on toward Sicily Island, however, additional periods of shooting were added. Natchez, Mississippi, had been chosen by producers of Juarez as the next filming location, for an upcoming scene which required the casting truck drivers, that would be filmed between June 14 up until June 28, 2016.

On July 12, 2016, the Albuquerque Journal confirmed that Juarez would move on to its third major filming location—New Mexico, which ran through August in Albuquerque, Rio Rancho, Abiquiú, Tierra Amarilla and Chama. The New Mexico Film Office revealed that the production employed about 130 New Mexican crew members and two New Mexican cast members, as well as 600 extras throughout the production, the film office stated. On July 17, 2016, it was reported that the production of Juarez was in the process of casting to work on a scene filmed on July 22, 2016, in Albuquerque, New Mexico. On July 25, 2016, it was reported that filming had begun in the Northern Meadows neighborhood of Rio Rancho, while a few miles further down King Boulevard there was an elaborate set built with a toppled water tower, that would be used for exterior shots until June 27, 2016. On August 11, 2016, it was reported that the production of Juarez were in the process of seeking worn out cars to work on an upcoming scene filmed on August 12, 2016, in Albuquerque, New Mexico. Principal photography was confirmed to have ended in New Mexico on August 13, 2016, with an altered shooting schedule occurring from May 2 to August 13, 2016. Post-production began subsequent to filming closure on August 23, 2016.

=== Post-production ===
Hugh Jackman as Logan, with makeup and visual special effects

Film editor Michael McCusker was finishing work on Mangold's Logan, during the period of October 7, 2016, wherein he spoke of going through the dailies and breaking them down, and figuring out the structure of one scene which he described as a "complicated, multi-component scene". McCusker spoke of the task being rather time-consuming, on the front end, albeit stating, "I am looking at the back end experience with [Mangold] as the more important experience. I don't want to be searching for stuff for him, I want to be working towards getting the cut right". McCusker concluded by stating that another editor on Logan has use for post-production. Chas Jarrett was the overall visual effects supervisor and visual effects company Image Engine worked on most of the visual effects on Logan.

== Music ==
In July 2016, Cliff Martinez was announced as the composer of Logan's musical score. In December 2016, Mangold announced that Marco Beltrami, who had previously collaborated with Mangold on 3:10 to Yuma (2007) and The Wolverine (2013), would take over from Martinez and score Logan instead.

Beltrami's musical score received critical acclaim, praising the composition and the minimalistic approach. Jonathan Broxton, in his critical review, wrote "there will be a significant disconnect between it and those who grew up listening to Michael Kamen, John Ottman, and John Powell's X-Men scores, because Beltrami's Logan is just so different from anything we have heard in a super-hero movie before. On the one hand, this is commendable; bucking expectations and taking an entirely new approach to a well-defined musical genre is not an easy thing to do, but that's exactly what Beltrami has done here. On the other hand, listeners will still need to be comfortable with music that shifts between being dissonant, ambient, and jazzy, and which has more in common with the work of Ennio Morricone, Jerry Fielding, Elliot Goldenthal, and Bernard Herrmann, than anyone who has scored a super-hero movie before. If you're cool with that, then Logan will find a way to at least entertain you and allow you to experience its unusual tonal palette. If not, then you may find yourself recoiling in horror like Caliban from the sun, or experiencing a psychic attack of your own."

== Influences ==
The film takes visual, tonal and thematic inspiration from classic western and noir cinema, with director James Mangold having stated that Logan's influences included "visual reference points" of cinema, citing Shane (1953), The Cowboys (1972), Paper Moon (1973), The Gauntlet (1977), Unforgiven (1992), Little Miss Sunshine (2006), and The Wrestler (2008). Mangold was also inspired by The Dark Knight trilogy, saying "It seemed to me that the only films of this ilk that did interest me, that I did admire, or to use Chris Nolan's movies as an example, the ones that have really moved me beyond just the spectacle. There was a very clear decision to apply a film genre to the material, if that makes any sense."" The film also takes tropes and themes of the cyberpunk, with focus put on automation affecting the world of a near future.

Mangold spoke of visual framing, while noting that he does not necessarily think about the "comic-book" related sort, instead highlighting the variety of stylistic influences that went into Logan. These influences include film noir framings and classic Hollywood filmmaking styles, as well as the Germanic expressionist filmmaking style of the early twentieth century, which Mangold stated has a commonality with comic-book art. Mangold highlighted "Strong foregrounds, playing things in depth: you have to make an image say more within that one image."

Using the image of Logan at a funeral as an example of his stylistic logic, Mangold concluded by mentioning the aspects within modern filmmaking, primarily everything in close-up format. For Logan, his aim was to set frames that are descriptive, and evocative of comic-book panels and classical filmmaking.

== Release ==
=== Theatrical ===
Logan premiered at the 67th Berlin International Film Festival on February 17, 2017, in Berlin, Germany, where it was selected to be screened out of competition alongside The Bar, Final Portrait, The Midwife, T2 Trainspotting, and Viceroy's House, before screening in the United States, where it was given a wide release on March 3, 2017. In October 2015, Fox confirmed that Logan would be released in the IMAX format. In the United States, Canada and the United Kingdom, the film was preceded by a short film, Deadpool: No Good Deed. In it, Deadpool notices a man getting robbed, and springs into action—but first has to change into his costume in a phone booth. As he is finishing up, the man is shot; the short film ends with Deadpool commenting on the strangeness of the phone booth's presence, and eating the man's ice cream. The teaser met with positive reviews. Ryan Reynolds posted an extended version of the teaser via his YouTube channel the day after the film's release.

=== One Last Time promotion and future ===
Prior to the confirmation that the then-untitled Logan would be his final appearance in the X-Men film franchise, Jackman initially denied such rumors. Jackman stated that he was inspired by Michael Keaton's performance in Birdman, and wished to portray the character of Wolverine until his death. In July 2015, Jackman posted an image of Logan giving the middle finger with a claw to his Twitter. The image, coupled with the hashtag "#OneLastTime", signified that the film would be his last appearance as Logan and officially announced his decision to stop playing the character he had been portraying for the past 17 years. Eventually it earned Jackman the Guinness World Record of the 'longest career as a live-action Marvel superhero'.

During an appearance on The Dr. Oz Show in May 2015, Jackman clarified the confusion over the conflicting sentiments by stating bluntly that the film would be his final portrayal of the character. In an interview with Willem Dafoe on Variety Studio: Actors on Actors Jackman revealed that Jerry Seinfeld helped convince him to quit the role during a dinner after Jackman asked him why he had decided to end the show Seinfeld. Seinfeld replied "I've always believed, you should never spend everything creatively because it's almost herculean to start up again. You should always have something in the tank," with Jackman summarising his point with "Leave the party before it gets too late kind of theory."

In December 2016, Ryan Reynolds revealed that he had been trying to convince Jackman to return for a crossover Deadpool film, urging fans to "convince Hugh" and campaign online. In January 2017, Reynolds and Jackman spoke about the proposed project; Jackman stated, "I'm hesitating, because I could totally see how that's the perfect fit. But the timing may be wrong." Jackman later stated that he would not reprise the role for a team-up film, specifying that he "knew two-and-a-half years ago that [Logan] was the last one".

Jackman expressed interest in continuing to play Wolverine had the character been brought into the Marvel Cinematic Universe, saying that the prospect "certainly would have made [him] pause" and citing a desire to see the character interact with the Hulk and Iron Man. Amid rumors of Disney's prospective acquisition of 20th Century Fox's film division, it was revealed such a deal would indeed allow the X-Men related characters to appear in the Marvel Cinematic Universe. During press for The Greatest Showman in December 2017, Jackman denied that he would reprise the role if the acquisition occurred. He stated that while he noted the irony and felt some initial disappointment upon learning the news, he planned on standing by his decision and wanted to see another actor portray the character in future films.

In spite of his adamancy, Reynolds confirmed that Jackman would reprise his role as Logan in Deadpool & Wolverine (2024) on September 27, 2022. Released on July 26, 2024, the film saw the characters integrated into the multiversal continuity of the MCU. The following month, Jackman elaborated that he wanted to return to the role after watching Deadpool, but since Logan was already being promoted as his final time portraying the character, he felt he had to honor that sentiment and "straight-up lied" to journalists about his plans. He contacted Reynolds about reprising the role in August 2022, shortly before Reynolds met with Marvel Studios president Kevin Feige to discuss a third Deadpool film. Shortly after the announcement, Reynolds and Jackman clarified that the film is set "before" Logan and would not retroactively contradict Wolverine's death.

As for the other principals and their prospective futures; although Patrick Stewart had stated that Logan would be the final time he played the role of Professor X, he later said that he would be willing to return to the role in Deadpool 2 or Legion. Though Legion's producers considered casting Stewart, they ultimately chose to utilize a younger version of the character portrayed by actor Harry Lloyd. Nonetheless, Stewart would go on to portray the character again in the MCU film Doctor Strange in the Multiverse of Madness, where he played a variant of Charles Xavier who was the leader of the Illuminati before being killed by Wanda Maximoff. He also reprised the role of Xavier in the MCU crossover film Avengers: Doomsday along with other past X-Men characters.

=== Marketing ===
In April 2016, Fox decided not to showcase its upcoming movie releases, including Logan, at Hall H at San Diego Comic-Con, as the studio felt it could not prevent the piracy of custom trailers and exclusive footage routinely screened for fans in attendance.

On October 20, 2016, 20th Century Fox released a 90-second teaser trailer to promote Logan, following a six-second sneak peek the prior day. Later that day, 20th Century Fox released an international red band version of the trailer, featuring slightly more graphic violence than the original. Empire chose the trailer as the best trailer of the year. The Hollywood Reporter's Aaron Couch praised the trailer, and stated, "If Logan delivers on the promise of this trailer, it will be a true rarity in modern superhero movie making." James Dyer of Empire heralded the trailer and its director, James Mangold, by stating: "We've had a veritable feast of great trailers ... from John Wick to Rogue One, Assassin's Creed and A Cure for Wellness. But none ..., no matter how impressive, have been quite so artfully constructed as this glorious first look at [Mangold]'s Logan." Forrest Wickman of Slate called the trailer "surprisingly mournful".

=== Home media ===
Logan was released on Blu-ray, DVD, and 4K on May 23, 2017, and was released on Digital HD on May 16, 2017. The film became available to stream on Disney+ on July 22, 2022, alongside Deadpool and Deadpool 2.

=== Logan Noir ===
Prior to the release of Logan Noir, 20th Century Fox promoted Logan with a black-and-white social photography campaign released through social media, including the WponX Instagram account. The campaign included photography by Dean Bradshaw and formed part of the studio's broader Logan Campaign, which won Gold at the 2017 Clio Entertainment Awards in the Theatrical: Integrated Campaign category. Clio credits for the campaign listed 20th Century Fox vice president Jeffrey Kelly among the credited studio executives. Entertainment coverage at the time noted that the black-and-white imagery became a distinctive part of the film's marketing and generated fan speculation that the film itself might be released in black and white.

On April 29, 2017, James Mangold announced that a black-and-white version of the film entitled Logan Noir would have a limited theatrical run in U.S. theaters, an event set to begin on May 16, 2017. Mangold stated that Logan was shot as a color film with the awareness that it would play well as a black and white film. The film was re-graded and timed shot by shot for the Noir edition. This version of the film is included on the Digital HD release and also included in the DVD and Blu-ray Combo Pack.

== Reception ==
=== Box office ===
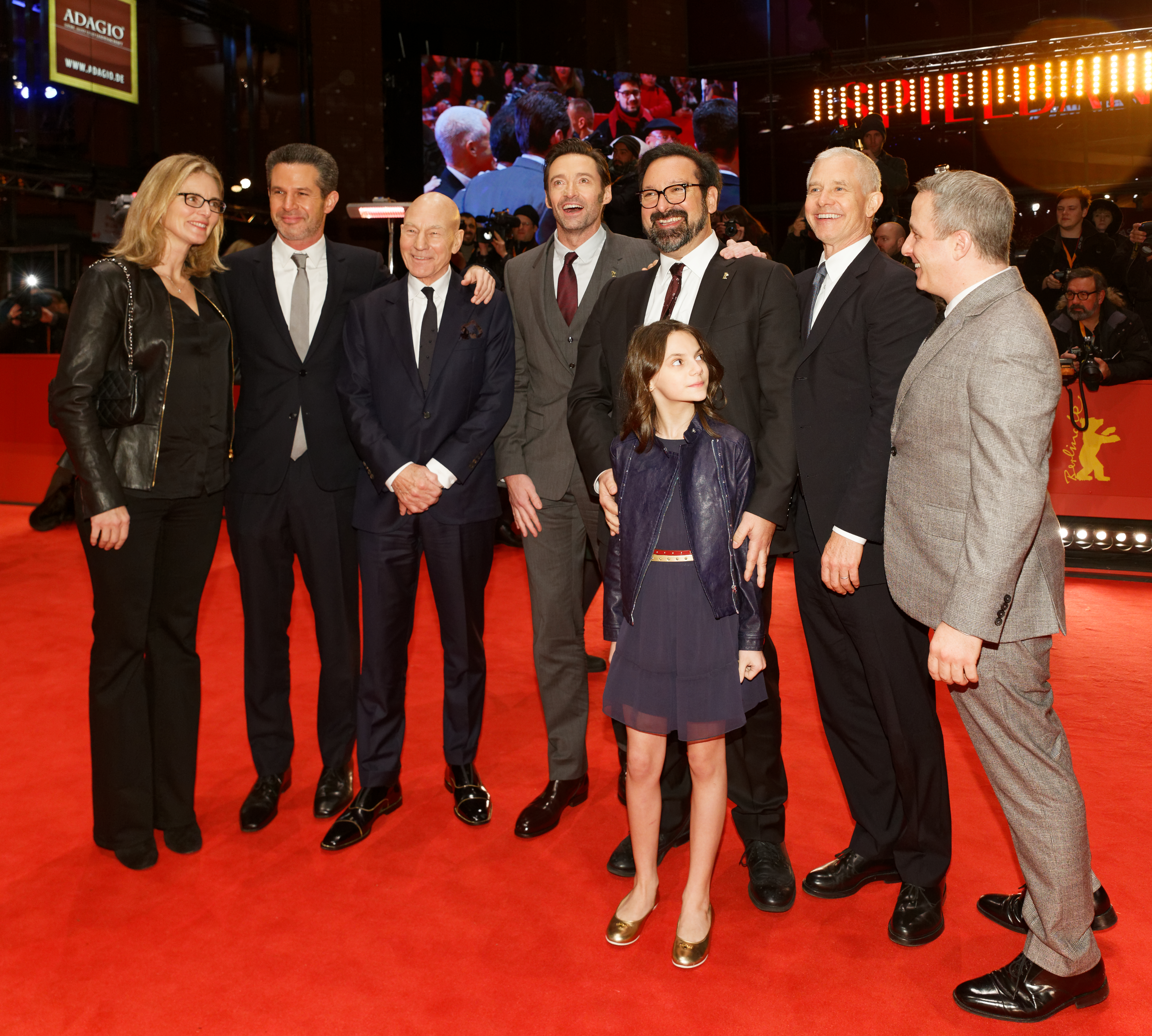
Cast and crew members at the Berlin International Film Festival for the film's premiere in February 2017.

Logan grossed $226.3 million in the United States and Canada and $392.7 million in other countries for a worldwide gross of $619.2 million, against a production budget of $97 million. Worldwide, the film had a global debut of $247.4 million from 82 markets, as well as the second-biggest R-rated IMAX debut, with $20.6 million from 1,068 screens. The film grossed $440.9 million in its first 13 days of release, surpassing the entire theatrical gross of The Wolverine ($414.8 million).

==== United States and Canada ====
Predictions for its opening in the US and Canada were revised upwards from $55 million to $80 million or even higher. Fox, however, predicted an opening in the mid-$60 million range. Some critics said the film's R rating—the second such for a X-Men film—might hinder the film's mass appeal. Two days before the film's release, ticket selling site Fandango reported that the film was outpacing all previous X-Men movies (except Deadpool) at the same point in their sales cycle.

Logan was released in 4,071 theaters, the widest release for an R-rated film, breaking American Sniper's previous record of 3,888 theaters. Five hundred and eighty theatres were premium large-format screens, including 381 IMAX theaters, setting the IMAX record for an R-rated film.

Logan earned $9.5 million from Thursday night previews, which began at 7 p.m. This marked the second-biggest previews in the X-Men franchise, behind Deadpool's $12.7 million. On its opening day, the film scored the biggest R-rated March opening with $33.1 million, breaking 300's previous record, as well as the third-biggest R-rated opening day, after Deadpool ($47.3 million) and The Matrix Reloaded ($37.5 million). Earning a total of $88.4 million during its opening weekend, the film scored the biggest Wolverine movie opening, the biggest R-rated March opening, the fourth-biggest March opening weekend behind Batman v Superman: Dawn of Justice ($166 million), The Hunger Games ($152.5 million) and Alice in Wonderland ($116.1 million), the fifth-largest X-Men opening, and the fourth-biggest R-rated opening weekend overall (ninth in terms of inflation adjusted) behind Deadpool ($132.4 million), The Matrix Reloaded ($91.7 million) and American Sniper ($89.2 million). This made it the highest opening weekend for a 2017 film at the time of its release, surpassing The Lego Batman Movie ($53 million). It was also the biggest R-rated opening weekend that did not take place on a holiday. Additionally, Logan achieved the fifth-highest opening weekend for any 20th Century Fox film, trailing only behind Deadpool ($132.4 million), Star Wars: Episode III – Revenge of the Sith ($108.4 million), X-Men: The Last Stand ($102.7 million) and X-Men: Days of Future Past ($90.8 million). About 8.2% of the total ticket sales were in Canada, with premium large formats comprising $12.3 million (15%) from 558 screens, and IMAX comprising $10 million (12%) of the film's total opening weekend.

The opening-weekend audience was 63% males and 83% people between 18 and 44 years old. In an opening-weekend poll conducted by Fandango, 71% of responders said that more superhero films should be rated R, while 86% were interested in seeing a more violent, adult X-Men film that weekend. Furthermore, 96% said they were excited to see Hugh Jackman, 94% were intrigued to see Patrick Stewart reprise his role as Professor X, and 76% were interested in watching newcomer Dafne Keen.

In its second weekend, the film dropped 56.9%, grossing $38.1 million and finishing second at the box office behind newcomer Kong: Skull Island ($61 million). In its third weekend, it made $17.8 million, finishing in third behind Beauty and the Beast ($174.8 million) and Kong: Skull Island ($27.8 million). In its fourth weekend, it made $10.1 million, dropping 43.1% from the previous week and finishing 5th at the box office.

==== Other countries ====
Logan was projected to open as high as $105 million. However, US forecasters believed that it could post an even higher opening if it were to overperform in major markets—most notably China. It opened day-and-date in almost every major market except Japan, where Doraemon the Movie 2017 was released. Fox ultimately decided to postpone the film's release there in order to avoid competition. Through Sunday, the film exceeded expectations and posted a five-day opening worth $159 million from 81 markets. This is Fox International's third-biggest launch of all time, behind X-Men: Days of Future Past ($172 million) and Avatar ($164 million). It debuted at No. 1 in 80 markets, surpassing Fifty Shades of Grey ($156 million) to have the highest international opening weekend for an R-rated film. It broke the record for the biggest R-rated IMAX release ever and the biggest 2D IMAX opening, with $10.6 million on 687 screens.

China is the movie's best-grossing market outside America, contributing $106 million in box office. The film was the first to feature an age-restriction warning in its marketing material, as required by a Film Promotion Law that took effect on March 1, 2017. Nevertheless, the film is still trimmed by 14 minutes, totaling 123 minutes. It is very likely that the move was due to usual censorship by the State Administration of Press, Publication, Radio, Film and Television, because of the violence depicted. Despite such restrictions, the film managed to debut with a better-than-expected $48.9 million, including previews, according to data from Ent Group (Fox reported $46.3 million). This marked the second-biggest X-Men opening in the country, trailing behind only Apocalypse. Tracking showed that the film opened with 85,000 screenings on Friday, which increased to about 95,000 on Saturday and Sunday, from a 9.98 million attendance. Included within that total was $4.4 million from 388 IMAX screens.

In Brazil, it recorded the biggest opening for Fox, and the seventh-biggest opening overall, with $8.2 million. The top openings were in China ($46.3 million), Korea ($8.2 million), and Russia ($7.1 million). In the UK, Logan made $11.4 million during its opening weekend, beating The Lego Batman Movie to reach the number one spot, while also achieving the second-highest opening weekend of the year, behind Sing. Meanwhile, in India, the film debuted with an estimated 17 crore ($2.5 million) net, equating to a gross of $3.4 million, on 1,400 screens. According to Fox, that was the highest debut for any X-Men title in the territory, marginally ahead of X-Men: Apocalypse. While the debut was not enough to break any significant records, it ranked as the second-biggest opening weekend for a Hollywood release in the January–March quarter, behind Batman v Superman: Dawn of Justice.

=== Critical response ===
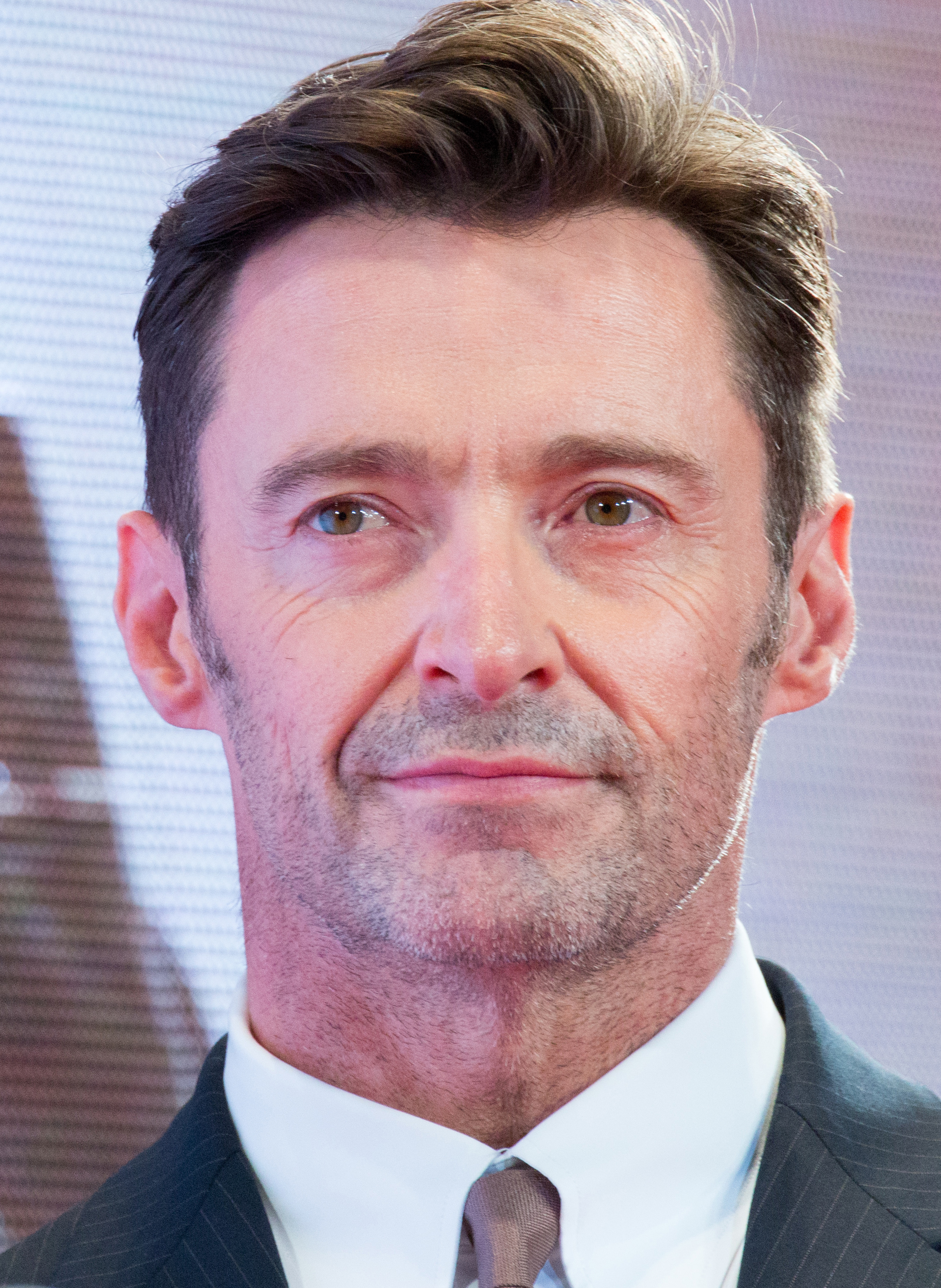
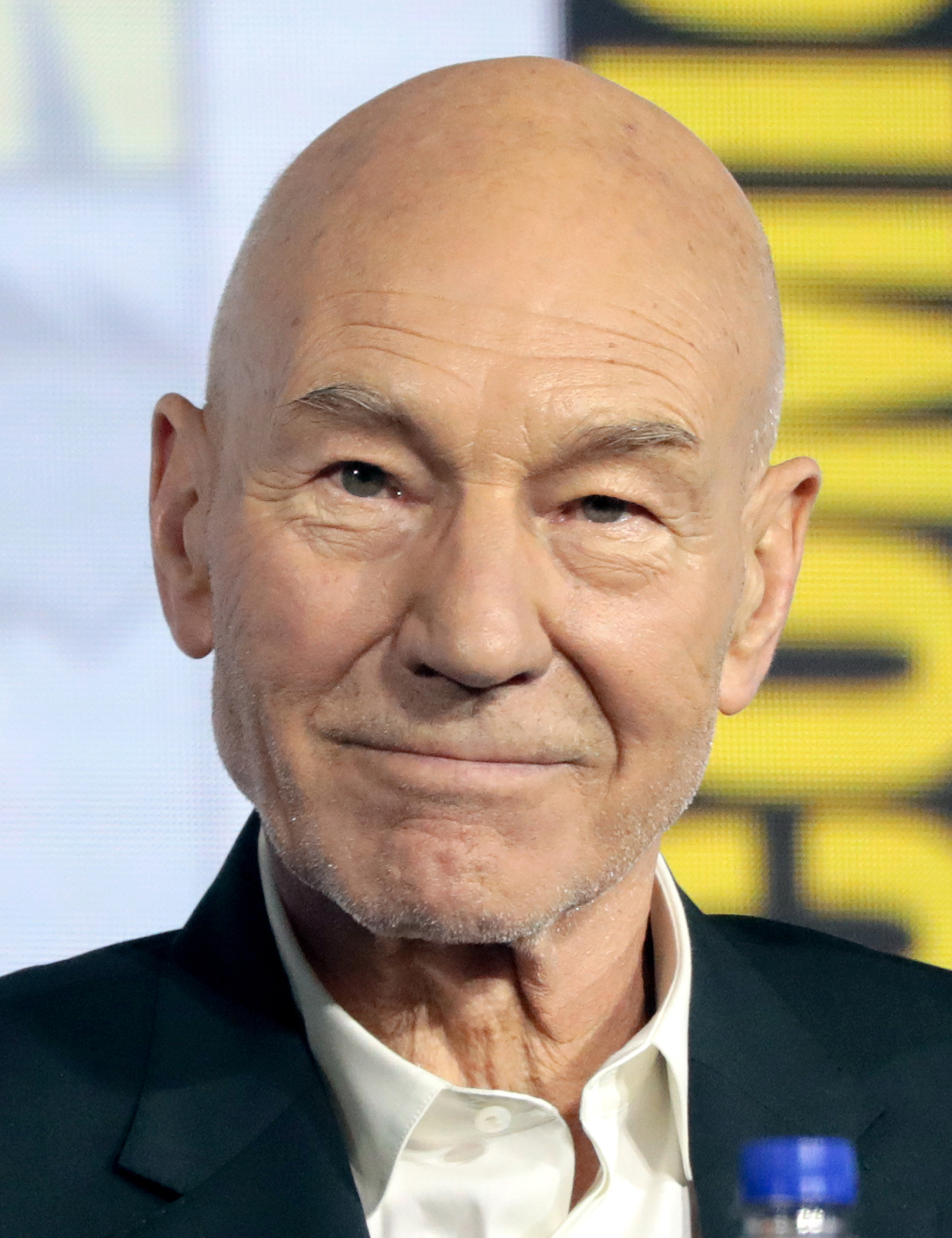
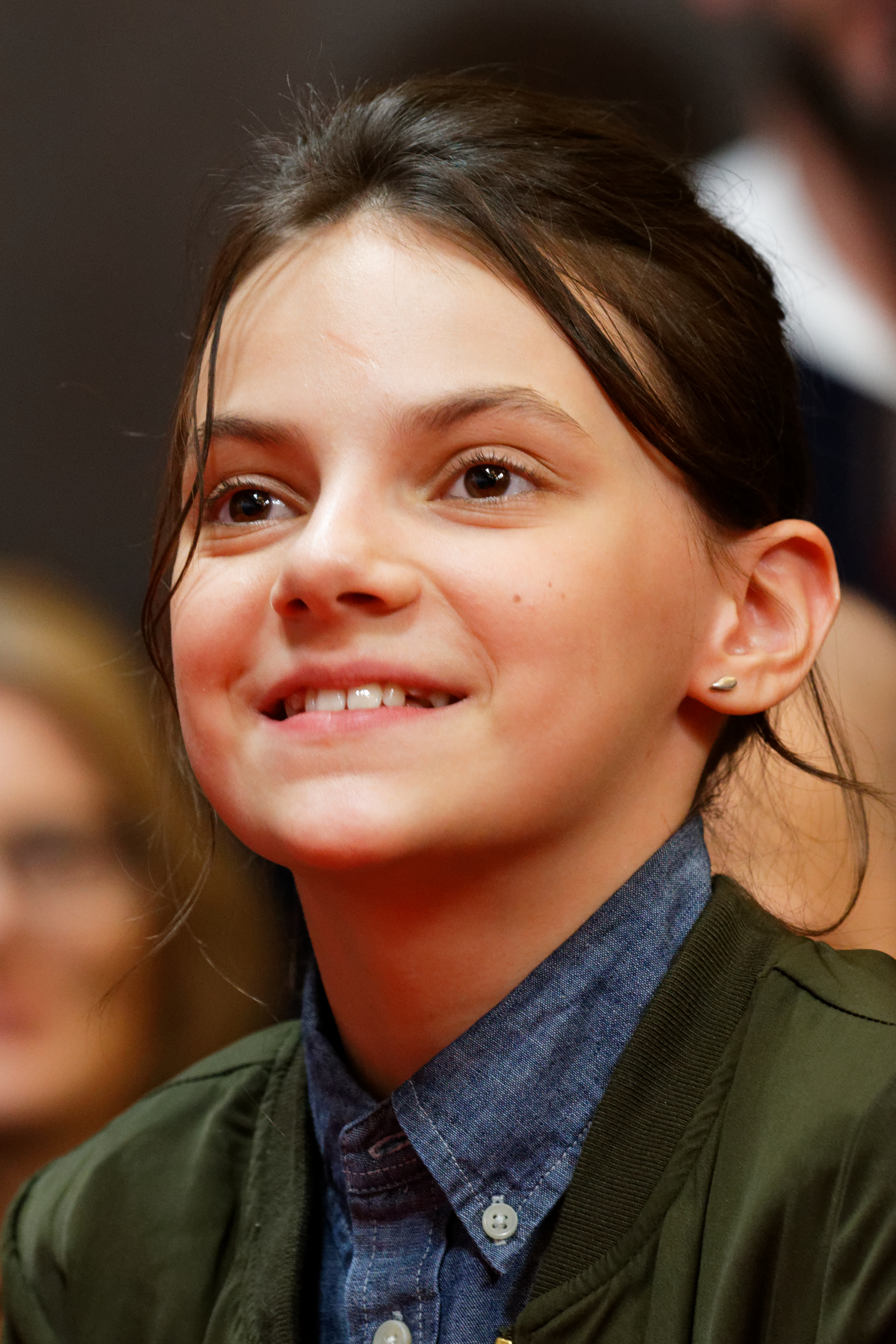
The performances of (left to right) Hugh Jackman, Patrick Stewart, and Dafne Keen received critical acclaim.

On the review aggregator website Rotten Tomatoes, 93% of 428 critics' reviews are positive, with an average rating of 8.0/10. The website's consensus reads: "Hugh Jackman makes the most of his final outing as Wolverine with a gritty, nuanced performance in a violent but surprisingly thoughtful superhero action film that defies genre conventions." Metacritic, which uses a weighted average, assigned the film a score of 77 out of 100, based on 51 critics, indicating "generally favorable" reviews. Audiences polled by CinemaScore gave an average grade of "A−" on an A+ to F scale, while PostTrak-surveyed audiences gave the film five out of five. Critics praised the film for its emotional depth, Mangold's direction, action sequences, screenplay, uncompromising tone, thematic profundity, and the performances of Jackman, Keen and Stewart.

Scott Collura of IGN gave Logan a score of 9.7/10, and called it, "an emotional, heavy picture, but it's also an uplifting one that reminds us that it's okay to fight for something more, something better", and "perhaps the best X-Men movie yet". A. A. Dowd of The A.V. Club gave an 'A−' and said that "[the film] manages to deliver the visceral goods, all the hardcore Wolverine action its fans could desire, while still functioning as a surprisingly thoughtful, even poignant drama—a terrific movie, no 'comic-book' qualifier required". Chris Nashawaty of Entertainment Weekly gave it a 'B−', and called it "both the most violent film in the series and the most sentimental one. When it's not showering you in blood, it's trying to make you spill tears." Sheri Linden of The Hollywood Reporter reacted positively, saying: "Seamlessly melding Marvel mythology with Western mythology, [director] James Mangold has crafted an affectingly stripped-down standalone feature, one that draws its strength from Hugh Jackman's nuanced turn as a reluctant, all but dissipated hero."

Peter Bradshaw of The Guardian gave it four out of five, stating "It is more like a survivalist thriller than a superhero film, and signals its wintry quality with the title itself" and compared Wolverine's hitting of his truck during the film to Basil Fawlty from Fawlty Towers. James Berardinelli of ReelViews gave it three and a half out of four, and said "In terms of tone and content, Logan is Deadpool's polar opposite but both productions refuse to play by traditional superhero movie rules ... With his glimpse into what superhero movies can be, James Mangold has given us something sadly lacking in recent genre entries: hope." Brian Tallerico of RogerEbert.com stated, "Logan has stakes that feel real, and fight choreography that's fluid and gorgeous instead of just computer-generated effects. Most importantly, Logan has characters with which you identify and about whom you care. It's not just 'great for a superhero movie', it's a great movie for any genre."

Brian Truitt of USA Today said, "Easily the best Wolverine outing, Logan is [the] Dark Knight of the mutant-filled X-franchise, a gripping film that transcends the comic-book genre by saying something important." Peter Travers of Rolling Stone gave three and a half out of four, and called it "a hard-ass, R-rated rager that explodes with action". Amy Nicholson of MTV called it "a phenomenal, throat-slashing, gut-stabbing superhero movie". Germain Lussier of io9 said, "Logan is beautiful, sophisticated, and still a kick-ass superhero film". Debbie Holloway of Crosswalk gave the film four out of five, praising how the "script also has several powerful themes, and is truly deft in its handling of them". Michael Roffman of Consequence of Sound called the film "A game-changing masterpiece". Matt Donato of We Got This Covered said, "It's not just one of the best superhero movies ever, it's a damn-fine cinematic representation of the human condition in all its agonizing forms." Joe Morgenstern of The Wall Street Journal said, "It's the best superhero film to come out of the comic-book world, and I'm not forgetting Christopher Nolan's 'The Dark Knight'." Jackman's acting as Wolverine has been praised, and his performance topped The Hollywood Reporter's Greatest Superhero Movie Performances of All Time list.

Anthony Lane of The New Yorker was underwhelmed, commenting on the film's parallel with Shane, "These quiet images (from Shane) brand themselves on the mind, and the gunshots come as an overwhelming release, whereas when Logan and Laura unleash their furious scythes nothing feels settled or satisfied." Mara Reinstein of Us Weekly gave the movie two and a half out of four, in a lukewarm review, said that "[t]he film loses its way during the 20-minutes-too-long journey. For all the breathless talk about how Logan transcends the superhero genre, there's nothing groundbreaking about a road trip movie in which adults try to elude the bad guys to protect a super-special child." Michael Phillips of the Chicago Tribune gave it two out of four and said, "Logan is deadly serious, and while its gamer-style killing sprees are meant to be excitingly brutal, I found them numbing and, in the climax, borderline offensive." Stephanie Zacharek of Time magazine said, "The grim side of human nature is all over James Mangold's Logan. But that doesn't necessarily make it a good movie."

=== Accolades ===
Award	Date of ceremony	Category	Recipient(s)	Result	Ref.
AACTA International Awards	January 6, 2018	Best Actor	Hugh Jackman	Nominated	
Academy Awards	March 4, 2018	Best Adapted Screenplay	Scott Frank, James Mangold and Michael Green	Nominated	
Art Directors Guild Awards	January 27, 2018	Excellence in Production Design for a Contemporary Film	François Audouy	Won	
Chicago Film Critics Association	December 12, 2017	Best Adapted Screenplay	Scott Frank, James Mangold and Michael Green	Nominated	
Chicago Film Critics Association	December 12, 2017	Most Promising Performer	Dafne Keen	Nominated	
Critics' Choice Movie Awards	January 11, 2018	Best Action Movie	Logan	Nominated	
Critics' Choice Movie Awards	January 11, 2018	Best Supporting Actor	Patrick Stewart	Nominated	
Critics' Choice Movie Awards	January 11, 2018	Best Young Performer	Dafne Keen	Nominated	
Detroit Film Critics Society	December 7, 2017	Best Supporting Actor	Patrick Stewart	Nominated	
Dragon Awards	September 3, 2017	Best Science Fiction or Fantasy Movie	Logan	Nominated	
Dublin Film Critics' Circle	December 14, 2017	Best Film	Logan (with God's Own Country)	9th place	
Dublin Film Critics' Circle	December 14, 2017	Best Director	James Mangold	10th place	
Dublin Film Critics' Circle	December 14, 2017	Best Actor	Hugh Jackman	9th place	
Dublin Film Critics' Circle	December 14, 2017	Breakthrough Artist of the Year	Dafne Keen	Nominated	
Empire Awards	March 23, 2018	Best Actor	Hugh Jackman	Won	
Empire Awards	March 23, 2018	Best Female Newcomer	Dafne Keen	Won	
Empire Awards	March 23, 2018	Best Sci-Fi/Fantasy	Logan	Nominated	
Golden Tomato Awards	January 3, 2018	Best Wide Release 2017	Logan	6th place	
Golden Tomato Awards	January 3, 2018	Best Comic Book/Graphic Novel Movie 2017	Logan	2nd place	
Golden Trailer Awards	June 6, 2017	Best Music	20th Century Fox, Rogue Planet	Won	
Golden Trailer Awards	June 6, 2017	Best Radio/Audio Spot	20th Century Fox, Picture Production Company	Nominated	
Hollywood Music in Media Awards	November 16, 2017	Best Original Score – Sci-Fi/Fantasy/Horror Film	Marco Beltrami	Nominated	
Houston Film Critics Society	January 6, 2018	Best Picture	Logan	Nominated	
Houston Film Critics Society	January 6, 2018	Best Supporting Actor	Patrick Stewart	Nominated	
Houston Film Critics Society	January 6, 2018	Best Supporting Actress	Dafne Keen	Nominated	
IGN Awards	December 19, 2017	Movie of the Year	Logan	Nominated	
IGN Awards	December 19, 2017	Best Action Movie	Logan	Won	
IGN Awards	December 19, 2017	Best Lead Performer in a Movie	Hugh Jackman	Nominated	
IGN Awards	December 19, 2017	Best Supporting Performer in a Movie	Dafne Keen	Nominated	
IGN Awards	December 19, 2017	Best Supporting Performer in a Movie	Patrick Stewart	Won	
Location Managers Guild Awards	April 7, 2018	Outstanding Locations in Contemporary Film	Maria Bierniak	Nominated	
London Film Critics' Circle	January 28, 2018	Young British / Irish Performer of the Year	Dafne Keen	Nominated	
MTV Movie & TV Awards	May 7, 2017	Movie of the Year	Logan	Nominated	
MTV Movie & TV Awards	May 7, 2017	Best Actor in a Movie	Hugh Jackman	Nominated	
MTV Movie & TV Awards	May 7, 2017	Best Duo	Hugh Jackman and Dafne Keen	Won	
National Board of Review	January 9, 2018	Top 10 Films	Logan	Won	
Online Film Critics Society Awards	December 28, 2017	Best Supporting Actor	Patrick Stewart	Nominated	
Ray Bradbury Nebula Award	May 19, 2018	Outstanding Dramatic Presentation	James Mangold, Scott Frank, Michael Green	Nominated	
Satellite Awards	February 10, 2018	Best Sound	Logan	Nominated	
Saturn Awards	June 27, 2018	Best Comic-to-Motion Picture Release	Logan	Nominated	
Saturn Awards	June 27, 2018	Best Actor	Hugh Jackman	Nominated	
Saturn Awards	June 27, 2018	Best Supporting Actor	Patrick Stewart	Won	
Saturn Awards	June 27, 2018	Best Performance by a Younger Actor	Dafne Keen	Nominated	
Saturn Awards	June 27, 2018	Best Writing	Scott Frank, Michael Green and James Mangold	Nominated	
Saturn Awards	June 27, 2018	Best Editing	Michael McCusker and Dirk Westervelt	Nominated	
Screen Actors Guild Awards	January 21, 2018	Outstanding Performance by a Stunt Ensemble in a Motion Picture	Logan	Nominated	
Seattle Film Critics Society	December 18, 2017	Best Picture of the Year	Logan	Nominated	
Seattle Film Critics Society	December 18, 2017	Best Actor in a Supporting Role	Patrick Stewart	Nominated	
Seattle Film Critics Society	December 18, 2017	Best Youth Performance	Dafne Keen	Nominated	
Teen Choice Awards	August 13, 2017	Choice Action Movie	Logan	Nominated	
Teen Choice Awards	August 13, 2017	Choice Action Movie Actor	Hugh Jackman	Nominated	
USC Scripter Awards	February 10, 2018	Best Adapted Screenplay	Scott Frank, James Mangold, Michael Green, Roy Thomas, Len Wein and John Romita Sr.	Nominated	
Washington D.C. Area Film Critics Association	December 8, 2017	Best Youth Performance	Dafne Keen	Nominated	
Writers Guild of America Awards	February 11, 2018	Best Adapted Screenplay	Scott Frank, James Mangold and Michael Green	Nominated	

== Franchise ==
=== Cancelled spin-off ===
In October 2017, it was reported that director James Mangold had begun writing a sequel to Logan, tentatively titled Laura, focusing on Laura and the continuation of her story, with Logan being represented with archive footage of Jackman. After Disney's acquisition of Fox was finalized in 2019, all X-Men films in development were stalled, leaving the future of Laura uncertain. In November 2019, Mangold said he did not think the project would be happening, and that he believed the studio would be trying to figure out where to go in the future with the characters, particularly with Wolverine.

=== Marvel Cinematic Universe ===
Jackman and Keen reprised their roles in the Marvel Studios film Deadpool & Wolverine (2024), which continues some storylines from Logan. In the film, Wade Wilson visits Logan's grave in North Dakota before using his adamantium skeleton to fight off a team of agents from the Time Variance Authority. Later, an older and more mature Laura motivates an alternate version of Logan by referencing her experiences with her father.
