= List of highest-grossing R-rated films =

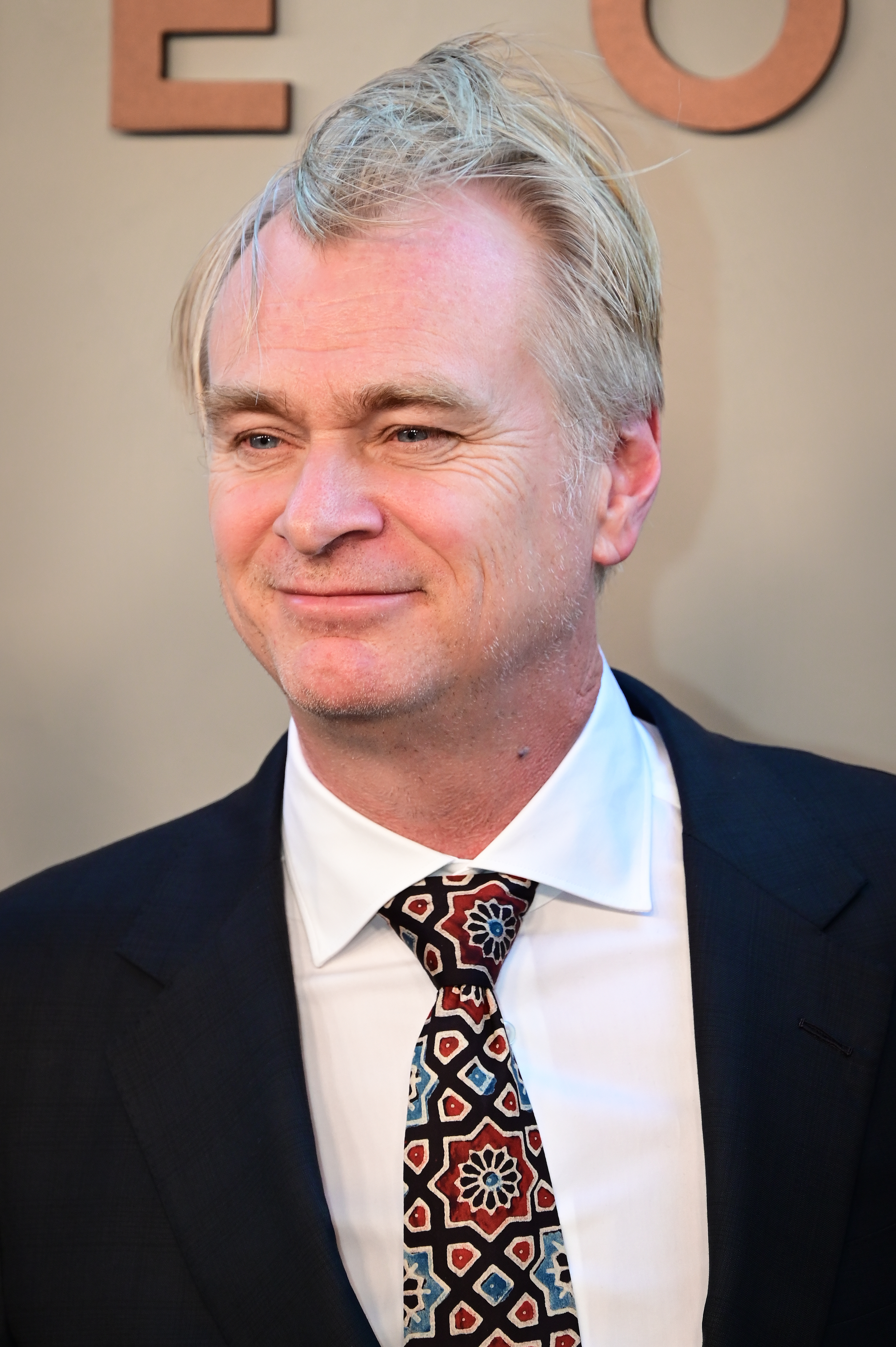
Two of the highest-grossing R-rated films, The Odyssey and Oppenheimer, were written and directed by Christopher Nolan.

This is a list of the highest-grossing R-rated films. An R-rated film is a film that has been assessed as having material which may be unsuitable for children under the age of 17 by the Motion Picture Association; the MPA writes "Under 17 requires accompanying parent or adult guardian". The R-rating applies to the United States, with similar ratings given in TV-MA for television and home video releases, as well as other countries such as 14A and 18A in Canada, 15 or 18 in the United Kingdom, and MA 15+ and R 18+ in Australia. All lists in this article are unadjusted for inflation except where specifically noted.

The Odyssey is the highest-grossing R-rated film of all time. Demon Slayer: Kimetsu no Yaiba anime film series is the highest-grossing R-rated animated and non-English-language film franchise, with Infinity Castle as the highest-grossing R-rated animated and non-English-language film of all time.

== Highest-grossing R-rated films ==
The following are the top 50 highest grossing R-rated films of all time. As the only three R-rated films to gross $1 billion worldwide, The Odyssey, Deadpool & Wolverine and Joker sit among the 50 highest-grossing films of all time.

† Background shading indicates films playing in the week commencing 6 November 2026 in theaters around the world.

Rank	Peak	Film	Year	Worldwide gross	Ref.
1	1	The Odyssey †	2026	$1,815,826,402	
2	1	Deadpool & Wolverine	2024	$1,338,073,645	
3	1	Joker	2019	$1,078,751,311	
4	2	Oppenheimer	2023	$983,148,052	
5	4	Demon Slayer The Movie: Infinity Castle	2025	$793,594,078	
6	1	Deadpool 2	2018	$785,896,632	
7	1	Deadpool	2016	$782,612,155	
8	1	The Matrix Reloaded	2003	$741,847,937	
9	3	It	2017	$704,242,888	
10	6	Detective Chinatown 3^{NA}	2021	$686,257,563	
11	2	The Passion of the Christ	2004	$623,395,363	
12	3	Logan	2017	$619,021,436	
13	3	The Hangover Part II	2011	$586,764,305	
14	4	Fifty Shades of Grey	2015	$569,651,467	
15	6	The Mermaid^{NA}	2016	$553,810,228	
16	4	Ted	2012	$549,368,315	
17	5	American Sniper	2014	$547,326,372	
18	11	Detective Chinatown 2^{NA}	2018	$544,068,574	
19	7	The Revenant	2015	$532,938,302	
20	20	Obsession †	2026	$525,089,752	
21	1	Terminator 2: Judgment Day	1991	$518,867,637	
22	16	Demon Slayer The Movie: Mugen Train	2020	$512,704,063	
23	21	The Conjuring: Last Rites	2025	$499,156,445	
24	3	Troy	2004	$497,409,852	
25	2	Saving Private Ryan	1998	$485,035,085	
26	18	It Chapter Two	2019	$473,123,154	
27	12	Lucy	2014	$469,058,574	
28	5	Gladiator	2000	$465,516,248	
29	6	The Hangover	2009	$465,487,583	
30	3	The Matrix	1999	$465,377,200	
31	1	Pretty Woman	1990	$463,406,268	
32	28	Gladiator II	2024	$462,180,717	
33	9	300	2007	$456,068,181	
34	7	The Last Samurai	2003	$454,627,263	
35	25	1917	2019	$446,064,352	
36	28	John Wick: Chapter 4	2023	$440,157,245	
37	24	A Star Is Born	2018	$434,888,866	
38	7	Terminator 3: Rise of the Machines	2003	$433,371,112	
39	1	The Exorcist	1973	$430,872,776	
40	8	The Matrix Revolutions	2003	$427,344,031	
41	16	The Intouchables^{NA}	2011	$426,590,315	
42	31	Bad Boys for Life	2020	$426,505,244	
43	18	Django Unchained	2012	$425,368,238	
44	22	Mad Max: Fury Road	2015	$415,261,382	
45	14	Sex and the City	2008	$415,253,641	
46	19	Kingsman: The Secret Service	2015	$414,351,546	
47	16	The King's Speech	2010	$414,242,458	
48	3	The Bodyguard	1992	$411,006,740	
49	31	Kingsman: The Golden Circle	2017	$410,902,662	
50	23	The Wolf of Wall Street	2013	$407,039,432	

== R-rated animated films ==
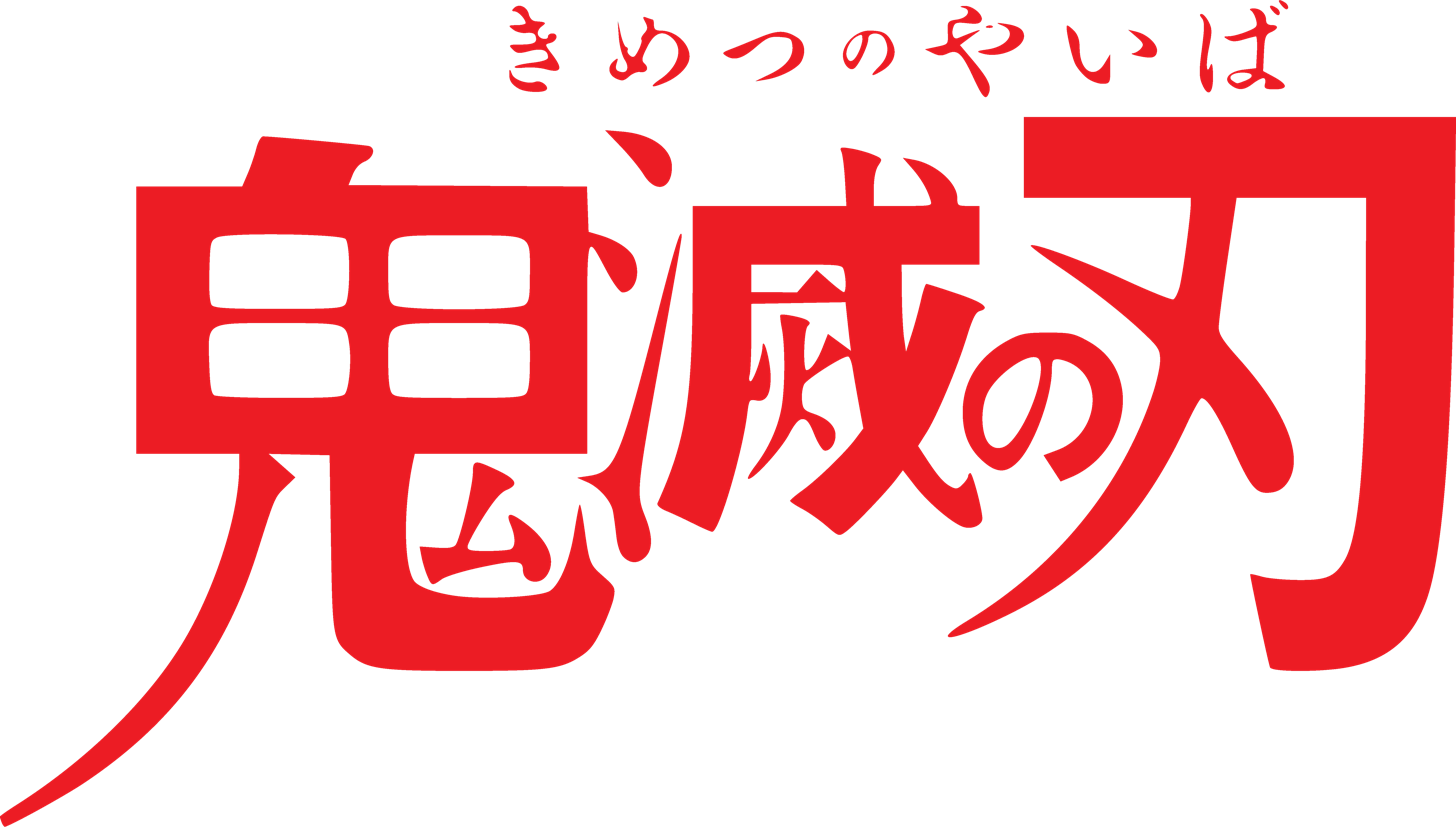
Demon Slayer: Kimetsu no Yaiba anime film series earned more than $1 billion of box-office gross internationally, the first R-rated animated film series to do so, with Infinity Castle being the highest-grossing R-rated animated film of all time.

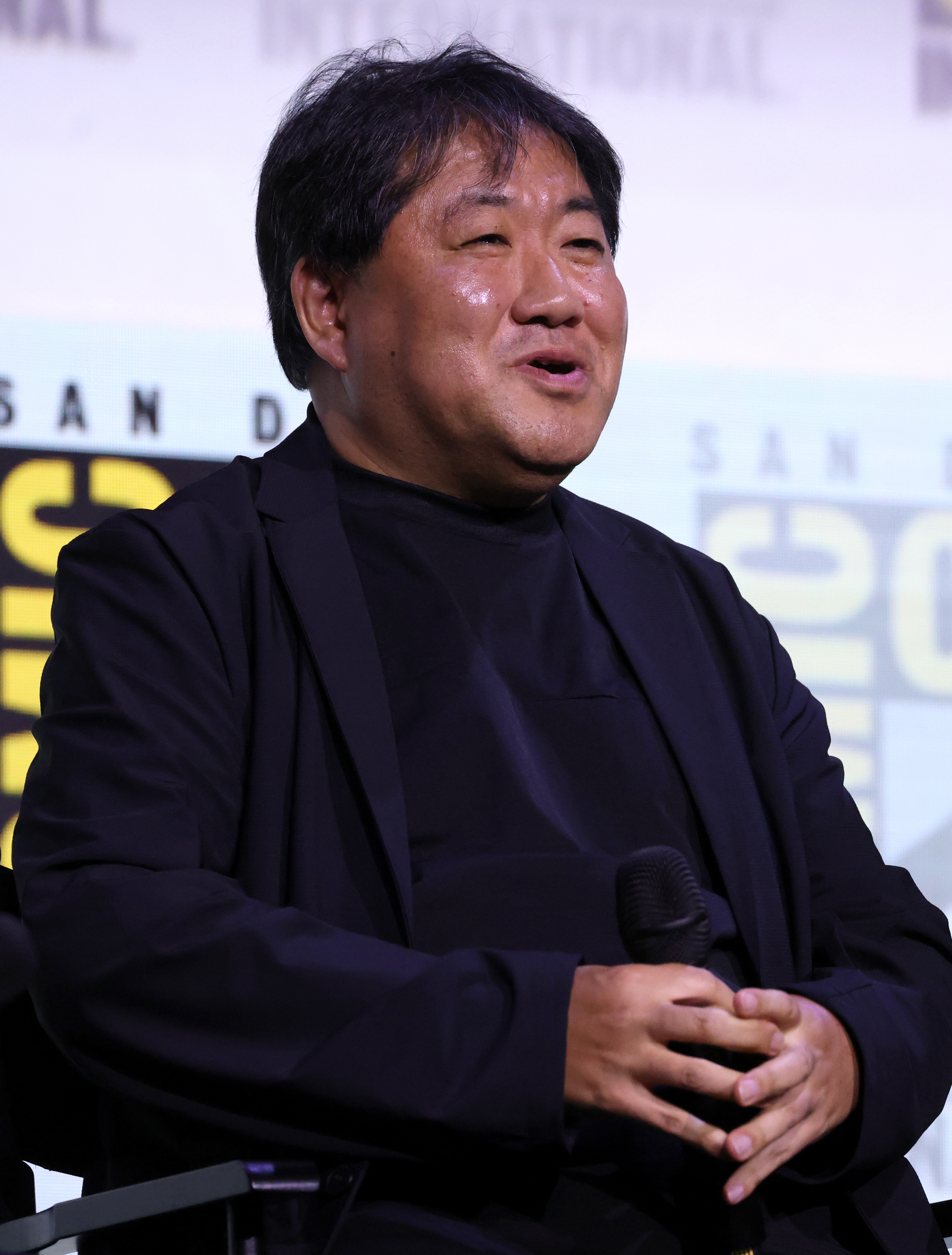
Haruo Sotozaki (pictured in 2025) directed the most R-rated animated films on the list with four entires, mostly Demon Slayer: Kimetsu no Yaiba anime films.

The following is a list of R-rated animated films that have surpassed $1 million at the box office; TV-MA-rated, the television equivalent of the Motion Picture Association R-rating, is also included but must be applied on the list. 2016, 2024 and 2025 are the most frequent year with two films, and over two-thirds were released after the year 2000.

Rank	Film	Year	Worldwide gross	Domestic gross	Ref.
1	Demon Slayer The Movie: Infinity Castle	2025	$793,594,078	$136,950,340	
2	Demon Slayer The Movie: Mugen Train	2020	$512,704,063	$50,272,044	
3	Chainsaw Man – The Movie: Reze Arc	2025	$181,115,803	$43,438,461	
4	Sausage Party	2016	$140,705,322	$97,685,686	
5	Evangelion: 3.0+1.0 Thrice Upon a Time^{NA}	2021	$93,763,012	$810,744	
6	Fritz the Cat	1972	$90,000,000	$25,000,000	
7	South Park: Bigger, Longer & Uncut	1999	$83,137,603	$52,037,603	
8	Demon Slayer: To the Swordsmith Village	2023	$59,554,259	$16,945,424	
9	Demon Slayer: To the Hashira Training	2024	$50,439,672	$17,657,658	
10	Akira^{NA}	1988	$49,000,000	$553,171	
11	The End of Evangelion^{NA}	1997	$22,537,729	$1,302,300	
12	Pink Floyd – The Wall^{NA}	1982	$22,265,763	$22,244,207	
13	Fate/Stay Night: Heaven's Feel - III. Spring Song^{NA}	2020	$20,150,000	$200,000	
14	Heavy Metal	1981	$20,063,636	$546,545	
15	Fate/Stay Night: Heaven's Feel - II. Lost Butterfly^{NA}	2019	$19,790,000	$420,595	
16	Fate/Stay Night: Heaven's Feel - I. Presage Flower^{NA}	2017	$17,422,935	$193,833	
17	Neon Genesis Evangelion: Death & Rebirth^{NA}	1997	$15,455,713		
18	Waltz with Bashir^{NA}	2008	$13,912,289	$2,283,849	
19	The Peasants^{NA}	2023	$10,064,347	$155,188	
20	A Scanner Darkly	2006	$7,659,918	$5,501,616	
21	Memoir of a Snail^{NA}	2024	$7,634,622	$669,798	
22	Fullmetal Alchemist: The Sacred Star of Milos^{NA}	2011	$7,579,282	$177,802	
23	American Pop	1981	$6,000,000		
24	Anomalisa	2015	$5,706,168	$3,759,286	
25	Aqua Teen Hunger Force Colon Movie Film for Theaters	2007	$5,520,368	$5,520,368	
26	Made in Abyss: Dawn of the Deep Soul	2020	$4,971,635		
27	Batman: The Killing Joke	2016	$4,462,034	$3,775,000	
28	Waking Life	2001	$3,176,880		
29	Spriggan^{NA}	2017	$3,149,387		
30	Cowboy Bebop: The Movie^{NA}	2001	$3,007,903	$1,000,000	
31	Renaissance^{NA}	2006	$2,401,413		
32	Resident Evil: Damnation^{NA}	2012	$2,325,035		
33	Ghost in the Shell^{NA} (Note: Ghost in the Shell (1995) was originally rated R by the MPAA when it was first released in the United States. Despite this in later decades, it was re-rated to TV-MA for home video releases, and was Not Rated for theatrical releases. Which many critics and audiences still consider it an R-rating.)	1995	$2,287,714	$889,074	
34	Appleseed^{NA}	2004	$1,650,432	$129,135	
35	Resident Evil: Vendetta^{NA}	2017	$1,596,320		
36	Heavy Traffic	1974	$1,500,000		
37	Berserk: The Golden Age Arc I - The Egg of the King	2012	$1,348,352		
38	I Lost My Body^{NA}	2019	$1,136,431		

^{NA}Not American films, achieving less than 3% of their total gross in the United States and Canada.

== Highest-grossing films by year ==
† indicates films playing in theaters around the world in the week commencing 6 November 2026.

Year	Title	Worldwide gross	Budget	Ref.
1969	Easy Rider	$60,000,000	$360,000	
1970	M*A*S*H	$81,600,193	$3,025,000	
1971	The French Connection	$187,500,000	$1,800,000	
1972	The Godfather	$291,000,000	$6,000,000	
1973	The Exorcist	$441,306,145	$12,000,000	
1974	Blazing Saddles	$119,880,357	$2,600,000	
1975	One Flew Over the Cuckoo's Nest	$163,250,000	$3,000,000	
1976	A Star Is Born	$80,000,115	$6,000,000	
1977	Saturday Night Fever	$237,113,184	$3,500,000	
1978	National Lampoon's Animal House	$141,607,219	$3,000,000	
1979	Alien	$203,628,947	$11,000,000	
1980	The Blues Brothers	$115,229,890	$30,000,000	
1981	Stripes	$85,297,000	$10,000,000	
1982	An Officer and a Gentleman	$129,795,554	$6,000,000	
1983	Flashdance	$201,463,574	$7,000,000	
1984	Beverly Hills Cop	$316,360,478	$15,000,000	
1985	Rambo: First Blood Part II	$300,400,432	$25,500,000	
1986	Platoon	$138,545,632	$6,000,000	
1987	Fatal Attraction	$320,145,693	$14,000,000	
1988	Rain Man	$354,825,435	$25,000,000	
1989	Lethal Weapon 2	$227,853,986	$30,000,000	
1990	Pretty Woman	$463,406,268	$14,000,000	
1991	Terminator 2: Judgment Day	$520,884,847	$102,000,000	
1992	The Bodyguard	$411,006,740	$25,000,000	
1993	Schindler's List	$322,243,445	$22,000,000	
1994	True Lies	$378,882,411	$115,000,000	
1995	Die Hard with a Vengeance	$366,236,538	$90,000,000	
1996	The Rock	$335,062,621	$75,000,000	
1997	Air Force One	$315,156,409	$85,000,000	
1998	Saving Private Ryan	$482,349,603	$70,000,000	
1999	The Matrix	$465,343,787	$63,000,000	
2000	Gladiator	$460,583,960	$103,000,000	
2001	Hannibal	$351,692,268	$87,000,000	
2002	8 Mile	$242,875,078	$41,000,000	
2003	The Matrix Reloaded	$741,847,937	$150,000,000	
2004	The Passion of the Christ	$611,899,420	$30,000,000	
2005	Wedding Crashers	$288,467,645	$40,000,000	
2006	The Departed	$291,465,034	$90,000,000	
2007	300	$456,068,181	$65,000,000	
2008	Sex and the City	$418,765,321	$65,000,000	
2009	The Hangover	$465,764,086	$35,000,000	
2010	The King's Speech	$410,867,243	$15,000,000	
2011	The Hangover Part II	$586,764,305	$80,000,000	
2012	Ted	$549,368,315	$50,000,000	
2013	The Wolf of Wall Street	$392,000,694	$100,000,000	
2014	American Sniper	$547,426,372	$59,000,000	
2015	Fifty Shades of Grey	$569,651,467	$40,000,000	
2016	Deadpool	$782,612,155	$58,000,000	
2017	It	$704,242,888	$35,000,000	
2018	Deadpool 2	$785,896,609	$110,000,000	
2019	Joker	$1,074,251,311	$55,000,000	
2020	Demon Slayer The Movie: Mugen Train	$512,704,063	$15,765,750	
2021	Detective Chinatown 3^{NA}	$686,257,563	$116,630,000	
2022	Bullet Train	$239,141,352	$90,000,000	
2023	Oppenheimer	$976,120,348	$100,000,000	
2024	Deadpool & Wolverine	$1,338,073,645	$429,000,000	
2025	Demon Slayer The Movie: Infinity Castle	$793,594,078	$20,000,000	
2026	The Odyssey †	$1,796,085,794	$250,000,000	

== Timeline of highest-grossing films ==
Since 1953, eleven films have held the record of highest-grossing R-rated film.

Title	Released	Record established	Record-setting gross	Ref.
Mom and Dad	1945	1956*	$80,000,000	
Mom and Dad	1945	1969*	$100,000,000	
The Godfather	1972	1972	$243,862,778	
The Exorcist	1973	1979**	$329,017,945	
Rain Man	1988	1988	$354,825,435	
Pretty Woman	1990	1990	$463,406,268	
Terminator 2: Judgment Day	1991	1991	$516,950,043	
The Matrix Reloaded	2003	2003	$741,847,937	
Deadpool	2016	2016	$782,612,155	
Deadpool 2	2018	2018	$785,896,609	
Joker	2019	2019	$1,074,251,311	
Deadpool & Wolverine	2024	2024	$1,338,073,645	
The Odyssey	2026	2026	$1,796,085,794	

^{*}Mom and Dad was released in 1945, but reached $80M in 1955. Some estimates put its total gross by the end of the 1960s to be $100 million.

^{**}The Godfather was overtaken by Jaws (rated PG) as the highest-grossing film of all-time in 1976. The Exorcist only overtook The Godfather on one of its many re-releases, beginning in 1976. It is not known on exactly which re-release The Exorcist surpassed The Godfather in worldwide gross, but in the United States and Canada it happened in 1979.

== Highest-grossing film franchises ==
Some of the listed franchises have also released films with other ratings. Only R-rated films are included here. Only franchises with at least two R-rated films are listed.

X-Men is the highest grossing r rated series of all time grossing $3.5B and has the best average with $881.5 million pre film.

Highest-grossing R-rated film series and franchises(The films in each franchise can be viewed by selecting "show")

Rank	Series	Total worldwide box office	No. of films	Average of films	Highest-grossing film

1
X-Men
$3,525,828,218
4
$881,457,055
Deadpool & Wolverine ($1,338,073,382)

	Deadpool series	$2,906,806,782	3	$968,935,594	Deadpool & Wolverine ($1,338,073,382)
1	Deadpool & Wolverine (2024)	$1,338,073,382			
2	Deadpool 2 (2018)	$785,896,609			
3	Deadpool (2016)	$782,836,791			

Logan (2017)	$619,021,436

2	The Conjuring Universe	$2,903,037,098	11	$263,912,463	Last Rites ($499,156,445)
/ The Conjuring series / $1,348,814,363 / 4 / $337,203,591 / Last Rites ($499,156,445); 1 / Last Rites (2025) / $499,156,445; 2 / The Conjuring 2 (2016) / $322,811,702; 3 / The Conjuring (2013) / $320,415,166; 4 / The Devil Made Me Do It (2021) / $206,431,050
/ Annabelle series / $795,434,744 / 3 / $265,144,915 / Creation ($306,592,201); 1 / Creation (2017) / $306,592,201; 2 / Annabelle (2014) / $257,589,952; 3 / Comes Home (2019) / $231,252,591
/ The Nun series / $635,549,870 / 2 / $317,774,935 / The Nun ($366,082,797); 1 / The Nun (2018) / $366,082,797; 2 / The Nun II (2023) / $269,467,073
The Curse of La Llorona (2019) / $123,233,739
Wolves at the Door (2016) / $4,382

3
Alien
$1,995,371,782
9
$221,707,976
Prometheus ($403,354,469)

	Main series	$1,687,653,807	7	$241,093,401	Prometheus ($403,354,469)
1	Prometheus (2012)	$403,354,469			
2	Romulus (2024)	$350,865,342			
3	Covenant (2017)	$240,892,187			
4	Alien (1979)	$188,034,787			
5	Aliens (1986)	$183,316,455			
6	Resurrection (1997)	$161,376,069			
7	Alien 3 (1992)	$159,814,498			

	Alien vs. Predator	$307,717,975	2	$153,858,988	Alien vs. Predator ($177,427,090)
1	Alien vs. Predator (2004)	$177,427,090			
2	Requiem (2007)	$130,290,885			

4	The Matrix	$1,789,251,650	4	$447,312,913	The Matrix Reloaded ($741,847,937)
1	Reloaded (2003)	$741,847,937			
2	The Matrix (1999)	$463,517,383			
3	Revolutions (2003)	$427,343,298			
4	Resurrections (2021)	$156,543,032			

5	Resident Evil †	$1,668,618,279	12	$139,051,523	Resident Evil (2026) ($384,195,017)
/ Original series / $1,237,978,176 / 6 / $206,329,696 / The Final Chapter ($314,101,190); 1 / The Final Chapter (2017) / $314,101,190; 2 / Afterlife (2010) / $300,228,084; 3 / Retribution (2012) / $240,647,629; 4 / Extinction (2007) / $149,871,103; 5 / Apocalypse (2004) / $129,342,769; 6 / Resident Evil (2002) / $103,787,401
Resident Evil (2026) † / $384,195,017
Welcome to Raccoon City (2021) / $41,914,915
/ Animated series / $4,110,900 / 4 / $1,027,725 / Damnation ($2,325,035); 1 / Damnation (2012) / $2,325,035; 2 / Vendetta (2017) / $1,203,792; 3 / Degeneration (2008) / $538,912; 4 / Death Island (2023) / $43,161

6	The Hangover	$1,416,248,289	3	$472,082,763	The Hangover Part II ($586,764,305)
1	The Hangover Part II (2011)	$586,764,305			
2	The Hangover (2009)	$467,483,912			
3	The Hangover Part III (2013)	$362,000,072			

7	Demon Slayer: Kimetsu no Yaiba	$1,416,292,072	4	$354,073,018	Infinity Castle ($793,594,078)
1	Infinity Castle (2025)	$793,594,078			
2	Mugen Train (2020)	$512,704,063			
3	To the Swordsmith Village (2023)	$59,554,259			
4	To the Hashira Training (2024)	$50,439,672			

8	Batman †	$1,373,546,240	5	$274,709,248	Joker ($1,074,458,282)
/ Joker series / $1,281,958,569 / 2 / $640,979,285 / Joker ($1,074,458,282); 1 / Joker (2019) / $1,074,458,282; 2 / Folie à Deux (2024) / $207,500,287
Clayface (2026) † / $87,086,546
/ DC Universe Animated Original Movies / $4,501,125 / 2 / $2,250,563 / The Killing Joke ($4,462,034); 1 / The Killing Joke (2016) / $4,462,034; 2 / Batman and Harley Quinn (2017) / $39,091

9	Detective Chinatown	$1,356,285,654	3	$452,095,218	Detective Chinatown 3 ($686,257,563)
1	Detective Chinatown 3 (2021)	$686,257,563			
2	Detective Chinatown 2 (2018)	$544,185,156			
3	Detective Chinatown (2016)	$125,842,935			

10	Fifty Shades	$1,322,263,368	3	$440,754,456	Grey ($568,810,483)
1	Grey (2015)	$568,810,483			
2	Darker (2017)	$381,543,436			
3	Freed (2018)	$371,909,449			

11	Terminator	$1,292,704,949	4	$323,176,237	Judgment Day ($519,843,345)
1	Judgment Day (1991)	$519,843,345			
2	Rise of the Machines (2003)	$433,371,112			
3	Dark Fate (2019)	$261,119,292			
4	The Terminator (1984)	$78,371,200			

12	Bad Boys	$1,243,628,584	4	$310,907,146	For Life ($425,514,702)
1	For Life (2020)	$425,514,702			
2	Ride or Die (2024)	$403,367,302			
3	Bad Boys II (2003)	$273,339,556			
4	Bad Boys (1995)	$141,407,024			

13	It	$1,177,366,042	2	$588,683,021	It ($704,242,888)
1	It (2017)	$704,242,888			
2	It Chapter Two (2019)	$473,123,154			

14
John Wick
$1,166,143,148
5
$233,228,630
John Wick: Chapter 4 ($440,146,694)

	Main Series	$1,028,926,563	4	$257,231,641	John Wick: Chapter 4 ($440,146,694)
1	Chapter 4 (2023)	$440,146,694			
2	Chapter 3 – Parabellum (2019)	$328,349,387			
3	Chapter 2 (2017)	$174,348,632			
4	John Wick (2014)	$86,081,850			

Ballerina (2025)	$137,216,585

15	Saw	$1,128,720,386	10	$112,872,039	Saw III ($164,874,275)
1	Saw III (2006)	$164,874,275			
2	Saw II (2005)	$147,748,505			
3	Saw IV (2007)	$139,352,633			
4	Saw 3D (2010)	$136,150,434			
5	Saw V (2008)	$113,864,059			
6	Saw X (2023)	$111,828,698			
7	Saw (2004)	$103,096,345			
8	Jigsaw (2017)	$102,952,888			
9	Saw VI (2009)	$68,233,629			
10	Spiral (2021)	$40,618,920			

16	Scream	$1,126,254,066	7	$160,893,438	Scream 7 ($213,835,967)
1	Scream 7 (2026) †	$213,835,967			
2	Scream (1996)	$173,046,663			
3	Scream 2 (1997)	$172,363,301			
4	Scream VI (2023)	$169,063,850			
5	Scream 3 (2000)	$161,838,076			
6	Scream (2022)	$138,874,789			
7	Scream 4 (2011)	$97,231,420			

17	Die Hard	$1,052,554,898	4	$263,138,725	Die Hard with a Vengeance ($366,101,666)
1	Die Hard with a Vengeance (1995)	$366,101,666			
2	A Good Day to Die Hard (2013)	$304,654,182			
3	Die Hard 2 (1990)	$241,031,094			
4	Die Hard (1988)	$140,767,956			

18	American Pie	$989,475,386	4	$247,368,847	American Pie 2 ($287,553,595)
1	American Pie 2 (2001)	$287,553,595			
2	American Pie (1999)	$235,483,004			
3	American Reunion (2012)	$234,989,584			
4	American Wedding (2003)	$231,449,203			

19	Final Destination	$983,938,704	6	$163,989,784	Bloodlines ($315,954,739)
1	Bloodlines (2025)	$315,954,739			
2	The Final Destination (2009)	$187,384,627			
3	Final Destination 5 (2011)	$157,887,643			
4	Final Destination 3 (2006)	$118,890,272			
5	Final Destination (2000)	$112,880,294			
6	Final Destination 2 (2003)	$90,941,129			

20	Gladiator	$927,696,965	2	$463,848,483	Gladiator ($465,516,248)
1	Gladiator (2000)	$465,516,248			
2	Gladiator II (2024)	$462,180,717			

== See also ==
- Lists of highest-grossing films
  - List of highest-grossing horror films
