= James Mangold's unrealized projects =

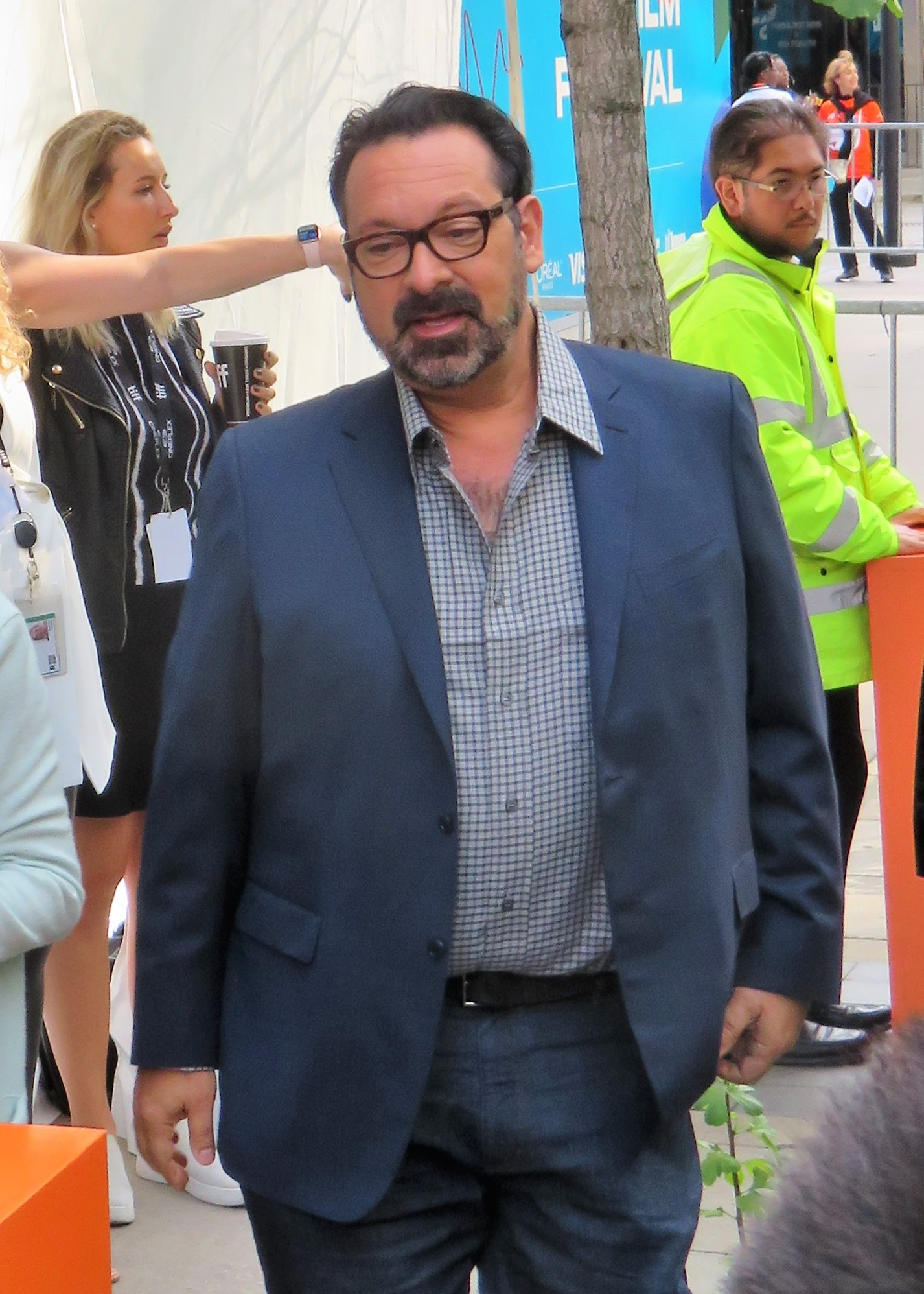
Mangold at the 2019 Toronto Film Festival

During his long career, American film director James Mangold has worked on a number of projects which never progressed beyond the pre-production stage under his direction. Some of these productions fell in development hell or were cancelled.

== 1980s ==
=== The Deacon Street Deer ===
In the mid-1980s, Mangold landed a development deal at Walt Disney Pictures, but was fired from his first directorial assignment three days into shooting. This was the ABC telepic The Deacon Street Deer, which he had envisioned as "The Red Balloon [but] set in Manhattan." The studio found Mangold's interpretation of the material "too dark" and the project went forward without him, ultimately crediting him as a story co-writer.

== 1990s ==
=== The Coloring House ===
In 1997, it was reported in Variety that Mangold's next film The Coloring House was in development at Fine Line Features. Written by Mangold, the script is a fantasy about a girl whose ability to turn paintings into reality causes the world to lose color.

== 2000s ==
=== The Rich Part of Life ===
In 2000, Columbia Pictures purchased the screen rights to Jim Kokoris' The Rich Part of Life with Mangold attached to adapt and direct the then-unpublished novel, and produce the film with Cathy Konrad. The book is told from the perspective of a young boy whose strained relationship with his stepfather undergoes dramatic changes when he wins a $190 million lottery. Mangold likened the story to that of To Kill a Mockingbird, drawing comparisons from the main character to Scout Finch, saying "There's this very wise child who tells of a year in his life that everything was turned upside down."

=== Follow Me ===
In 2003, Mangold and producer Cathy Konrad formed Tree Line Films. Mangold himself was to have directed the production banner's first project, Follow Me, based upon the short story by Paul Griner about a woman who hires a surveillance man to follow her around with a camera.

=== Murderball ===
In 2006, it was reported by TMZ that, in addition to 3:10 to Yuma, Mangold would also be developing a narrative feature based on the documentary Murderball for Lionsgate. As of 2007, screenwriter Albert Torres was penning the adaptation for Mangold to direct.

=== The Sportswriter TV miniseries ===
In 2007, HBO announced that it was adapting Richard Ford's The Sportswriter novel trilogy into a six-hour miniseries to be directed by Mangold. All six hour-long episodes were written by Mark Bomback, and Mangold and his then-wife Cathy Konrad were to executive produce through their Tree Line production banner. During an interview for MovieWeb in March, Mangold stated that he was back at work adapting The Sportswriter, Independence Day and The Lay of the Land alongside Bonback following postponement due to the WGA strike. He envisioned the series as "kind of like a man's life in America, going through family, divorce, near death experiences, problems with his children." Mangold went on to add: "We see almost every sliver of life represented on cable [television] [...] but the most underrepresented segment of American life is the heterosexual American male and how he's dealt with the changes in the late 20th Century and how he's dealing and trying to cope." Subsequently, HBO dropped their option, and any future plans to adapt the novels for the screen have been shelved.

=== Untitled family film ===
Also in 2007, while promoting 3:10 to Yuma, Mangold stated in an interview that he was "working on several scripts" including a family comedy set in Chicago which he likened to Terms of Endearment.

=== The Wolfman ===
In February 2008, Mangold was one of several directors approached to replace Mark Romanek on The Wolfman. The studio ultimately went with Joe Johnston.

=== Cyclops ===
In March 2008, it was reported that the Alexis Nolent sci-fi graphic novel Cyclops was optioned by Warner Bros. to be adapted to film by Mangold. "It is an electrifying package you find in the best sci-fi," Mangold said, "Great action sequences combined with themes that are eminently foreseeable."

=== The Archive ===
In June 2008, Mangold was announced to direct playwright David Auburn's time-travel thriller pitch of The Archive for Universal Pictures.

=== Juliet ===
In January 2009, Mangold was signed by Universal to direct Juliet, based on the novel by Danish author Anne Fortier. In 2011, Paramount acquired the rights of the movie with the writers Eyal Podell, Jonathon E. Stewart, Aryan Saha, Chad and Dara Creasey on board to develop the script.

=== Untitled courtroom drama ===
In February 2009, The Hollywood Reporter revealed that Mangold was to direct and produce an untitled true-life drama for Bold Films. Sasha Jenson and Casey La Scala, who discovered the story and brought Mangold on board, wrote the screenplay about two brothers from New Orleans who sue a multi-national company after a typhoon kills several oil rig workers in the South China Sea.

=== Three Little Words ===
In July 2009, Variety reported that Mangold was hired to direct Three Little Words, an adaptation of the memoir by Ashley Rhodes-Courter written by Lewis Colick and Michael Petroni. On May 6, 2013, Reese Witherspoon signed on for the lead role, while Amanda Seyfried was also in negotiations to co-star. The film was to have begun shooting later in September of that year, in Florida.

== 2010s ==
=== The Sandman TV series ===
In the 2010s, Mangold pitched HBO a television adaptation of Neil Gaiman's The Sandman. According to Mangold, the project never materialized due to a "Political turf war at WB".

=== Untitled Joe Namath biopic ===
In April 2010, Mangold was in early talks to direct the biopic about football quarterback Joe Namath with Jake Gyllenhaal attached to star. The first draft of the script was reported to be written by David Hollander. In May 2014, the project was again announced (with Mangold still on board as director), this time from a script by Michael Brandt and Derek Haas, who had previously penned 3:10 to Yuma for Mangold.

=== Wicked ===
In July 2010, Mangold (along with directors J. J. Abrams, Ryan Murphy and Rob Marshall), was considered to direct the film adaptation of the Broadway musical Wicked.

=== The Gunslinger ===
In December 2010, it was reported that Mangold was attached to direct The Gunslinger, a revenge thriller for New Regency written by John Hlavin. Described as a contemporary Western, the script centers on an ex-Texas Ranger who sets out to punish the men who killed his brother.

=== City State remake ===
In October 2011, Mangold was reported to be remaking the Icelandic crime thriller City State as his next film after he finished production on The Wolverine.

=== The Red Circle ===
In July 2012, it was reported that film producer Arthur M. Sarkissian approached Mangold to direct The Red Circle, the long-in-development remake of the French film Le Cercle Rouge. According to Sarkissian, the film was to begin production the following Summer and shoot in Hong Kong and Macau.

=== Cop Land TV series ===
In 2013, Deadline reported that Miramax and Starz agreed to develop and co-finance a one-hour TV version of Cop Land; Mangold and Bryan Goluboff were said to be writing the pilot script. By 2025, Variety asserted that a series based on Cop Land was still in the works, with Mangold's involvement in place. A year later, it was officially announced by Deadline that the series was in development at Paramount Television with him directing, and Robert Levine writing the script.

=== The Deep Blue Goodbye ===
On March 4, 2014, Mangold was attached to direct the film adaptation of John D. MacDonald's mystery paperback The Deep Blue Good-by which was to be produced by Leonardo DiCaprio, Jennifer Davisson-Killoran and Amy Robinson. Dana Stevens and Kario Salem wrote the first draft. On July 15, Christian Bale was attached to play the title role for the film with screenplay by Dennis Lehane. On February 25, 2015, it was reported that Rosamund Pike had landed the female lead in the film. On August 24, the production was shelved due to Bale's knee injury.

=== Blood and Champagne ===
In June 2015, Mangold was in talks to direct and develop Arash Amel's screenplay adaptation of Seducing Ingrid Bergman, a dramatization of the real-life affair between actress Ingrid Bergman and war photographer Robert Capa. The film, which Mangold wanted to eventually title Blood and Champagne, was postponed due to his involvement with Logan.

=== Captain Nemo ===
In February 2016, Mangold signed on to helm Disney's Captain Nemo, an origin story based on Jules Verne's Twenty Thousand Leagues Under the Seas that had Sebastian Gutierrez working on the latest draft. Production was to have begun in Fall of that year.

=== Laura ===
In February 2017, Mangold stated that with the introduction of Laura Kinney in Logan, there was a possibility that the character would appear in future films. Later that month, Logan producer Simon Kinberg said that a film centered around her character was in development. By October of the same year, Mangold and Craig Kyle had signed onto the project, now titled Laura, as co-screenwriters. After Disney's purchase of Fox was finalized in 2019, all X-Men films in development were stalled, leaving the future of Laura uncertain. In November 2019, Mangold said he did not think the project would be happening, and that he believed the studio would be trying to figure out where to go in the future with the characters, particularly with Wolverine.

=== The Force ===
In March 2017, Mangold was in negotiations with Fox to develop and direct an adaptation of Don Winslow's upcoming novel The Force about corrupt NYPD officers. In June 2017, David Mamet boarded the film to adapt the script. Fox set a release date for March 2019. In January 2020, Matt Damon signed on to star in the film, with Scott Frank providing rewrites.

=== Disorder remake ===
In June 2017, Mangold was named as the director of Sony's Disorder remake after reading Taylor Sheridan's draft of the film.

=== Crenshaw ===
In November 2017, it was reported that Mangold was attached to direct Crenshaw, a feature adaptation of a children's book from Newbery-winning author Katherine Applegate for Fox.

=== Untitled Patty Hearst biopic ===
On December 6, 2017, it was reported that Mangold was to direct Elle Fanning in a yet-titled Patty Hearst biopic based on author Jeffrey Toobin's American Heiress: The Wild Saga of the Kidnapping, Crimes and Trial of Patty Hearst. Mangold collaborated on the adapted script with screenwriting team Scott Alexander and Larry Karaszewski. On January 11, 2018, Fox opted not to move forward with the film after a statement Hearst made condemning Toobin's book, saying it "Romanticizes my rape and torture and calls my abduction a rollicking adventure."

=== Untitled Boba Fett film ===
In 2018, Mangold was co-writing a standalone Star Wars script, centering on the character Boba Fett, alongside Simon Kinberg who was attached to produce. The project was soon scrapped, with Lucasfilm instead shifting their focus toward the streaming series The Mandalorian. Speaking in 2023 about the project, Mangold said he envisioned it as a "borderline R-rated, single planet spaghetti Western," adding that "I was just listening to Ennio Morricone [music] all day, all night, and typing away. I'm not sure it ever would have happened. I'm not sure it was in anyone's plans, what I was thinking."

== 2020s ==
=== Untitled Buster Keaton biopic ===
In February 2022, it was announced that Mangold would direct and produce a biopic of Buster Keaton at 20th Century Studios, based on Marion Meade's biography Buster Keaton: Cut to the Chase, which executives had been looking for writers to adapt.

=== Swamp Thing ===
Around November 2022, Mangold contacted newly-appointed co-CEOs of DC Studios, James Gunn and Peter Safran, to see if there was room for a potential Swamp Thing film in their "eight-to-ten-year" DC Universe plan. Mangold envisioned the project as a standalone Gothic horror film with elements of film noir, taking inspiration from Frankenstein and RoboCop, which showed a man waking up as a monster. His interest in working on a DCU project was publicly reported the following month. By January 2023, Gunn and Safran unveiled the first projects of the DCU slate, including a new Swamp Thing film that would explore the character's origin story and be tonally different from the others. Gunn added that it would take specific inspiration from Alan Moore's 1984–85 The Saga of the Swamp Thing comic book run. After the announcement, Mangold posted a picture of Swamp Thing on social media. He was confirmed to be in negotiations to write and direct the film the next day, but was not expected to start work until after he had completed Indiana Jones and the Dial of Destiny and A Complete Unknown. In April 2023, Mangold said he had begun writing the script while simultaneously working on a planned Star Wars film, and was unsure which project would move forward first. In October 2024, Mangold stated that he wanted to shoot his Star Wars film first, however, he reiterated in December that he was unsure which one would be next due to the ongoing writing process for the Star Wars film. In February 2025, Gunn and Safran gave an update on the DCU projects being developed, with Swamp Thing said to be in "limbo" due to Mangold's schedule.

=== Star Wars: Jedi Prime ===
At Star Wars Celebration London in April 2023, Lucasfilm announced that Mangold would write and direct a Star Wars film set in the "Dawn of the Jedi" era. Mangold said that the new film would explore the origins of the Force and the first Jedi, and pitched it to studio president Kathleen Kennedy as being akin to the epic religious films Ben-Hur and The Ten Commandments. He had begun writing the script by the time of the announcement while also working on Swamp Thing for the DCU franchise, and was unsure which project would move forward first following A Complete Unknown. Beau Willimon, a writer on the Star Wars television series Andor, was hired to co-write the screenplay with Mangold in April 2024. The film—at that time referred to under the working title Star Wars: Dawn of the Jedi—was expected to be the focus for Mangold following his work on A Complete Unknown. During an interview in the following month, producer Simon Emanuel seemingly revealed the film's title as Jedi Prime. Mangold indicated in October that filming for Jedi Prime would begin in 2025. However, he reiterated in December that he was unsure which of his projects would be next due to the ongoing writing process for Jedi Prime, with he and Willimon yet to complete a draft of the script. In February 2025, Kennedy said Mangold was still working on the script and she was willing to accommodate delays from his other projects, including the impacts of A Complete Unknown's awards season. In a January 2026 Deadline interview addressing her departure from Lucasfilm, Kennedy updated that Mangold's Star Wars project was one of the most creatively ambitious, and uncertain, of those in development. Kennedy described the script as "incredible" and said it "[breaks] the mold," but revealed that it was on hold for the time being. Though she didn't rule it out permanently, it was said to be "on the back burner" and that further decisions were up to her successors, Dave Filoni and Lynwen Brennan.

=== Untitled Netflix original film ===
In May 2025, journalist Jeff Sneider revealed the news that Mangold was developing a "top secret" film at Netflix, which was further described as being a "change-of-pace" for the streamer.

=== High Side ===
In August 2025, a film package—entitled High Side, written by Jaime Oliveira—was put together at Chernin Entertainment with Mangold and Timothée Chalamet reuniting as director and star, respectively, following their work on A Complete Unknown. The project was based on an unpublished short story also by Oliveira and follows Billy, a former MotoGP racer who joins his brother in robbing banks. It was subsequently announced that Paramount Pictures had acquired the property, marking the company's first acquisition upon conclusion of the Skydance merger. Mangold and Chalamet then shot a "proof of concept" commercial for Lucid Motors, co-starring Larsen Thompson, that released in September and further teased their planned collaboration on High Side. That month, it was later announced that Mangold had secured a deal to "develop, direct and produce feature film projects" with Paramount, starting with High Side. When asked by Io9 as to whether this would effect the production of Star Wars: Jedi Prime or Swamp Thing, Mangold's representatives confirmed that he still "remain[ed] attached and available to develop all his other projects".
