= Knight and Day (soundtrack) =

Knight and Day (Original Motion Picture Soundtrack)

Film score by John Powell
- Released: June 24, 2010
- Recorded: 2010
- Studios: Newman Scoring Stage, 20th Century Fox Studios; Eastwood Scoring Stage, Warner Bros. Studios; 5 Cat
- Genre: Film score
- Length: 54:45
- Label: Varèse Sarabande
- Producer: John Powell

John Powell chronology
How to Train Your Dragon (2010)	Knight and Day (Original Motion Picture Soundtrack) (2010)	Fair Game (2010)

Knight and Day (Original Motion Picture Soundtrack) is the album consisting of the film score composed and orchestrated by John Powell, conduced by William Ross and performed by the Hollywood Studio Symphony for the 2010 satirical action comedy film Knight and Day directed by James Mangold, starring Tom Cruise and Cameron Diaz. The soundtrack was released through Varèse Sarabande on June 24, 2010.

== Critical reception ==
Filmtracks.com wrote "Powell doesn't seem to have poured a tremendous amount of effort into Knight and Day when comparing it to his concurrent projects, but it's a basically adequate, inoffensive score that may inspire his collectors in some parts." Thomas Glorieux of Maintitles.net wrote "Knight and Day of John Powell is another solid bet, and the fans will surely receive some moments they'll adore for a long time, but it also misses something that may disappoint you." Sean Wilson of MFiles wrote "Ultimately, while Knight and Day may not appear to offer anything new, it invites, as do all Powell's efforts, closer inspection to dig out all the nuances and witty touches and layers of invention. It's another fine effort from the most dynamic and versatile of modern film composers." James Christopher Monger of AllMusic wrote "Like the film itself, the Knight and Day soundtrack keeps its tongue firmly planted in its cheek." James Southall of Movie Wave, in a four-star rating called it as Powell's "most entertaining album in a couple of years". Justin Chang of Variety admitted that Powell's "surging" score outlined the film's tonal inconsistencies.

== Track listing ==
Knight and Day (Original Motion Picture Soundtrack) track listing
No.	Title	Length
1.	"At the Airport"	4:42
2.	"Rough Landing"	3:45
3.	"Trouble on I-93"	4:06
4.	"Running from Roy"	2:21
5.	"Hostage"	3:34
6.	"Car Ferry"	1:34
7.	"To the Island of Love"	4:21
8.	"In Austria"	1:32
9.	"Galley Fight"	3:38
10.	"Five Star"	2:16
11.	"June Spies"	3:28
12.	"He's a Spy"	1:13
13.	"Rooftops"	3:20
14.	"The Villa"	2:27
15.	"Reunion"	4:26
16.	"Bull Run"	4:55
17.	"Going to Cape Horn? Take a Jacket"	3:07
Total length:		54:45

== Personnel ==
Credits adapted from liner notes.

- Music composer and producer – John Powell
- Programming and arrangements – Beth Caucci, James McKee Smith, Michael John Mollo, Paul Mounsey, John Powell
- Engineer – Denis St. Amand, Ryan Robinson
- Recording – Armin Steiner
- Additional recording – Hugo Nicolson
- Recordist – Tim Lauber, Tom Hardisty, Larry Mah, Tom Hardisty
- Mixing – Hugo Nicolson
- Mixing assistance – Marc Viner
- Mastering – Patricia Sullivan Fourstar
- Score editor – David Channing, Tom Carlson
- Temp music editor – Ted Caplan
- Musical assistance – Erin McAnally, Grace Lai, Jacob Merryman, Jason Waters, John Traunwieser, Oliver Schnee
- Music supervision – Amy Driscoll
- Music coordinator – Rebecca Morellato

Orchestra

- Performer – The Hollywood Studio Symphony
- Orchestration – Dave Metzger, John Powell, Germaine Franco, Rick Giovinazzo
- Orchestra leader – John Ashton Thomas
- Conductor – William Ross
- Concertmaster – Bruce Dukov

Instrumentation

- Accordion – Nick Ariondo
- Bass – Alex Al, Ann Atkinson, Chris Kollgaard, Ed Meares, Eliseo Borrero, Frances Liu Wu, Geoff Osika, Peter Doubrovsky, Richard Feves, Steve Edelman
- Bassoon – Judy Farmer, Rose Corrigan
- Cello – Armen Ksajikian, Chris Ermacoff, Dane Little, Dennis Karmazyn, Giovanna Clayton, Miguel Martinez, Steve Erdody, Steve Richards, Trevor Handy, Victor Lawrence
- Clarinet – Ralph Williams, Stuart Clark
- Drums – Joey Waronker, Satnam Ramgotra
- Flute – Heather Clark, Steve Kujala
- French horn – Brad Warnaar, Daniel Kelley, Jim Thatcher, Jenny Kim, Justin Hageman, Nathan Campbell, Stephanie Stetson, Steve Becknell
- Guitar – Adam del Monte, Federico Ramos, George Doering, Michael Ripoll, Rodrigo y Gabriela
- Harp – Katie Kirkpatrick
- Oboe – David Weiss, Leslie Reed
- Percussion – Luis Conte
- Piano – Doug Petty, Doug Petty, Otmaro Ruiz, Randy Kerber
- Trombone – Alan Kaplan, Alex Iles, Bill Reichenbach, Charlie Loper, Phil Teele, Steve Holtman
- Trumpet – Dan Fornero, Harry Kim, Rick Baptist, Warren Luening
- Tuba – Doug Tornquist
- Viola – Alma Fernandez, Andrew Duckles, Darren McCann, Karie Prescott, Kate Reddish, Keith Greene, Lynne Richburg, Marlow Fisher, Matt Funes, Rob Brophy, Sam Formicola, Shawn Mann
- Violin – Alan Grunfeld, Ana Landauer, Armen Anassian, Bruce Dukov, Darius Campo, Dave Ewart, Eric Hosler, Eun-Mee Ahn, Irina Voloshina, Jenny Levin, Joel Pargman, Josefina Vergara, Julie Rogers, Katia Popov, Kevin Connolly, Liane Mautner, Lily Ho Chen, Lorand Lokuszta, Marc Sazer, Michele Richards, Natalie Leggett, Neel Hammond, Phil Levy, Radu Pieptea, Roberto Cani, Sara Parkins, Sarah Thornblade, Sid Page, Yelena Yegoryan, Roger Wilkie
