= Ice Age: Dawn of the Dinosaurs (soundtrack) =

Ice Age: Dawn of the Dinosaurs (Original Motion Picture Soundtrack)

Film score by John Powell
- Released: June 23, 2009
- Recorded: 2009
- Studios: Newman Scoring Stage, 20th Century Fox Studios, Los Angeles; 5 Cat Studios, Los Angeles
- Genre: Film score
- Length: 73:49
- Labels: Varèse Sarabande; Fox Music
- Producer: John Powell

John Powell chronology
| Bolt (2008) | Ice Age: Dawn of the Dinosaurs (2009) | Green Zone (2010) |

Ice Age: Dawn of the Dinosaurs (Original Motion Picture Soundtrack) is the film score to the 2009 film Ice Age: Dawn of the Dinosaurs, the third instalment in the Ice Age franchise and the sequel to Ice Age: The Meltdown (2006). The film score is composed and orchestrated by John Powell, who previously scored The Meltdown. It was released under the Varèse Sarabande label on June 23, 2009.

== Track listing ==
| No. | Title | Length |
|---|---|---|
| 1. | "Code Blue" | 1:44 |
| 2. | "Pregnant" | 1:56 |
| 3. | "Leaving the Herd" | 1:50 |
| 4. | "The Cavern" | 0:32 |
| 5. | "Magic Eggs" | 0:13 |
| 6. | "Egg Roll" | 2:08 |
| 7. | "The Cliff" | 0:18 |
| 8. | "Sid's Kids" | 1:36 |
| 9. | "Nest" | 1:21 |
| 10. | "Playground" | 1:33 |
| 11. | "Scrat Finds Furry Love^{[b]}" | 0:41 |
| 12. | "Momma" | 3:38 |
| 13. | "Entry to the Lost World" | 1:35 |
| 14. | "Dinosaur Vista" | 0:33 |
| 15. | "Meet Buck" | 2:59 |
| 16. | "Flower of Death" | 2:48 |
| 17. | "Nose Job" | 1:34 |
| 18. | "Trek" | 0:59 |
| 19. | "Chasm of Death" | 0:21 |
| 20. | "Big Smelly Crack" | 3:09 |
| 21. | "We Shall Raise Them Vegetarian" | 2:19 |
| 22. | "Campfire Stories" | 1:18 |
| 23. | "Flashback" | 1:02 |
| 24. | "Nite Nite" | 0:45 |
| 25. | "You'll Never Tango^{[b]}" | 0:47 |
| 26. | "Herd Crossing" | 0:36 |
| 27. | "Plates of Woe" | 3:57 |
| 28. | "Battle Cry" | 0:16 |
| 29. | "Buck's Theme" | 0:38 |
| 30. | "Battles" | 4:04 |
| 31. | "Over the Falls" | 0:13 |
| 32. | "Rescues" | 3:33 |
| 33. | "Alone Again" (performed by Chad Fischer) | 1:55 |
| 34. | "To the Portal" | 0:54 |
| 35. | "Rudy Fight" | 2:12 |
| 36. | "Farewell" | 1:41 |
| 37. | "Out Of This World" | 0:32 |
| 38. | "Buck Returns" | 1:07 |
| 39. | "Welcome to the Ice Age" | 1:58 |
| 40. | "At Home With the Scrats^{[b]}" | 0:26 |
| 41. | "The Call Of The Siren Acorn^{[c]}" | 0:16 |
| 42. | "True Love for Our Hero^{[c]}" | 0:23 |
| 43. | "End Credits" | 7:00 |
| 44. | "You'll Never Find Another Love Like Mine (performed by Lou Rawls)" | 4:25 |
| Total length: | | 73:45 |

== Reception ==
Filmtracks wrote "The overall impression Powell leaves is one of workmanlike craftsmanship. You can't fault him for providing this effective music, but for those who don't pay close attention to the slight variations in these types of works, all of it will continue to sound the same. Approach its extremely lengthy album (a hindrance here, perhaps) only if you maintain a healthy collection of Powell's streamlined music for the genre." Jonathan Broxton of Movie Music UK wrote "The style is so all-over the place, jumping from pastiche to pastiche, with excellent moments sometimes lasting no longer than 30 or 40 seconds, it's frustrating to sit and listen to." Joe Leydon of Variety considered the score as "enjoyable". Ben Simon of Animated Views wrote "Even composer John Powell, taking over from the original's David Newman, provides some less cookie-cutter cues than he does for his DreamWorks movies, and several times through the movie the music called attention to itself for all the right reasons as opposed to being shoehorned in. I might even say that this is Powell's best animation work in a long while."

== Personnel ==
Credits adapted from liner notes:

- Music composer and producer – John Powell
- Music programming and arrangements – John Powell, James McKee Smith, Michael John Mollo, Paul Mounsey, Simon Greenaway
- Score recordist – Tim Lauber
- Digital recordist – Erik Swanson
- Recording – Shawn Murphy
- Mixing – Shawn Murphy, Marc Gebauer
- Mixing assistant – Marc Viner
- Mastering – Patricia Sullivan Fourstar
- Score editor – David Channing
- Music editor – Tom Carlson
- Technician – Denis St. Amand
- Music coordinator – Rebecca Morellato, Germaine Franco
- Music assistant – Beth Caucci
- Music consultant – Koji Egawa
- Copyist – JoAnn Kane Music Service, Mark Graham
- Executive producer – Robert Townson

Orchestra

- Performer – Hollywood Studio Symphony
- Conductor – Pete Anthony
- Orchestrators – Conrad Pope, Dave Metzger, John Powell, John Ashton Thomas, Kevin Kliesch, Pete Anthony, Randy Kerber, Rick Giovinazzo, James McKee Smith, Michael John Mollo, Paul Mounsey, Simon Greenaway
- Orchestra contractor – Gina Zimmitti
- Assistant orchestra contractor – Chrissy Brantley
- Choir conductor and contractor – Edie Lehmann Boddicker
- Stage manager – Dominic Gonzales, Tom Steel, Stacey Robinson
- Concertmaster – Bruce Dukov

Instruments

- Accordion – Nick Ariando, Frank Marocco
- Bass – Gus Seyffert
- Celesta – Randy Kerber
- Drums – Joey Waronker
- Dulcimer – George Doering
- Guitar – Gus Seyffert, George Doering, Zac Rae
- Piano – Randy Kerber, Zac Rae
- Trumpet – Uan Rasey
- Violin – Roger Wilkie

Management

- Music clearance for 20th Century Fox – Ellen Ginsburg
- Music business affairs for 20th Century Fox – Tom Cavanaugh
- Executive in charge of music for 20th Century Fox – Robert Kraft
- Music supervisor for 20th Century Fox – Mike Knobloch

== Accolades ==
| Award | Category | Recipient | Result | Ref. |
|---|---|---|---|---|
| Annie Awards | Best Music in a Feature Production | John Powell | Nominated | |
| ASCAP Film and Television Music Awards | Top Box Office Films | John Powell | Won | |
| Ivor Novello Awards | Best Original Film Score | John Powell | Won | |
| World Soundtrack Awards | Soundtrack Composer of the Year (Note: also for How to Train Your Dragon, Green Zone and Knight and Day (all 2010)) | John Powell | Nominated | |

== Notes ==
- ^{^b} Contains an interpolation of "You'll Never Find Another Love Like Mine" written by Kenneth Gamble and Leon Huff
- ^{^b} Contains an interpolation of "Adiago From Spartacus" written by Aram Khachaturian
