= Green Zone (soundtrack) =

Green Zone (Original Motion Picture Soundtrack)

Film score by John Powell
- Released: March 9, 2010
- Recorded: 2009–2010
- Studio: AIR Studios, London; 5 Cat Studios, Los Angeles
- Genre: Film score
- Length: 52:41
- Label: Varèse Sarabande
- Producer: John Powell

John Powell chronology
Ice Age: Dawn of the Dinosaurs (2009)	Green Zone (2010)	How to Train Your Dragon (2010)

Green Zone (Original Motion Picture Soundtrack) is the film score to the 2010 film Green Zone directed by Paul Greengrass, starring Matt Damon. The film score is composed by John Powell, who previously collaborated with Greengrass on the first three films of the Bourne franchise and United 93 (2006). The score was released under the Varèse Sarabande record label on March 9, 2010.

== Track listing ==
No.	Title	Length
1.	"Opening Book"	2:32
2.	"1st WMD Raid"	2:39
3.	"Traffic Jam"	2:59
4.	"Meeting Raid"	4:33
5.	"Helicopter/Freddy Runs"	2:43
6.	"Questions"	3:25
7.	"Miller Googles"	1:55
8.	"Truth/Magellan/Attack"	3:50
9.	"Mobilize / Find Al Rawi"	5:17
10.	"Evac Preps Part 1"	8:36
11.	"Evac Preps Part 2"	3:24
12.	"Attack and Chase"	5:26
13.	"WTF"	1:16
14.	"Chaos/Email"	4:17
Total length:		52:41

== Reception ==
Filmtracks wrote "Green Zone will be too percussively abrasive for some listeners, but if you accept Powell's trademark sound in this genre as a viable approach to modern day thrillers, then it's hard to imagine a more effectively propulsive and dauntingly oppressive work than this." James Christopher Monger of AllMusic wrote "Powell may not establish much of a melodic presence this time around, but the tense, tribal rhythm loop that weaves itself throughout the soundtrack's entirety will stay in your bones for days." Kirk Honeycutt of The Hollywood Reporter wrote "John Powell's propulsive music eggs the action ever forward". Todd McCarthy of Variety called the score "pulsating".

Lisa Kennedy of The Denver Post wrote "John Powell provides a thriller-esque score". Tim Robey of The Daily Telegraph wrote "John Powell's thunderous score getting a little exhausting". Anthony Lane of The New Yorker found it "insanely drum-heavy" reminded of the islanders in King Kong (2005).

== Accolades ==
Award	Date of ceremony	Category	Recipients	Result
ASCAP Film and Television Music Awards	24 June 2011	Top Box Office Films	John Powell	Won
World Soundtrack Academy	23 October 2010	Soundtrack Composer of the Year	John Powell (Note: also for Ice Age: Dawn of the Dinosaurs (2009), How to Train Your Dragon and Knight and Day (both 2010))	Nominated

== Personnel ==
Credits adapted from AllMusic:

- Adam Miller – Assistant Engineer
- Angus O'Sullivan – Orchestration
- Ariel Campos – Drum Samples, Percussion Sampling
- Beth Caucci – Drum Samples, Percussion Sampling
- Brian Boyce – Drum Samples, Percussion Sampling
- Chris Barrett – Assistant Engineer
- Daniel Baker – Orchestration
- Frank Elliot – Drum Samples, Percussion Sampling
- Gavin Greenaway – Conductor
- Germaine Franco – Drum Samples, Percussion Sampling, Score Production Coordinator
- Harry Garfield – Executive in Charge of Music
- Hugo Nicolson – Mixing, Recording
- Isobel Griffiths – Orchestra Contractor
- James McKee Smith – Arranger, Orchestration, Programming
- Jessica Wells – Orchestration
- Joey Waronker – Drum Samples, Percussion Sampling
- John Ashton Thomas – Orchestration
- John Powell – Composer, Primary Artist, Producer
- Jon Olive – Music Editor
- Kevin Shah – Drum Samples, Percussion Sampling
- Kirk Brundage – Drum Samples, Percussion Sampling
- Laura Bishop – Orchestration
- Leo Abrahams – Guitar
- Marc Viner – Assistant Engineer
- Michael John Mollo – Arranger, Orchestration, Programming
- Nick Wollage – Recording
- Patricia Sullivan Fourstar – Mastering
- Paul Mounsey – Arranger, Orchestration, Programming
- Perry Montague-Mason – Leader
- Peter Myles – Supervising Music Editor
- Robert Townson – Executive Producer
- Ryoji Inatsugi – Drum Samples, Percussion Sampling
- Satnam Ramgotra – Drum Samples, Percussion Sampling
- Vivian Milanova – Guitar
