= Identity (2003 film) =

2003 film by James Mangold

- Theatrical release poster
- Directed by: James Mangold
- Written by: Michael Cooney
- Produced by: Cathy Konrad
- Starring: John Cusack; Ray Liotta; Amanda Peet; Alfred Molina; Clea DuVall; Rebecca De Mornay; John Hawkes; John C. McGinley; William Lee Scott; Jake Busey; Pruitt Taylor Vince
- Cinematography: Phedon Papamichael Jr.
- Edited by: David Brenner
- Music by: Alan Silvestri
- Production companies: Columbia Pictures; Konrad Pictures
- Distributed by: Sony Pictures Releasing
- Release date: April 25, 2003
- Running time: 90 minutes
- Country: United States
- Language: English
- Budget: $28 million
- Box office: $90.3 million

Identity is a 2003 American psychological slasher film directed by James Mangold, written by Michael Cooney, and featuring an ensemble cast including John Cusack, Ray Liotta, Amanda Peet, Alfred Molina, Clea DuVall, William Lee Scott, Rebecca De Mornay, Jake Busey, John C. McGinley, and Pruitt Taylor Vince. The film follows ten strangers stranded at an isolated motel in the Nevada desert during a rainstorm, who are mysteriously murdered one by one by an unknown assailant. Several events that take place in the hours before the characters' arrival are introduced at key moments in the film using reverse chronology structure and, in a parallel story, a serial killer awaits a verdict at a crucial trial that will determine whether he will be executed for his crimes.

Cooney's screenplay for Identity was inspired by Agatha Christie's 1939 whodunit And Then There Were None. Principal photography took place largely on studio sets in Culver City, California in 2002, with location photography occurring in Palmdale.

Identity was released by Sony Pictures Releasing on April 25, 2003. The film received positive reviews from critics and grossed $90.3 million against a $28 million budget.

== Plot ==
In early May 2002, a last-minute midnight hearing is held before serial killer Malcolm Rivers' scheduled execution the next day. A tape of Malcolm reciting the poem "Antigonish" is played. Journals belonging to Malcolm are discovered having been misfiled in the case evidence, which were not introduced during his trial. Malcolm's psychiatrist, Dr. Malick, and his defense attorney argue for a stay of execution, asserting that the journals prove his insanity.

Meanwhile, during a torrential rainstorm, ten strangers become stranded at a remote Nevada motel run by Larry Washington. The group consists of limousine driver and former police officer Ed Dakota, who is transporting washed-up actress Caroline Suzanne; Samuel Rhodes, a correctional officer transporting convicted murderer Robert Maine; prostitute Paris Nevada; newlyweds Lou and Ginny Isiana; and another couple, George York, his nine-year-old stepson Timmy, and wife Alice, the latter of whom was severely injured when Ed accidentally struck her on the highway.

Suzanne is murdered by an unknown assailant. Ed discovers her severed head in a dryer, along with her motel key, numbered 10. The escaped Maine is suspected to be the killer. Ginny locks herself in the bathroom during a fight with Lou while an unknown assailant murders him in their room. While photographing Lou's body, Ed finds the number 9 key in his hand. Ed deduces the killer is counting down and targeting them by room order. Maine attempts to escape but is captured by Rhodes. When Maine is discovered dead with the number 8 key under Larry's supervision, Ed and Rhodes accuse Larry of being the killer. In a panic, Larry attempts to flee in his truck, fatally striking George in the process.

Rhodes subdues Larry, tying him to a chair, and orders the others to stay together until dawn. Larry convinces Paris and Ed that he is not the perpetrator. The bedridden Alice is subsequently found dead, presumably from her injuries; Rhodes finds the number 6 key near her. When George's body is recovered, the number 7 key is in his pocket. The superstitious Ginny theorizes the deaths are supernatural in origin, caused by Native American burial grounds on the hotel property. Ed urges Ginny and Timmy to flee in a car, but it explodes upon their arrival, seemingly killing them both. The remaining four discover that all the victims' bodies have disappeared, before learning all of them share the same birthday, May 10th. Ed also observes that each are named after a U.S. state.

Meanwhile, at the hearing, Malick indicates that Malcolm suffers from dissociative identity disorder, harboring ten distinct alternate personalities, and is thus unaware of his crimes. Malcolm arrives at the hearing, bound to a chair. It is revealed that each of the individuals at the motel are abstractions of Malcolm's personalities, which Malick is, through an experimental psychiatric treatment, attempting to bring together, triggering the homicidal personality to kill off the others and reveal itself.

At the motel, Paris finds convict-transportation files for both Maine and Rhodes in the police car, revealing that Rhodes is a criminal who has disguised himself as an officer after murdering one. When Paris attempts to warn Larry, Rhodes attacks. Larry intervenes, but is shot to death by Rhodes. Ed subsequently opens fire, and the two kill each other in the process.

With all of Malcolm's personalities seemingly destroyed, Malick's psychological experiment successfully results in Malcolm's execution being stayed. Malcolm mysteriously tells Malick and the officials, "I saw you in an orange grove." En route to the psychiatric hospital, Malcolm envisions Paris as she settles down in her hometown of Frostproof, Florida, tending her orange grove. In the grove, she uncovers key number 1 in the dirt, and is approached by Timmy; Timmy was in fact the murderous personality who orchestrated all of the motel deaths and faked his own. Malcolm begs Timmy to spare Paris, but Timmy completely takes over, killing her with a hand rake. When Malick notices something is awry, he opens the safety grate inside the patrol car. Malcolm attacks, strangling Malick and the driver before the van swerves off the road and comes to a stop. Timmy's voice repeats "Antigonish" once more.

== Cast ==
- John Cusack as Edward “Ed” Dakota, a limousine driver and former Los Angeles police officer
- Ray Liotta as Samuel Rhodes, a correctional officer transporting Maine, a convicted murderer
- Amanda Peet as Paris Nevada, a prostitute leaving Las Vegas to buy a citrus grove in Florida
- John Hawkes as Larry Washington, the motel manager
- Alfred Molina as Dr. Malick, Malcolm Rivers' psychiatrist
- Clea DuVall as Ginny Isiana, a superstitious newlywed
- John C. McGinley as George York, Alice's husband and Timmy's stepfather
- William Lee Scott as Lou Isiana, Ginny's husband
- Jake Busey as Robert Maine, a convicted murderer being transported by Rhodes
- Pruitt Taylor Vince as Malcolm Rivers, a convicted mass murderer
- Rebecca DeMornay as Caroline Suzanne, an '80's Hollywood TV actress chauffeured by Ed
- Carmen Argenziano as Defense Lawyer and Attorney
- Marshall Bell as District Attorney
- Leila Kenzle as Alice York, George's wife and Timmy's mother who is injured in a car collision by Ed
- Matt Letscher as Assistant District Attorney
- Bret Loehr as Timmy York, Alice's son and George's stepson
- Holmes Osborne as Judge Taylor
- Frederick Coffin as Detective Varole
- Stuart M. Besser as Frozen-body, Larry

== Production ==
=== Development ===
Producer Cathy Konrad brought the screenplay for Identity to her then-husband, James Mangold, who had been wanting to direct a thriller film. The screenplay, written by British playwright Michael Cooney, was inspired by Agatha Christie's 1939 whodunit novel And Then There Were None.

Mangold stated in an interview prior to the film's release that he was attracted to a claustrophobic thriller because "I don't see this as a genre that's tapped out at this point. You can make it sound dead end but these remain some of the most cinematic films ever made, whether you're talking about Rear Window, The Others, Polanski's Knife in the Water, Dead Calm, Carpenter's The Thing, Alien, huge piles of great films that buck conventional wisdom that a movie should be cinematically broad like a Lawrence of Arabia."

=== Casting ===
Actor John Cusack was pursued for the lead because Mangold and producer Cathy Konrad both felt he was perfect for the role. As Mangold said in another interview, “When you think of movies like The Grifters, you don't feel like it's such a stretch. I'd met John a few times and there's this great 'Everyman' sense to him. And while there's this great warmth to him, especially as he's grown older, there's also a simplicity, a gravity to him. There's something very solid about John."

Upon being offered the role and sent the script, Cusack stated "I started reading and I thought 'alright well, we'll see how this thing goes', then on page 30 I thought I had it pegged and I didn't. And then on page 50 I thought I had figured it out, but I didn't … and then I kept going this way, and then by the end of it I really hadn't seen any of those things coming. So I thought 'man, that's pretty seamless' because you know I should have figured this out." During an appearance on CBS's The Early Show, Cusack summarized his thoughts by saying "It was one of the most clever scripts I've read in a long time."

Mangold offered the role of serial killer Malcolm Rivers to Pruitt Taylor Vince, who had played the lead in Mangold's feature film debut, Heavy (1995); Vince accepted the role. Clea DuVall, who was cast as Ginny, had also previously worked with Mangold, portraying a psychiatric patient in his 1999 film Girl, Interrupted.

=== Filming ===
The majority of the film was shot on Stage 27 at Sony Pictures Studios in Culver City, California, with Mangold estimating that "95% of the film" was shot on constructed sets. Mangold used production designer Mark Friedberg to transform the sound stage into a complex set with endless rain, featuring a motel with a swimming pool, 14 rooms, and surrounding desert. Filming also took place on location at the Four Aces Movie Ranch in Palmdale, which features the motel from which Stage 27 was modeled, Los Angeles City Hall in Los Angeles, and other exterior locations in Palmdale and Lancaster.

== Music ==
Angelo Badalamenti was originally signed to score the film, but his music was replaced with a new score by Alan Silvestri.

== Release ==
Identity opened on April 25, 2003, in the United States and Canada in 2,733 theaters.

=== Home media ===
Sony Pictures Home Entertainment released Identity on VHS and as a special edition DVD on September 2, 2003, featuring a theatrical and extended cut of the film. Sony released a Blu-ray edition on April 3, 2007.

Arrow Video released a special edition 4K UHD Blu-ray in the United States and Canada on August 25, 2026.

== Reception ==
=== Box office ===
The film ranked at #1 on its opening weekend, accumulating $16,225,263, with a per theater average of $5,936. The film's five-day gross was $18,677,884.

The film dropped down to #3 on its second weekend, behind newly released X2 and The Lizzie McGuire Movie, accumulating $9,423,662 in a 41.9% drop from its first weekend, and per theater average of $3,448. By its third weekend, it dropped down to #4 and made $6,477,585, $2,474 per theater average.

Identity went on to gross $52.1 million in the United States and Canada and $38.1 million overseas. In total, the film has grossed over $90 million worldwide, making it a box office success against its $28 million budget.

=== Critical response ===
On review aggregator website Rotten Tomatoes, the film has an approval rating of 63% based on 168 reviews, with an average rating of 6.40/10. The site's consensus states: "Identity is a film that will divide audiences—the twists of its plot will either impress or exasperate you." On Metacritic, the film has a weighted average score of 64 out of 100 based on 34 reviews, indicating "generally favorable" reviews. Audiences polled by CinemaScore gave the film an average grade of "B" on an A+ to F scale.

Roger Ebert gave the film three stars out of four and wrote, "I've seen a lot of movies that are intriguing for the first two acts and then go on autopilot with a formula ending. Identity is a rarity, a movie that seems to be on autopilot for the first two acts and then reveals that it was not, with a third act that causes us to rethink everything that has gone before. Ingenious, how simple and yet how devious the solution is." A. O. Scott of The New York Times gave a mixed review, describing the film as "a piece of elegant directorial hackwork by James Mangold, [who] goes through its generic paces with enough flair and mystery to keep you moderately entertained. The apparent premise, creaky though it may be, holds ample opportunity for suspense and second-guessing, and Mr. Mangold handles the revelations and reversals of Michael Cooney's script with nerve-racking aplomb."

Andrew O'Hehir of Salon praised the film, describing it as "so ingeniously constructed that these meta-noir ingredients feel dizzyingly enjoyable, never hackneyed. In fact, the overheated melodrama of Identity is crucial to its method—and the key, in some ways, to its narrative secrets." Mick LaSalle of SFGate reported, "At first, Identity seems like nothing more than a pleasing and blatant homage (i.e., rip-off) to the Agatha Christie-style thriller where marooned guests realize that a murderer is in their midst... we've seen it before. Yet make no mistake. Identity is more than an entertaining thriller. It's a highly original one."

The Village Voice's Dennis Lim wrote of the film's premise, "The premise of the one-rainy-night thriller Identity seems like mothballed Agatha Christie," and of the film's third act twist, "The ultimate cliché of plot-twist implausibility, the crucial revelation is so outlandishly fatuous it might have given Donald Kaufman pause. But there's nothing self-parodic about Identity—the viewer must not only swallow the nullifying third-act bombshell but actually re-engage with the movie on its new, extremely dubious terms."

Brian McKay of eFilmCritic.com wrote, "This film's cardinal sin was not that it had an engrossing but extremely far-fetched setup to a lackluster resolution—a resolution that probably sounded good during the initial script pitch, but which nobody realized was going to be such a misfire until the production was already at the point of no return. No, what Identity is guilty of most is bad timing—it simply gives away too much, too soon. At about the halfway mark (if not much sooner), the film's big "twist" will finally dawn on you (and if it doesn't, they'll end up coming right out and saying it five minutes later anyway). And once it does, you will no longer care what happens afterward."

=== Accolades ===
Award/association	Year	Category	Recipient(s) and nominee(s)	Result	Ref.
Bram Stoker Awards	2003	Best Screenplay	Michael Cooney	Nominated	
Golden Schmoes Awards	2004	Best Screenplay	Michael Cooney	Nominated	
Golden Schmoes Awards	2004	Most Underrated Movie of the Year		Won	
Golden Schmoes Awards	2004	Trippiest Movie of the Year		Nominated	
Golden Schmoes Awards	2004	Best Horror Movie of the Year		Nominated	
Golden Schmoes Awards	2004	Biggest Surprise of the Year		Nominated	
Golden Schmoes Awards	2004	Favorite Movie Poster of the Year		Nominated	
Golden Trailer Awards	2004	Best Trailer – Horror/Thriller		Nominated	
International Horror Guild Awards	2004	Best Film		Nominated	
Saturn Awards	2004	Best Action, Adventure or Thriller Film		Nominated	
Saturn Awards	2004	Best DVD Special Edition Release		Nominated	
Teen Choice Awards	2003	Choice Movie — Horror/Thriller		Nominated	

== Legacy ==
Since its release, the film gained a small following. In 2017, Mangold said he's very "proud" of the movie:

"I love Identity, I love it. In fact, I think some of the filmmaking, the craftsmanship, the image making, is such that I'm very proud of it. Interestingly, when Adaptation (2002) came out, and there's a joke in the movie about someone with split personality, that came out right before Identity. You know the joke? Nic Cage is working on this crazy idea for a movie, the idea that the killer has multiple personalities, and Adaptation came out about three months before Identity. When I saw Adaptation, I realized I was dead. Half the reviews of Identity were going, like, this is the movie about the stupid joke, someone made a movie of the joke in Adaptation. And it was crushing, honestly, it was crushing because I spent a year and a half working on the movie, and it was kind of like half of the reviews were calling it silly. But part of what I loved about Identity, and maybe you too, was that it was so crazy, that it was just a completely crazy movie. And the freedom of the concept meant that you could exist in a more dreamy, fever-dream space with the film, which was very freeing to me, to be this kind of noir And Then There Were None amped up to eleven on the volume knob. It was very exciting for me, and hugely enjoyable, and I'm very proud of the movie."

== Remake ==
Khamoshh... Khauff Ki Raat (transl. Silence... Night of Fear) is a 2005 Indian Hindi-language mystery thriller film was a copycat remake of Identity.
