= How to Train Your Dragon (2010 soundtrack) =

2010 film soundtrack album

How to Train Your Dragon: Music from the Motion Picture

Soundtrack album by John Powell
- Released: March 23, 2010; December 4, 2020 (Deluxe Edition)
- Recorded: 2010
- Genre: Soundtrack
- Length: 72:12; 105 minutes (Deluxe Edition)
- Label: Varèse Sarabande
- Producer: John Powell

John Powell chronology
| Green Zone (2010) | How to Train Your Dragon (2010) | Knight and Day (2010) |

Singles from How to Train Your Dragon: Music from the Motion Picture
- 1. "Sticks & Stones" Released: March 23, 2010

How to Train Your Dragon: Music from the Motion Picture is a soundtrack album composed by John Powell for the film of the same name and released by Varèse Sarabande on March 23, 2010. The score earned Powell his first Academy Award nomination and his third BAFTA nomination, which he lost to The Social Network and The King's Speech, respectively. The score also won the International Film Music Critics Association 2011 Awards for Best Original Score for an Animated Feature and Film Score of the Year, and was nominated twice for Film Music Composition of the Year for the tracks "Forbidden Friendship" and "Test Drive". The soundtrack received wide acclaim from professional music critics.

The Japanese version uses a J-pop song called "Emerald" written by Becky.

== Background ==
How to Train Your Dragon was composer John Powell's sixth collaboration with DreamWorks Animation. Powell had scored many of DreamWorks' previous films, but this was the first of DreamWorks' films where Powell helmed the score on his own (on his previous efforts with DreamWorks, he had collaborated with other composers such as Harry Gregson-Williams and Hans Zimmer). Zimmer had long praised Powell's abilities, and on many occasions, asserted that he was the superior composer between them, thus firmly supporting Powell's solo animation effort.

Icelandic singer Jónsi was brought on to write and record the song "Sticks & Stones", which plays during the end credits of the film. Director Dean DeBlois had previously worked with Jónsi before, directing a concert film for his band Sigur Rós entitled Heima, and a companion film for his album Go entitled Go Quiet.

In an interview with The Wrap's Steve Pond, Powell talked about his intent for the score:

"I was certainly trying to get a bit more epic. I just felt the animation and the visuals were giving me a broader palette to play with. As a kid I remember watching The Vikings with Tony Curtis and Kirk Douglas, and I always liked that score.

[The directors] were really very specific a lot of the time. They did want size and depth and emotion. They wanted a feeling of the Nordic musical past. You could say the symphonic musical past was Nielsen, the Danish symphonist. Sibelius. Grieg to a certain extent, although I think he was a little bit more Germanic than he was Nordic.

Sibelius was the key. I studied a lot of Sibelius as a kid, and I've always adored his music. So that, plus it was great to have Jónsi do a song at the end of the movie, because I've always liked Sigur Rós. They were an influence as well, even though that seems paradoxical. But there is that in a few cues—heavy, dark guitar textures going on at the same time as large orchestration.

We looked at all the folk music from the Nordic areas. And I'm part Scottish and grew up with a lot of Scottish folk music, so that came into it a lot. And Celtic music was something that Jeffrey [Katzenberg] felt had this very attractive quality to it, and a sweetness, that he thought would be wonderful for the film."

== Track listings ==
All music is composed by John Powell.

2010 Original Release
| No. | Title | Length |
|---|---|---|
| 1. | "This Is Berk" | 4:10 |
| 2. | "Dragon Battle" | 1:54 |
| 3. | "The Downed Dragon" | 4:16 |
| 4. | "Dragon Training" | 3:10 |
| 5. | "Wounded" | 1:25 |
| 6. | "The Dragon Book" | 2:22 |
| 7. | "Focus, Hiccup!" | 2:05 |
| 8. | "Forbidden Friendship" | 4:10 |
| 9. | "New Tail" | 2:47 |
| 10. | "See You Tomorrow" | 3:53 |
| 11. | "Test Drive" | 2:36 |
| 12. | "Not So Fireproof" | 1:12 |
| 13. | "This Time for Sure" | 0:43 |
| 14. | "Astrid Goes for a Spin" | 0:43 |
| 15. | "Romantic Flight" | 1:56 |
| 16. | "Dragon's Den" | 2:29 |
| 17. | "The Cove" | 1:10 |
| 18. | "The Kill Ring" | 4:28 |
| 19. | "Ready the Ships" | 5:13 |
| 20. | "Battling the Green Death" | 6:18 |
| 21. | "Counter Attack" | 3:05 |
| 22. | "Where's Hiccup?" | 2:43 |
| 23. | "Coming Back Around" | 2:51 |
| 24. | "Sticks & Stones" (Written and Performed by Jónsi) | 4:17 |
| 25. | "The Vikings Have Their Tea" | 2:03 |
| Total length: | | 72:12 |

=== Deluxe Edition ===
The Deluxe Edition of the score was released on December 4, 2020, featuring additional tracks, demos, and alternate versions.

Disc 1
| No. | Title | Length |
|---|---|---|
| 1. | "This is Berk (Alternate Film Version) [1m2alt]" | 1:05 |
| 2. | "This Is Berk (with Original Opening Version) [1m2]" | 6:10 |
| 3. | "Anybody See That? [1m6]" | 1:24 |
| 4. | "War Room [1m7a]" | 0:44 |
| 5. | "Training Out There [1m7b-c]" | 4:23 |
| 6. | "Hiccup Comes Home [2m8]" | 0:23 |
| 7. | "Dragon Training [2m9]" | 3:09 |
| 8. | "Wounded [2m10]" | 1:27 |
| 9. | "The Dragon Book [2m11]" | 2:44 |
| 10. | "Hiccup Focus [2m12]" | 2:05 |
| 11. | "Offering [2m13]" | 0:53 |
| 12. | "Forbidden Friendship [2m14]" | 4:13 |
| 13. | "New Tail [2m15]" | 2:48 |
| 14. | "Teamwork [3m16]" | 0:44 |
| 15. | "Charming The Pziiffelback [3m17]" | 0:28 |
| 16. | "See You Tomorrow [3m18]" | 3:53 |
| 17. | "Test Drive [3m20]" | 2:35 |
| 18. | "Not So Fireproof [3m21]" | 1:13 |
| 19. | "This Time For Sure [3m22]" | 0:46 |
| 20. | "Astrid Finds Toothless [3m23]" | 0:39 |
| 21. | "Astrid Goes For A Spin [3m24]" | 0:47 |
| 22. | "Romantic Flight [3m25]" | 1:56 |
| 23. | "Dragon's Den [3m26b]" | 2:31 |
| 24. | "Let's Find Dad [3m26c]" | 1:12 |
| 25. | "Kill Ring/Stop The Fight [4m27-28]" | 4:31 |

Disc 2
| No. | Title | Length |
|---|---|---|
| 1. | "Not A Viking [4m30]" | 1:34 |
| 2. | "Ready/Confront [4m31]" | 5:19 |
| 3. | "Relax/Stroke/Hell [4m33-34]" | 2:09 |
| 4. | "Over/Less Okay [4m35-37]" | 6:19 |
| 5. | "Wings [4m38]" | 1:19 |
| 6. | "Counter Attack [5m39]" | 1:52 |
| 7. | "Where's Hiccup? [5m40]" | 2:54 |
| 8. | "Coming Back Around [5m41]" | 2:50 |
| 9. | "Sticks & Stones" (Written and Performed by Jónsi) | 4:17 |
| 10. | "The Vikings Have Their Tea [5m50]" | 2:06 |
| 11. | "The Vikings Have Their Tea (Alternate Version) [5m50alt]" | 2:02 |
| 12. | "This Is Berk (Demo) [1m2]" | 6:11 |
| 13. | "New Tail (Demo) [2m15]" | 2:54 |
| 14. | "See You Tomorrow (Demo) [3m18]" | 3:54 |
| 15. | "Test Drive (Demo) [3m20]" | 2:33 |
| 16. | "Romantic Flight (Demo) [3m25]" | 1:57 |
| 17. | "Coming Back Around (Demo) [5m41]" | 2:53 |
| Total length: | | 105:46 |

== Composition ==
The score has traditional Scottish influences, and uses instruments such as the fiddle, bagpipes, uilleann pipes, Great Irish warpipes and pennywhistle. The soundtrack is 79 minutes long.

=== Orchestration ===
The instrumentation of the score includes 3 flutes, 3 oboes, 3 clarinets, 3 bassoons, 12 French horns, 4 trumpets, 6 trombones, tuba, timpani, 8 percussionists, 2 harps, piano doubling celeste, SATB choir, and a string section of 30 violins, 12 violas, 10 celli and 8 double basses. Woodwind players also double on piccolo, english horn, bass and contrabass clarinets, and contrabassoon. Other instruments used include the sopilka and Irish flute, hammered dulcimer, gadulka, esraj, yaylı tambur, hurdy-gurdy, accordion, harmonium, Hardanger fiddle, acoustic and electric guitar, and the aforementioned fiddle, bagpipes, uilleann pipes, warpipes and pennywhistle.

The score calls for over 30 percussion instruments. Drums include 5 snare drums of various types, 4 bass drums, 2 goblet drums, 2 surdos, a "small low drum", repinique, a dhol, various brekete, and concert tom-toms; pitched instruments include a glockenspiel, vibraphone, chimes, crotales, marimba, bass marimba, 3 slate marimbas, and 2 glass marimbas. Other percussion used include various cymbals, 4 gongs, an anvil, 2 sleigh bells, tambourine, mark tree, triangle, 2 shakers, garbage cans, and a pot.

=== Musical themes ===
Powell states that he "presents almost all his themes within the first five minutes of the film". "Hiccup's Theme" is introduced immediately in the film version of "This is Berk", played by brass; this theme is often accompanied by an eighth note ostinato (Toothless's Theme), for example shortly into "Test Drive". "The Vikings Theme" is introduced shortly thereafter, played by a solo bassoon, after which a second interpretation of Hiccup's theme is played by wind instruments.

About one minute into the original opening version of "This is Berk", the music modulates via fast triplet arpeggios into the "warring Vikings" theme, which has Scottish influences. At about 3:15, the "fun Vikings" theme is first introduced on solo clarinet backed by pizzicato strings. Warpipes introduce the "dragon tune" around 4:15, which is played by low brass.

== Critical reception ==
Professional ratings
Review scores
| Source | Rating |
|---|---|
| AllMusic | 4.5/5 stars |
| Film Music Magazine | A |
| Film Score Click Track | 5/5 stars |
| Filmtracks | 5/5 stars |
| MovieCues | Favorable |
| Movie Music UK | 5/5 stars |
| Tracksounds | 10/10 stars |

The score was exceptionally well-received, earning universal praise from professional film score critics and fans alike. Powell earned a BAFTA nomination for his work as well as his first Oscar nomination, losing both nominations to Alexandre Desplat for his score for The King's Speech and to Trent Reznor and Atticus Ross for their score for The Social Network, respectively. The music also won an Annie Award for the Best Music in a Feature Production from the International Animated Film Association, ASIFA-Hollywood.

Christian Clemmensen, founder of Filmtracks.com and member of the IFMCA, praised the score, saying that "Powell has finally managed to create a well rounded and more easily digestible variation on his typical mannerisms for How to Train Your Dragon." He however criticized the use of Scottish and Irish tones in a score meant for Vikings, as well as the Jónsi song "Sticks & Stones", which he felt "[drained] all the enthusiasm out of the environment created by Powell." However, Clemmensen still awarded the score the highest rating of five stars, and later listed the score as one of the Top Five of the year.

Other reviewers expressed similar opinions about the score. Jonathan Broxton, founder of Movie Music UK and another member of the IFMCA said: "It's very rare that one can listen to an entire 70+ minute album and honestly say that all of them have musical merit, but that is genuinely the case here. Usually scores of this length have a fair amount of filler, […] but on How to Train Your Dragon every cue has worth." Archie Watt from MovieCues said: "I sincerely hope that Powell's work will be rewarded with an Oscar in 2011. It couldn't be more deserved—the score is by far the best of the year to date, and I can't foresee any other score taking that accolade from this masterpiece." Both reviewers named it as the Best Score of the Year.

British dressage rider Charlotte Dujardin prominently used music from the soundtrack for her Grand Prix Freestyle performances with her gelding Valegro. They also set the Freestyle World Record using the music at the Olympia London International Horse Show 2014.

== Awards and nominations ==
Awards
| Award | Category | Name | Outcome |
|---|---|---|---|
| Academy Awards | Academy Award for Best Original Score | John Powell | Nominated |
| Annie Awards | Annie Award for Best Music in an Animated Feature Production | John Powell | Won |
| British Academy Film Awards | BAFTA Award for Best Film Music | John Powell | Nominated |
| International Film Music Critics Association | Film Score of the Year | John Powell | Won |
| International Film Music Critics Association | Best Original Score for an Animated Feature | John Powell | Won |
| International Film Music Critics Association | Film Music Composition of the Year | John Powell - "Forbidden Friendship" | Nominated |
| International Film Music Critics Association | Film Music Composition of the Year | John Powell - "Test Drive" | Nominated |
| Saturn Awards | Saturn Award for Best Music | John Powell | Nominated |
| World Soundtrack Academy | World Soundtrack Award for Soundtrack Composer of the Year | John Powell | Nominated |
| World Soundtrack Academy | World Soundtrack Award for Best Original Song Written Directly for a Film | Jón Þór Birgisson | Nominated |

== Bibliography ==
- Powell, John (2020). How to train your dragon. Los Angeles, CA: Omni Music Publishing. ISBN 978-1-7345079-2-8.
