= Cathy Konrad =

American film and television producer (born 1963)

- Born: June 29, 1963 (age 63); Silver Spring, Maryland, U.S.
- Occupation: Film producer
- Spouse: James Mangold (m. 1999; div. 2014)
- Children: 2

Cathy Konrad (born June 29, 1963) is an American film and television producer.

== Career ==
Konrad has produced nineteen feature films, including critically acclaimed films such as Golden Globe-winner Walk the Line, 3:10 to Yuma, Girl, Interrupted, Kids and the Scream franchise. Since 2011, she has been working exclusively on TV. In 1999, she married film producer James Mangold; they have two sons. In 2014, the couple announced that they were divorcing. Konrad is credited as an executive producer for the former MTV and now, VH1 series Scream.

== Filmography ==
She was a producer in all films unless otherwise noted.

=== Film ===
Year	Film	Credit
1995	Kids	Co-producer
1995	Things to Do in Denver When You're Dead	Co-producer
1996	Citizen Ruth	
1996	Beautiful Girls	Executive producer
1996	Scream	
1997	Cop Land	
1997	Scream 2	
1998	Wide Awake	
1999	Teaching Mrs. Tingle	
1999	Girl, Interrupted	
2000	Scream 3	
2001	Lift	Executive producer
2001	Kate & Leopold	
2002	The Sweetest Thing	
2003	Identity	
2005	Walk the Line	
2007	3:10 to Yuma	
2010	Knight and Day	
2011	Scream 4	Executive producer
2022	Scream	Executive producer
2023	Scream VI	Executive producer
2026	Scream 7	Executive producer
TBA	Juliet	

Miscellaneous crew

Year	Film	Role
1988	Zelly and Me	Assistant production coordinator
1991	Other People's Money	Assistant: Ric Kidney
2011	Still Screaming: The Ultimate Scary Movie Retrospective	Herself

Thanks

Year	Film	Role	Notes
1997	Cop Land	Special thanks	Director's cut

=== Television ===
Year	Title	Credit
2006−08	Men in Trees	Executive producer
2012−13	Vegas	Executive producer
2015−17	Zoo	Executive producer Executive consultant
2015−19	Scream	Executive producer
2020	Wireless	Executive producer

Miscellaneous crew

Year	Title	Role
2017	Zoo	Executive consultant
