= Hallen für Neue Kunst =

Coordinates: 47.695°N 8.636°E

- Hallen für Neue Kunst
- Established: 1983
- Dissolved: 2014
- Location: Schaffhausen, Switzerland
- Type: Contemporary art museum
- Founder: Urs Raussmüller
- Owner: Raussmüller Collection & Projects (private non-profit)

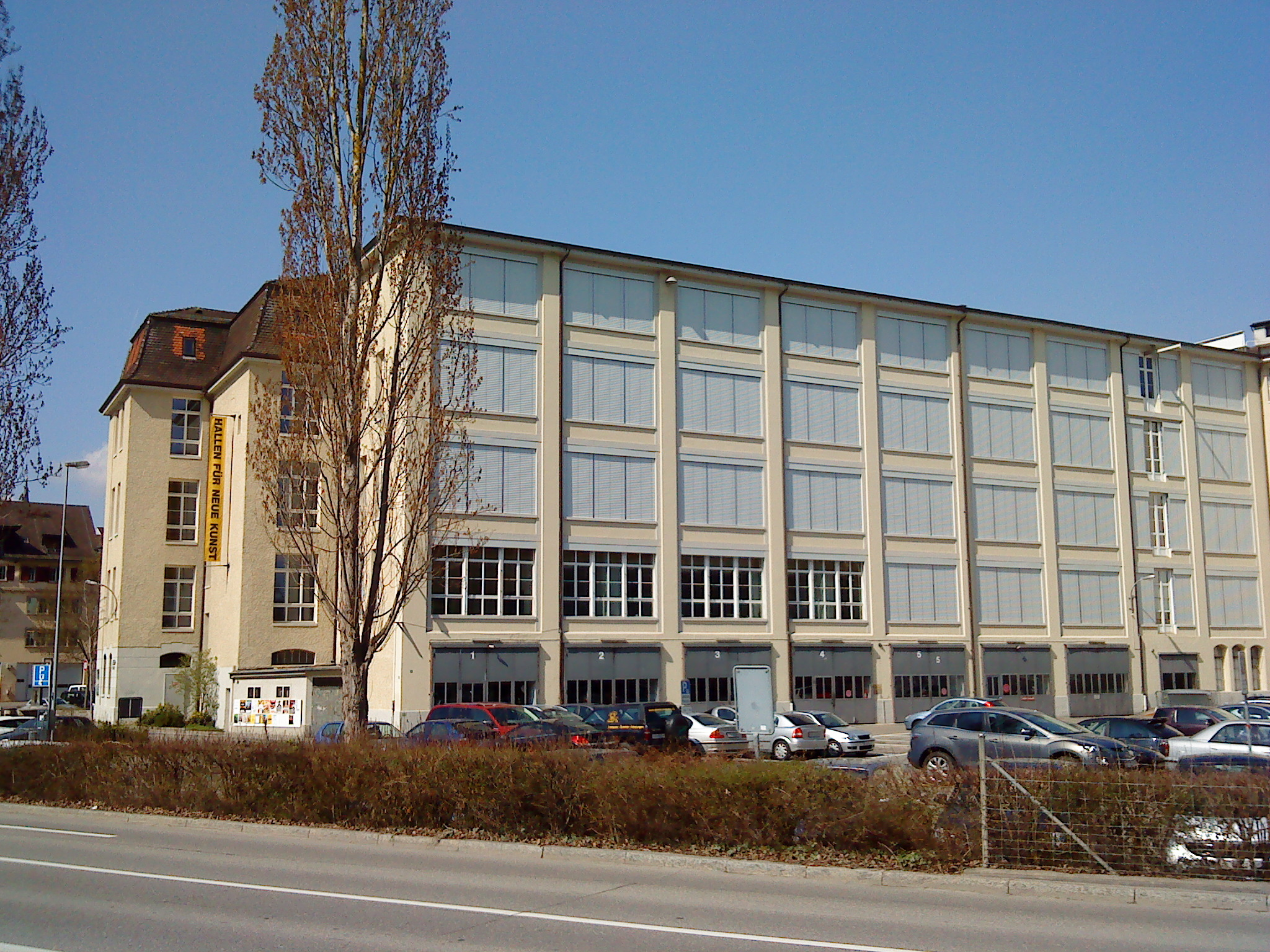
Hallen-für-neue-Kunst

The Hallen für Neue Kunst was a museum for contemporary art, especially 'New Art' since 1965. The institute was located in Schaffhausen, Switzerland, on the banks of the river Rhine. It was founded and established in 1982/83 by the artist Urs Raussmüller. Being convinced that New Art needed time and space to unfold its impact, he intended to create a permanent situation for major, predominantly large-scale works by American and European artists. As one of the first transformations of an industrial building into an art museum, the Hallen für Neue Kunst were considered to be a model for museums all over the world.

A total of 5,500 square meters in a former textile factory had been transformed into an exhibition for New Art, with Joseph Beuys' two-storied work "Das Kapital Raum 1970-1977" at its core. A large collection of architectural sculptures by Bruce Nauman were on display together with large groups of works of the pioneers of Minimal Art, Arte Povera, Land Art and Conceptual Art. Carl Andre's Cuts (1967) that was scarcely on display because of its enormous dimensions of (9.35 m x 13 m and a weight of app. 18 t) has found a place there. The Italian artist Mario Merz installed a capacious "villaggio" (village) with igloos, vines and neon lights. Sol LeWitt attributed numerous variations of cubes and wall drawings from the 1960s to the 1990s. Jannis Kounellis took the special situation of the building into account. Commenting on place and time, his works were closely connected with the surrounding space. The "Hallen" also showed a wide range of Robert Ryman's paintings as well as paintings by Robert Mangold.

The Hallen für Neue Kunst were a privately run institution. Responsible for the artworks and the cultural projects was Raussmüller Collection & Projects. Closed since January 2014, the Hallen für Neue Kunst was forced to close in 2014 following a protracted 10-year lawsuit that depleted its modest resources and will not be reopened again.

== Artists ==
Carl Andre, Joseph Beuys, Dan Flavin, Donald Judd, Jannis Kounellis, Sol LeWitt, Richard Long, Robert Mangold, Mario Merz, Bruce Nauman, Robert Ryman, Lawrence Weiner, ...

== See also ==
- List of museums in Switzerland
