= Anne Fortier =

Danish / Canadian writer

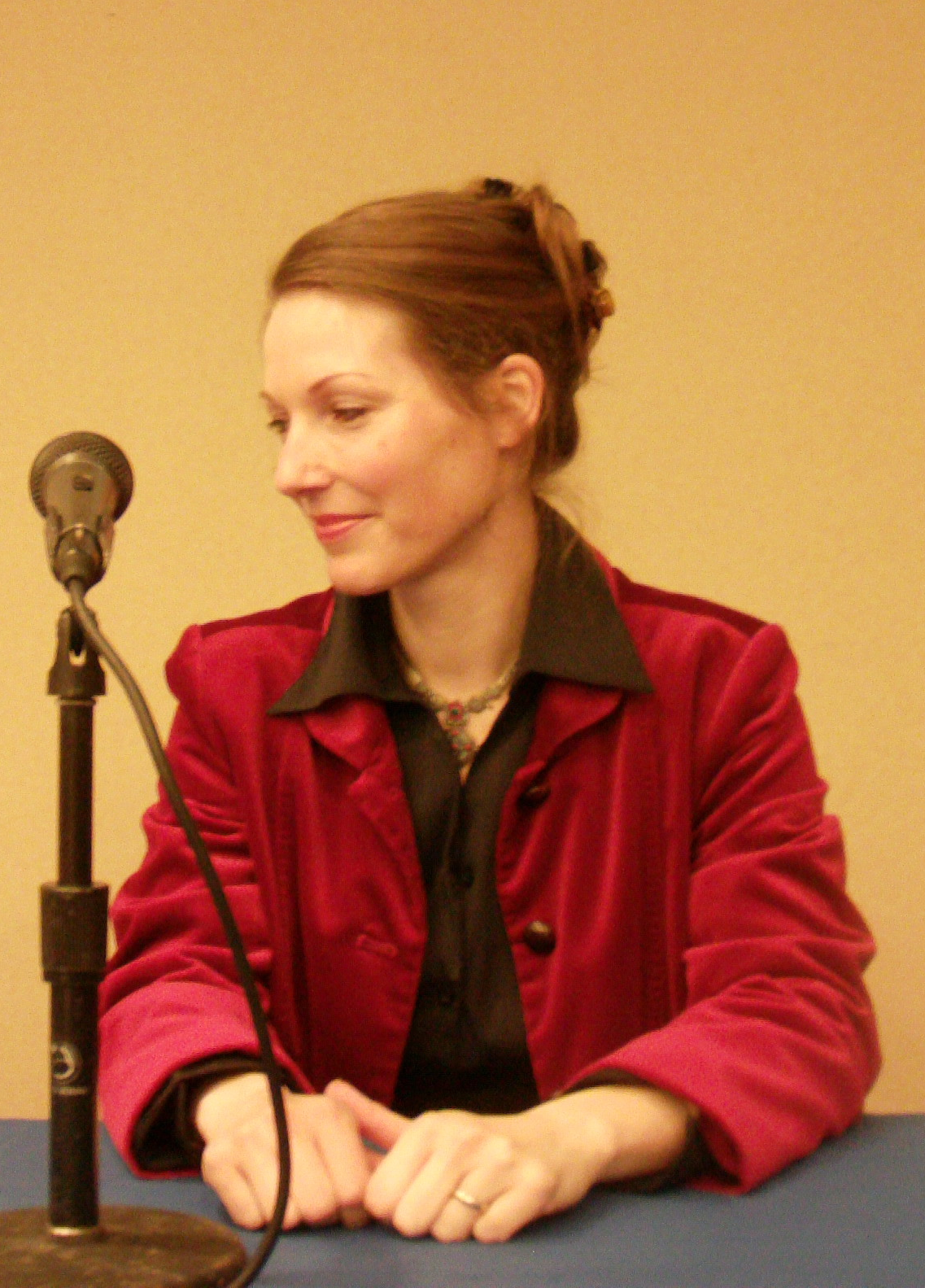
- Anne Fortier at a book convention in 2007
- Born: Holstebro, Denmark
- Education: Aarhus University (Ph.D.)
- Occupation: Writer
- Writing career
- Language: English, Danish
- Genre: Historical Fiction
- Website: www.annefortier.com

Anne Fortier (born 1971) is a Danish-Canadian writer who has lived in the US and Canada since 2002.

== Works ==
Fortier submitted her first manuscript for publication at the age of 13. Since then, she has written the novels Hyrder på bjerget (in Danish, 2005), Juliet (in English, 2010), Julie (co-written with Nina Bolt in Danish, 2013), Amazonerne's Ring (in Danish, 2013) and The Lost Sisterhood (in English, 2014).

The novel Juliet takes place in Siena (Sienna) in Italy and is based on the story of Romeo and Juliet. The novel was a New York Times Bestseller. A Juliet film is currently in production by Paramount/Montecito and director James Mangold.

Fortier also co-produced the Emmy Award–winning documentary Fire and Ice: The Winter War of Finland and Russia.

== Personal life ==
She was born in 1971 in Holstebro to mother Birgit Malling Eriksen.

Fortier holds a Ph.D. in the History of Ideas from Aarhus University, Denmark. During her studies she spent two terms at Corpus Christi College, Oxford as an Associate Graduate Member.
