= Sylvia Plimack Mangold =

American artist (born 1938)

Sylvia Mangold
- Born: Sylvia Plimack; 1938 (age 87–88); New York City, US
- Occupation: Painter
- Spouse: Robert Mangold
- Children: James Mangold; Andrew Mangold
- Parent(s): Ethel and Maurice Plimack

Sylvia Plimack Mangold (born 1938) is an American artist, painter, printmaker, and pastelist. She is known for her representational depictions of interiors and landscapes.

== Life and career ==
Sylvia Plimack was born in New York City to a family of Jewish background. She is the daughter of Ethel (Rein), an office administrator, and Maurice Plimack, an accountant and businessman. She grew up in Queens, and attended the High School of Music and Art in Manhattan, after high school she was accepted into the program at Cooper Union in 1956. She continued her studies at Yale University and graduated with a B.F.A. in 1961. In the same year she married Yale classmate and fellow painter Robert Mangold. She is the mother of film director/screenwriter James Mangold and musician Andrew Mangold.

Mangold's work was included in the 1971 exhibition Twenty Six Contemporary Women Artists held at The Aldrich Contemporary Art Museum and the 2022 exhibition 52 Artists: A Feminist Milestone also at the Aldrich.

In the 1980s she introduced the images of the landscape to the canvas affixed by the image of masking tape. Eventually, the landscape image filled the entire canvas and focused on individual trees, their branches cropped so as to create the spaces between the limbs and branches of the trees. All the landscape paintings are done from observation. Even as the subject matter of Plimack Mangold's paintings has shifted, her work has always been based in perceptual realism, inviting viewers to observe from up close and mirroring her own process of observation.

Mangold received a grant from the National Endowment for the Arts in 1975. Her work has been the subject of solo exhibitions at the Museum of Fine Arts, Boston, the Neuberger Museum of Art at the State University of New York at Purchase, and the Buffalo AKG Art Museum (formerly the Albright-Knox Art Gallery).

Mangold received the 2007 Cooper Union President's Citation Award and was inducted into The Cooper Union Hall of Fame in 2009.

== Selected collections ==
- Art Institute of Chicago
- Brooklyn Museum, New York
- Buffalo AKG Art Museum
- Indianapolis Museum of Art
- Kunstmuseum Winterthur, Switzerland
- Metropolitan Museum of Art, New York
- Modern Art Museum of Fort Worth, TX
- Museum of Fine Arts, Boston
- Museum of Fine Arts, Houston
- The Museum of Modern Art, New York
- Nelson-Atkins Museum, Kansas City, MO
- Smithsonian American Art Museum
- Walker Art Center, Minneapolis
- Wadsworth Atheneum, Hartford
- Whitney Museum of American Art, New York
- Yale University Art Gallery, New Haven

== Selected bibliography ==
- Inches and Field. Published by Lapp Princess Press Ltd., New York, 1978
- Sylvia Plimack Mangold Paintings 1965-1982. Published by Madison Art Center, Madison, Wisconsin, 1982
- Sylvia Plimack Mangold Paintings 1987-1989. Published by Brooke Alexander, New York, 1989
- Sylvia Plimack Mangold: Works on Paper 1968-1991. Co-published by Davison Art Center, Wesleyan University and University of Michigan Museum of Art, Ann Arbor, 1992 ISBN 978-0912303468
- The Paintings of Sylvia Plimack Mangold. Co-published by Albright-Knox Art Gallery, Buffalo and Hudson Hills Press, New York, 1994 ISBN 978-1555951030
- Natural Sympathies: Sylvia Plimack Mangold and Lovis Corinth Works on Paper. Published by Alexander and Bonin, New York, 2009
- Sylvia Plimack Mangold. Published by Alexander and Bonin, New York, 2012
- Sylvia Plimack Mangold: Landscape and Trees, ex. cat. West Palm Beach, Florida: Norton Museum of Art, 2012 ISBN 978-0943411507
- Sylvia Plimack Mangold: Floors and Rules, 1967–76. Published by Craig F. Starr Gallery, New York, 2016
- Molesworth, Helen (2024). Sylvia Plimack Mangold : Tapes, Fields, and Trees, 1975-84. New York, NY: Craig Starr Gallery. ISBN 9781734723953. OCLC 1473301439. Catalog of an exhibition held at Craig Starr Gallery, New York, New York, October 24, 2024-January 25, 2025; Review of the exhibition by John Yau
