= Cop Land =

1997 American crime drama film by James Mangold

- Theatrical release poster
- Directed by: James Mangold
- Written by: James Mangold
- Produced by: Cathy Konrad; Ezra Swerdlow; Cary Woods
- Starring: Sylvester Stallone; Harvey Keitel; Ray Liotta; Robert De Niro; Peter Berg; Janeane Garofalo; Robert Patrick; Michael Rapaport; Annabella Sciorra
- Cinematography: Eric Alan Edwards
- Edited by: Craig McKay
- Music by: Howard Shore
- Production company: Woods Entertainment
- Distributed by: Miramax Films
- Release date: August 15, 1997 (US)
- Running time: 105 minutes
- Country: United States
- Language: English
- Budget: $15 million
- Box office: $63.7 million

Cop Land is a 1997 American crime drama film written and directed by James Mangold. It stars Sylvester Stallone, Harvey Keitel, Ray Liotta and Robert De Niro, with Peter Berg, Janeane Garofalo, Robert Patrick, Michael Rapaport, Annabella Sciorra, Noah Emmerich and Cathy Moriarty in supporting roles. Stallone portrays the sheriff of a small New Jersey town who comes into conflict with the corrupt New York City police officers living in the community. The film received positive reviews and grossed $63.7 million on a $15 million budget.

== Plot ==
The small town of Garrison, New Jersey, is home to a cadre of corrupt police officers from the NYPD's 37th Precinct, including Lieutenant Ray Donlan, Detective Leo Crasky, and officers Gary Figgis, Jack Rucker, Frank Lagonda and Joey Randone. Exploiting a loophole to live outside of the city as "auxiliary transit cops", Donlan and his men are effectively untouchable by internal affairs, and are further protected by the local sheriff, Freddy Heflin. Having lost his hearing in one ear while rescuing a woman from the Hudson River as a young man, Heflin is unable to fulfill his lifelong dream of joining the NYPD.

Donlan's nephew, Officer Murray ”Superboy” Babitch, is sideswiped by two youths while driving across the George Washington Bridge; believing one of them has a weapon, a frightened Babitch fatally shoots them both. Donlan, Rucker and Crasky try to plant a gun in the teens' car but are caught by a paramedic, leading Donlan to fake Babitch's suicide before hiding him in Garrison. Heflin discovers that Randone is having an affair with Donlan's wife Rose, but he and his deputies Cindy and Bill turn a blind eye to Donlan and his men.

Heflin reconnects with Randone's wife Liz—the woman whom he saved from drowning—and they confess their feelings for each other. The cocaine-addicted Figgis is kicked out of Donlan's circle, and his house soon burns down with his girlfriend inside. Letting Figgis stay at his home, Heflin refuses to help internal affairs investigator Moe Tilden build his case against Donlan. Fearing that Babitch will expose them, Donlan and his men try to drown his nephew, who escapes and goes to Heflin for help, but flees when he sees Figgis. Unwilling to hunt down Babitch, Randone is thrown off a roof during a struggle with a violent suspect, and Donlan chooses not to save him.

Tired of being pushed around by Donlan and his men, Heflin goes to Tilden but learns that the mayor, under pressure from Donlan's allies in the police union, has shut down the investigation. Stealing Tilden's discarded files, Heflin realizes that Donlan's ties to organized crime allowed him to create a safe haven in Garrison while trafficking drugs through the 37th Precinct, and he had Figgis's partner killed before he could testify against him. Bill is reluctant to become involved, and Cindy leaves for her old department, having lost faith in Heflin's leadership. Rucker tries to intimidate Heflin at a carnival's pistol game, but he is surprised to find Heflin is a crack shot, as is Lagonda after Heflin is chided by Liz for digging into Donlan.

Heflin realizes that Figgis set fire to his own house, and Figgis admits that he committed insurance fraud to use the payout to leave Garrison for a new life. Convincing Rose to reveal where her nephew is hiding, Heflin takes Babitch into custody and sends Bill away for his own protection, but they are ambushed by Lagonda and Rucker, who capture Babitch and fire a gun next to Heflin's good ear. Completely deafened, Heflin follows them to Donlan's residence. In the ensuing shootout, he kills Lagonda and Rucker, but is wounded by Crasky. Figgis arrives, killing Crasky and distracting Donlan before he can shoot Heflin in the back, and Heflin fatally shoots Donlan.

Driving to NYPD headquarters, Heflin and Figgis deliver Babitch to Tilden. Figgis turns state's evidence, resulting in sweeping arrests and indictments across the police union, the mob and the 37th Precinct. Recovering the hearing in his good ear, Heflin continues to serve as sheriff in Garrison.

== Cast ==
- Sylvester Stallone as Sheriff Freddy Heflin
- Harvey Keitel as Lieutenant Ray Donlan
- Ray Liotta as Officer Gary "Figgsy" Figgis
- Robert De Niro as Lieutenant Moe Tilden
- Peter Berg as Officer Joey Randone
- Janeane Garofalo as Deputy Sheriff Cindy Betts
- Robert Patrick as Officer Jack Rucker
- Michael Rapaport as Officer Murray "Superboy" Babitch
- Annabella Sciorra as Liz Randone
- Noah Emmerich as Deputy Sheriff Bill Geisler
- Bruce Altman as Counselor Burt Kandel
- Cathy Moriarty as Rose Donlan
- John Spencer as Detective Leo Crasky
- Frank Vincent as PDA President Vince Lassaro
- Malik Yoba as Detective Carson
- Arthur J. Nascarella as Officer Frank Lagonda
- Victor Williams as Officer Russell Ames
- Edie Falco as Berta (Bomb Squad Agent)
- Mel Gorham as Monica Lopez
- Paul Herman as Carnival Worker
- Paul Calderón as Hector (GWB Paramedic)
- Vincent Laresca as Robert (GWB Paramedic)
- Method Man as Shondel (rooftop perp)
- Deborah Harry as Delores (4 Aces bartender)
- Frank Pellegrino as Mayor
- John Ventimiglia as Officer V
- Robert John Burke as Officer B
- John Doman as Lassaro’s aide
- Tony Sirico as mob boss Toy Torillo (uncredited)

== Production ==
=== Development ===
Garrison is based on Mangold's hometown of Washingtonville, New York, located about 60 miles (97 km) from New York City. Mangold grew up in a development called Worley Heights, where many of the residents were current and former NYPD police officers. Stallone gained 40 pounds (18 kg) to portray the beaten-down sheriff of Garrison.

=== Filming ===
The principal shooting location for the film was Edgewater, New Jersey.

== Music ==
Cop Land: Music from the Miramax Motion Picture

Soundtrack album by Howard Shore
- Released: 1997
- Genre: Soundtrack
- Length: 40:11
- Label: Milian

The film's soundtrack features two songs from Bruce Springsteen's 1980 album The River: "Drive All Night" and "Stolen Car", songs by other artists, and an original score by Howard Shore. One additional song, Blue Öyster Cult's "Burnin' for You", was added to the soundtrack of the director's cut, first released on home video in 2004.

The score by Howard Shore was performed by the London Philharmonic Orchestra and released as Cop Land: Music from the Miramax Motion Picture in 1997. The soundtrack released on CD contains twelve tracks, with a runtime of 40:11 minutes.

== Release ==
=== Theatrical ===
Cop Land premiered at the Ziegfeld Theatre in New York City on August 6, 1997. Some of the film's cast members attended, including Stallone, Keitel, Liotta, Sciorra, Moriarty and Rapaport.

Stallone's understated performance was praised by critics, and he received the Best Actor award at the Stockholm International Film Festival. Cop Land was also screened at the 54th Venice Film Festival in the midnight line-up. Earlier, in May 1997, the film was accepted into the main competition at the Cannes Film Festival, but Miramax declined the invitation due to re-shoots that were needed for the film, including footage of Stallone 40 pounds heavier.

=== Home media ===
Cop Land has been released on VHS, LaserDisc and DVD numerous times since 1998. The US LaserDisc released the theatrical cut in letterboxed (non-anamorphic) widescreen with special features consisting of an audio commentary with director James Mangold on the left analogue channel and chapter 16 of the LaserDisc containing deleted scenes. The initial extras-free DVDs contains the theatrical cut in non-anamorphic widescreen, while subsequent issues, including various "Collector's Editions" on DVD and Blu-ray, have favored the director's cut. StudioCanal's French and German region B-locked Blu-rays exclusively feature both the 101-minute theatrical cut and 116-minute director's cut.

Extras include an audio commentary (with James Mangold, Sylvester Stallone, Robert Patrick and producer Cathy Konrad), "The Making of an Urban Western" featurette, a storyboard comparison, two deleted scenes and the theatrical trailer.

The two deleted scenes primarily show the racism in the town of Garrison. One scene involves all the resident police officers chasing down a pair of Black motorists, and the other shows Heflin's deputy pointing out that the majority of the tickets issued in Garrison go to Black motorists on charges that suggest racial profiling.

== Reception ==
=== Box office ===
The film had a record opening weekend for Miramax with a gross of $13.5 million, and eventually grossed $44.9 million in the United States and Canada, and $63.7 million worldwide.

=== Critical response ===
On review aggregator Rotten Tomatoes, the film holds an approval rating of 75% based on 67 reviews, with an average rating of 6.5/10. The site's critics consensus reads: "Cop Land gifts its star-studded cast with richly imagined characters while throttling the audience with carefully-ratcheted suspense, although this potboiler lacks the moral complexity of the crime classics that it harkens to." On Metacritic, it has a weighted average score of 64 out of 100, based on 21 critics, indicating "generally favorable" reviews. Audiences polled by CinemaScore gave the film an average grade of "B−" on a scale of A+ to F.

Roger Ebert of the Chicago Sun-Times gave the film two stars out of four, and wrote, "There is a rough balance between how long a movie is, how deep it goes and how much it can achieve. That balance is not found in Cop Land and the result is too much movie for the running time."

On the other hand, Gene Siskel of the Chicago Tribune praised the movie, especially the screenplay, as "one to be savored".

Janet Maslin of The New York Times wrote that "the strength of Cop Land is in its hard-edged, novelistic portraits, which pile up furiously during the film's dynamic opening scenes ... Yet if the price of Mangold's casting ambitions is a story that can't, finally, match its marquee value, that value is still inordinately strong. Everywhere the camera turns in this tense and volatile drama, it finds enough interest for a truckload of conventional Hollywood fare. Whatever its limitations, Cop Land has talent to burn."

Entertainment Weekly gave the film a "B−" rating, with Owen Gleiberman writing, "Stallone does a solid, occasionally winning job of going through the motions of shedding his stardom, but the wattage of his personality is turned way down—at times, it's turned down to neutral. And that pretty much describes Cop Land, too. Dense, meandering, ambitious yet jarringly pulpy, this tale of big-city corruption in small-town America has competence without mood or power—a design but not a vision."

In her review for The Washington Post, Rita Kempley wrote, "With its redundancy of supporting characters, snarled subplots and poky pace, Cop Land really might have been better off trading the director for a traffic cop."

Rolling Stone magazine's Peter Travers praised Stallone's performance: "His performance builds slowly but achieves a stunning payoff when Freddy decides to clean up his town... Freddy awakes to his own potential, and it's exhilarating to watch the character and the actor revive in unison. Nearly down for the count in the movie ring, Stallone isn't just back in the fight. He's a winner."

In his review for the San Francisco Chronicle, Mick LaSalle liked Stallone's work: "His transformation is more than a matter of weight. He looks spiritually beaten and terribly sad. He looks like a real person, not a cult-of-the-body film star, and he uses the opportunity to deliver his best performance in years."

=== Legacy ===
With its dark tone and all-star dramatic cast, Cop Land was a shift from Stallone's recent comic efforts that were critical and box-office bombs (1991's Oscar and 1992's Stop! Or My Mom Will Shoot). Additionally, Cop Land was to show Stallone in a different light, both physically (his 40 pounds (18 kg) weight gain got a lot of press coverage), as well as artistically, by letting him showcase his acting skills.

The film posted solid box-office takings, received good reviews, and Stallone received positive critical notices for his performance. Yet Stallone has said that the film was bad for his career. In a 2019 interview, Stallone called Mangold "the best director I ever worked with [but the film] actually worked in reverse. It was pretty good critically, but the fact that it didn't do a lot of box office, again it fomented the opinion that I had my moment and was going the way of the dodo bird and the Tasmanian tiger."

James Mangold said that the hype due to the casting "overscaled the movie", and added: "I'm very proud of the movie and the ideas in it, but one of the things that was difficult for me at the time was that I'd imagined the lead being someone you hadn't heard of before, so that their extension into a hero would be less Hollywood."

== Television reboot ==
In April 2026, it was announced that a television series adaptation was in the works at Paramount Television Studios and Miramax Television. James Mangold will return to co-write, direct, and executive produce the series alongside Robert Levine, who will serve as showrunner. Two months later, Paramount+ acquired the rights to the series in a competitive bidding war.
