= Jim Kokoris =

American novelist

Jim Kokoris (born 1958) is an American novelist. He has written four books: The Rich Part of Life (2001), Sister North (2003), The Pursuit of Other Interests (2009), and It's. Nice. Outside. (2015).

The Rich Part of Life is the winner of the Friends of American Writers for Best First Novel of 2001 and has been optioned for film by Columbia Pictures. His novels are humorous yet poignant, and, like many authors, he sprinkles autobiographical references throughout his work. The Rich Part of Life takes place in a suburb of Chicago, for example, and Kokoris and his family reside in a suburb outside of Chicago. The Pursuit of Other Interests focuses on the mid-life crisis of an advertising executive and Kokoris works as a public relations executive.

Kokoris has also contributed humour articles to the Chicago Sun-Times, the Chicago Tribune, and Reader's Digest, among other publications.

== Novels ==
- The Rich Part of Life (2001)
- Sister North (2003)
- The Pursuit of Other Interests (2009)
- It's. Nice. Outside. (2015)
