= Juliet (novel) =

2010 novel by Anne Fortier

Juliet: A Novel
- Cover of Juliet
- Author: Anne Fortier
- Language: English
- Genre: Romance, historical fiction
- Publisher: Ballantine Books (Random House)
- Publication date: August 24, 2010
- Publication place: United States
- Media type: Print (Hardcover)
- Pages: 447 pp
- ISBN: 0345516109

Juliet is a 2010 novel by Danish American author Anne Fortier. It was first published in 2010 by Random House. Paramount Pictures owns the movie rights to the book.

== Plot ==
Juliet is about a woman named Julie Jacobs who discovers that her ancestor Giulietta is the real-life Juliet of Romeo and Juliet fame. In her encounters with various descendants of the young lovers' families, she realizes that the curse from the story—"A plague on both your houses!"—may be real and may be coming after her—unless she can find her Romeo. On the track to discover her real story she and her twin sister become closer and make the journey together, finding not only their real names, life and ancestors but love, true and real love.
