= James Mangold =

American filmmaker (born 1963)

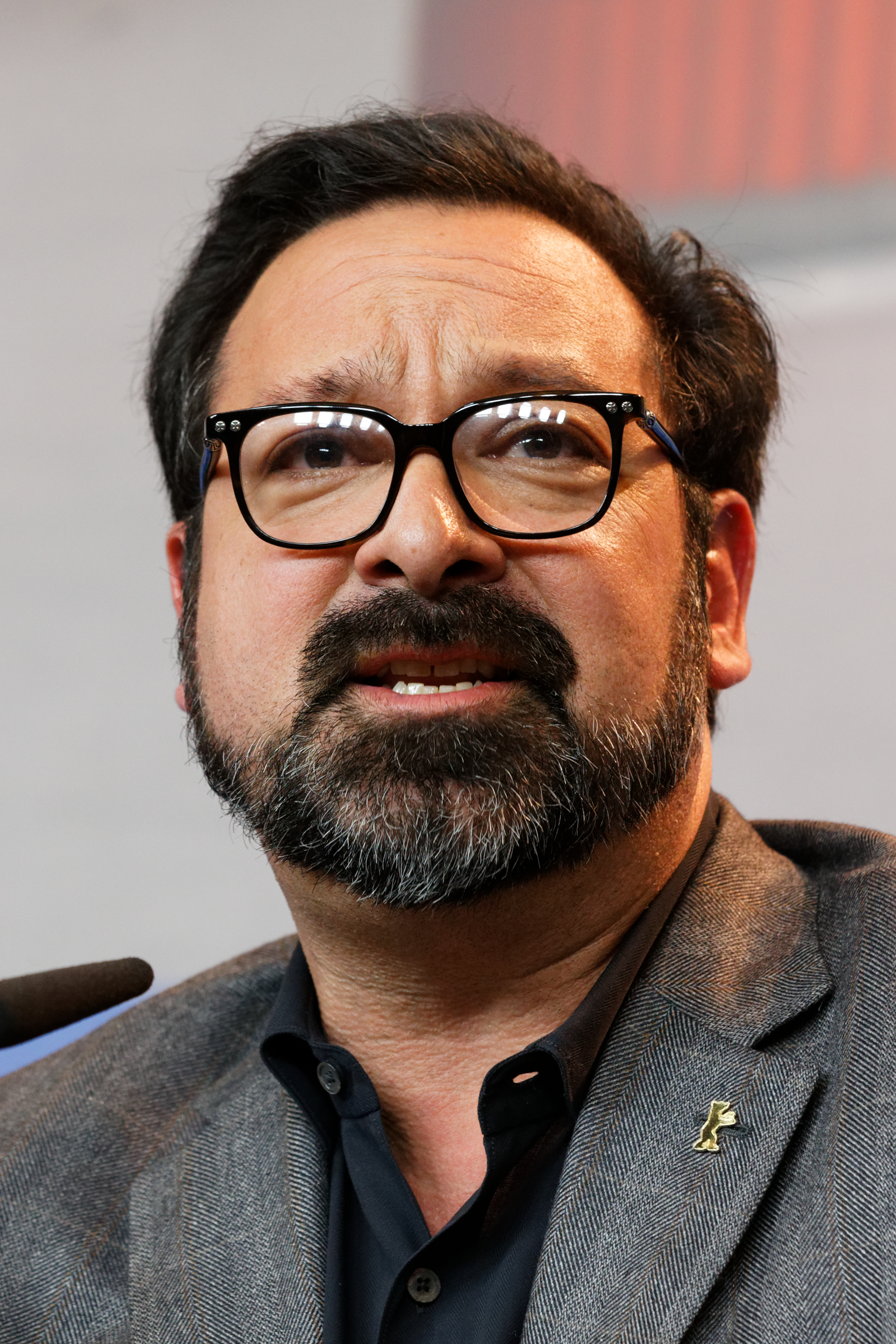
- Mangold in 2017
- Born: James Allen Mangold; December 16, 1963 (age 62); New York City, New York, U.S.
- Education: California Institute of the Arts (BFA); Columbia University (MFA)
- Occupations: Film director; screenwriter; producer
- Years active: 1985–present
- Spouse: Cathy Konrad (m. 1999; div. 2014)
- Children: 2
- Parents: Robert Mangold; Sylvia Plimack Mangold

James Allen Mangold (born December 16, 1963) is an American filmmaker. Noted for his versatility in tackling a range of genres, Mangold made his debut as a film director with Heavy (1995), and gained recognition for the films Cop Land (1997), Girl, Interrupted (1999), Identity (2003), Walk the Line (2005), 3:10 to Yuma (2007), Knight and Day (2010), and two films in the X-Men franchise with The Wolverine (2013) and Logan (2017), the latter of which earned him a nomination for the Academy Award for Best Adapted Screenplay.

He then directed the sports drama film Ford v Ferrari (2019), which earned him a nomination for the Academy Award for Best Picture, and directed and co-wrote Indiana Jones and the Dial of Destiny (2023), the fifth and final installment in the Indiana Jones series. For the Bob Dylan biopic A Complete Unknown (2024), Mangold was once again nominated for Academy Awards for Best Picture and Best Adapted Screenplay, in addition to his first nomination for Best Director.

== Early life ==
Mangold was born in New York City in 1963, and is the son of artists Robert Mangold and Sylvia Plimack Mangold. He was raised in Washingtonville, New York in the Hudson Valley and graduated from Washingtonville High School. His mother is Jewish, and he describes himself as "half-Jewish."

He attended the California Institute of the Arts film/video program where he studied under Alexander Mackendrick. During Mangold's third year, Mackendrick suggested that he should study at CalArts School of Theater as an actor, alongside his regular film studies. While at CalArts, he directed the promotional documentary Future View for Disney and General Motors.

== Career ==
=== 1985–2010 ===
In 1985, Mangold secured a writer/director deal at The Walt Disney Company. He wrote a television movie and co-wrote the animated feature Oliver & Company. A few years later, Mangold moved to New York and applied to Columbia University's film school, where he graduated with an MFA in film. While there, he studied under film director Miloš Forman who helped him develop the scripts for Heavy and Cop Land. He has worked as a feature writer and director since 1995, when his first feature, the independent film Heavy, won the best directing prize at the Sundance Film Festival.

Mangold subsequently wrote and directed Cop Land (1997), starring Sylvester Stallone, Robert De Niro, Harvey Keitel, and Ray Liotta; Girl, Interrupted, which won the Academy Award for Best Supporting Actress in 1999 for Angelina Jolie; Kate & Leopold, starring Meg Ryan and Hugh Jackman, for which Jackman was nominated for a Golden Globe as best actor in a musical or comedy in 2001, and the 2003 thriller Identity which starred John Cusack.

In 2005, Mangold co-wrote (with Gill Dennis), produced (under his production banner, Tree Line Film), and directed Walk the Line, a film about the young life of singer-songwriter Johnny Cash and his relationship with June Carter Cash. Starring Joaquin Phoenix and Reese Witherspoon, it was released on November 18, 2005, to positive reviews and grossed $187 million worldwide. It was nominated for five Oscars and Witherspoon won Best Actress for her performance as June Carter Cash. Mangold also appeared as an actor in The Sweetest Thing as a doctor and love interest to Christina Applegate as well as in his own Kate & Leopold playing a movie director.

In 2007, Mangold directed the Western 3:10 to Yuma, starring Russell Crowe and Christian Bale; it received positive reviews and grossed around $71 million worldwide.

In 2010, he directed the action comedy Knight and Day, starring Tom Cruise and Cameron Diaz; which received mixed reviews from critics and grossed $262 million worldwide.

=== 2013–present ===
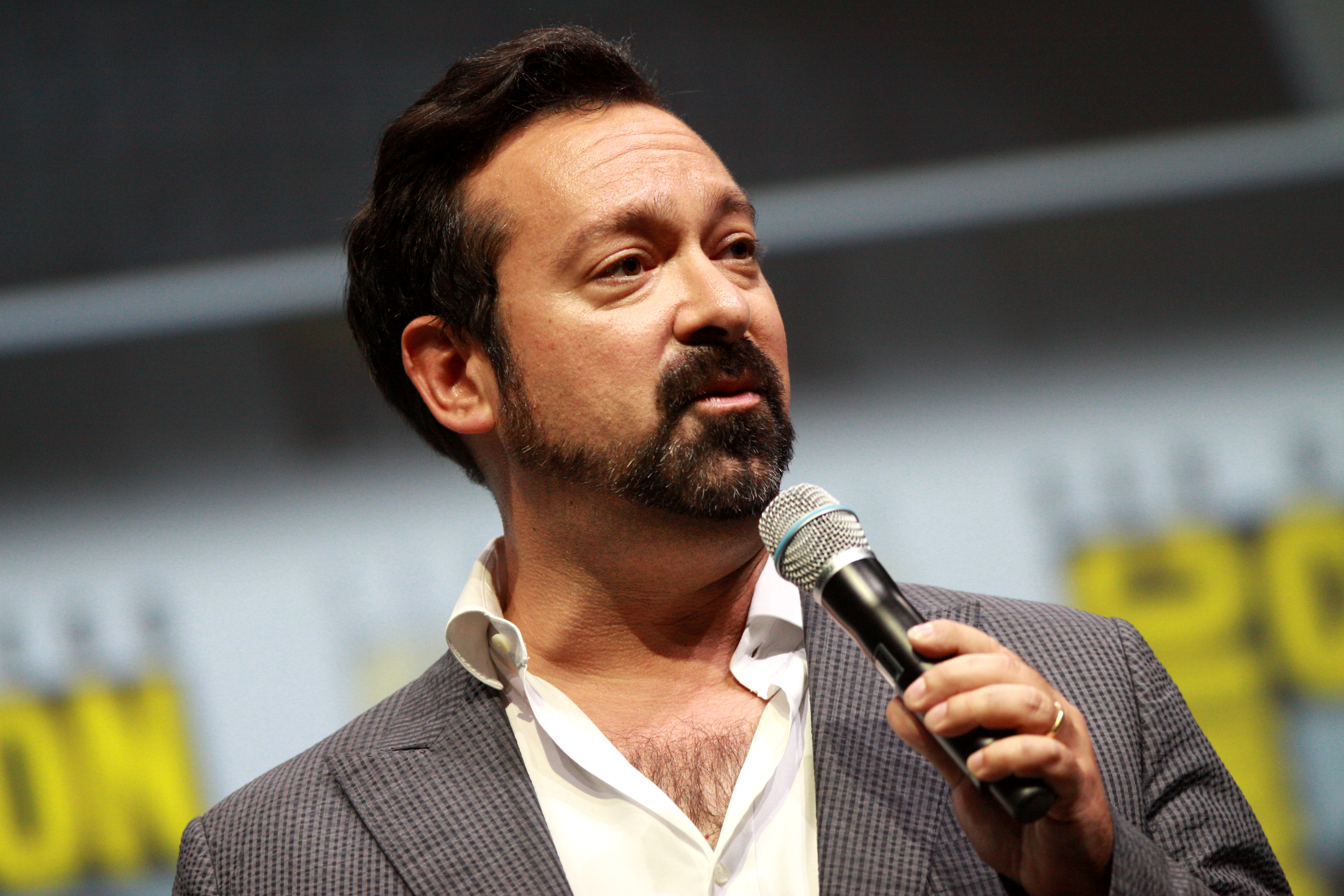
Mangold at San Diego Comic-Con to promote The Wolverine, 2013

In June 2011, Mangold was hired, initially just to direct the X-Men movie The Wolverine. Along with screenwriters Christopher McQuarrie, Scott Frank and Mark Bomback, Mangold also adapted the screenplay based upon Frank Miller and Chris Claremont's Japanese Wolverine saga and entered production in Japan and Australia in July 2012. He completed photography in November of the same year. On release, it was a box office success, ending up with a worldwide gross of $414,828,246 with a budget of $120 million, according to Box Office Mojo.

Following the box office success and moderate critical response to The Wolverine, Mangold signed on to write the story and direct the sequel, Logan (2017). The film marked Mangold and Jackman's third collaboration. Scott Frank was hired to return as co-screenwriter, working as a team with Mangold and Michael Green. The development of the film was lengthy, with Jackman citing his and Mangold's desire to do the character justice for his last time in the role. The film incorporated elements from Mark Millar's Old Man Logan run on the comics. Mangold has stated that the plot primarily focuses on character development, rather than superhero spectacle. Logan was a commercial success, and received high praise for its gritty approach on the titular character and emotional depth. Often called one of the greatest superhero films of all time, the movie also earned an Academy Award nomination for Best Adapted Screenplay, becoming the first live-action superhero movie to be nominated for Adapted Screenplay, as well as Mangold's first Oscar nomination.

In February 2018, it was announced that Mangold was set to direct a film about the 1966 24 Hours of Le Mans, with Christian Bale and Matt Damon starring as Ken Miles and Carroll Shelby respectively, and Jez Butterworth, John-Henry Butterworth and Jason Keller writing the script. The film, titled Ford v Ferrari, was released in November 2019 to critical acclaim and became a box office success, grossing $225 million worldwide. The film received 4 nominations including Best Picture, with two wins for Best Film Editing and Best Sound Editing at the 92nd Academy Awards.

In February 2020, it was announced that Mangold was in talks to direct the then untitled fifth film in the Indiana Jones franchise, later revealed to be titled Indiana Jones and the Dial of Destiny, taking over for Steven Spielberg, who directed the first four films in the franchise and instead served as one of the executive producers. In May 2020, it was officially confirmed that Mangold would serve as director. Filming began in the United Kingdom in June 2021, and wrapped in February 2022. The film was released on June 30, 2023.

In early 2020 Mangold was announced to direct the Bob Dylan biopic A Complete Unknown with Searchlight Pictures distributing, starring Timothée Chalamet. Despite production delays due to the COVID-19 pandemic and Mangold committing to Indiana Jones, Chalamet told Variety in November 2022 that he was still preparing for the role and that "the winds that are blowing are blowing in a very positive direction". In April 2023, Mangold confirmed that the film would likely begin production in August of that year, before plans were suspended in July due to the 2023 SAG-AFTRA strike. Filming eventually began in March 2024 and wrapped in time for a December release.

In February 2023, Mangold was reported by The Hollywood Reporter to be in early talks to write and direct a film based on the Swamp Thing, as part of James Gunn's and Peter Safran's newly announced "Chapter One: Gods and Monsters" film slate for the DC Universe (DCU), after the releases of his Indiana Jones film and Bob Dylan biopic. Two months later in April, Mangold confirmed that he had been hired to write and direct a Swamp Thing film, with Gunn soon confirming that he approached Mangold to do the film upon charting the DCU's storylines, describing the film as a passion project of Mangold's.

In April 2023, during Star Wars Celebration Europe 2023, Lucasfilm announced Mangold's involvement as director of a future Star Wars film whose story "will go back to the dawn of the Jedi" and explore the origins of The Force, set around 25,000 years before the events of the Star Wars prequel trilogy.

In August 2025, it was announced that Mangold would direct an adaptation of Jaime Oliveira's short story High Side.

In April 2026, it was announced that James Mangold would return to co-write, direct, and executive produce a television series adaptation of Cop Land alongside Robert Levine, who will serve as showrunner.

== Style ==
Mangold has said that he always seeks the emotional center of his stories and develops the project from there. He regards this as especially valuable when creating franchise films, as contemporary culture has made franchises a commodity to the point of being repetitious: "It makes an audience wish that they just had the first one over again. So you have to push something to someplace new, while also remembering the core reasons why everyone was gathered."

Despite contributing to the X-Men film series, he dislikes multiverses and multi-movie worldbuilding; he deems them the "enemy and death" of storytelling, as they encourage audiences to care more about Easter eggs and "the way the Legos connect," turning the emotional crux of a story into an intellectual exercise. Mangold has said that while creating a biographical film allows him to interpret known qualities as he sees fit, as he did in A Complete Unknown, the process is more difficult with notable IP franchises like the Swamp Thing, as the property's most avid fans often demand adherence to preexisting canon. However, he focuses on realizing his creative vision, even if his decisions bother fans; he refuses to be "handcuffed" by a franchise's lore and regards pleasing everybody as an impossible task.

Mangold's filmography spans many different genres. He has called this variety, and the process of determining what works for each of his films, "part of the joy" of filmmaking: by creating films in different genres, he is forced to adapt his filmic vernacular to fit the style needed. This allows him to carry lessons learned from one project over to another; for example, although Logan is a franchised superhero film, it draws on themes, visual motifs, and numerous references to the Western.

== Filmography ==
=== Film ===
Year	Title	Director	Writer	Producer	Notes
1995	Heavy	Yes	Yes	No	
1997	Cop Land	Yes	Yes	No	
1999	Girl, Interrupted	Yes	Yes	No	
2001	Kate & Leopold	Yes	Yes	No	
2003	Identity	Yes	Uncredited	No	Script revisions
2005	Walk the Line	Yes	Yes	No	
2007	3:10 to Yuma	Yes	No	No	
2010	Knight and Day	Yes	Uncredited	No	Script revisions
2013	The Wolverine	Yes	No	No	
2017	Logan	Yes	Yes	Executive	
2019	Ford v Ferrari	Yes	No	Yes	
2023	Indiana Jones and the Dial of Destiny	Yes	Yes	No	
2024	A Complete Unknown	Yes	Yes	Yes	Also soundtrack producer

Miscellaneous

Year	Title	Credit
1988	Oliver & Company	Co-writer
1995	Future View	Promotional documentary for The Walt Disney Company and General Motors
2001	Lift	Producer
2014	John Wick	Creative consultant
2017	The Greatest Showman	Executive producer
2020	The Call of the Wild	Producer
2024	Deadpool & Wolverine	Story consultant

=== Television ===
Year(s)	Title	Director	Executive producer	Writer	Episode
1986	The Disney Sunday Movie	No	No	Yes	"The Deacon Street Deer"
1992	Claymation Easter	No	No	Story	
2006	Men in Trees	Yes	Yes	No	"Pilot"
2012	NYC 22	Yes	No	No	"Pilot"
2012	Vegas	Yes	Yes	No	"Pilot"
2015–2017	Zoo	No	Yes	No	
2017–2018	Damnation	No	Yes	No	

Consulting producer

- City on a Hill (2019–2022)

== Recurring collaborators ==
Work Actor	1995	1997	1999	2001	2003	2005	2007	2010	2013	2017	2019	2023	2024	—N/a
Work Actor	Heavy	Cop Land	Girl, Interrupted	Kate & Leopold	Identity	Walk the Line	3:10 to Yuma	Knight and Day	The Wolverine	Logan	Ford v Ferrari	Indiana Jones and the Dial of Destiny	A Complete Unknown	Total
Deborah Harry														2
Pruitt Taylor Vince														2
Bruce Altman														2
Arthur J. Nascarella														2
Ray Liotta†														2
Robert Patrick														2
Clea DuVall														2
Viola Davis														2
Hugh Jackman														3
Dallas Roberts														2
Christian Bale														2
Patrick Stewart†														2
Boyd Holbrook														3
Corrado Invernizzi														2

== Accolades ==
Award	Year	Category	Work	Result	Ref.
Academy Awards	2018	Best Adapted Screenplay	Logan	Nominated	
Academy Awards	2020	Best Picture	Ford v Ferrari	Nominated	
Academy Awards	2025	Best Picture	A Complete Unknown	Nominated	
Academy Awards	2025	Best Director	A Complete Unknown	Nominated	
Academy Awards	2025	Best Adapted Screenplay	A Complete Unknown	Nominated	
British Academy Film Awards	2025	Best Film	A Complete Unknown	Nominated	
British Academy Film Awards	2025	Best Adapted Screenplay	A Complete Unknown	Nominated	
Directors Guild of America Awards	2025	Outstanding Directing in a Feature Film	A Complete Unknown	Nominated	
Grammy Awards	2026	Best Compilation Soundtrack for Visual Media	A Complete Unknown (soundtrack)	Nominated	
Producers Guild of America Awards	2020	Best Theatrical Motion Picture	Ford v Ferrari	Nominated	
Producers Guild of America Awards	2025	Best Theatrical Motion Picture	A Complete Unknown	Nominated	
Satellite Awards	2005	Best Director	Walk the Line	Nominated	
Satellite Awards	2005	Best Adapted Screenplay	Walk the Line	Nominated	
Satellite Awards	2019	Best Director	Ford v Ferrari	Won	
Saturn Awards	2018	Best Writing	Logan	Nominated	
Saturn Awards	2024	Best Director	Indiana Jones and the Dial of Destiny	Nominated	
Writers Guild of America Awards	2018	Best Adapted Screenplay	Logan	Nominated	
Writers Guild of America Awards	2025	Best Adapted Screenplay	A Complete Unknown	Nominated	

Directed Academy Award performances

Under Mangold's direction, these actors have received Academy Award wins and nominations for their performances in their respective roles.

Year	Performer	Film	Result
Academy Award for Best Actor
2005	Joaquin Phoenix	Walk the Line	Nominated
2024	Timothée Chalamet	A Complete Unknown	Nominated
Academy Award for Best Actress
2005	Reese Witherspoon	Walk the Line	Won
Academy Award for Best Supporting Actor
2024	Edward Norton	A Complete Unknown	Nominated
Academy Award for Best Supporting Actress
1999	Angelina Jolie	Girl, Interrupted	Won
2024	Monica Barbaro	A Complete Unknown	Nominated

== See also ==
- James Mangold's unrealized projects
