= Knight and Day =

2010 film by James Mangold

- Theatrical release poster
- Directed by: James Mangold
- Written by: Patrick O'Neill
- Produced by: Cathy Konrad; Todd Garner; Steve Pink
- Starring: Tom Cruise; Cameron Diaz; Peter Sarsgaard; Viola Davis; Jordi Mollà; Paul Dano
- Cinematography: Phedon Papamichael
- Edited by: Michael McCusker; Quincy Z. Gunderson
- Music by: John Powell
- Production companies: Regency Enterprises; Dune Entertainment; New Regency; Pink Machine; Todd Garner Productions; Tree Line Film
- Distributed by: 20th Century Fox
- Release dates: June 16, 2010 (Seville); June 23, 2010 (United States)
- Running time: 109 minutes
- Country: United States
- Language: English
- Budget: $117 million
- Box office: $262 million

Knight and Day is a 2010 American satirical action comedy film directed by James Mangold and starring Tom Cruise and Cameron Diaz. The film was the second on-screen collaboration of Cruise and Diaz after Vanilla Sky (2001). The film follows June Havens (Diaz), a classic car restorer, who unwittingly gets caught up with Roy Miller (Cruise), an eccentric secret agent, as Roy is on the run from the CIA.

The film's investors offset funding costs by paying Cruise a lower advance fee and providing him a share of revenue only after the financiers were repaid their investment in the production. Filming took place in several locations, mainly in several cities located in Massachusetts, while other scenes were filmed in Spain and parts of Austria and Jamaica.

Knight and Day was released in the United States by 20th Century Fox on June 23, 2010, and received mixed reviews from critics with praise for its action sequences and the performances of Cruise and Diaz, but criticized its script. The film grossed $262 million worldwide.

== Plot ==
June Havens, who is returning home to Boston from buying car parts in Wichita, collides with Roy Miller at the airport, and is bumped to a later flight. John Fitzgerald, a CIA agent, assumes June is working with Roy and puts her back on the plane.

On the plane, while June is in the restroom, Roy subdues the passengers and flight crew, who are agents sent by Fitzgerald, and crash-lands the plane in a cornfield. Drugging the shocked June, Roy warns that agents will come after her. Waking at home, she prepares for her sister April's wedding.

June learns April wants to sell their father's 1966 Pontiac GTO tri-power, which June had planned to restore as a wedding gift. She is picked up by Fitzgerald and his agents. Roy appears and rescues her, while also killing numerous agents in a highway chase.

June flees to her ex-boyfriend Rodney, a firefighter, before Roy arrives and pretends to take her hostage, shooting Rodney in the process. He convinces June she is safer with him and reveals that he has the Zephyr, a perpetual energy battery and that he had been assigned to guard its inventor Simon Feck, until Fitzgerald tried to steal the battery, framing Roy.

In Brooklyn, June and Roy discover Feck has gone into hiding, but left Roy a clue that he is in the Alps. They are attacked by henchmen sent by Antonio Quintana, a Spanish arms dealer. June gets drugged again and drifts in-and-out of consciousness as they are captured and then escape to Roy's off-the-grid island.

Accepting a call from her sister, June accidentally leads Quintana's men to the hideout. Escaping Quintana's unmanned aerial assault vehicle in a helicopter, Roy knocks June out to circumvent her fear of flying in the tiny helicopter.

June wakes up aboard a train in Austria, where Roy has reunited with Feck, and they manage to kill Bernhard, an assassin hired by Quintana. After checking into a hotel in Salzburg, June follows Roy to a meeting with Naomi, Quintana's henchwoman, where he offers to sell the Zephyr.

Fitzgerald and CIA Director Isabel George finds June and reveal Roy used her at the airport to smuggle the Zephyr past security. Heartbroken, June leads them to the hotel. Fleeing across the rooftops, Roy is shot and falls into the river with the Zephyr.

Feck is kidnapped from CIA custody by Fitzgerald, the real traitor, to be delivered to Quintana in Spain. Returning home, June attends her sister's wedding, and visits an address Roy had been monitoring, where she meets his parents and learns his real name is Matthew Knight.

His parents believe their son, an Army sergeant and Eagle Scout, was killed in action and have won various lotteries and sweepstakes they do not remember entering. Leaving a message on her own answering machine declaring she has the Zephyr, June is taken by Quintana's men to Seville.

Drugged with a prototype truth serum, June explains that Roy's deal with Quintana was meant to alert the CIA so June would be returned home safely in time for the wedding. Roy tracks Fitzgerald, rescues June and leads Quintana and his men on a car chase.

Quintana is killed by a bull stampede and Roy trades the Zephyr to Fitzgerald for Feck. Fitzgerald shoots at Feck anyway, but Roy takes the bullet. Right after Feck reveals that the battery is unstable it explodes, killing Fitzgerald.

Roy is hospitalized in Washington, D.C., where George tells him June has moved on and welcomes him back to the CIA. However, George's coded language reveals that he will be killed. June, disguised as a nurse, drugs Roy and breaks him out of the hospital. Waking up in the rebuilt GTO, Roy and June drive towards Cape Horn and his parents unexpectedly receive their own tickets there.

== Cast ==
- Tom Cruise as Roy Miller / Matthew Knight
- Cameron Diaz as June Havens
- Peter Sarsgaard as John Fitzgerald
- Jordi Mollà as Antonio Quintana
- Viola Davis as CIA Director Isabel George
- Paul Dano as Simon Feck
- Falk Hentschel as Bernhard
- Marc Blucas as Rodney
- Lennie Loftin as Braces
- Maggie Grace as April Havens
- Rich Manley as Danny
- Dale Dye as Frank Jenkins
- Celia Weston as Molly Knight
- Gal Gadot as Naomi
- Jack O'Connell as Wilmer

== Production ==
=== Development ===
Before film director James Mangold signed on to Knight and Day, it was previously associated with director Tom Dey. More than 12 writers contributed to the film. The Writers Guild of America, West, decided that due to this large number of contributors, only Patrick O'Neill, who had worked on the beginning layout of the script, would get credit. Other writers that worked on the film's script included Scott Frank, Laeta Kalogridis, Ted Griffin, Dana Fox, and Simon Kinberg.

=== Casting ===
The film changed lead cast members multiple times while the production was mired in "development hell". Prior to finalizing on actors Tom Cruise and Cameron Diaz, when the film was titled Wichita, comedian and actor Adam Sandler was offered a starring role in the film; he declined, saying, "I just don't see me with a gun." Wichita was developed under production at Revolution Studios; the film was later moved to Sony Pictures. At Sony Pictures, actors Chris Tucker and Eva Mendes were slated to portray the two lead roles in the film; it was titled Trouble Man and intended as a romantic vehicle film for the two actors.

After Tucker and Mendes dropped out of the lead roles, Diaz signed on to the film with Sony Pictures, and actor Gerard Butler met with production staff regarding starring opposite Diaz. Butler instead decided to take on the lead role in the film The Bounty Hunter, opposite actress Jennifer Aniston. Cruise, who at the time was auditioning for parts in five films, including Salt, and The Tourist, decided he wanted to star in Knight and Day, and he wanted to modify the role of the male lead character with his own ideas.

=== Financing ===
The film's production partners, New Regency and Dune Entertainment, offset financing for the film by paying Tom Cruise a lower advance fee than he normally received. Cruise previously normally received $20 million or higher in an advance fee, but he only received $11 million for Knight and Day. Cruise also agreed not to receive first-dollar gross, which was customary for him. That meant that Cruise would not receive a share of the film's revenue until Knight and Day funding investors had first gained back their investment in the production. In total, production costs for the film exceeded $125 million.

=== Filming ===
Principal photography began in mid-September 2009 in Boston and Bridgewater. Airport terminal scenes were filmed at Worcester Regional Airport. Filming also took place in Melrose, Danvers, and New Bedford, Massachusetts. Filming was also done in Spanish cities Seville and Cádiz, the Austrian city of Salzburg, and the Jamaican town of Port Antonio.

=== Music ===
The Black Eyed Peas recorded a theme song for the film, titled "Someday".

== Marketing ==
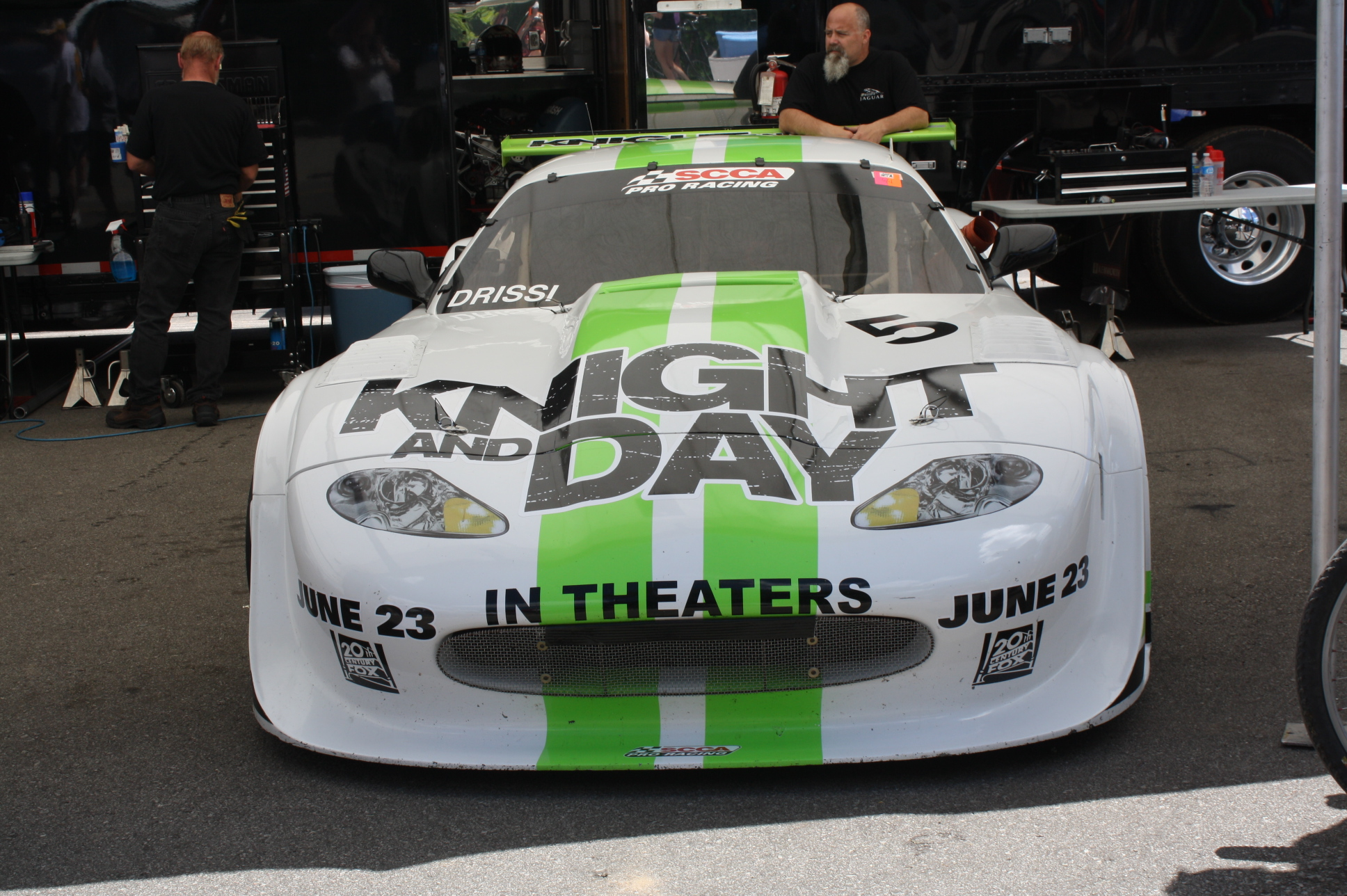
Knight and Day sponsored Trans-Am Series Jaguar XKR

Knight and Day had been set for a June 25, 2010, release date, but FOX moved its debut up two days to June 23; in the face of poor initial tracking numbers. The New York Observer analyzed the marketing for the film, which included an attempt at pushing a "viral video" of the two main stars; journalist Christopher Rosen commented on the desperation level of the publicity campaign, "the marketing for this thing has seemed more intrusive and desperate than any other big-ticket release in some time." Film producer Don Carmody commented negatively regarding the film's trailer, calling it "dull", and said the film would not do well because of the age of its two stars, "Cameron Diaz I think was a star, but she's no longer a star. Some of those stars are getting a little up there (in age)." The Hollywood Reporter noted that "potential viewers remain startlingly indifferent to whether they actually end up seeing it. And attention thus far is still drawn mostly by those under 25, which indicates that the fans who grew up with star Tom Cruise have moved on."

FOX attempted to increase word of mouth advertising for the film by showing a sneak preview on June 19, 2010; the Los Angeles Times reported the same day that pre-release surveys determined that the film was likely to become a commercial flop. Projections indicated that the film would only make $20 million at the box office; much less than the film production cost of $125 million. FOX production President Emma Watts said of the film's commercial prospects, "We aren't exactly where we hoped we would be." The Los Angeles Times noted that "... Cruise and Diaz are not as popular with younger moviegoers, who often drive big opening weekends in the summer. ... Among teenage and college-age males, the movie is barely registering, according to people who have seen the survey results." New York Magazine reported the film was "tracking miserably" before its first week. New York Magazine reported that "one of the film's biggest handicaps: its star, Tom Cruise". A FOX official commented to New York Magazine regarding the film's pre-release polling data, "at those numbers, we can't open the movie right now. Hopefully, they'll change in the next few days."

Upon hearing that tracking data on June 22, 2010, showed the film was not likely to produce revenue over $30 million in its first five days on screen, a FOX executive told TheWrap he was "confounded", and commented, "Tracking says one thing, but our sneak previews this weekend said something totally different. ... but if you look at the empirical data, we're nowhere." New York Magazine reported that the day before the film's release, a long scene from Knight and Day was made available on iTunes in an attempt to improve the lackluster 28–31% "definite interest" level of the movie. After results were reported from the film's initial debut, FOX distribution executive Bruce Snyder commented to The Hollywood Reporter, "It's an adult movie opening on a Wednesday, but we opened it there and snuck it on Saturday because we believe the word-of-mouth will be good, so we're set for a pretty good opening weekend. Remember, it's an original, adult movie, which we expect will run for quite a while."

== Alternative versions ==
An "extended cut", which adds eight minutes of footage mostly extending scenes and a new opening that better establishes June Haven's profession as a car restorer, was released on VOD in North America. As of January 2011 it had not been released in DVD region 1, though it had been released in regions 2, 3, and 4.

== Reception ==
=== Box office ===
Knight and Day grossed $76.4 million in the United States and Canada and $185.5 million in other territories for a worldwide total of $261.9 million. It underperformed at the box office in its debut, with a take of US$3.8 million the day after its initial June 23, 2010, release, from ticket sales in the United States and Canada. This was much less than the film Toy Story 3, which earned $13 million at the box office on the same day. Knight and Day did not place within the top 50 all-time Wednesday film openings. An analysis of the opening day results by Box Office Mojo noted it was the worst attended action film debut for Tom Cruise since his appearance in the 1986 Legend. It was the lowest-grossing opening day for Cruise in a leading role since his performance in the 1992 film Far and Away. Cruise's last starring role before Knight and Day, in the 2008 film Valkyrie, generated $8.5 million on its opening day. The previous film with Cameron Diaz and Cruise as the lead roles, Vanilla Sky, garnered $8.9 million on its opening day.

Moira Macdonald of The Seattle Times characterized the film's initial revenue results as "a box-office disappointment"; Roger Friedman noted for Hollywood News, "Bad reviews didn't help. 'K&D' has registered only 52% on Rotten Tomatoes. Even those reviews counted as positive weren't so good. They were stretching."; Nicole Sperling of Entertainment Weekly noted, "audiences just aren't showing up the way Fox might have hoped"; and Ben Fritz of Los Angeles Times called the film's debut a "soft" opening, and commented, "It wasn't a good first day or night at the box office for 'Knight and Day.'"

The film's revenues dropped nine percent on its second day of release, earning $3.5 million in ticket sales. During the same period that revenues dropped for Knight and Day, ticket sales for Toy Story only fell by three percent, The Karate Kid dropped by six percent; while other films increased revenues at the same time, including, Shrek Forever After, Sex and the City 2, Get Him to the Greek, Killers, and Robin Hood. In its first weekend, Knight and Day was paired up against Grown Ups, a comedy film starring Adam Sandler, Kevin James, Chris Rock, David Spade and Rob Schneider. The Friday of its first weekend after release, Knight and Day took third place at the box office, behind both Grown Ups and Toy Story 3. The film brought in a total of $6.4 million on its third day of release.

=== Critical response ===
On Rotten Tomatoes, the film has an approval rating of 51% based on 230 reviews and an average rating of 5.60/10. The site's critical consensus reads, "It's pure formula, but thanks to its breezy pace and a pair of charming performances from Tom Cruise and Cameron Diaz, Knight and Day offers some agreeably middle-of-the-road summer action." On Metacritic, the film has a score of 46 out of 100 based on 38 critics, indicating "mixed or average" reviews. Audiences polled by CinemaScore gave the film an average grade of "B+" on an A+ to F scale.

Justin Chang of Variety characterized the film as "a high-energy, low-impact caper-comedy that labors to bring a measure of wit, romance and glamour to an overworked spy-thriller template". Kirk Honeycutt of The Hollywood Reporter wrote: "Bottom Line: Logic and plausibility take a holiday in this nonstop actioner that counts on stars Tom Cruise and Cameron Diaz to sell the nonsense." Honeycutt criticized the writing, "the script is too lazy to develop any of its characters – and that includes the leads", and commented, "laziness permeates the film from the inexplicable escapes to the neglected romance". Michael Phillips of the Chicago Tribune criticized the script, the direction, cinematography, set pieces, and action sequences. Phillips concluded, calling it "A 21st Century Charade pumped up on all the wrong steroids, 'Knight and Day' may well suffice for audiences desperate for the bankable paradox known as the predictable surprise, and willing to overlook a galumphing mediocrity in order to concentrate on matters of dentistry."

Emanuel Levy was critical of the film's writing, calling it a "mindless flick"; he noted, "The story moves at a breakneck speed, as if to conceal the incongruities in the storytelling." Levy gave the film a grade of "C", and commented, "Preposterously plotted, the saga is dominated by long, energetic, uneven action sequences, but it lacks any logic and pays minimal attention to characterization. Repetitious in structure, and with humor that more often than not misses the mark, 'Knight and Day' is characterized by nihilistic violence and amoral tone, which wouldn't have mattered had the movie been witty or fun to watch." Simon Abrams of Slant Magazine gave the film a rating of two stars out of four, and commented of the film's director and writer, "Clearly O'Neill and Mangold are trying to give viewers what producers would undoubtedly like to sell as 'something for everybody,' but there's no consistency to the thing and no chemistry whatsoever between Cruise and Diaz, making the alternating tug-of-war between girly and manly elements of the film seem extraordinarily forced." Rene Rodriguez of The Miami Herald wrote that there was "no chemistry between Cruise and Diaz", and commented regarding Cruise's acting, "Tom Cruise spends much of 'Knight and Day' looking as if he's waiting for someone to pour casting mold over his head to make an action figure." Peter Howell in the Toronto Star commented, "There is supposed to be romance in Knight and Day — and Diaz is up for it — but Cruise still looks as if he's taken charisma lessons from Al Gore."

Entertainment Weekly's Lisa Schwarzbaum gave Knight and Day a grade of "C+", and compared it to the 2010 film Killers starring Katherine Heigl and Ashton Kutcher, "The producers assume that audience interest in movie stars is bigger than audience interest in characters. The conclusion is overdetermined, since Roy and June are such flimsy constructions. ... At least they're not Katherine Heigl and Ashton Kutcher in Killers." Colin Covert of Star Tribune made a similar comparison, "The film looks unambitious, like a remake of 'Killers,' the Ashton Kutcher-Katherine Heigl guns-and-giggles toss-off everyone has already forgotten, but with bigger stunts and more star wattage." In a review for The Huffington Post, critic Marshall Fine observed, "the movie bubbles happily for almost an hour before it flags". Robert Bell of Exclaim! wrote of the script, "Sure, things slow down a bit around the midway point, making it clear that there is very little going on here aside from cheesy escapist fantasy, but things quickly pick up again, engaging us in the moment of a movie that knows exactly what mainstream trash cinema should be." In a review for the Orlando Sentinel, critic Roger Moore commented, "The blase plot devices (a gadget, the nerdy guy who invented it), the bland villains, the too-fast dash through exotic locales, don't matter so long as Cruise and Diaz click and spark their scenes – chases and embraces – to life. And Cruise, hurling himself at this as if his Mission: Impossible future and indeed his whole career depended on it, makes sure they do."

The Wall Street Journal critic Joe Morgenstern commented, "'Knight and Day' woke me up to just how awful some summer entertainments have become. It isn't that the film is harmful, except to moviegoers' wallets and movie lovers' morale, but that it is truly phenomenal for the purity of its incoherence." Writing for the Chicago Sun-Times, Roger Ebert rated the movie 3 stars out of 4 and wrote, "'Knight and Day' aspires to the light charm of a romantic action comedy like 'Charade' or 'Romancing the Stone,' but would come closer if it dialed down the relentless action. The romance part goes without saying after a Meet Cute contrived in an airport, and the comedy seems to generate naturally between Tom Cruise and Cameron Diaz. But why do so many summer movies find it obligatory to inflict us with CGI overkill? I'd sorta rather see Diaz and Cruise in action scenes on a human scale, rather than have it rubbed in that for long stretches, they're essentially replaced by animation." Ty Burr of The Boston Globe stated, "The movie's a piece of high-octane summer piffle: stylish, funny, brainless without being too obnoxious about it, and Cruise is its manic animating principle." Writing for the Associated Press, Christy Lemire commented, "Cruise's presence also helps keep things light, breezy and watchable when the action – and the story itself – spin ridiculously out of control." Bill Goodykoontz of The Arizona Republic observed, "Mangold, working from a script by Patrick O'Neill, accelerates events in a way that is either a perfect representation of how current action films are made or a demonstration of everything that's wrong with movies today. Maybe it's both." CNN's Tom Charity commented, "there's a creeping anxiety about this project, a tendency to over-compensate that speaks to underlying inadequacies."

== See also ==
- Bang Bang!, 2014 Bollywood film and remake of Knight and Day
