= 23rd Hollywood Film Awards =

US film awards ceremony in 2019

- Date: November 3, 2019
- Site: The Beverly Hilton; Beverly Hills, California, U.S.
- Hosted by: Rob Riggle
- Official website: www.hollywoodawards.com

The 23rd Hollywood Film Awards were held on November 3, 2019. The ceremony took place at The Beverly Hilton in Beverly Hills, California, and was hosted by Rob Riggle.

== Winners ==
Hollywood Career Achievement Award
Charlize Theron
Hollywood Actor Award
Antonio Banderas – Pain and Glory
Hollywood Actress Award
Renée Zellweger – Judy
Hollywood Supporting Actor Award
Al Pacino – The Irishman
Hollywood Supporting Actress Award
Laura Dern – Marriage Story
Hollywood Breakout Actor Award
Taron Egerton – Rocketman
Hollywood Breakout Actress Award
Cynthia Erivo – Harriet
Hollywood Filmmaker Award
Bong Joon-ho – Parasite
Hollywood Director Award
James Mangold – Ford v Ferrari
Hollywood Producer Award
Emma Tillinger Koskoff – The Irishman
Hollywood Screenwriter Award
Anthony McCarten – The Two Popes
Hollywood Breakthrough Director Award
Olivia Wilde – Booksmart
Hollywood Breakthrough Screenwriter Award
Shia LaBeouf – Honey Boy
Hollywood Animation Award
Toy Story 4
Hollywood Blockbuster Award
Kevin Feige and Victoria Alonso – Avengers: Endgame
Hollywood Cinematography Award
Mihai Mălaimare Jr. – Jojo Rabbit
Hollywood Costume Design Award
Anna Mary Scott Robbins – Downton Abbey
Hollywood Editor Award
Michael McCusker and Andrew Buckland – Ford v Ferrari
Hollywood Film Composer Award
Randy Newman – Marriage Story
Hollywood Make-Up & Hair Styling Award
Lizzie Yianni-Georgiou, Tapio Salmi, and Barrie Gower – Rocketman
Hollywood Production Design Award
Ra Vincent – Jojo Rabbit
Hollywood Song Award
Pharrell Williams – "Letter to My Godfather" from The Black Godfather
Hollywood Sound Award
Donald Sylvester, Paul Massey, David Giammarco, and Steven A. Morrow – Ford v Ferrari
Hollywood Visual Effects Award
Pablo Helman – The Irishman
