= Get On Up (film) =

2014 film by Tate Taylor

- Theatrical release poster
- Directed by: Tate Taylor
- Screenplay by: Jez Butterworth; John-Henry Butterworth
- Story by: Steven Baigelman; Jez Butterworth; John-Henry Butterworth
- Produced by: Brian Grazer; Mick Jagger; Tate Taylor; Victoria Pearman
- Starring: Chadwick Boseman; Nelsan Ellis; Dan Aykroyd; Viola Davis; Craig Robinson; Octavia Spencer
- Cinematography: Stephen Goldblatt
- Edited by: Michael McCusker
- Music by: Thomas Newman
- Production companies: Imagine Entertainment; Jagged Films; Wyolah Films
- Distributed by: Universal Pictures
- Release date: August 1, 2014
- Running time: 139 minutes
- Country: United States
- Language: English
- Budget: $30 million
- Box office: $33.4 million

Get On Up is a 2014 American biographical musical film directed by Tate Taylor and written by Jez and John-Henry Butterworth. Produced by Brian Grazer, Mick Jagger, and Taylor and Victoria Pearman, the film stars an ensemble cast featuring Chadwick Boseman as singer James Brown, Nelsan Ellis as Bobby Byrd, Dan Aykroyd as Ben Bart, Viola Davis as Susie Brown, Craig Robinson as Maceo Parker, and Octavia Spencer as Aunt Honey. Using a nonlinear narrative, it follows James's stream of consciousness as he recalls events from his life in an asynchronous manner, occasionally breaking the fourth wall to address the audience. This is the third collaboration between Aunjanue Ellis and Nelsan Ellis after The Express: The Ernie Davis Story and The Help (also directed by Taylor).

The project was announced August 2013, along with Boseman, Davis, Spencer and Ellis' casting. Principal photography began that November and took place in Mississippi, where the entire film was shot on location in 49 days.

Get On Up was released on August 1, 2014, in the United States and received generally positive reviews from critics, with praise directed at the performances of the cast (particularly those of Boseman and Ellis), and grossed $33 million worldwide at the box office.

== Plot ==
In 1939, young James Brown lives in squalor with his mother Susie and abusive father Joe in the backwoods of Augusta, Georgia. Susie eventually abandons the family and becomes a prostitute, while Joe enlists in the Army; James' brothel-running aunt Honey becomes his legal guardian and introduces him to the shout music at a black church, fascinating him. Later, while fighting in a "battle royal" boxing match in front of a white audience, he emerges victorious after imagining the jazz band breaking into a funk style. He spots his mother on the street one night, but she denies knowing him.

James is imprisoned for stealing a suit at the age of 16 in 1949. When Bobby Byrd and his gospel group perform at the prison, an inspired James impresses Bobby with his singing, and Bobby's family proceeds to supervise his parole. James establishes himself as a lead singer and shifts the group's sound toward R&B. He leads them to crash a Little Richard show, introduces them as "the Famous Flames", and leads them in a rousing rendition of "Caldonia". Richard advises him to beware the "white devil". James marries Velma Warren, and they have a son, Teddy. In 1955, Ralph Bass signs the band to King Records and releases their first single, "Please, Please, Please". Ben Bart, the president of New York City's Universal Attractions Agency, becomes James' manager; he and label executive Syd Nathan relegate the rest of the band to salaried employee status, and they quit.

By 1962, James and Bobby have re-formed the band, and James finances the recording of the hugely successful Live at the Apollo. After the show, Susie approaches him and apologizes for abandoning him; he consents to financially support her. In 1964, James upstages the up-and-coming Rolling Stones on the T.A.M.I. Show with his high-energy performance and dance moves. By paying young radio DJs to promote his shows, he successfully avoids promoter fees. He divorces Velma and marries Deidre Jenkins, but becomes abusive toward her. Despite mistreating his new backing band members, fining them for various infractions, calling rehearsals on their days off, and berating them for questioning him, he develops a signature groove that becomes the foundation for funk.

Upon the commencement of the weeklong King-assassination riots in April 1968, James cautions Boston mayor Kevin White against cancelling his show at the Boston Garden. Confronted with rising tensions between the police and the black audience, he calmly pleas for togetherness. He records "Say It Loud – I'm Black and I'm Proud" with a children's choir and implores President Lyndon B. Johnson to approve a series of USO shows for American troops stationed in Vietnam. Though their plane is nearly shot down en route, the band survives and their subsequent performances that June are well-received.

Over time, several setbacks occur for James; Ben perishes from a sudden heart attack that August, and several businesses that James has established are investigated by the IRS for back taxes. When James rejects a list of demands from his band members, all of them quit except for Bobby, who assists him in assembling a new ensemble. After a 1971 concert in Paris, Bobby proposes doing a second solo album, which James considers a betrayal; Bobby parts ways with him following an argument.

While drugged on marijuana and PCP in 1988, James visits one of his businesses in an Augusta strip mall he owns, finding that someone from a neighboring seminar has used his private restroom without his consent. He confronts the seminar carrying a shotgun, which he accidentally fires into the ceiling before forgiving the offender and escaping in his truck. After crashing through a roadblock, he is apprehended and imprisoned by the police.

In 1993, James encounters Bobby for the first time in 20 years and invites him to his upcoming concert at Atlanta's Omni Coliseum. Walking through a darkened hall, he reflects on how much he has sacrificed for success and imagines people from throughout his life chanting his name. Seeing Bobby and his wife Vicki Anderson in the audience, he performs "Try Me" onstage, moving them to tears, and the audience erupts into cheers.

== Cast ==
- Chadwick Boseman as James Brown
  - Jamarion and Jordan Scott as young James Brown
- Nelsan Ellis as Bobby Byrd
- Dan Aykroyd as Ben Bart
- Viola Davis as Susie Brown
- Lennie James as Joseph "Joe" Brown
- Fred Melamed as Syd Nathan
- Jamal Batiste as John "Jabo" Starks
- Craig Robinson as Maceo Parker
- Jill Scott as Deidre "Dee-Dee" Jenkins
- Octavia Spencer as Aunt Honey Washington
- Josh Hopkins as Ralph Bass
- Brandon Mychal Smith as Little Richard
- Tika Sumpter as Yvonne Fair
- Aunjanue Ellis as Vicki Anderson
- Tariq Trotter as Pee Wee Ellis
- Aloe Blacc as Nafloyd Scott
- Keith Robinson as Baby Roy
- Nick Eversman as Mick Jagger
- Liz Mikel as Gertrude Sanders
- Aaron Jay Rome as Frankie Avalon
- Clyde Jones as Daddy Grace
- Joe T. Blankenship as Alan Leeds
- Aakomon Jones as Bobby Bennett
- John Benjamin Hickey as Richard
- Allison Janney as Kathy
- Jamell Richardson as Jimmy Nolen
- Justin Hall as Bootsy Collins
- David Carzell as Catfish Collins
- Jason Davis as Mayor Kevin White
- Charles R. Rooney as President Lyndon B. Johnson
- Ralph Tresvant as Sam Cooke

== Production ==
=== Development ===
Imagine Entertainment listed a James Brown biopic in development in 2000, with a script titled Star Time written by Steven Baigelman. Mick Jagger joined on as a producer, and Jez and John-Henry Butterworth were brought on to rewrite the script, titled Superbad. Spike Lee was set to direct but development stalled in 2006 over music licensing and finance issues. It was revived in 2012 when Jagger read a recent draft by the Butterworth brothers. John-Henry Butterworth was fascinated by the period concept of celebrity in preparing to write. “When James was becoming famous, you had to hide where you came from and be squeaky clean. Whereas if he were an artist launching his career now his upbringing and what happened to him would be right there in the press release. Everyone knows how many times 50 Cent has been shot.” The script took some liberties and includes at least one scene involving fabricated incidents. Lee vacated the director's position, and on October 22, 2012, it was announced that Tate Taylor was set to direct the untitled biopic about James Brown, to be produced by Mick Jagger and Imagine Entertainment's Brian Grazer. On August 29, 2013, Universal Pictures set October 17, 2014, as a release date for the film, previously untitled. Later, on November 13, Universal shifted the release date of the biopic from October to August 1, 2014.

=== Casting ===
On August 26, 2013, Universal selected Chadwick Boseman to play the lead role of James Brown. Boseman did all of his own dancing and some singing. The soundtrack is live recordings of James Brown. On September 17, Universal announced an open casting call for actors, musicians, and extras for different roles in the biopic, which was held on September 21. On September 30, Taylor cast Viola Davis to play Susie Brown and Octavia Spencer to play Aunt Honey. On October 21, Nelsan Ellis joined the cast of film to portray Bobby Byrd, Brown's long-time friend. Lennie James joined the cast on October 23, to play the role of Brown's father Joseph "Joe" James. Jill Scott and Dan Aykroyd were added on October 31; Scott played Brown's wife while Aykroyd played Ben Bart, the president of one of New York City's largest talent agencies Universal Attractions Agency.

On November 3, Universal added Keith Robinson to the film to portray the role of Baby Roy, a member of Brown's band. On November 14, Tika Sumpter also joined the cast, to play singer Yvonne Fair. There was a rumor that Taraji P. Henson was to join the film to play Tammi Terrell. Nick Eversman joined the cast on November 19, to play Mick Jagger. On December 9, 2013, it became public that Brandon Mychal Smith was selected to portray Brown's musical idol, Little Richard. On December 20, Josh Hopkins joined the film to portray the role Ralph Bass, a music producer. After the shooting wrapped up in Natchez, Mississippi, the production was looking for extras to begin a shoot on January 6, 2014, filming a concert scene set in Paris in 1971. There was another call on January 6, 2014, for extras to film some daytime scenes in Jackson on January 7, 2014.

=== Filming ===
Shooting began on November 4, 2013, in Natchez, in and around Natchez through the end of the year, and then in Jackson, Mississippi. On December 20, 2013, the film wrapped up shooting in Natchez. Crews were set to take a holiday break and then return to filming from January 6–24, 2014, in Jackson. Filming got on track again on January 6, 2014, in Jackson. On January 13, 2014, press posted the news that crews had filmed large scenes at Thalia Mara Hall, and they shot other scenes at Mississippi Coliseum, Capitol Street, and some of the restaurants in Jackson. In total Get On Up was shot in 49 days.

== Soundtrack ==
The soundtrack to the film, featured live performances of songs performed by James Brown, and newly produced and arranged renditions of Brown songs produced by the Underdogs. The album was released by Universal Music Enterprises on July 29, 2014.

== Release ==
On September 1, 2014, it was announced that the film would be the opening film of the 2014 Zurich Film Festival.

=== Home media ===
Get On Up was released on DVD and Blu-ray on January 6, 2015. The film made $4,548,027 on domestic DVD sales and $1,609,081 on domestic Blu-ray sales.

=== Marketing ===
On March 13, 2014, Universal released some photos and a first official trailer of the film. A second official trailer was released on May 20.

== Reception ==
=== Critical response ===
On Rotten Tomatoes Get On Up holds an approval rating of 80% based on 167 reviews, with an average rating of 6.88/10. The site's consensus reads: "With an unforgettable Chadwick Boseman in the starring role, Get On Up offers the Godfather of Soul a fittingly dynamic homage." On Metacritic, the film has a weighted average score of 71 out of 100, based on 44 critics, indicating "generally favorable" reviews. Audiences polled by CinemaScore gave the film an average grade of "A" on an A+ to F scale.

Brandon Smith received praise from critics for his brief but memorable role as Little Richard. Music critic Robert Christgau found the film "not just good--great. Better than The Help, which I quite admire, and Ray, which I love. A mite short of a work of genius--it fudges too much and mythologizes beyond the call of narrative necessity. But worthy of the genius who inspired it nevertheless ... Get On Up does justice to his unknowable soul and his unending music, both of which defy closure by definition."

Less favorable reviews include "Get On Up is a cagey, shapeless James Brown biopic" by Ignatiy Vishnevetsky, who rated the film D+ at The A.V. Club, Several other critics noted key facts and incidents omitted in the film, in articles such as "The Social Activist Side of James Brown You Won't See In Get On Up", "The Great Man Theory of Funk: Get On Up shows us James Brown the unstoppable personality, but skimps on James Brown the musician", and "12 Crazy James Brown Moments You Won't See in Get On Up".

=== Box office ===
The film grossed $13.4 million during its opening weekend, finishing in third place at the domestic box office behind fellow new release Guardians of the Galaxy ($94.3 million) and Lucy ($18.3 million).

Get On Up went on to gross $30.7 million in the U.S. and $2.7 million in other territories, for a worldwide total of $33.4 million by September 2014, against a $30 million budget.
