= Indiana Jones and the Dial of Destiny =

2023 film directed by James Mangold

- Theatrical release poster by Tony Stella
- Directed by: James Mangold
- Written by: Jez Butterworth; John-Henry Butterworth; David Koepp; James Mangold
- Based on: Characters by: George Lucas; Philip Kaufman
- Produced by: Kathleen Kennedy; Frank Marshall; Simon Emanuel
- Starring: Harrison Ford; Phoebe Waller-Bridge; Antonio Banderas; John Rhys-Davies; Toby Jones; Boyd Holbrook; Ethann Isidore; Mads Mikkelsen
- Cinematography: Phedon Papamichael
- Edited by: Michael McCusker; Andrew Buckland; Dirk Westervelt
- Music by: John Williams
- Production companies: Walt Disney Pictures; Paramount Pictures; Lucasfilm Ltd.
- Distributed by: Walt Disney Studios Motion Pictures (Note: As part of the 2013 deal transferring the distribution rights of future Indiana Jones films from Paramount Pictures to Walt Disney Studios Motion Pictures, Paramount retained the distribution rights to the first four films and a residual associate credit ("in association with Paramount Pictures") in the film's credits and promotional materials, as well as "financial participation" from the film. Paramount's logo also appears in the film's opening titles alongside Disney and Lucasfilm.)
- Release dates: May 18, 2023 (Cannes); June 30, 2023 (United States)
- Running time: 154 minutes
- Country: United States
- Language: English
- Budget: $419 million (gross) $352.3 million (net) (Note: The film has a gross budget of approximately $419 million, but a tax reimbursement by the United Kingdom brought the net budget down to $352.3 million.)
- Box office: $384 million

Indiana Jones and the Dial of Destiny is a 2023 American action-adventure film directed by James Mangold and written by Mangold, David Koepp, Jez Butterworth, and John-Henry Butterworth. Produced by Walt Disney Pictures, Paramount Pictures and Lucasfilm, it is the fifth and final installment in the Indiana Jones film series and the sequel to Indiana Jones and the Kingdom of the Crystal Skull (2008). Harrison Ford, Karen Allen and John Rhys-Davies reprise their roles from the previous films, with Phoebe Waller-Bridge, Antonio Banderas, Toby Jones, Boyd Holbrook, Ethann Isidore, and Mads Mikkelsen joining the cast. Set in 1969, the film follows Jones and his estranged goddaughter, Helena, who are trying to locate a powerful artifact before Dr. Jürgen Voller, a Nazi-turned-NASA scientist, who plans to use it to alter the outcome of World War II.

Plans for a fifth Indiana Jones film date back to 1979, when a deal was made with Paramount Pictures to produce five Indiana Jones films. George Lucas began researching potential plot devices for a fifth film in 2008, and Koepp was hired to write the screenplay in 2016. In 2018, Jonathan Kasdan replaced Koepp but later left the project. Originally set for release in 2019, the film faced delays due to rewrites and the COVID-19 pandemic. Steven Spielberg was initially set to direct but stepped down in 2020, with Mangold taking over. Filming began in June 2021 in various locations including the United Kingdom, Italy, and Morocco, wrapping in February 2022.

Franchise composer John Williams returned to score the film, earning nominations for Best Original Score at the 96th Academy Awards and Best Score at the 66th Annual Grammy Awards. Williams won the Grammy Award for Best Instrumental Composition for "Helena's Theme".

Indiana Jones and the Dial of Destiny premiered out of competition at the 76th Cannes Film Festival on May 18, 2023, and was released in the United States on June 30, by Walt Disney Studios Motion Pictures. The film grossed $384 million, becoming a box-office bomb due to being one of the most expensive films ever made.

== Plot ==
Towards the end of World War II, Nazis capture Indiana Jones and Oxford archaeologist Basil Shaw as they attempt to retrieve the Spear of Longinus from a castle in the French Alps. Astrophysicist Jürgen Voller informs his superiors the Lance is fake, but he has found half of Archimedes' Dial, the Antikythera mechanism built by the ancient Syracusan mathematician Archimedes which reveals time fissures, thereby allowing for possible time travel. Jones escapes onto a Berlin-bound train filled with looted antiquities and frees Basil. He obtains the Dial piece, and they escape just before Allied warplanes derail the train.

In 1969, twelve years after his adventure in Peru, (Note: As depicted in Indiana Jones and the Kingdom of the Crystal Skull (2008)) Jones, who is retiring from Hunter College in New York City, has been separated from his wife Marion Ravenwood since their son Mutt's death in Vietnam. Jones' goddaughter, archaeologist Helena Shaw, unexpectedly visits and wants to research the Dial. Jones warns that her late father Basil became obsessed with studying it before relinquishing it to Jones to destroy, which he never did.

After Jones and Helena retrieve the Dial half from the college archives, Voller's accomplices attack them. The CIA assists Voller, now working for NASA as "Dr. Schmidt". Helena, revealed as an antiquities smuggler, absconds with the Dial to auction it on the black market. Jones is framed for two colleagues' murders, forcing him to escape through the Apollo 11 moon landing parade, then an anti-war protest.

Jones seeks out his old friend Sallah, now a New York cab driver, who helps him flee the country after surmising that Helena will likely sell the Dial in Tangier. There, Jones disrupts Helena's illegal private auction, but Voller and his henchmen arrive and steal the artifact. Jones, Helena, and her teenage accomplice Teddy Kumar chase them through the streets in a tuk-tuk. The CIA intercepts Voller after the U.S. government disavows him for going rogue, but he and his cohorts murder the agents and steal the CIA helicopter.

Jones, Helena and Teddy trail Voller to Greece and team up with Jones' old friend Renaldo, a professional diver. Guided by Basil's research notes, they dive to the Antikythera wreck and retrieve a "graphikos" tablet containing directions to the Dial's other half. Voller arrives and murders Renaldo and his crew, but Jones' group escapes and heads to Sicily, pursued by Voller.

Inside the Ear of Dionysius cavern, Jones and Helena find Archimedes' tomb, the Dial's second half, and a 20th-century wristwatch on Archimedes' skeletal arm. Voller captures Jones, wounding him. Helena and Teddy escape and chase Voller. Voller reassembles the Dial, intending to time-travel back to 1939 to help lead Germany to victory in World War II by assassinating Adolf Hitler and avoiding his mistakes. At an airfield, Voller activates the Dial and locates a time fissure in the sky. Jones is held captive on Voller's stolen plane while Helena stows away via its landing gear. Teddy follows in another plane.

While approaching the fissure, Jones realizes that continental drift would have altered the timeline coordinates. Rather than 1939, the group arrives at the Siege of Syracuse in 214 BC. The warring armies shoot down Voller's plane, believing it is a dragon. Jones and Helena parachute out just before it crashes, killing all aboard, while Teddy lands safely. Archimedes finds Voller's body and wristwatch in the wreckage. He gives Jones the Dial but keeps the watch. Jones and Helena learn that Archimedes created the Dial to bring allies from the future through fissures that lead only to 214 BC to save Syracuse and lift the siege. As the fissure begins to collapse, Jones wants to remain behind. Helena, fearing a time paradox and unwilling to give up on him, knocks Jones out with a punch. Back in 1969, a recovering Jones awakens in his apartment and reunites with Helena, Teddy, Sallah and Marion, with whom he reconciles.

== Cast ==
- Harrison Ford as Dr. Henry "Indiana" Jones Jr., a world-renowned globe-trotting archaeologist and college professor.
  - Anthony Ingruber as young Indiana Jones (1944). Ingruber had portrayed a younger version of Ford's character William Jones in The Age of Adaline (2015), serving as the on-set body double before Ford's de-aged likeness and voice was inserted over Ingruber's using CGI for brief parts of the 1944 scenes of Dial of Destiny. Ingruber also portrays a hotel guest attending Helena's auction.
- Phoebe Waller-Bridge as Helena Shaw, Jones' goddaughter. The filmmakers described the character as "slippery, charming, the girl next door, a grifter," a "pioneer in ethical accounting" and similar to comedic characters with "machine-gun" dialogue akin to those of Ben Hecht's plays. She is the daughter of Indy's old friend and colleague, Basil Shaw. Holly Lawton portrays a young Helena.
- Mads Mikkelsen as Dr. Jürgen Voller, a sociopathic German scientist, astrophysicist and former Nazi during World War II who has been hired by NASA under the name "Dr. Schmidt" to run the Apollo Moon landing program, while using CIA assets for his own gain. The character is based on real-life Nazi Wernher von Braun, while his dressing style is inspired by previous Indiana Jones villain Major Arnold Ernst Toht. Mikkelsen deemed Toht iconic for Ronald Lacey's performance but sought to avoid copying him. He also denied any connection between the two, as "Toht was more of a henchman" while Voller is the "brain" behind a lot of things. Mikkelsen felt that Voller is a man who would like to "correct" some mistakes of the past with the film's MacGuffin to make the world "a much better place to live in," matching wits against Jones in a race to retrieve the artifact.
- Antonio Banderas as Renaldo, an old friend of Jones who operates as an expert frogman. Banderas claimed that his character is a rogue who is "a good guy who dies for Indiana Jones". He enjoyed working with Ford, Mangold and Steven Spielberg, who co-produced The Mask of Zorro (1998), one of his previous films. Banderas also pointed out that his role as Renaldo veers more into a cameo appearance.
- John Rhys-Davies as Sallah, Jones' old friend who aided in finding the Ark of the Covenant in 1936 and the Holy Grail in 1938. Sallah and his family have since immigrated to New York City with Jones' assistance. He now works as a cab driver.
- Toby Jones as Basil Shaw, an Oxford professor of archaeology, ally of Jones from his days in World War II, and Helena's father, who was obsessed with the Dial.
- Boyd Holbrook as Klaber, Voller's nefarious and trigger-happy right-hand man in 1969. Holbrook described Klaber as Voller's lapdog, "and a very crazy one at that".
- Ethann Isidore as Teddy Kumar, Helena's young Moroccan sidekick in Tangier.
- Karen Allen as Marion Ravenwood, Jones' estranged wife, who aided in finding the Ark of the Covenant in 1936 and the Crystal Skull of Akator in 1957.
- Shaunette Renée Wilson as Agent Mason, a CIA agent assigned to work for Voller.
- Thomas Kretschmann as Colonel Weber, a Nazi for whom Voller works in 1944.
- Olivier Richters as Hauke, a henchman of Voller.
- Mark Killeen as Pontimus, a soldier from 212 BC during the Siege of Syracuse.
- Nasser Memarzia as Archimedes, a brilliant scientist from 212 BC Syracuse and inventor of the Antikythera ("Dial of Destiny").
- Martin McDougall as Durkin, a CIA agent working with Voller. The role marked a return to the franchise for McDougall, who had previously portrayed Red Cross worker Joe in The Young Indiana Jones Chronicles episode "Northern Italy, June 1918" (later edited into the first half of the film Tales of Innocence).
- Alaa Safi as Aziz Rahim, the son of a Moroccan mobster, who was previously engaged to Helena Shaw.
- Anna Francolini as Mandy, one of Jones' colleagues at Hunter College.

Photographs of Sean Connery and Shia LaBeouf are used to represent their respective Last Crusade and Kingdom of the Crystal Skull characters: Henry Jones Sr. and Mutt Williams (Henry Jones III).

== Production ==
=== Development ===
In 1979, George Lucas and Steven Spielberg made a deal with Paramount Pictures for five Indiana Jones films. In April 2008, Harrison Ford said he would return as Indiana Jones for a fifth film if it did not take another twenty years to develop, referring to the long development of Indiana Jones and the Kingdom of the Crystal Skull (2008), which was released a month later. That film introduced the character Mutt Williams, played by Shia LaBeouf. Writer/producer Lucas suggested an idea to make Williams the lead character in a fifth film with Ford's Jones in a supporting capacity akin to that of Sean Connery's Henry Jones Sr., but later decided against this. Lucas said that Ford's age would not be an issue in making another film, saying, "it's not like he's an old man. He's incredibly agile; he looks even better than he did 20 years ago".

Lucas began researching potential plot devices for another film in 2008, and stated that Spielberg was open to directing it, as he had done for the previous films. Explaining the process for each film, Ford said, "We come to some basic agreement and then George goes away for a long time and works on it. Then Steven and I get it in some form, some embryonic form. Then if we like it we start working with George on it and at some point down the line it's ready and we do it". Lucas stressed the importance of having a MacGuffin that is supernatural but still grounded in reality with an archaeological or historical background, saying, "you can't just make something up, like a time machine". Speaking about the previous film and the franchise's future, Lucas said, "we still have the issues about the direction we'd like to take. I'm in the future; Steven's in the past. He's trying to drag it back to the way they were, I'm trying to push it to a whole different place. So, still we have a sort of tension". Later in 2008, Ford stated that Lucas's concept for the fifth film was "crazy but great". In November 2010, Ford said that Lucas was still working on the project. In July 2012, producer Frank Marshall stated that the project had no writer and said about its progress, "I don't know if it's definitely not happening, but it's not up and running".

In October 2012, The Walt Disney Company acquired Lucasfilm, giving Disney ownership rights to the Indiana Jones intellectual property. In December 2013, The Walt Disney Studios purchased the distribution and marketing rights to future Indiana Jones films from Paramount, with Paramount retaining the distribution rights to the first four films and receiving "financial participation" for any additional films as well as an "in association with" credit in the film's billing. The fifth film would become the first and only in the series to be co-produced by Walt Disney Pictures and Lucasfilm. With the 2012 acquisition, Lucas passed Indiana Jones 5 to new Lucasfilm president Kathleen Kennedy. Lucasfilm planned to focus on the Star Wars franchise before working on a fifth Indiana Jones film.

In May 2015, Kennedy confirmed that Lucasfilm would eventually make another Indiana Jones film. Kingdom of the Crystal Skull ended positively for Indiana Jones, with his marriage to Marion Ravenwood. However, Ford did not necessarily view the film as a definitive ending for Jones, wishing to make one more film that could expand the character and conclude his journey. Ford felt that Crystal Skull "ended in kind of a suspended animation. There was not a real strong feeling of the conclusion or the closure that I always hoped for". According to Kennedy, "we all felt that if we could conclude the series with one more movie, given the fact that Harrison was so excited to try to do another one, we should do it". Kennedy, Spielberg and Ford had discussed a couple of story ideas by the end of 2015.

=== Pre-production ===
In March 2016, Disney announced that the fifth film would be released on July 19, 2019, with Ford reprising his role. Spielberg would direct the film, with Kennedy and Marshall as producers. In April 2016, Marshall said the film was in early pre-production. A MacGuffin had been chosen for the film, and work on the script began a few months later, with David Koepp as the screenwriter. The story was conceived by Koepp and Spielberg. Koepp had previously written several other Spielberg films, including Kingdom of the Crystal Skull. It was initially reported that Lucas would not be involved in the project, although Spielberg later said that Lucas would serve as an executive producer: "Of course I would never make an Indiana Jones film without George Lucas. That would be insane". Later in 2016, it was announced that Lucas would have no involvement, with Marshall stating two years later that "life changes and we're moving on. He moved on".

In 2017, the film's release date was pushed back to 2020, as Spielberg was busy working on Ready Player One (2018) and The Post (2017). Koepp said "we've got a script we're mostly happy with". Spielberg set Indiana Jones 5 as his next film, with production set to begin in the UK in April 2019. However, filming was pushed back as a final script had yet to be approved. In early 2018, Lucasfilm met with screenwriters Scott Beck and Bryan Woods for an "open canvas talk" including the Indiana Jones and Star Wars franchises in the wake of their success with John Krasinski's film A Quiet Place (2018). Beck stated that they had considered writing the next Indiana Jones installment, but that ultimately he and Woods were more interested in establishing an original franchise. Marshall said that a lot of people had pitched ideas for the film. Jonathan Kasdan was eventually hired to replace Koepp in mid-2018, and a new release date was set for 2021.

Kasdan had departed the project by May 2019, and it was rumored that writer Dan Fogelman would take over. In September 2019, Koepp announced that he had re-joined the production as writer, stating that the filmmakers had "a good idea this time". Koepp ultimately wrote two versions of the film, but neither were approved. He said that efforts to produce the film had failed because of disagreement between Spielberg, Ford, and Disney regarding the script.

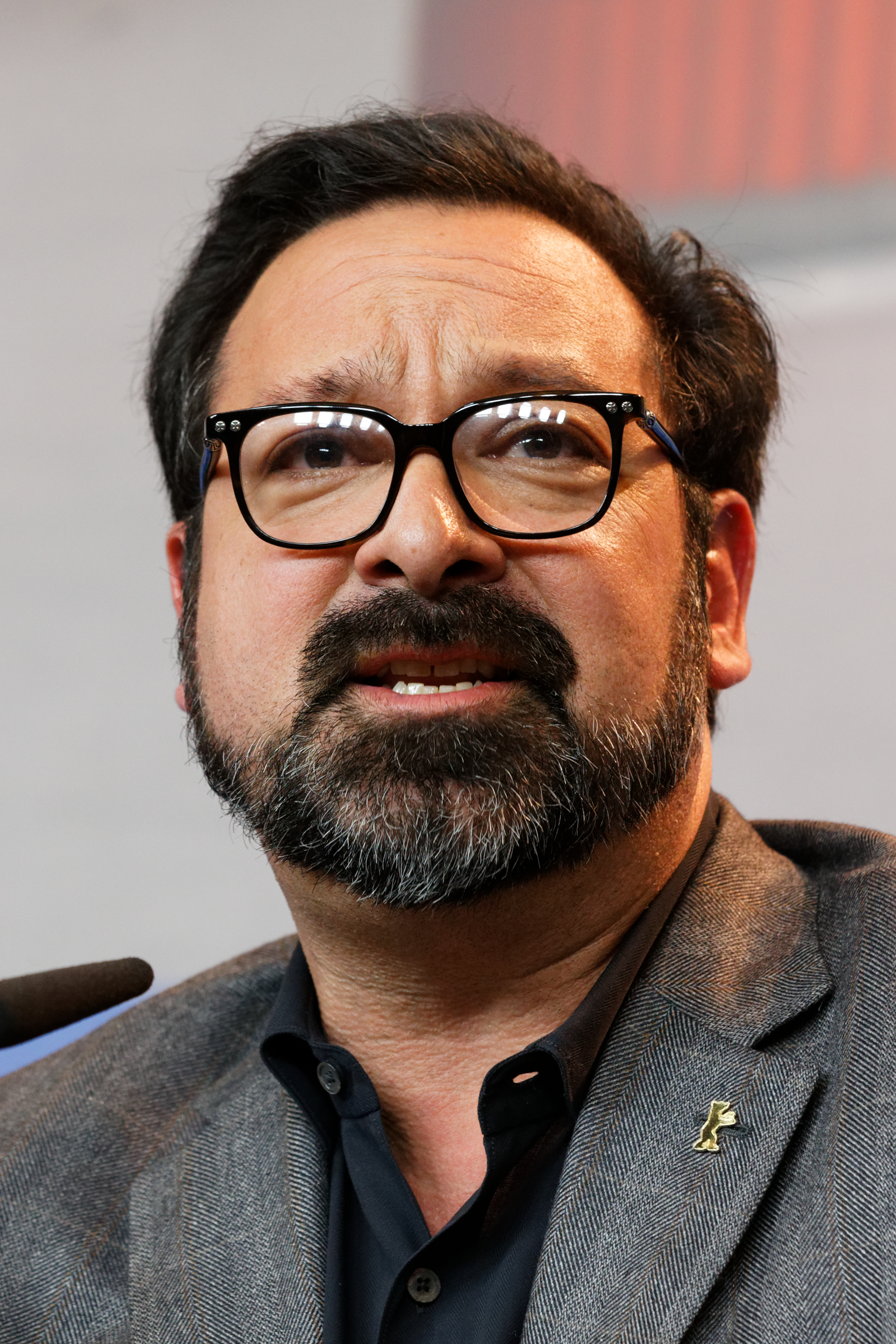
James Mangold, seen in 2017, directed and co-wrote the film.

In February 2020, Spielberg stepped down as director, as he wanted to pass the film series to a new filmmaker for a fresh perspective. Kennedy later said that Spielberg "was kind of off and on" about directing the project, although he did remain as a hands-on producer. James Mangold was confirmed as director in May 2020, when he began work on a new script. He had previously offered Ford a role in his film Ford v Ferrari (2019) and the two also worked together on The Call of the Wild (2020), which Mangold produced. As a result of this relationship, Ford suggested that Spielberg and Kennedy hire Mangold as director. He is the first person besides Spielberg to direct a film in the series.

Koepp departed the project again after Spielberg stepped down, saying it "seemed like the right time to let Jim have his own take on it and have his own person or himself write it". Mangold had considered turning down the director position, as Lucasfilm wanted filming to begin in about six months to meet the 2021 release date. However, Mangold wanted more time so he could refine the script. He eventually signed on to the project after the COVID-19 pandemic pushed back the release date, giving him the time he wanted. The pandemic had also shut down pre-production on A Complete Unknown (2024), Mangold's film about singer Bob Dylan.

Mangold wrote the new screenplay with Jez and John-Henry Butterworth, who worked with him previously on Ford v Ferrari, over the course of six to eight months. Mangold said, "I wanted to really retool the existing script pretty aggressively, almost entirely". Koepp received credit alongside Mangold and the Butterworths for his earlier work. Among the previous films in the series, Mangold cited the first entry, Raiders of the Lost Ark (1981), as his biggest inspiration while making Dial of Destiny. He considered Raiders his favorite film in the series, and said "you go to the original because that's where the standard was set".

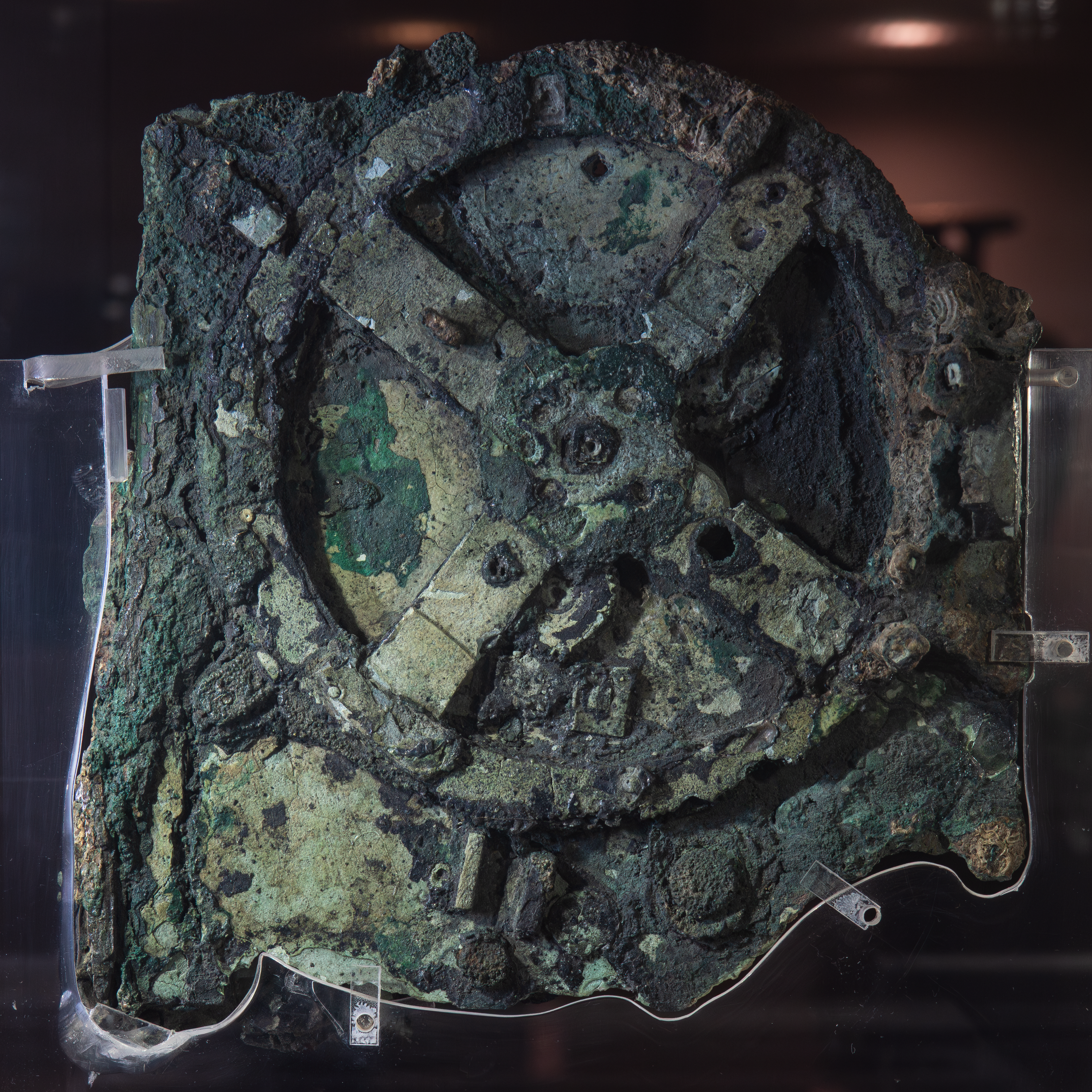
The main fragment of the real Antikythera mechanism, which serves as the film's MacGuffin

Mangold conceived the film's time-travel element and its use of the Antikythera mechanism as the MacGuffin. To suit the story, artistic liberty was taken with the film's dial, giving it the ability to detect time fissures. Mangold considered time travel on par with the previous films: "It's no more of a wild swing in my mind than ghouls flying out of a box and melting people's heads through the sheer power of dark angels, or a 700-year-old knight existing in a cave for perpetuity. These are all beyond the scope of all physical belief". According to Mangold, the earlier draft by Koepp featured a MacGuffin that was "just another relic with power, similar to the relics we had seen", with no emotional connection to Jones. Multiple versions of the film's dial would be created by the prop department for different scenes. Although Greek inventor Archimedes is presented in the film as the Antikythera's creator, it is unclear whether that is true in reality.

Earlier films had featured Nazis as the antagonists, and Mangold and the Butterworths were inspired by Operation Paperclip as a way of reincorporating them for Dial of Destiny. Mangold considered Nazi Germany for the film's time-traveling final act, with Jones attempting to stop Voller's plan. However, as this idea was developed further, Mangold considered it too predictable. He also found that it lacked emotional resonance for Jones and played out like a spy film, prompting him to choose the Siege of Syracuse instead. The Butterworths suggested the idea to end the film with Jones and Marion discussing their emotional pain, a callback to a similar conversation in Raiders. A post-credits scene featuring Short Round from Indiana Jones and the Temple of Doom (1984) was considered according to storyboard artist Gabriel Hardman, but the idea was discarded early on so Ke Huy Quan wasn't contacted to reprise the role, with Mangold opting to not bring Shorty back because he wanted to assemble a story in the film's present that made sense and did not want to include another adult companion for Indy, since Helena Shaw was only included to challenge him as the adventure's sole female character.

Mangold consulted with Lucas and Spielberg, who served as executive producers. As the script was being written, Mangold would send pages to the duo for input. Recalling advice that Spielberg offered, Mangold said, "It's a movie that's a trailer from beginning to end — always be moving".

=== Casting ===
Despite Ford's age, Marshall and Spielberg ruled out the possibility of recasting his character. Ford said, "I'm Indiana Jones. When I'm gone, he's gone". Spielberg also said Jones would not be killed off during the events of the film. Likewise, Mangold and the Butterworths never considered killing off the character, despite fan assumptions Mangold would "kill another icon" after doing so with James "Logan" Howlett / Wolverine in the X-Men (2000-2020) film Logan (2017). Ford was paid $10–12 million for his involvement.

In April 2021, Phoebe Waller-Bridge, Mads Mikkelsen and Thomas Kretschmann were cast in undisclosed roles. Boyd Holbrook and Shaunette Renée Wilson were added the next month. Holbrook previously co-starred in Mangold's Logan, in which he portrayed Donald Pierce, also a second-in-command villain; this made him initially hesitant to accept the similar role of Klaber. Wilson was cast without auditioning, after a Zoom meeting with Mangold, who agreed to change the "problematic" way in which Mason originally exited the film because some dialogue had made Wilson uncomfortable. She felt that her character's government connections fit into the story in a similar way to how the Federal Bureau of Investigation (FBI) and the CIA recruited black agents to infiltrate the Black Panther Party in the 1960s. In July 2021, Antonio Banderas was cast in the film portraying an ally to Indiana Jones. Ethann Isidore was cast as Teddy Kumar, marking his film debut.

Waller-Bridge described her character as "a mystery and a wonder", and Mangold referred the actress to Barbara Stanwyck's performance as Jean Harrington in The Lady Eve (1941) as a key reference point. Mangold and the Butterworths wrote the role specifically for Waller-Bridge, inspired by Karen Allen's performance as Marion Ravenwood in Raiders of the Lost Ark. Waller-Bridge performed many of her own stunts.

Mikkelsen said the script was "everything I wished it to be". His character was partly inspired by the Nazi scientists involved with NASA, including Wernher von Braun. Like most villainous characters he has played throughout his career, Mikkelsen described Voller as a "misunderstood person". He also described his character as restrained: "We tried to avoid the cliché of the German or the Nazi with the extreme accent and the extreme madness. We wanted him to be a man who kind of blended in once he moved to America because he's predominantly a scientist".

John Rhys-Davies reprised his role of Sallah for the first time since Indiana Jones and the Last Crusade (1989). Allen also expressed interest in reprising her role as Marion, noting in 2011 that she and Jones were married in the previous film "so it would be difficult, I think, to move forward without her". Allen's return was kept a secret in the years leading up to the film's premiere; she said "whenever anyone asked me if I was in the film or not, I had to come up with something to say, like, 'I could tell you, but then I'd have to kill you.'" Her scene was shot in a day and a half, with the use of a grey wig. Allen was happy to reprise the character, although she wished she could have had a larger role as part of the film's adventure. Spielberg's version of the film would have featured Marion in more scenes with Jones. Mangold's initial script upon his hiring didn't include Marion at all, but upon being informed of the decision, Allen penned a letter to Mangold, Spielberg and Kennedy about why her character's absence would be a "terrible mistake", receiving the following day a reply from Kennedy, who agreed that she was right and resulted in the addition of the film's final scene of Marion and Indy's reconciliation. Jim Broadbent expressed a willingness to reprise his role as Charles Stanforth from Kingdom of the Crystal Skull, but ultimately did not return.

Following the release of Crystal Skull, LaBeouf criticized the film and Spielberg, although Mangold said this did not factor into Mutt's absence in Dial of Destiny, saying "there's only so many people you can edge into a picture". He further said about Mutt, "I didn't think his whole thing worked that well in the previous film". As in the earlier films, Mangold wanted to instead capture "that wonderful energy between Indy and an intrepid female character". Mangold kept his options open about Mutt still being alive and simply off-screen, although he said "The reality is you want the story to focus on the characters that are in the picture. And so saying someone's out wandering off in the periphery seems sadder purgatory than actually making them a story point in the film and using their character's existence as a tremendous source of drama for some of our lead characters". Mutt was also absent from Koepp's original draft.

=== Filming ===
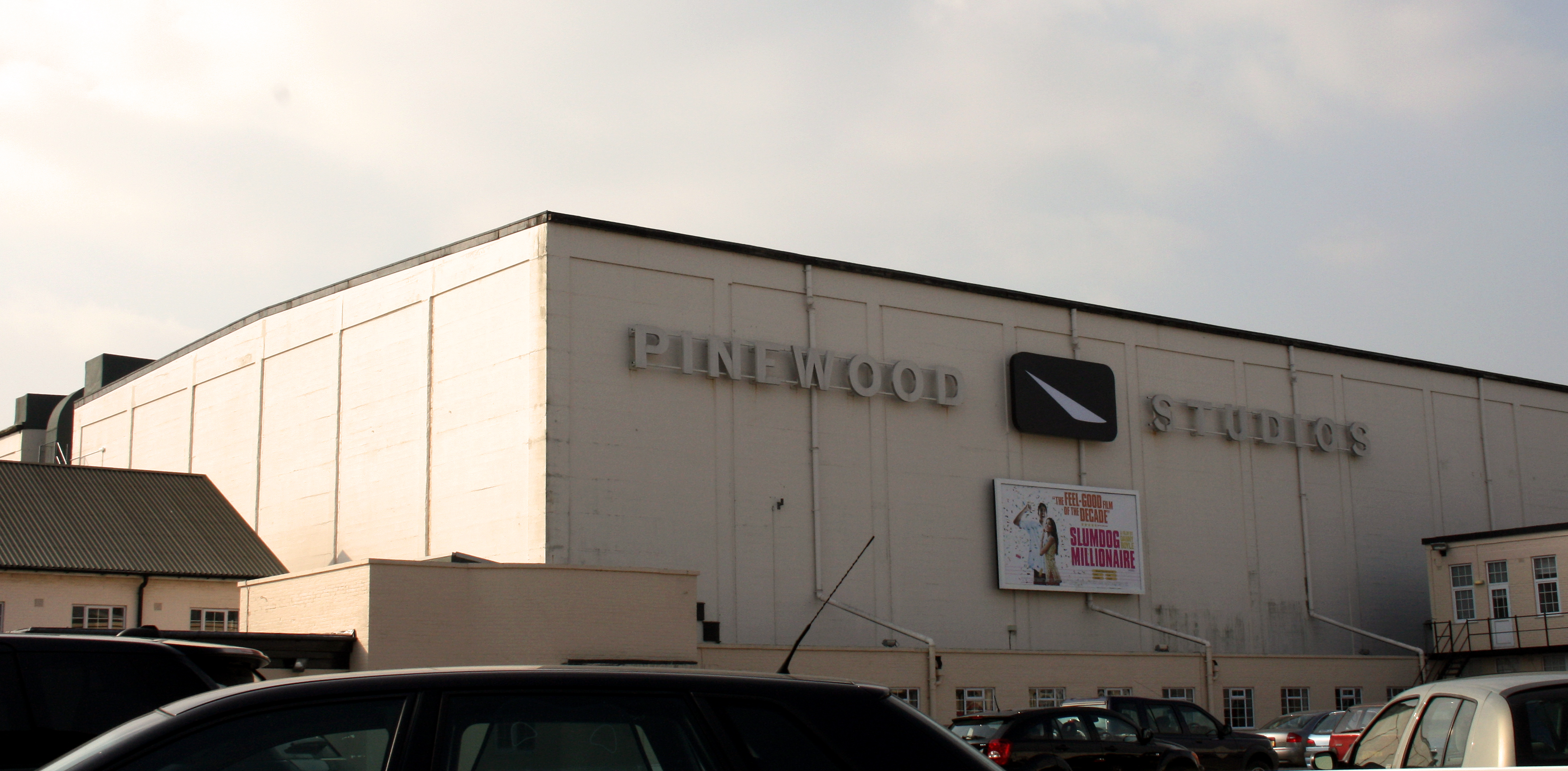
Pinewood Studios in England housed a number of sets for the film.

Although Crystal Skull was largely shot in the U.S., Marshall said that the fifth film would return to a global range of filming locations like the earlier films. Mangold was opposed to using the StageCraft virtual production technology developed by Industrial Light & Magic (ILM) for Lucasfilm's The Mandalorian (2019–present), wanting to rely mainly on practical effects. Because of pandemic quarantines, a remote location scouting system was used in some instances, in which scouters were sent to prospective areas with a camera to broadcast the sites to Mangold and production designer Adam Stockhausen.

Principal photography began in England on June 4, 2021. Sound stage filming took place at Pinewood Studios, and on-site filming locations included Bamburgh Castle and the North Yorkshire Moors Railway near Grosmont. The latter locations were used for the opening sequence, including a train chase and a motorcycle scene involving Ford's stunt double, who wore a mask resembling Ford's younger face. Ford himself was spotted in Grosmont on June 7, 2021. The railway bridge scenes were filmed in mid-June 2021, at Leaderfoot Viaduct near Melrose in the Scottish Borders. The train's interior design was inspired by Hitler's personal train, the Führersonderzug, and the interior scenes were filmed on a set at Pinewood Studios.

A motorcycle chase was shot in the Scottish village of Glencoe, and other Scottish locations included Biggar, South Lanarkshire. Later in June, location shooting moved to London, where a street in Hackney was lined with vintage cars. Filming also took place inside a private residence that was reportedly chosen for its period-style interior. Ford preferred to do his own stunts. On June 23, it was announced that he had injured his shoulder during the rehearsal of a fight scene and that the production crew would shoot around his recovery. Ford's injury occurred while rehearsing a punch against Mikkelsen's character for the train sequence.

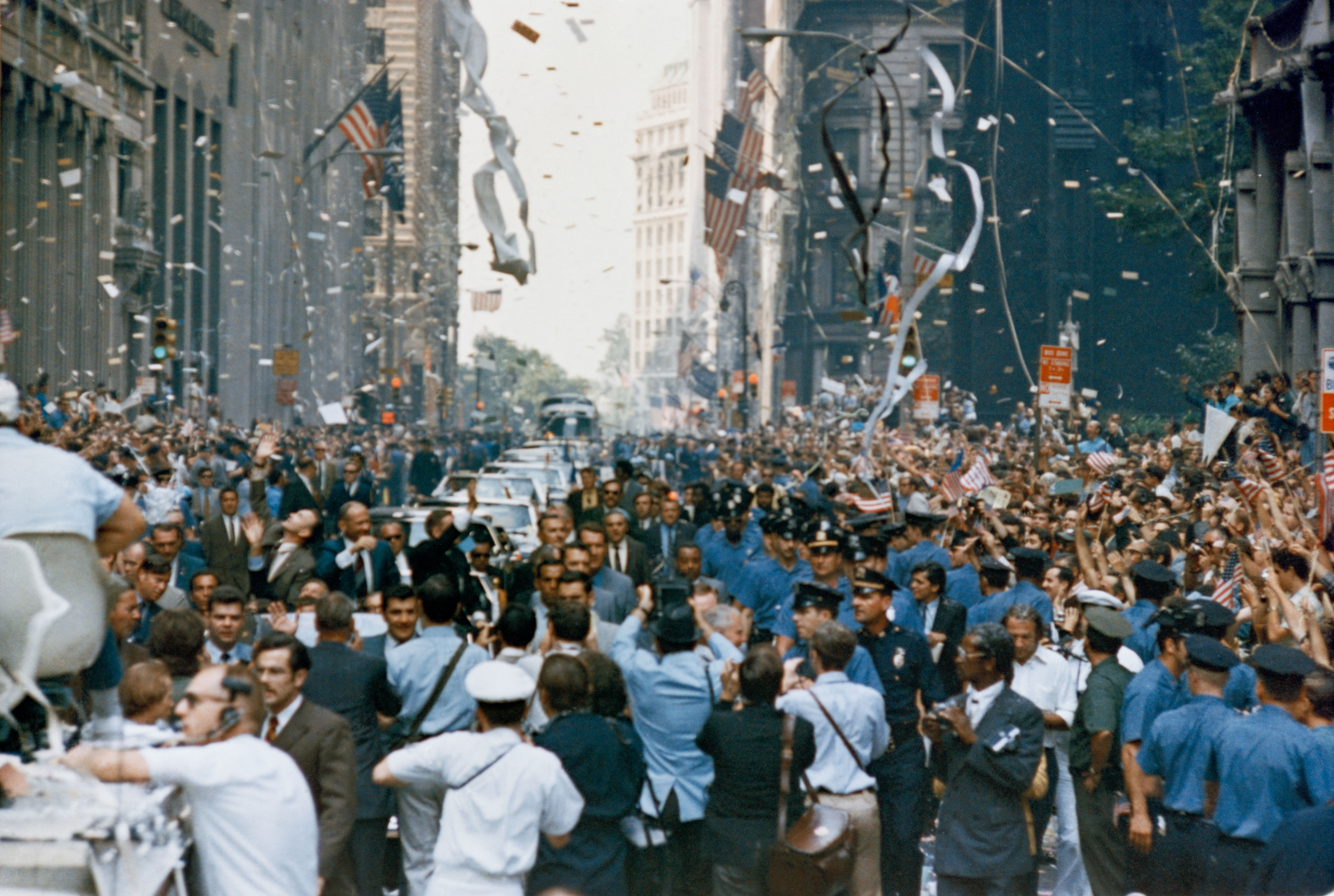
A ticker-tape parade for the Apollo 11 astronauts in New York City on August 13, 1969

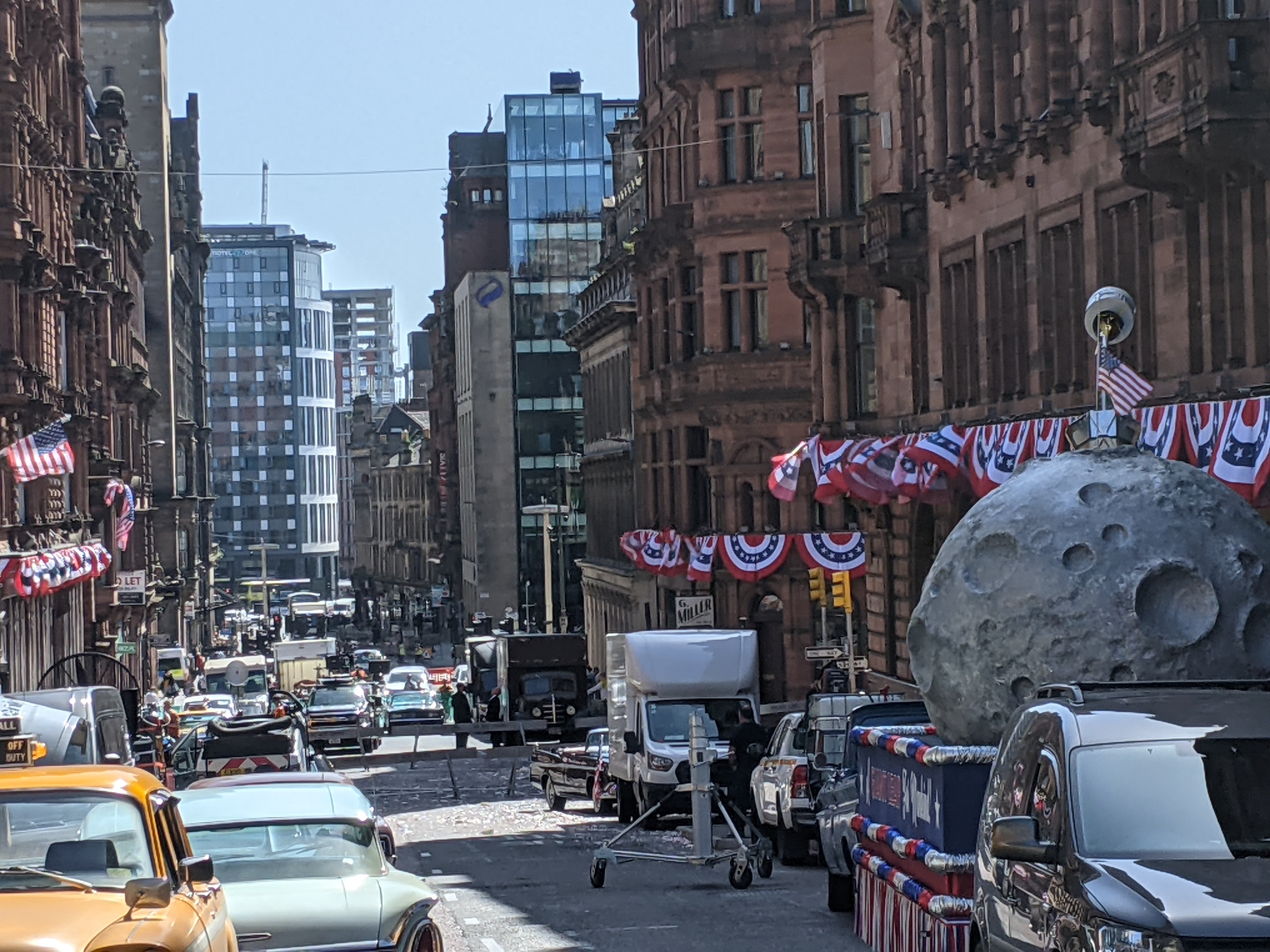
Recreation of the parade for filming in Glasgow, July 15, 2021

In July 2021, shooting moved to Glasgow's city centre, which was transformed to resemble New York City in 1969. Meticulous detail went into efforts to recreate the location and time period. A chase sequence, shot along St. Vincent Street and other areas, re-creates a ticker tape parade celebrating the return of the Apollo 11 astronauts. A stunt double, Mike Massa, performed in place of Ford throughout the Glasgow shoot, with motion capture markers applied to his face. Holbrook and Waller-Bridge were on set as well. The sequence also featured 1,000 background actors as parade-goers and Vietnam War protestors. Filming in Glasgow lasted two weeks. Ford resumed filming in September 2021, and some shooting took place in the Hatton Garden area of London, which also doubled as New York City. In addition, a replica of a New York City Subway station was built at Pinewood's 007 Stage. By September 16, over 50 crew members from Pinewood Studios productions, mainly from Dial of Destiny and the Marvel Cinematic Universe (MCU) film Ant-Man and the Wasp: Quantumania (2023), contracted norovirus following an outbreak at the studio. The main cast was not affected.

In October 2021, production moved to Sicily, Italy, after the ending between Ford and Allen was shot. The Italian shoot included nearly 600 crew members, and took place throughout Sicily, which stood in for itself and Greece. Filming began in the city of Syracuse. Other shooting locations included the city of Cefalù, often standing in for Syracuse, and the Province of Trapani. Filming in Trapani included the towns of Marsala and Castellammare del Golfo, the latter serving as the harbor where Renaldo meets with Jones. Mangold wanted to include an underwater treasure-hunting sequence, a first for the film series. The diving scenes were photographed by cinematographer Ian Seabrook, and filmed on-location in the Mediterranean Sea and in a tank at Pinewood, the latter done with stunt performers.

The sequence involving Archimedes' tomb was filmed at Pinewood. The scenes leading up to the tomb sequence were shot at the Temple of Segesta in Trapani, as well as the Neapolis archaeological park in Syracuse. Filming at the latter location included the Ear of Dionysius cave, and the Grotta Dei Cordari cave. Scenes depicting the Roman siege were shot in Sicily as well, including Castello Maniace in Syracuse.

Filming began in Morocco on October 17, 2021, taking place in the cities of Fez and Oujda. The Morocco segment was originally set to film in India – specifically the cities of Jaisalmer and Jaipur in the state of Rajasthan – until the COVID-19 levels there increased. Kathmandu in Nepal was then considered, until an outbreak occurred there as well. The Moroccan shoot consisted of exterior filming, while the interiors of the Hotel L'Atlantique were recreated at Pinewood. The Tangier chase sequence required the use of a dozen tuk-tuks, and was shot in Fez primarily by a second unit crew, while the actors filmed their portions of the sequence later on at Pinewood, with the use of a blue screen. On November 4, a camera operator named Nic Cupac was found dead in his Morocco hotel room; Disney stated that his death was not production-related.

After Morocco, the remainder of filming took place at Pinewood, eventually wrapping on February 26, 2022. Post-production began nine days later, although some film editing had already taken place while shooting. Michael McCusker, Andrew Buckland and Dirk Westervelt served as the film editors, replacing Michael Kahn, who had edited the previous four films. Phedon Papamichael served as cinematographer, marking his sixth film with Mangold. Papamichael sought advice from Spielberg's longtime cinematographer Janusz Kamiński, who worked on Crystal Skull. Spielberg offered his advice on the script, watched dailies, and later visited the editing room a number of times. He praised the finished film.

=== Visual effects ===
As with the previous films, visual effects were handled by Industrial Light & Magic (ILM), a division of Lucasfilm. Dial of Destiny has a total of 2,350 effects shots, including many that occur during the Syracuse siege sequence. The time fissure, depicted as a stormy cloud portal, was made entirely through computer-generated imagery (CGI) and was among the final effects created for the film. The fissure design was based on research conducted into real cloud formations, as Mangold wanted it to look natural.

In addition to ILM, several other visual effects companies also worked on the film and spent more than a year in post-production. After ILM, Rising Sun Pictures was the second-largest contributor of visual effects; it handled 301 shots, most of them during the parade sequence. Important Looking Pirates worked on 250 shots, mostly for the underwater sequence. Soho VFX contributed 235 shots, most of them for the tuk-tuk chase sequence. The Hotel L'Atlantique exterior was also created by Soho through CGI.

==== De-aging ====
Spielberg used motion capture for his animated film The Adventures of Tintin (2011), although he rejected the idea of using this method to digitally de-age Ford, saying in 2012 that he wanted the actor's age to be acknowledged in the film. By mid-2019, Spielberg and Koepp had devised a five-minute World War II opening sequence that would feature a de-aged Ford. Upon taking over the project, Mangold expanded the sequence to roughly 25 minutes.

More than 100 ILM artists worked on the opening sequence over a three-year period, using various methods. Ford was de-aged to depict his appearance during the first three Indiana Jones films. This was partly achieved using new artificial intelligence software from ILM, which looked through archived footage of a younger Ford in his previous work for Lucasfilm, including the original Star Wars films (1977–1983). Ford's head was also scanned to create a younger version using CGI. Lighting techniques were emphasized on-set and included the use of Flux, a light-based capture system previously used for de-aging scenes in The Irishman (2019). In addition to effects, a mask of Ford's younger face was also made for use by a stuntman during a motorcycle chase.

After filming, the de-aging footage was modified shot-by-shot using a variety of techniques. ILM artists had particular difficulty getting Ford's eyes to look right. According to visual effects supervisor Robert Weaver, "Many times, we weren't quite getting the right balance of the eye-opening and the shape of the overall eyes, and were continually having to reference both older footage and what was shot in camera". Ford was somewhat "spooked" by the de-aging process, but was nonetheless impressed. Mikkelsen was also de-aged for the opening sequence.

=== Music ===
In June 2016, Spielberg confirmed that John Williams, who scored the previous films in the Indiana Jones franchise, would return to compose the music for the fifth film. In 2022, Williams stated that it would be his final film score, following plans for a retirement, though he later backtracked on this decision. Williams premiered one of his compositions, "Helena's Theme", at the Hollywood Bowl on September 2, 2022, at Mangold's request. Walt Disney Records released the soundtrack album digitally on June 29, 2023, and physically through CD and vinyl LP formats on August 9, 2023.

Dial of Destiny also features several songs not included on the album release, including The Beatles' "Magical Mystery Tour" (attributed to the Lennon–McCartney partnership in the credits), David Bowie's "Space Oddity", and "La Fogaraccia" from Nino Rota's score for the Federico Fellini film Amarcord (1973).

=== Budget ===
The film reportedly cost around $419 million to produce, although a reimbursement of $66.7 million (£50.3 million) from the United Kingdom brought down the net budget to a total of $352.3 million. Initial reports listed a gross budget of $294.7 million, with $55.8 million (£46.2 million) tax credit bringing its net costs down to $238.9 million. Other figures, including "$300 million+," and "$387.2 million" had also been reported. Indiana Jones and the Dial of Destiny is the most expensive film in the Indiana Jones franchise, as well as one of the most expensive films ever made.

== Themes and influences ==
Ford and Mangold both felt that Crystal Skull did not do enough to highlight Jones' age and the new era in which he lives. Speaking about Dial of Destiny as a finale to the franchise, Mangold said, "It became really important to me to figure out how to make this a movie about a hero at sunset". He said that Jones' age would be a major part of the film, something that was touched upon only briefly in the earlier drafts: "The issues I brought up about Indy's age were not things I thought were being addressed in the material being developed at the time. There were 'old' jokes, but the material itself wasn't about it. To me, whatever your greatest liability, you should fly straight towards that. If you try to pretend it's not there, you end up getting slings and arrows the whole way". According to Mangold and Ford, Dial of Destiny is about age, time and family relationships. Mangold said the film "is not about aging per se, but time — the way time travels for all of us, the way we all get older as the world changes around us".

Mangold said of the film's cinematic style that the opening sequence, set in 1944, is meant to contrast with the main plot, which takes place in 1969, allowing the film to start with a blast of classic Indiana Jones action reminiscent of the first three films (1981–1989). The transition from the pulpy cinematic language of 1940s films brings the characters from an "older world" into the "modern" 1960s, a present strongly influenced by the Cold War, nuclear power, space travel, intrigue and the lack of black-and-white morality. Mangold sought to portray "an accurate and realistic appraisal of where this character would be at this time in his life", describing Jones as "a hero who is used to a black and white world" when it comes to villains, who now finds himself in a gray world with a lack of "clear good guys and bad guys". Jez Butterworth noted the presence of ex-Nazis involved in the U.S. government's Moon-landing program. This makes Jones grow distrustful of his country, feeling like a man out of time in an era in which idealism is gone. It was Ford's idea to start the 1969 storyline with Jones at a low point in his life, and then gradually "rebuild him from the ground up" as the film progresses.

Mangold compared Dial of Destiny to his final X-Men film Logan, enjoying the notion of what a hero can do for the world when it no longer has a place for him, allowing classical heroes to be seen through the "prism" of today's "jaundiced contemporary attitudes". However, Dial of Destiny would lack the seriousness of Logan, with the latter being regarded as a "purposefully and intentionally" grim adventure.

== Release ==
=== Marketing ===
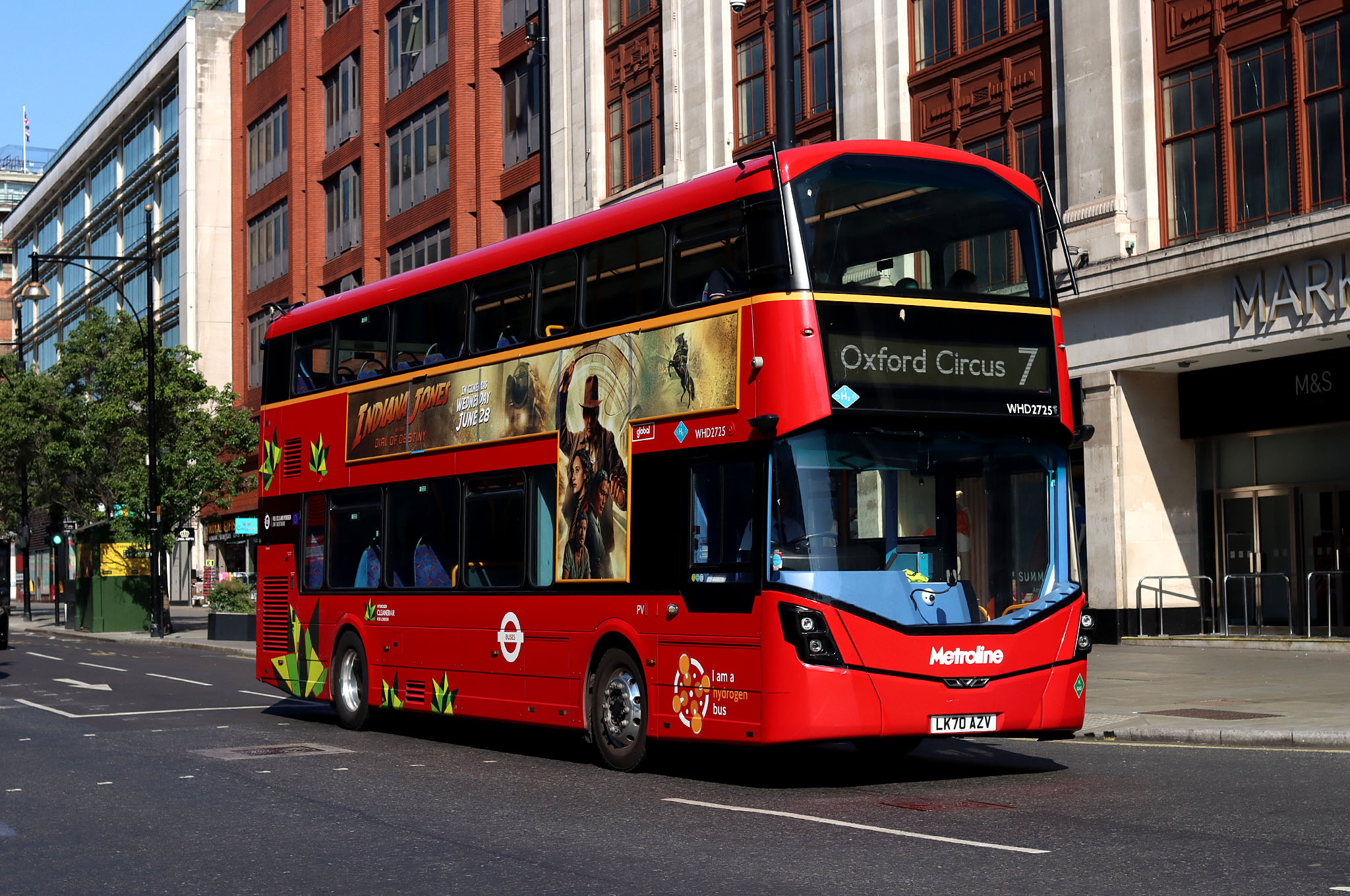
A bus advertising the film in London

During Star Wars Celebration in May 2022, Ford debuted the first official image from the film, showing Jones silhouetted in a cave. Exclusive footage was shown to attendees at the D23 Expo in September 2022. The footage included shots of a de-aged Ford and multiple action sequences, and confirmed the return of Rhys-Davies. The film's title, Indiana Jones and the Dial of Destiny, was revealed on December 1, 2022, alongside the first trailer for the film. The Escapist's John Friscia found the trailer's nod to Raiders of the Lost Ark amusing but hoped that the film wouldn't rely on nostalgia. A TV spot for the film aired during Super Bowl LVII on February 12, 2023. A new trailer and poster debuted at the 2023 Star Wars Celebration on April 7, 2023.

=== Theatrical ===
Indiana Jones and the Dial of Destiny had its world premiere at the 76th Cannes Film Festival, screening out-of-competition, on May 18, 2023, exactly fifteen years after the Cannes premiere of The Kingdom of the Crystal Skull. The film received a "lukewarm" five-minute standing ovation and received a divisive reaction from attending critics. It was theatrically released in the United States on June 30, 2023, by Walt Disney Studios Motion Pictures in IMAX, Dolby Cinema, 4DX, ScreenX, and other premium formats. It was initially set for release on July 19, 2019, taking off the then-planned release date for the Marvel Cinematic Universe (MCU) unproduced Inhumans film by Marvel Studios, but was delayed in April 2017 to July 10, 2020, with The Lion King (2019) taking its former spot. It then shifted to July 9, 2021, and was further delayed to July 29, 2022, following the impact of the COVID-19 pandemic on the film industry. Its final release date was announced in October 2021. Internationally, the film was released on dates ranging from June 28 to 30.

=== Home media ===
Indiana Jones and the Dial of Destiny was released on digital formats on August 29, 2023. The film achieved first place on VOD charts, topping iTunes, Google Play, and Vudu. Dial of Destiny was released on Disney+ on December 1, 2023, and was released on DVD, Blu-ray, and 4K by Walt Disney Studios Home Entertainment four days later. Dial of Destiny was also the final home video releases of the film to be distributed by Buena Vista Home Entertainment before Disney made a licensing home video deal with Sony Pictures Home Entertainment on February 20, 2024 in North America.

The film debuted at No. 1 on iTunes, Google Play, and Vudu following its PVOD release. It was the only newly released title to appear on all three charts. It also debuted at No. 1 on the U.K. home entertainment sales chart, selling 78,000 digital units for the week ending September 6, 2023. The film remained No. 1 on the U.K. home entertainment sales chart for a second consecutive week through September 13, 2023, maintaining its lead over Universal Studios' Fast X (No. 2). Indiana Jones and the Dial of Destiny debuted at No. 1 on both the Circana VideoScan First Alert chart and the Blu-ray Disc sales chart for the week ending December 9, 2023. HD formats accounted for 57% of its first-week sales, with 35% from Blu-ray and 22% from 4K Ultra HD.

Analytics company Samba TV, which gathers viewership data from certain smart TVs and content providers, reported that Indiana Jones and the Dial of Destiny attracted 474,000 viewers within its first six days on video-on-demand. This performance closely followed Guardians of the Galaxy Vol. 3 (482,000 viewers) and surpassed Spider-Man: Across the Spider-Verse (321,000 viewers) in the same timeframe. Nielsen Media Research, which records streaming viewership on certain U.S. television screens, calculated that the film was watched for 498 million minutes from December 4–10, 2023.

== Reception ==
=== Box office ===
Indiana Jones and the Dial of Destiny is the most expensive film in the Indiana Jones franchise, as well as one of the most expensive films ever made. The film grossed $174.5 million in the United States and Canada, and $209.5 million in other territories, for a worldwide total of $384 million. It had a production budget of $294.7 million, but received $55.8 million (£46.2 million) tax credit bringing its net costs down to $238.9 million. Forbes noted that it would need to make a worldwide theatrical gross of $477.8 million for Disney to break even theatrically while Collider estimated the film would need to make around $600 million to break-even at the box office. Some publications considered the film a box-office bomb.

In the United States and Canada, Dial of Destiny was released alongside Ruby Gillman, Teenage Kraken, and was projected to gross domestically $60–65 million from 4,600 theaters in its opening weekend. It was also expected to gross around $80 million from international territories, for a worldwide debut of around $140 million. TheWrap claimed that Americans under the age of 30 had a "much lower presence in ticket presales compared to the average summer tentpole" and that the film's tracking was also underperforming in Asian markets. The film made $24 million on its first day, including $7.2 million from Thursday night previews. It went on to debut to $60.4 million over the three-day weekend, the second-highest total of the franchise (not adjusted for inflation), behind its predecessor Indiana Jones and the Kingdom of the Crystal Skull (2008), and a total of $83.9 million over the five-day Independence Day holiday, finishing first at the box office; Deadline Hollywood noted that a majority of the opening weekend audience (58%) was over the age of 35. The film made $26.5 million in its second weekend, finishing in second behind newcomer Insidious: The Red Door; the 56.1% drop was the largest of the franchise. The film made $12 million in its third weekend and $6.7 million in its fourth, finishing in fourth and fifth place, respectively.

Overseas, the film made $69.6 million from 52 countries in its opening weekend. The largest markets were the United Kingdom ($8.9 million), France ($5.9 million), Japan ($4.7 million), Korea ($4.1 million), Germany ($4.1 million), Spain ($4 million), Australia ($3.8 million), Italy ($2.7 million), China ($2.3 million), and Mexico ($2.3 million).

=== Critical response ===
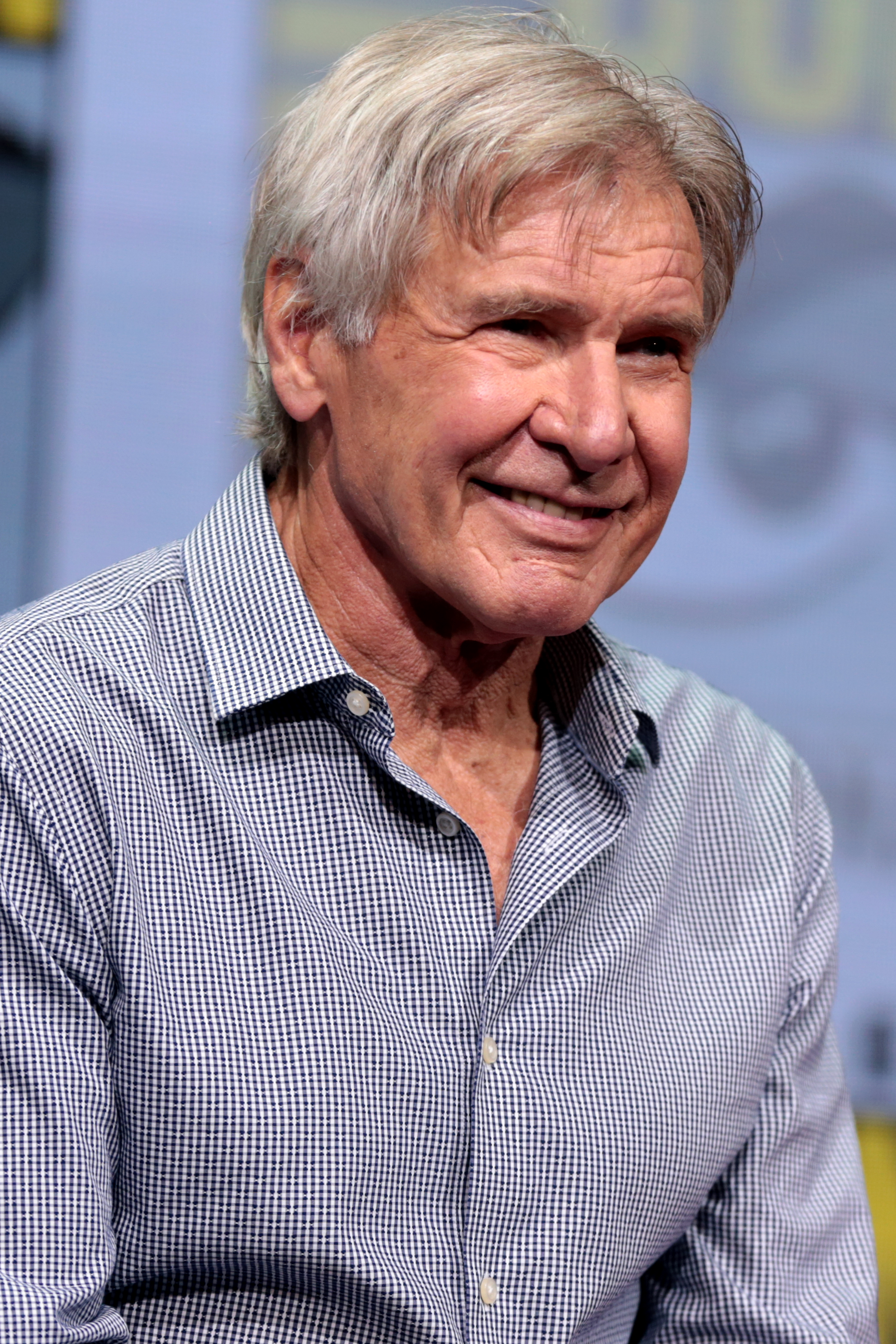
Harrison Ford was praised for his final portrayal as Indiana Jones by critics.

On the review aggregator website Rotten Tomatoes, 71% of 438 critics' reviews are positive, with an average rating of 6.4/10. The website's consensus reads: "It isn't as thrilling as earlier adventures, but the nostalgic rush of seeing Harrison Ford back in action helps Indiana Jones and the Dial of Destiny find a few final bits of cinematic treasure." Metacritic, which uses a weighted average, assigned the film a score of 58 out of 100, based on 65 critics, indicating "mixed or average" reviews. Audiences polled by CinemaScore gave the film an average grade of "B+" on an A+ to F scale, while PostTrak reported a 79% positive score from filmgoers, with 59% saying they would definitely recommend the film.

John Nugent of Empire gave the film four out of five stars, complimenting Ford's performance, and noted Mangold's camerawork "moves confidently through action set-piece after action set-piece, keeping up a frantic pace". Bilge Ebiri, reviewing for Vulture, called the film "fun" but acknowledged comparisons to the previous installments were "warranted. But it's also too entertaining to dismiss. You may not lose yourself in this one the way so many of us once did with the earlier Indiana Jones movies, but you'll certainly have a good time." The Guardian's Peter Bradshaw felt Dial of Destiny "has quite a bit of zip and fun and narrative ingenuity with all its MacGuffiny silliness that the last one really didn't".

Germain Lussier, reviewing the film for io9, praised the film for having "a great premise, exciting action, wonderful banter, and some fantastic twists and turns". In Uproxx, Mike Ryan wrote: "This is a very fun movie but Indy's arc is poignant and also sad. It's kept in the background, but it's there." He found the ending more satisfying than the ending of The Kingdom of the Crystal Skull.

Owen Gleiberman of Variety described the film as a "dutifully eager but ultimately rather joyless piece of nostalgic hokum minus the thrill... Though it has its quota of 'relentless' action, it rarely tries to match (let alone top) the ingeniously staged kinetic bravura of Raiders of the Lost Ark ... time travel, in Indiana Jones and the Dial of Destiny, is really an unconscious metaphor, since it's the movie that wants to go back in time, completing our love affair with the defining action-movie-star role of Harrison Ford. In the abstract, at least, it accomplishes that, right down to the emotional diagram of a touching finale, but only by reminding you that even if you re-stage the action ethos of the past, recapturing the thrill is much harder." David Rooney for The Hollywood Reporter criticized the film, writing "it's a big, bombastic movie that goes through the motions but never finds much joy in the process, despite John Williams's hard-working score continuously pushing our nostalgia buttons and trying to convince us we're on a wild ride."

The Telegraph's Robbie Collin praised Ford's performance, but felt the film's action sequences were "loaded with mayhem but painfully short on spark and bravado: there's no shot here, nor twist of choreography, that makes you marvel at the filmmaking mind that conceived it". Richard Lawson of Vanity Fair wrote: "Dial of Destiny certainly tries hard to do right by its pedigree. The basic component parts are there: an object quest rooted in history, a tingle of the supernatural, easily rooted-against fascist villains. But something in the calculations is off ...In [the film], one can feel the four credited screenwriters grasping at inspiration and coming up short. What they did manage to make would be perfectly fine as a standalone adventure film starring some other character, but it's not worthy of the whip."

=== Responses from cast and crew ===
Shortly after the film's release in June 2023, Allen admitted herself she would have wished to appear more as Ravenwood in the film, but was grateful nonetheless that Mangold and the Butterworths still included her character in the film and asked her to be back. In October 2024, Rhys-Davies expressed his feelings that, despite liking the film as a finale to the franchise, he felt it didn't flesh out its full potential by taking the franchise to full circle, opining that Banderas' talent was wasted on Renaldo and that it should have been his character Sallah and George Harris' Simon Katanga from Raiders who fulfilled Renaldo's role.

In December 2024, while promoting A Complete Unknown (2024), Mangold expressed disappointment to Deadline Hollywood at the poor reception to the film, saying, "You have a wonderful, brilliant actor who's in his eighties. So I'm making a movie about this guy in his eighties, but his audience on one other level doesn't want to confront their hero at that age. And I am like, I'm good with it. We made the movie. But the question is, how would anything have made the audience happy with that, other than having to start over again with a new guy? And then here come lifelong heroes from my childhood into my life going, 'We have something for you to work on'. It was a "joyous experience, but it hurt ... in the sense that I really love Harrison and I wanted audiences to love him as he was and to accept that that's part of what the movie has to say—that things come to an end, that's part of life".

While promoting the Marvel Cinematic Universe (MCU) film Captain America: Brave New World (2025) in February 2025, Ford told The Wall Street Journal that the film's financial disappointment was because "shit happens" and claimed responsibility for its realization, arguing that he was the one who felt that there was still another story to tell with the title character suffering the consequences of the life he chose to have, hence his desire to play him again one last time and expressing his happiness for making the film. One of the film's producers Kathleen Kennedy additionally stated: "I have no regrets about (making the film) because Harrison wanted to do that more than anything. He did not want Indy to end with the fourth movie. He wanted a chance at another, and we did that for him. I think that was the right thing to do. He wanted to do that movie."

=== Accolades ===
The trailer for Indiana Jones and the Dial of Destiny was nominated in three categories at the 2023 Golden Trailer Awards: Best Summer 2023 Blockbuster Trailer, and Best Teaser; and "Hero" (Wild Card) for Best Fantasy Adventure TV Spot (for a Feature Film) and Best Music TV Spot (for a Feature Film). It won Best Fantasy Adventure for "New Day" (Wild Card) and Best Fantasy Adventure TV Spot (for a Feature Film) for "Hero" (Wild Card).

At the 48th Saturn Awards, Dial of Destiny was nominated for nine awards, including Best Fantasy Film, Best Actor (Ford), Best Supporting Actress (Waller-Bridge), Best Supporting Actor (Mikkelsen), Best Director (Mangold), Best Music (Williams), and Best Special Effects and won three.

The film was nominated for two awards at the 22nd Visual Effects Society Awards, Outstanding Visual Effects in a Photoreal Feature and Outstanding Created Environment in a Photoreal Feature.

At the 44th Golden Raspberry Awards, the film was nominated for Worst Prequel, Remake, Rip-off or Sequel (as "Indiana Jones and the Dial of...Still Beating a Dead Horse") and Worst Screenplay (as "Indiana Jones and the Dial of...Can I go home now?"), but both lost to Winnie-the-Pooh: Blood and Honey.

For the 96th Academy Awards, John Williams' score received a Best Original Score nomination, marking his fourth nomination within the series. At age 91, this nomination also extended his record for the most Oscar nominations (54) for any living person. The score was also nominated, alongside Williams' work on The Fabelmans (2022), for Best Score Soundtrack for Visual Media at the 66th Grammy Awards. Williams won a Grammy for Best Instrumental Composition for "Helena's Theme", making it Williams' 26th Grammy Award.

Award	Date of ceremony	Category	Nominee(s)	Result	Ref.
Golden Trailer Awards	June 5, 2023	Best Summer 2023 Blockbuster Trailer	Indiana Jones and the Dial of Destiny	Nominated	
Golden Trailer Awards	June 5, 2023	Best Fantasy Adventure	Indiana Jones and the Dial of Destiny	Won	
Golden Trailer Awards	June 5, 2023	Best Teaser	Indiana Jones and the Dial of Destiny	Nominated	
Golden Trailer Awards	June 5, 2023	Best Fantasy Adventure TV Spot (for a Feature Film)	Indiana Jones and the Dial of Destiny	Won	
Golden Trailer Awards	June 5, 2023	Best Music TV Spot (for a Feature Film)	Indiana Jones and the Dial of Destiny	Won	
AARP Movies for Grownups Awards	January 17, 2024	Best Intergenerational Film	Indiana Jones and the Dial of Destiny	Nominated	
Grammy Awards	February 4, 2024	Best Score Soundtrack for Visual Media	Indiana Jones and the Dial of Destiny – John Williams	Nominated	
Grammy Awards	February 4, 2024	Best Instrumental Composition	"Helena's Theme" – John Williams	Won	
Saturn Awards	February 4, 2024	Best Fantasy Film	Indiana Jones and the Dial of Destiny	Won	
Saturn Awards	February 4, 2024	Best Director in a Film	James Mangold	Nominated	
Saturn Awards	February 4, 2024	Best Actor in a Film	Harrison Ford	Won	
Saturn Awards	February 4, 2024	Best Supporting Actor in a Film	Mads Mikkelsen	Nominated	
Saturn Awards	February 4, 2024	Best Supporting Actress in a Film	Phoebe Waller-Bridge	Nominated	
Saturn Awards	February 4, 2024	Best Film Editing	Andrew Buckland, Michael McCusker, and Dirk Westervelt	Nominated	
Saturn Awards	February 4, 2024	Best Music in a Film	John Williams	Won	
Saturn Awards	February 4, 2024	Best Film Costume Design	Joanna Johnston	Nominated	
Saturn Awards	February 4, 2024	Best Film Special / Visual Effects	Andrew Whitehurst, Kathy Siegel, Robert Weaver, and Alistair Williams	Nominated	
AACTA Awards	February 10, 2024	Best Visual Effects or Animation	Andrew Whitehurst, Kathy Siegel, Alistair Williams, Julian Hutchens, and Ian Cope	Won	
Set Decorators Society of America Awards	February 13, 2024	Best Achievement in Decor/Design of a Science Fiction or Fantasy Feature Film	Sabine Schaaf and Uli Hanisch	Nominated	
Visual Effects Society Awards	February 21, 2024	Outstanding Visual Effects in a Photoreal feature	Andrew Whitehurst, Kathy Siegel, Robert Weaver, Julian Hutchens, and Alistair Williams	Nominated	
Visual Effects Society Awards	February 21, 2024	Outstanding Created Environment in a Photoreal Feature	Johan Gabrielsson, Adrian Tsang, Stefan Andersson, and Martin Eneroth (underwater wreck environment)	Nominated	
Screen Actors Guild Awards	February 24, 2024	Outstanding Performance by a Stunt Ensemble in a Motion Picture	Indiana Jones and the Dial of Destiny	Nominated	
Golden Raspberry Awards	March 9, 2024	Worst Remake, Rip-Off or Sequel	Indiana Jones and the Dial of...Still Beating a Dead Horse	Nominated	
Golden Raspberry Awards	March 9, 2024	Worst Screenplay	Indiana Jones and the Dial of...Can I go home now?	Nominated	
Academy Awards	March 10, 2024	Best Original Score	John Williams	Nominated	

== Future ==
Disney CEO Bob Iger said in 2016 that the future of the franchise with Ford was unknown, but that the fifth film would not be the final installment in the franchise. In 2022, Kennedy reaffirmed earlier comments that Ford's role as Indiana Jones would not be recast, while Ford confirmed that the fifth film would be his last in the series. That November, Disney considered multiple options to continue the franchise, including additional films or a television series for Disney+. By March 2023, Lucasfilm was reported to have canceled Indiana Jones movies and television series because they wanted to focus on the Star Wars franchise; it would have been the second prequel series following The Young Indiana Jones Chronicles. Disney confirmed the following month that the film would indeed be the last in the franchise.

== See also ==
- Apollo 11 in popular culture

== Works cited ==
- This article is partially from the site of Indiana Jones Wiki, the text has been placed by the author or person responsible for publication under the Creative Commons Attribution-ShareAlike License or a compatible license. (See the list of authors.)
