= Jez Butterworth =

British playwright, screenwriter and film director

Jez Butterworth FRSL
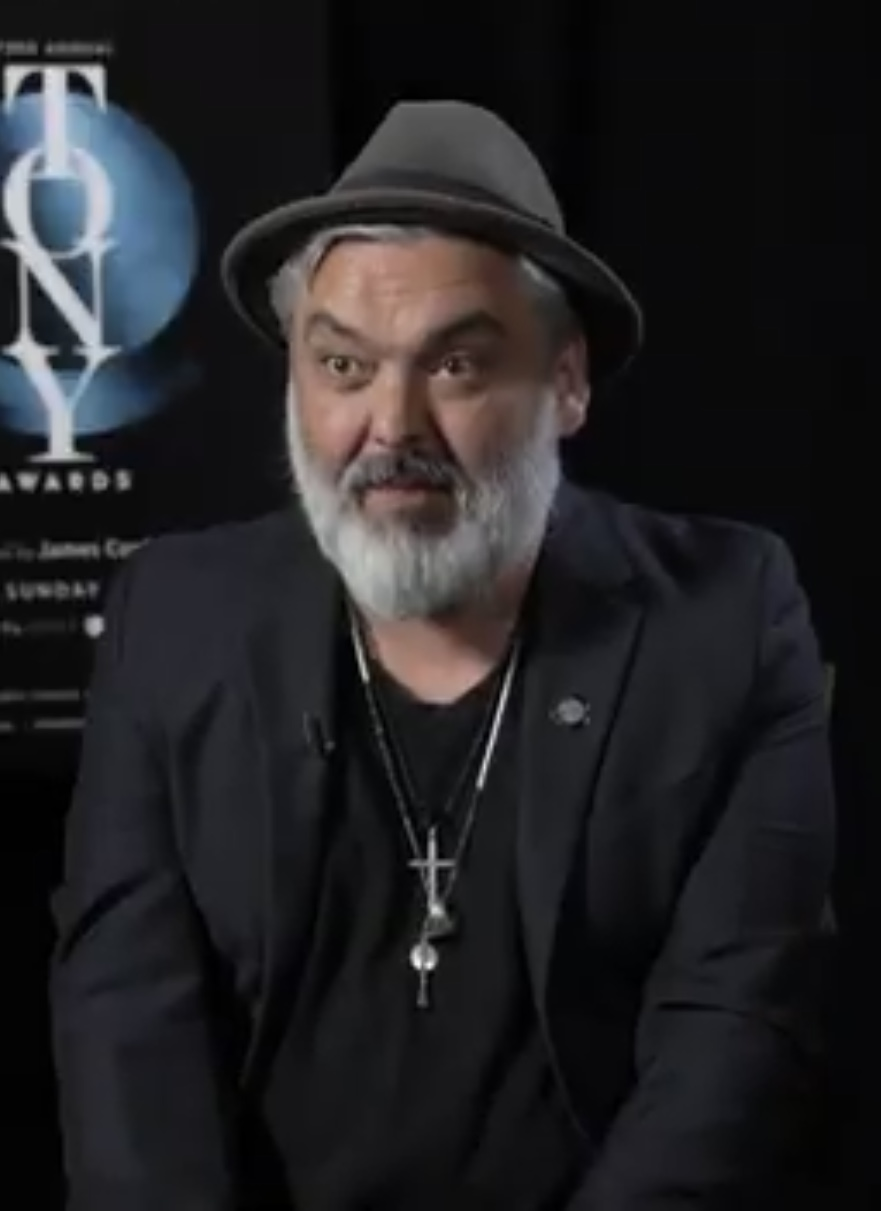
- Butterworth in 2019
- Born: Jeremy Butterworth; 4 March 1969 (age 57); London, England
- Education: St John's College, Cambridge
- Occupations: Playwright; screenwriter; film director
- Partner: Laura Donnelly
- Relatives: John-Henry Butterworth (brother)
- Writing career
- Notable works: Mojo (1995); Mojo (adapted for screen) (1997); Birthday Girl (2001); The Night Heron (2002); Parlour Song (2008); Jerusalem (2009); The Ferryman (2017)

Jeremy "Jez" Butterworth (born 4 March 1969) is an English playwright, screenwriter, and film director. He has gained recognition for his unique voice in contemporary theatre, often blending themes of myth, folklore, and realism. He has received a Tony Award and two Laurence Olivier Awards.

Butterworth started his career with his play Mojo (1995), a comedic dark crime drama which earned the Laurence Olivier Award for Best New Comedy. He found acclaim with his play Jerusalem, which has been described as "the greatest British play of the 21st century". He wrote the play The Ferryman (2017), about a former IRA volunteer set in The Troubles, which won both the Laurence Olivier Award for Best New Play and the Tony Award for Best Play. His latest play, The Hills of California (2024), debuted in London and made its Broadway transfer in the same year.

Butterworth made his directorial film debut with Mojo (1997), based on his own play of the same name. He has since written the screenplays for films such as the erotic thriller Birthday Girl (2001), the political drama Fair Game (2010), the science-fiction action film Edge of Tomorrow (2014), the James Brown biopic Get On Up (2014), the Whitey Bulger crime drama Black Mass (2015), and the sports drama Ford v Ferrari (2019). He has also co-written screenplays for the James Bond film Spectre (2015) and the Indiana Jones franchise film Indiana Jones and the Dial of Destiny (2023).

== Early life ==
Butterworth was born in London, England, on 4 March 1969. He has three brothers: older brothers Tom (born 1966) and Steve (born 1968), and younger brother John-Henry (born 1976). He also has a sister, Joanna. He attended Verulam Comprehensive School, St Albans, and St John's College, Cambridge, where he studied the English tripos and graduated in 1991. All his brothers have been active in film and theatre; Steve is a producer, while Tom and John-Henry are writers.

== Career ==
=== 1995–2008: Early work ===
Butterworth's play Mojo, which premiered at the Royal Court Theatre in 1995, won the 1996 Laurence Olivier, Evening Standard, The Writer's Guild, and the George Devine awards, and the Critic's Circle Award. Butterworth also wrote and directed the film adaptation of Mojo (1997). The film featured Harold Pinter.

In 1999, Butterworth was one of the recipients of the V Europe Prize Theatrical Realities awarded to the Royal Court Theatre (with Sarah Kane, Mark Ravenhill, Conor McPherson, Martin McDonagh). Butterworth co-wrote and directed the film Birthday Girl (2001), which was produced by his brother Steve and starred Nicole Kidman.

Butterworth received positive reviews of his play The Night Heron (2002), which premiered in the West End at the Royal Court Theatre. The Guardian reviewer wrote: "Can a play be simultaneously very good and very bad? I believe so". The Winterling also ran at the Royal Court in 2006. The British Theatre Guide wrote: "The Winterling can be a difficult play but contains rich veins of comedy". His play Parlour Song opened in New York to "rave reviews" at the Atlantic Theatre Company, Off-Broadway in March 2008. The play then played at the Almeida Theatre, with Michael Billington of The Guardian writing: "After the more erratic The Night Heron and The Winterling, Butterworth shows that he has a compassionate understanding of the quiet desperation that stalks Britain's new estates. He exactly captures the mundane madness beneath the bland routine of affluence".

=== 2008–2016: Breakthrough with Jerusalem ===
Butterworth's fourth play for the Royal Court Theatre was Jerusalem, which premiered in July 2009 to positive reviews. Described as a "contemporary vision of life in [England's] green and pleasant land", Jerusalem was the second important Butterworth production in London in 2009. The production starred Mark Rylance as Johnny Byron, and featured Mackenzie Crook as Ginger in a supporting role. It was a sell-out at the Royal Court, won the Evening Standard Theatre Award and Critics' Circle Theatre Award for the best play of 2009 and, with the same cast, transferred to the Apollo Theatre on Shaftesbury Avenue in January 2010.

Jerusalem opened on Broadway in April 2011, with many of the original UK cast. It returned to London later that year, again playing at the Apollo. In January 2014 Jerusalem opened at the San Francisco Playhouse, where it also received rave reviews. Jerusalem was nominated for the 2011 Tony Award, Play. Mark Rylance won the 2011 Tony Award for Best Performance by an Actor in a Play. Jez and John-Henry Butterworth were named recipients of the Writers Guild of America West's 2011 Paul Selvin Award for their screenplay for the film Fair Game (2010), directed by Doug Liman and starring Naomi Watts and Sean Penn.

On 26 October 2012, Butterworth's play The River opened at the Royal Court Theatre, starring Dominic West, Laura Donnelly, and Miranda Raison, with an appearance by Gillian Saker. The River had its US premiere on Broadway at the Circle in the Square Theatre in a limited engagement in October 2014, starring Hugh Jackman and directed by Ian Rickson. Reception was positive, with London critics finding the work "lyrical", "beautifully written" and "suffuse[d] with wonder and beauty".

=== 2017–2019: The Ferryman and acclaim ===
Butterworth's play The Ferryman opened at the Royal Court Theatre in April 2017. Directed by Sam Mendes, it became the fastest-selling play in the Royal Court Theatre's history. Set in rural South Armagh in 1981 and focusing on the events surrounding the deaths of the IRA hunger strikers, it received 15 five-star reviews, including all the major UK papers. The Irish Times said: "Although Butterworth is English, The Ferryman feels like a thoroughly Irish play, not only because there is not a single false note in the dialogue". The Huffington Post said that it was "one of the two or three greatest plays of the decade". But The Guardian's Sean O'Hagan wrote: "I'm from Northern Ireland and it doesn't ring true", and that it was "so close to a cultural stereotype as to be offensive". Two weeks later, The Irish Times printed an opinion piece by actor Gerard Lee (of Father Ted) entitled "In defence of The Ferryman". He challenged negative comments, calling the play "layered and powerful".

The Ferryman won the 2017 Evening Standard Award for Best Play, the 2018 Critics' Circle Award for Best New Play, the 2018 WhatsOnStage Award for Best New Play, and the 2018 Olivier Award for Best New Play. It has played for over 350 performances at the Gielgud Theatre and transferred to Broadway in October 2018. The play won the 2019 Drama Desk Award for Outstanding Play and Tony Award for Best Play. In 2019, he wrote the screenplay for the sports drama Ford v. Ferrari directed by James Mangold starring Christian Bale and Matt Damon. The film received positive reviews.

=== 2020–present ===
In 2023, he wrote the fifth instalment of the Indiana Jones franchise, Indiana Jones and the Dial of Destiny reunited with director James Mangold. The film was not a commercial success and received mixed reviews. David Rooney of The Hollywood Reporter wrote: "This is a big, bombastic movie that goes through the motions but never finds much joy in the process", adding that the screenplay "feel[s] of something written by committee".

== Influences ==
Butterworth has said that Harold Pinter has been a major influence on his work: "I know and admire Harold Pinter enormously. He has a ginormous influence on me. Conversations with him have inspired my work".

== Theatre credits ==
Year	Title	Notes	Ref.
1995	Mojo	Royal Court Theatre	
2002	The Night Heron	Royal Court Theatre, West End	
2003	The Night Heron	Atlantic Theater Company, Off-Broadway	
2006	The Winterling	Royal Court Theatre, West End	
2008	Parlour Song	Atlantic Theatre Company, Off-Broadway	
2009	Parlour Song	Almeida Theatre, West End	
2009	Jerusalem	Royal Court Theatre, West End	
2011	Jerusalem	Music Box Theater, Broadway	
2012	The River	Royal Court Theatre, West End	
2014	The River	Circle in the Square Theatre, Broadway	
2017	The Ferryman	Royal Court Theatre, West End	
2018	The Ferryman	Bernard B. Jacobs Theatre, Broadway	
2024	The Hills of California	Harold Pinter Theatre, West End	
2024	The Hills of California	Broadhurst Theatre, Broadway	

== Filmography ==
=== Film ===
Year	Title	Director	Notes
1997	Mojo	Himself	
2001	Birthday Girl	Himself	
2007	The Last Legion	Doug Lefler	
2010	Fair Game	Doug Liman	
2014	Edge of Tomorrow	Doug Liman	
2014	Get On Up	Tate Taylor	
2015	Black Mass	Scott Cooper	
2015	Spectre	Sam Mendes	
2019	Ford v Ferrari	James Mangold	
2021	Flag Day	Sean Penn	
2023	Indiana Jones and the Dial of Destiny	James Mangold	
2026	Digger	Alejandro G. Iñárritu	Story by
2028	The Beatles — A Four-Film Cinematic Event † (Note: Including Untitled Paul McCartney film, Untitled John Lennon film, Untitled George Harrison film and Untitled Ringo Starr film)	Sam Mendes	

Other writing contributions

- Lucy In The Sky (2019) (script doctoring)
- Cruella (2021) (script doctoring)
- Snow White (2025) (additional literary material)
- F1 (2025) (additional literary material)
- Tron: Ares (2025) (additional literary material)

=== Television ===
Year	Title	Notes	Ref.
1993	Night of the Golden Brain	Television movie	
1996	Christmas	Television movie	
2017–21	Britannia	26 episodes	
2019	The Monologue Project	Episode: "Mojo"	
2022	Mammals	6 episodes	
2024–present	The Agency	20 episodes	
2025–present	MobLand	20 episodes	

== Awards and nominations ==
In July 2017, Butterworth revealed he had declined the offer of appointment as Officer of the Order of the British Empire (OBE) due to the Conservative government's pledge to hold a referendum on Britain's membership of the European Union. He was elected a Fellow of the Royal Society of Literature in 2019.

Year	Award	Category	Work	Result	Ref.
1995	Evening Standard Theatre Award	Most Promising Playwright	Mojo	Won	
1996	Laurence Olivier Award	Best New Comedy	Mojo	Won	
1999	Europe Theatre Prize	Europe Prize Theatrical Realities		Won	
2010	Laurence Olivier Award	Best New Play	Jerusalem	Nominated	
2011	Tony Award	Best Play	Jerusalem	Nominated	
2011	New York Drama Critics' Circle Award	Best Foreign Play	Jerusalem	Won	
2017	Critics' Circle Theatre Award	Best New Play	The Ferryman	Won	
2018	Laurence Olivier Award	Best New Play	The Ferryman	Won	
2019	Tony Award	Best Play	The Ferryman	Won	
2019	New York Drama Critics' Circle Award	Best Play	The Ferryman	Won	
2024	Laurence Olivier Award	Best New Play	The Hills of California	Nominated	
2025	Tony Award	Best Play	The Hills of California	Nominated	
2025	Outer Critics Circle Awards	Outstanding Broadway Play	The Hills of California	Nominated	
2025	Dorian Awards	Outstanding Broadway Play	The Hills of California	Nominated	
