= Ford v Ferrari =

2019 film by James Mangold

- Theatrical release poster
- Directed by: James Mangold
- Written by: Jez Butterworth; John-Henry Butterworth; Jason Keller
- Produced by: Peter Chernin; Jenno Topping; James Mangold
- Starring: Matt Damon; Christian Bale; Jon Bernthal; Caitríona Balfe; Tracy Letts; Josh Lucas
- Cinematography: Phedon Papamichael
- Edited by: Michael McCusker; Andrew Buckland
- Music by: Marco Beltrami; Buck Sanders
- Production companies: Chernin Entertainment; Turnpike Films
- Distributed by: 20th Century Fox
- Release dates: August 30, 2019 (Telluride); November 15, 2019 (United States)
- Running time: 152 minutes
- Country: United States
- Language: English
- Budget: $97.6 million
- Box office: $226.3 million

Ford v Ferrari (titled Le Mans '66 in some European countries) is a 2019 American biographical sports drama film directed by James Mangold and written by Jez Butterworth, John-Henry Butterworth, and Jason Keller. It stars Matt Damon and Christian Bale, with Jon Bernthal, Caitríona Balfe, Tracy Letts, Josh Lucas, Noah Jupe, Remo Girone, and Ray McKinnon in supporting roles. The plot follows a determined team of American and English engineers and designers, led by automotive designer Carroll Shelby and his English driver, Ken Miles, who are hired by Henry Ford II and Lee Iacocca to build a race car to defeat the perennially dominant Italian racing team Scuderia Ferrari at the 1966 24 Hours of Le Mans race in France.

Ford v Ferrari had its world premiere at the Telluride Film Festival on August 30, 2019, and was theatrically released in the United States on November 15, 2019, by 20th Century Fox to critical and commercial success; critics praised the performances (particularly Bale and Damon), Mangold's direction, the editing, the sound design and the racing sequences, and it was chosen by the National Board of Review as one of the ten best films of the year. At the 92nd Academy Awards, the film received four nominations, including Best Picture, and won Best Film Editing and Best Sound Editing. Bale also received nominations for the Golden Globe Award for Best Actor – Drama and the Screen Actors Guild Award for Outstanding Performance by a Male Actor in a Leading Role.

== Plot ==
In 1963, Ford Motor Company vice president Lee Iacocca proposes to Henry Ford II to boost their car sales by purchasing Ferrari, who are dominant in the annual 24 Hours of Le Mans. Owner Enzo Ferrari uses Ford's offer to secure a deal with Fiat that allows him to retain ownership of the firm's racing team, Scuderia Ferrari, and insults Ford and his whole company. This leads Ford into ordering his racing division to build a car to compete against Ferrari at Le Mans and Iacocca hiring Shelby American owner Carroll Shelby, a retired driver who won Le Mans in 1959. Shelby enlists his friend Ken Miles, a hot-tempered English racing driver, automotive engineer and mechanic.

Shelby and Miles develop the UK-built Ford GT40 Mk I prototype at Los Angeles International Airport while the latter gives advice on how to enhance the car's performance. At the launch of the new Ford Mustang, Miles gives a witheringly rude appraisal of it to Ford senior vice president Leo Beebe. Beebe campaigns against sending Miles to the upcoming race at Le Mans as a public relations liability. Shelby reluctantly excludes Miles and sends Phil Hill and Bruce McLaren to Le Mans; none of the Fords finish. Miles, who is listening on radio, realizes that he was right on all the car's flaws.

When Ford demands why he should not sack Shelby, Shelby explains that despite the GT40's reliability problems, it instilled fear in Enzo Ferrari by reaching 218 mph (350.8 km/h) on the Mulsanne Straight before breaking down. He says a race car cannot be designed by committee. Ford tells him to continue the project and report directly to him. During testing of the GT40 Mk II, the recurrent problem of brake fade causes a crash and fire, which Miles survives. The team realizes the rules permit replacing the whole brake assembly during the race.

In 1966, Beebe takes over the racing division. When he and Ford arrive to inspect the program, Shelby locks Beebe in his office and gives Ford a ride in the GT40. Shelby makes an agreement with Ford: if Miles wins the 24 Hours of Daytona, then he will race at Le Mans. If not, Ford will take full ownership of Shelby American. At Daytona International Speedway, Beebe enters a second GT40 supported by a NASCAR team with quicker pit stops. However, Shelby clears Miles to push his car beyond the 7,000 RPM redline, and he wins.

At the next race at Le Mans, Miles struggles with a faulty door during the first lap. The pit crew fixes it, and Miles sets lap records, catching the Ferraris. The GT40 suffers brake fade while dicing with the prototype 330 P3 Ferrari of Lorenzo Bandini, so Miles limps into the pits for replacement of the entire braking system. Ferrari protests, but Shelby assures race officials it is legal.

Miles and Bandini duel on the Mulsanne Straight until the Ferrari breaks down, putting Bandini out of the race. With Fords in the top three positions, Beebe orders Shelby to have Miles slow down for the other Fords to catch him and give the press a three-car photo finish. Shelby tells Miles what Beebe wants but says it is Miles's call. Miles initially continues to set new lap records but decides to comply on the final lap.

McLaren is declared the winner as, having started behind Miles, his car traveled farther overall. Miles is placed second. Shelby accuses Beebe of deliberately costing Miles the win, but an unusually sanguine Miles lets it pass, saying to Shelby, "You promised me the drive, not the win." From his vantage point, Enzo Ferrari tips his hat to Miles on the track. As they walk off together, Shelby tells Miles they will win Le Mans next time.

Two months later, Miles is killed in a crash while testing the J-car at Riverside International Raceway. Six months later, Shelby parks outside Miles's widow Mollie's house and hesitates. Miles's son Peter arrives, and the two talk about Miles. Shelby gives Peter a wrench that Miles once threw at him in anger.

A textual epilogue reveals that Ford continued its Le Mans winning streak in 1967, 1968, and 1969, and Miles was posthumously inducted into the Motorsports Hall of Fame of America in 2001.

== Cast ==
- Matt Damon as Carroll Shelby, American former race car driver, automotive designer, and builder
- Christian Bale as Ken Miles, English race car driver
- Jon Bernthal as Lee Iacocca, vice president of Ford
- Caitríona Balfe as Mollie Miles, Miles' wife
- Tracy Letts as Henry Ford II, CEO of Ford
- Josh Lucas as Leo Beebe, senior executive vice president of Ford
- Noah Jupe as Peter Miles, Miles' son
- Remo Girone as Enzo Ferrari, founder of Ferrari
- Ray McKinnon as Phil Remington
- JJ Feild as Roy Lunn
- Jack McMullen as Charlie Agapiou
- Corrado Invernizzi as Franco Gozzi
- Tanner Foust as Ronnie Bucknum
- Brent Pontin as Chris Amon
- Benjamin Rigby as Bruce McLaren
- Francesco Bauco as Lorenzo Bandini
- Joe Williamson as Donald N. Frey
- Ian Harding as Ford Executive – Ian
- Christopher Darga as John Holman
- Jonathan LaPaglia as Eddie
- Ben Collins as Denny Hulme
- Alex Gurney as Dan Gurney
- Marisa Petroro as Cristina Ford
- Giovanni Cirfiera as Gianni Agnelli

== Production ==
=== Development ===
A film based on the rivalry between Ford and Ferrari for the dominance at the Le Mans endurance race had long been in works at 20th Century Fox. Initially, it was going to star Tom Cruise and Brad Pitt from an original screenplay titled Go Like Hell, by Jason Keller, the name being taken from the book, Go Like Hell: Ford, Ferrari, and Their Battle for Speed and Glory at Le Mans by A. J. Baime. However, after writers Jez Butterworth and John-Henry Butterworth drafted a script and Joseph Kosinski was brought on to direct, the project fell apart due to the budget being too high. Cruise also left the project as he wouldn't be driving that much in the film.

On February 5, 2018, it was announced that James Mangold had been brought on board to direct the film based on the previous script by Keller and the Butterworths. Later, Caitríona Balfe, Jon Bernthal, and Noah Jupe joined the cast alongside Christian Bale and Matt Damon in the lead roles.

In July 2018, Jack McMullen was cast in the film to play one of Miles's key British mechanics, and Tracy Letts also joined to play Henry Ford II, along with Joe Williamson. In August 2018, JJ Feild was cast in the film to play the automotive engineer Roy Lunn, the head of Ford Advanced Vehicle Operations in England and the right-hand man to Henry Ford II. Mangold approached Harrison Ford for a part in the film; they would later collaborate in The Call of the Wild and Indiana Jones and the Dial of Destiny.

Composer Marco Beltrami confirmed in an interview that he would be scoring the film, Beltrami having previously worked with Mangold on 3:10 to Yuma, The Wolverine and Logan.

=== Filming ===
Filming began on July 30, 2018, and lasted for 67 days, taking place in California; New Orleans, Louisiana; Atlanta; Savannah; and Statesboro, Georgia, as well as Le Mans, France.

Race scenes that appear in the film as Daytona were filmed at Auto Club Speedway in Fontana; many other race scenes were filmed at a Honda test track in Mojave Valley, on the Big Willow road course at Willow Springs International Raceway in Rosamond, Road Atlanta, Grand Prize of America Ave Savannah Hutchinson Island, and at the Porsche Experience in Carson (for the Dearborn test track).

A few scenes were filmed at tracks and roadways in Georgia such as Hwy 46 in Statesboro, Georgia. The Le Mans grandstands, pits, and garages were replicated at the Agua Dulce Airpark in Agua Dulce. The hangar area where the cars were developed (originally at LAX) was filmed at Ontario International Airport in Ontario, California.

== Release ==
Ford v Ferrari premiered at the Telluride Film Festival on August 30, 2019, and screened at the Toronto International Film Festival on September 9, 2019. It was subsequently released in the United States on November 15. It was previously scheduled to be released on June 28.

The first trailer for the film debuted on June 2, 2019, during Game 2 of the 2019 NBA Finals.

=== Home media ===
The film was released on digital format by 20th Century Fox Home Entertainment on January 28, 2020, and on 4K Ultra HD Blu-ray and DVD on February 11, 2020.

== Reception ==
=== Box office ===
Ford v Ferrari grossed $117.6 million in the United States and Canada, and $108.7 million in other territories, for a worldwide total of $226.3 million.

In the United States and Canada, the film was released alongside Charlie's Angels and The Good Liar, and was projected to gross $23–30 million from 3,528 theaters in its opening weekend. It made $10.9 million on its first day, including $2.1 million from Thursday night previews. Its total debut weekend earnings were $31.5 million, topping the box office. In its second weekend the film dropped 50% to $15.7 million, finishing second behind newcomer Frozen 2, and then made $13.2 million in its third weekend (including $19 million over the five-day Thanksgiving frame), finishing third. It continued to hold well in the following weeks, making $6.7 million and $4.1 million in its fourth and fifth weekends.

=== Critical response ===
On review aggregation website Rotten Tomatoes, the film holds an approval rating of 92% based on 364 reviews, with an average rating of 7.80/10. The website's critics consensus reads, "Ford v Ferrari delivers all the polished auto action audiences will expect – and balances it with enough gripping human drama to satisfy non-racing enthusiasts." Metacritic assigned the film a weighted average score of 81 out of 100, based on 47 critics, indicating "universal acclaim". Audiences polled by CinemaScore gave the film a rare grade of "A+," while those at PostTrak gave it an overall positive score of 87% (with an average 4.5 out of 5 stars), with 68% saying they would definitely recommend it.

Mick LaSalle of San Francisco Chronicle gave the film four out of four stars, saying that it "is what it promises to be, a blast from the past" and writing: "Ford v Ferrari could have just been a sports story, dramatizing an interesting chapter in racing, and it would have been fine. But in showing Ford and his minions' constant interference in the dedicated work of Miles and Shelby, this James Mangold film becomes a tale of souls battling the soulless."

Eric Kohn of IndieWire gave the film a "B", saying that "Ford v Ferrari excels at evoking the sheer thrill of the race—'a body moving through space and time', as one character says—and it's compelling enough in those moments to make the case that nothing beats the thrill of competition."

Variety's Peter DeBruge praised the racing sequences and the performances of Bale and Damon, writing: "The best sports movies aren't so much about the sport as they are the personalities, and these two go big with their performances."

In 2025, The Hollywood Reporter listed Ford v Ferrari as having the best stunts of 2019.

=== Ford family response ===
Edsel Ford II, Henry Ford II's son and a former director of Ford, was not pleased with the portrayal of his father. In response to the trailer for the film he commented "Based on this trailer, I think I might miss opening night! I knew Henry Ford II and Tracey Letts is no Henry Ford II."

=== Accolades ===
Accolades received by Ford v Ferrari
Award	Date of ceremony	Category	Recipient(s)	Result	Ref.
AACTA Awards	November 30, 2020	Best Visual Effects or Animation	Olivier Dumont, Kathy Siegel, Malte Sarnes, Mark Byers, and Matt Grieg	Nominated	
AACTA International Awards	January 3, 2020	Best International Actor	Christian Bale	Nominated	
AARP's Movies for Grownups Awards	January 19, 2020	Best Buddy Picture	Ford v Ferrari	Nominated	
Academy Awards	February 9, 2020	Best Picture	Peter Chernin, Jenno Topping, James Mangold	Nominated	
Academy Awards	February 9, 2020	Best Film Editing	Michael McCusker, Andrew Buckland	Won	
Academy Awards	February 9, 2020	Best Sound Editing	Donald Sylvester	Won	
Academy Awards	February 9, 2020	Best Sound Mixing	Paul Massey, David Giammarco and Steven A. Morrow	Nominated	
ACE Eddie Awards	January 17, 2019	Best Edited Feature Film (Drama)	Andrew Buckland and Michael McCusker	Nominated	
Art Directors Guild Awards	February 1, 2020	Excellence in Production Design (Period Film)	François Audouy	Nominated	
American Society of Cinematographers	January 25, 2019	Best Cinematography (Theatrical)	Phedon Papamichael	Nominated	
British Academy Film Awards	February 2, 2020	Best Cinematography	Phedon Papamichael	Nominated	
British Academy Film Awards	February 2, 2020	Best Editing	Michael McCusker and Andrew Buckland	Won	
British Academy Film Awards	February 2, 2020	Best Sound	David Giammarco, Paul Massey, Steven A. Morrow and Donald Sylvester	Nominated	
Cinema Audio Society Awards	January 25, 2020	Sound Mixing for a Motion Picture – Live Action	Ford v Ferrari	Won	
Critics' Choice Movie Awards	January 12, 2020	Best Picture	Ford v Ferrari	Nominated	
Critics' Choice Movie Awards	January 12, 2020	Best Action Movie	Ford v Ferrari	Nominated	
Critics' Choice Movie Awards	January 12, 2020	Best Visual Effects	Ford v Ferrari	Nominated	
Critics' Choice Movie Awards	January 12, 2020	Best Editing	Andrew Buckland and Michael McCusker	Nominated	
Critics' Choice Movie Awards	January 12, 2020	Best Cinematography	Phedon Papamichael	Nominated	
Camerimage	November 16, 2019	Golden Frog	Phedon Papamichael (cinematographer), James Mangold (director)	Nominated	
Golden Globe Awards	January 5, 2020	Best Actor – Motion Picture Drama	Christian Bale	Nominated	
Golden Reel Awards	January 19, 2020	Outstanding Achievement in Sound Editing – Dialogue and ADR	Donald Sylvester and Polly McKinnon	Nominated	
Golden Reel Awards	January 19, 2020	Outstanding Achievement in Sound Editing – Effects and Foley	Donald Sylvester, Jay Wilkenson, David Giammarco, Eric Norris and Anna MacKenzie	Won	
Golden Trailer Awards	July 22, 2021	Best Drama TV Spot (for a Feature Film)	"Run Free" (Lindeman & Associates)	Nominated	
Golden Trailer Awards	July 22, 2021	Best Home Ent Drama	"Awards :30" (Aspect Ratio)	Nominated	
Golden Trailer Awards	July 22, 2021	Best Home Ent Drama	"Target Wall" (Aspect Ratio)	Nominated	
Golden Trailer Awards	July 22, 2021	Best BTS/EPK for a Feature Film (Under 2 Minutes)	"Underdog" (Big Picture)	Nominated	
Hollywood Critics Association Awards	January 9, 2020	Best Editing	Michael McCusker	Nominated	
Hollywood Film Awards	November 3, 2019	Hollywood Director Award	James Mangold	Won	
Hollywood Film Awards	November 3, 2019	Hollywood Editor Award	Michael McCusker and Andrew Buckland	Won	
Hollywood Film Awards	November 3, 2019	Hollywood Sound Award	Donald Sylvester, Paul Massey, David Giammarco and Steven A. Morrow	Won	
Hollywood Music in Media Awards	November 19, 2019	Original Score – Feature Film	Marco Beltrami and Buck Sanders (tied with Hildur Guðnadóttir for Joker)	Won	
Movieguide Awards	January 24, 2020	Best Movie for Mature Audiences	Ford v Ferrari	Nominated	
Producers Guild of America Award	January 18, 2020	Best Theatrical Motion Picture	Peter Chernin, Jenno Topping and James Mangold	Nominated	
San Diego Film Critics Society	December 9, 2019	Best Actor	Christian Bale	Nominated	
San Diego Film Critics Society	December 9, 2019	Best Editing	Andrew Buckland and Michael McCusker	Won	
San Diego Film Critics Society	December 9, 2019	Best Cinematography	Phedon Papamichael	Nominated	
San Francisco Bay Area Film Critics Circle	December 16, 2019	Best Editing	Andrew Buckland and Michael McCusker	Won	
Satellite Awards	December 19, 2019	Best Motion Picture – Drama	Ford v Ferrari	Won	
Satellite Awards	December 19, 2019	Best Director	James Mangold	Won	
Satellite Awards	December 19, 2019	Best Actor – Motion Picture Drama	Christian Bale	Won	
Satellite Awards	December 19, 2019	Best Original Screenplay	Jez Butterworth, John-Henry Butterworth and Jason Keller	Nominated	
Satellite Awards	December 19, 2019	Best Original Score	Marco Beltrami and Buck Sanders	Nominated	
Satellite Awards	December 19, 2019	Best Cinematography	Phedon Papamichael	Nominated	
Satellite Awards	December 19, 2019	Best Visual Effects	Olivier Dumont, Mark Byers and Kathy Segal	Nominated	
Satellite Awards	December 19, 2019	Best Editing	Michael McCusker and Andrew Buckland	Won	
Satellite Awards	December 19, 2019	Best Sound	Donald Sylvester, Paul Massey, David Giammarco and Steven A. Morrow	Won	
Satellite Awards	December 19, 2019	Best Art Direction and Production Design	François Audouy and Peter Lando	Nominated	
Screen Actors Guild Award	January 19, 2020	Outstanding Performance by a Male Actor in a Leading Role	Christian Bale	Nominated	
Screen Actors Guild Award	January 19, 2020	Outstanding Performance by a Stunt Ensemble in a Motion Picture	Ford v Ferrari	Nominated	
Seattle Film Critics Society	December 16, 2019	Best Picture of the Year	Ford v Ferrari	Nominated	
Seattle Film Critics Society	December 16, 2019	Best action choreography	Ford v Ferrari	Nominated	
Visual Effects Society Awards	January 29, 2020	Outstanding Supporting Visual Effects in a Photoreal Feature	Olivier Dumont, Kathy Siegel, Dave Morley, Malte Sarnes, Mark Byers	Nominated	
Washington D.C. Area Film Critics Association	December 8, 2019	Best Editing	Andrew Buckland and Michael McCusker	Won	
