= Mojo (play) =

1995 play by Jez Butterworth

- Original language: English
- Written by: Jez Butterworth
- Genre: Black comedy

Premiere
- Date: 14 July 1995
- Place: Jerwood Theatre Downstairs, Royal Court Theatre; London

Mojo is a 1995 play, then a 1997 feature film, written by English playwright Jez Butterworth, that premiered at the Royal Court Theatre in London, directed by Ian Rickson.

It is a black comedy set in Soho, a fast-paced gangster plot that tells the story of a particular nightclub's culture. Would-be rock 'n' roll star 'Silver Johnny' is on the road to fame and fortune during the summer of 1958 but encounters problems with his jealous manager Ezra, The owner of the Atlantic Club who is hell-bent on protecting him from the amorous advances of creepy local gangster/entrepreneur Sam Ross. Skinny, a member of Johnny's group and one of the club's pill-popping employees discovers Ezra sawn in half in separate dustbins and Ezra's ambitious associate Mickey announces that Ross intends to take over the Atlantic Club.

The original cast was Hans Matheson (Silver Johnny), Tom Hollander (Baby), Aidan Gillen (Skinny), Matt Bardock (Sweets), David Westhead (Mickey) and Andy Serkis (Potts).

In 2013, the play was revived at the Harold Pinter Theatre in London's West End, again directed by Ian Rickson. The cast included Colin Morgan as Skinny, Rupert Grint, making his stage debut as Sweets, Ben Whishaw as Baby, Daniel Mays as Potts, Brendan Coyle as Mickey and Tom Rhys Harries as Silver Johnny.

== Plot ==
Set entirely within the seedy Atlantic club, Silver Johnny - a young and talented performer on the road to fame and fortune - is held back by his jealous and protective manager Ezra, owner of the nightclub and father to a psychotic unloved son, Baby. As Silver Johnny progresses up the ladder to stardom, local gangster/entrepreneur Sam Ross begins to take an interest, and the only way to remove his opposition (Ezra) appears to be sawing him in half, kidnapping Silver Johnny and leaving the club's fate in a state of limbo.

Ezra is discovered the next morning by his second-in-command, the highly ambitious Mickey, who announces that Ross intends to take over the Atlantic Club setting the stage for a major power struggle; "He's been fucking cut in half. He's in two bins."

Terrified by the potential threat of extermination by Ross and his gang, associates of the now deceased Ezra, (Potts, Sweets, Skinny and Baby) begin to lose their nerve and try to convince themselves that it's Mickey's idea of a joke; "It's Mickey's joke, it's Mickey's morning joke!" When this turns out to be false, the Atlantic Club gang prepare for what could be their final night. With just an ancient cutlass and an old Derringer as defence, the group starts to argue amongst themselves and even considers joining Ross or simply leaving.

As the day wears on, people begin to gather outside the club waiting for the doors to open, oblivious to the situation. Sweating it out inside, the small group of four have to break the tragic news of Ezra's grisly death to Baby who takes the news in a dreamlike, distant manner. Uneasy about Baby's mental stability, the Atlantic gang begins to become restless - especially about their catering. Arguments break out over frivolous matters (Skinny's Uncle Tommy), and the group finally settles to consider just what its rivals are doing at that very moment.

In the climax to the fast-paced story, Sweets checks downstairs to see if the coast is clear for the gang to have a little space, rather than being cooped up in a single room and finds Silver Johnny hanging from the ceiling. In sheer panic, Sweets calls for help and is joined by the others. Baby reveals that by saving Silver Johnny he killed Mr Ross and discovered that Mickey had betrayed them all for a share in the business. Skinny arrives and insults Baby, who responds by shooting him in the head with the Derringer. Mickey, Potts and Sweets attempt to cover the wound and to calm Skinny down while Baby wanders around aimlessly. Silver Johnny is lowered to the floor and Skinny dies. Unable to save Skinny's life, Mickey's authority and status break down and he kneels beside his friend's body.

== Film version ==
In 1997, a film adaptation of the stage play was released. It was also written and directed by Butterworth, and starred Ian Hart as Mickey, Ewen Bremner as Skinny, Aidan Gillen as Baby, Harold Pinter as Sam Ross, among others.
