= John-Henry Butterworth =

British screenwriter

- Born: 1976 (age 49–50); London, England, UK
- Occupation: Screenwriter
- Relatives: Jez Butterworth (brother)
- Writing career
- Notable work: Ford v Ferrari (2019)

John-Henry Butterworth is a British screenwriter who has co-written several screenplays with his brother Jez Butterworth. The brothers won the Writers Guild of America's 2011 Paul Selvin Award for their screenplay for the film Fair Game (2010).

== Writing credits ==
Film

- Fair Game (2010)
- Edge of Tomorrow (2014)
- Get On Up (2014) (Also executive producer)
- Despite the Night (2015)
- Ford v Ferrari (2019)
- Flag Day (2021)
- Indiana Jones and the Dial of Destiny (2023)

Television

Year	Title	Notes
2021	Nine Perfect Strangers	3 episodes; Also co-developer and executive producer
2024	The Agency	20 episodes
