= Ian Rickson =

British theatre director (born 1963)

Ian David Rickson (born 1963) is a British theatre director. He was the artistic director at the Royal Court Theatre in London from 1998 to 2006.

== Career ==
Rickson's first professional job as director was at the Royal Court Young People's Theatre in 1990. He was appointed to replace Stephen Daldry as artistic director of the Royal Court Theatre in 1998, after three years there as an associate director. He stayed as artistic director until 2006, overseeing the completion of the new theatre in 1999. While there, he directed Joe Penhall's play Some Voices, Jez Butterworth's play Mojo, Conor McPherson's play The Weir, and Butterworth's play The Night Heron.

Rickson has also directed a production of Hamlet at the Young Vic, starring BAFTA Award-nominee Michael Sheen. He also directed a production of Brian Friel's Translations at the National Theatre.

During the 2020 Covid-19 lockdown, Ian presented a podcast series called "What I Love" featuring interviews with actors, writers, comedians, and producers, conducted on the empty stages of some of Britain’s most iconic theatres, shut down due to the pandemic. Guests in the first series included Kae Tempest, Chiwetel Ejiofor, Cush Jumbo, Ben Whishaw, Sonia Friedman, Russell Brand, Jessie Buckley and Johnny Flynn.

== Personal life ==
Rickson was born in London, and raised in the south of the city. He has a daughter, Eden. And a son, Jack Gould, from a previous relationship. He is a supporter of Charlton Athletic F.C.
