= Universal Attractions Agency =

American talent agency

Universal Attractions, Inc.
- Type: Private
- Founded: New York, New York (1945)
- Headquarters: Midtown Manhattan (United States)
- Key people: Jeff Allen, Co-Owner; Jeff Epstein, Co-Owner
- Website: https://www.universalattractions.com

Universal Attractions Agency (UAA) is an American talent agency. It was founded by Ben Bart (Benjamin Robert Bart, 1906–1968) in 1945. The New York City-based agency is currently under the management of Jeff Allen and Jeff Epstein.

The agency’s history includes launching the career of the soul singer James Brown and representing him for more than 40 years.

== History ==
In 1945, agent Ben Bart decided to resign from his position at The Gale Agency. He opened the Universal Attractions Agency that same year.

== Notable present artists ==
- After 7
- Angela Winbush
- Angie Stone
- Bell Biv DeVoe
- Bobby Brown
- CeCe Winans
- Chaka Khan
- DMX
- Donald Lawrence
- En Vogue
- Heavy D
- Howard Hewett
- J Anthony Brown
- Jennifer Holliday
- Jimmy "JJ" Walker
- Johnny Gill
- KRS-One
- Keith Sweat
- MC Hammer
- Mary Mary
- Mos Def
- Najee
- Phil Perry
- Pieces of a Dream
- Roy Ayers
- SWV
- Salt-N-Pepa
- Slick Rick
- Tevin Campbell
- The Chi-Lites
- The Delfonics
- The Dramatics
- The O'Jays
- The Stylistics
- The Sugarhill Gang
- Too Short
- Ty Herndon
- Walter Beasley

== Notable past artists ==
- Arnett Cobb
- Charles Aznavour
- Chuck Berry
- Cootie Williams
- Dinah Washington
- Grateful Dead
- Hank Ballard and The Midnighters
- James Brown & The Famous Flames
- Jimmy Lunceford
- Joe Tex
- Little Willie John
- The "5" Royales
- The Ravens
- Tiny Bradshaw

== Notable past agents ==
- Dick Allen
- Dick Boone
- James Crawford
- Lewis (Chet) Dillon
- Jack Fink
- Harry Lineshetska
- Joe Marsolais
- Larry Myers
- Marti Otelsburg
- Deloris Rosayler
- Tammy Taylor
