= Michael McCusker =

American film editor (born 1966)

- Born: June 23, 1966 (age 59)
- Occupation: Film editor

Michael "Mike" McCusker (born June 23, 1966) is an American film editor. He has been nominated twice for the Academy Award for Best Film Editing, for the Johnny Cash biopic Walk the Line (2005) and Ford v Ferrari (2019), winning the latter. McCusker frequently collaborates with director James Mangold.

McCusker stated that editing is "a dance of the eyes. It's not just splicing two pieces of film together but compressing time, leading the audience, telling the story through images and dialogue."

== Early life and education ==
Michael McCusker attended New Canaan High School in New Canaan, Connecticut, where he first began writing and making films. After graduation, he attended Emerson College, obtaining a bachelor of fine arts degree in film theory and production in 1988.

== Career ==
McCusker was mentored by film editor David Brenner.

After graduating from Emerson, McCusker drove across country to West Hollywood, California, where he obtained work as a production assistant. Mike McCusker later worked on the television series, The Simpsons. He became interested in film editing and became an assistant editor on a Showtime anthology called Fallen Angels.

After joining the Motion Picture Editors Guild, McCusker teamed up as an assistant film editor to one of Oliver Stone's bevy of hot shot film editors, Academy Award-winning film editor David Brenner. Mike McCusker quickly became David Brenner's first assistant film editor, running the cutting room for five years on films such as The Patriot (2000) and Kate & Leopold (2001). Eventually David Brenner promoted McCusker to the position of associate editor.

When film director James Mangold asked editor David Brenner to cut Walk the Line, Brenner was unavailable. Mangold, in need of an editor with whom he was familiar, propositioned Mike McCusker, offering him the prestigious promotion to film editor. McCusker won the Academy Award for Best Film Editing for Ford v Ferrari with Andrew Buckland.

== Personal life ==
McCusker is married to film producer Deirdre Morrison, whom he met while he was additional editor on the film The Day After Tomorrow.

== Filmography ==
=== As Film Editor ===
- Sax's Final Orbit (1997)
- Kings (1998)
- Walk the Line (Mangold-2005)
- Men in Trees (TV pilot) (2006)
- Walkout (Olmos-2006)
- 3:10 to Yuma (Mangold-2007)
- Australia (Luhrmann-2008; with Dody Dorn)
- Hesher (Susser-2010)
- Knight and Day (Mangold-2010)
- The Wolverine (Mangold-2013)
- Get On Up (Taylor-2014)
- 13 Hours (Bay-2016)
- The Girl on the Train (Taylor-2016)
- Logan (Mangold-2017; Dirk Westervelt)
- Deadpool 2 (Leitch-2018)
- Ford v. Ferrari (Mangold-2019; with Andrew Buckland )
- Unhinged (Borte - 2020)
- Sweet Girl (Mendoza - 2021; with Matt Chessé)
- Indiana Jones and the Dial of Destiny (Mangold - 2023; with Andrew Buckland and Dirk Westervelt)
- The Wrecking Crew (Credited as "Mike McCusker" Manuel Soto - 2026)

=== As Assistant Film Editor ===
- Independence Day (1996) (Assistant Editor)
- Speed 2: Cruise Control (1997) (Assistant Editor)
- What Dreams May Come (1998) (Assistant Editor)
- The Patriot (2000) (First Assistant Editor)
- Kate & Leopold (2001) (First Assistant Editor)
- Identity (2003) (Associate Editor)
- The Day After Tomorrow (2004) (Associate Editor)
- Fantastic Four: Rise of the Silver Surfer (2007) (additional editor)
- Captain America: The First Avenger (2011) (additional editor)
- The Amazing Spider-Man (2012) (additional editor)
- The Dark Tower (2017) (additional editor)

== Awards and nominations ==
Year	Award	Nominated work	Category	Result
2006	Academy Awards	Walk the Line	Best Film Editing	Nominated
2006	ACE Eddie Awards	Walk the Line	Best Edited Feature Film, Comedy or Musical	Won
2009	Satellite Awards	Australia	Best Film Editing	Nominated
2019	Satellite Awards	Ford v Ferrari	Best Film Editing	Won
2020	ACE Eddie Awards	Ford v Ferrari	Best Edited Feature Film, Dramatic	Nominated
2020	British Academy Film Awards	Ford v Ferrari	Best Editing	Won
2020	Academy Awards	Ford v Ferrari	Best Film Editing	Won

== See also ==
- List of film director and editor collaborations
