= Andrew Buckland (film editor) =

American film editor

- Occupation: Film editor
- Years active: 1997–present

Andrew Buckland is an American film editor. He won an Academy Award in the category Best Film Editing for the film Ford v Ferrari (2019).

== Selected filmography ==
- The Girl on the Train (2016; co-edited with Michael McCusker)
- Ford v Ferrari (2019; co-won the Academy Award for Best Film Editing with McCusker)
- The New Mutants (2020; co-edited with Matthew Rundell and Robb Sullivan)
- The Empty Man (2020; co-edited with David Prior)
- Indiana Jones and the Dial of Destiny (2023; co-edited with McCusker and Dirk Westervelt)
- Locked (2025; co-edited with Peter Gvozdas)
