= TSG Entertainment =

American film financing entity

TSG Entertainment Finance LLC
- Logo used since 2013
- Type: Private
- Industry: Entertainment; Media
- Founded: December 19, 2012; 13 years ago
- Founder: Chip Seelig
- Headquarters: Carson City, Nevada
- Key people: Chip Seelig; Robert Seelig
- Services: Film finance; Private equity
- Owner: The Seelig Group
- Website: theseeliggroup.com

TSG Entertainment Finance LLC, commonly known as TSG Entertainment and simply known as TSG, is an American media and entertainment company specializing in funding projects in film and theatre. It was established in 2012 through The Seelig Group by Chip Seelig.

== History ==
The financing entity was founded by former Dune Entertainment partner Chip Seelig with majority of funding from Magnetar Capital. TSG was established to replace Dune Entertainment when Dune did not renew their deal with 20th Century Fox and Fox Searchlight Pictures. Seelig had left Dune in May 2011 to launch a new funding company. TSG was also looking for some ($300–400 million) debt financing from banks at this time. In November 2015, Bona Film Group, a Chinese film studio, invested $235 million in TSG.

Because of the acquisition of The Walt Disney Company and 20th Century Fox on March 20, 2019, Disney inherited Fox's deal with TSG for 20th Century Fox and Fox Searchlight Pictures. From 2013 to 2023, TSG had spent $3.3 billion to help fund 140 projects for Fox. TSG also has a co-financing agreement with Sony Pictures. In 2023, TSG sued Disney, alleging breach of contract in the financing of 20th Century and Searchlight films and their distribution to streaming platforms.

TSG's logo and vanity card depict a man with a bow shooting an arrow through a dozen axe heads, a reference to the feat performed by Odysseus in Book 21 of Homer's Odyssey.

TSG and its owner, The Seelig Group, have also produced stage productions, including the United States national tour of Something Rotten!, Come Alive! The Greatest Showman Circus Spectacular, and the stage adaptation of The Greatest Showman.

== Credits ==
=== Film ===
All films were made in association with TSG Entertainment and is sourced by the BFI (unless otherwise noted).

==== 2013 ====
Release date	Title	Distributor
February 14	A Good Day to Die Hard	20th Century Fox
April 5	Trance	Fox Searchlight Pictures
June 7	The Internship	20th Century Fox
June 28	The Heat	20th Century Fox
July 5	The Way Way Back	Fox Searchlight Pictures
July 26	The Wolverine	20th Century Fox
August 7	Percy Jackson: Sea of Monsters	20th Century Fox
September 20	Enough Said	Fox Searchlight Pictures
September 27	Baggage Claim	Fox Searchlight Pictures
October 25	The Counselor	20th Century Fox
November 8	The Book Thief	20th Century Fox
November 29	Black Nativity	Fox Searchlight Pictures
December 25	The Secret Life of Walter Mitty	20th Century Fox

==== 2014 ====
Release date	Title	Distributor
January 17	Devil's Due	20th Century Fox
March 7	The Grand Budapest Hotel	Fox Searchlight Pictures
April 25	The Other Woman	20th Century Fox
May 2	Belle	Fox Searchlight Pictures
May 23	X-Men: Days of Future Past	20th Century Fox
June 6	The Fault in Our Stars	20th Century Fox
July 11	Dawn of the Planet of the Apes	20th Century Fox
August 15	Let's Be Cops	20th Century Fox
September 12	The Drop	Fox Searchlight Pictures
September 19	The Maze Runner	20th Century Fox
October 3	Gone Girl	20th Century Fox
October 17	Birdman or (the Unexpected Virtue of Ignorance)	Fox Searchlight Pictures
December 5	Wild	Fox Searchlight Pictures
December 12	Exodus: Gods and Kings	20th Century Fox
December 13	Kingsman: The Secret Service	20th Century Fox
December 19	Night at the Museum: Secret of the Tomb	20th Century Fox

==== 2015 ====
Release date	Title	Distributor
January 9	Taken 3	20th Century Fox
March 6	The Second Best Exotic Marigold Hotel	Fox Searchlight Pictures
April 10	The Longest Ride	20th Century Fox
May 1	Far from the Madding Crowd	Fox Searchlight Pictures
May 22	Poltergeist	20th Century Fox
June 5	Spy	20th Century Fox
July 24	Paper Towns	20th Century Fox
August 7	Fantastic Four	20th Century Fox
August 14	Mistress America	Fox Searchlight Pictures
August 21	Hitman: Agent 47	20th Century Fox
September 18	Maze Runner: The Scorch Trials	20th Century Fox
October 2	The Martian	20th Century Fox
November 25	Victor Frankenstein	20th Century Fox
December 18	Alvin and the Chipmunks: The Road Chip	20th Century Fox
December 25	Joy	20th Century Fox

==== 2016 ====
Release date	Title	Distributor
February 12	Deadpool	20th Century Fox
February 26	Eddie the Eagle	20th Century Fox
March 4	The Other Side of the Door	20th Century Fox
April 8	Demolition	Fox Searchlight Pictures
May 27	X-Men: Apocalypse	20th Century Fox
June 24	Independence Day: Resurgence	20th Century Fox
July 8	Mike and Dave Need Wedding Dates	20th Century Fox
July 22	Absolutely Fabulous: The Movie	Fox Searchlight Pictures
September 2	Morgan	20th Century Fox
September 30	Miss Peregrine's Home for Peculiar Children	20th Century Fox
October 7	The Birth of a Nation	Fox Searchlight Pictures
October 21	Keeping Up with the Joneses	20th Century Fox
December 23	Why Him?	20th Century Fox
December 25	Hidden Figures	20th Century Fox

==== 2017 ====
Release date	Title	Distributor
March 3	Logan	20th Century Fox
May 12	Snatched	20th Century Fox
May 17	Wilson	Fox Searchlight Pictures
May 19	Alien: Covenant	20th Century Fox
May 19	Diary of a Wimpy Kid: The Long Haul	20th Century Fox
June 9	My Cousin Rachel	Fox Searchlight Pictures
July 14	War for the Planet of the Apes	20th Century Fox
August 18	Patti Cake$	Fox Searchlight Pictures
September 22	Kingsman: The Golden Circle	20th Century Fox
October 6	The Mountain Between Us	20th Century Fox
October 13	Goodbye Christopher Robin	Fox Searchlight Pictures
November 10	Murder on the Orient Express	20th Century Fox
November 10	Three Billboards Outside Ebbing, Missouri	Fox Searchlight Pictures
December 1	The Shape of Water	Fox Searchlight Pictures
December 20	The Greatest Showman	20th Century Fox
December 22	The Post	20th Century Fox

==== 2018 ====
Release date	Title	Distributor
January 26	Maze Runner: The Death Cure	20th Century Fox
March 2	Red Sparrow	20th Century Fox
May 18	Deadpool 2	20th Century Fox
August 3	The Darkest Minds	20th Century Fox
September 14	The Predator	20th Century Fox
September 28	The Old Man & the Gun	Fox Searchlight Pictures
October 12	Bad Times at the El Royale	20th Century Fox
October 19	Can You Ever Forgive Me?	Fox Searchlight Pictures
November 2	Bohemian Rhapsody	20th Century Fox
November 16	Widows	20th Century Fox
November 23	The Favourite	Fox Searchlight Pictures

==== 2019 ====
Release date	Title	Distributor
January 25	The Kid Who Would Be King	20th Century Fox
February 14	Alita: Battle Angel	20th Century Fox
March 15	The Aftermath	Fox Searchlight Pictures
June 7	Dark Phoenix	20th Century Fox
July 12	Stuber	20th Century Fox
August 21	Ready or Not	Fox Searchlight Pictures
October 4	Lucy in the Sky	Fox Searchlight Pictures
October 18	Jojo Rabbit	Fox Searchlight Pictures
November 1	Terminator: Dark Fate	Paramount Pictures; 20th Century Fox
November 15	Ford v Ferrari	20th Century Fox

==== 2020 ====
Release date	Title	Distributor
January 10	Underwater	20th Century Fox
February 14	Downhill	Searchlight Pictures
February 21	The Call of the Wild	20th Century Studios
February 28	Wendy	Searchlight Pictures
August 28	The New Mutants	20th Century Studios

==== 2021 ====
Release date	Title	Distributor	Ref(s)
October 15	The Last Duel	20th Century Studios	
October 22	Ron's Gone Wrong	20th Century Studios	
October 29	Antlers	Searchlight Pictures	
November 19	Ghostbusters: Afterlife	Sony Pictures Releasing	
November 24	Resident Evil: Welcome to Raccoon City	Sony Pictures Releasing	
December 10	West Side Story	20th Century Studios	
December 17	Nightmare Alley	Searchlight Pictures	
December 25	A Journal for Jordan	Sony Pictures Releasing	

==== 2022 ====
Release date	Title	Distributor	Ref(s)
February 11	Death on the Nile	20th Century Studios	
February 18	Uncharted	Sony Pictures Releasing	
March 18	Umma	Sony Pictures Releasing	
April 1	Morbius	Sony Pictures Releasing	
July 15	Where the Crawdads Sing	Sony Pictures Releasing	
July 18	Bullet Train	Sony Pictures Releasing	
August 26	The Invitation	Sony Pictures Releasing	
September 16	The Woman King	Sony Pictures Releasing	
October 7	Lyle, Lyle, Crocodile	Sony Pictures Releasing	
October 21	The Banshees of Inisherin	Searchlight Pictures	
November 18	The Menu	Searchlight Pictures	
December 9	Empire of Light	Searchlight Pictures	
December 16	Avatar: The Way of Water	20th Century Studios	
December 29	A Man Called Otto	Sony Pictures Releasing	

==== 2023 ====
Release date	Title	Distributor	Ref(s)
January 20	Missing	Sony Pictures Releasing	
March 10	65	Sony Pictures Releasing	
April 14	The Pope's Exorcist	Sony Pictures Releasing	
April 21	Chevalier	Searchlight Pictures	
April 28	Big George Foreman	Sony Pictures Releasing	
May 5	Love Again	Sony Pictures Releasing	
May 12	Knights of the Zodiac	Sony Pictures Releasing	
June 2	The Boogeyman	20th Century Studios	
June 7	Insidious: The Red Door	Sony Pictures Releasing	
June 23	No Hard Feelings	Sony Pictures Releasing	
July 14	Theater Camp	Searchlight Pictures	
August 25	Gran Turismo	Sony Pictures Releasing	
September 1	The Equalizer 3	Sony Pictures Releasing	
September 15	A Haunting in Venice	20th Century Studios	
September 15	Dumb Money	Sony Pictures Releasing	
November 10	Journey to Bethlehem	Sony Pictures Releasing	
November 17	Next Goal Wins	Searchlight Pictures	
November 17	Thanksgiving	Sony Pictures Releasing	
December 8	Poor Things	Searchlight Pictures	
December 22	All of Us Strangers	Searchlight Pictures	
December 22	Anyone but You	Sony Pictures Releasing	

==== 2024 ====
Release date	Title	Distributor	Ref(s)
February 14	Madame Web	Sony Pictures Releasing	
March 22	Ghostbusters: Frozen Empire	Sony Pictures Releasing	
April 5	The First Omen	20th Century Studios	
May 3	Tarot	Sony Pictures Releasing	
May 10	Kingdom of the Planet of the Apes	20th Century Studios	
June 7	Bad Boys: Ride or Die	Sony Pictures Releasing	
June 21	Kinds of Kindness	Searchlight Pictures	
July 26	Deadpool & Wolverine	Walt Disney Studios Motion Pictures	
August 2	Harold and the Purple Crayon	Sony Pictures Releasing	
August 9	It Ends with Us	Sony Pictures Releasing	
August 16	Alien: Romulus	20th Century Studios	
August 30	Afraid	Sony Pictures Releasing	
September 27	Saturday Night	Sony Pictures Releasing	
October 25	Venom: The Last Dance	Sony Pictures Releasing	
December 13	Kraven the Hunter	Sony Pictures Releasing	
December 25	A Complete Unknown	Searchlight Pictures	

==== 2025 ====
Release date	Title	Distributor	Ref(s)
January 7	One of Them Days	Sony Pictures Releasing	
April 25	Until Dawn	Sony Pictures Releasing	
May 30	Karate Kid: Legends	Sony Pictures Releasing	
June 20	28 Years Later	Sony Pictures Releasing	
July 18	I Know What You Did Last Summer	Sony Pictures Releasing	
August 29	Caught Stealing	Sony Pictures Releasing	
September 19	A Big Bold Beautiful Journey	Sony Pictures Releasing	
November 7	Predator: Badlands	20th Century Studios	
November 7	The Choral	Sony Pictures Classics	
November 21	Rental Family	Searchlight Pictures	
December 19	Avatar: Fire and Ash	20th Century Studios	
December 19	Is This Thing On?	Searchlight Pictures	
December 25	Anaconda	Sony Pictures Releasing	

==== 2026 ====
Release date	Title	Distributor	Ref(s)
January 16	28 Years Later: The Bone Temple	Sony Pictures Releasing	
January 30	Send Help	20th Century Studios	
February 13	Goat	Sony Pictures Releasing	
May 29	The Breadwinner	Sony Pictures Releasing	
July 31	Spider-Man: Brand New Day	Sony Pictures Releasing	
November 6	Wild Horse Nine	Searchlight Pictures	

=== Theatre ===
Years	Title	Production	Credit
2017–2019	Something Rotten!	United States national tour	Presented by The Seelig Group
2024–present	Come Alive! The Greatest Showman Circus Spectacular	Empress Museum, Earls Court, London	Produced with Outside The Box Amusements
2026	Come Alive! The Greatest Showman Circus Spectacular	Australian national tour	Presented by Showpath Entertainment, Outside The Box Amusements and TSG Entertainment
2026–2027	The Greatest Showman	Bristol Hippodrome; Theatre Royal Drury Lane	Produced with Disney Theatrical Group
