= Monica Huppert =

Canadian make-up artist

- Born: 1964 (age 60–61); Vancouver, Canada
- Occupation: makeup artist

Monica Huppert (born 1964) is a Canadian make-up artist who has worked in Tomorrowland, Stargate SG-1, Star Trek Beyond and Deadpool. She won the Saturn Award in 2017 for the Best Make-Up for her work on "Star Trek: Beyond" with Joel Harlow. She made her name working in the Canadian film sets where she identified working with the cold, drying out the actors skin was one of the issues she had to deal with. In Deadpool 2 Huppert headed up the Makeup Department as well as being responsible for "Domino's" makeup. Sappho New Paradigm produce an eyeshadow named after her.

== Selected filmography ==
- Deadpool 2, 2018
- Death Note, 2017
- Power Rangers, 2017
- Deadpool, 2016
- Star Trek Beyond, 2016
- The Age of Adaline, 2015
- Tomorrowland, 2015
- Seventh Son, 2014
- Hector and the Search for Happiness, 2014
- Warm Bodies, 2013
- 50/50, 2011
- Mission: Impossible – Ghost Protocol, 2011
- Red Riding Hood, 2011
- Marmaduke, 2010
- Juno, 2007
- The Last Mimzy, 2007
- Snakes on a Plane, 2006
- Fantastic Four, 2005
- The Fog, 2005
- The 4400, 2004
- The Chronicles of Riddick, 2004
- Dead Like Me, 2003
- Final Destination 2, 2003
- X2, 2003
- Dark Angel, 2000
- Stargate SG-1, 1999
