= Come Alive! The Greatest Showman Circus Spectacular =

Theatrical Production

Come Alive! The Greatest Showman Circus Spectacular is a circus and musical theatre production based on the 20^{th} Century Studios 2017 film The Greatest Showman, which is a heavily fictionalized depiction of the life of P. T. Barnum (later of Barnum & Bailey Circus). The production tells a new, original story set within a contemporary circus, rather than adapting the film's story or characters directly. All the songs from the film are included, written by the film's songwriters, Benj Pasek and Justin Paul, alongside live circus acts, singers and dancers.

== Background ==
On 12 June 2024, it was announced that Come Alive! The Greatest Showman Circus Spectacular would be coming to London, inspired by The Greatest Showman, and would premiere in a purpose built 700 seat big top at the Empress Museum in Earls Court. Based on the 2017 film which starred Hugh Jackman, Zendaya, Michelle Williams and Zac Efron, with numbers including "This Is Me" and "From Now On".

It is helmed by creative director Simon Hammerstein, with a creative team that includes music producer Matthew Brind, choreographers Jerry Reeve and Lukas McFarlane, lighting designer Adam Bassett for Woodroffe Basset Design, set designer Ruby Law, costume designer Susan Kulkarni, art director Mika Handley, and casting by Pearson Casting.

As producer Chip Seelig noted in Variety, Come Alive! "create(s) an updated story that leans into the themes of the movie – love story, family reunification, but is set today, and then the backdrop the story is told in the context of a circus."

== Productions ==
=== London ===
The world premiere of Come Alive! opened at the Empress Museum in Earl's Court, London, on 23 September 2024. At the helm of the production is creative director Simon Hammerstein, while the show is choreographed by Jerry Reeves and Lukas Macfarlane and produced by Outside The Box Amusements.

The venue, part of the wider Earls Court Development Project and previously home to the BBC Earth Experience, houses a 700‑seat big top with seating arranged in the round around a central ring, as well as food courts, bars and a VIP terrace area used for the pre‑show experience. The pre-show features "a wealth of things to explore before the show itself starts, including a museum dedicated to the history of the circus, live actors interacting with spectators, one-man circus performances and food and drink."

The production has "a blend of circus performers, singers and dancers" according to an interview with producer Chip Seelig in Variety. Earl's Court Development project have estimated that Come Alive! has contributed to an overall generation of "£51.5m in local spend, since 2021, according to an annual Impact Report published by the Earls Court Development Company, and with a GVA of £28.6m to the local area." Come Alive! has been described as "a must-see for fans of the film, and circus fans, alike."

=== Australian tour and venues ===
An Australian touring production of Come Alive! The Greatest Showman Circus Spectacular was announced in November 2025, with performances scheduled under a big top in multiple cities during 2026 and 2027. The tour opened at the Entertainment Quarter in Sydney on 26 May 2026, before moving to Ozone Reserve in Perth from 27 August, Morphettville Racecourse in Adelaide from 29 October, Royal Queensland Golf Course in Brisbane from 29 December, and Caulfield Racecourse in Melbourne from 25 February 2027.

== Notable cast ==
Character	London (2024-2025)	London (2025-2026)
The Showman	Simon Bailey	Simon Bailey
Max	Aaliya Mai	Anoushka Tandon-Sangar
Singers	Jason Brock, Jaz Ellington, Charlotte Hannah-Jones, Whitney Martins, Fallon Mondlane	Whitney Martins, Jaz Ellington, Eva Yuste, Greg Oliver, Maia Hawkins, Micky Dumoulin
Circus Performers	Juan Anyosa, Korri Aulakh, Klodi Dabkiewicz, Bella Diosa, Yann Le Blanc, Dave Locke, Rachel Locks, Daniel Luengo Quintero, Shona Morgan, Dean Murrell, Theddy Nardin, Manases Palacios Molano, Antino Pansa, Joel Roxendal, Itzel Salvatierra, Josephine Urry	Bella Diosa, Tybald Griesbacher, Roman Karpovich, Jackie Le, Dean Murrell, Sam Nash, Antino Tisson Pansa, Josephine Urry, Jimmy Wong, Sebastian Krefelo, Eric McGill, Ebony Gumbs, Nathan Briscoe, Sam Barnes, Shona Morgan, Tara Talland, Korri Aulakh
Dancers	Maisie Axton, Genie Gledhill, Mia Jayne, Konnie Karachaliou, Ebby Sama, Emma-Louise Stansall, Ross Wilkins	Genie Gledhill, Mia Jayne, Ebby Sama, Ross Wilkins, Elliott Brady, Ethan Brenchley, Rachel Gardiner, Grace Hope Charles
Magician	Kieron The Mighty	Kieron The Mighty

== Media ==
Come Alive! The Greatest Showman Circus Spectacular performed as part of BBC Children In Need in 2024, on Britain's Got Talent and BBC's Blue Peter in 2025. It has also been featured on The One Show, Heart Radio and internationally.

== Producers ==
Come Alive! The Greatest Showman Circus Spectacular is produced by The Seelig Group, Chip Seelig and Lana Lort.
