= List of Working Title Films productions =

Productions by British-American film and TV company

Working Title Films is a British-American film and television production company that is a subsidiary of NBCUniversal, which is itself a division of Comcast.

== Films ==
=== 1980s ===
Release date	Title	Notes
15 November 1985	My Beautiful Laundrette	with Channel Four Films
24 July 1987	Wish You Were Here	with Channel Four Films
30 October 1987	Sammy and Rosie Get Laid	with Channel Four Films
17 June 1988	A World Apart	
10 September 1988	Paperhouse	with Vestron Pictures
13 April 1989	The Tall Guy	with London Weekend Television
19 May 1989	For Queen and Country	
14 November 1989	Diamond Skulls	

=== 1990s ===
Release date	Title	Notes
22 June 1990	Fools of Fortune	with PolyGram Filmed Entertainment and Channel Four Films
27 July 1990	Chicago Joe and the Showgirl	with PolyGram Filmed Entertainment and New Line Cinema
13 May 1991	Robin Hood	
24 May 1991	Drop Dead Fred	with PolyGram Filmed Entertainment and New Line Cinema
18 October 1991	Edward II	
13 December 1991	London Kills Me	with PolyGram Filmed Entertainment and Fine Line Features
15 May 1992	Rubin & Ed	with PolyGram Filmed Entertainment
17 July 1992	Dakota Road	with Channel Four Films, British Screen Productions and Mayfair Entertainment
4 September 1992	Bob Roberts	with PolyGram Filmed Entertainment, Paramount Pictures, Miramax Films and LIVE Entertainment
23 April 1993	Map of the Human Heart	with PolyGram Filmed Entertainment and Miramax Films
14 May 1993	Posse	with PolyGram Filmed Entertainment and Gramercy Pictures
8 October 1993	The Young Americans	with PolyGram Filmed Entertainment and Live Entertainment
4 February 1994	Romeo Is Bleeding	with PolyGram Filmed Entertainment and Gramercy Pictures
9 March 1994	Four Weddings and a Funeral	with PolyGram Filmed Entertainment, Channel Four Films and Gramercy Pictures
11 March 1994	The Hudsucker Proxy	with PolyGram Filmed Entertainment, Warner Bros. and Silver Pictures
3 May 1995	Panther	with PolyGram Filmed Entertainment and Gramercy Pictures
5 May 1995	French Kiss	with PolyGram Filmed Entertainment and 20th Century Fox
29 September 1995	Moonlight and Valentino	with PolyGram Filmed Entertainment and Gramercy Pictures
29 December 1995	Dead Man Walking	with PolyGram Filmed Entertainment and Gramercy Pictures
8 March 1996	Fargo	with PolyGram Filmed Entertainment and Gramercy Pictures
22 March 1996	Land and Freedom	with PolyGram Filmed Entertainment and Gramercy Pictures
20 September 1996	Loch Ness	with PolyGram Filmed Entertainment and Gramercy Pictures
7 March 1997	The Eighth Day	with PolyGram Filmed Entertainment and Gramercy Pictures
3 October 1997	The Matchmaker	with PolyGram Filmed Entertainment and Gramercy Pictures
17 October 1997	Bean	with PolyGram Filmed Entertainment, Tiger Aspect Films and Gramercy Pictures
13 February 1998	The Borrowers	with PolyGram Filmed Entertainment and Gramercy Pictures
6 March 1998	The Big Lebowski	with PolyGram Filmed Entertainment and Gramercy Pictures
6 November 1998	Elizabeth	with PolyGram Filmed Entertainment, StudioCanal, Channel Four Films and Gramercy Pictures
30 December 1998	The Hi-Lo Country	with PolyGram Filmed Entertainment and Gramercy Pictures
28 May 1999	Notting Hill	with PolyGram Filmed Entertainment, StudioCanal and Universal Pictures
1 October 1999	Plunkett & Macleane	with StudioCanal, PolyGram Filmed Entertainment and Gramercy Pictures

=== 2000s ===
Release date	Title	Notes
31 March 2000	High Fidelity	with Touchstone Pictures
13 October 2000	Billy Elliot	with BBC Films, Tiger Aspect Productions, StudioCanal and Universal Pictures
22 December 2000	O Brother, Where Art Thou?	with Touchstone Pictures, Universal Pictures and StudioCanal
13 April 2001	Bridget Jones's Diary	with Universal Pictures, StudioCanal and Miramax Films
25 May 2001	The Man Who Cried	with StudioCanal, Universal Pictures and Adventure Pictures
17 August 2001	Captain Corelli's Mandolin	with Universal Pictures, StudioCanal and Miramax Films
2 November 2001	The Man Who Wasn't There	with USA Films, Gramercy Pictures and Good Machine
18 January 2002	Long Time Dead	with Universal Pictures and Focus Features
1 March 2002	40 Days and 40 Nights	with Universal Pictures, StudioCanal and Miramax Films
17 May 2002	About a Boy	with Universal Pictures, StudioCanal and TriBeCa Productions
5 September 2002	Ali G Indahouse	with Universal Pictures and StudioCanal
31 January 2003	The Guru	co-production with StudioCanal and Universal Pictures
16 May 2003	The Shape of Things	with Focus Features and StudioCanal
18 July 2003	Johnny English	with Universal Pictures and StudioCanal
14 November 2003	Love Actually	with Universal Pictures, StudioCanal and DNA Films
5 December 2003	Thirteen	with Fox Searchlight Pictures, Universal Pictures and Antidote Films
26 March 2004	Ned Kelly	with Focus Features and StudioCanal
30 July 2004	Thunderbirds	with StudioCanal and Universal Pictures
17 September 2004	Wimbledon	with Universal Pictures and StudioCanal
24 September 2004	Shaun of the Dead	with Universal Pictures, StudioCanal and Rogue Pictures
19 November 2004	Bridget Jones: The Edge of Reason	with Universal Pictures, StudioCanal and Miramax Films
4 February 2005	Inside I'm Dancing	with Focus Features and StudioCanal
25 March 2005	Mickybo and Me	with Universal Pictures, StudioCanal, Irish Film Board, Northern Ireland Film & Television Commission, WT^{2} Productions and Moving Picture Company
22 April 2005	The Interpreter	with Universal Pictures and StudioCanal
23 November 2005	Pride & Prejudice	with Focus Features and StudioCanal
27 January 2006	Nanny McPhee	with Universal Pictures and StudioCanal
28 April 2006	United 93	with Universal Pictures and StudioCanal
27 October 2006	Catch a Fire	with Focus Features, StudioCanal and Mirage Enterprises
26 January 2007	Smokin' Aces	with Universal Pictures and StudioCanal
20 April 2007	Hot Fuzz	with Universal Pictures, StudioCanal and Rogue Pictures
24 August 2007	Mr. Bean's Holiday	with Universal Pictures, StudioCanal and Tiger Aspect Films
12 October 2007	Elizabeth: The Golden Age	with Universal Pictures and StudioCanal
7 December 2007	Atonement	with Focus Features and StudioCanal
14 February 2008	Definitely, Maybe	with Universal Pictures and StudioCanal
12 September 2008	Burn After Reading	with Focus Features, Relativity Media and StudioCanal
5 December 2008	Frost/Nixon	with Universal Pictures, Imagine Entertainment and StudioCanal
17 April 2009	State of Play	with Universal Pictures and StudioCanal
24 April 2009	The Soloist	with DreamWorks Pictures, Universal Pictures, Participant Media, StudioCanal and Krasnoff/Foster Entertainment
2 October 2009	A Serious Man	with Focus Features, Relativity Media and StudioCanal
13 November 2009	Pirate Radio	with Universal Pictures and StudioCanal

=== 2010s ===
Release date	Title	Notes
12 March 2010	Green Zone	with Universal Pictures and StudioCanal
3 June 2010	Senna	with Universal Pictures and StudioCanal
20 August 2010	Nanny McPhee and the Big Bang	with Universal Pictures and StudioCanal
18 March 2011	Paul	with Universal Pictures and StudioCanal
21 October 2011	Johnny English Reborn	with Universal Pictures and StudioCanal
9 December 2011	Tinker Tailor Soldier Spy	with Focus Features and StudioCanal
13 January 2012	Contraband	with Universal Pictures, Relativity Media, Blueeyes Productions, Leverage Entertainment and Closest to the Hole Productions
3 February 2012	Big Miracle	with Universal Pictures and Anonymous Content
16 November 2012	Anna Karenina	with Focus Features and StudioCanal
25 December 2012	Les Misérables	with Universal Pictures, Relativity Media and Cameron Mackintosh, Ltd.
23 August 2013	The World's End	with Universal Pictures, Focus Features, and Relativity Media
28 August 2013	Closed Circuit	with Focus Features
20 September 2013	Rush	with Universal Pictures, Imagine Entertainment, Exclusive Media, Cross Creek Pictures and Revolution Films
1 November 2013	About Time	with Universal Pictures and StudioCanal
28 August 2014	The Two Faces of January	with StudioCanal and Magnolia Pictures
9 October 2014	Trash	with StudioCanal, O2 Filmes and PeaPie Films
7 November 2014	The Theory of Everything	with Focus Features
28 August 2015	We Are Your Friends	with Warner Bros. Pictures, StudioCanal and RatPac Entertainment
18 September 2015	Everest	with Universal Pictures, Walden Media and Cross Creek Pictures
14 October 2015	The Program	with StudioCanal
20 November 2015	Legend	with Universal Pictures, StudioCanal, Cross Creek Pictures and Anton Capital Entertainment
27 November 2015	The Danish Girl	with Pretty Pictures, Revision Pictures, Senator Global Productions, Universal Pictures International and Focus Features
5 February 2016	Hail, Caesar!	with Universal Pictures and Mike Zoss Productions
11 March 2016	The Brothers Grimsby	with Columbia Pictures, Village Roadshow Pictures Big Talk Productions and Four by Two Productions
16 September 2016	Bridget Jones's Baby	with StudioCanal, Miramax and Universal Pictures
30 June 2017	Baby Driver	with Big Talk Productions, TriStar Pictures and Media Rights Capital
15 September 2017	Victoria and Abdul	with BBC Films, Focus Features and Universal Pictures
13 October 2017	The Snowman	with Universal Pictures, Perfect World Pictures and Another Park Film
22 November 2017	Darkest Hour	with Universal Pictures, Focus Features and Perfect World Pictures
16 March 2018	7 Days in Entebbe	with Participant Media and Focus Features
5 October 2018	Johnny English Strikes Again	with StudioCanal, Perfect World Pictures and Universal Pictures
7 December 2018	Mary Queen of Scots	with Perfect World Pictures and Focus Features
25 January 2019	The Kid Who Would Be King	with Big Talk Productions and 20th Century Fox
28 June 2019	Yesterday	with Universal Pictures, Perfect World Pictures and Decibel Films
20 December 2019	Cats	with Universal Pictures, Amblin Entertainment, Monumental Pictures and Really Useful Group

=== 2020s ===
Release date	Title	Notes
21 February 2020	Emma	with Focus Features, Blueprint Pictures and Perfect World Pictures
29 May 2020	The High Note	with Focus Features and Perfect World Pictures
15 June 2020	Radioactive	with StudioCanal and Amazon Studios
16 October 2020	Rebecca	with Netflix and Big Talk Productions
29 October 2021	Last Night in Soho	with Focus Features, Film4 Productions and Complete Fiction
25 February 2022	Cyrano	with Metro-Goldwyn-Mayer and Bron Creative
23 September 2022	Catherine Called Birdy	with Amazon Studios and Good Thing Going
21 October 2022	Ticket to Paradise	with Universal Pictures, Red Om Films, and Smokehouse Pictures
11 November 2022	The Swimmers	with Netflix
9 December 2022	Matilda the Musical	with Netflix, TriStar Pictures and the Roald Dahl Story Company
24 February 2023	What's Love Got to Do with It?	with StudioCanal and Instinct Productions
28 April 2023	Polite Society	with Focus Features and Parkville Pictures
22 November 2023	Genie	with Peacock, Universal Pictures, and Linden Productions
23 February 2024	Drive-Away Dolls	with Focus Features
20 September 2024	The Substance	with Blacksmith and Mubi
1 November 2024	Blitz	with Apple TV+, Regency Enterprises, New Regency and Lammas Park
13 February 2025	Bridget Jones: Mad About the Boy	with Miramax, StudioCanal and Universal Pictures
22 August 2025	Honey Don't!	with Focus Features
12 December 2025	Goodbye June	with Netflix
13 February 2026	Crime 101	with Metro-Goldwyn-Mayer, Raw, The Story Company and Wild State
8 May 2026	The Sheep Detectives	with Metro-Goldwyn-Mayer, Lord Miller Productions and Three Strange Angels Productions
29 May 2026	Pressure	with Focus Features and StudioCanal
28 August 2026	Finding Emily	with Focus Features and Parkville Pictures
16 October 2026	Sense and Sensibility	with Focus Features and November Pictures

== Upcoming ==
Release date	Title	Notes
25 December 2026	Werwulf †	with Focus Features and Maiden Voyage Pictures
TBA	Action Man †	with Hasbro Entertainment
TBA	Falling †	with Universal Pictures
TBA	In Five Years †	with New Line Cinema
TBA	Johnny English 4 †	with StudioCanal
TBA	Positano †	with Netflix
TBA	Relax †	with Independent Entertainment

Key
†	Denotes films that have not yet been released

== Television ==
Title	Years	Co-production(s)	Network	Notes
The Borrowers	1992		BBC Two	
Tales of the City	1993	Propaganda Films	Channel Four	
The Baldy Man	1994–1999	Central Independent Television	ITV	
Randall & Hopkirk (Deceased)	2000–2002		BBC One	
The Tudors	2007–2011	Reveville Erie; Octagon Entertainment; Peace Arch Entertainment; Showtime Networks	BBC Two; CBC Television; Showtime; TV3	
Love Bites	2011	Loud Blouse Productions; Universal Television	NBC	
Yonderland	2013–2016		Sky 1	
About a Boy	2014–2015	True Jack Productions; Tribeca Productions; Universal Television	NBC	
You, Me and the Apocalypse	2015	BigBalls Films; British Sky Broadcasting; NBCUniversal International Studios	Sky 1 NBC	
London Spy	2015	NBCUniversal International Studios; BBC America	BBC Two	
Gypsy	2017	Rhythm Arts Entertainment; Pen and Paper Industries; Universal Television	Netflix	
Hanna	2019–2021	Amazon Studios; Tomorrow Studios; Focus Features; NBCUniversal International Studios	Amazon Prime Video	
The Case Against Adnan Syed	2019	Instinct Productions; Disarming Films; HBO Documentary Films; NBCUniversal International Studios	HBO	
Armistead Maupin's Tales of the City	2019	Sweatpants Productions; Universal Television; NBCUniversal International Studios	Netflix	
The Luminaries	2020	Southern Light Films; TVNZ; Fremantle; Silver Reel	TVNZ; BBC One	
We Are Lady Parts	2021–2024		Channel 4	
Everything I Know About Love	2022	Universal International Studios	BBC One	
Too Much	2025	Universal International Studios; Good Thing Going	Netflix	
