= Johnny English Reborn (soundtrack) =

Film score by Ilan Eshkeri
- Released: 1 November 2011
- Genre: Soundtrack
- Label: Varèse Sarabande
- Producers: Ilan Eshkeri; Steve McLaughlin

Johnny English chronology
| Johnny English (2003) | Johnny English Reborn (2011) | Johnny English Strikes Again (2018) |

Johnny English Reborn is a motion picture soundtrack to the 2011 film of the same name written by the English film composer Ilan Eshkeri. The song "I Believe in You" by Rumer, that is heard in the end credits of the film, is not included in the soundtrack.

Eshkeri also hired songwriter Andy Burrows to assist with the John English Reborn soundtrack.

== Track listing ==
The track listing for the Johnny English Reborn soundtrack is shown below.

Original track list
| No. | Title | Length |
|---|---|---|
| 1. | "London" | 1:34 |
| 2. | "The Toy Cupboard" | 2:09 |
| 3. | "Hong Kong" | 2:20 |
| 4. | "Rooftop Chase" | 2:57 |
| 5. | "Commandeering The Vessel" | 1:31 |
| 6. | "Bravo Commander" | 0:40 |
| 7. | "Killer Cleaner" | 1:34 |
| 8. | "Hypnotification" | 2:06 |
| 9. | "Karlenko Arrives" | 0:29 |
| 10. | "Golf" | 2:21 |
| 11. | "Helicopter" | 2:28 |
| 12. | "Church Escape" | 1:53 |
| 13. | "Wheelchair" | 3:43 |
| 14. | "Ambrose" | 1:01 |
| 15. | "Timoxybarbobutenol" | 1:46 |
| 16. | "Tucker Shoots Johnny" | 1:23 |
| 17. | "Poisoning The Drink" | 1:07 |
| 18. | "The Manic Phase" | 4:07 |
| 19. | "Lipstick Gun" | 3:14 |
| 20. | "Johnny Reborn" | 2:19 |
| 21. | "Cliff Jump" | 2:32 |
| 22. | "Umbrella" | 0:44 |
| 23. | "Buckingham Palace" | 1:04 |
| 24. | "Killer Queener" | 1:09 |
