= Johnny English (film series) =

British series of spy-action comedy films parodying James Bond

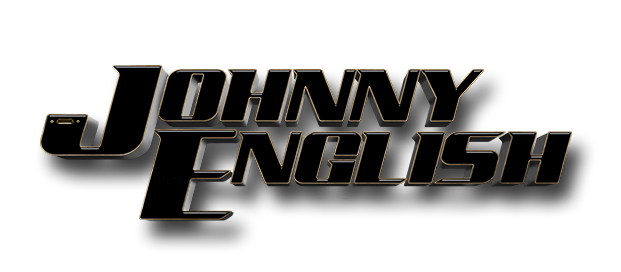
- Official film series logo
- Created by: Neal Purvis; Robert Wade; William Davies
- Original work: Johnny English (2003)
- Owner: Universal Pictures
- Years: 2003–present

Films and television
- Film(s): Johnny English (2003); Johnny English Reborn (2011); Johnny English Strikes Again (2018); Untitled fourth film (TBA)

Audio
- Soundtrack(s): Johnny English; Johnny English Reborn; Johnny English Strikes Again

Johnny English is a series of spy action comedy films parodying the James Bond secret agent genre. It features Rowan Atkinson as the title character, based on the screenplay written by Neal Purvis, Robert Wade and William Davies. The series includes three instalments: Johnny English (2003), Johnny English Reborn (2011), and Johnny English Strikes Again (2018). A fourth instalment is currently in development.

The series has grossed $479.6 million worldwide, despite generally mixed critical reviews.

== Films ==
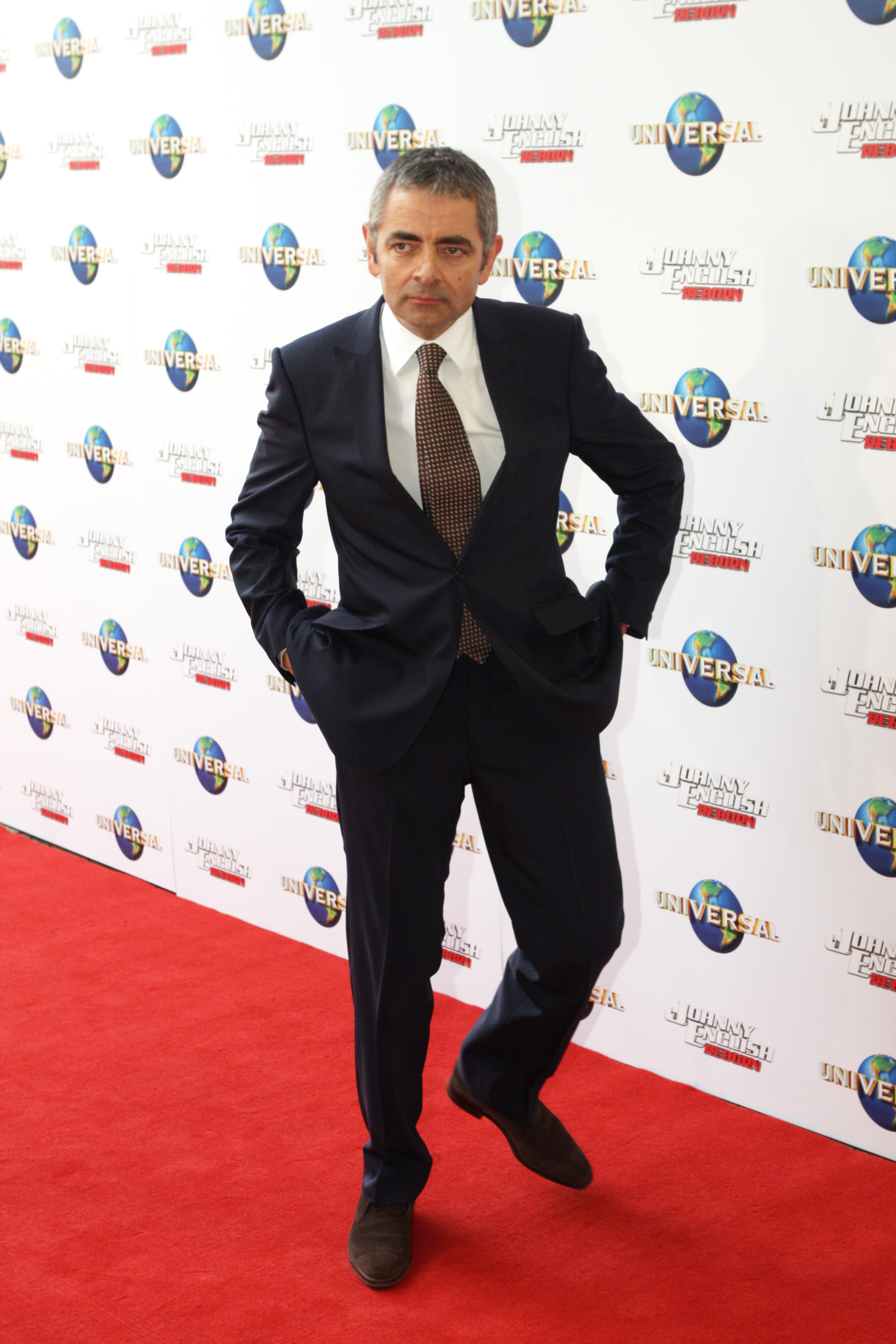
Rowan Atkinson at the premiere of Johnny English Reborn.

=== Johnny English (2003) ===
Johnny English, an incompetent MI7 office worker, is promoted to top agent and tasked to investigate the theft of the Crown Jewels.

=== Johnny English Reborn (2011) ===
Five years after a failed mission that cost him his knighthood, Johnny English sharpens his skills at a Tibetan monastery and returns to service to protect the Chinese premier from an assassin.

=== Johnny English Strikes Again (2018) ===
After retiring from MI7 and becoming a geography teacher, Johnny English is brought back to investigate cyber attacks launched in the United Kingdom.

=== Future ===
In an "ask me anything" Reddit thread in October 2018, when asked about more Johnny English films, Rowan Atkinson replied with: "I doubt it but thank you very much for implying you'd like to see another one. But at the same time...never say never".

In February 2024, it was announced that a fourth instalment was set to begin shooting in the summer of 2024 in Malta and the United Kingdom. Production was originally set to begin on 30 September 2024 in London, with William Davies and Eric Fellner producing, although the project is still in development and its status remains unclear. In April 2026, the film was listed as completed.

== Cast ==
| Character | Film | | | |
| Character | Johnny English | Johnny English Reborn | Johnny English Strikes Again | Untitled fourth film |
| Character | 2003 | 2011 | 2018 | TBA |
|---|---|---|---|---|
| Johnny English | Rowan Atkinson | Rowan Atkinson | Rowan Atkinson | Rowan Atkinson |
| Jeremy Bough | Ben Miller | | Ben Miller | |
| Colin Tucker | | Daniel Kaluuya | | |
| Pegasus | Tim Pigott-Smith | Gillian Anderson | Adam James | |
| Prime Minister of the United Kingdom | Kevin McNally | Stephen Campbell Moore | Emma Thompson | |
| Queen Elizabeth II | Prunella Scales | Body Double | | |
| Lorna Campbell | Natalie Imbruglia | | | |
| Kate Sumner | | Rosamund Pike | | |
| Ophelia Bhuletova | | | Olga Kurylenko | |
| Pascal Sauvage | John Malkovich | | | |
| Simon Ambrose | | Dominic West | | |
| Jason Volta | | | Jake Lacy | |

== Crew ==
| Crew/Detail | Film | | | |
| Crew/Detail | Johnny English 2003 | Johnny English Reborn 2011 | Johnny English Strikes Again 2018 | Untitled fourth film TBA |
|---|---|---|---|---|
| Director | Peter Howitt | Oliver Parker | David Kerr | TBA |
| Producers | Tim Bevan; Eric Fellner; Mark Huffam | Tim Bevan; Eric Fellner; Chris Clark | Tim Bevan; Eric Fellner; Chris Clark; Rowan Atkinson | William Davies; Eric Fellner |
| Written by | Neal Purvis and Robert Wade; William Davies | Hamish McColl (screenplay); William Davies (story) | William Davies | TBA |
| Composer | Edward Shearmur; Howard Goodall (theme music); Hans Zimmer (A Man for All Seasons) | Ilan Eshkeri | Howard Goodall | TBA |
| Cinematography | Remi Adefarasin | Danny Cohen | Florian Hoffmeister | TBA |
| Editor | Robin Sales | Guy Bensley | Mark Everson | TBA |
| Production Companies | StudioCanal; Working Title Films | StudioCanal; Working Title Films; Relativity Media | StudioCanal; Working Title Films; Perfect World Pictures | TBA |
| Distributor | Universal Pictures | Universal Pictures | Universal Pictures | TBA |
| Release date | 11 July 2003 (UK); 18 July 2003 (US) | 7 October 2011 (UK); 21 October 2011 (US) | 10 October 2018 (UK); 26 October 2018 (US) | TBA |
| Running time | 88 minutes | 102 minutes | 89 minutes | TBA |

== Reception ==
=== Box office performance ===
| Film | Release date | Box office gross | | | Box office ranking | Budget | Ref(s) |
| Film | Release date | North America | Other territories | Worldwide | All time North America | Budget | Ref(s) |
|---|---|---|---|---|---|---|---|
| Johnny English | 11 April 2003 | $28,082,366 | $132,500,652 | $160,583,018 | #2,776 | $40 million | |
| Johnny English Reborn | 7 October 2011 | $8,305,970 | $151,772,616 | $160,078,586 | #4,925 | $45 million | |
| Johnny English Strikes Again | 5 October 2018 | $4,412,170 | $154,558,606 | $158,970,776 | #5,851 | $25 million | |
| Total | | $40.8 million | $438.8 million | $479.6 million | | $110 million | |
List indicator^{(A)} indicates the adjusted totals based on current ticket prices (calculated by Box Office Mojo).

=== Critical and public response ===
| Film | Critical | | Public |
| Film | Rotten Tomatoes | Metacritic | CinemaScore |
|---|---|---|---|
| Johnny English | 33% (121 reviews) | 51 (32 reviews) | B |
| Johnny English Reborn | 38% (91 reviews) | 46 (20 reviews) | B |
| Johnny English Strikes Again | 37% (105 reviews) | 39 (22 reviews) | —N/a |

== See also ==
- Outline of James Bond
