= MI7 =

UK government Agency

MI7 was a branch of the British War Office's Directorate of Military Intelligence with responsibilities for press liaison and propaganda. The branch was originally established in the First World War and disbanded after the signing of the Armistice. The branch was re-formed at the start of the Second World War. The new MI7, while less significant than its predecessor, acted as a necessary liaison link between the War Office and the Ministry of Information and Political Warfare Executive.

== First World War ==
On the outbreak of the First World War, a subsection of the Directorate of Military Operations, MO5(h), was established with responsibility for press and cable censorship and the issuing of War Office communiques through the Press Bureau. Initially just two General Staff Officers (GSO2) were allocated to the subsection. It became immediately apparent that two men were insufficient for the task and within a fortnight the subsection was expanded to a senior General Staff Officer (GSO1) with eight assistant "censors" working under him.

In February 1915, the Directorate of Special Intelligence was formed, and consequently MO5(h) was upgraded and designated as the MO7 section. It was nominally under the command of Colonel Coleridge, the Military Assistant Director of the Press Bureau. As part of the War Office, MO7 was concerned with press publicity. It gave the first war correspondents permission to visit the Western Front in May 1915. Its duty was to ensure that the military authorities maintained control over the Press and correspondents' work. In January 1916, as part of a reorganisation of the Imperial General Staff, a new Directorate of Military Intelligence was created and MO7 became Military Intelligence Section 7.

MI7 was organised in a series of sub-sections distinguished by lower-case letters in brackets. The precise duties of these sub-sections varied with time, but may be roughly summarised as follows.

- MI7 (a) – censorship,
- MI7 (b) – foreign and domestic propaganda, including press releases concerning army matters,
- MI7 (c) – translation and (from 1917) regulation of foreign visitors,
- MI7 (d) – foreign press propaganda and review (part of subsection (b) until subsection (d) was formed in late 1916).

Patrick MacGill served in MI7(b) after his recovery from wounds he received in the Battle of Loos in 1915.

Later A. A. Milne, the author of Winnie the Pooh, served in MI7(b) after recovering from wounds sustained at the Battle of the Somme. The Anglo-Irish fantasy writer Lord Dunsany also served with Milne after being wounded in the Easter Rising of 1916; his books Tales of War and Unhappy Far-off Things collect some of the material he wrote during this time.

=== Location ===
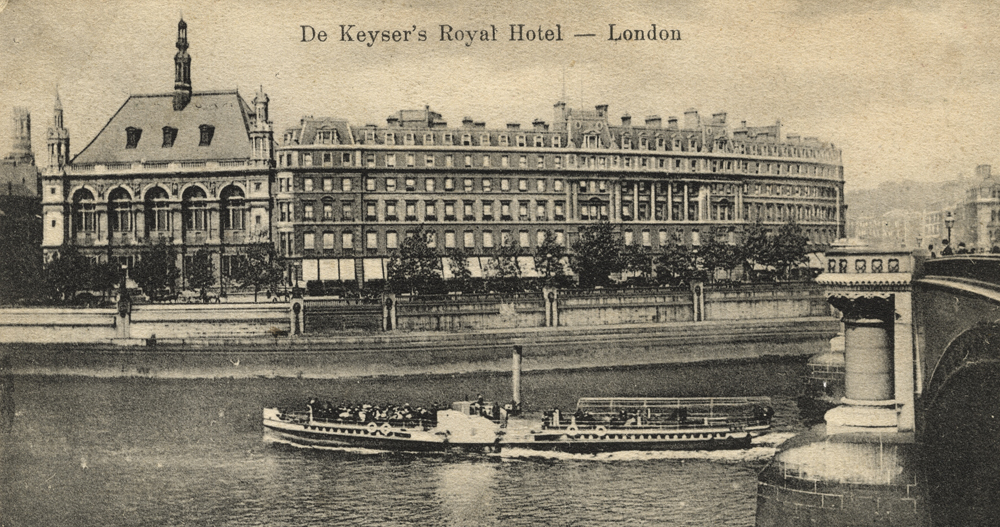
De Keyser's Royal Hotel, later Adastral House and MI7(b)'s headquarters

From April 1916, when it was first established under the direction of Captain Peter Chalmers Mitchell, until early October 1917, most of MI7(b)'s staff worked from Adelphi Court, on the Strand, London, whereupon the whole section moved into Adastral House on the Victoria Embankment. Not to be confused with the later Air Ministry headquarters on Kingsway, the first Adastral House was the former De Keyser's Royal Hotel, located by Blackfriars Bridge. The bankrupt hotel was requisitioned in May 1916 for use as Government offices and was utilised by both the Royal Flying Corps and MI7.

=== Surviving source documents ===
As a branch of military intelligence, paperwork was routinely destroyed to maintain strict security. A further large-scale destruction of papers was organised when MI7 was closed down at the end of WWI. A few important files are scattered amongst War Office, Foreign Office and Ministry of Information records at the British National Archives. Also, some documents from MI7(b) have survived because they were retained by one of its operatives, Lieutenant James Price Lloyd. In 2012, relatives discovered after his death, when his property in Builth Wells, Wales was being sorted and cleared, that he had kept up to 150 files from his time at MI7(b). The archive consisted of two broad categories of articles written between 1917 and 1918 – the "Tales of the VC".

More than 90 stories of individual heroism by men from all over the Empire can be viewed on the National Library of Wales website and on the Europeana 1914–1918 website. Samples of the remaining 60 articles can be found in archives such as "MI7b-the discovery of a lost propaganda archive from the Great War".

== Second World War ==
In September 1939, MI7 was reformed at the outset of the Second World War as the largely civilian Press and Propaganda section of the War Office Directorate of Military Intelligence. It was transferred to the Ministry of Information in around June 1940.

== In fiction ==
The name MI7 has often been used in fiction as the title for an intelligence agency or organization similar to the actual MI5 or MI6.

In the Bond film Dr. No (1962) there are two explicit references to James Bond working for MI6; one of these (where the words are spoken by 'M') has been dubbed to "MI7", although the speaker's lips clearly say "MI6".

In the Operation Susie episode of The Professionals, central organization CI5 comes into conflict with elements of MI7 working to a different agenda.

Rowan Atkinson's character of Johnny English from the spy spoof films Johnny English, Johnny English Reborn and Johnny English Strikes Again is an MI7 agent. The character was originally presented in a series of adverts for Barclaycard as MI7 agent Richard Latham.

In St Trinian's 2: The Legend of Fritton's Gold, former Head Girl Kelly Jones now works as an agent for MI7.

In Chucklevision, Mr Carrington-Smythe (pronounced Smith) is head of MI7 and helps the brothers out in Series 14.

In Christopher Fowler's Bryant and May Detective series, the Peculiar Crimes Unit is placed under the aegis of MI7.
