= Rodney Atkinson =

English political commentator (1948–2026)

- Born: Rodney Eric Bainbridge Atkinson; 21 March 1948; Gosforth, Northumberland, England
- Died: 30 May 2026 (aged 78)
- Education: Newcastle University; Durham University
- Occupations: Commentator and businessman
- Political party: UK Independence Party
- Spouse: Lynn Jennett (m. 2007)
- Relatives: Rowan Atkinson (brother)

Rodney Eric Bainbridge Atkinson (21 March 1948 – 30 May 2026) was an English political and economic commentator and businessman. He was an older brother of comedian and actor Rowan Atkinson.

== Early life and professional career ==
Atkinson was born in Gosforth, Northumberland, England on 21 March 1948. He studied German at Newcastle University (BA Hons with distinction in spoken German) and at Durham University, where he earned an MSc in management studies in 1978 as a member of Collingwood College. He was a lecturer at the University of Mainz from 1971 to 1977, and after that worked as a merchant banker in the City of London with Banque Paribas and Grindlays Bank.

== Politics ==
Atkinson founded the Campaign for United Kingdom Conservatism in 1994 and co-founded, with Lynn Riley, the cross-party South Molton Declaration in 1999 (re-launched as the British Declaration of Independence for the 2005 general election). He founded the Freenations (freenations.net) website in 1997. He was the Referendum Party candidate in North West Durham in the 1997 general election (5.2%) and the lead UK Independence Party (UKIP) candidate for the North East Region in the 1999 European Elections (8.8%).

In 2000, he lost the UKIP leadership election, by 16 votes, to Jeffrey Titford MEP. Atkinson subsequently left UKIP, along with 200 supporters, accusing the then party chairman Nigel Farage MEP and the Eurosceptic journalist Christopher Booker of conducting a "dirty tricks" campaign against him. He also accused the party of being "infiltrated by extremists".

With Norris McWhirter, he laid misprision of treason charges against Francis Maude and Douglas Hurd for signing the Maastricht Treaty. The allegations were dismissed by the Crown Prosecution Service in October 1993, according to a written answer given by the Attorney General, Nicholas Lyell, on 28 October 1993.

== Writing ==
In 1994, Atkinson co-authored the book Treason at Maastricht – the destruction of the Nation State, with Norris McWhirter.

Other work includes the books Government against the People (1985), The Emancipated Society (1988), The Failure of the State (1989), Your country Your Democracy – the Threat from the European Union (1990), Europe's Full Circle (1997), Fascist Europe Rising (2001) and And into the Fire – fascist elements in post war Europe and the Development of the European Union (2013).

== Death ==
He died on 30 May 2026, aged 78.

== Bibliography ==
- "Making Monetarism Work - institutional distortions in the economy", Bow Group Paper, October 1981
- "Overseas Aid by Foreign Trade", Journal of Economic Affairs, January 1982
- "Getting value for Britain's Gas", Bow Group Memorandum, February 1982
- "Incomes Policies do not work", Journal of Economic Affairs, April 1982
- "Prospects for the French Economy", Arab Banker, March 1983
- "No Equity in International Debt", Bow Group Paper, June 1983
- "British Gas Corporation – Sale of Oil Assets", Bow Paper, July 1983
- "How to privatise the Energy Sector", The Times, January 1984
- "How does President Reagan affect the oil price?", Financial Times Energy Economist, March 1984
- "Support that serves only to distort" (Government and Small Business), The Guardian, March 1984
- "Why import Gas?", evidence to House of Commons Select Committee on Energy, Bow Paper, March 1984
- "Turning Points in International Debt", Arab Banker, April 1984
- "Next steps in International Debt", Crossbow, June 1984
- "What has the Closed Shop done for the Unions?", Financial Times, June 1984
- "Aid by Enterprise", (contributor to book), Adam Smith Institute, July 1984
- "Inflation and Middle Class Values", Salisbury Review, October 1984
- "The Politicisation of Banking", Journal of Economic Affairs, April 1985
- "Income Wealth and Capital Taxation", Adam Smith Institute, February 1985
- "Gas Depletion Policy", evidence to House of Commons Select Committee on Energy IIMSO, March 1985
- "A safer road for young nation Debtors", Crossbow, April 1985
- "Edward Heath and the people of Consett", Journal of Economic Affairs. October 1985
- "The Businessman's supply creates the Economists Demand", Salisbury Review, October 1985
- "Why do we still have this "wealth" tax?", Crossbow, Summer 1985
- "The Privatisation of British Gas Corporation", H of C Select Committee on Energy, September 1985
- "The Energy Policy Mess", Bow Paper, November 1985
- "The Sterling Inflation Myth", Crossbow, Summer 1986
- "Economists and the Economy" Book Review. Crossbow 1986
- "A New Approach to Regional Policy", Bow Paper. November 1986
- "Black Economy's Message to Government", Wall Street Journal Europe, 23 January 1987
- "Government guided expenditure", Crossbow, summer 1987
- "A Return to the Regions. A New Prospectus for Regional Policy", Bow Educational Trust, January 1988
- The Moral Basis of Monetarism, Compuprint Publishing, February 1984 ISBN 0-9509353-0-1
- Government Against the People (1986) ISBN 0-9509353-1-X
- The Emancipated Society (1988) ISBN 0-9509353-2-8
- The Failure of the State (1989) ISBN 0-9509353-3-6
- Your Country—Your Democracy (1992) ISBN 0-9509353-5-2
- Treason at Maastricht (1994, with Norris McWhirter, ISBN 0-9509353-9-5
- Europe's Full Circle (1996) ISBN 0-9525110-3-7
- Fascist Europe Rising (2001) ISBN 0-9525110-4-5
- "The South Molton Declaration", The Lantern, January 2001
- "The Democratic and legal Rights of the British people", speech, Leicester, 15 March 2001
- Interview for the Bulgarian journal NIE, vol 6, June 2002
- "German Europe and the nation State'", speech to Polish Slav Committee, Warsaw, Poland, October 2002
- "Corporatism and the end of traditional capitalism", UK Conservatism website, 16 May 2002
- "Who are the real Fascists in Europe?", Freedom Today, March 2003
- "Germany, Iraq and the European Union", The Philadelphia Trumpet, May 2003
- "Obituary" contribution for Norris McWhirter, Times Online, 30 April 2004
- "Bean Blackadder and the European Union", The Salisbury Review, December 2004
- "The Tories, Choice and the Health Service", UK Conservatism website, June 2004
- "Essay in response to a review of Fascist Europe Rising", The South Slav Journal, summer 2005
- "The British Declaration of Independence", Right Now!, March 2006
- "Fascist Europe Rising", speech to autumn conference Protestant Reformation Society, August 2006
- "This Town just isn't big enough. The Landlord and Tenant Act 1954", Estate's Gazette, January 2007
- "Short appreciation of Sir Alfred Sherman", Byronica, September 2007
- "Totalitarians who founded the European Union", speech at public meeting, Houses of Parliament, 26 February 2008
- "The Road to Northern Rock", The Salisbury Review, spring 2008
- "The Global Financial Disaster", The Salisbury Review, autumn 2008
- "The Separation of Lending Banks from Investment Banks – the Case for Glass Steagall type legislation'", evidence to the Inquiry into Banking Reform by the House of Commons Treasury Select Committee
- "Lending Banks and Investment Banks", evidence to the Independent Banking Commission chaired by Sir John Vickers.
- "Edmund Burke by Dennis O'Keeffe", book review. Economic Affairs, June 2011
- "What is Fascism?", British Church newspaper, August 2011
- "German Dominance in Europe'", Eurofacts, 16 December 2011
- "Constitutional Losses and Repatriating Powers from the EU", address to The Lords and Commons Better Off Out Group, 18 January 2012
- "British and American Corporatism destroy democracy", Eurofacts, August 2012
- And into the Fire - fascist elements in post war Europe and the development of the European Union (2013) GM Books, Los Angeles, Hong Kong ISBN 9781882383-34-4
- "The Emancipated Society" and "The Fascist Origins of the EU", two lectures at the University of Krasnodar, Russia, February 2016
- "Brexit: "Necessary for Saving democracy in Europe and stopping war", Russia Today, 3 June 2016
- "May's Irish Myth blows up Brexit", British Church newspaper, 22 December 2017
- "Can the UK learn from Russia?", Eurofacts, 9 February 2018
- "Germany profits as Greece collapses", Eurofacts, 15 June 2018
- "The First Marxist Conservative Government in History", UKIPDaily, 4 parts 13–19 June 2018
- "IMF (again) makes a fool of itself over Brexit", Eurofacts, 19 October 2018
- "Theresa May's Brexit Surrender", Eurofacts, 14 December 2018
- "The Benefits of a true Brexit", British Church newspaper, 15 March 2019

Recordings on CD:

- Sir Alfred Sherman 2007 ISBN 0-9525110-7-X
- The British Declaration of Independence 2008 ISBN 0-9525110-6-1
- The Nazis and Fascists who founded the European Union and their influence today. 2008 ISBN 0-9525110-5-3

Pamphlets

- "The Euro—What it really means"
- "15 Lies from the European Movement"
- "EU Propaganda in British Schools"
- "British Eurofederalists"
- "Yugoslavia and its enemies"
