= Rowan Atkinson =

English actor, comedian, and writer (born 1955)

Rowan Atkinson CBE
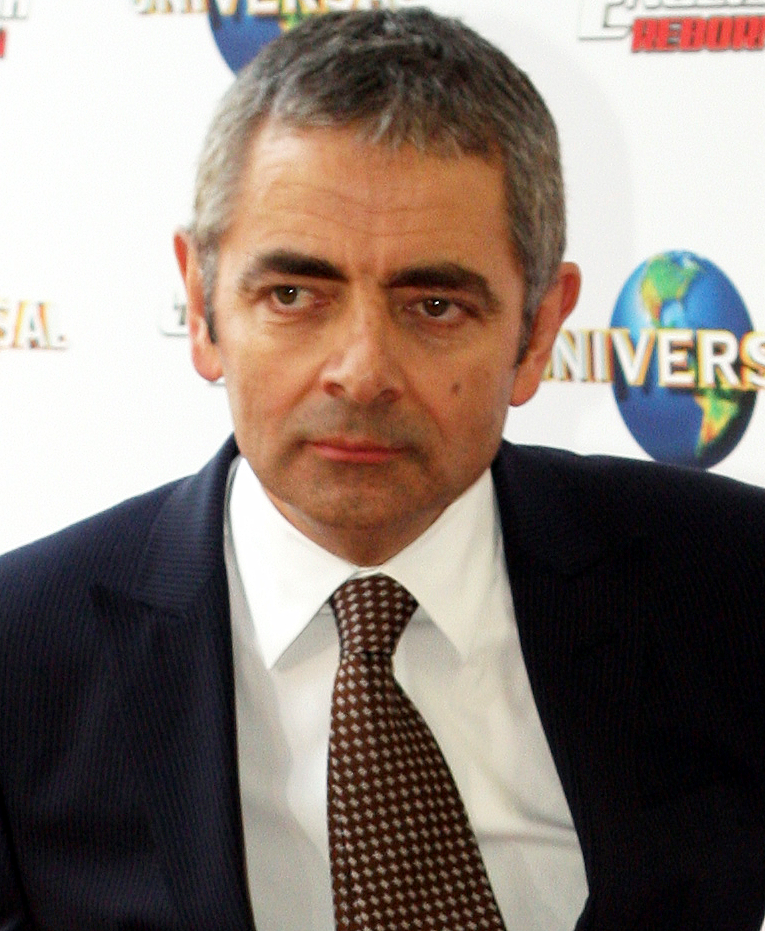
- Atkinson in 2011
- Born: Rowan Sebastian Atkinson; 6 January 1955 (age 71); Consett, England or Gosforth, England
- Education: Newcastle University (BSc); Queen's College, Oxford (MSc)
- Notable work: Not the Nine O'Clock News; Blackadder; Mr. Bean; The Thin Blue Line; Johnny English; Man vs. Bee & Man vs. Baby
- Spouse: Sunetra Sastry (m. 1990; div. 2015)
- Partner: Louise Ford (2014–present)
- Children: 3
- Relatives: Rodney Atkinson (brother)

Comedy career
- Years active: 1978–present
- Medium: Television; film; stand-up
- Rowan Atkinson's voice from the BBC programme Front Row Interviews, 8 January 2012

Rowan Sebastian Atkinson (born 6 January 1955) is an English actor, comedian, and writer. He first gained success on the sketch comedy show Not the Nine O'Clock News (1979–1982), before going on to play the title roles in the sitcoms Blackadder (1983–1989) and Mr. Bean (1990–1995), the latter of which earned him international fame. He also portrayed the titular character in the film series Johnny English (2003–present). He reprised the Mr. Bean character in the films Bean (1997) and Mr. Bean's Holiday (2007), and voices the character in Mr. Bean: The Animated Series (2002–present).

Atkinson's other film appearances include the James Bond film Never Say Never Again (1983), The Witches (1990), Four Weddings and a Funeral (1994), Rat Race (2001), Scooby-Doo (2002), Love Actually (2003), and Wonka (2023), as well as voicing the character Zazu in the Disney animated film The Lion King (1994). He also starred as Inspector Raymond Fowler in the BBC sitcom The Thin Blue Line (1995–1996), French police commissioner Jules Maigret in ITV's Maigret (2016–2017), and Trevor Bingley in the Netflix sitcoms Man vs. Bee (2022) and Man vs. Baby (2025).

Throughout his career, he has frequently collaborated with screenwriter Richard Curtis and composer Howard Goodall, both of whom he met at the Oxford University Dramatic Society during the 1970s. Atkinson's work in theatre includes the role of Fagin in the 2009 West End revival of the musical Oliver!.

In 2003, The Observer listed Atkinson as one of the 50 funniest actors in British comedy, and among the top 50 comedians ever in a 2005 poll of fellow comedians. Atkinson received the British Academy Television Award for Best Entertainment Performance in 1981, for his work in Not the Nine O'Clock News, and again in 1990, for his work in Blackadder, as well as an Olivier Award for his 1981 West End theatre performance in Rowan Atkinson in Revue. Atkinson was appointed CBE in the 2013 Birthday Honours for services to drama and charity.

== Early life ==
Atkinson was born in Consett, County Durham, or Gosforth, Newcastle upon Tyne, Northumberland, England, (Note: His birth was registered in Quarter 1, 1955 in Newcastle upon Tyne.) on 6 January 1955. The youngest of four boys, his parents were Eric Atkinson, a farmer and company director, and Ella May (née Bainbridge), who married on 29 June 1945. His three older brothers are Paul, who died as an infant; Rodney, a Eurosceptic economist who narrowly lost the UK Independence Party leadership election in 2000; and Rupert.

Atkinson was brought up Anglican. He was educated at the Durham Chorister School, a preparatory school, and then at St Bees School. Rodney, Rowan and their older brother Rupert were brought up in Consett and went to school with the future Prime Minister, Tony Blair, at Durham Choristers. After receiving top grades in science A levels, he secured a place at Newcastle University, where he received a BSc degree in Electrical and Electronic Engineering in 1975. Atkinson briefly embarked on a PhD study at The Queen's College, Oxford, where his father had studied in 1935, before devoting his full attention to acting. He graduated with an MSc degree in Electrical Engineering and was made an Honorary Fellow of the college in 2006. His master's thesis, published in 1978, considered the application of self-tuning control.

Atkinson first won national attention in The Oxford Revue at the Edinburgh Festival Fringe in August 1976. He had already written and performed sketches for shows in Oxford by the Etceteras – the revue group of the Experimental Theatre Club (ETC) – and for the Oxford University Dramatic Society (OUDS), meeting writer Richard Curtis, and composer Howard Goodall, with whom he would continue to collaborate during his career.

== Career ==
=== Radio ===
Atkinson starred in a series of comedy shows for BBC Radio 3 in 1979 called The Atkinson People. It consisted of a series of satirical interviews with fictional great men, who were played by Atkinson himself. The series was written by Atkinson and Richard Curtis, and produced by Griff Rhys Jones.

=== Television ===
After university, Atkinson did a one-off pilot for London Weekend Television in 1979 called Canned Laughter. He gained further national attention when he performed on the third The Secret Policeman's Ball in June 1979 which was broadcast on the BBC, and since then he has appeared on televised skits with various performers including Elton John, John Cleese ("Beekeeping") and Kate Bush, the latter with whom he performed the humorous song "Do Bears... ?" for the British charity event Comic Relief in 1986. Solo skits on television (and without dialogue) have included playing an invisible drum kit and an invisible piano. In October 1979, Atkinson first appeared on Not the Nine O'Clock News for the BBC, produced by his friend John Lloyd. He featured in the show with Griff Rhys Jones, Mel Smith, and Pamela Stephenson, and he was one of the main sketch writers.

"The main appeal of the series is that of the brilliant comedian Atkinson as the mean-spirited and terminally sarcastic Edmund Blackadder."

— Garry Berman on Atkinson's performance in Blackadder.

The success of Not the Nine O'Clock News led to Atkinson taking the lead role of Edmund Blackadder in the BBC mock-historical comedy Blackadder. His co-stars included Tony Robinson (who played his long-suffering sidekick Baldrick), Tim McInnerny, Stephen Fry and Hugh Laurie. The first series, The Black Adder (1983), co-written by Atkinson and Richard Curtis, was set in the mediæval period, with the title character unintelligent and naïve. The second series, Blackadder II (1986), written by Curtis and Ben Elton, marked a turning point for the show. It followed the fortunes of one of the descendants of Atkinson's original character, this time in the Elizabethan era, with the character reinvented as a devious anti-hero. Two sequels followed, Blackadder the Third (1987), set in the Regency era, and Blackadder Goes Forth (1989), set in World War I. The Blackadder series became one of the most successful of all BBC situation comedies, spawning television specials including Blackadder's Christmas Carol (1988), Blackadder: The Cavalier Years (1988), and later Blackadder: Back & Forth (1999), which was set at the turn of the Millennium. The final scene of Blackadder Goes Forth (when Blackadder and his men go "over the top" and charge into No-Man's-Land) has been described as "bold and highly poignant". Possessing an acerbic wit and armed with numerous quick put-downs (which are often wasted on those at whom they are directed), Edmund Blackadder was ranked third (behind Homer Simpson from The Simpsons and Basil Fawlty from Fawlty Towers) on a 2001 Channel 4 poll of the 100 Greatest TV Characters.

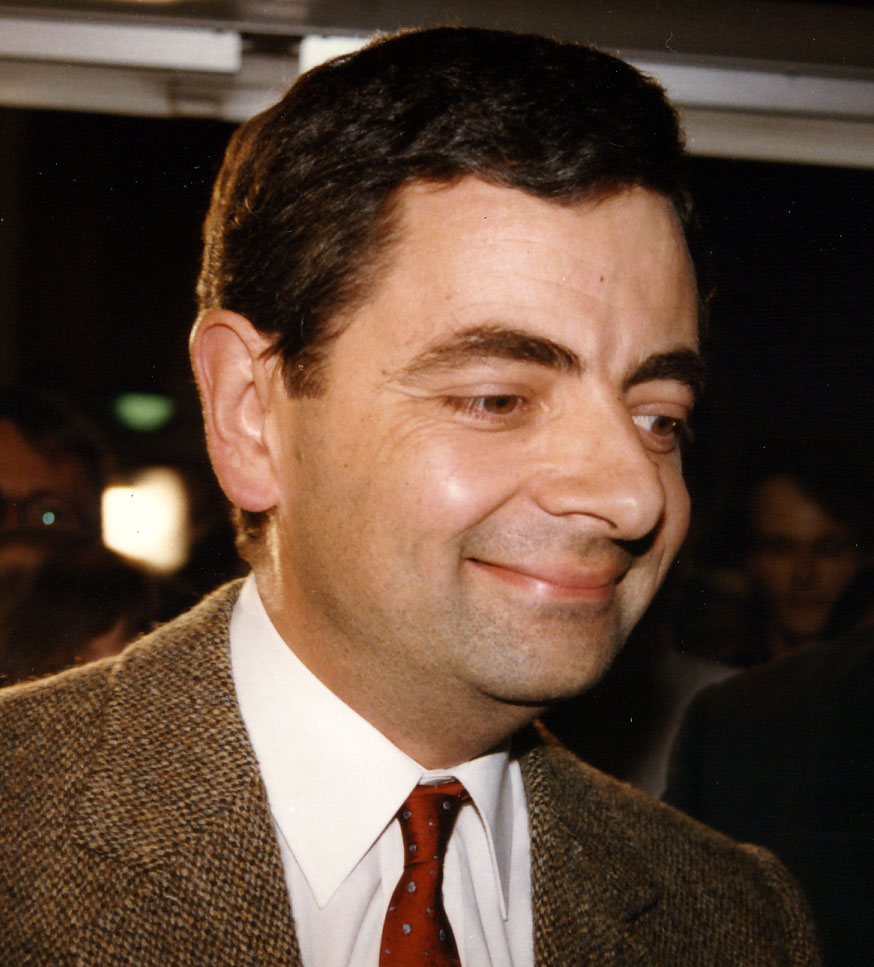
Atkinson in 1997, promoting Bean. In 2014, young adults from abroad named Mr. Bean among a group of people they most associated with British culture.

Atkinson's other creation, the hapless Mr. Bean, first appeared on New Year's Day in 1990 in a half-hour special for Thames Television. The character of Mr. Bean has been likened to a modern-day Buster Keaton, but Atkinson himself has stated that Jacques Tati's character Monsieur Hulot was the main inspiration. Atkinson states, "The essence of Mr Bean is that he's entirely selfish and self-centred and doesn't actually acknowledge the outside world. He's a child in a man's body. Which is what most visual comedians are about: Stan Laurel, Chaplin, Benny Hill".

Several sequels to Mr. Bean appeared on television until 1995, and the character appeared in the film Bean (1997), directed by Mel Smith, Atkinson's colleague in Not the Nine O'Clock News. A second film, Mr. Bean's Holiday, was released in 2007. Atkinson portrayed Inspector Raymond Fowler in The Thin Blue Line (1995–96), a BBC sitcom written by Ben Elton, which takes place in a police station located in fictitious Gasforth. It was ranked number 34 in a poll for Britain's Best Sitcom.

Atkinson has fronted campaigns for Kronenbourg, Fujifilm, and Give Blood. He appeared as a hapless and error-prone espionage agent named Richard Lathum in a long-running series of adverts for Barclaycard, on which character his title role in Johnny English, Johnny English Reborn and Johnny English Strikes Again was based. In 1999, he played the Doctor in The Curse of Fatal Death, a special Doctor Who serial produced for the charity telethon Comic Relief. Atkinson appeared as the Star in a Reasonably Priced Car on the BBC's Top Gear in July 2011, driving the Kia Cee'd around the track in 1:42.2. Placing him at the top of the leaderboard, his lap time was quicker than the previous high-profile record holder Tom Cruise, whose time was a 1:44.2.

Atkinson appeared at the 2012 Summer Olympics opening ceremony in London as Mr. Bean in a comedy sketch during a performance of "Chariots of Fire", playing a repeated single note on synthesizer. He then lapsed into a dream sequence in which he joined the runners from the film of the same name (about the 1924 Summer Olympics), beating them in their iconic run along West Sands at St. Andrews, by riding in a minicab and tripping the front runner. In November 2012, it emerged that Atkinson intended to retire Mr. Bean. "The stuff that has been most commercially successful for me – basically quite physical, quite childish – I increasingly feel I'm going to do a lot less of," Atkinson told The Daily Telegraph's Review. "Apart from the fact that your physical ability starts to decline, I also think someone in their 50s being childlike becomes a little sad. You've got to be careful". He has also said that the role typecast him to a degree. Despite these comments, Atkinson said in 2016 that he would never retire the character of Mr. Bean.

In October 2014, Atkinson also appeared as Mr. Bean in a TV advert for Snickers. In 2015, he starred alongside Ben Miller and Rebecca Front in a sketch for BBC Red Nose Day in which Mr. Bean attends a funeral. In 2017, Atkinson appeared as Mr. Bean in the Chinese film Huan Le Xi Ju Ren. In February 2019, Atkinson appeared as Mr. Bean in a commercial for Emirati-based telecommunications company Etisalat. Atkinson, who also narrated the commercial, takes on multiple characters: a Scottish warrior, a gentleman and a lady from the Victorian era, a football player, a jungle man, a man revving up a chainsaw, a racing car driver, and a masked sword-wielding Spanish vigilante. In 2016, Atkinson starred as Jules Maigret in Maigret, a series of television films from ITV.

In October 2018, Atkinson (as Mr. Bean) received YouTube's Diamond Play Button for his channel surpassing 10 million subscribers on the video platform. Among the most-watched channels in the world, in 2018 it had more than 6.5 billion views. Mr. Bean is also among the most-followed Facebook pages with 94 million followers in July 2020, "more than the likes of Rihanna, Manchester United or Harry Potter".

In January 2014, ITV announced a new animated series featuring Mr. Bean with Rowan Atkinson returning to the role. It was expected to be released online as a Web-series later in 2014, as a television broadcast followed shortly after. On 6 February 2018, Regular Capital announced that there would be a third series of Mr. Bean: The Animated Series in 2019 (voiced by Atkinson). Consisting of 26 episodes, the first two segments, "Game Over" and "Special Delivery", aired on 9 April 2019 on CITV in the UK as well as on Turner channels worldwide. All three series (104 episodes) were also sold to Chinese children's channel CCTV-14 in February 2019.

=== Film ===
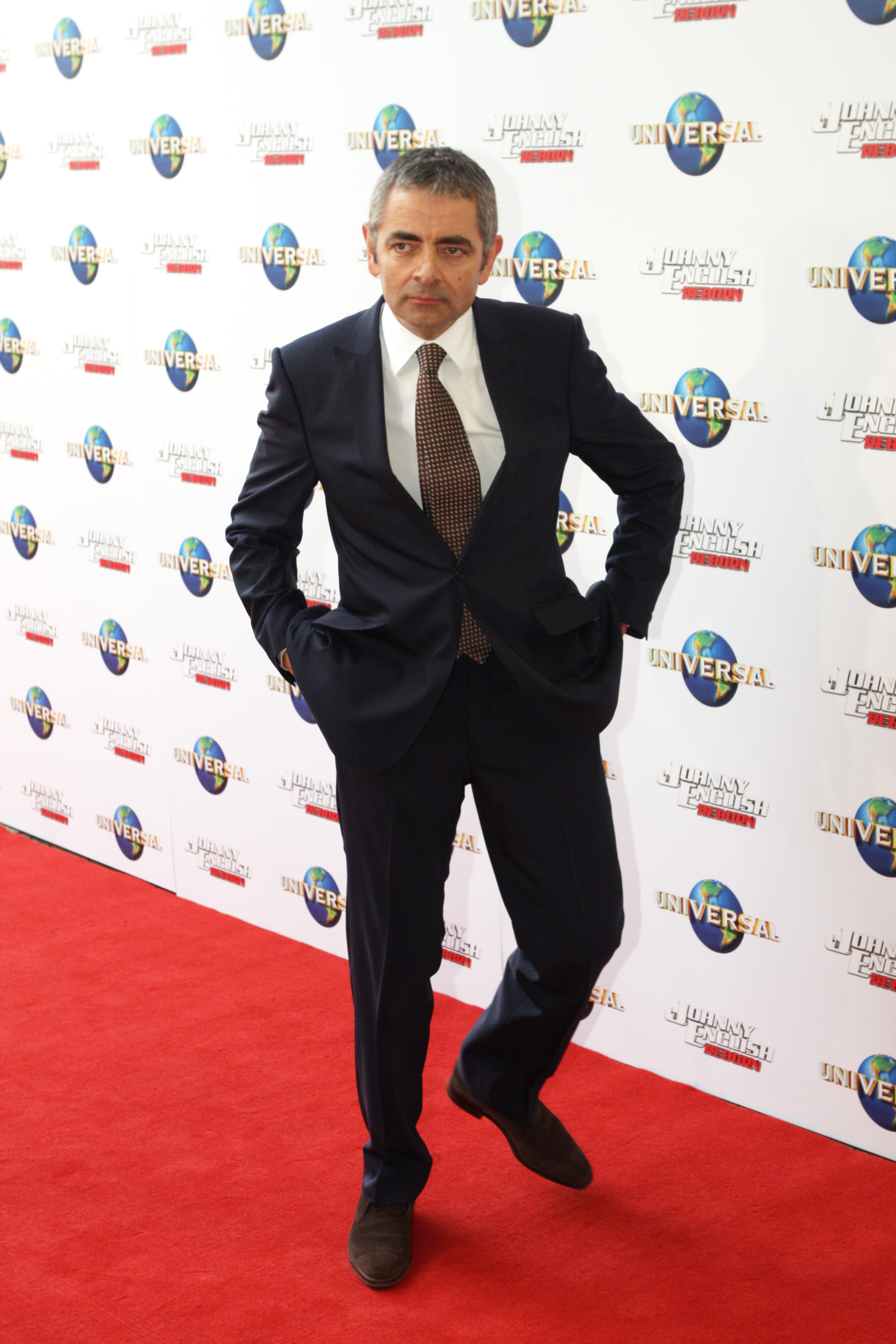
Atkinson at the 2011 premiere of Johnny English Reborn

Atkinson's film career began with a supporting part in the James Bond film Never Say Never Again (1983) and a leading role in Dead on Time (also 1983) with Nigel Hawthorne. He was in the 1988 Oscar-winning short film The Appointments of Dennis Jennings. He appeared in Mel Smith's directorial debut The Tall Guy (1989) and appeared alongside Anjelica Huston and Mai Zetterling in The Witches (1990), a film adaptation of Roald Dahl's dark fantasy children's novel. He played the part of Dexter Hayman in Hot Shots! Part Deux (1993), a parody of Rambo III, starring Charlie Sheen.

Atkinson gained further recognition as a verbally bumbling vicar in Four Weddings and a Funeral (1994, written and directed by his long time collaborator Richard Curtis), and featured in Disney's The Lion King (also 1994) as the voice of Zazu the red-billed hornbill. He also sang the song "I Just Can't Wait to Be King" in The Lion King. Atkinson continued to appear in supporting roles in comedies, including Rat Race (2001), Scooby-Doo (2002), jewellery salesman Rufus in another Richard Curtis British-set romantic comedy, Love Actually (2003), and the crime comedy Keeping Mum (2005), which also starred Kristin Scott Thomas, Maggie Smith, and Patrick Swayze.

In addition to his supporting roles, Atkinson has also had success as a leading man. His television character Mr. Bean debuted on the big screen with Bean (1997) to international success. A sequel, Mr. Bean's Holiday (2007), (again inspired to some extent by Jacques Tati in his film Les Vacances de Monsieur Hulot, best known in English as "Monsieur Hulot's Holiday"), also became an international success. He has also starred in the James Bond parody Johnny English film series (2003–present). In 2023, Atkinson stars as priest Father Julius in Wonka, a film which serves as a prequel to the Roald Dahl novel Charlie and the Chocolate Factory, exploring Willy Wonka's origins. In February 2024, it was announced that he would star in a fourth Johnny English film.

=== Theatre ===
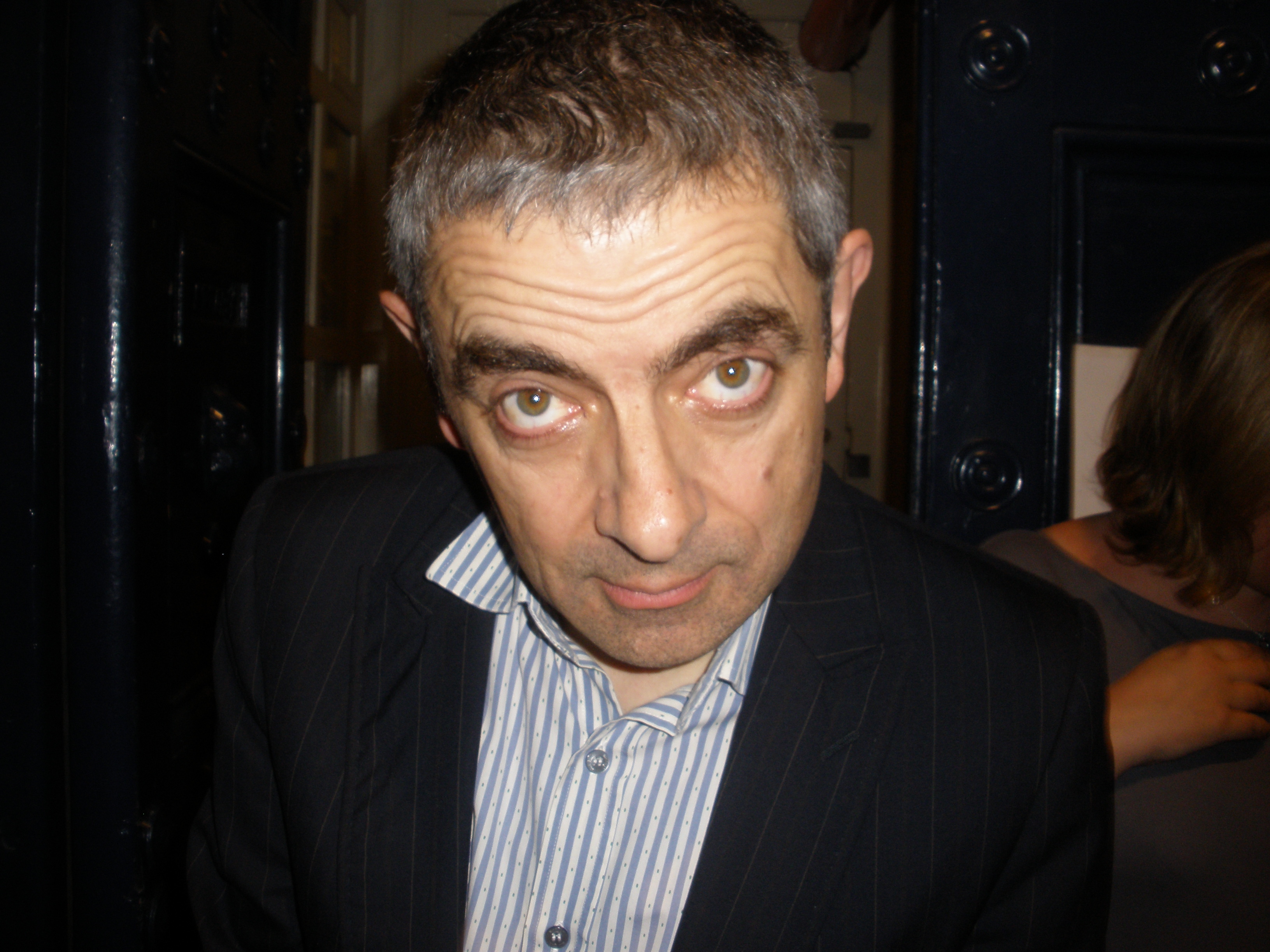
Atkinson outside the West End's Theatre Royal, Drury Lane on 16 June 2009

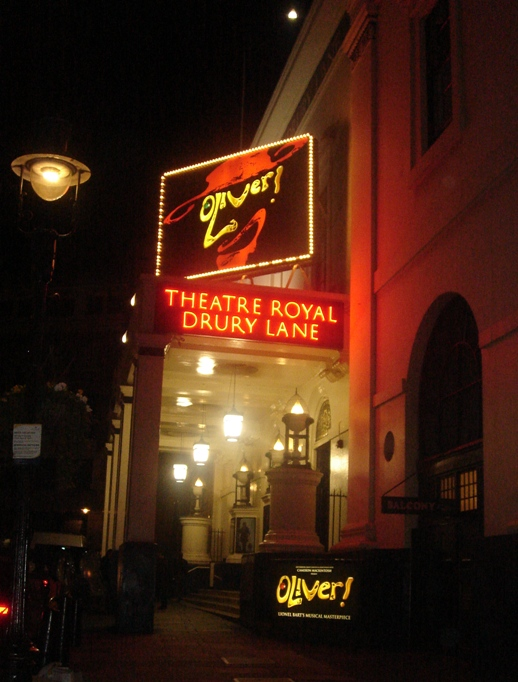
Oliver! billboard at the West End's Drury Lane in 2009. Atkinson was nominated for an Olivier Award for his portrayal of Fagin.

Atkinson performed live on-stage skits – including appearing with members of Monty Python – in The Secret Policeman's Ball (1979) in London for Amnesty International. Atkinson undertook a four-month tour of the UK in 1980. A recording of his stage performance at the Grand Opera House in Belfast was subsequently released as Live in Belfast.

In 1984, Atkinson appeared in a West End version of the comedy play The Nerd alongside a 10-year-old Christian Bale. The Sneeze and Other Stories, seven short Anton Chekhov plays, translated and adapted by Michael Frayn, were performed by Rowan Atkinson, Timothy West and Cheryl Campbell at the Aldwych Theatre, London in 1988 and early 1989.

In 2009, during the West End revival of the musical Oliver! based on Charles Dickens' novel Oliver Twist, Atkinson played the role of Fagin. His portrayal and singing of Fagin at the Theatre Royal, Drury Lane in London gained favourable reviews and he was nominated for an Olivier Award for best actor in a musical or entertainment.

On 28 November 2012, Rowan Atkinson reprised the role of Blackadder at the "We are Most Amused" comedy gala for The Prince's Trust at the Royal Albert Hall in London. He was joined by Tony Robinson as Baldrick. The sketch involved the first new Blackadder material for 10 years, with Blackadder as CEO of Melchett, Melchett and Darling bank facing an enquiry over the banking crisis.

In February 2013, Atkinson took on the titular role in a 12-week production (directed by Richard Eyre) of the Simon Gray play Quartermaine's Terms at Wyndham's Theatre in London with costars Conleth Hill (Game of Thrones) and Felicity Montagu (I'm Alan Partridge). In December 2013, he revived his schoolmaster sketch for Royal Free Hospital's Rocks with Laughter at the Adelphi Theatre. A few days prior, he performed a selection of sketches in a small coffee venue in front of an audience of 30 people.

In October 2026, Atkinson announced Rowan Live, his first West End comedy sketch show in 40 years. The show, scheduled for a 30-performance run at the Gillian Lynne Theatre from February to March 2027, will combine sketches and characters from his earlier work, including Mr Bean and Blackadder. The show will feature new material written with former collaborators Richard Curtis, Ben Elton and Howard Goodall.

== Comic style ==
Best known for his use of physical comedy in his Mr. Bean persona, Atkinson's other characters rely more on language. Atkinson often plays authority figures (especially priests or vicars) speaking absurd lines with a completely deadpan delivery. Journalist Anwar Brett writes, "Although his deadpan wit is in evidence as he speaks, Atkinson – beloved to Blackadder as much as Bean fans – takes his comedy very seriously." On his ability to keep his focus on set during comedic moments, Johnny English director Oliver Parker commented, "There's a scene where Johnny English is in a meeting going up and down on an office chair. Rowan's focus is astonishing in that scene, because everybody else – he hadn't realised – was having to hold back, and when I said 'cut!' there was an explosion of laughter".

Atkinson has a stammer, and has commented that it does not occur as often when he is playing roles versus himself. His visually based style, as opposed to his more verbal style, has been compared to Buster Keaton.

== Influences ==
Atkinson's early comedy influences were the sketch comedy troupe Beyond the Fringe, made up of Peter Cook, Dudley Moore, Jonathan Miller and Alan Bennett, major figures of the 1960s British satire boom, and then Monty Python. Atkinson states, "I remember watching them avidly as students at university". He continued to be influenced by the work of John Cleese following his Monty Python days, regarding Cleese as being "a major, major inspiration", adding, "I think that he and I are quite different in our style and our approach, but certainly it was comedy I liked to watch. He was very physical. Yes, very physical and very angry". He was also influenced by Peter Sellers, whose characters Hrundi Bakshi from The Party (1968) and Inspector Clouseau from The Pink Panther films influenced Atkinson's characters Mr. Bean and Johnny English.

Of Barry Humphries' Dame Edna Everage, he states, "I loved that character – again, it's the veneer of respectability disguising suburban prejudice of a really quite vicious and dismissive nature". Of visual comedians, Atkinson regards Charlie Chaplin, Buster Keaton and Harold Lloyd as influential. He was also inspired by French comedian Jacques Tati, stating, "Mr. Hulot's Holiday I remember seeing when I was 17 – that was a major inspiration. He opened a window to a world that I'd never looked out on before, and I thought, "God, that's interesting," how a comic situation can be developed as purely visual and yet it's not under-cranked, it's not speeded-up, it's more deliberate; it takes its time. And I enjoyed that".

== Personal life ==
=== Marriage and children ===
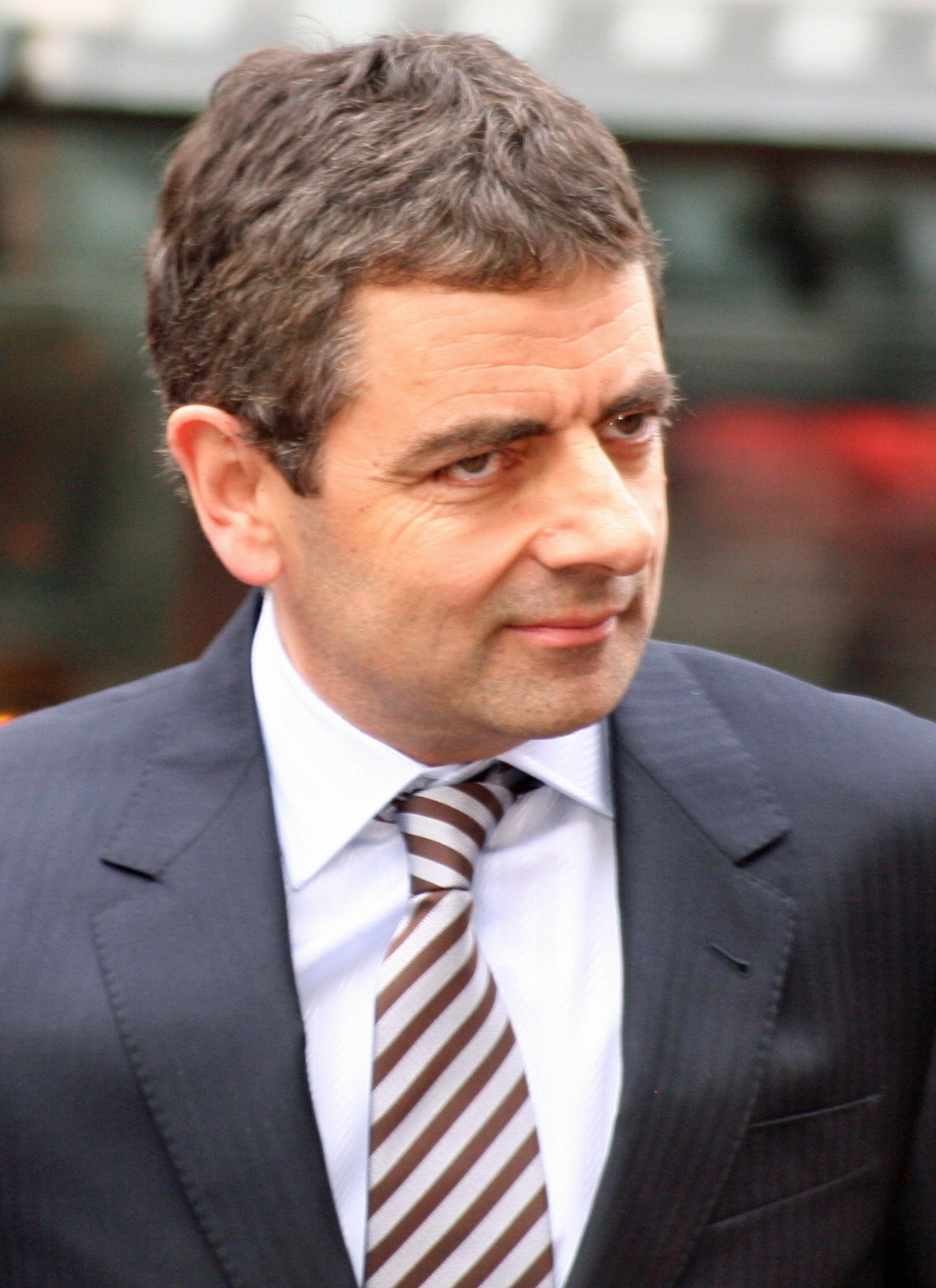
Rowan Atkinson at the Mr. Bean's Holiday premiere at Leicester Square in London (2007)

Atkinson met makeup artist Sunetra Sastry in the late 1980s when she was working for the BBC, and they married in February 1990. They had two children together, and lived in Apethorpe. His son Ben was an army officer in the Brigade of Gurkhas. In 2013, at the age of 58, Atkinson began a relationship with 32-year-old comedian Louise Ford after they met while performing in a play together. Ford ended her relationship with comedian James Acaster in order to be with Atkinson, who in turn separated from his wife in 2014 and divorced her in 2015. He has one child with Ford.

=== Cars ===
Atkinson holds a category C+E (formerly "Class 1") lorry driving licence, gained in 1981, because lorries held a fascination for him, and to ensure employment as a young actor. He has also used this skill when filming comedy material. In 1991, he starred in the self-penned The Driven Man, a series of sketches featuring Atkinson driving around London trying to solve his obsession with cars, and discussing it with taxi drivers, policemen, used-car salesmen and psychotherapists. A lover of and participant in car racing, he appeared as racing driver Henry Birkin in the television play Full Throttle in 1995.

From 1997 to 2015, Atkinson owned a rare McLaren F1, which was involved in an accident in Cabus, near Garstang, Lancashire, with an Austin Metro in October 1999. It was damaged again in a serious crash in August 2011 when it caught fire after Atkinson reportedly lost control and hit a tree. That accident caused significant damage to the vehicle, taking over a year to be repaired and leading to the largest insurance payout in Britain, at £910,000. He has previously owned a Honda NSX, an Audi A8, a Škoda Superb, and a Honda Civic Hybrid.

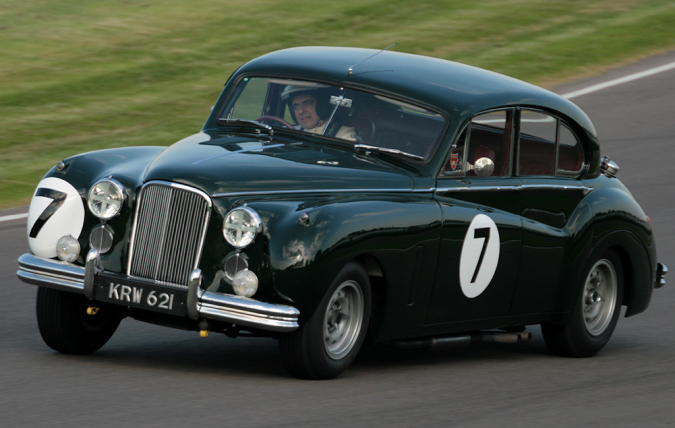
Atkinson racing in a Jaguar Mark VII M at the Goodwood Revival motor racing festival in England in 2009

The Conservative Party politician Alan Clark, a devotee of classic motor cars, recorded in his published Diaries a chance meeting with a man he later realised was Atkinson while driving through Oxfordshire in May 1984: "Just after leaving the motorway at Thame I noticed a dark red DBS V8 Aston Martin on the slip road with the bonnet up, a man unhappily bending over it. I told Jane to pull in and walked back. A DV8 in trouble is always good for a gloat." Clark writes that he gave Atkinson a lift in his Rolls-Royce to the nearest telephone box, but was disappointed in his bland reaction to being recognised, noting that "he didn't sparkle, was rather disappointing and chétif".

In July 2001, Atkinson crashed an Aston Martin V8 Zagato at an enthusiasts' meeting, but walked away unhurt. This was while he was competing in the Aston Martin Owners Club event, at the Croft Racing Circuit, Darlington.

One car Atkinson has said he will not own is a Porsche: "I have a problem with Porsches. They're wonderful cars, but I know I could never live with one. Somehow, the typical Porsche people – and I wish them no ill – are not, I feel, my kind of people."

In July 2011, Atkinson appeared as the "Star in a Reasonably Priced Car" on Top Gear, driving the Kia Cee'd around the track in 1:42.2, which at the time granted him first place on the leaderboard; subsequently, only Matt LeBlanc set a faster time.

A February 2024 report by the House of Lords partly blamed Atkinson for poor sales of electric cars in the UK by "damaging" the public's perception of the vehicles. The report criticised a June 2023 opinion piece by Atkinson in The Guardian, who as an early adopter of electric vehicles, described EVs as "fast, quiet and, until recently, very cheap to run", but burdened by battery issues and misleading beliefs on their impact on the environment.

=== Plane incident ===
In March 2001, while Atkinson was on holiday in Kenya, the pilot of his private Cessna fainted; Atkinson managed to maintain the plane's flight and aid the pilot awake, after which the pilot was able to land the plane at Wilson Airport in Nairobi.

=== Political views ===
In June 2005, Atkinson led a coalition of the United Kingdom's most prominent actors and writers, including Nicholas Hytner, Stephen Fry, and Ian McEwan, to the British Parliament in an attempt to force a review of the Racial and Religious Hatred Bill, which they felt would give overwhelming power to religious groups to impose censorship on the arts.

In 2009, he criticised homophobic speech legislation, saying that the House of Lords must vote against a government attempt to remove a free-speech clause in an anti–gay hate law. Atkinson opposed the Serious Organised Crime and Police Act 2005 to outlaw inciting religious hatred, arguing that, "freedom to criticise ideas – any ideas even if they are sincerely held beliefs – is one of the fundamental freedoms of society. And the law which attempts to say you can criticise or ridicule ideas as long as they are not religious ideas is a very peculiar law indeed."

In October 2012, he voiced his support for the Reform Section 5 campaign, which aims to reform or repeal Section 5 of the Public Order Act 1986, particularly its statement that an insult can be grounds for arrest and punishment. It is a reaction to several recent high-profile arrests, which Atkinson sees as a restriction of freedom of expression. In February 2014, Parliament passed a redaction of the statute which removed the word "insulting" following pressure from citizens.

In 2018, Atkinson defended comments made by Boris Johnson over wearing the burqa, which were criticised as Islamophobic, and for which Johnson later apologised. Atkinson wrote to The Times stating, "as a lifelong beneficiary of the freedom to make jokes about religion, I do think that Boris Johnson's joke about wearers of the burka resembling letterboxes is a pretty good one." Atkinson's remarks were condemned by some former colleagues and fans.

In August 2020, Atkinson added his signature to a letter coordinated by Humanist Society Scotland along with twenty other public figures including novelist Val McDermid, playwright Alan Bissett, and activist Peter Tatchell, which expressed concern about the Scottish National Party's proposed Hate Crime and Public Order Bills. The letter argued the bill would "risk stifling freedom of expression".

In January 2021, Atkinson criticised the rise of cancel culture. He said, "It's important that we're exposed to a wide spectrum of opinion, but what we have now is the digital equivalent of the medieval mob, roaming the streets looking for someone to burn. The problem we have online is that an algorithm decides what we want to see, which ends up creating a simplistic, binary view of society. It becomes a case of either you're with us or against us. And if you're against us, you deserve to be 'cancelled'."

== Filmography ==
- 1979–1982: Not the Nine O'Clock News
- 1983–1989: Blackadder
- 1983: Never Say Never Again
- 1988: The Appointments of Dennis Jennings
- 1989: The Tall Guy
- 1990–1995: Mr. Bean
- 1990: The Witches
- 1993: Hot Shots! Part Deux
- 1994: Four Weddings and a Funeral
- 1994: The Lion King
- 1995: Full Throttle
- 1995–1996: The Thin Blue Line
- 1997: Bean
- 2000: Maybe Baby
- 2001: Rat Race
- 2002–2004, 2015–2016, 2018–2019, 2025–present: Mr. Bean: The Animated Series
- 2002: Scooby-Doo
- 2003: Johnny English
- 2003: Love Actually
- 2005: Keeping Mum
- 2007: Mr. Bean's Holiday
- 2011: Johnny English Reborn
- 2016–2017: Maigret
- 2017: Top Funny Comedian: The Movie (original title: Huan Le Xi Ju Ren)
- 2018: Johnny English Strikes Again
- 2022: Man vs Bee
- 2023: Wonka
- 2025: Man vs Baby

== Stage ==
Year	Title	Role	Notes
1981	Rowan Atkinson in Revue	Various roles Also writer	Globe Theatre
	Rowan Atkinson in New Revue	Various roles	
1984	The Nerd	Willum Cubbert	Aldwych Theatre
1986	Rowan Atkinson at the Atkinson	Various roles Also writer	Brooks Atkinson Theatre
1988	The Sneeze	Various roles	Aldwych Theatre
2009	Oliver!	Fagin	Theatre Royal, Drury Lane
2013	Quartermaine's Terms	St. John Quartermaine	Theatre Royal, Brighton; Theatre Royal, Bath; Wyndham's Theatre

== Honours ==
Atkinson was appointed Commander of the Order of the British Empire in the 2013 Birthday Honours for his contribution to drama and charity.

== Awards and nominations ==
Year	Awards	Category	Nominated work	Result	Ref.
1981	Laurence Olivier Awards	Best Comedy Performance	Rowan Atkinson in Revue	Won	
1981	British Academy Television Awards	Best Light Entertainment Performance	Not the Nine O'Clock News	Won	
1983	British Academy Television Awards	Best Light Entertainment Performance	Not the Nine O'Clock News	Nominated	
1988	British Academy Television Awards	Best Light Entertainment Performance	Blackadder the Third	Nominated	
1990	British Academy Television Awards	Best Light Entertainment Performance	Blackadder Goes Forth	Won	
1990	Rose d'Or Awards	Golden Rose	Mr. Bean	Won	
1991	British Academy Television Awards	Best Light Entertainment Performance	Mr Bean: The Return of Mr. Bean	Nominated	
1992	British Academy Television Awards	Best Light Entertainment Performance	Mr Bean: The Curse of Mr. Bean	Nominated	
1992	British Academy Television Awards	Best Comedy Programme or Series	Mr Bean: The Curse of Mr. Bean	Nominated	
1993	CableACE Awards	Best Comedy Special	Rowan Atkinson Live	Nominated	
1993	CableACE Awards	Best Writing and Entertainment Special	Rowan Atkinson Live	Won	
1993	CableACE Awards	Best Performance in a Comedy Special	Rowan Atkinson Live	Nominated	
1994	British Academy Television Awards	Best Light Entertainment Performance	Mr. Bean	Nominated	
1994	Aftonbladet TV prize Awards	Best Foreign TV Personality	Himself	Won	
1995	American Comedy Awards	Funniest Supporting Actror in a Motion Picture	Four Weddings and a Funeral	Nominated	
1995	CableACE Awards	Best Performance in a Comedy Special	Merry Christmas Mr. Bean	Nominated	
1995	CableACE Awards	Best Writing in a Comedy Special	Merry Christmas Mr. Bean	Nominated	
1996	Aftonbladet TV prize Awards	Best Foreign TV Personality	Himself	Won	
1997	National Television Awards	Most Popular Comedy Performer	The Thin Blue Line	Nominated	
1998	Aftonbladet TV prize Awards	Best Foreign Tv Personality	Himself	Won	
2001	Telvis Awards	Best Foreign Tv Performer	Himself	Won	
2003	European Film Awards	Best European Actor	Johnny English	Nominated	
2004	Phoenix Film Critics Society Awards	Best Ensemble Acting	Love Actually	Nominated	
2007	AARP Movies for Grownups Awards	Best Love Story	Keeping Mum (shared with Kristin Scott Thomas)	Nominated	
2010	Laurence Olivier Awards	Best Actor in a Musical	Oliver!	Nominated	
2015	Ethnic Multicultural Media Awards UK	Humanitarian Award	Mr Bean: Funeral	Won	
2016	Ethnic Multicultural Media Awards UK	Best Film Actor	Maigret Sets a Trap and Maigret's Dead Man	Won	
2017	Ethnic Multicultural Media Awards UK	Best Film Actor	Maigret: Night at the Crossroads and Maigret in Montmartre	Won	
2018	National Film Awards, UK	Global Contribution to motion picture	Himself	Nominated	
2020	National Film Awards, UK	Global Contribution to motion picture	Himself	Nominated	
2020	Ethnic Multicultural Media Awards UK	Lifetime Achievement	Himself	Won	
