= Tim Bevan =

New Zealand-British film producer (born 1957)

Tim Bevan CBE
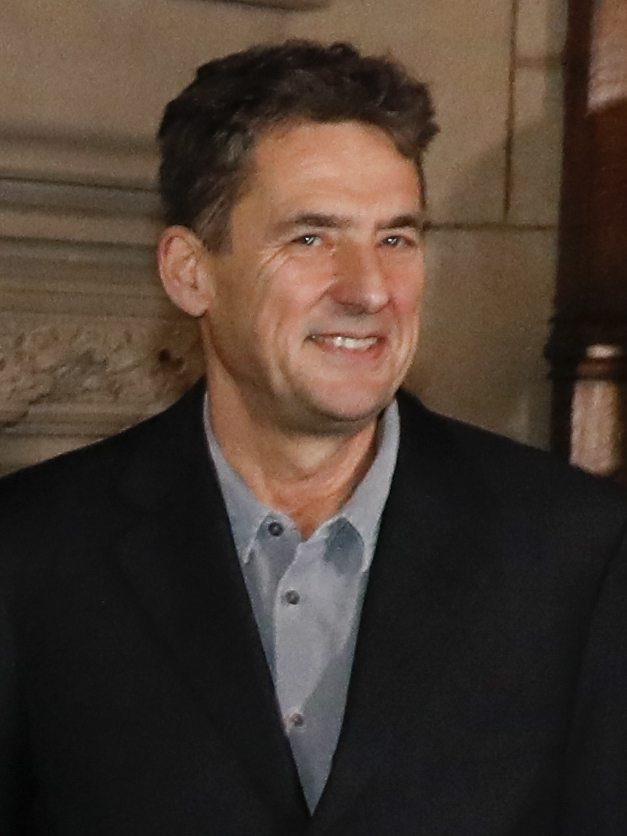
- Bevan in 2019
- Born: Timothy John Bevan; 20 December 1957 (age 68); Queenstown, New Zealand
- Education: Cheltenham College; Sidcot School
- Occupation: Film producer
- Years active: 1984–present
- Spouses: Joely Richardson (m. 1992; div. 2001) Amy Gadney (m. 2001)
- Children: 3, including Daisy

Timothy John Bevan, CBE (born 20 December 1957) is a New Zealand-British film producer, the co-chairman (with Eric Fellner) of the production company Working Title Films. Bevan and Fellner are the most successful British producers of their era. Through 2017, the films he has co-produced have grossed a total of almost $7 billion worldwide. As of 2017, films by Working Title Films have won 12 Academy Awards and 39 British Academy Film Awards.

== Early life and education ==
Bevan was born in 1957 in Queenstown, New Zealand. From 1969 to 1974, he was educated at Sidcot School, a Quaker boarding independent school in the Mendip Hills, near the village of Winscombe in North Somerset, in South West England. He then attended Cheltenham College, a boarding independent school in the spa town of Cheltenham in Gloucestershire, in the West of England.

== Life and career ==
Bevan co-founded Working Title Films in London with Sarah Radclyffe in 1983. Radclyffe left the company in 1991 and Eric Fellner joined to partner Bevan. Among Bevan's more than 40 films as producer or executive producer include Four Weddings and a Funeral (1994), Elizabeth (1998), Notting Hill (1999), Billy Elliot (2000), Bridget Jones's Diary (2001), Love Actually (2003), Atonement (2007), Frost/Nixon (2008), Tinker Tailor Soldier Spy (2011), The Theory of Everything (2014), and Darkest Hour (2017). Working Title are also notable for their long-time collaboration with American filmmakers the Coen brothers, having produced Barton Fink (1991), Fargo (1996), The Hudsucker Proxy (1994), The Big Lebowski (1998), and O Brother, Where Art Thou? among others.

Working Title signed a deal with Universal Studios in 1999 for a reported US$600 million, which gave Bevan and Fellner the authority to commission projects with a budget of up to $35 million without having to consult their investors.

Bevan is a co-producer of the West End musical Billy Elliot.

Bevan was appointed a Commander of the Order of the British Empire (CBE) in the 2005 Birthday Honours for services to the British film industry.

In 2013, he and Fellner received the David O. Selznick Achievement Award in Theatrical Motion Pictures from the Producers Guild of America.

Along with Fellner, Lisa Bryer, David Heyman, Barbara Broccoli and Michael G. Wilson, he founded the London Screen Academy in September 2019, a sixth form school teaching behind the camera skills to a student body of 800.

== Personal life ==
Bevan is divorced from English actress Joely Richardson; the two have a daughter, Daisy, born in 1992. Bevan is now married to Amy Gadney, and they have a daughter and a son.

== Filmography ==
=== Film ===
Producer

- My Beautiful Laundrette (1985)
- Personal Services (1987)
- Sammy and Rosie Get Laid (1987)
- Paperhouse (1988)
- For Queen and Country (1988)
- Diamond Skulls (1989)
- Chicago Joe and the Showgirl (1990)
- Robin Hood (1991) (co-producer)
- London Kills Me (1991)
- Map of the Human Heart (1992)
- French Kiss (1995)
- Moonlight and Valentino (1995)
- Loch Ness (1996)
- Bean (1997)
- The Matchmaker (1997)
- The Borrowers (1997)
- What Rats Won't Do (1998)
- Elizabeth (1998)
- The Hi-Lo Country (1998)
- Plunkett & Macleane (1999)
- High Fidelity (2000)
- Bridget Jones's Diary (2001)
- Captain Corelli's Mandolin (2001)
- 40 Days and 40 Nights (2002)
- Ali G Indahouse (2002)
- About a Boy (2002)
- The Guru (2002)
- Johnny English (2003)
- Love Actually (2003)
- The Calcium Kid (2004)
- Thunderbirds (2004)
- Wimbledon (2004)
- Bridget Jones: The Edge of Reason (2004)
- The Interpreter (2005)
- Pride & Prejudice (2005)
- Nanny McPhee (2005)
- United 93 (2006)
- Catch a Fire (2006)
- Sixty Six (2006)
- Smokin' Aces (2006)
- Hot Fuzz (2007)
- Mr. Bean's Holiday (2007)
- Atonement (2007)
- Elizabeth: The Golden Age (2007)
- Definitely, Maybe (2008)
- Wild Child (2008)
- Frost/Nixon (2008)
- The Boat That Rocked (2009)
- State of Play (2009)
- Green Zone (2009)
- Nanny McPhee and the Big Bang (2009)
- Paul (2011)
- Tinker Tailor Soldier Spy (2011)
- Johnny English Reborn (2011)
- Contraband (2012)
- Big Miracle (2012)
- Anna Karenina (2012)
- Les Misérables (2012)
- I Give It a Year (2013)
- About Time (2013)
- The World's End (2013)
- Closed Circuit (2013)
- The Two Faces of January (2014)
- The Theory of Everything (2014)
- Billy Elliot the Musical Live (2014)
- Trash (2014)
- We Are Your Friends (2015)
- Everest (2015)
- Legend (2015)
- The Danish Girl (2015)
- The Program (2015)
- Hail, Caesar! (2016)
- Bridget Jones's Baby (2016)
- Baby Driver (2017)
- Darkest Hour (2017)
- Victoria & Abdul (2017)
- The Snowman (2017)
- Entebbe (2018)
- King of Thieves (2018)
- Johnny English Strikes Again (2018)
- Mary Queen of Scots (2018)
- The Kid Who Would Be King (2019)
- Yesterday (2019)
- Radioactive (2019)
- Cats (2019)
- Emma (2020)
- The High Note (2020)
- Rebecca (2020)
- Cyrano (2021)
- Last Night in Soho (2021)
- Ticket to Paradise (2022)
- The Swimmers (2022)
- What's Love Got to Do with It? (2022)
- Matilda the Musical (2022)
- Catherine Called Birdy (2022)
- Drive-Away Dolls (2024)
- The Substance (2024)
- Blitz (2024)
- Bridget Jones: Mad About the Boy (2025)
- Honey Don't! (2025)
- Crime 101 (2026)
- The Sheep Detectives (2026)
- Finding Emily (2026)
- Pressure (2026)
- Sense and Sensibility (2026)
- Werwulf (2026)
- Hippie Hippie Shake (Unreleased)

Executive producer

- A World Apart (1988)
- The Tall Guy (1989)
- Fools of Fortune (1990)
- Drop Dead Fred (1991)
- Bob Roberts (1992)
- Posse (1993)
- Romeo Is Bleeding (1993)
- Four Weddings and a Funeral (1994)
- The Hudsucker Proxy (1994)
- That Eye, the Sky (1994)
- Panther (1995)
- Dead Man Walking (1995)
- Fargo (1996)
- The Big Lebowski (1998)
- Notting Hill (1999)
- O Brother, Where Art Thou? (2000)
- The Man Who Cried (2000)
- The Man Who Wasn't There (2001)
- Long Time Dead (2002)
- My Little Eye (2002)
- Thirteen (2003)
- The Shape of Things (2003)
- Ned Kelly (2003)
- The Italian Job (2003)
- Gettin' Square (2003)
- Shaun of the Dead (2004)
- Mickybo and Me (2004)
- Inside I'm Dancing (2004)
- No. 2 (2006)
- Gone (2007)
- Burn After Reading (2008)
- The Soloist (2009)
- A Serious Man (2009)
- Arrietty (2010)
- Rush (2013)
- Genius (2016)
- Grimsby (2016)

As an actor

- Elizabeth (1998) (As the "Handsome Man")

Thanks

- The Land Girls (1998)
- Following (1998)

=== Television ===
Executive producer

Year	Title	Notes
1988	Echoes	
1992	The Borrowers	
1993	Tales of the City	
1998	More Tales of the City	
2001	Further Tales of the City	
2003	About a Boy	Television pilot
2008	Frontline	Documentary
2007−10	The Tudors	
2011	Love Bites	
2011	The Borrowers	Television film
2012	Birdsong	
2012	True Love	
2013	Mary and Martha	Television film
2014	The Secrets	
2014	About a Boy	
2015	You, Me and the Apocalypse	
2015	London Spy	
2013−16	Yonderland	
2017	Gypsy	
2019	The Case Against Adnan Syed	Documentary
2019	Tales of the City	
2020	The Luminaries	
2019−20	Hanna	
2021	We Are Lady Parts	

== Awards and honours ==
- 2005: Commander of the Order of the British Empire (CBE)
- 2013 received the degree of Doctor honoris causa from The University of York
- 2018: Cinematic Production Award of the Royal Photographic Society
