= Eric Fellner =

British film producer

Eric Fellner CBE
- Born: 10 October 1959 (age 67); England
- Education: Cranleigh School, Surrey; Guildhall School of Music and Drama, London
- Occupation: Film producer
- Spouse: Gaby Dellal (divorced)
- Partner: Laura Bailey
- Children: 5

Eric Nigel Fellner, CBE (born 10 October 1959) is a British film producer. He is the co-chairman (along with Tim Bevan) of the production company Working Title Films.

== Early life and education ==
Fellner was born in England. From 1972 to 1977, he was educated at Cranleigh School, a boarding independent school for boys (now co-educational), in Surrey in South East England, followed by the Guildhall School of Music and Drama in London.

== Career ==
Fellner was a film producer at Initial Films and had come to prominence as the producer of Sid and Nancy (1986) and the executive producer of A Kiss Before Dying (1991). Following the departure of Sarah Radclyffe from Working Title Films, he joined to partner Tim Bevan in 1991.

== Recognition ==
- He was awarded the C.B.E. (Commander of the Order of the British Empire) in the 2005 Queen's Birthday Honours List for his services to the British film industry.
- In 2013, he and Bevan received the David O. Selznick Achievement Award in Theatrical Motion Pictures from the Producers Guild of America.
- In 2013, he was Awarded a Career Achievement Award at Zurich Film Festival.
- 2018: Cinematic Production Award of the Royal Photographic Society

== Personal life ==
Fellner has five children, three from his marriage and two with long-time partner, photographer Laura Bailey. They live in London.

== Philanthropy ==
He is the chairman of Into Film, a charity which aims to put film at the heart of children and young people’s educational, cultural and personal development.

In September 2019, along with his business partner Tim Bevan, Lisa Bryer, David Heyman, Barbara Broccoli and Michael Wilson he founded the London Screen Academy, a sixth form school teaching behind the camera skills to a student body of 800.

== Filmography ==
=== Film ===
Producer

- Sid and Nancy (1986)
- Straight to Hell (1987)
- Hidden Agenda (1990)
- Liebestraum (1991)
- Wild West (1992)
- No Worries (1993)
- French Kiss (1995)
- Moonlight and Valentino (1995)
- Loch Ness (1995)
- Bean (1997)
- The Matchmaker (1997)
- The Borrowers (1997)
- What Rats Won't Do (1998)
- Elizabeth (1998)
- The Hi-Lo Country (1998)
- Plunkett & Macleane (1999)
- Bridget Jones's Diary (2001)
- Captain Corelli's Mandolin (2001)
- 40 Days and 40 Nights (2002)
- Ali G Indahouse (2002)
- About a Boy (2002)
- The Guru (2002)
- Johnny English (2003)
- Love Actually (2003)
- The Calcium Kid (2004)
- Thunderbirds (2004)
- Wimbledon (2004)
- Bridget Jones: The Edge of Reason (2004)
- The Interpreter (2005)
- Pride & Prejudice (2005)
- Nanny McPhee (2005)
- United 93 (2006)
- Catch a Fire (2006)
- Sixty Six (2006)
- Smokin' Aces (2006)
- Hot Fuzz (2007)
- Mr. Bean's Holiday (2007)
- Atonement (2007)
- Elizabeth: The Golden Age (2007)
- Definitely, Maybe (2008)
- Wild Child (2008)
- Frost/Nixon (2008)
- The Boat That Rocked (2009)
- State of Play (2009)
- Green Zone (2010)
- Nanny McPhee and the Big Bang (2010)
- Paul (2011)
- Tinker Tailor Soldier Spy (2011)
- Johnny English Reborn (2011)
- Contraband (2012)
- Big Miracle (2012)
- Anna Karenina (2012)
- Les Misérables (2012)
- I Give It a Year (2013)
- About Time (2013)
- The World's End (2013)
- Closed Circuit (2013)
- The Two Faces of January (2014)
- The Theory of Everything (2014)
- Billy Elliot the Musical Live (2014)
- Trash (2014)
- We Are Your Friends (2015)
- Everest (2015)
- Legend (2015)
- The Danish Girl (2015)
- The Program (2015)
- Hail, Caesar! (2016)
- Bridget Jones's Baby (2016)
- Baby Driver (2017)
- Darkest Hour (2017)
- Victoria & Abdul (2017)
- The Snowman (2017)
- Entebbe (2018)
- King of Thieves (2018)
- Johnny English Strikes Again (2018)
- Mary Queen of Scots (2018)
- The Kid Who Would Be King (2019)
- Yesterday (2019)
- Radioactive (2019)
- Cats (2019)
- Emma (2020)
- The High Note (2020)
- Rebecca (2020)
- Cyrano (2021)
- Last Night in Soho (2021)
- Ticket to Paradise (2022)
- The Swimmers (2022)
- What's Love Got to Do with It? (2022)
- Catherine Called Birdy (2022)
- Genie (2023)
- Drive-Away Dolls (2024)
- The Substance (2024)
- Blitz (2024)
- Bridget Jones: Mad About the Boy (2025)
- Honey Don't! (2025)
- Crime 101 (2026)
- The Sheep Detectives (2026)
- Finding Emily (2026)
- Pressure (2026)
- Sense and Sensibility (2026)
- Werwulf (2026)
- Hippie Hippie Shake (unreleased)

Executive producer

- The Rachel Papers (1989)
- A Kiss Before Dying (1991)
- Year of the Gun (1991)
- Posse (1993)
- Romeo Is Bleeding (1993)
- The Hawk (1993)
- Four Weddings and a Funeral (1994)
- The Hudsucker Proxy (1994)
- Panther (1995)
- Dead Man Walking (1995)
- Fargo (1996)
- The Big Lebowski (1998)
- Notting Hill (1999)
- O Brother, Where Art Thou? (2000)
- The Man Who Cried (2000)
- The Man Who Wasn't There (2001)
- Long Time Dead (2002)
- My Little Eye (2002)
- Thirteen (2003)
- The Shape of Things (2003)
- Ned Kelly (2003)
- The Italian Job (2003)
- Gettin' Square (2003)
- Shaun of the Dead (2004)
- Mickybo and Me (2004)
- Inside I'm Dancing (2004)
- No. 2 (2006)
- Gone (2007)
- Burn After Reading (2008)
- The Soloist (2009)
- A Serious Man (2009)
- Arrietty (2010)
- Rush (2013)
- Grimsby (2016)

Thanks

- Following (1998)
- Grand Theft Parsons (2003)
- Outlaw King (2018)

=== Television ===
Executive producer

Year	Title	Notes
1992	Underbelly	
1993	Spender	
2003	About a Boy	Television pilot
2008	Frontline	Documentary
2007−10	The Tudors	
2011	Love Bites	
2011	The Borrowers	Television film
2012	Birdsong	
2012	True Love	
2013	Mary and Martha	Television film; Also associate producer
2014	The Secrets	
2014	About a Boy	
2015	You, Me and the Apocalypse	
2015	London Spy	
2013−16	Yonderland	
2017	Gypsy	
2019	The Case Against Adnan Syed	Documentary
2019	Tales of the City	
2020	The Luminaries	
2019−20	Hanna	
2021	We Are Lady Parts	
2022	Everything I Know About Love	

Producer

- Frankie's House (1992) (Television film)

Thanks

- Independent Lens (2005) (Documentary)
