= The Case Against Adnan Syed =

2019 TV series

- Genre: Documentary; True crime
- Directed by: Amy J. Berg
- Country of origin: United States
- Original language: English
- No. of seasons: 1
- No. of episodes: 5

Production
- Executive producers: Amy J. Berg; Jemima Khan; Henrietta Conrad; Tim Bevan; Eric Fellner; Andrew Stearn; Rabia Chaudry; Sara Bernstein; Nancy Abraham; Lisa Heller; Phil Edgar-Jones; Siobhan Mulholland; Celia Taylor
- Producers: Paul McGuire; Ruchi Mital; Jenna Cedicci; Dana Kuznetzkoff
- Cinematography: Thorsten Thielow
- Editors: Alex Keipper; Amir Mosallaie
- Running time: 56–67 minutes
- Production companies: Working Title Television; Instinct Productions; Disarming Films; HBO Documentary Films

Original release
- Network: HBO
- Release: March 10 – March 31, 2019
- Release: September 18, 2025

The Case Against Adnan Syed is a 2019 true crime docuseries about Adnan Syed's (later vacated, but subsequently reinstated) murder conviction for the killing of Hae Min Lee. It was directed by Amy J. Berg and produced by Working Title Television, among others. The first episode of the four-part series premiered March 10, 2019, on HBO. A follow-up episode premiered on HBO on September 18, 2025.

== Background ==
After the success of Serial season 1, HBO green-lit a documentary series to recap the case along with new information about Syed's appeal process. HBO Documentary Films is in production on a follow-up episode to the series, featuring exclusive access to Syed leading up to and following his release from prison.

The documentary was released in four parts and reviewed the case leading up to Syed's then-current status as of 2018. It is revealed that Syed turned down a plea bargain in 2018 that would have required him to plead guilty in exchange for reducing his sentence. Subsequently, Syed's mother told him that she had leukemia.

A follow-up fifth episode–which began filming in 2021 and originally planned for release in 2023, premiered on September 18, 2025, on HBO.

== Episodes ==
No.	Title	Directed by	Written by	Original release date
1	"Forbidden Love"	Amy J. Berg	Amy J. Berg	March 10, 2019
2	"In Between the Truth"	Amy J. Berg	Amy J. Berg	March 17, 2019
3	"Justice Is Arbitrary"	Amy J. Berg	Amy J. Berg	March 24, 2019
4	"Time Is the Killer"	Amy J. Berg	Amy J. Berg	March 31, 2019
5	"Part Five: The Tree Grew"	Amy J. Berg	Amy J. Berg	September 18, 2025

== Reception ==
On the review aggregation website Rotten Tomatoes, the series holds an approval rating of 81% based on 32 reviews. The website's critical consensus reads, "A worthy Serial supplement that isn't without flaws, The Case Against Adnan Syed fleshes out the life of Hae Min Lee and gives context to in the complicated boon of true crime entertainment." Metacritic, which uses a weighted average, assigned the series a score of 66 out of 100 based on 16 critics, indicating "generally favorable" reviews.

Aja Romano of Vox argued that the docuseries has a "pro-Syed bias" and is "armed with an agenda", though its creators billed it as an objective view of the case.

Serial, the 2014 podcast which first popularized the case, released a follow-up episode detailing the reasons for Syed’s release.

=== Accolades ===
The series was nominated for a 2019 Primetime Emmy Award in Outstanding Writing for a Nonfiction Program for the episode "Forbidden Love". It was also a nominee for Outstanding Achievement in Nonfiction Series for Broadcast by Cinema Eye Honors.
