= Johnny English Reborn =

2011 film by Oliver Parker

- British release poster
- Directed by: Oliver Parker
- Screenplay by: Hamish McColl
- Story by: William Davies
- Based on: Johnny English by: Neal Purvis; & Robert Wade; and William Davies
- Produced by: Tim Bevan; Eric Fellner; Chris Clark
- Starring: Rowan Atkinson; Gillian Anderson; Dominic West; Rosamund Pike; Daniel Kaluuya; Richard Schiff
- Cinematography: Danny Cohen
- Edited by: Guy Bensley
- Music by: Ilan Eshkeri
- Production companies: StudioCanal; Relativity Media; Working Title Films
- Distributed by: Universal Pictures
- Release dates: 7 October 2011 (UK); 21 October 2011 (US)
- Running time: 102 minutes
- Countries: United Kingdom; France; United States
- Language: English
- Budget: $45 million
- Box office: $160.1 million

Johnny English Reborn is a 2011 spy action comedy film directed by Oliver Parker and written by Hamish McColl from a story by William Davies. A sequel to Johnny English (2003) and the second instalment in the Johnny English series, it is a British-French-American venture produced by StudioCanal, Relativity Media and Working Title Films, and distributed by Universal Pictures. The film stars Rowan Atkinson (reprising his role as the title character) alongside Gillian Anderson, Dominic West, Rosamund Pike, Daniel Kaluuya and Richard Schiff as new characters.

Much like its predecessor, the film parodies the James Bond film series and clichés of the spy genre and marks Atkinson and Tim McInnerny's second collaboration after the series Blackadder. Johnny English Reborn was met with mixed reviews but has grossed a total of $160 million worldwide.

The film was released in the United Kingdom on 7 October 2011, and topped the country's box office. It was later released in North America on 21 October 2011. A sequel to the film, Johnny English Strikes Again, was released in October 2018.

== Plot ==
Eight years after the first film, Johnny English has been training at a monastery in Tibet to recover from the shame of a failed mission to protect the newly elected president of Mozambique, which cost him his knighthood. English is called back into service by Pamela "Pegasus" Thornton, (Note: It is strongly implied that she became the new head of MI7 due to the downfall of her predecessor, the first Pegasus (played by Tim Pigott-Smith), who is said to have fallen from grace for allegedly collaborating (even if indirectly) with Pascal Sauvage (played by John Malkovich), the main antagonist of the first film, to overthrow Queen Elizabeth II.) MI7’s new director, to investigate an assassination plot of the Chinese premier during talks with the prime minister of the United Kingdom. He meets fellow agent Simon Ambrose, MI7's quartermaster Patch Quartermain, and junior agent Colin Tucker, his assigned assistant.

In Hong Kong, English finds former CIA agent Titus Fisher, who explains that he is a member of Vortex, the group responsible for sabotaging the Mozambique mission. Vortex holds a secret weapon unlocked by three keys, held by himself and two others. Fisher is killed by an elderly female assassin disguised as a cleaner, and an accomplice steals his key. English recovers the key, but it is stolen back by a second accomplice, disguised as a flight attendant, en route to London. He is humiliated in a meeting with the Foreign Secretary and Pegasus when he attempts to present the key and conspiracy. He compounds his disgrace by attacking Pegasus's mother at a children's party, mistaking her for the Killer Cleaner.

Kate Sumner, MI7's behavioural psychologist, uses hypnosis to help English recall his suppressed memory of the Mozambique incident, seeing another Vortex operative, former Russian KGB and renegade MI7 associate spy Artem Karlenko, who is posing as millionaire Sergei Pudovkin. English and Tucker meet Karlenko at a golf course outside London, but the Killer Cleaner critically injures him during their game. English and Tucker take Karlenko to a hospital by helicopter, but he dies after revealing the third key is held by a mole in MI7.

Over dinner, English confides with Ambrose about the mole, who tells him that he suspects Quartermain. Tucker arrives and confronts Ambrose about him being the traitor, but English naively dismisses him, letting Ambrose have Karlenko's key. English confronts Quartermain at a church, but realises that he has been framed as the third Vortex member. Chased by MI7 agents, English manages to escape to Sumner's flat, using Quartermain's heavily modified wheelchair.

While reviewing the Mozambique mission footage, Sumner sees the assassin was manipulated by a supposedly-destroyed mind control drug called Timoxeline Barbebutenol. Ambrose comes to pick her up, and English realises he is the mole and the third member of Vortex. After evading the Killer Cleaner by jumping down a rubbish chute, English goes to Tucker's flat and apologises. He persuades him to join in infiltrating Le Bastion, a nigh-impregnable fortress in the Swiss Alps where the talks are taking place. There, English accidentally activates a distress beacon, alerting the guards to their presence. He commands Tucker to knock him out and put him inside a body bag, so that they will be taken inside. English escapes the bag and warns Pegasus of the threat, but accidentally consumes a drink spiked with the drug, and subdues Pegasus on Ambrose's command.

Assigning English as the prime minister's bodyguard in Pegasus' place, Ambrose orders him to assassinate the Chinese premier using a pistol disguised as lipstick, initially designed for Pegasus. Using his monastic training, English tries to resist the drug. Tucker interrupts Ambrose's communication feed with music before Ambrose resets it, exposing himself as the traitor. English resists again and shoots Ambrose, who escapes. The drug enters its lethal stage and English loses consciousness, but Sumner arrives and revives him with a passionate kiss. He pursues Ambrose down the mountainside, and they fight in a cable car. English overpowers Ambrose, but falls out of the carriage. Ambrose shoots at him, who tries to use his spy umbrella as a bulletproof shield, which is actually a missile launcher when he closes it, and the missile destroys the carriage.

English has his knighthood reinstated by Her Majesty the Queen. During the ceremony the Killer Cleaner, disguised as the Queen, attacks English with the knighting sword and flees. English ends up restraining the real Queen, much to his shock and realising his mistake when the Killer Cleaner is caught by the royal guards.

During the credits, English prepares dinner for Sumner to the tune of "In the Hall of the Mountain King".

== Cast ==
- Rowan Atkinson as Johnny English, an accident prone but good hearted MI7 agent.
- Gillian Anderson as Pamela "Pegasus" Thornton, the head of MI7. (Note: She is the only "Pegasus" (codename given to the head of MI7) whose real name is known, since both her predecessor (played by Tim Pigott-Smith in Johnny English) and her successor (played by Adam James in Johnny English Strikes Again) never had their real names revealed.)
- Dominic West as Simon Ambrose, MI7 agent No. 1, and an old friend of English.
- Rosamund Pike as Katherine "Kate" Sumner, the behavioural psychologist at MI7, and English's love interest. Pike previously portrayed Miranda Frost in the James Bond film Die Another Day.
- Daniel Kaluuya as Colin Tucker, an MI7 agent who becomes English's assistant in his mission.
- Richard Schiff as Titus Fisher, an ex-CIA operative.
- Tim McInnerny as Patch Quartermain, MI7's wheelchair-using quartermaster.
- Pik-Sen Lim as the Killer Cleaner, a Vortex assassin disguised as a grey-haired house cleaner.
- Stephen Campbell Moore as the prime minister of the United Kingdom.
- Burn Gorman as Slater, an MI7 intelligence expert who works with Ambrose.
- Togo Igawa as Ting Wang, English's mentor in Tibet and an MI7 sleeper agent.
- Mark Ivanir as Artem Karlenko, a former Russian KGB double agent.
- Lobo Chan as Xiang Ping, the premier of China.
- Benedict Wong as Chi Han Ly, a corrupt Chinese official conspiring with Simon to take out Xiang Ping
- Joséphine de La Baume as Madeleine, a deceivingly charming member of Vortex, responsible for luring English off his post in Mozambique.
- Williams Belle as Ling, a traceur henchman working for Vortex, who works with the killer cleaner.
- Isabella Blake-Thomas as Izzie, Pegasus' daughter.

Other actors in the film include Wale Ojo as Mozambician President Chambal, Chris Jarman as Michael Tembe, Siu Hun Li as "Chinese Susan", a Vortex henchman who inadvertently impersonates a female flight attendant; Christina Chong as flight attendant Barbara, Paul Che and Courtney Wu as Chinese men in spectacles, Ellen Thomas as Tucker's mother, and Ian Shaw as MI7 Agent No. 2.

Additionally, Rupert Vansittart, who had previously appeared with Atkinson in several episodes of Mr. Bean, appears as rich yacht owner Derek and Isla Blair plays his wife Shirley. Miles Jupp cameos as a technician in Patch's lab. Atkinson's daughter Lily Atkinson has a cameo appearance in the film as the girl who gets her helmet stolen by English. Ben Miller reprised his role of Jeremy Bough from the previous film in one scene, but was cut from the final film.

== Production ==
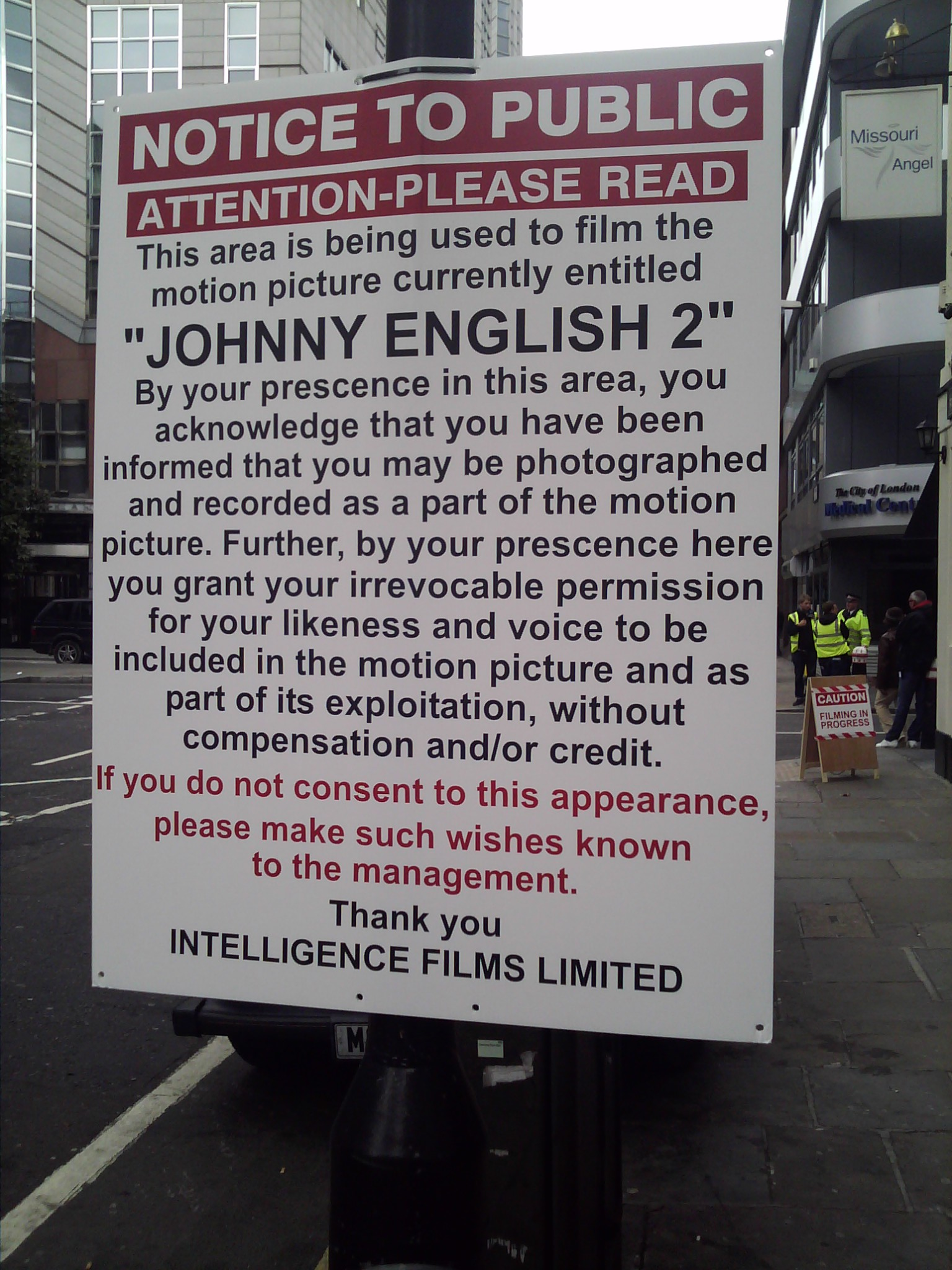
Filming for the sequel in London in September 2010

On 28 March 2007, Atkinson confirmed on Richard & Judy that a script for a second film was being worked on. In an interview for Mr. Bean's Holiday, Atkinson also stated that there was quite a moderate chance for a sequel. On 8 April 2010, Universal Pictures announced that they were producing a sequel to Johnny English, taking place seven years following the first film.

In June 2010, it was announced that Daniel Kaluuya had been added to the cast. In July 2010, Ben Miller, who featured as the sidekick 'Bough' in Johnny English, said he had not been approached to reprise his role. On 10 July 2010, Deadline Hollywood reported that Gillian Anderson would be playing an MI7 secret agent named Pamela Head.

Filming began on 11 September 2010, in Central London at Cannon Street, with further production scheduled for the week beginning 13 September 2010, at Brocket Hall, Hertfordshire and later in Hawley Woods in Hampshire, Macau and Hong Kong.

Filming took place on The Mall, London in Central London on 25 September 2010. Filming also took place in Kent, along the A299 carriageway and Cliffs End, Ramsgate.

=== Car ===
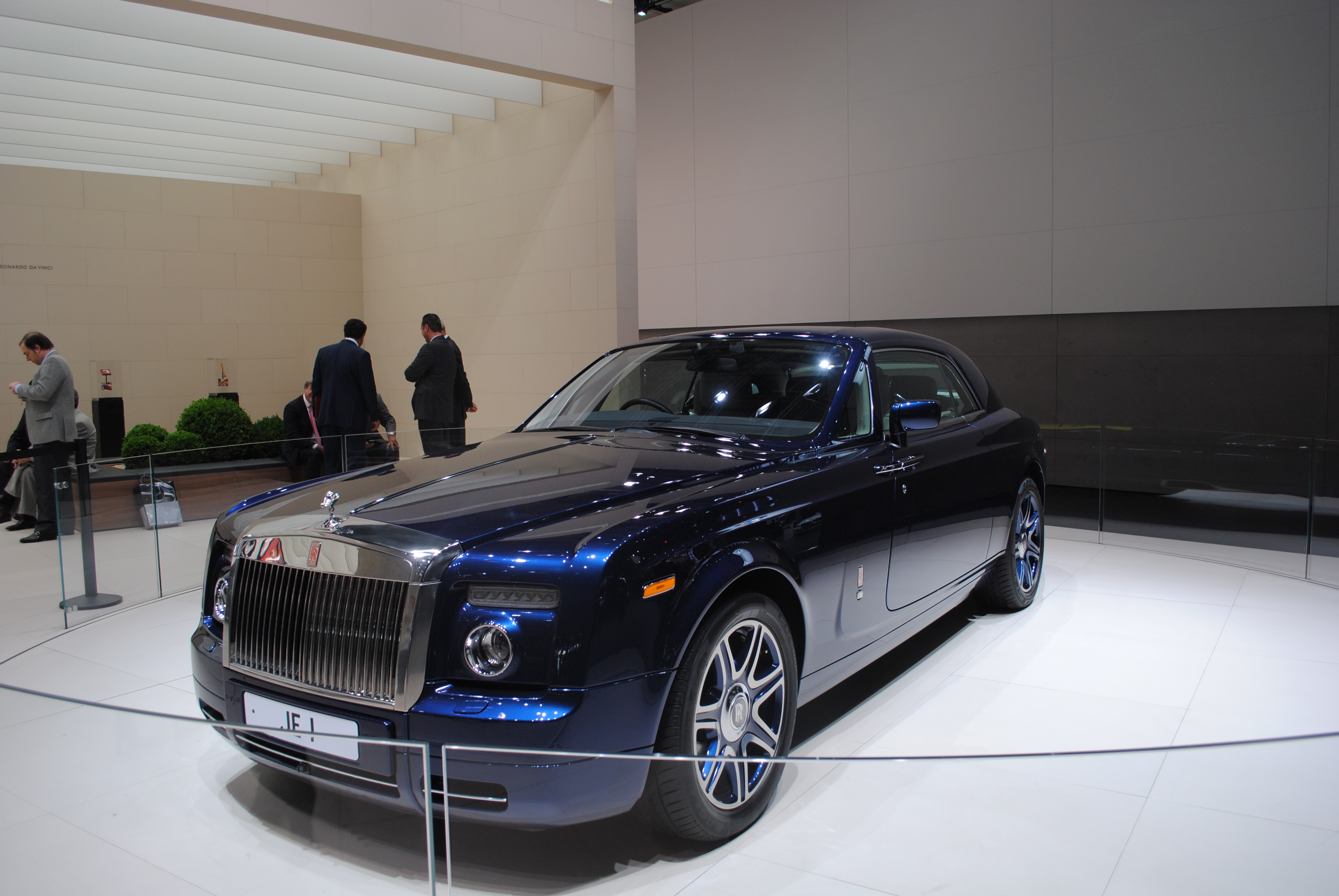
Johnny English's Rolls Royce.

The car that Johnny English drives was a Rolls-Royce Phantom Coupé with an experimental 9.0 litre V16 engine. There are only a few of these engines in existence, produced during tests for the Phantom Coupé, and they were not used in production models. For the production of the film, Atkinson approached the company and requested that they install one into a car, making the vehicle seen in the film unique.

== Release ==
Johnny English Reborn was originally going to be released on 29 July 2011. The film was then pushed back to 16 September 2011; however, it was delayed again, this time to 7 October 2011.

=== Home media ===
Johnny English Reborn was released on DVD and Blu-ray combo pack featuring the first film on 14 February 2012 in the United Kingdom, and on 28 February 2012 in North America.

== Reception ==
=== Box office ===
Johnny English Reborn opened to an estimated $3,833,300 in its first weekend in United States and Canada. In the United Kingdom, it grossed $7,727,025, $2,628,344 in Australia, and $3,391,190 in Germany. After five weeks in release, it grossed $8,305,970 in the United States and Canada and $151,772,616 elsewhere, bringing to a total of $160,078,586.

=== Critical response ===
The film received mixed reviews from critics, although cited as an improvement from the original. Review aggregator Rotten Tomatoes reports that 40% of 88 critics have given the film a positive review. The website's consensus is "Arguably a marginal improvement on its mostly forgotten predecessor, Johnny English Reborn nonetheless remains mired in broad, tired spy spoofing that wastes Rowan Atkinson's once considerable comedic talent". Metacritic gives the film a weighted average score of 46 out of 100 based on reviews from 20 critics, indicating "mixed or average" reviews. CinemaScore polls reported that the average grade moviegoers gave the film was a "B" on an A+ to F scale.

On the Australian television programme At the Movies, Margaret Pomeranz rated the film 3 stars and David Stratton rated the film 2 stars (out of 5). Indian film critic Nikhat Kazmi of the Times of India gave the film a positive review, praising Atkinson's characteristic flair for comedy once again, giving it a 4-star rating out of 5.

=== Accolades ===
Awards	Year	Categories	Recipients	Results
Phoenix Film Critics Society Awards	2011	Best Original Song	I Believe in You	Nominated
Evening Standard British Film Awards	2011	Blockbuster of the Year – People's Choice	Johnny English Reborn	Nominated

== Sequel ==
In May 2017, it was announced that pre-production had begun on a third film, which was released on 5 October 2018.
