= C11H18N2O3 =

The molecular formula C_{11}H_{18}N_{2}O_{3} (molar mass: 226.27 g/mol) may be referred as:

- Amobarbital
- Pentobarbital
