= Johnny English =

2003 film by Peter Howitt

- UK Theatrical release poster
- Directed by: Peter Howitt
- Written by: Neal Purvis; Robert Wade; William Davies
- Produced by: Tim Bevan; Eric Fellner; Mark Huffam
- Starring: Rowan Atkinson; Natalie Imbruglia; Ben Miller; John Malkovich
- Cinematography: Remi Adefarasin
- Edited by: Robin Sales
- Music by: Edward Shearmur
- Production companies: StudioCanal; Working Title Films
- Distributed by: Universal Pictures (International); Mars Distribution (France)
- Release dates: 11 April 2003 (United Kingdom); 18 July 2003 (United States)
- Running time: 88 minutes
- Countries: United Kingdom; France; United States
- Language: English
- Budget: $40 million
- Box office: $160.5 million

Johnny English is a 2003 spy action comedy film directed by Peter Howitt and written by Neal Purvis, Robert Wade and William Davies. Produced by StudioCanal and Working Title Films, the film centres on a clumsy MI7 agent in a mission to find the thieves of the Crown Jewels and retrieve the regalia.

Starring Rowan Atkinson in the title role along with Natalie Imbruglia, Ben Miller and John Malkovich, it is the first installment of the Johnny English film series and serves as a parody and homage to the spy genre, mainly the James Bond film series, as well as Atkinson's Mr. Bean character. The character is also related to Atkinson's bumbling spy character from a series of adverts in the United Kingdom for Barclaycard in the 1990s. The film was filmed in various locations across England, particularly in London and Buckinghamshire. Specific sites include Mentmore Towers, the Maughan Library, and the Freemason's Hall. The movie's climax was filmed on the French Riviera.

Distributed by Universal Pictures, the film was released theatrically in the United States on 18 July 2003. The film received mixed reviews from critics but was commercially successful and grossed $160 million worldwide against a budget of $40 million. The film was released in the United Kingdom on 11 April 2003 and topped the country's box office for the next three weekends, before being overtaken by X2. It was followed by two sequels, Johnny English Reborn (2011) and Johnny English Strikes Again (2018).

== Plot ==
Johnny English, a kindhearted but clumsy MI7 clerk, dreams of becoming the agency’s top agent. After Agent One is killed, followed by all of MI7's remaining agents at his funeral, both due to English's incompetence, he is left as the only agent capable of finishing Agent One's mission.

Assigned to thwart a plot to steal the newly restored Crown Jewels at an event hosted by French prison magnate Pascal Sauvage, English meets a mysterious woman named Lorna Campbell at the jewels' unveiling at the Tower of London. During a sudden blackout, the Crown Jewels are stolen and English accidentally knocks out the head of security. He fights an imaginary assailant to cover his mistakes, and gives a false description of the unseen suspect to MI7 head Pegasus.

English and his assistant Jeremy Bough follow a tunnel dug beneath the jewel's display case and confront German thieves Dieter Klein and Klaus Vendetta, who escape in a hearse. English loses them by pursuing a different hearse and ends up gatecrashing a funeral, until Bough saves him by having him pretend he is an escaped mental patient.

Sauvage is revealed to be Klein and Vendetta's employer, and instructs the thieves to eliminate English. Pegasus, a friend of Sauvage, refuses to believe English and Bough's claims that Sauvage is involved and orders them to exclude him from the investigation. English and Bough are attacked by Vendetta, who escapes when English mistakenly attacks Bough. English again encounters Campbell and, having seen her at two crime scenes, his suspicions deepen when no record of her can be found on a single government computer.

Determined to expose Sauvage, English and Bough infiltrate his headquarters via parachuting onto the building via C-130, English parachutes onto the wrong building. After getting into the right building, the two learn that Sauvage, a descendant of Charles Edward Stuart, plans to make himself king using an impostor Archbishop of Canterbury. English observes that the fake Archbishop has a tattoo on his backside saying Jesus is coming – look busy. They encounter and try to interrogate Klein, but English accidentally injects him and himself with a powerful muscle relaxant. Campbell appears and rescues the two, revealing herself to be an Interpol agent also tracking Sauvage. Attempting to inform Pegasus of his discoveries, English crashes a reception hosted by Sauvage and makes a fool of himself due to the relaxant. As a result, Pegasus dishonourably removes him from the case.

Sauvage abandons his plan to use the fake Archbishop and instead blackmails Queen Elizabeth II into abdicating and erasing her line of succession by threatening her corgis. Campbell, now in charge of the assignment, convinces English to travel to Sauvage's French château and investigate behind Pegasus' back. After learning that Sauvage intends to turn Great Britain into the world's largest prison, English accidentally blows their cover attempting to steal an incriminating DVD but accidentally takes the wrong disc before he and Campbell are captured.

Bough rescues English and Campbell, and they race to stop Sauvage's coronation. English exposes the Archbishop's bare bottom and discovers by the lack of the expected tattoo that he is genuine. Undeterred, English has Bough play the incriminating DVD, only to find it is footage of himself, from a bug placed by Sauvage in his flat, lip-syncing to ABBA's "Does Your Mother Know" in his underclothes. Having snuck away, English swings back in on a wire to steal St Edward's Crown from the Archbishop. Sauvage draws a gun and shoots at English, making him drop the crown, and moments before he is crowned, English lands on the throne knocking Sauvage off, and is crowned himself. As king, English has Sauvage arrested before restoring Elizabeth to the throne, requesting only a knighthood as a reward.

A radio newsreader announces that Sauvage is awaiting trial for high treason and execution, and that he has requested his brain be donated to schizophrenia research. English and Campbell drive to southern France but English accidentally ejects Campbell from his car while attempting to kiss her. In a mid-credits scene, she lands in a swimming pool where Bough and a man matching the description of the imaginary assailant are on holiday.

== Cast ==
- Rowan Atkinson as Johnny English
- Natalie Imbruglia as Lorna Campbell, an INTERPOL agent
- Ben Miller as Jeremy Bough, English's companion
- John Malkovich as Pascal Sauvage, a French prison owner and descendant of James II
- Oliver Ford Davies as the Archbishop of Canterbury
- Tim Pigott-Smith as Pegasus, (Note: In the Johnny English franchise, whoever leads MI7 is codenamed "Pegasus" and is known by that codename until retirement or forced departure from the position of head of MI7. It is the equivalent of the M in the James Bond franchise (those who lead MI6 receive the codename M and are known by that codename until retirement or forced departure from the position of head of MI6). Due to this, his true name is unknown.) the head of MI7
- Kevin McNally as Prime Minister of the United Kingdom
- Douglas McFerran as Klaus Vendetta, one of Sauvage's minions
- Steve Nicolson as Dieter Klein, one of Sauvage's minions
- Tasha de Vasconcelos as the Exotic Woman in English's daydream
- Greg Wise as Agent One, MI7's top agent whose death English is unknowingly responsible for
- Terence Harvey as the Funeral Officer at Agent One's funeral
- Nina Young as Pegasus' Secretary
- Rowland Davies as Sir Anthony Chevenix, Head of Royal Security
- Philippa Fordham as the Snobby Woman, whom English harasses at the Tower of London ceremony
- Prunella Scales as Queen Elizabeth II
- Tim Berrington as Roger, an MI7 agent who helps discover the identity of the "assailant" at the Tower of London
- Simon Bernstein as the Assailant, who English invents to cover his error
- Martin Lawton as the Hearse Driver at the funeral English mistakenly crashes
- Neville Phillips as the Priest at the funeral English mistakenly crashes
- Takuya Matsumoto as the Sushi Waiter
- Peter Tenn as the Sushi Bar Customer
- Sam Beazley as the Elderly Man at the Hospital
- Kevin Moore as the Doctor
- Faruk Pruti as the Truth Serum Guard
- Marc Danbury as the Guard that holds Bough at gunpoint in Sauvage's office
- Jack Raymond as the French Reception Waiter
- Jenny Galloway as the Foreign Secretary
- Chris Tarrant as the Radio Announcer at Sauvage's coronation
- James Greene as the Scottish Bishop at Sauvage's coronation
- Clive Graham as the Welsh Bishop at Sauvage's coronation
- Trevor McDonald as the Newsreader, who reveals Sauvage's fate

Additionally, the film's director Peter Howitt played a cameo in the film, as the man Bough threatens to play the DVD at Sauvage's coronation.

== Production ==
In March 2000, before the release of Maybe Baby, Atkinson signed up to star as a spoof 007.

In July 2002, Johnny English principal photography commenced. The film shot for fourteen weeks, filming at Shepperton Studios, on location in London and St. Albans, and finally setting down in Monte Carlo for two days to complete filming the final scene. In September 2002, it was announced that Natalie Imbruglia would star alongside Atkinson.

The character of Johnny English himself is based on a similar character called Richard Latham, who Atkinson played in a series of British television adverts for Barclaycard. The character of Bough (pronounced 'Boff') was retained from the adverts though another actor, Henry Naylor, played the part in the ads. Some of the gags from the adverts made it into the film, including English incorrectly identifying a waiter, and inadvertently shooting himself with a tranquilliser ballpoint pen, although he shot Pegasus' secretary with it in the movie.

=== Filming locations ===
- Some scenes were filmed at Canary Wharf in London—indeed, the film duplicates the single real tower into two identical ones (albeit on the real site) for the fictional London Hospital and Sauvage's headquarters at 1 Canada Square.
- The scenes set in Westminster Abbey were filmed in St. Albans Abbey: though this connection is solely implied through the dialogue—for this footage is never intercut with footage of the real abbey's exterior. The interior (with the televisual screen hiding the St Albans organ) is clearly St Albans. The choir singing in the coronation scene is St Albans Cathedral Choir.
- Both the exteriors and interiors in the introductory dream sequence scene are in Mentmore Towers.
- The exterior and interior of MI7's headquarters which English enters at the start is Freemasons' Hall, London, which is also used as Thames House (the MI5 headquarters) in Spooks.
- The scenes where Johnny English drives into Dover, Kent along the A20 road (with Dover Castle in the background) and then enters the Port of Dover (with a "Dover Ferry Terminal" sign, Dover's Athol Terrace and the White Cliffs of Dover in the background) to catch a ferry to France, were all shot on location.
- The exterior of Sauvage's French château is actually the castle atop St Michael's Mount in Cornwall.
- The scenes in Brompton Cemetery were filmed there.

== Reception ==
On Rotten Tomatoes, the film has an approval rating of 33% based on 120 reviews. The site's critical consensus reads, "A tame spy spoof that elicits infrequent chuckles." On Metacritic, the film has a score of 51 out of 100 based on 32 critics, indicating "mixed or average" reviews. Audiences polled by CinemaScore gave the film an average grade of "B" on an A+ to F scale.

== Soundtrack ==
Edward Shearmur composed the film's score. For the film's main theme, Shearmur incorporated the six note jingle that was composed by Howard Goodall for the Barclaycard advertisements that spawned the film. Like the Bond films, it also features an original song, composed by Robbie Williams & Hans Zimmer and performed by Williams. The soundtrack also includes songs by Bond, Moloko and ABBA. It was released in the U.S on July 15, 2003

All music is composed by Edward Shearmur and performed by Shearmur and the London Metropolitan Orchestra unless otherwise noted.

Johnny English (Original Motion Picture Soundtrack) track listing
No.	Title	Writer(s)	Artist(s)	Length
1.	"A Man for All Seasons"	Hans Zimmer and Robbie Williams	Williams	4:01
2.	"Theme from Johnny English"	Edward Shearmur and Howard Goodall	Shearmur	2:25
3.	"Russian Affairs"	Shearmur and Goodall	Shearmur	1:27
4.	"A Man of Sophistication"	Shearmur and Goodall	Shearmur	1:36
5.	"Kismet"	Gay-Yee Westerhoff	Bond	5:14
6.	"Truck Chase"	Shearmur and Goodall	Shearmur	4:53
7.	"The Only Ones"	Mark Brydon and Róisín Murphy	Moloko	4:13
8.	"Parachute Drop"	Shearmur and Goodall	Shearmur	2:48
9.	"Pascal's Evil Plan"	Shearmur	Shearmur	2:33
10.	"Theme from Johnny English (Salsa Version)"	Shearmur and Goodall	Bond	3:22
11.	"Off the Case"	Shearmur and Goodall	Shearmur	2:00
12.	"Cafe Conversation"	Shearmur	Shearmur	2:12
13.	"Into Pascal's Lair"	Shearmur and Goodall	Shearmur	1:43
14.	"Does Your Mother Know"	Benny Andersson and Björn Ulvaeus	ABBA	3:15
15.	"For England"	Shearmur and Goodall	Shearmur	2:23
16.	"Riviera Highway"	Shearmur	Shearmur	1:18
17.	"Agent No. 1"	Shearmur	Shearmur	15:13

== Home media ==
Johnny English was released on VHS on 11 August 2003 and on DVD on 11 January 2004. A DVD re-release, entitled Johnny English: Fully Loaded Edition, was released on 19 September 2011, including bonus material about its sequel Johnny English Reborn.

The film was released on Blu-ray on 28 February 2012, along with its sequel Johnny English Reborn. The film was released on Netflix in February 2016.

== Sequels ==
A sequel, titled Johnny English Reborn, was released in October 2011. In September 2010, filming for the sequel began, seven years after the release of the original, and concluded in March 2011. The start of the film finds Johnny English in an Asian monastery after being disgraced in an earlier mission. He is then reinstated to foil a plot to assassinate the Chinese Premier, Xiang Ping, while a mole is found in "MI7" and English has to deal with being framed.

In May 2017, it was announced that pre-production had begun on a third film titled Johnny English Strikes Again, which was released on 5 October 2018.

== See also ==
- Outline of James Bond
- List of British films of 2003
- Austin Powers: International Man of Mystery, a 1997 comedy film similarly lampooning the spy genre
