= Johnny English Strikes Again =

2018 film by David Kerr

- Theatrical release poster
- Directed by: David Kerr
- Screenplay by: William Davies
- Based on: Characters by Neal Purvis & Robert Wade and William Davies
- Produced by: Tim Bevan; Eric Fellner; Chris Clark; Rowan Atkinson (Note: Atkinson co-produced the film with Tim Bevan, Eric Fellner and Chris Clark but the Producers Guild of America awarded sole producers credit to Bevan, Fellner and Clark; Atkinson was instead uncredited for his producer job in the film’s final cut.)
- Starring: Rowan Atkinson; Ben Miller; Olga Kurylenko; Jake Lacy; Emma Thompson
- Cinematography: Florian Hoffmeister
- Edited by: Mark Everson
- Music by: Howard Goodall
- Production companies: StudioCanal; Working Title Films
- Distributed by: Universal Pictures
- Release dates: 20 September 2018 (Australia); 5 October 2018 (United Kingdom); 10 October 2018 (France)
- Running time: 89 minutes
- Countries: United Kingdom; France; Australia; United States
- Language: English
- Budget: $25 million
- Box office: $159 million

Johnny English Strikes Again is a 2018 spy action comedy film directed by David Kerr and written by William Davies. It is the third installment in the Johnny English film series and the sequel to Johnny English Reborn (2011). The film stars Rowan Atkinson as the titular character, alongside Ben Miller, Olga Kurylenko, Jake Lacy and Emma Thompson. The film follows the titular MI7 agent who is called into action when every undercover operative is exposed in a cyber attack.

The film was released in Australia on 20 September 2018 and in the United Kingdom on 5 October, by Universal Pictures. The film received mixed reviews from critics, and grossed $159 million against a $25 million budget.

== Plot ==
Seven years after the second film, a cyber attack exposes MI7’s field agents, forcing the agency to reinstate inactive agents, including Johnny English. Now a geography teacher, he secretly trains his students in espionage. Accidentally incapacitating the other retired agents, English is the sole agent left to accept the mission. He insists on his old sidekick and MI7 clerk, Jeremy Bough. Collecting their equipment, including explosive jelly babies and a tracker disguised as a Sherbet Fountain, English and Bough leave behind their mobile and drive an Aston Martin V8 Vantage to France to investigate.

They arrive at the Hotel Magnifique in Antibes, where the cyber attack originated. Undercover as waiters, they steal a mobile with a photo of the next target, the Dot Calm yacht, and English accidentally sets fire to the restaurant. Sneaking onto the yacht, he and Bough are caught by Russian operative Ophelia Bhuletova, but escape after seeing many computer servers.

Pursuing Bhuletova's electric BMW through the countryside, English and Bough run out of fuel. She finds them, arranging to meet at the Hotel de Paris in Cagnes-sur-Mer. While English meets her at the hotel bar, Bough discovers she is a spy, but English rejects his suspicions. Attempting to kill him in his room upon nightfall, Bhuletova fails after a sleepless English accidentally consumes energy pills instead of sleeping pills and forcefully vacates the room to attend a party, accidentally knocking her out in the process. She pursues him, but her various attempts to assassinate the oblivious English are inadvertently parried, ending with her being accidentally knocked out once more.

Further cyber attacks force the Prime Minister to solidify an agreement with Silicon Valley billionaire Jason Volta, to be revealed during a forthcoming G12 meeting. Learning Volta owns the Dot Calm, and suspecting he is behind the cyber attack, English and Bough return home and plan to infiltrate Volta's mansion to seek proof. In preparation, English is given a virtual reality exploration of the building, but he unintentionally leaves the simulation room, assaulting various people while in the virtual environment. Arriving at the mansion, English discovers Bhuletova is also a spy, and he records evidence of Volta's plans with her iPhone, but accidentally presses the wrong button, playing music from the phone and exposing himself. English escapes, hijacking a driving instructor's car, returning to MI7 after being chased by Volta.

However, English mixes up iPhones with a driving student, thus failing to convince MI7 and the Prime Minister of Volta's schemes. Hearing of both the restaurant and virtual reality incidents, she fires English, Bough and Pegasus and proceeds with the G12 meeting in Scotland. Bough convinces English to stop Volta anyway, enlisting his wife Lydia, a Navy captain of submarine HMS Vengeance, to arrive at Garroch Castle via Loch Nevis.

Bhuletova attempts to kill Volta but, knowing she is a spy, he has immunized himself to her poison ring and removed her gun's firing pin. Scaling the castle using a powered bodysuit, English intervenes before Volta can kill her, who escapes. Volta plans to extort the G12 leaders by threatening to shut down the internet. English calls MI7, forgetting Lydia's warning about using a mobile near the submarine. An MI7 secretary unintentionally places two telephones next to each other: one on a call from English, the other from Lydia, calling to confirm a launch code English inadvertently keyed in. Mistakenly given the order to attack by English, Lydia launches a ballistic missile. The missile diverts to a Sherbet Fountain beacon left by English on the Dot Calm, destroying the yacht and Volta's server.

English, in a suit of armour, Bough and Bhuletova chase Volta to his helicopter as he starts to reroute the attack to a server in Nevada. Bhuletova gives English a tablet to disable Volta's Aerospatiale Gazelle helicopter. When Volta mocks his inability to use digital technology, English throws the tablet at him, hitting him in the head and knocking him out, then smashes his phone with a sword to stop the attack. The Prime Minister praises and forgives English for his attitude, who accidentally disrobes before the press and G12 leaders while removing the armour.

English returns to his school as a guest speaker, welcomed by his students. However, to his horror, he sees the headmaster about to eat one of the explosive Jelly Babies.

== Cast ==
- Rowan Atkinson as Johnny English, Esq., a geography teacher and retired MI7 agent who is reinstated for a mission.
- Ben Miller as Jeremy Bough, an MI7 agent and former assistant to English.
- Olga Kurylenko as Ophelia Bhuletova, a Russian spy. Kurylenko previously portrayed Camille Montes in the James Bond film Quantum of Solace.
- Jake Lacy as Jason Volta, a Silicon Valley tech billionaire who is promoting a system that could improve data management. (Note: He is the only non-European of the three main antagonists of the franchise: unlike Pascal Sauvage (from the first film, who was French) and Simon Ambrose (from Johnny English Reborn, who was British), Volta is American and represents the typical American tech billionaire: billionaire, young, good looking and owner of a powerful company from Silicon Valley.)
- Emma Thompson as Prime Minister of the United Kingdom.
- Adam James as Pegasus, (Note: In the Johnny English franchise, whoever leads MI7 is codenamed "Pegasus" and is known by that codename until retirement or forced departure from the position of head of MI7. It is the equivalent of the M in the James Bond franchise (those who lead MI6 receive the codename M and are known by that codename until retirement or forced departure from the position of head of MI6). Due to this, his true name is unknown.) the head of MI7.
- Amit Shah as Samir, assistant to the Prime Minister.
- Matthew Beard as P, weapon expert of MI7.
- Michael Gambon as Agent Five.
- Charles Dance as Agent Seven.
- Edward Fox as Agent Nine.
- Vicki Pepperdine as Lydia, Bough's wife and a Royal Navy officer.
- Pippa Bennett-Warner as Lesley, secretary to Pegasus.
- Roger Barclay as Sebastian Lynch, a suspect.
- Irena Tyshyna as Viola Lynch, Sebastian's wife.
- Pauline McLynn as Mrs. Trattner.
- Gus Brown as the headmaster at the school.
- Kevin Eldon as MI7 Night Duty Agent.

== Production ==
In May 2017, it was announced that Rowan Atkinson would be returning to take the role of Johnny English in the sequel to the film Johnny English Reborn (2011). On 3 August 2017, Working Title Films announced that they had begun production and filming with the director David Kerr. The cinematographer was Florian Hoffmeister. This is the second spy film starring both Rowan Atkinson and Edward Fox, who appears in a minor role as the retired Agent Nine (Atkinson and Fox had both appeared earlier in the 1983 non-Eon James Bond film Never Say Never Again).

The production designer was Simon Bowles, who won an award for his designs for this movie at the 2019 British Film Designers Guild Awards, shared with set decorator Liz Griffiths and supervising art director Ben Collins. Parts were also filmed in Welham Green, Hertfordshire; and in Gloucestershire. Filming continued in France from 26 September, at the Saint Aygulf beach in Var.

On 4 April 2018, the title was revealed to be Johnny English Strikes Again, with a teaser trailer released the day after.

The car that Johnny English drives was an Aston Martin V8 Vantage (1977). The car is personally owned by Rowan Atkinson, who drove it during car scenes in the movie. He bought the car a few months prior to the production of the film.

== Release ==
=== Theatrical ===
Johnny English Strikes Again was scheduled to be released in both the United Kingdom and United States on 12 October 2018 by Universal Pictures; the date for the United States was later moved up to 20 September 2018, before being pushed back to 26 October 2018. It was released in Portugal on 5 October 2018 by Cinemax Angola.

=== Home media ===
The film was set to be released digitally on 4 February 2019, and on DVD, Blu-ray, and Ultra HD Blu-ray format on 18 February, alongside a box set of all three movies in the franchise. In Australia, the film's digital release was moved up to 19 December 2018 while the Blu-Ray and DVD release in the United States and Canada was 22 January 2019.

== Reception ==
=== Box office ===
Johnny English Strikes Again has grossed $4.4 million in the United States and Canada, and $154.5 million elsewhere (including $23.2 million in the United Kingdom), for a total worldwide gross of $159 million.

In the United States and Canada, Johnny English Strikes Again was released alongside Hunter Killer and Indivisible as well as the wide expansion of Mid90s, and was projected to gross around $2 million from 544 theatres in its opening weekend. It ended up debuting to $1.6 million, finishing 12th at the box office. Deadline Hollywood noted the film's American release was essentially a formality, as it was not built for the audience in the United States, and thus the low opening wasn't seen as a disappointment to the studio.

Outside North America, the film debuted to $5.5 million in the United Kingdom and grossed $14.1 million overall in its second week for a to date total gross of $66.5 million. In its third weekend of international release, the film added another $9.8 million from 57 countries, including a $2.4 million opening in Germany, for a running cumulative total of $96 million.

=== Critical response ===
On review aggregator Rotten Tomatoes, the film holds an approval rating of 37% based on 106 reviews, with an average rating of 4.8/10. The website's critical consensus reads, "Johnny English Strikes Again might get a few giggles out of viewers pining for buffoonish pratfalls, but for the most part, this sequel simply strikes out." On Metacritic, the film has a weighted average score of 39 out of 100, based on 22 critics, indicating "generally unfavorable" reviews.

== Future ==
In a Reddit Ask Me Anything (AMA) thread in October 2018, when asked about more Johnny English films, Rowan Atkinson replied with: "I doubt it but thank you very much for implying you'd like to see another one. But at the same time...never say never."
