= List of accolades received by How to Train Your Dragon (2010 film) =

How to Train Your Dragon accolades
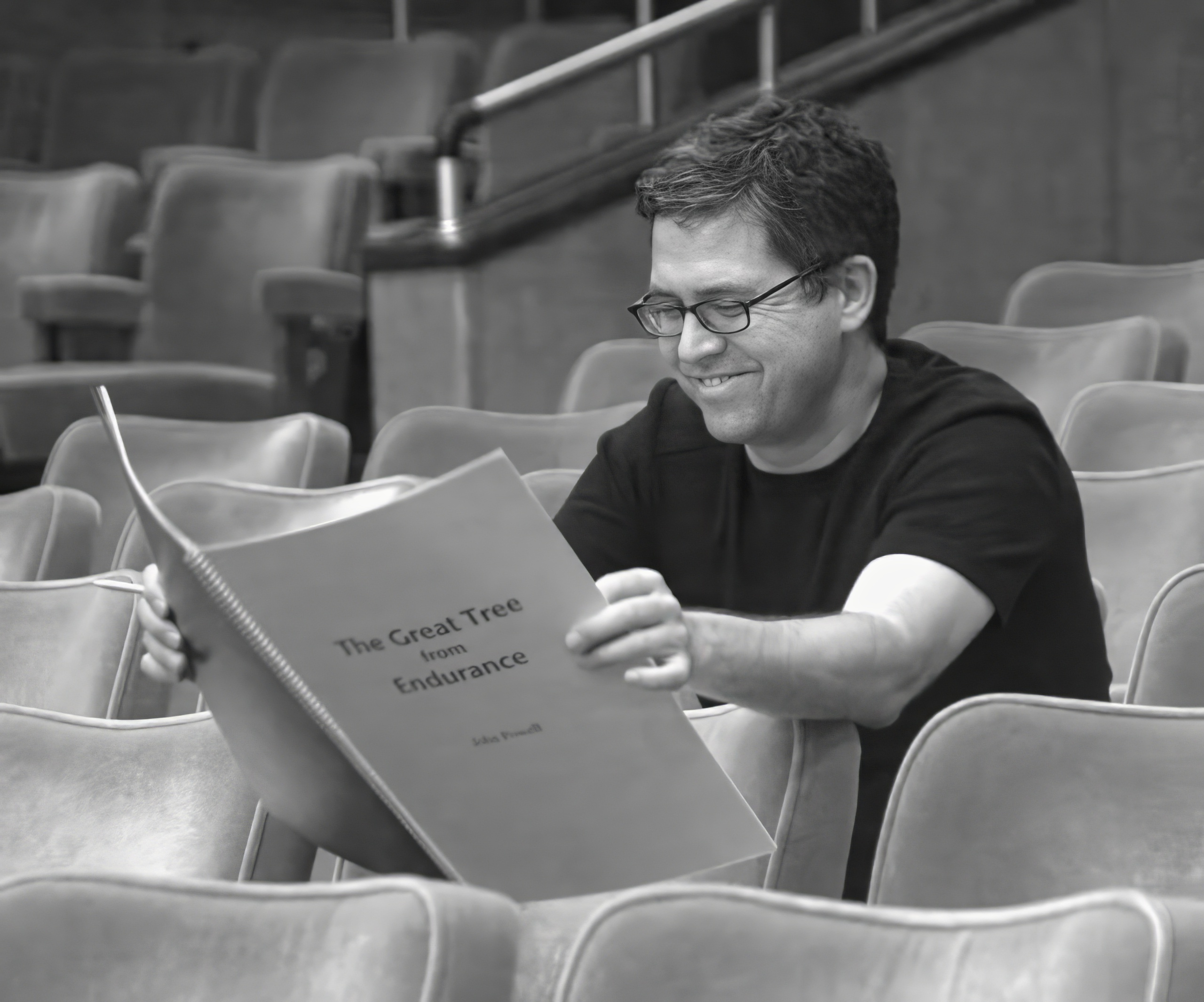
- Composer John Powell received multiple awards and nominations for his work.
Awards and nominations
| Award | Wins | Nominations |
| 3D Creative Arts Awards | 3 | 3 |
| Academy Awards | 0 | 2 |
| Alliance of Women Film Journalists Awards | 1 | 2 |
| American Cinema Editors Awards | 0 | 1 |
| Annie Awards | 10 | 14 |
| ASCAP Awards | 1 | 1 |
| British Academy Film Awards | 0 | 2 |
| Chicago Film Critics Association Awards | 0 | 1 |
| Critics' Choice Movie Awards | 0 | 1 |
| Dallas–Fort Worth Film Critics Association Awards | 0 | 1 |
| Genesis Awards | 1 | 1 |
| Golden Globe Awards | 0 | 1 |
| Golden Reel Awards | 1 | 1 |
| Golden Trailer Awards | 0 | 1 |
| Houston Film Critics Society Awards | 0 | 2 |
| Hugo Awards | 0 | 1 |
| International Cinephile Society Awards | 0 | 1 |
| International Film Music Critics Association Awards | 2 | 5 |
| Ivor Novello Awards | 1 | 1 |
| Movieguide Awards | 0 | 1 |
| Nebula Awards | 0 | 1 |
| Nickelodeon Kids' Choice Awards (Australia) | 0 | 1 |
| Nickelodeon Kids' Choice Awards (United States) | 0 | 1 |
| Online Film Critics Society Awards | 0 | 1 |
| People's Choice Awards | 0 | 1 |
| Producers Guild of America Awards | 0 | 1 |
| San Diego Film Critics Society Awards | 0 | 1 |
| Satellite Awards | 0 | 1 |
| Saturn Awards | 0 | 3 |
| St. Louis Film Critics Association Awards | 0 | 1 |
| Teen Choice Awards | 0 | 1 |
| Toronto Film Critics Association Awards | 1 | 1 |
| Venice Film Festival | 1 | 1 |
| Visual Effects Society Awards | 3 | 3 |
| Washington D.C. Area Film Critics Association Awards | 0 | 1 |
| World Soundtrack Awards | 0 | 2 |

Totals (Note: Certain award groups do not simply award one winner. They acknowledge several different recipients, have runners-up, and have third place. Since this is a specific recognition and is different from losing an award, runner-up mentions are considered wins in this award tally. For simplification and to avoid errors, each award in this list has been presumed to have had a prior nomination.)
- Wins: 25
- Nominations: 65

How to Train Your Dragon is a 2010 American animated action fantasy film loosely based on the 2003 book of the same name by Cressida Cowell; the film was produced by DreamWorks Animation and distributed by Paramount Pictures. It was directed by Chris Sanders and Dean DeBlois from a screenplay they co-wrote with Will Davies, and stars the voices of Jay Baruchel, Gerard Butler, Craig Ferguson, America Ferrera, Jonah Hill, Christopher Mintz-Plasse, T.J. Miller, and Kristen Wiig. The film follows a young Viking teenager named Hiccup (Baruchel), who befriends a Night Fury dragon after capturing it.

How to Train Your Dragon premiered in Los Angeles on March 21, 2010, and was released in the United States on March 26. Produced on a budget of $165 million, How to Train Your Dragon grossed $494.9 million worldwide, finishing its theatrical run as the tenth-highest-grossing film of 2010. On the review aggregator website Rotten Tomatoes, the film holds an approval rating of 99% based on 210 reviews.

How to Train Your Dragon garnered awards and nominations in various categories with particular recognition for John Powell's musical score. At the 83rd Academy Awards, it received nominations for Best Animated Feature and Best Original Score. The film garnered fourteen nominations at the 38th Annie Awards, including Best Animated Feature and Outstanding Achievement for Directing in an Animated Feature Production, and won ten awards. How to Train Your Dragon also received nominations for two British Academy Film Awards, the Critics' Choice Movie Award for Best Animated Feature, and the Golden Globe Award for Best Animated Feature Film.

== Accolades ==
Accolades received by How to Train Your Dragon (2010 film)
| Award | Date of ceremony | Category | Recipient(s) | Result | Ref. |
|---|---|---|---|---|---|
| 3D Creative Arts Awards | February 9, 2011 | Best Feature Film – Animation | How to Train Your Dragon | Won | |
| 3D Creative Arts Awards | February 9, 2011 | Best Stereoscopic Feature Film – Animation | How to Train Your Dragon | Won | |
| 3D Creative Arts Awards | February 9, 2011 | 3D Talent Award | Jay Baruchel | Won | |
| Academy Awards | February 27, 2011 | Best Animated Feature | Chris Sanders and Dean DeBlois | Nominated | |
| Academy Awards | February 27, 2011 | Best Original Score | John Powell | Nominated | |
| Alliance of Women Film Journalists Awards | December 24, 2010 | Best Animated Feature | How to Train Your Dragon | Nominated | |
| Alliance of Women Film Journalists Awards | December 24, 2010 | Best Animated Female | America Ferrera | Won | |
| American Cinema Editors Awards | February 19, 2011 | Best Edited Animated Feature Film | Maryann Brandon and Darren T. Holmes | Nominated | |
| Annie Awards | February 5, 2011 | Best Animated Feature | How to Train Your Dragon | Won | |
| Annie Awards | February 5, 2011 | Outstanding Achievement for Animated Effects in an Animated Production | Brett Miller | Won | |
| Annie Awards | February 5, 2011 | Outstanding Achievement for Animated Effects in an Animated Production | Jason Mayer | Nominated | |
| Annie Awards | February 5, 2011 | Outstanding Achievement for Character Animation in a Feature Production | Gabe Hordos | Won | |
| Annie Awards | February 5, 2011 | Outstanding Achievement for Character Animation in a Feature Production | Jakob Hjort Jensen | Nominated | |
| Annie Awards | February 5, 2011 | Outstanding Achievement for Character Animation in a Feature Production | David Torres | Nominated | |
| Annie Awards | February 5, 2011 | Outstanding Achievement for Character Design in a Feature Production | Nico Marlet | Won | |
| Annie Awards | February 5, 2011 | Outstanding Achievement for Directing in a Feature Production | Dean DeBlois and Chris Sanders | Won | |
| Annie Awards | February 5, 2011 | Outstanding Achievement for Music in a Feature Production | John Powell | Won | |
| Annie Awards | February 5, 2011 | Outstanding Achievement for Production Design in an Animated Feature Production | Pierre Olivier Vincent | Won | |
| Annie Awards | February 5, 2011 | Outstanding Achievement for Storyboarding in a Feature Production | Tom Owens | Won | |
| Annie Awards | February 5, 2011 | Outstanding Achievement for Storyboarding in a Feature Production | Alessandro Carloni | Nominated | |
| Annie Awards | February 5, 2011 | Outstanding Achievement for Voice Acting in an Animated Feature Production | Jay Baruchel | Won | |
| Annie Awards | February 5, 2011 | Outstanding Achievement for Voice Acting in an Animated Feature Production | Gerard Butler | Nominated | |
| Annie Awards | February 5, 2011 | Outstanding Achievement for Writing in a Feature Production | William Davies, Dean DeBlois, and Chris Sanders | Won | |
| ASCAP Awards | June 23, 2011 | Top Box Office Films | John Powell | Won | |
| British Academy Film Awards | February 13, 2011 | Best Animated Film | Chris Sanders and Dean DeBlois | Nominated | |
| British Academy Film Awards | February 13, 2011 | Best Original Music | John Powell | Nominated | |
| Chicago Film Critics Association Awards | December 20, 2010 | Best Animated Film | How to Train Your Dragon | Nominated | |
| Critics' Choice Movie Awards | January 14, 2011 | Best Animated Feature | How to Train Your Dragon | Nominated | |
| Dallas–Fort Worth Film Critics Association Awards | December 17, 2010 | Best Animated Film | How to Train Your Dragon | Nominated | |
| Genesis Awards | March 19, 2011 | Best Feature Film | How to Train Your Dragon | Won | |
| Golden Globe Awards | January 16, 2011 | Best Animated Feature Film | How to Train Your Dragon | Nominated | |
| Golden Reel Awards | February 20, 2011 | Outstanding Achievement in Sound Editing – Musical for Feature Film | Randy Thom, Jonathan Null, Al Nelson, Pascal Garneau, Chris Gridley, Colette D. Dahanne, Josh Gold, Pete Horner, Sue Fox, Andrea Gard, Richard Quinn, Dennie Thorpe, and Jana Vance | Won | |
| Golden Trailer Awards | June 10, 2010 | Best Animation/Family | "Prepare" (Aspect Ratio) | Nominated | |
| Houston Film Critics Society Awards | December 18, 2010 | Best Animated Film | How to Train Your Dragon | Nominated | |
| Houston Film Critics Society Awards | December 18, 2010 | Best Original Score | John Powell | Nominated | |
| Hugo Awards | August 20, 2011 | Best Dramatic Presentation, Long Form | William Davies, Dean DeBlois, and Chris Sanders | Nominated | |
| International Cinephile Society Awards | February 18, 2011 | Best Animated Film | How to Train Your Dragon | Nominated | |
| International Film Music Critics Association Awards | February 24, 2011 | Film Score of the Year | John Powell | Won | |
| International Film Music Critics Association Awards | February 24, 2011 | Best Original Score for an Animated Film | John Powell | Won | |
| International Film Music Critics Association Awards | February 24, 2011 | Film Music Composition of the Year | John Powell for "Forbidden Friendship" | Nominated | |
| International Film Music Critics Association Awards | February 24, 2011 | Film Music Composition of the Year | John Powell for "Test Drive" | Nominated | |
| International Film Music Critics Association Awards | February 18, 2021 | Best New Archival Release of an Existing Score – Re-Release or Re-Recording | John Powell | Nominated | |
| Ivor Novello Awards | May 19, 2011 | Best Original Film Score | John Powell | Won | |
| Movieguide Awards | February 18, 2011 | Best Movies for Families | How to Train Your Dragon | Nominated | |
| Nebula Awards | May 21, 2011 | Ray Bradbury Nebula Award for Outstanding Dramatic Presentation | Chris Sanders, Dean DeBlois, and Will Davies | Nominated | |
| Nickelodeon Kids' Choice Awards (Australia) | October 8, 2010 | Fave Movie | How to Train Your Dragon | Nominated | |
| Nickelodeon Kids' Choice Awards (United States) | April 2, 2011 | Favorite Animated Movie | How to Train Your Dragon | Nominated | |
| Online Film Critics Society Awards | January 3, 2011 | Best Animated Film | How to Train Your Dragon | Nominated | |
| People's Choice Awards | January 5, 2011 | Favorite Family Movie | How to Train Your Dragon | Nominated | |
| Producers Guild of America Awards | January 22, 2011 | Best Animated Motion Picture | Bonnie Arnold | Nominated | |
| San Diego Film Critics Society Awards | December 14, 2010 | Best Animated Feature | How to Train Your Dragon | Nominated | |
| Satellite Awards | December 19, 2010 | Best Animated or Mixed Media Feature | How to Train Your Dragon | Nominated | |
| Saturn Awards | June 23, 2011 | Best Music | John Powell | Nominated | |
| Saturn Awards | June 23, 2011 | Best Production Design | Kathy Altieri | Nominated | |
| Saturn Awards | June 23, 2011 | Best Animated Film | How to Train Your Dragon | Nominated | |
| St. Louis Film Critics Association Awards | December 20, 2010 | Best Animated Feature | How to Train Your Dragon | Nominated | |
| Teen Choice Awards | August 8, 2010 | Choice Animated Movie | How to Train Your Dragon | Nominated | |
| Toronto Film Critics Association Awards | December 14, 2010 | Best Animated Film | How to Train Your Dragon | Won | |
| Venice Film Festival | September 1–11, 2010 | Most Creative 3D Film of the Year | How to Train Your Dragon | Won (Note: Tied with Avatar (2009)) | |
| Visual Effects Society Awards | February 1, 2011 | Outstanding Visual Effects in an Animated Feature | Simon Otto, Craig Ring, and Bonnie Arnold | Won | |
| Visual Effects Society Awards | February 1, 2011 | Outstanding Animated Character in an Animated Feature | Gabe Hordos, Cassidy Curtis, Mariette Marinus, and Brent Watkins | Won | |
| Visual Effects Society Awards | February 1, 2011 | Outstanding Effects Animation in an Animated Feature Motion Picture | Andy Hayes, Laurent Kermel, Jason Mayer, and Brett Miller | Won | |
| Washington D.C. Area Film Critics Association Awards | December 6, 2010 | Best Animated Feature | How to Train Your Dragon | Nominated | |
| World Soundtrack Awards | August 23, 2010 | Soundtrack Composer of the Year | John Powell (Note: Also for Green Zone (2010) and Ice Age: Dawn of the Dinosaurs (2009)) | Nominated | |
| World Soundtrack Awards | August 23, 2010 | Best Original Song Written Directly for a Film | Jónsi for "Sticks & Stones" | Nominated | |
