= Emily Newton =

Emily Newton may refer to:

- Emily Newton, a character in the Beethoven film series
- Emily Newton, American soprano who played the title role in the 2013 European premiere of Anna Nicole, an English opera
