= Man vs Baby =

2025 British comedy television miniseries

- Promotional release poster
- Genre: Comedy; Slapstick
- Created by: William Davies; Rowan Atkinson
- Written by: William Davies; Rowan Atkinson
- Directed by: David Kerr
- Starring: Rowan Atkinson
- Music by: Lorne Balfe
- Country of origin: United Kingdom
- Original language: English
- No. of series: 1
- No. of episodes: 4

Production
- Executive producers: Chris Clark; William Davies
- Producer: Kate Fasulo
- Cinematography: James Mather
- Editor: Richard Ketteridge
- Running time: 24–37 minutes
- Production company: HouseSitter Productions

Original release
- Network: Netflix
- Release: 11 December 2025

Related
- Man vs Bee

Man vs Baby is a British comedy television miniseries created and written by William Davies and Rowan Atkinson. A follow-up to Man vs Bee (2022), Atkinson reprises his role as Trevor Bingley.

Man vs Baby premiered on 11 December 2025 on Netflix and received positive reviews from critics.

== Premise ==
The series is a continuation of Man vs. Bee. After Trevor Bingley has had trouble dealing with a bee at a mansion, he ends up housesitting at a luxurious London penthouse and again is left with another unwanted companion.

== Cast and characters ==
- Rowan Atkinson as Trevor Bingley
- Claudie Blakley as Jess, Trevor's ex-wife
- Alanah Bloor as Maddy, Trevor's daughter (Bloor replaces India Fowler in the role)
- Nina Sosanya as Diana
- Rosie Cavaliero as Pamela
- Joseph Balderrama as Cesar Jimenez
- Sunil Patel as Detective Sergeant Gupta
- Susannah Fielding as Petra
- Sunetra Sarker as Georgia Hakopian
- Robert Bathurst as Lionel
- Ivana Bašić as Elsa
- Susy Kane as Annabel
- Ellie White as Amethyst
- Angus Imrie as Soren
- Ashley Jensen as Janet
- Steve Edge as the Met police officer

== Episodes ==
No.	Title	Directed by	Written by	Original release date
1	"Chapter 1"	David Kerr	William Davies & Rowan Atkinson	11 December 2025
Set during the days nearing Christmas, Trevor Bingley now resides in Hertfordshire away from his ex-wife Jess and daughter Maddy. Coinciding with his last day as a primary school caretaker, Jess informs him that she and Maddy would not be able to spend the Christmas together due to an invitation to Barbados with Jess' new boyfriend. Trevor then collects a baby from the school back door, known as "baby Jesus" for the nativity set that is part of the school performance. In the midst of the production, Trevor receives a phone call from the new parent company of Housesitters Deluxe, Grupo del Sanchez Romero, who sends him an invitation to be the replacement housekeeper of a luxurious house in London over Christmas. Trevor initially declines but after the pay is revealed to be £10,000, gladly accepts the invitation but in pure revelation accidentally drops the raised nativity star which startles the crowd. Upon the school's closure, Trevor soon discovers that "baby Jesus" was left unattended and attempts to contact his parents, but ends up discovering the wrong parent and ends up having to contact social services. In a rush to head to London, the worker arrives to collect the baby, but Trevor discovers he has gone missing, and in the meantime the worker loses patience and leaves the house following a lengthy search. Trevor eventually finds the baby and drives to the social services centre, only to discover it is closed for Christmas break. Left with no choice, Trevor is forced to take the baby along to London, where he discovers the house owned by the Schwarzenbochs.
2	"Chapter 2"	David Kerr	William Davies & Rowan Atkinson	11 December 2025
Upon his arrival at the home of the Schwarzenbochs, Trevor meets Petra who is the executive concierge for the family. Afraid for her to notice the baby, Trevor hides it in his backpack and covers the baby's googling noises with his own, much to the suspicion of Petra. She introduces him to the penthouse, which requires a special fob to access along with the vast array of facilities available for use. During Petra's introduction of the flat, the baby wanders off but Trevor discovers him and hides him in a wooden bin. Following Petra's departure, Trevor discovers a smell from the baby, but without a nappy, decides to use the family's luxurious silk scarfs as a replacement. Trevor then takes the baby for shopping during the evening and is redirected to a call from London's local social services, although they would be unable to pick up the baby until the next afternoon. Placing the baby in a Fortnum & Mason basket as a crib, Trevor instinctively uses a champagne cork to act as a dummy for the baby following his cries late at night in order to sleep well. With all the scarfs having been used up as replacement nappies, Trevor orders some nappies from Deliveroo but discovers that he has forgotten to bring the fob to access the penthouse upon collecting them, as the baby begins crawling up the stairs.
3	"Chapter 3"	David Kerr	William Davies & Rowan Atkinson	11 December 2025
Without the fob to return to the penthouse, Trevor must call Elsa, the original cleaner for the Schwarzenbochs. Trevor has also left his phone at the penthouse, and gets Lionel, a fellow worker, to help with the call. Elsa arrives and reluctantly lends him her fob. Trevor then loses his shoe by trying to use it to block the lift while he collects the nappies, and is locked out again. Trevor then tracks Elsa down in the street to get the fob back. Meanwhile, a dog named Archie has collected Trevor's shoe in the lift and made use of it as a toy. Maddy makes a phone call to Trevor and informs him that the flight to Barbados would be delayed by an entire day as she and Jess remain in the airport. That night, Trevor awakens to a couple, who live secretly in the building, stealing food from the fridge. Instead of calling the police, Trevor offers them more food for them and their baby. They disappear, shocked by his kindness. After a call from social service worker Georgia Hakopian to collect the baby, Trevor decides to take it out for one last stroll in a trolley. He reunites with Archie, who then claims his other shoe. The clandestine couple return and thank Trevor for his actions the previous night, and Trevor offers to babysit for them the couple head to a housing office appointment. However, as Mrs. Hakopian arrives, Trevor mistakenly hands the wrong baby to her, and only discovers this when the couple return. Trevor manages to collect the couple's baby from the car while Hakopian is distracted, before bringing the right baby back down. However, Hakopian had already driven off with no baby in the car. Trevor then receives a call from Petra, who informs him that the Schwarzenbochs are making a sudden return to their home in London.
4	"Chapter 4"	David Kerr	William Davies & Rowan Atkinson	11 December 2025
Following the message that the Schwarzenbochs will be returning back to London, Trevor gets in touch with their housekeeper Janet, who is unable to reach the penthouse due to family arrangements. She then hands off a list of ingredients required to prepare a Christmas feast for the Schwarzenbochs upon their arrival, and Trevor manages to transport them all back to the penthouse with the help of 5 trolleys. Occurring at a similar time, Mrs. Hakopian discovers that there is no baby and makes a call to the police, to which the investigation of a missing baby begins. In the meantime, Trevor provides a few small gifts for the couple in their shelter. As Archie is handed off to a dog keeper, he once again notices Trevor's lost shoe and ends up following him up to the penthouse, to which he writes a notice on the lift for his owner to collect him. Now being forced to take care of both the baby and the dog, Archie gets hold of the spreadable sausage, a family favourite of the Schwarzenbochs. Trevor tries to distract it with a shoe key ring, but in the process Archie devours the fob, leaving Trevor without choice but to get hold of Archie as part of access to the penthouse. Annabel, the dog's owner, calls to retrieve the dog, and in order to get hold of the fob, Trevor takes Archie for a walk before he finally releases faeces in which the fob is contained in. Trevor also manages to get hold of the Christmas decorations and prepares the feast for the Schwarzenbochs, who were expected to arrive at 5 in the afternoon. Petra then calls him and informs that the Schwarzenbochs have made a last-second decision to head to New York instead, leaving Trevor's efforts wasted. He then receives an intercom from a member of the Metropolitan police to hand off the baby, to which he offers him a drink following inconclusive visual evidence of the baby which would require additional investigation. Soon later, the couple, Lionel, Annabel, Mrs. Hakopian and later Jess along with Maddy arrive at the penthouse following the cancellation of their flight to Barbados. Trevor rejoices with them all as they enjoy the Christmas feast, with the baby symbolically sitting in a nativity set with all of Trevor's connections around him. An intercom then rings which comes from the entire Schwarzenboch family, as they all arrive upon a last-second decision, leaving Trevor in shock.

== Production ==
Netflix announced the series on 16 December 2024, stating it was in production and reuniting Atkinson and William Davies with director David Kerr. Trade coverage noted filming underway in December 2024 and listed HouseSitter Productions as producer with Chris Clark and William Davies as executive producers and Kate Fasulo as series producer. The series comprises four episodes of approximately 30 minutes each.

== Release ==
First-look images were publicised on 8 October 2025 by the UK trade press including Televisual, Chortle, and British Comedy Guide. The series was released on 11 December 2025 on Netflix.

== Reception ==
On the review aggregator website Rotten Tomatoes, 72% of 18 critics' reviews are positive. The website's consensus reads: "Rowan Atkinson is goo-goo gags galore in Man VS Baby, a pleasantly ambient holiday comedy that reaps the rewards of his quirky style." Metacritic, which uses a weighted average, assigned the series a score of 70 out of 100, based on four critics, indicating "generally favorable" reviews.

The show was nominated for the 24th Visual Effects Society Awards in the category of Outstanding Supporting Visual Effects in a Photoreal Episode for "Chapter One".
