= Insomnia (TV series) =

British television series

- Genre: Thriller
- Based on: Insomnia by Sarah Pinborough
- Written by: Sarah Pinborough
- Directed by: Börkur Sigthorsson
- Starring: Vicky McClure; Tom Cullen; Leanne Best
- Music by: Hannah Peel
- Country of origin: United Kingdom
- Original language: English
- No. of series: 1
- No. of episodes: 6

Production
- Executive producers: Andy Harries; Jessica Burdett; Tim Bricknell; Sarah Pinborough; Vicky McClure; Börkur Sigthorsson
- Producer: Charlotte Essex
- Running time: 45–47 minutes
- Production companies: Build Your Own Films; Left Bank Pictures; Sony Pictures Television

Original release
- Network: Paramount+
- Release: 23 May – 20 June 2024

Insomnia is a British thriller television series by Sarah Pinborough, adapted from her 2022 novel. Starring Vicky McClure, it debuted on Paramount+ on 23 May 2024.

== Synopsis ==
A mother approaching her 40th birthday must investigate her past as she develops insomnia.

== Cast ==
- Vicky McClure as Emma
- Tom Cullen as Robert
- Smylie Bradwell as Will
- India Fowler as Chloe
- Leanne Best as Phoebe
- Corinna Marlowe as Patricia
  - Amy Marston portrays young Patricia
- Lyndsey Marshal as Caroline
- Dominic Tighe as Julian
- Jade Harrison as Michelle
- Robert Gilbert as Faisal
- Michelle Bonnard as DI Hildreth

== Production ==
The six-part series was commissioned in March 2023 and is based on the novel of the same name by Sarah Pinborough, with the author adapting the series herself. Andy Harries, Jessica Burdett, and Tim Bricknell are executive producers, while Charlotte Essex is series producer. It comes from production company Left Bank Pictures and has been directed by Börkur Sigthorsson. Pinborough and Sigthorsson are also executive producers.

There is additional production from Build Your Own Films and Vicky McClure is a producer on the series, as well as playing the lead role of Emma. Filming took place over three months and was finished in November 2023.

The cast includes Tom Cullen as Robert, husband of McClure's character Emma, with Smylie Bradwell and India Fowler as their children Will and Chloe, and Leanne Best as Emma's estranged sister Phoebe.

== Episodes ==
No.	Title	Directed by	Written by	Original release date
1	"Mummy?"	Börkur Sigthorsson	Sarah Pinborough	23 May 2024
2	"Bad Blood"	Börkur Sigthorsson	Sarah Pinborough	23 May 2024
3	"This Family is so Fucked Up"	Börkur Sigthorsson	Sarah Pinborough	30 May 2024
4	"Happy Birthday"	Börkur Sigthorsson	Sarah Pinborough	6 June 2024
5	"What Have You Done?"	Börkur Sigthorsson	Sarah Pinborough	13 June 2024
6	"Ah, There You Are"	Börkur Sigthorsson	Sarah Pinborough	20 June 2024
