= The Agency (2024 TV series) =

American spy thriller television series

- Also known as: The Agency: Central Intelligence
- Genre: Drama; Political thriller Spy thriller
- Created by: Jez Butterworth & John-Henry Butterworth
- Based on: Le Bureau des Legendes (The Bureau) by Éric Rochant
- Teleplay by: Jez Butterworth & John-Henry Butterworth
- Starring: Michael Fassbender; Jeffrey Wright; Jodie Turner-Smith; Katherine Waterston; Harriet Sansom Harris; John Magaro; Saura Lightfoot-Leon; Andrew Brooke; India Fowler; Reza Brojerdi; Alex Reznik; Richard Gere; Christian Ochoa Lavernia; Ambreen Razia
- Music by: Emilie Levienaise-Farrouch and Lindsay Wright
- Opening theme: "Love Is Blindness" covered by Jack White
- Country of origin: United States
- Original language: English
- No. of series: 2
- No. of episodes: 20

Production
- Executive producers: David C. Glasser; George Clooney; Grant Heslov; Joe Wright; Michael Fassbender; Jez Butterworth; John-Henry Butterworth; Ron Burkle; David Hutkin; Bob Yari; Ashley Stern; Pascal Breton; Alex Berger
- Producer: Simone Goodridge
- Running time: 44–60 minutes
- Production companies: The Originals Productions; Federation Studios; Smokehouse Pictures; 101 Studios; Paramount Television Studios (Note: Known as Showtime Studios for season 1.)

Original release
- Network: Paramount+ with Showtime
- Release: December 1, 2024 – present
- Network: Paramount+
- Release: June 21, 2026 – present

The Agency, previously known as The Agency: Central Intelligence, (Note: The series was originally titled as The Agency and that was the title used in the first season's title card. The Central Intelligence suffix was added when the series was added to the Paramount+ catalog for all subscribers, and as part of the season 2 renewal, but was dropped a month before the second season was to premiere on June 21, 2026.) is an American spy thriller television series created by Jez Butterworth and John-Henry Butterworth, executive produced by George Clooney and Grant Heslov and starring Michael Fassbender, Jeffrey Wright, Jodie Turner-Smith, and Richard Gere. The series premiered on December 1, 2024, on Paramount+ with Showtime, and is a remake of the acclaimed French television series The Bureau.

In December 2024, the series was renewed for a second season, which was released on June 21, 2026, on Paramount+ as a Paramount+ Original, with a subsequent airing on Paramount+ with Showtime on June 27.

== Premise ==
CIA officer "Martian" is ordered to abandon his undercover life and return to London Station. A past love unexpectedly reappears, pitting his mission and his real identity against his heart, hurling them both into a deadly game of international intrigue and espionage.

== Cast and characters ==
=== Main ===
- Michael Fassbender as Brandon Colby, codename "Martian", previously CIA NOC operative in Africa for six years, and now Deputy Director of Operations at London Station. He is known to Zahir by his former cover name Paul Lewis.
- Jeffrey Wright as Henry Ogletree, Martian's boss, mentor and CIA London Deputy Station Chief and Director of Operations. His official cover is the Foreign Service Support Attaché.
- Jodie Turner-Smith as Dr. Samia Fatima "Sami" Zahir, a Sudanese anthropology professor and Martian's love interest
- Katherine Waterston as Naomi Ford, Martian's former and Danny's current CIA case officer
- Harriet Sansom Harris as Dr. Rachel Blake, a CIA clinical psychologist assigned to London Station from Langley
- John Magaro as Owen Lublin, also known as Owen Taylor, Coyote's CIA case officer
- Saura Lightfoot-Leon as Daniela "Danny" Ruiz Morata, codename "Gremlin", a new CIA field officer undercover as a geophysics graduate to get on an exchange program to Tehran to identify Iranian nuclear engineers. Her cover identity is Daniela Moreno Acosta, a Spanish national.
- Andrew Brooke as Nick, codename "Grandpa", a CIA field agent and former Marine assigned with keeping tabs on Martian
- India Fowler as Poppy Cunningham, Martian's daughter
- Reza Brojerdi as Reza Mortazevi, an Iranian seismology professor secretly affiliated with the IRGC. Danny is assigned to get selected for his esteemed exchange program that will allow her to enter Iran with bona fide cover
- Alex Reznik as Piotr Rybak (season 1–2), (Note: In the second season, Reznik only appears in the first episode but is credited with the main cast.) codename "Coyote", a CIA non-official deep cover agent in Belarus
- Richard Gere as James Bradley, codename "Bosko", the CIA London Station Chief.
- Christian Ochoa Lavernia as Brian (season 2), codename "Grandma", a CIA field agent
- Ambreen Razia as Blair (season 2; recurring season 1), a CIA case officer

=== Recurring ===
- Adam Nagaitis as Grandma, a CIA field agent assigned with keeping tabs on Martian
- Bilal Hasna as Simon, a CIA technician at London Station
- Sabrina Wu as Raine Miller, a CIA analyst and Ogletree's personal assistant
- Ray BLK as Barbara, codename "Dozer", a CIA field agent
- Elena Saurel as Ms. Robinshaw
- Hugh Bonneville as James "Jim" Richardson, a senior MI6 official in charge of China Desk, later Chief, suspected MSS mole
- David Harewood as Dalaga, an RSF aligned Sudanese official negotiating a peace deal with China over control of East Africa

==== Season 1 ====
- Tom Vaughan-Lawlor as Ben, a senior CIA technician at London Station
- Edward Holcroft as Dr. Charlie Remy, Ogletree's brother-in-law, a Delta Force operator and deep cover agent in occupied Ukraine
- Sergej Onopko as Dr. Koval, SOF soldier undercover with Remy in Ukraine
- Oleksandr Rudynskyi as Sasha Boutenko, a SOF soldier undercover with Remy and Koval in Ukraine
- Kurt Egyiawan as Osman Abdel-Aziz, a Sudanese GIS operative assigned to keep track of Sami by her estranged husband
- Curtis Lum as Guo, a Chinese MSS operative

==== Season 2 ====
- Clayne Crawford as Vernon Crawford, an American codename "Viking", a former Marine working as a mercenary for a Russian PMC wanted by the CIA
- Keanush Tafreshi as Hassan Zamani, codename "Popeye", the hot-headed son of an Iranian government advisor
- Medalion Rahimi as Darya Rafhami, Zamani's fiancée and the daughter of a powerful mullah
- Thomas Coombes as Tom
- Raza Jaffrey as Craig, an Iran Desk analyst at the CIA London Station and Naomi's boyfriend
- Nasser Memarzia as Majid Zamani
- Tessa Ferrer as Captain Robyn Crawford, codename "Snow White", Viking's sister and a USAF nurse stationed at an RAF base in Suffolk

=== Guest ===
- Dominic West as the director of the CIA

==== Season 1 ====
- Alex Jennings as Frank, a senior CIA case officer and the previous London Station Deputy Director of Operations who originally recruited Coyote
- Annabel Mullion as Emily Ogletree, Henry's wife
- Violet Verigo as Sandy
- Marcin Zarzeczny as Alexei Orekhov, a trucking company owner and CIA asset in Belarus
- Jessie Mei Li as Rose
- Tim Samuels as Alex Kent-Jones, a professor at the Royal College of World Heritage

== Episodes ==
=== Series overview ===
Season	Episodes	Originally released		
Season	Episodes	First released	Last released	Network
1	10	December 1, 2024	January 26, 2025	Paramount+ with Showtime
2	10	June 21, 2026		Paramount+ / Paramount+ with Showtime (Note: The second season aired in its entirety on Paramount+ with Showtime on June 27, 2026)

=== Season 1 (2024–25) ===
No. overall	No. in season	Title	Directed by	Teleplay by	Original release date (Note: Episodes are released early for subscribers of the Paramount+ Premium plan.)
1	1	"The Bends"	Joe Wright	Jez Butterworth & John-Henry Butterworth	December 1, 2024
CIA agent Brandon ‘Martian’ Colby is suddenly recalled to London Station from a six-year covert assignment in Ethiopia. He leaves behind a lover, married Sudanese anthropologist Dr. Samia Zahir, and downplays his deep feelings for her with his handler Naomi. Now a case officer, Martian reconnects with his estranged daughter Poppy, and his boss and mentor Henry Ogletree, whilst being subject to CIA surveillance. When Samia visits London for work, Martian breaks protocol and meets her under his former cover identity Paul Lewis. Coyote, a valuable but alcoholic asset in Belarus, is arrested and disappeared. This places his handler Owen Taylor and Station Chief James ‘Bosko’ Bradley under pressure from Langley, as it is possible Coyote could compromise ongoing operations in Ukraine. Martian and Naomi prepare rookie agent Danny for an undercover assignment to get close to IRGC affiliated professor Reza Mortazavi at a London university. In the near future, an injured Martian is interrogated by an unseen woman.
2	2	"Wooden Duck"	Joe Wright	Jez Butterworth & John-Henry Butterworth	December 1, 2024
Martian and Samia sleep together, and she says she is in London for six months on a course at the Royal College of World Heritage. Charlie, Ogletree's brother-in-law, is a Delta Force operative in occupied Ukraine on a black-op with SOF soldiers Koval and Boutenko undercover as medical staff. Martian and visiting CIA psychologist Dr. Rachel Blake determine Coyote's contact Alexei, a trucking company owner affiliated with Russian PMC's, should be extracted. The CIA kidnaps him from Gdańsk whilst trying to flee to the US, and brings him to London. Concerned their cover is blown, Charlie and the Ukrainians exfil, killing many Russian Army soldiers and escape. However, after a complex enhanced interrogation, Martian deems Alexei is terrified, but legitimate and not compromised. Danny is given her cover identity, Daniela Moreno Acosta, by Naomi, and is instructed to be hired to work for Prof. Mortazevi, her mark, as a geophysics researcher. Naomi warns her of the impact of losing her identity.
3	3	"Hawk from a Handsaw"	Philip Martin	Jez Butterworth & John-Henry Butterworth	December 8, 2024
Martian escapes his tail and meets Samia at a hotel again. Ogletree confronts him, confirming he knows Martian is using the Paul Lewis identity to meet her, demanding he stop. Martian appears to oblige. Samia is unknowingly tailed by GIS agent Osman, working for her husband. Bosko confirms operation 'Felix' is a mission to extract the operatives in Ukraine, and has it authorised by the CIA Director. Poppy finds Martian’s fake Paul Lewis Pennsylvania ID hidden in his flat when hiding her weed. He warns her of the seriousness of his situation. Ogletree warns Naomi if Coyote is compromised, so is the CIA’s Ukraine operations. Charlie and the SOF are relieved by CIA operatives, and return to their medical cover in Ukraine. Blake interviews Martian about his transition from undercover. Martian conveys his belief that you naturally need to be insane to work for the agency. Martian and Samia meet at a cinema, and he begins to think she is under pressure.
4	4	"Quarterback Blitz"	Philip Martin	Jez Butterworth & John-Henry Butterworth	December 15, 2024
In a secret meeting in London, officials from Sudan, the EU and Saudi Arabia are negotiating a deal for China to take control of East Africa, including oil and a Suez Canal port. Samia is actually visiting to work at the conference, consulting on ensuring the various ethnic groups in the region will not be unduly impacted by the takeover. The meeting is unknown to the intelligence community, with Osman enforcing strict secrecy. Martian has technician Simon look into Samia's background, and discovers she is getting a divorce. A member of the Belarusian delegation in London opens a back channel with Martian to negotiate Coyote's return. Martian notices Osman tailing him whilst shopping with Poppy. Danny gets hired at the Institute of Geophysics, and starts planting seeds to be selected by Mortazevi to accompany him to Tehran on a research placement. Osman threatens Samia, who tells him Martian's Paul Lewis identity. The woman in the near future continues to interrogate Martian about his actions.
5	5	"Rat Trap"	Zetna Fuentes	Jez Butterworth & John-Henry Butterworth	December 22, 2024
Osman researches the Paul Lewis identity, and concludes Martian is a spy after he does not report being attacked by one of Osman's agents in an apparent mugging to the police. He asks MSS agent Guo, assisting with security at the talks, to help dispose of him. Martian starts investigating the real reason Samia is in London. After following her to the meeting building, he discovers via the agency and his senior MI6 contact Jim Richardson it is owned by a Chinese businessman with links to Xi Jinping. He ultimately deduces China is negotiating a deal with Sudan in secret. Owen travels to Minsk to search Coyote’s apartment and discovers a hidden message "Valhalla". The Belarusians indicate via the back channel that Coyote is leaking information, so Bosko has Owen extracted. Ogletree discovers Coyote was seeing a psychiatrist in Minsk without the agency's knowledge. Danny is captured, beaten and starved by CIA operatives for two days to test if she will blow her cover, but she does not break.
6	6	"Spy for Sale"	Zetna Fuentes	Jez Butterworth & John-Henry Butterworth	December 29, 2024
Martian and Ogletree conclude it is not the FSB or KGB RB who have Coyote. In exchange for a Cold War recording about the fate of his wife at the hands of the Stasi, former KGB general Novikov gives the CIA information. He tells them that Valhalla, a Russian mercenary group led by General Volchok, has Coyote in Belarus. They intend to hand him over to the Russian government in four days to curry favour with Putin, when the Deputy Defence Minister visits the Ukraine front line. In a call with the White House, Martian asserts they can get Coyote back, much to the chagrin of Bosko and Ogletree, who are doubtful of a rescue mission succeeding. Richardson, due to become Chief in a year, betrays Martian and tells Ogletree about the China-Sudan meetings. He suggests he no longer wants MI6 to be subordinate to the Americans. Martian evades being tailed by Guo and the MSS. Osman targets Poppy and threatens Martian after finding her student ID in the coat his agent took from him during the mugging.
7	7	"Hard Landing"	Grant Heslov	Jez Butterworth & John-Henry Butterworth	January 5, 2025
Dalaga, a Sudanese official leading the meetings, threatens Samia's family if she keeps evading Osman. A CIA agent monitoring Martian saves Poppy from being kidnapped by Guo. Martian is forced to reveal his enquiries into Samia to Ogletree, but keeps the true nature of their relationship secret and also has Poppy lie for him. He proposes the CIA recruit her as an asset. Blake suspects a deeper level of his involvement with Samia. Martian and Owen force Alexei to help them get close to Volchok, who uses his trucking company in Belarus. Under the pretence of telling Volchok he is being overcharged, Alexei meets with him and maintains his cover even when threatened. However, the paranoid Volchok suspects he is working for the Americans. Danny's colleague Jerome is given the Tehran placement, but she gets a CIA associate to threaten him into dropping out. To get Samia in a meeting alone, the CIA impersonate her university and threaten her work visa. Martian attends to recruit her, revealing himself to be a spy.
8	8	"Truth Will Set You Free"	Grant Heslov	Jez Butterworth & John-Henry Butterworth	January 12, 2025
Martian urges Samia to work for the CIA for protection and pass on information about the talks. Feeling betrayed and knowing her mother and sisters will be killed, she refuses and tells Osman, who takes her back to Sudan. Osman tells Dalaga, and Guo arranges to move the negotiations to Cairo. Guo is shown to be working with Richardson, who wants the UK to benefit from the East Africa takeover without American involvement. He gives Guo info on two Russian spies in the Department of Energy to give the CIA in exchange for them to back off investigating the negotiations, which Bosko accepts. Martian fights Guo to try and determine who he is working with. The CIA recruits Sylviya, Volchok's secretary, to replace his combat boots with tracker equipped duplicates. However, he catches and executes her. Danny's colleague Rose is chosen to replace Jerome, but Danny manipulates elements of her personal life to also have her drop out. Volchok joins a convoy transporting Coyote to the Ukrainian front.
9	9	"The Rubicon"	Neil Burger	Jez Butterworth & John-Henry Butterworth	January 19, 2025
Danny passes Reza's vetting and is selected to accompany him on the seismology placement. Naomi prepares her for interrogation on her cover identity when she goes to Iran. Osman sends Martian a video of him torturing Samia in prison, demanding the names of the dissidents he recruited in Ethiopia in exchange for her freedom. When Martian refuses, Osman suggests she will be killed. Both Blake and Naomi voice their concerns about Martian's mental state and honesty to Ogletree. Martian blackmails Volchok staffer Kravitsky into providing the Deputy Defence Minister's itinerary and has him arrange Coyote's handover to the FSB to take place at the medical clinic on the Ukrainian front. The Director approves for Charlie, Koval and Boutenko to be re-tasked. Instead of carrying out their original mission to kill the Deputy Defence Minister when he visits the clinic for a photo op, they are ordered to instead rescue Coyote and be extracted with help from SAC and JSOC. Boutenko and Koval disapprove of the reassignment.
10	10	"Overtaken by Events"	Neil Burger	Jez Butterworth & John-Henry Butterworth	January 26, 2025
Martian meets with Dalaga to try and make a deal in exchange for Samia's safety. Richardson and his subordinate Robinshaw run a rogue operation, and offer to try and rescue Samia if Martian becomes a double agent for him. Martian expresses reluctant interest, which is used to blackmail him. Distracted by his desperation to help Samia, Martian gets into an accident on his motorcycle and is hospitalised. The operation to extract Coyote does not go to plan, but is ultimately successful. Volchok and the Deputy Defence Minister are killed, but so is Boutenko. Charlie and Koval also survive and are extracted by SAC/JSOC operatives. Danny is let into Iran with Reza after a long interrogation by the IRGC, and informs Naomi. After undergoing surgery, Martian is interrogated by Richardson and Robinshaw about the full events of the past months. After the successful Coyote extraction, Martian returns to the agency as a hero, but has been threatened and blackmailed into becoming Richardson's informant there.

=== Season 2 (2026) ===
No. overall	No. in season	Title	Directed by	Teleplay by	Original release date
11	1	"Kick the Wasp's Nest"	Neil Burger	Jez Butterworth & John-Henry Butterworth	June 21, 2026
Two months later, the SAS fails to extract Samia from RSF custody in Khartoum. Martian gives MI6 details of Hannah Watson, a CIA analyst monitoring GCHQ, but vows to stop working for them after hearing of the botched rescue. During a debrief, Coyote is accused of becoming compromised whilst undercover. Danny reports from Iran that her colleague Zak is linked with the nuclear program. Zak is attacked at a party by Hassan Zamani, the son of a powerful government nuclear adviser Majid Zamani, and asks Danny to testify against him. Footage emerges of Kravitsky, a CIA asset who replaced Volchok as leader of Valhalla, being executed. The executioner is identified as Vernon “Viking” Crawford, a sadistic former Marine and Valhalla mercenary based in the Central African Republic who was close to Volchok. Bosko discovers that the Russians replaced the original target with the Deputy Defence Minister in Ukraine last minute, and suspects a leak. He instructs Ogletree investigate. MI6 locates Samia, and Martian offers to use the Iran operation to set up Hassan as a British source in exchange for her rescue.
12	2	"A Bear in Wolf's Clothing"	Neil Burger	Jez Butterworth & John-Henry Butterworth	June 21, 2026
Ogletree recruits Blake to help identify the mole. Viking sells a blood diamond in Antwerp for €3 million. Owen discovers Viking’s sister, Robyn and mother, Lizzy, work at Lakenstone, a RAF base in Suffolk. Bosko gives State Department representatives false information on Viking to see if they are behind the leak. Martian convinces Ogletree to make him Danny’s handler in place of Naomi. He instructs her to get closer to Hassan for recruitment, whilst keeping Zak on side. Danny gets Reza to intervene to resolve the conflict. Naomi asks her boyfriend Craig on the Iran desk to keep her updated on Danny. Owen goes undercover at Lakenstone to get close to Robyn, a USAF nurse. Lizzy is suspicious, but he gets Robyn interested in him by saying he is doing a Doctors Without Borders placement in Bangui. Samia pays a prison guard to deliver a letter to her family, but he discovers they have been arrested. Danny gets closer to Hassan and his girlfriend, Darya. Richardson informs Dame Veronica Rivington, the Chief of MI6, he will have an Iranian source within thirty days. Blake gives Ogletree a list of possible compromised operatives.
13	3	"Spymaster"	Grant Heslov	Jez Butterworth & John-Henry Butterworth	June 21, 2026
Robyn tells Owen she is scared her brother is working in Africa and wants to bring him home. Owen bugs her phone, and suggests she travel there with the charity to visit Viking, with the CIA hoping it will draw him out for capture. Samia is questioned by Saeed Al-Bukhatir, a Emirati SIA agent in Sudan, who asks her what Martian knows about the negotiations. Martian recruits an ambitious Blair to monitor Samia’s situation, and she obtains intel on Saeed from Indian intelligence. The IRGC, who are monitoring the more liberal Zamani’s, search Danny’s apartment and install remote viewing software on her laptop. Danny investigates Hassan’s relationship with his father, and is assigned to a seismic mapping expedition that his family funds. Martian discovers Viking left Brussels with a suitcase of cash, and deduces from CCTV where he sold the diamond. Impersonating a diamond company representative, he gets the name of the man who brokered the deal. Craig tells Ogletree of intel that the IRGC are targeting both Danny and the Zamani’s. He starts the extraction procedure, but not before Hassan and Danny are detained.
14	4	"Dead End"	Grant Heslov	Jez Butterworth & John-Henry Butterworth	June 21, 2026
Ogletree has technician Tom track his entire team's phones. Richardson meets with Dalaga to negotiate Samia’s release, and urges Martian to persist with recruiting Hassan. Danny is released and returns to London, claiming her grandmother has died. Hassan and Darya are also released, but a cautious Ogletree decides to stop targeting Hassan for recruitment. Martian goes behind his back and gets Danny to have Hassan and Darya visit London. Martian observes Hassan meeting with oil and gas executive Raymond Bidât, whose company works with the NIOC. Owen manipulates Robyn into telling Viking she is broke, and he agrees to meet her in the CAR to recruit her as a courier. Owen is apprehensive about accompanying her and the capture mission logistics. The CIA discovers Valhalla are purchasing land rich in rare earth minerals across Africa. Martian receives intel that Samia has been executed, but she is alive and released from custody by Osman. Danny meets a drunk Hassan and her surveillance team informs Ogletree. Robyn conspires online with Viking to kill Owen, revealing she knows he is an intelligence operative.
15	5	"Out Cold"	Zetna Fuentes	Jez Butterworth & John-Henry Butterworth	June 21, 2026
Ogletree discovers Martian went against his orders and fires him for insubordination. MI6 become aware and also grow worried Hassan won’t return to Iran, putting his recruitment and therefore Samia’s safety at risk. Bosko backs Ogletree in firing Martian, but orders that Danny remain on Hassan after discovering his father has been promoted. In the CAR, Robyn tries to contact Viking via a messageboard using Owen’s satphone, which is spotted by CIA technician Simon. Naomi has Darya’s family threatened, forcing her to break up with Hassan so Danny can get closer to him. Osman takes Samia to Abu Dhabi, where Saeed instructs her to return to the UK and advocate for the Government of Peace and Unity, otherwise her mother and sister will be killed. Ogletree confronts Martian, and warns he will discover why he betrayed him. With Martian's help, the CIA discover Robyn’s forum messages with user DeepBlue, an anglicisation of Viking’s unusual nom de guerre Siniyovich, confirming her treachery. Nigerian SBS operatives working for the African Union extract Owen, but they are killed en route to a UN airfield and he is captured by Valhalla operatives.
16	6	"Officially a Ghost"	Zetna Fuentes	Jez Butterworth & John-Henry Butterworth	June 21, 2026
Viking prepares to execute Owen, but stops when the CIA and AU send him a photo of his sister in custody. He instead maims his right leg with a sledgehammer, before exchanging him for Robyn at the Chad border. Impressed with his actions that helped save Owen, Bosko has Martian return unofficially to run a team to catch Viking, against Ogletree's wishes. He theorises Viking has been trained by the GRU to help Russia exert geopolitical control in Africa. Danny returns to Iran, with Hassan’s recruitment becoming top priority after his father is assigned to oversee the expansion of Fordow Uranium Enrichment Plant. Hassan later accepts a job co-managing the project. Naomi and Ogletree further investigate Martian, and discover the charity that assisted Samia’s release is linked to MI6. Ogletree also bugs a hospital examination room he knows to be used by the British for meetings with assets. Blair approaches Samia on behalf of Martian, and growing tired of defending the Hemedti regime she agrees to meet. Bosko has Ogletree assessed by Blake, believing his feud with Martian could be concealing something more sinister.
17	7	"Drown Him Then Throw Him a Lifejacket"	Neil Burger	Jez Butterworth & John-Henry Butterworth	June 21, 2026
Samia tells Martian her family has been kidnapped and he can’t help her. Martian turns Osman’s superiors against him by faking a political asylum application. Osman asserts his innocence to Dalaga, who reveals he is wearing a wire. Martian kills Saeed when he tries to target Osman, and offers Osman safety as a CIA asset in exchange for leaving Samia alone. Realising her usefulness as an asset, Bosko agrees to have Samia’s family extracted. At a safehouse, Samia and Martian struggle to reconcile their relationship. Martian plans to infiltrate the diamond smuggling operation to get to Viking by blackmailing Nils Jansen, a cocaine addicted diamond merchant, to work for them. Despite being pressured, Martian refuses to confirm Danny’s identity to MI6. Ogletree backtraces Martian's movements over the past year and obtains CCTV footage of him meeting Richardson. He has Blake further investigate Martian, where she grows impressed and shocked at his uncanny ability to lie. Hassan has Danny accompany him to an energy conference in Bahrain, where she sees him talking with MSS operative Li Wenyin and Richardson’s deputy Robinshaw.
18	8	"False Flag Attack"	Neil Burger	Jez Butterworth & John-Henry Butterworth	June 21, 2026
Viking carries out a false flag attack, framing the CIA for killing a DRC official in Kinshasa. This ruins recent American progress made in negotiating export of rare earth minerals, allowing Russia to be prioritised. Danny searches Robinshaw’s hotel room and clones the contents of a hidden laptop. Ogletree informs her the mission is now counterintelligence and therefore more dangerous, but she agrees to return to Tehran where Hassan impulsively proposes to her. Jansen agrees to work for Martian after being threatened, and a plan is formed to get him to the CAR near Viking. On orders from Martian, Osman lies when questioned by Naomi about how he and Samia reunited in London previously. With the laptop data, Ogletree identifies Robinshaw as MI6. He begins to confront Richardson at an inter-agency party, but it is then announced that he will succeed Rivington as Chief. Ogletree tells Samia that Martian betrayed his country due to his love for her. The IRGC arrests Hassan for espionage after detecting him messaging Li. To try and mitigate his punishment, his father informs them of his recent involvement with Danny, leading her to be arrested as well.
19	9	"Rogue Cell"	Grant Heslov	Jez Butterworth & John-Henry Butterworth	June 21, 2026
At Evin Prison, Hassan tells the IRGC that Danny is innocent but they continue to question her as a suspected Chinese asset. Richardson presents Bosko and the CIA Director with false evidence that Ogletree was passing Danny’s reports to China. Bosko has him detained by the Marine Security Guard, but Naomi is able to take paperwork from his safe before his office is locked down. Two JSOC ground operatives are executed in the CAR after a failed attempt on Viking. After hearing of Henry’s arrest and wanting to make things right, Martian leaves a written confession in his apartment and disappears after stealing plastic explosive and an unregistered handgun from London Station. He confronts Richardson, saying he never would have agreed to work for him knowing Danny’s intel was being passed to the Chinese. Accusing Richardson of being paid by the MSS since he was a junior officer in Hong Kong, Martian executes him. Naomi presents Henry’s evidence against Martian and Richardson to Bosko. After a silent goodbye to Samia, Martian boards a ferry crossing the English Channel.
20	10	"King Sacrifice"	Grant Heslov	Jez Butterworth & John-Henry Butterworth	June 21, 2026
Henry is released from custody and informed of both Martian’s confession and Richardson’s death. The CIA plans to exchange an imprisoned Quds Force financier for Danny. A conservative mullah who opposes the exchange orders the IRGC to instead stage an escape attempt and kill her. The attempt fails and Danny escapes on foot to a rural gas station outside of Mehriz and calls for extraction. She reluctantly kills the suspicious owner when he calls the police and is rescued by Mossad operatives. Martian adapts the plan to assassinate Viking and impersonates Jansen to fly to the CAR, threatening his colleague into playing along. Wanting Viking dead, the Director allows the mission to proceed. Instead of giving Viking a custom gift wristwatch packed with explosives, Martian plants C4 in a portable chess clock which detonates just as Viking determines he is an imposter at the end of a game of bullet chess. With Viking seemingly dead and without any backup, an injured Martian tries to shoot his way out of the Valhalla compound but is captured himself. An unidentified Russian confirms he is being kept alive as they know who he is. Bosko orders him to be recorded as dead, pending confirmation.

== Production ==
=== Development ===
The Agency is based on The Bureau, a French espionage show created, directed and produced by Éric Rochant. The storyline of its first two seasons closely follows that of The Bureau. The Agency initially had the title of The Department.

An American remake of The Bureau was first announced in April 2017, developed by Pascal Breton's Federation Entertainment. In February 2023, the project received a straight-to-series order from Showtime, now known as the Paramount+ with Showtime channel which is a part of the Showtime Networks portfolio.

The series is produced by George Clooney and Grant Heslov's Smokehouse Pictures, MTV Entertainment Studios and 101 Studios. It is executive produced by Keith Cox and Nina L. Diaz of MTVE Studios, David C. Glasser, Ron Burkle, David Hutkin and Bob Yari of 101 Studios, Alex Berger for The Originals Productions in France, and Ashley Stern and Pascal Breton for Federation Studios/Federation Entertainment of America.

Joe Wright directed the first two episodes with Jez Butterworth and John-Henry Butterworth writing all 10 episodes for season one. Clooney was originally set to direct.

In December 2024, the series was renewed for a second season. In June 2025, it was reported that the second season would be retitled The Agency: Central Intelligence. The Central Intelligence suffix was dropped prior to the release of second season.

=== Casting ===
Production started in June 2024, with the title changed to The Agency. Michael Fassbender is an executive producer, as well as in a starring role, played in the French series by Mathieu Kassovitz. Shortly afterwards, Jeffrey Wright, Richard Gere, Jodie Turner-Smith, Katherine Waterston and John Magaro joined the cast. Further cast members were revealed in August 2024, including Alex Reznik, Andrew Brooke, Harriet Sansom Harris, India Fowler and Saura Lightfoot-Leon.

In June 2025, Christian Ochoa Lavernia was cast as a new series regular while Keanush Tafreshi, Medalion Rahimi, Raza Jaffrey, and Tessa Ferrer were cast in recurring roles for the second season.

=== Filming ===
Filming took place in London in 2024. Brutalist buildings like the Barbican Estate illustrate the dark atmosphere.

Filming also took place in Tallinn, Estonia, in September 2024.

Filming also took place in Tangier, Morocco, in September 2025.

== Broadcast ==
The Agency premiered with the first two episodes on Paramount Global's premium streaming service Paramount+ for subscribers of the Paramount+ with Showtime plan on November 29, 2024 in the United States, before making its Showtime Networks debut which includes the Paramount+ with Showtime channel two days later, with worldwide streaming on Paramount+ on November 30.

The second season was released on June 21, 2026 on Paramount+, now labeled as a Paramount+ Original, before airing in its entirety on Paramount+ with Showtime on June 27.

== Reception ==
The review aggregator website Rotten Tomatoes reported a 68% approval rating for the first season with an average rating of 6.1/10, based on 40 critic reviews. The website's critics consensus is, "Emphasizing spycraft's heavy toll to both intriguing and tiresome effect, The Agency situates its all-star cast in a sumptuously-shot world of espionage." The second season has a 92% approval rating at Rotten Tomatoes. Metacritic, which uses a weighted average, assigned a score of 66 out of 100 based on 22 critics, indicating "generally favorable reviews".

In January 2025, Michael Fassbender was nominated for Lead Actor in Drama at the Irish Film and Television Awards.
