= Man vs Bee =

2022 British comedy television miniseries

- Promotional release poster
- Genre: Comedy; Slapstick
- Created by: Rowan Atkinson; William Davies
- Written by: William Davies
- Directed by: David Kerr
- Starring: Rowan Atkinson
- Composer: Lorne Balfe
- Country of origin: United Kingdom
- Original language: English
- No. of series: 1
- No. of episodes: 9

Production
- Executive producers: Chris Clark; William Davies
- Cinematography: Karl Óskarsson
- Editor: Mark Davies
- Running time: 10–19 minutes
- Production company: HouseSitter Productions

Original release
- Network: Netflix
- Release: 24 June 2022

Related
- Man vs Baby

Man vs Bee is a British comedy web series created and written by Rowan Atkinson and William Davies. The show consists of nine episodes, each of them directed by David Kerr. Atkinson stars as a down-on-his-luck man who finds himself entrenched in a battle with a bee while house sitting a rich couple's modern mansion. Jing Lusi, Claudie Blakley, Tom Basden, Julian Rhind-Tutt, Greg McHugh, and India Fowler also feature.

Man vs Bee premiered on Netflix on 24 June 2022 and received generally positive reviews from critics. A follow-up miniseries, Man vs Baby, was released on 11 December 2025.

== Premise ==
A house sitter named Trevor finds himself entrenched in an ongoing battle with a bumblebee while lodging in an elegant mansion, damaging expensive items in the house in his attempt to kill it, which fails.

== Cast and characters ==
- Rowan Atkinson as Trevor Bingley, a house sitter who finds himself in a battle with a bee as he causes irreparable damage.
- Jing Lusi as Nina Kolstad-Bergenbatten, the owner of the luxurious mansion that Trevor is house-sitting. She also owns a pet dog named Cupcake.
- Julian Rhind-Tutt as Christian Kolstad-Bergenbatten, Nina's husband.
- Greg McHugh as the gardener
- India Fowler as Maddy, Trevor's daughter
- Claudie Blakley as Jess, Trevor's ex-wife
- Tom Basden as the police officer

Additionally, Gediminas Adomaitis appears as Marek, Christian Alifoe as Karl, and Daniel Fearn as Lewis, the three burglars. Chizzy Akudolu appears as a judge, and Aysha Kala as a police detective.

== Episodes ==
No.	Title	Directed by	Written by	Original release date
1	"Chapter 1"	David Kerr	William Davies	24 June 2022
A couple, named Nina and Christian, hire a new house sitter, Trevor, to whom they show their precious belongings and a manual to control their smart mansion. Before leaving, they tell Trevor that the lock and unlock codes are the years of famous naval battles and in case of any mistake, only Nina's voice can control it. Soon, Trevor finds himself troubled by a bee and accidentally breaks a sculpture. He attempts to repair it while learning the controls for kitchen cabinets. Instead, he mistakenly leaves the manual on the burning stove while getting distracted by the couple's pet dog, Cupcake, who has managed to get inside the library which contains an incredibly expensive illuminated manuscript.
2	"Chapter 2"	David Kerr	William Davies	24 June 2022
Since Trevor does not remember the unlock codes, he tries breaking the glass with a hammer which bounces off of the glass and ends up tearing a nearby painting. He then starts mimicking Nina's voice and tries different codes until he finally manages to unlock the library and cleans up the mess made by Cupcake. Wanting to share the news about his new job, he keeps sending voicemails to his daughter, Maddy, until she finally calls him back at night and reminds him of his promise to take her on a holiday. After the call, he goes to sleep in the maid's room but sees the bee's shadow through the door. As he opens the door to catch the bee, the emergency alarm activates as he has not used the code; he confusingly tries different codes to turn off the alarm.
3	"Chapter 3"	David Kerr	William Davies	24 June 2022
The next morning, Trevor wakes up for breakfast but is interrupted by a police officer asking about the emergency alarm. While he tries to clarify the situation to the officer, he is disturbed by the bee which has got inside his pants. As the officer leaves, Trevor takes off his pants to capture the bee inside but forgets to zip them, allowing the bee to escape. Next, he sets a peanut butter trap in the microwave oven and manages to lure the bee inside. Meanwhile, Nina calls Trevor to inquire about the alarm, and Cupcake, who has managed to get a taste of the peanut butter starts farting because of allergies. Trevor ends the call and releases the bee into the garden instead of killing it. Trevor however manages to lock himself out while the bee is able to re-enter.
4	"Chapter 4"	David Kerr	William Davies	24 June 2022
Trevor realizes that Cupcake has a smart collar used to unlock the pet flap, so he brings a cat into the dog's sight and gets the collar. While he tries to enter through the pet flap, he falls into Cupcake's faeces. As he sees the bee, Trevor takes chase with a kitchen mixer, however, the machine rolls into the decoration piece. He follows the bee in the chimney but is again interrupted by the officer, who informs him about the burglars operating in that area, while Trevor was covered in chimney ash. Jess calls Trevor to remind him about their daughter's plan; instead, he shares with her about that bee, which she thinks does not matter. He tries to clarify he cannot meet Maddy until next week as he is busy with his job.
5	"Chapter 5"	David Kerr	William Davies	24 June 2022
Trevor enters the master bathroom and takes shower with a pleasant music. While enjoying, he is shocked to see the bee again and washes it out. He follows it to the master bedroom with a blow dryer, after which he traps it in the grand piano with an autoplay system. However, the bee still survives, which Trevor now captures in a vacuum machine. Thinking that the bee should be in the dust bag, he burns it while practicing yoga. However, the bee instead comes out from the machine's pipe.
6	"Chapter 6"	David Kerr	William Davies	24 June 2022
Trevor now cleans up the house and alternately fixes all the mess he made, after which he gets a beer and goes to bed where Maddy calls him before sleeping; he shares he has planned for a campsite visit. Meanwhile, the burglars break in by hacking the system and distracting the dog, but find out that all precious items are looking fake. Trevor overhears some noise but finds the bee in the toilet and he starts ranting for it, after which he locks the system without knowing that burglars have broken in, who have hidden in the library.
7	"Chapter 7"	David Kerr	William Davies	24 June 2022
The next morning, the police arrived following a suspicious car outside and come to know that the burglars have been locked in for hours, so they are arrested. Trevor's statement is recorded in an inquiry where he clarifies not knowing anything suspicious. Trevor then again sets a trap for the bee using peanut butter bread in the dog food cabinet while trying to keep the dog away. However, the dog and the bee both are trapped and lose consciousness as Trevor unloads different inflammable sprays. Nina, wondering about Cupcake, calls Trevor after getting an update from the police, to whom Trevor barely tries to satisfy. He hangs up Nina and searches for the vet to take the dog; meanwhile, the bee revives.
8	"Chapter 8"	David Kerr	William Davies	24 June 2022
As Trevor rushes to a vet in the car, he gets interrupted by the bee while driving. After returning with the recovered dog, he damages the car in search of the bee. Soon, he realizes the damage and watches a video on the life of solitary bees and learns that the male bees keep wandering around as they are forced to leave their only homes by the female bees. In the backyard, Trevor works on his idea. He fixes a wooden showpiece, uses honey cans, and mixes sugar with weed killer. The idea is revealed to be making a bomb.
9	"Chapter 9"	David Kerr	William Davies	24 June 2022
As he gets the bee in his trap, Trevor launches the explosion due to which the dog is trapped under the falling showpiece and the damaged car breaks out of the garage. Trevor, however, is shocked to see that the bee survived; he now sets the house on fire, following the bee with a Propane cylinder. Meanwhile, the returning couple, Nina and Christian, witness all of this and results in him being convicted with 14 counts, after which he is sentenced to three years imprisonment. Three months later, in jail, he overhears the burglars talking about Christian who paid them for the robbery and has claimed fake insurance of millions of pounds. On Trevor's complaint, the police arrest Christian, who was hosting an art gallery at his place. Trevor is released and rewarded and takes his daughter to a campsite. While having snacks, he again gets interrupted by the bee and once again tries to kill it.

== Production ==
=== Development ===
Man vs Bee was created by Atkinson and William Davies. The series was written by Davies, and directed by David Kerr. Davies had "been unsuccessfully pitching bee battles to Atkinson for years". Atkinson described the process as creating a story "roughly the length of a movie", then editing to 10 episodes. The editing process included creating cliffhangers for the end of episodes that would not be needed for a movie. Atkinson said the series was inspired by a segment of Mr. Bean from 1992. Atkinson described his character as "different" to Mr. Bean, "much nicer and much sweeter and more normal person" with a "weak spot" of "obsessiveness", compared to Mr. Bean's "self-centred, narcissistic anarchist". The first script meeting occurred just over three years before, and filmed a year before, release. While promoting the series, Kerr left the possibility of a second season open.

=== Filming ===
The series was filmed over 12 weeks, the interior scenes at Bovingdon Studios, Hertfordshire, and exterior scenes throughout Hertfordshire and Buckinghamshire. They could not film in a real house due to COVID-19 concerns by homeowners. Branded products were used to illustrate "the couple's luxury lifestyle", though were not paid for by brand owners. The show borrowed "the oldest surviving Jaguar E-Type" from its owner, but created a replica for Atkinson's character to destroy. The Bee was either a physical model, or computer-generated by Framestore, depending on whether the Bee was static.

=== Music ===
The series was composed by Lorne Balfe, and the 20-track soundtrack was released alongside the series on 24 June 2022.

== Release ==
The series was announced on 13 December 2020. The cast and release date were announced on 14 April 2022. The trailer for the series was released 26 May 2022. Nine episodes were released on Netflix 24 June 2022. Promotion for the series included a billboard in Manchester, and a Beano comic strip by Nigel Parkinson. Three sculptures of Atkinson were created and unveiled at St Paul's Cathedral to promote the series and raise awareness for the issues faced by "native species of British bees and pollinators".

== Reception ==
=== Audience viewership ===
The series was viewed for 18.2 million hours across its opening weekend, ranking tenth globally on Netflix for the week ending 26 June 2022. By 3 July 2022, the series had been viewed for 25.4 million hours and risen to seventh on Netflix globally for the preceding week.

=== Critical response ===
On the review aggregator website Rotten Tomatoes, 74% of 23 critics' reviews are positive, with an average rating of 5.9/10. Metacritic, which uses a weighted average, assigned the series a score of 69 out of 100, based on six critics, indicating "generally favorable" reviews.

Atkinson's performance has been praised by critics. Stuart Jeffries of The Guardian argued Atkinson was "intentionally funny in all nine episodes". James Hibbs of Radio Times argued he "doesn't stray from his trademark, cringe-inducing slapstick hijinks" and he "does it better than anyone". Anita Singh of The Telegraph said he has "lost none of his skill". Joel Keller of Decider argued "this series shows off all the skills that have made his career so successful" and "the times when Atkinson gets very physical" is a highlight. Ben Dowell of The Times described Atkinson's performance as "reassuringly familiar" and "commandingly skilful as you would expect", but less enjoyable to watch screw things up than Mr. Bean can be. Steve Bennett of Chortle said "Atkinson remains a master of this genre".

However, Imogen West-Knights of New Statesman argued Atkinson in Man vs Bee does not reach "the queasy delights of Bean". Hibbs criticised the series for being too long and pacing lulling in the middle, West-Knights similarly criticised the release format. Vicky Jessop of Evening Standard argued the plot wears thin by the end of the first episode, and the others are too long. Jeffries, and West-Knights, criticised the lack of characterisation for the Bee. Jeffries, Sean O'Grady of The Independent, and Camilla Long of The Times, criticised the product placement.

== Sequel ==
The sequel series Man vs Baby was announced to be in production in December 2024. It was released on 11 December 2025.
