= The Trial (2025 film) =

British television drama

- Genre: Drama
- Screenplay by: Mark Burt
- Directed by: Michael Samuels
- Starring: Saoirse-Monica Jackson; Ben Miles; Claire Skinner
- Country of origin: United Kingdom
- Original language: English

Production
- Producers: Richelle Wilder; Isibéal Ballance
- Production company: Adorable Media

Original release
- Network: Channel 5
- Release: 8 May 2025

The Trial is a 2025 single-episode British television drama directed by Michael Samuels from a screenplay by Mark Burt. Produced by Adorable Media, an independent production company based in London, it was broadcast on Channel 5 on 8 May 2025. Starring Saoirse-Monica Jackson, Ben Miles, and Claire Skinner, it is set in the near-future in the UK in which parents are legally liable for the crimes committed by their children.

== Premise ==
The drama is set in the UK in 2035, when parents are held legally responsible for the crimes committed by their children. The drama shows teenager Teah on trial for a serious crime, putting her parents Dione and David Sinclair in the centre of a distressing legal battle against the Office of Judicial Inquisition, a powerful new division of the Ministry of Justice.

== Cast ==
- Saoirse-Monica Jackson as Sarah Willis
- Ben Miles as David Sinclair
- Claire Skinner as Dione Sinclair
- India Fowler as Teah Sinclair
- Jaz Hutchins as Lieutenant Simons

== Production ==
The Trial was announced by Channel 5 in March 2025, as part of a new policy by the channel to commission one-off television dramas. A one-off 60-minute television drama, The Trial is produced by Richelle Wilder and Isibéal Ballance of Adorable Media (The Amazing Mr Blunden, Woman of Stone). The director is Michael Samuels and the screenplay was written by Mark Burt.

The cast is led by Saoirse-Monica Jackson as an investigator of parents played by Ben Miles and Claire Skinner, with Jaz Hutchins and India Fowler also members of the cast.

== Broadcast ==
The Trial aired in the United Kingdom on Channel 5 on 8 May 2025.
