= How to Train Your Dragon (2010 film) =

2010 DreamWorks Animation film

- Theatrical release poster
- Directed by: Chris Sanders; Dean DeBlois
- Screenplay by: Will Davies; Dean DeBlois; Chris Sanders
- Based on: How to Train Your Dragon by Cressida Cowell
- Produced by: Bonnie Arnold
- Starring: Jay Baruchel; America Ferrera; Gerard Butler; Craig Ferguson; Jonah Hill; Christopher Mintz-Plasse; Kristen Wiig; T.J. Miller
- Edited by: Darren T. Holmes; Maryann Brandon
- Music by: John Powell
- Production company: DreamWorks Animation
- Distributed by: Paramount Pictures (Note: In July 2014, the film's distribution rights were purchased by DreamWorks Animation from Paramount Pictures and transferred to 20th Century Fox before reverting to Universal Pictures in 2018 following NBCUniversal's acquisition of DreamWorks Animation in 2016.)
- Release dates: March 21, 2010 (Gibson Amphitheater); March 26, 2010 (United States)
- Running time: 98 minutes
- Country: United States
- Language: English
- Budget: $165 million
- Box office: $494.9 million

How to Train Your Dragon is a 2010 American animated fantasy film directed by Chris Sanders and Dean DeBlois and written by Sanders, DeBlois, and Will Davies, based on the 2003 novel by British author Cressida Cowell. Produced by DreamWorks Animation, the film stars the voices of Jay Baruchel, America Ferrera, Gerard Butler, Craig Ferguson, Jonah Hill, Christopher Mintz-Plasse, Kristen Wiig, and T.J. Miller. The story takes place in Berk, a mythical Viking village. Hiccup (Baruchel), an undersized teen misfit and son of the village chieftain, wishing to become a dragon slayer like the other Vikings, injures a rare Night Fury dragon but refuses to bring himself to kill it. He instead helps and befriends the dragon, and quickly discovers that things are not exactly as they seem in the conflict between Vikings and dragons.

In 2004, the book series began attracting the attention of executives at DreamWorks Animation. After the success of Over the Hedge (2006), producer Bonnie Arnold became interested in the newly acquired property. The directors of the film wanted to ensure they took advantage of the improvisation abilities of the secondary cast by frequently bringing them together in the recording sessions. The filmmakers hired cinematographer Roger Deakins as a visual consultant to help them with the aesthetics of the film and to add a live-action feel. John Powell composed the film's musical score.

How to Train Your Dragon premiered at the Gibson Amphitheater on March 21, 2010, and was released in the United States on March 26 by Paramount Pictures. The film was a commercial success, earning $495 million and becoming the tenth-highest-grossing film of 2010. It received critical acclaim and is frequently lauded as one of the best animated films ever made. It also received numerous accolades, including two Academy Award nominations, and spawned a multimedia franchise, including two sequels, How to Train Your Dragon 2 (2014) and How to Train Your Dragon: The Hidden World (2019). A live-action remake was released in 2025.

== Plot ==
The Viking village of Berk is frequently attacked by dragons that steal livestock and endanger the villagers. Hiccup, the 15-year-old son of the village chieftain, is deemed too weak to fight by Stoick, so he creates mechanical devices under apprenticeship with Gobber, the village blacksmith who is also Stoick's best friend and advisor. Hiccup uses a bolas launcher to shoot down a Night Fury, a rare dragon, during a dragon raid, but nobody believes him. He enters the forest and finds the Night Fury but cannot bring himself to kill the dragon. Instead, he sets the creature free. The Night Fury then suddenly pins Hiccup down, but to Hiccup's surprise, the dragon spares him.

Before leaving with his fleet to find and destroy the dragons' nest, Stoick enrolls Hiccup in a dragon-fighting class with fellow teenagers Fishlegs, Snotlout, twins Ruffnut and Tuffnut, and Astrid, on whom Hiccup has a crush. Facing little success in the class in the first two lessons, Hiccup returns to the forest and finds the Night Fury in a cove, unable to fly because Hiccup's bolas tore off half of his tail fin. Hiccup gradually befriends the dragon, naming him "Toothless" after his retractable teeth, and designs a harness and prosthetic fin that allows Toothless to fly with Hiccup riding atop his back.

Learning dragon behavior from Toothless, Hiccup manages to pass the training by subduing the dragons, earning admiration from his peers but sparking suspicion and jealousy from Astrid. Stoick's fleet returns home unsuccessful. When Hiccup learns that he must kill the Monstrous Nightmare for his final exam, he tries to run away with Toothless, but Astrid discovers them, and Hiccup takes her on a flight to demonstrate that Toothless is friendly. During the flight, Toothless is hypnotically drawn to the dragons' nest, where an evil gigantic dragon named the Red Death summons relatively smaller dragons to feed it copious amounts of live food to avoid being eaten themselves. Realizing the dragons have been forced to attack Berk to survive, Astrid wishes to tell the village, but Hiccup advises against it to protect Toothless.

In his final exam, Hiccup faces the captive Monstrous Nightmare and tries to subdue it to prove that dragons can be peaceful. When Stoick unintentionally enrages the dragon into attacking, Toothless arrives to protect Hiccup but is captured. Outraged, Stoick confronts Hiccup until he inadvertently tells him the location of the Dragon's Nest. Thinking Hiccup betrayed the village, Stoick rashly disowns his son as punishment for befriending a dragon and prepares the fleet using Toothless as a guide to search and destroy the nest after Hiccup tells him that Toothless brought him to the island. Astrid prompts Hiccup to realize he spared Toothless out of compassion, not weakness. Regaining his confidence, Hiccup shows his new friends how to befriend the training dragons, and they set out after their tribesmen.

Stoick and his Vikings locate and break open the dragons' nest, awakening the giant Red Death, which easily overwhelms them. Hiccup and his friends ride in on the training dragons, distracting the monster. Hiccup attempts to free Toothless, and Stoick, realizing his horrible mistake and his son was telling the truth, rescues and apologizes to both Hiccup and Toothless, telling Hiccup he is proud of him as his son. In a fierce midair battle, Hiccup and Toothless set the Red Death's mouth ablaze and destroy its wing membranes, causing it to smash into the volcano fatally and explode. Whilst escaping the resulting explosion, Hiccup gets knocked off Toothless. He is saved by Toothless, but loses his left foot in the process.

Some time later, Hiccup awakens back in Berk and finds dragons frolicking in the village and Gobber having fashioned new prosthetics for him and Toothless. Hiccup is now admired by his village, including Astrid, who at first punches him in the arm for scaring her before kissing him. Berk begins a new era of humans and dragons living in peace.

== Voice cast ==
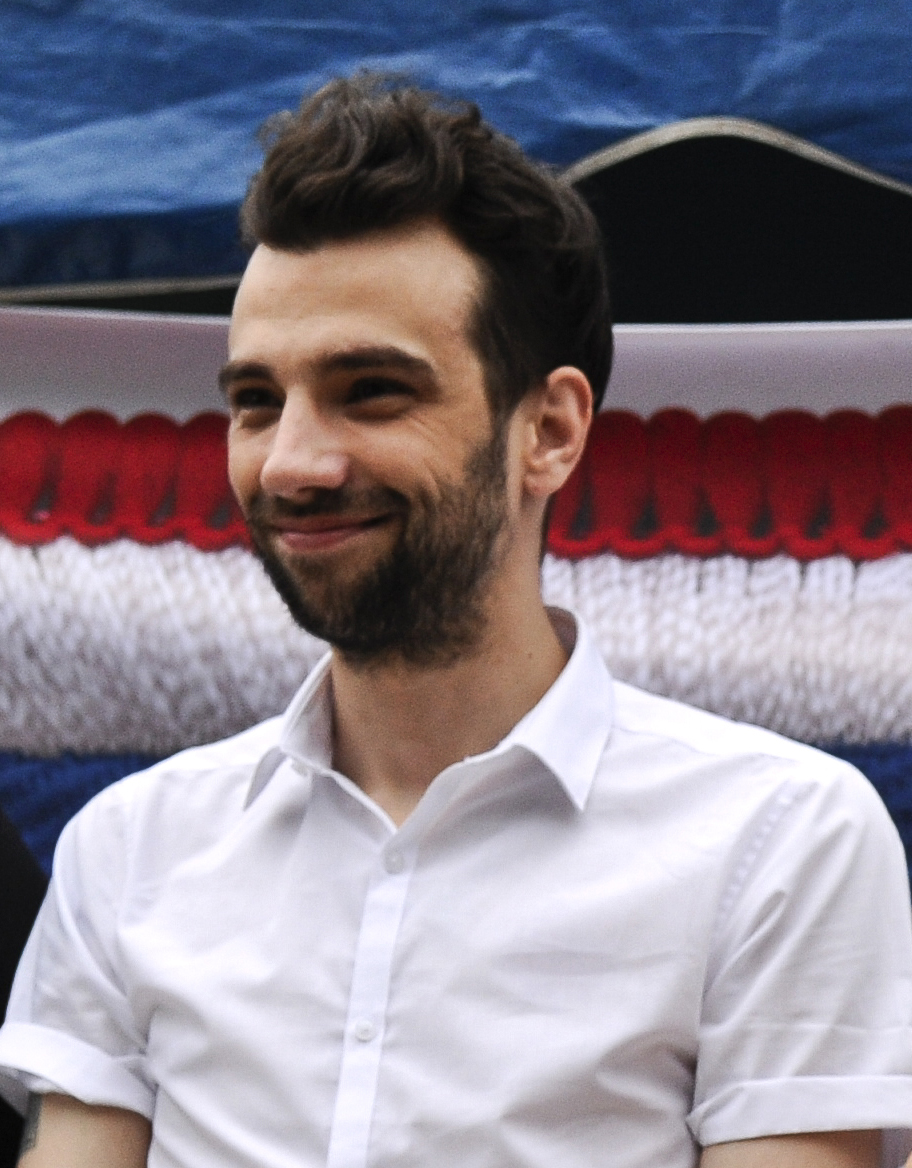
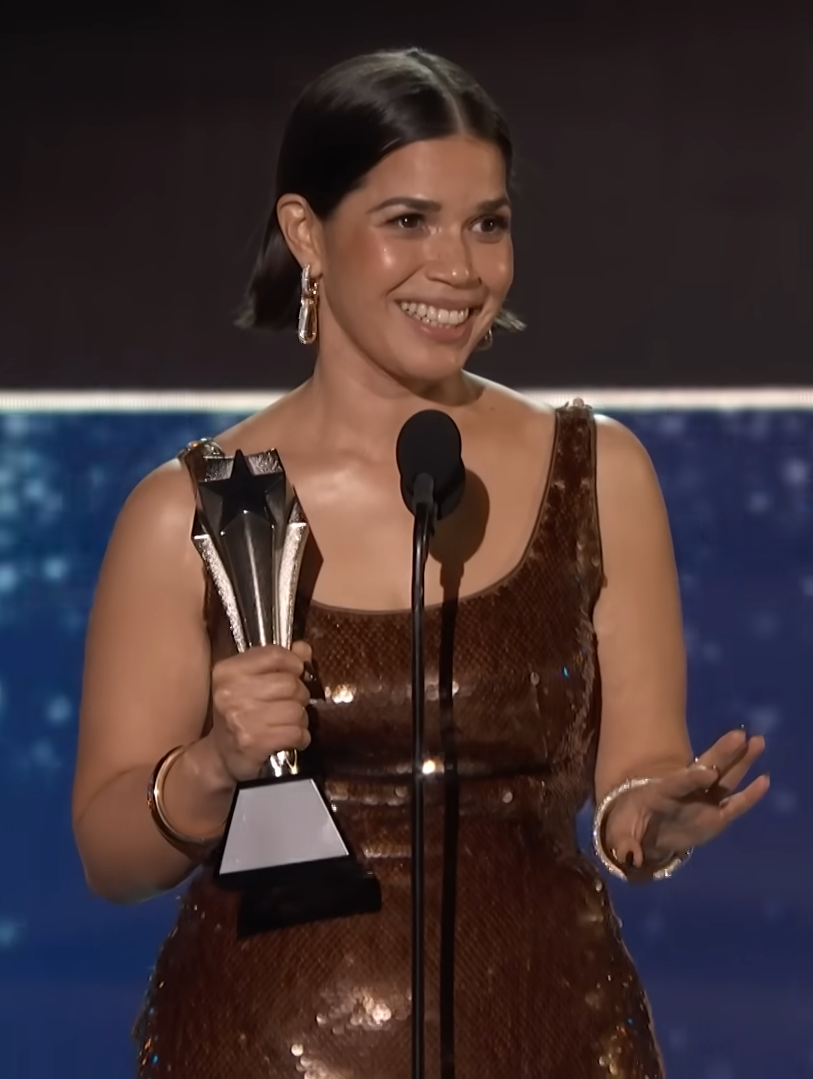
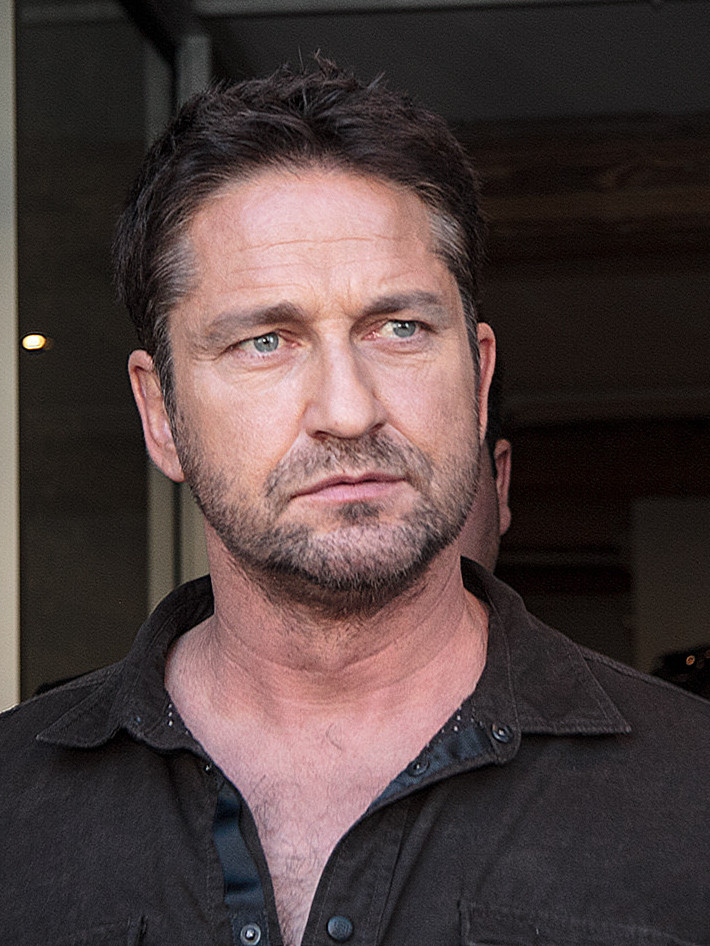
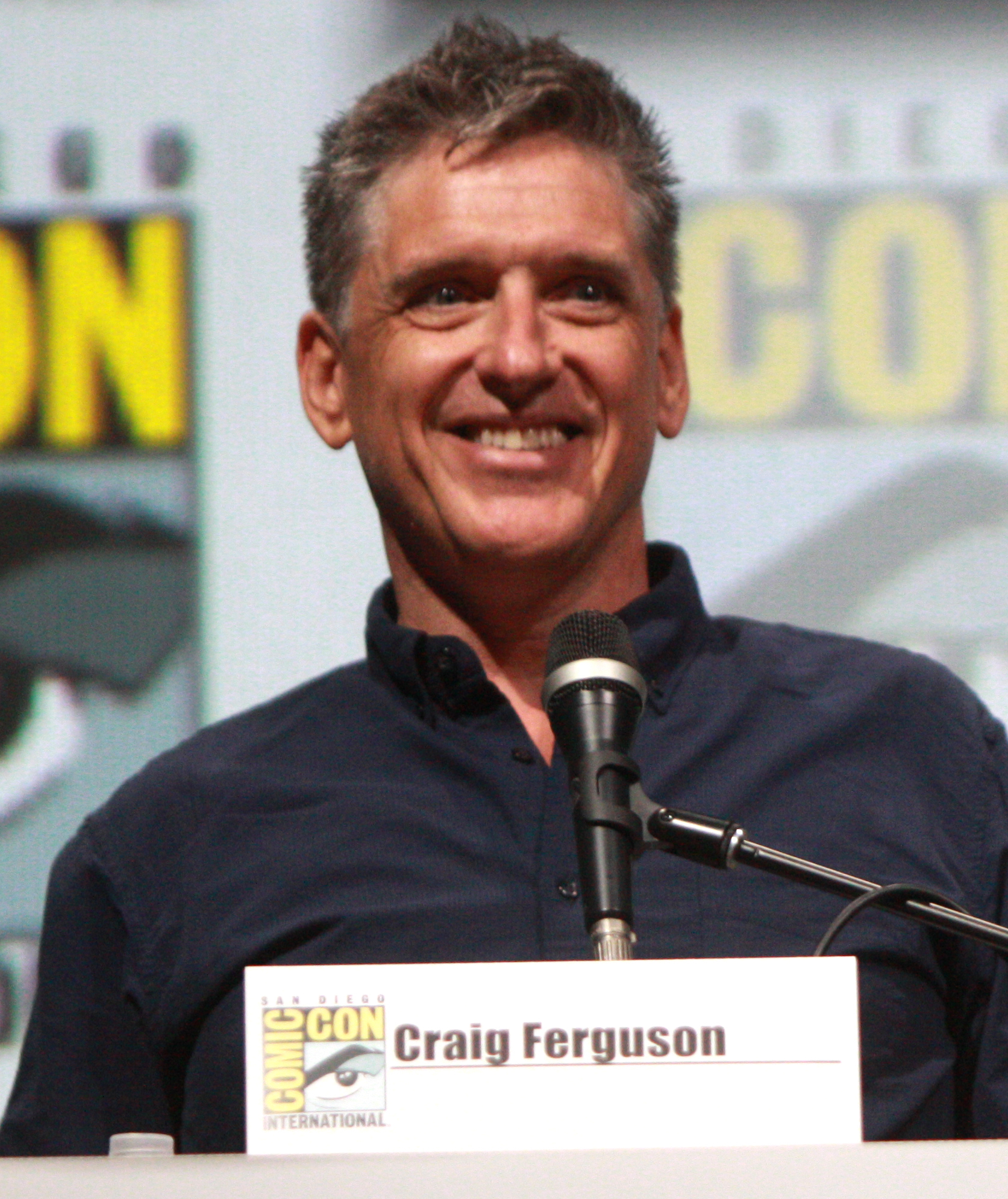
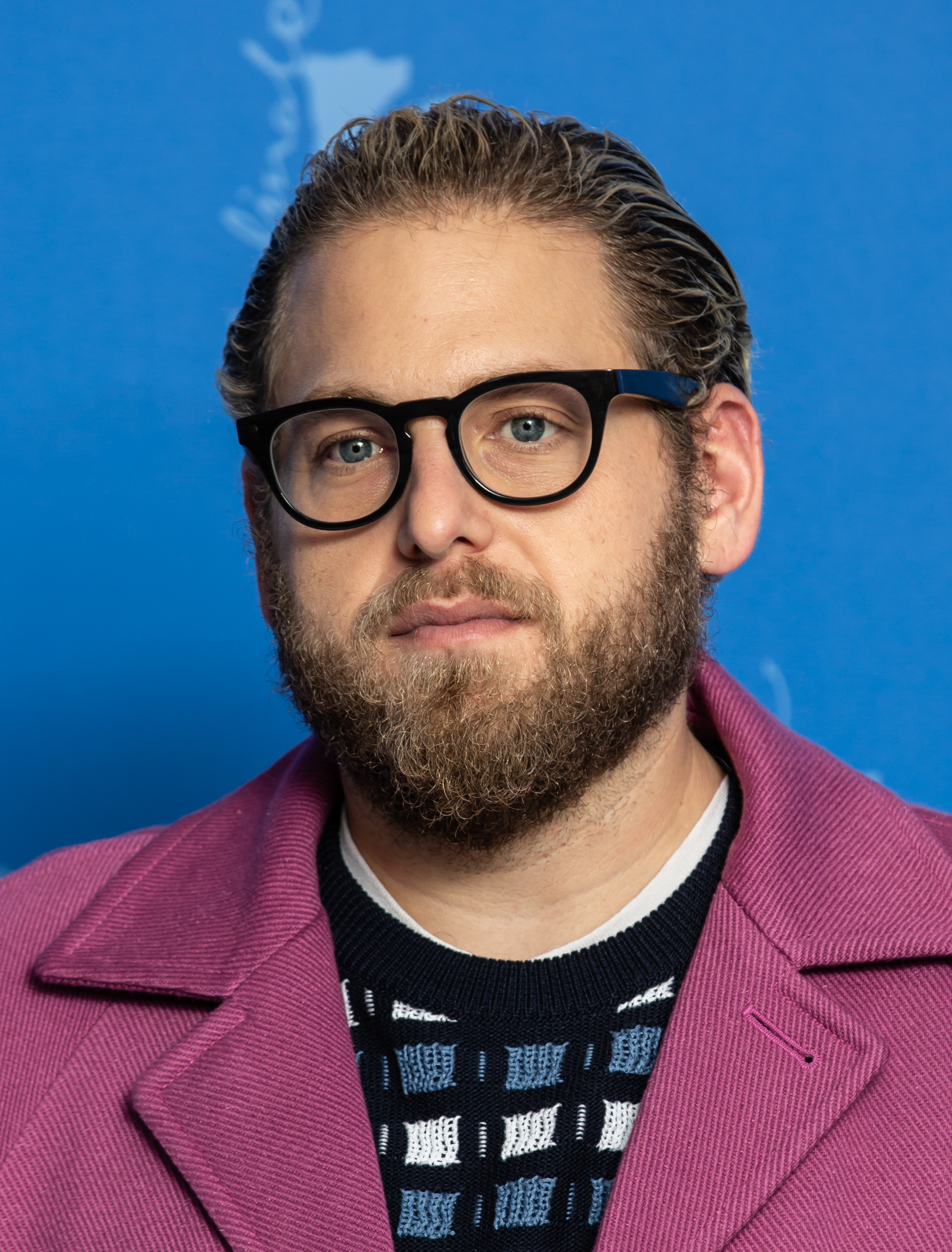
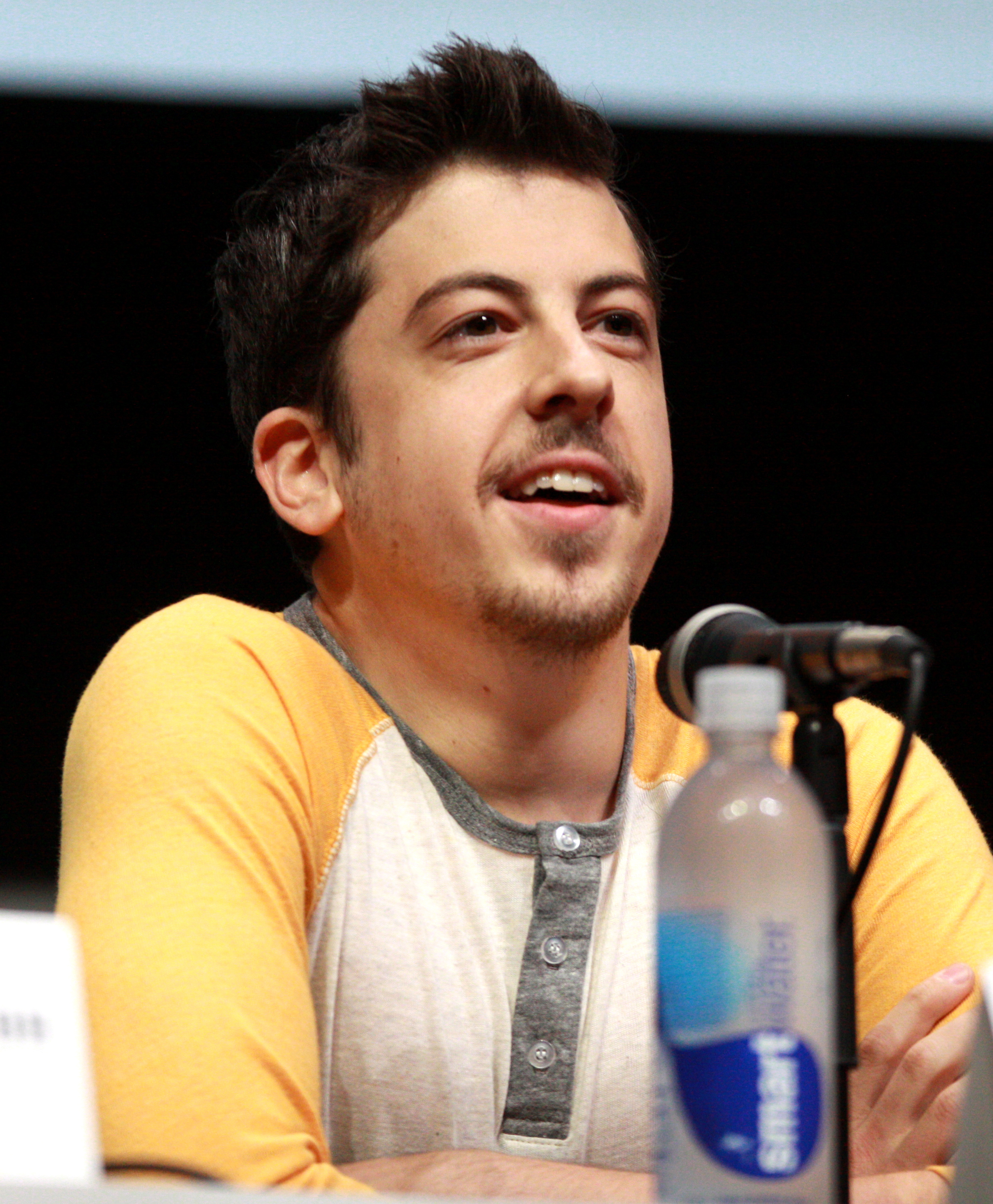
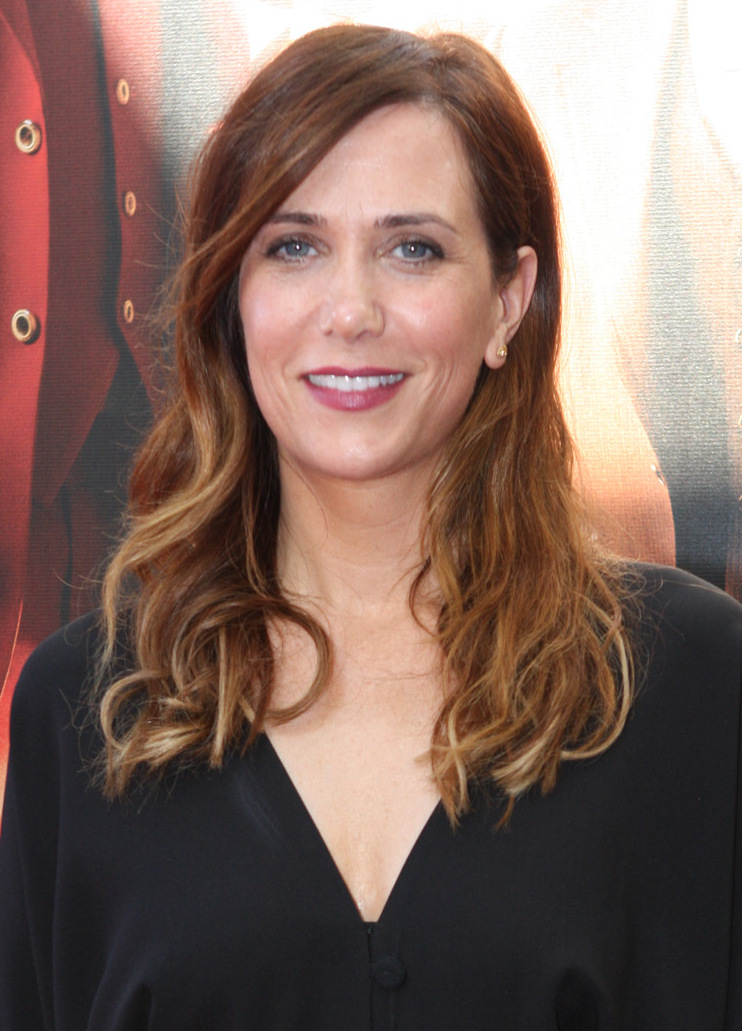
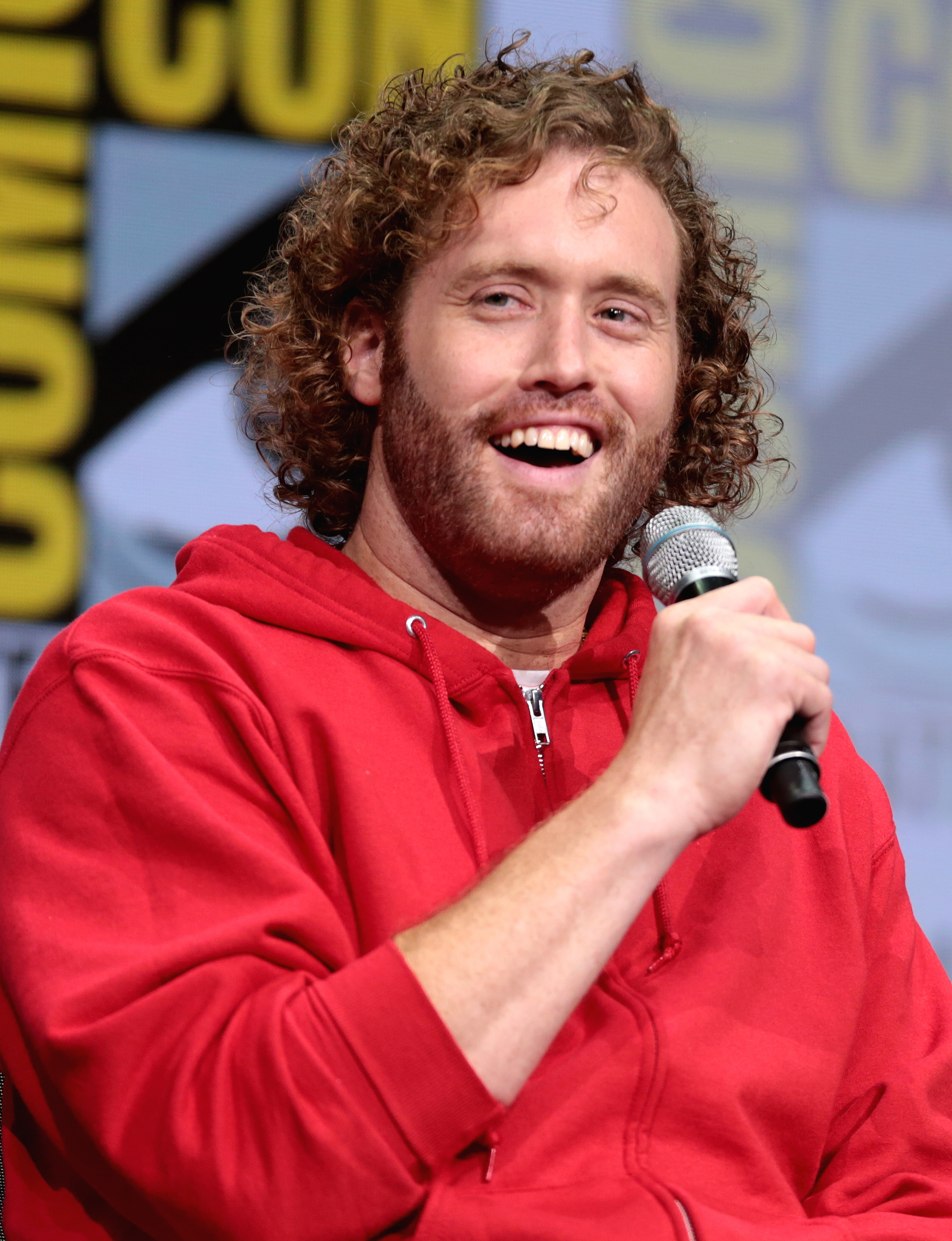
Top row: Jay Baruchel, America Ferrera, Gerard Butler and Craig Ferguson voices Hiccup, Astrid, Stoick and Gobber.
Bottom row: Jonah Hill, Christopher Mintz-Plasse, Kristen Wiig and T.J. Miller voices Snotlout, Fishlegs, Ruffnut and Tuffnut.
- Jay Baruchel as Hiccup Horrendous Haddock III, the awkward son of Stoick the Vast.
- Randy Thom provides the vocal effects for Toothless, Hiccup's faithful Night Fury, and Stormfly, Astrid's Deadly Nadder.
- America Ferrera as Astrid Hofferson, Hiccup's fellow student in dragon training and his love interest.
- Gerard Butler as Stoick the Vast, the viking leader of Berk and Hiccup's father.
- Craig Ferguson as Gobber the Belch, Berk's blacksmith, a close friend of Stoick's, and teacher of the tribe's young dragon-training recruits.
- Jonah Hill as Snotlout Jorgenson, one of Hiccup's dragon-training classmates. Snotlout is brash, overconfident, and fairly unintelligent, but reliable.
- Christopher Mintz-Plasse as Fishlegs Ingerman, an enthusiastic youth knowledgeable in dragon lore which he often relates in role-playing game style.
- Kristen Wiig as Ruffnut Thorston, Tuffnut's quarrelsome twin sister.
- T.J. Miller as Tuffnut Thorston, Ruffnut's quarrelsome twin brother.
- David Tennant as Spitelout Jorgenson, Snotlout's father. He is Stoick's aide and deputy.
- Ashley Jensen as Phlegma the Fierce, a female Viking.
- Kieron Elliott as Hoark the Haggard, a Viking with a knotted beard.
- Robin Atkin Downes as Ack, a blond-bearded Viking.
- Philip McGrade as Starkard.

== Production ==
Early production concept artwork of Toothless and Hiccup

The book series by Cressida Cowell began coming to attention to the executives at DreamWorks Animation in 2004. Coming off her success in Over the Hedge, producer Bonnie Arnold shortly became interested in the newly acquired property. She kept focusing on the project as time went on, and when DreamWorks Animation co-president of production Bill Damaschke asked her what she wanted to work on next, she chose "How to Train Your Dragon".

Future Dog Man writer and director Peter Hastings was one of the original directors of the film following both DreamWorks vets turned directors: Spirit: Stallion of the Cimarron helmer Lorna Cook and future Turbo, Captain Underpants: The First Epic Movie and Under the Boardwalk helmer David Soren. Earlier versions of the film followed the novel closely but DreamWorks Animation decided that the story skewed too much towards younger viewers, which could negatively impact potential box-office revenue, and Cook, Soren and Hastings were respectively removed but received "Special Thanks" credit afterwards. Damaschke hired Chris Sanders to take over, who in turn called Dean DeBlois, with whom he had worked on Disney's Lilo & Stitch, to co-direct. The original plot has been described by DeBlois as "heavily loyal to the book," but was regarded as being too "sweet" and "whimsical" and geared to a younger demographic. In the novel, Hiccup's dragon, Toothless, is believed to be a Common or Garden Dragon, a small breed. In the film, Toothless is an injured Night Fury, the rarest species of all dragons, far faster, aerodynamic and more powerful than the other species, and is large enough to serve as a flying mount for both Hiccup and Astrid. The filmmakers hired cinematographer Roger Deakins (known for frequently collaborating with the Coen brothers) as a visual consultant to help them with lighting and overall look of the film and to "add a live-action feel". Extensive research was done to depict both flight, as the directors knew they would be the biggest draw of the film's 3D effects, and fire, given animation could break away from the limitations seen in live-action films, where propane flames are usual due to being easier to extinguish. The dragons' designers made sure to create animals that were comical and also innovative compared to other dragon fiction. Toothless in particular tried to combine various dragon traits in a black panther-inspired design, that also had large ears and eyes to convey emotion better.

The directors made sure to cash in on the improvisation abilities of the secondary cast—Christopher Mintz-Plasse, Jonah Hill, Kristen Wiig and T.J Miller—by frequently bringing them together in the recording sessions.

== Music ==
John Powell returned to DreamWorks Animation to score How to Train Your Dragon, making it his sixth collaboration with the studio, following Antz, The Road to El Dorado, Chicken Run, Shrek, and Kung Fu Panda (all of which he scored with either Harry Gregson-Williams and/or Hans Zimmer). Powell composed an orchestral score, combining bombastic brass with loud percussion and soothing strings, while also using exotic Scottish and Irish tones with instruments like the penny whistle and bagpipes. Additionally, Icelandic singer Jónsi wrote and performed the song "Sticks & Stones" for the film. The score was released by Varèse Sarabande on March 23, 2010.

The score was exceptionally well-received by critics, who garnered it with universal acclaim. Powell earned his first Academy Award nomination for his work on the film, ultimately losing to Trent Reznor and Atticus Ross for their score for The Social Network.

== Release ==
=== Theatrical ===
How to Train Your Dragon had its United States premiere on March 21, 2010, at the Gibson Amphitheatre in Universal City, California, and was theatrically released on March 26, 2010, in the United States. It was originally scheduled to be released on November 20, 2009, but was pushed back to avoid competition with Planet 51 and other family films released in November. The film was digitally re-mastered into IMAX 3D, and released to 186 North American IMAX theaters, and approximately 80 IMAX theaters outside North America.

A month before the release, DreamWorks Animation CEO Jeffrey Katzenberg protested Warner Bros.' decision to convert Clash of the Titans from 2D to 3D, then to release it one week after How to Train Your Dragon. Entertainment reporter Kim Masters described the 3D release schedule around March 2010 as a "traffic jam", and speculated that the lack of 3D screen availability could hurt Katzenberg's prospects despite his support of the 3D format. That month, theater industry executives accused Paramount Pictures (who distributed the film on behalf of DreamWorks) of using high-pressure tactics to coerce theaters to screen How to Train Your Dragon rather than competing 3D releases, Clash of the Titans and Tim Burton's Alice in Wonderland. As theater multiplexes often had just one 3D screen, theaters were unable to accommodate more than one 3D presentation at a time.

=== Home media ===
How to Train Your Dragon was released on single-disc DVD, two-disc double DVD pack, and Blu-ray/DVD combo pack editions in Canada and the United States on October 15, 2010. Among the features available in the two-disc DVD edition and Blu-ray is an original sequel short film, Legend of the Boneknapper Dragon. As of February 2012, 9.7 million home entertainment units were sold worldwide. The film was reissued on Blu-ray on May 27, 2014, with the short film Book of Dragons and an episode of DreamWorks Dragons added as additional bonus features.

In July 2014, the film's distribution rights were purchased by DreamWorks Animation from Paramount Pictures and transferred to 20th Century Fox before reverting to Universal Studios in 2018. As a result, Universal Pictures Home Entertainment released a 4K Ultra HD Blu-ray version of the film on January 22, 2019, alongside the film's sequel How to Train Your Dragon 2, making them the first DreamWorks Animation catalog titles to be released on that format, and in preparation for the release of How to Train Your Dragon: The Hidden World the following month.

== Reception ==
=== Box office ===
How to Train Your Dragon topped the North American box office with $43.7 million in its first weekend of release. The film grossed $217.6 million in the United States and Canada and $277.3 million in foreign countries with a worldwide total of $494.9 million. How to Train Your Dragon is DreamWorks Animation's highest-grossing film in the American and Canadian box office other than the Shrek films. It is the fifth-highest-grossing animated film of 2010, behind Toy Story 3 with $1,063.2 million, Shrek Forever After with $752.6 million, Tangled with $576.6 million, and Despicable Me with $543.1 million and the 10th-highest-grossing movie of 2010. As of 2019, the How to Train Your Dragon series has grossed over $1 billion worldwide.

=== Critical response ===
How to Train Your Dragon received critical acclaim upon its release. The film was widely praised for its animation, screenplay, voice performances, score, cinematography, and 3D sequences. Review aggregator Rotten Tomatoes reports that 99% of critics gave the film a positive review, based on 208 reviews from professional critics, with an overall rating average of 8.0/10. The website's critical consensus states, "Boasting dazzling animation, a script with surprising dramatic depth, and thrilling 3-D sequences, How to Train Your Dragon soars." As of September 2025, it is DreamWorks Animation's highest-rated film on the Rotten Tomatoes website. On Metacritic, the film has a weighted average score of 75 out of 100 based on 37 reviews from critics, indicating "generally favorable" reviews. Audiences polled by CinemaScore gave the film an average grade of "A" on an A+ to F scale.

Matt Risley of Variety wrote a highly positive review, hailing it as "undoubtedly Dreamworks' best film yet, and quite probably the best dragon movie ever made". James Berardinelli of ReelViews gave it 3.5 out of 4 stars, and complimented both the "technically proficient" animation and the "witty, intelligent, surprisingly insightful script". Claudia Puig of USA Today noted that the film had "surprising depth", and praised the "sweetly poignant tale of friendship between man and animal". Entertainment Weekly film critic Owen Gleiberman praised the film's usage of 3-D in all "its breathtaking spatial and emotional possibilities"; he gave a rating of A−. Richard Corliss of Time Magazine stated that "it's a foolproof scheme for picture making: take the plot elements of favorite movies, paint the concoction with bright colors so it looks like the zazziest customized car, set it running at NASCAR speed, and you have How to Train Your Dragon."

Both Roger Ebert of The Chicago Sun-Times and A. O. Scott of At The Movies felt that character and story development had been sidelined in favor of the visual spectacle. Ebert criticized the lengthy "aerial battles between tamed dragons and evil ones", but did note that "[the film] is bright, good-looking, and has high energy". Similarly, Scott commended the cinematography, observing that the "swooping and soaring [was] worth the price of a ticket." Rolling Stone film critic Peter Travers, giving it three out of four stars, wrote that the film "works enough miracles of 3-D animation to charm your socks off."

Roger Moore of The Orlando Sentinel, who gave the film 2½ stars out of 4, felt that the film's inclusion of more dramatic subject matter, instead of more comedic themes, was to the detriment of the film, making it a "waste of a funny book, some very funny actors and some darned witty animation." Village Voice film critic Ella Taylor also gave a more negative review of the film, describing it as an "adequate but unremarkable animated tale".

=== Accolades ===
At the 83rd Academy Awards, How to Train Your Dragon received nominations for Best Animated Feature and Best Original Score. The film's other nominations include fourteen Annie Awards (winning ten), two British Academy Film Awards, a Critics' Choice Movie Awards, and a Golden Globe Award.

== Sequels and franchise ==
The film was followed by two sequels, How to Train Your Dragon 2 (2014), and How to Train Your Dragon: The Hidden World (2019). Five post-movie short films were released: Legend of the Boneknapper Dragon (2010), Book of Dragons (2011), Gift of the Night Fury (2011), Dawn of the Dragon Racers (2014), and How to Train Your Dragon: Homecoming (2019). A live-action remake was released in 2025, to be followed by a remake of the second film in 2027.

A television series based on the film premiered on Cartoon Network in Autumn 2012. Jay Baruchel, America Ferrera, Christopher Mintz-Plasse, and T. J. Miller reprise their respective roles as Hiccup, Astrid, Fishlegs, and Tuffnut. The series, set between the first and second films, follows Hiccup and his friends as they learn more about dragons, discover new ones, teach others to feel comfortable around them, adapt traditions within the village to fit their new friends and battle against enemies as they explore new worlds.

HarperCollins Children's Books published a storybook version of the film in 2010. The story was adapted by Rennie Brown while the illustrations were painted by Michael Koelsch.

== Other media and live performances ==
An action adventure video game released by Activision, called How to Train Your Dragon, was released for the Wii, Xbox 360, PS3, and Nintendo DS gaming consoles. It is loosely based on the film and was released on March 23, 2010. In addition, School of Dragons, a 3D free-to-play MMO, was released on July 17, 2013, at San Diego Comic-Con. The game is available for PC, Android, and iOS.

How to Train Your Dragon Arena Spectacular is an arena show adaptation of the first film featuring 24 animatronic dragons, acrobats and projections. It premiered on March 2, 2012, in Melbourne, Australia.

A live-action remake of the film was announced to be in development in February 2023. It was produced by Marc Platt Productions and distributed by Universal Pictures, with DeBlois returning to write and direct. It was originally scheduled for release on March 14, 2025, but was delayed to June 13 of that year due to the 2023 SAG-AFTRA strike. Mason Thames and Nico Parker were cast as Hiccup and Astrid, respectively, with Butler reprising his role as Stoick.

In January 2024, it was announced that How to Train Your Dragon: Isle of Berk would be one of the five lands of Universal Orlando's third theme park Universal Epic Universe, which opened on May 22, 2025. The land features five attractions, including a launch roller coaster called Hiccup's Wing Gliders; a sky-fly ride called Dragon Racer's Rally; an interactive boat ride called Fyre Drill; and a children's play area called the Viking Training Camp. The fifth attraction is a twenty-minute stage show adaptation of an existing show featured in Universal Beijing that opened in 2021. The multimedia stage show puts guests right in the middle of a brand-new Viking adventure as Hiccup, Toothless, and Astrid encounter a challenge they must face together if they want the peace between Dragons and Vikings on Berk to persist. Guests can also have a meet-and-greet with Toothless and Hiccup, as well as other various characters and dragons from the films.
