= Rebecca de Pont Davies =

British opera singer

Rebecca de Pont Davies is a British mezzo-soprano who has performed with English National Opera and Welsh National Opera, and at the Teatro Real in Madrid and the Royal Opera House in Covent Garden, among others.

Davies was born and educated in Blackheath, and is the sister of the screenwriter William Davies and the television producer Michael Davies. She has been diagnosed with Graves' disease. Davies went straight from school to the Guildhall School of Music and Drama where she completed the four year Associate of the Guildhall School of Music (AGSM) course and the two year Opera Course for which she was awarded a full scholarship before becoming a Company Artist for English National Opera. Here her roles included Ottavia in The Coronation of Poppea, Ulrica in A Masked Ball, Mistress Quickly in Falstaff, Annina in Der Rosenkavalier, Theatre Dresser/Schoolboy/Groom/Girl’s Mother in Lulu, Mrs Sedley and Auntie in Peter Grimes, Bronka in The Passenger, Marya in War and Peace and Ruth in the Mike Leigh production of The Pirates of Penzance.

Davies’s roles in other productions include Marchioness in La fille du régiment for Teatro Real in Madrid, Auntie in Peter Grimes for Deutsche Oper Berlin, Prakriti's mother in the premiere of Wagner Dream for Dutch National Opera and later for Welsh National Opera; Second Maid in Elektra for Dutch National Opera; Witch in Hänsel und Gretel; Herodias in Salome in Bielefeld; Mrs Sedley in Peter Grimes for Deutsche Oper am Rhein and the Liceu in Barcelona; Geneviève in Pelléas et Mélisande in Essen; Jack’s Mother in Into the Woods; Beroe in The Bassarids, Old Lady in Sunday in the Park with George, and Beggar Woman in Sweeney Todd: The Demon Barber of Fleet Street for Théâtre du Châtelet; Mrs Sedley in Peter Grimes, Maddalena in Rigoletto and Klytämnestra in Elektra for Opera North; French Mother in Death in Venice for the Glyndebourne Festival Opera (filmed by the BBC); Katisha in The Mikado in a co-production between Scottish Opera and the D'Oyly Carte Opera Company at the Theatre Royal, Glasgow; Kabanicha in Káťa Kabanová for Teatro Regio in Turin and Auntie in Peter Grimes for Teatro Nacional de São Carlos in Lisbon.

Davies made her Royal Opera House début as Old Sister 2 in John Browne's Babette's Feast in the Linbury Studio Theatre, and for them has also sung Schwertleite in Die Walküre, Second Esquire in Parsifal, Aunt Kaye in the world premiere of Anna Nicole and Hostess of the Inn in Boris Godunov.

Davies’s performances in concert include Judith Weir’s The Consolations of Scholarship with the Lontano Ensemble, Manuel de Falla’s El amor brujo and Siete canciones populares españolas with the Symphony Nova Scotia and performances with the BBC Proms, London Sinfonietta, the BBC Symphony Orchestra and the Philharmonia Orchestra. Her recordings include Falstaff with English National Opera and String, Paper, Wood by Ronald Corp.

Davies is married to the singer and writer Jessica Walker.
