= Anna Nicole =

2011 opera by Mark-Anthony Turnage

- Opera by Mark-Anthony Turnage
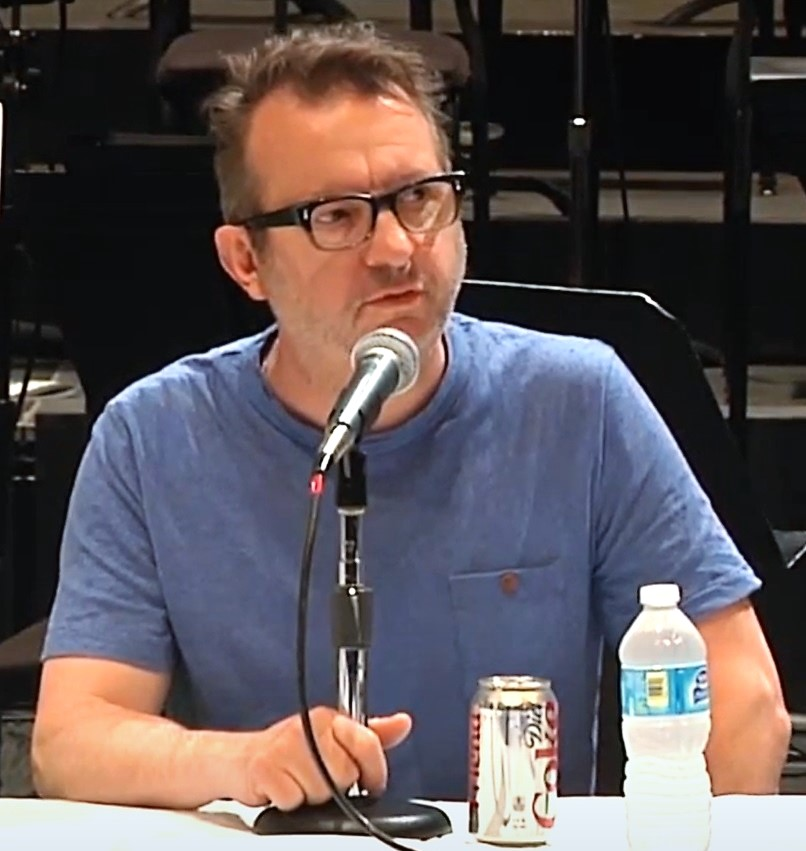
- Turnage in 2014
- Librettist: Richard Thomas
- Based on: Life of Anna Nicole Smith
- Premiere: 17 February 2011; Royal Opera House, London

Anna Nicole is an opera in 2 acts and 16 scenes, with music by Mark-Anthony Turnage to an English libretto by Richard Thomas. Based on the life of American model Anna Nicole Smith, the opera received its première on 17 February 2011 at the Royal Opera House, Covent Garden, London, directed by Richard Jones. A recording of the opera was broadcast on BBC Four and BBC iPlayer on 25 March 2011. The broadcast drew in 67,700 viewers. The opera received its first London revival at Covent Garden in September 2014.

== Premiere ==
The opera received its European continental premiere at Theater Dortmund (Germany) in April 2013 with American soprano Emily Newton in the title role. Anna Nicole received its U.S. premiere on September 17, 2013, in a production by the New York City Opera at the Brooklyn Academy of Music, the last work staged by the City Opera before its closure that year. It starred Sarah Joy Miller as Anna and Robert Brubaker as J. Howard Marshall II.

== Roles ==
Role	Voice type	Premiere cast, 17 February 2011 Conductor: Antonio Pappano
Anna Nicole	soprano	Eva-Maria Westbroek
Virgie, her mother	mezzo-soprano	Susan Bickley
Daddy Hogan, her father	bass	Jeremy White
Billy, her first husband	baritone	Grant Doyle
J. Howard Marshall, her second husband	tenor	Alan Oke
Kay, her aunt	mezzo-soprano	Rebecca de Pont Davies
Shelley, her cousin	mezzo-soprano	Loré Lixenberg
Stern, her lawyer	bass-baritone	Gerald Finley
Young Daniel, her son	silent	Andrew Gilbert
Teenage Daniel	baritone	Dominic Rowntree
Larry King, a television journalist	tenor	Peter Hoare
Blossom	mezzo-soprano	Allison Cook
Doctor Yes	tenor	Andrew Rees
Mayor of Mexia	tenor	Wynne Evans
Deputy Mayor of Mexia (Roy Fiction)	baritone	Damian Thantrey
Trucker	tenor	Jeffrey Lloyd-Roberts
Dominic Gent	tenor	Dominic Peckham
Patron	baritone	Grant Doyle
Runner	baritone	ZhengZhong Zhou
Meat Rack Quartet	soprano soprano mezzo-soprano mezzo-soprano	Marianne Cotterill; Kiera Lyness; Louise Armit; Andrea Hazell
Marshall's family	mezzo-soprano mezzo-soprano baritone bass	Loré Lixenberg; Rebecca de Pont Davies; Grant Doyle; Jeremy White
Four Lap Dancers	soprano soprano mezzo-soprano mezzo-soprano	Yvonne Barclay; Katy Batho; Amy Catt; Amanda Floyd
Onstage Band		John Parricelli (guitarist); John Paul Jones (bass guitarist); Peter Erskine (drummer)

== Synopsis ==
=== Act 1 ===
- 'Scene Zero' – Overture
- Scene 1 – 'America Sings'
- Scene 2 – "No! It's Mu-Hay-Uh."
- Scene 3 – "Hey We're Family"
- Scene 4 – 'Falling in Loath Again'
- Scene 5 – 'Life Implants'
- Scene 6 – 'American Dreaming'
- Scene 7 – 'Marriage in the White Dove Chapel'

=== Act 2 ===
- Scene 8 – 'Red Carpet Diem'
- Scene 9 – 'Partay!'
- Scene 10 – "Not Dead Yet!"
- Scene 11 – 'Backstage at the Larry King Show'
- Scene 12 – 'The Larry King Show and Tell'
- Scene 13 – "Good Morning Hollywood"
- Scene 14 – 'Birth Worth'
- Scene 15 – 'Daniel Death'
- Scene 16 – 'Clown Messiah'
