= Jeremy White (bass) =

English singer

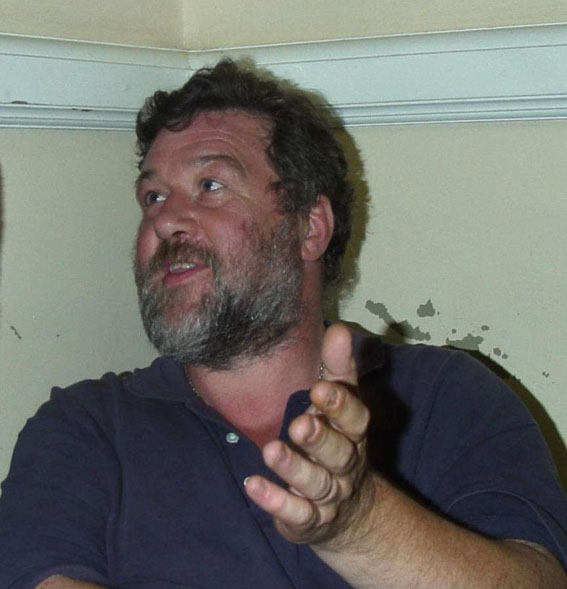
Photo of Jeremy White

Jeremy White is an English bass, with an international career in opera, concerts and recording. He is noted for the wide range of his repertoire, which ranges from early to contemporary music.

White was born in Liverpool, and studied at Queen's College, Oxford. He has worked as a professional musician since graduation, spending many years as a member of the BBC Singers. He debuted at the Royal Opera House, Covent Garden in 1991 and has sung at each subsequent season. Jeremy was one of the soloists who performed at the Gala Evening which inaugurated the newly re-opened house.

Off-stage, he is an instrumentalist and arranger of musical pieces, and is the Chair of the Trustees that run Spode Music Week.

== Sources ==
- Richard Morrison, Review: Billy Budd at Glyndebourne, The Times, 21 May 2010
- Simon Thomas, Review: La Serva Padrona, Royal Opera, Linbury Studio, Music OMH, November 2006
- Laura Kate Wilson, Review: Opera North's 'Fidelio'- A Focus on Freedom, April 2011
