= William Davies (screenwriter) =

English screenwriter and producer (born 1960)

- Born: 1960 (age 65–66); England
- Other names: William Davis; Will Davies
- Education: Mercersburg Academy; University of Cambridge
- Occupations: Screenwriter, film producer
- Relatives: Michael Davies (brother); Rebecca de Pont Davies (sister)

William Davies (born 1960), sometimes credited William Davis or Will Davies, is an English screenwriter and producer. He has written and co-written a number of films including Twins (1988), The Real McCoy (1993), the Johnny English franchise (2003–2018), Alien Autopsy (2006), Flushed Away (2006), How to Train Your Dragon (2010), Puss in Boots (2011), and Lyle, Lyle, Crocodile (2022).

The British-born Davies is a graduate of Mercersburg Academy and Cambridge University. He is the brother of television producer Michael Davies and the opera singer Rebecca de Pont Davies.

== Filmography ==
=== Film ===
| Year | Title | Writer | Producer | Director |
|---|---|---|---|---|
| 1988 | Twins | Yes | No | Ivan Reitman |
| 1992 | Stop! Or My Mom Will Shoot | Yes | No | Roger Spottiswoode |
| 1993 | The Real McCoy | Yes | Executive | Russell Mulcahy |
| 1993 | Ghost in the Machine | Yes | Co-producer | Rachel Talalay |
| 1995 | Dr. Jekyll and Ms. Hyde | Yes | No | David Price |
| 2000 | The Guilty | Yes | Executive | Anthony Waller |
| 2002 | Ignition | Yes | No | Yves Simoneau |
| 2003 | Johnny English | Yes | No | Peter Howitt |
| 2006 | Alien Autopsy | Yes | Yes | Jonny Campbell |
| 2006 | Flushed Away | Yes | No | David Bowers; Sam Fell |
| 2010 | How to Train Your Dragon | Yes | No | Chris Sanders; Dean DeBlois |
| 2011 | Johnny English Reborn | Story | Executive | Oliver Parker |
| 2011 | Puss in Boots | Story | No | Chris Miller |
| 2018 | Johnny English Strikes Again | Yes | Executive | David Kerr |
| 2022 | Lyle, Lyle, Crocodile | Yes | No | Will Speck; Josh Gordon |

=== Television ===
| Year | Title | Writer | Producer | Notes |
|---|---|---|---|---|
| 1987 | Student Exchange | Yes | No | TV movie |
| 1994 | Bermuda Grace | Yes | Yes | TV movie |
| 1998 | Ghost Cop | Yes | No | 1 episode |
| 2001 | Red Cap | No | Yes | TV movie |
| 2004 | Red Cap | No | Yes | 2 episodes |
| 2020 | The Letter for the King | Yes | Executive | |
| 2022 | Man vs. Bee | Yes | Yes | 9-episode series |
| 2025 | Man vs. Baby | Co-writer | Executive co-producer | 4-episode series |
