= Darren T. Holmes =

American film editor

- Occupation: Film editor

Darren T. Holmes is a film editor whose credits include animated films such as The Iron Giant (1999), Lilo & Stitch (2002), Ratatouille (2007), How to Train Your Dragon (2010), and The Croods (2013) as well as My Father’s Dragon (2022). He also served as a consulting editor for Song of the Sea (2014).

Holmes has been elected to membership in the American Cinema Editors.

Holmes is also a member of the Academy of Motion Picture Arts and Sciences.

== Filmography ==
- The Iron Giant (1999) - editor
- Lilo & Stitch (2002) - editor (edited by)
- Ratatouille (2007) - editor (as Darren Holmes)
- How to Train Your Dragon (2010) - editor (as Darren Holmes)
- The Croods (2013) - editor (as Darren Holmes)
- Song of the Sea (2014) - Consulting editor
- Wolfwalkers (2020) - editor (as Darren Holmes) with Richie Cody and Darragh Byrne
- My Father's Dragon (2022) - editor (as Darren Holmes) with Richie Cody
- Puss in Boots: The Last Wish (2022) - Pre-production editor
- Ray Gunn - (2026) - editor
