= India Fowler =

British actress (born 2003)

- Born: 20 December 2003 (age 22); Watford, England
- Occupation: Actress
- Years active: 2016–present

India Fowler (born 20 December 2003) is an English actress. On television, she is known for her roles in the Showtime thriller The Agency (2024) and the Netflix series White Lines (2020). Her films include Fear Street: Prom Queen (2025).

== Career ==
Fowler began her acting career with a role in the film Retaliation in 2017. In 2018, Fowler gained recognition for portraying Ellen Mason in Netflix television mini-series Safe. She also portrayed Princess Christina of San Senova in the Christmas film Christmas at the Palace.

In 2020, she appeared as Young Zoe Walker in the Netflix series White Lines. Prior to her film and TV appearances she played the role of the child in the acclaimed stage version of George Orwell's 1984 at the Playhouse Theatre in London's West End.

She continued her television career with her role as Maddy in 2022 in Man vs. Bee alongside Rowan Atkinson. In 2023, Fowler played the character Lillie Massen in the HBO series The Nevers. As well as this, she played the role of Sara in Sky Max's television film The Amazing Mr. Blunden. In 2024, Fowler had prominent roles in Paramount+ series Insomnia playing the role of Chloe Averill., as well as playing the role of Poppy in Showtime thriller The Agency. Fowler stars as the lead in Netflix slasher film Fear Street: Prom Queen in 2025.

In April 2026, Fowler was cast as Grace Ivers for season two of the Off Campus series, based on the novel The Mistake by Elle Kennedy.

== Filmography ==
=== Film ===
Year	Title	Role	Notes
2017	Retaliation	Sophie	
2021	Know the Grass	Mattie	Short film
2024	The Strangers: Chapter 1	Waitress	
2025	Fear Street: Prom Queen	Lori Granger	Main role

=== Television ===
Year	Title	Role	Notes
2018	Safe	Ellen Mason	Main role; mini-series; episodes 1–8
2018	Christmas at The Palace	Princess Christina	Television film
2020	White Lines	Young Zoe Walker	Episodes 1–5
2021	The Amazing Mr. Blunden	Sara	Television film
2022	Man vs. Bee	Maddy	Recurring role; episodes 1, 2, 6 & 9
2023	The Nevers	Lillie Massen	Recurring role; episodes 8–12
2024	Franklin	Angelic Young Girl	Mini-series; episode 3: "Pride and Gout"
2024	Insomnia	Chloe Averill	Main role; episodes 1–6
2024–present	The Agency	Poppy Cunningham	Main role
2025	The Trial	Teah Sinclair	Television film
2027	Off Campus	Grace Ivers	Main role (season 2)
