= Alexander Rybak discography =

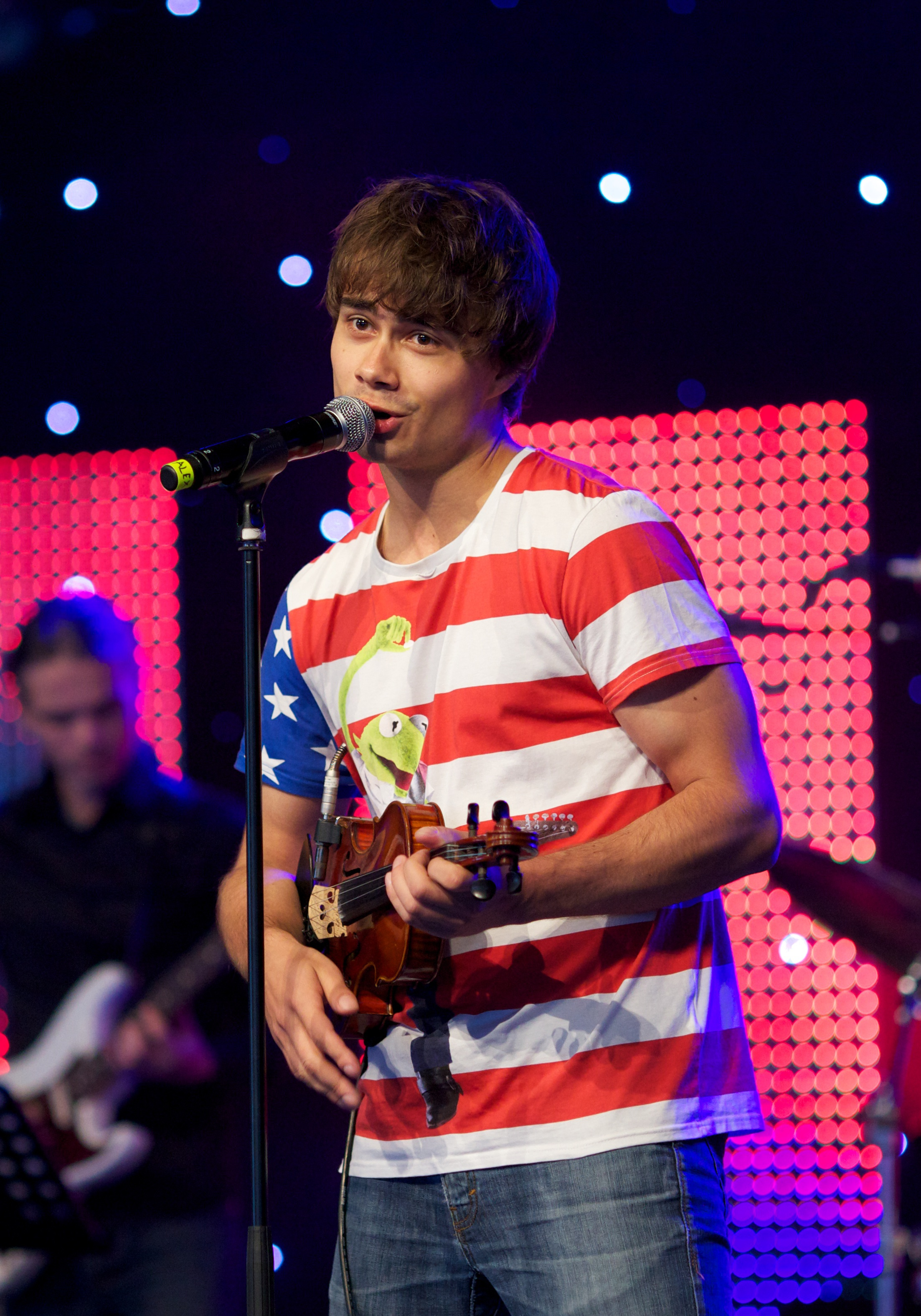
- Rybak performing in 2011.
- Studio albums: 5
- Singles: 23
- Music videos: 24

This is the discography of Belarusian-Norwegian singer-songwriter Alexander Rybak. He represented Norway at the Eurovision Song Contest 2009 in Moscow, Russia, and eventually went on to win the contest with 387 points—the highest tally any country achieved (under the 1975–2015 points system) in the history of Eurovision—with "Fairytale". He also represented Norway again at the Eurovision Song Contest 2018 with "That's How You Write A Song", winning the second semi-final with 266 points - making him the only double semi-final winner since the introduction of semifinals in 2004 (he also won the second semi-final in 2009 with 201 points), and landing in 15th place in the final with 144 points.

== Albums ==
=== Studio albums ===
Album Title	Album details	Peak chart positions										Certifications
Album Title	Album details	NOR	AUT	BEL	DEN	FIN	FRA	GER	NL	SWE	SWI	Certifications
Fairytales	Released: 29 May 2009; Format: Digital download, CD; Labels: EMI, Universal	1	46	13	15	4	21	16	29	2	65	GLF: Gold
No Boundaries	Released: 14 June 2010; Format: Digital download, CD; Label: Universal	7	—	—	—	32	—	—	—	8	—	
Visa vid vindens ängar	Released: 15 June 2011; Format: Digital download, CD; Label: Alexander Rybak AS	7	—	—	—	—	—	—	—	40	—	
Christmas Tales	Released: 23 November 2012; Format: Digital download, CD; Label: Grappa Musikkforlag AS	34	—	—	—	—	—	—	—	—	—	
Trolle og den magiske fela	Released: 2 December 2015; Format: Digital download, CD; Label: Self-released	—	—	—	—	—	—	—	—	—	—	
Fairytales Too	Released: 19 January 2026	—	—	—	—	—	—	—	—	—	—	
"—" denotes album that did not chart or was not released.

== Singles ==
=== As lead artist ===
Title	Year	Peak chart positions										Certifications	Album
Title	Year	NOR	AUT	BEL	DEN	FIN	GER	NL	SWE	SWI	UK	Certifications	Album
"Fairytale"	2009	1	10	1	1	1	4	2	1	3	10	GLF: Platinum; IFPI FIN: Gold; BPI: Silver	Fairytales
"Funny Little World"	2009	1	—	—	—	—	—	—	4	—	—		Fairytales
"Roll with the Wind"	2009	10	—	—	—	—	—	—	—	—	—		Fairytales
"Oah"	2010	—	—	—	—	—	—	—	—	—	—		No Boundaries
"Visa vid vindens ängar"	2011	—	—	—	—	—	—	—	—	—	—		Visa vid vindens ängar
"Resan till dig"	2011	—	—	—	—	—	—	—	—	—	—		Visa vid vindens ängar
"I’ll Show You" (with Paula Seling)	2012	—	—	—	—	—	—	—	—	—	—		Non-album singles
"Leave Me Alone"	2012	—	—	— (Note: "Leave Me Alone" did not chart on the Flemish Ultratop 50, but peaked at number 80 on the Ultratip chart, the top 100 songs which have not made the Ultratop 50.)	—	—	—	—	—	—	—		Non-album singles
"Into a Fantasy"	2014	—	—	—	—	—	—	—	—	—	—		How to Train Your Dragon 2 Soundtrack
"I Came to Love You"	2016	—	—	—	—	—	—	—	—	—	—		Non-album singles
"That's How You Write a Song"	2018	28	—	— (Note: "That's How You Write a Song" did not chart on the Flemish Ultratop 50, but peaked at number 29 on the Ultratip chart, the top 100 songs which have not made the Ultratop 50.)	—	—	—	—	58	—	— (Note: "That's How You Write a Song" did not enter the UK Singles Chart, but peaked at number 100 on the UK Downloads component chart.)	IFPI Norway: Platinum	Non-album singles
"Mom"	2018	—	—	—	—	—	—	—	—	—	—		Non-album singles
"Let the Music Guide You"	2018	—	—	—	—	—	—	—	—	—	—		Non-album singles
"I'm Still Here"	2019	—	—	—	—	—	—	—	—	—	—		Non-album singles
"My Whole World"	2020	—	—	—	—	—	—	—	—	—	—		Non-album singles
"Give Me Rain"	2020	—	—	—	—	—	—	—	—	—	—		Non-album singles
"Magic"	2020	—	—	—	—	—	—	—	—	—	—		Non-album singles
"Wonderland" (with Roxen)	2020	—	—	—	—	—	—	—	—	—	—		Non-album singles
"Mitt Andre Hjem"	2021	—	—	—	—	—	—	—	—	—	—		Non-album singles
"Stay" (with Sirusho)	2021	—	—	—	—	—	—	—	—	—	—		Non-album singles
"Hold Me"	2021	—	—	—	—	—	—	—	—	—	—		Non-album singles
"Memories"	2022	—	—	—	—	—	—	—	—	—	—		Non-album singles
"No More Me and You" (with Annsofi)	2023	—	—	—	—	—	—	—	—	—	—		Non-album singles
"1000 Views" (featuring Grace Kelly)	2023	—	—	—	—	—	—	—	—	—	—		Non-album singles
"Kid"	2023	—	—	—	—	—	—	—	—	—	—		Non-album singles
"Maybe"	2024	—	—	—	—	—	—	—	—	—	—		
"Fairytale" (with Ballinciaga)	2025	49	—	—	—	—	—	—	—	—	—		
"—" denotes single that did not chart or was not released.

=== As featured artist ===
Title	Year	Peak chart positions	Album
Title	Year	NOR	Album
"Typisk norsk" (Katastrofe featuring Alexander Rybak)	2015	12	Non-album singles
"Devil in Red" (Marian Aas Hansen featuring Alexander Rybak)	2016	—	Non-album singles
"Mu bákti - Min Klippe" (Christian Ingebrigtsen featuring Alexander Rybak)	2018	—	Non-album singles
"XTV - Зафиналили" (XTV featuring Alexander Rybak)			Non-album singles
"—" denotes single that did not chart or was not released.

=== Promotional singles ===
Title	Year	Album
"Europe's Skies"	2010	No Boundaries
"What I Long For"	2014	Non-album singles
"Kotik"	2015	Non-album singles
"Blant fjell"	2015	Trolle og den magiske fela
"Люблю тебя как раньше"	2016	Non-album singles
"5 to 7 Years"	2016	Non-album singles
"Return"	2016	Non-album singles
"Foolin'"	2016	Non-album singles
"Fever"	2017	Non-album singles
"Til Julie"	2017	Non-album singles

== Other songs ==
Title	Year	Chart positions	Album
Title	Year	RUS	Album
"I Don't Believe in Miracles / Superhero"	2009	18	Black Lightning Soundtrack
"Fela Igjen" (featuring Opptur)	2010	—	Non-album songs
"Atlantis"	2011	—	Non-album songs
"Belarusian: Небасхіл Еўропы"	2011	—	Budzma! Tuzin. Perazagruzka-2
"—" denotes single that did not chart or was not released.

== Guest appearances ==
Title	Year	Artist	Ref.
"Fairytale"	2017	Franziska Wiese	
"Kotik"	2017	Franziska Wiese	

== Music videos ==
Title	Year	Director	Ref.
"Foolin"	2006		
"Fairytale"	2009	Video Workshop AS	
"Roll With The Wind"	2009	Bård Røssevold	
"Funny Little World"	2009	Ligistfilm	
"Ya Ne Veryu v Chudesa"	2009		
"Fela Igjen" (feat. Opptur)	2010	Tommel Opp Film	
"Oah"	2010	Lars Kristian Flemmen	
"Europe's Skies"	2010	Alexander Filatovich	
"Небеса Европы" (Russian version of "Europe's Skies")	2010	Alexander Filatovich	
"Небасхіл Еўропы" (Belarusian version of "Europe's Skies")	2011	Alexander Filatovich	
"Стрела Амура" (Strela Amura - Russian version of "Oah")	2012	Alexander Filatovich	
"Leave Me Alone"	2012	Alexander Filatovich	
"Dostala" (Russian version of "Leave Me Alone")	2012	Alexander Filatovich	
"5 to 7 Years"	2013	Joakim Kleven	
"Bade To" (Featuring Persian Artist Arad Aria )	2018	Moein Mousazade	
"I'm Still Here"	2019	Marius Bjellebø	
"My Whole World"	2020	Marius Bjellebø	
"Give Me Rain"	2020	Marius Bjellebø	
"Позади"	2020	Marius Bjellebø	
"Magic"	2020	Alexander Rybak and Marius Bjellebø	
"Beethoven Jazz" (Featuring Felix Peikli)	2021	Cathrine Aase Walberg	
"Hold Me"	2021	Alan Yammin	
"Memories"	2022	Ralph Klisiewicz	
"No More Me and You"	2023	Victor Christoffer Sandmark	
