= Roll with the Wind =

Single by Alexander Rybak

from the album Fairytales
- Released: 2 June 2009
- Genre: Pop, folk
- Length: 3:34
- Label: EMI
- Songwriter(s): Mårten Eriksson, Lina Eriksson
- Producer(s): Amir Aly

Alexander Rybak singles chronology
"Funny Little World" (2009)	"Roll with the Wind" (2009)	"Oah" (2010)

Music video
- "Roll With the Wind" on YouTube

"Roll with the Wind" is a song by Norwegian singer–songwriter Alexander Rybak from his debut studio album, Fairytales. "Roll with the Wind" was written by Mårten Eriksson and Lisa Eriksson and produced by Amir Aly.

== Music video ==
A music video for "Roll with the Wind" was filmed on the island of Giske in Norway, in July 2009. It was released on 15 September 2009.

== Charts ==
"Roll with the Wind" entered the Norwegian charts on 2 June 2009 at 16#. At the same time, Rybak had two other singles in the top 3, "Funny Little World" and "Fairytale". The next week it climbed to No. 10. The single dropped out of the Top 20 in its 3rd week.

Chart (2009)	Peak position
Norway (VG-lista)	10

== Release history ==
Region	Date	Format
Norway	2 June 2009	Radio, digital download
Germany	23 October 2009	CD single

== Other versions ==
A version of the song, sung in Swedish and with the title "Vända med vinden", was featured on the 2010 debut album Längtan by Swedish group Timoteij. This version features Alexander Rybak on violin.

== German CD single track list ==
1. Roll with the wind
2. No Milk Today (Herman's Hermits Cover)
