= Resan till dig =

Single by Alexander Rybak

from the album Visa vid vindens ängar
- Released: 8 June 2011
- Genre: Pop
- Length: 4:01
- Label: Alexander Rybak AS
- Songwriter(s): Alexander Rybak (music), Mats Paulson (lyrics)

Alexander Rybak singles chronology
"Oah" (2010)	"Resan till dig" (2011)	"I'll Show You" (2012)

"Resan till dig" ("The journey to you") is the first Swedish-language single by Belarusian-Norwegian artist Alexander Rybak in collaboration with Swedish poet and artist Mats Paulson. The song was released as the lead and only single from his third studio album Visa vid vindens ängar (2011). It was released in Norway on 8 June 2011 as a digital download on iTunes.

== Critical reception ==
"Resan till dig" was one of Rybak's most appreciated single by music critics since "Fairytale". Eurovisionary called it the most commercial single from his album Visa vid videns änger.

== Live performances ==
On 10 June 2011 Alexander performed the live on Norwegian TV show God Morgen Norge. On 30 June 2011 he performed the song live on Norwegian entertainment TV show Allsang på Grensen.

In Sweden, he performed the song at Lotta på Liseberg on 20 June 2011.

== Track listing ==
Digital download
No.	Title	Writer(s)	Length
1.	"Resan till dig"	Rybak; Paulson	4:01

== Release history ==
Region	Date	Format	Label
Norway	8 June 2011	Digital download	Alexander Rybak AS
