= Barfotavisan =

Song by Mats Paulson

from the album Barfota
- Language: Swedish
- Released: 1974
- Songwriter: Mats Paulson

Barfotavisan is a summertime song written by Mats Paulson, and recorded by him on the 1974 album Barfota. It also charted at Svensktoppen for six weeks between 15 December 1974-19 January 1975, peaking at eight position

Mats Paulson said the lyrics were inspired by the song "Blåsippor" (with the lines "Nu får vi gå utan strumpor och skor").
