= Visa vid vindens ängar (song) =

Song by Mats Paulson

from the album En stad, en morgon
- Language: Swedish
- Released: 1966
- Songwriter: Mats Paulson

"Visa vid vindens ängar" is a summer song written by Mats Paulson, who recorded it on his 1966 album En stad, en morgon. A Lars Lönndahl recording charted at Svensktoppen for one week, on 22 May 1977.

== Covers ==
The song been recorded by Mats Rådberg in 1988, and by Håkan Hellström on the 2002 EP Luften bor i mina steg, a version which charted at Trackslistan.

The Belarusian-Norwegian artist Alexander Rybak also recorded it for his similarly titled album Visa vid vindens ängar, his third released on 15 June 2011 in Norway.

Linda Pira covered it and her version has charted in the Sverigetopplistan Swedish singles chart in February 2015.
