= Längtan (Timoteij album) =

Studio album by Timoteij
- Released: 28 April 2010
- Recorded: 2009–2010
- Genre: Pop, Europop
- Length: 37:31
- Label: Universal Music/Lionheart International
- Producer: Eurén

Singles from Längtan
- 1. "Kom" Released: February 28, 2010

Längtan (English: Longing) is the debut album of Swedish Europop group Timoteij. The lead single, "Kom", written and produced by Niclas Arn, Karl Eurén and Gustav Eurén, peaked at the Swedish Top 60 Singles chart at number two. "Kom" finished in first place in the third semi-final of Melodifestivalen 2010 and fifth in the national final.

Upon the release of the album, it debuted at number one on the Swedish Albums Chart.

== Track listing ==
No.	Title	Length
1.	"Högt över ängarna"	3:56
2.	"Vild"	3:30
3.	"Feber"	3:05
4.	"Kom"	2:59
5.	"Glöm mig"	2:58
6.	"Dansar i månens sken"	3:41
7.	"Vända med vinden (feat. Alexander Rybak)"	3:33
8.	"Ingen idé"	3:57
9.	"Drömmarnas land"	2:51
10.	"Fånga dagen"	3:55
11.	"Längtan"	3:05

== Release history ==
Region	Date	Label	Format	Catalogue
Sweden	April 28, 2010	Lionheart International (Universal)	CD, digital download	UNI-LHICD -0108

== Charts and certifications ==
=== Weekly charts ===
Chart (2010)	Peak position
Swedish Albums (Sverigetopplistan)	1

=== Year-end charts ===
Chart (2010)	Position
Swedish Albums (Sverigetopplistan)	33

=== Certifications ===
Country	Certification
Sweden	GLF: Gold
