= Kom (Timoteij song) =

Single by Timoteij

from the album Längtan
- Released: February 28, 2010
- Recorded: 2009
- Genre: Europop, worldbeat
- Length: 3:00
- Label: Universal Music
- Songwriters: Niclas Arn, Karl Eurén, Gustav Eurén

Timoteij singles chronology
"Kom" (2010)	"Högt Över Ängarna" (2010)

"Kom" (English: Come) is a song by the Swedish Europop group Timoteij. It was recorded in 2009 and was written by Niclas Arn, Karl Eurén and Gustav Eurén as the leading single for the group's debut album Längtan.

Timoteij participated in the Swedish Melodifestivalen 2010 with "Kom" and finished first in the third semi-final in Gothenburg and therefore progressed to the finale in the Globe Arena in Stockholm. The song finished at fifth place with a total of 95 points. It was eventually chosen to represent Sweden at the OGAE Second Chance Contest and finished at first place.

== Track listing ==
Digital download

(Released: February 28, 2010) (Universal)

1. "Kom" [Radio Edit] — 3:00

CD-single

(Released: March, 2010) (Universal)

1. "Kom" [Radio Edit] — 3:00
2. "Kom" [Instrumental] — 3:00

Digital download

(Released: March 6, 2011) (Universal)

1. "Run" — 3:00

Digital download

(Released: December 18, 2023) (Renegade Recordings)

1. "Come" — 2:59
2. "Come" [Singback version] — 2:59
3. "Come" [Instrumental version] — 3:00

== Charts ==
=== Weekly charts ===
Chart (2010)	Peak position	Certification
Sweden (Sverigetopplistan)	2	GLF: Gold

=== Year-end charts ===
Chart (2010)	Position
Sweden (Sverigetopplistan)	17
