= No Boundaries (Alexander Rybak album) =

Studio album by Alexander Rybak
- Released: 24 June 2010
- Recorded: 2010 at Yla Studios in Malmö, Sweden
- Genre: Pop
- Length: 40:10
- Label: Universal

Alexander Rybak chronology
Fairytales (2009)	No Boundaries (2010)	Visa vid vindens ängar (2011)

Singles from No Boundaries
- 1. "Oah" Released: 14 May 2010; 2. "Europe's Skies" Released: 13 October 2010

No Boundaries is the second studio album by the Belarusian-Norwegian artist Alexander Rybak, released on 24 June 2010

== Background ==
It was recorded in Yla Studios in Malmö. The album include three songs dedicated to his workmates: "Oah", "Why Not Me" and "First Kiss". It also has a tribute to Finland, "Suomi". "5000 Letters" seemingly reflects the letters Rybak received from fans. Another spoken track, "Kaja's Letter" is a letter Rybak found special and was voice by a small Norwegian girl named Kaja.

Due to the album's crossover nature, Rybak was sure that the album would be slaughtered by music critics upon its release.

== Critical reception ==
The album was met with mixed reviews. A Slovak music critic gave the album overall a favourable review, but noted that the chaos that surrounded Rybak and his organisational management could hinder the album's performances. VG gave the album a "die throw" of 3, stating that although "it might be fun to showcase solid qualities in different genres, but it is not always fun to listen to.". Eurovisionary stated Rybak seemingly suffered from the commercial success of his previous album and this album was a "messy affair". A Dutch reviewer suggested that Rybak could have done better by spreading his music over multiple albums. Critics generally named "Dare I Say" and "Why Not Me" the best songs on the albums.

== Plagiarism accusations ==
RIA Novosti accused Alexander of plagiarizing Konstantin Meladze's music (which has already been used in Valery Meladze's song "Kak ty krasiva segodnya" on YouTube) and using it in his song "5000 Letters". Some other sources, as RIA Novosti says, have already revealed that the music was not written by Alexander Rybak himself and there was no act of plagiarism.

== Track listing ==
No.	Title	Writer(s)	Length
1.	"First Kiss"	Rybak; Wærnes	3:03
2.	"Europe's Skies"	Rybak; Wærnes	3:44
3.	"I'm in Love"	Carli	3:57
4.	"Oah"	Rybak; Eriksen; Dankel; Jenssen	4:19
5.	"Kaja's Letter"	Høveld	0:39
6.	"5000 Letters"	Meladze; Rybak	4:31
7.	"Dare I Say"	Rybak	4:31
8.	"Suomi (Finland)"	Rybak; Wærnes	3:58
9.	"Why Not Me?"	Rybak	3:50
10.	"Barndance"	Rybak	3:21
11.	"Disney Girls"	Johnston	4:14
Total length:			40:07

== Charts ==
No Boundaries entered the Norwegian albums chart at number 18, it climbed to number 11 the next week. It entered the Swedish Albums Chart on 25 June 2010 at number 8, the next week to dropped to number 47. It also entered the Finnish Albums Chart at number 32, it dropped to 48 the next week.

Chart (2010)	Peak position
Finnish Albums Chart	32
Norwegian Albums Chart	7
Swedish Albums Chart	8
Polish Albums Chart	12

== Legacy of "Europe's Skies" ==
"Europe's Skies" became the most successful track of the album after its release and is usually named alongside "Kotik" and "Fairytale" as Rybak's most successful songs. Although it never became an official single, Rybak performed "Europe's Skies" during the Junior Eurovision Song Contest 2010 and was scheduled to perform the song during the Eurovision Song Contest 2010 too.

Rybak shot a video for "Europe's Skies" in Crimea in late 2010. This video quickly became an internet hit, becoming Rybak's most watched official video until the release of "Kotik" in 2015. As of May 2025, the video holds more than 61 million views and is still Rybak's second-most watched music video.

In 2011 he re-sung the song “Europe's Skies” in the Belarusian language as “Небасхіл Еўропы” for the Budzma! Tuzin. Perazagruzka-2 compilation album.” In her review for the magazine “Большой,” music critic Taciana Zamiroŭskaja came to the conclusion that, unlike in Russian, Alexander Rybak sings in Belarusian quite naturally. Rybak and Filatovych returned to Crimea in 2012 to recreate the original video filmed in 2010, but with new shots featuring Rybak singing in Belarusian. The video has accustomed to over 4 million views.
