= Trolle og den magiske fela =

Studio album by Alexander Rybak
- Released: 2 November 2015
- Studio: Masterpool Studio, Gjerdrum
- Genre: Children's music
- Length: 45:22
- Label: Alexander Rybak AS
- Producer: Knut Bjørnar Asphol

Alexander Rybak chronology
Christmas Tales (2012)	Trolle og den magiske fela (2015)

Singles from Trolle og den magiske fela
- 1. "Blant Fjell" Released: 12 June 2015

Trolle og den magiske fela (Trolle and the magical violin) is the fifth studio album and the first Norwegian-language album by the Belarusian-Norwegian artist Alexander Rybak, released on 2 November 2015, alongside the eponymous children's book. An eponymous musical was staged in Kristiansand in 2019.

== Background ==
Rybak had been wanting to write a musical for a long time. The children's book was released in November 2015, alongside an album with songs that added to the storyline.

Rybak wrote all the melodies by himself, except for the melody of "Stjerner vår", which he took from a composition by his father Igor Rybak.

== Critical reception ==
Trolle og den magiske fela was met with favourable reviews in Norway. Dagbladet gave it a "die throw" of 5, while Aftenposten wrote that it was "a superb new adventure story that together with the music becomes a great cultural experience. The author calls the book partly autobiographical, but many children may recognize themselves in little Trolle".

== Tracklist ==
No.	Title	Writer(s)	Length
1.	"Den magiske fela"	A. Rybak	3:30
2.	"Du, bare du" (with Pernille Hogstad Stene)	A. Rybak	3:33
3.	"Være på vakt"	A. Rybak	2:57
4.	"Trollbinde Deg"	A. Rybak	2:32
5.	"Alvas vals"	A. Rybak	2:43
6.	"Danse for Trærne"	A. Rybak	3:37
7.	"Kom deg vekk" (with Anders Baasmo Christiansen and Pernille Hogstad Stene)	A. Rybak	4:11
8.	"Vakrere enn hun jeg hadd sist" (with Stig Werner Moe)	A. Rybak	4:11
9.	"Jeg vil være for meg selv" (with Pernille Hogstad Stene)	A. Rybak	3:37
10.	"Blant Fjell"	A. Rybak; T. Wærnes	3:28
11.	"Stjerner vår" (with Pernille Hogstad Stene)	I. Rybak; A. Rybak	3:23
12.	"Kom til meg" (with Stig Werner Moe)	A. Rybak	4:10
13.	"Venner" (with Pernille Hogstad Stene)	A. Rybak	3:22
Total length:			45:22

== Musical adaption ==
In 2019, Kilden Theatre staged a musical based on the book and album by Rybak. In this musical, Rybak played the main character of Trolle, Ingeborg Walther played the role of Alva, while Stig Werner Moe played Hulderkongen. The musical ran between 28 November and 28 December 2019. The musical received a "die throw" of 6 from several Norwegian reviewers.
