= Stormande hav =

Single by Timoteij
- Released: 2012
- Genre: ethnopop
- Songwriters: Kristian Lagerström, Johan Fjellström, Stina Engelbrecht, Jens Engelbrecht

Timoteij singles chronology
| "Het" (2011) | "Stormande hav" (2012) | "Tabu" (2012) |

"Stormande hav" (English: Stormy seas) is a song written by Kristian Lagerström, Johan Fjellström, Stina Engelbrecht and Jens Engelbrecht, and performed by Timoteij at Melodifestivalen 2012, participating in the second semifinal in Gothenburg, where it made it further to Andra chansen where it was knocked out by the Top Cats song Baby Doll.

On 25 March 2012, the song entered Svensktoppen.

== Charts ==
| Chart (2012) | Peak position |
|---|---|
| Sweden (Sverigetopplistan) | 34 |
