= Elisabeth Carlisle-Hollenbeck =

American singer-songwriter

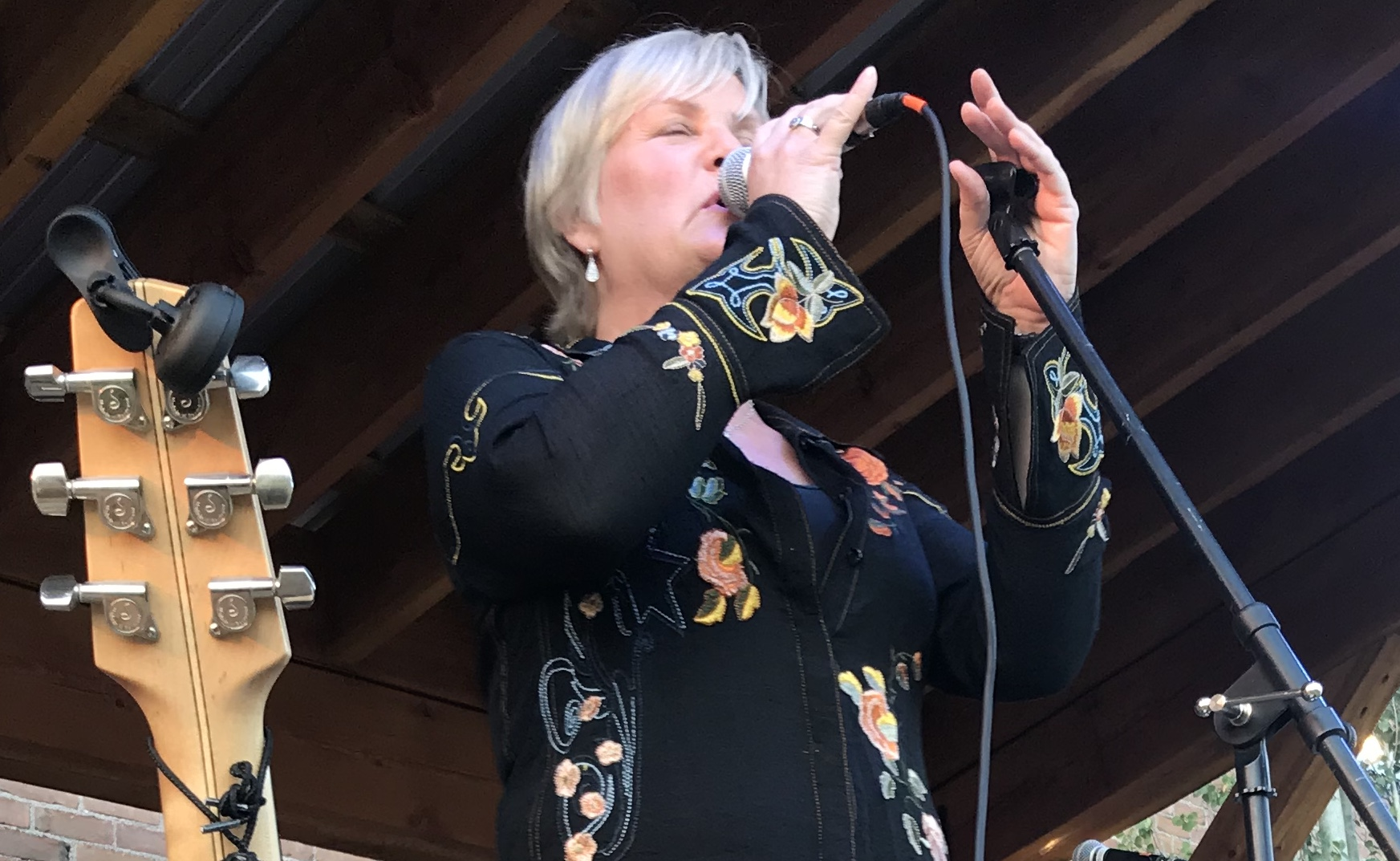
- Carlisle-Hollenbeck in 2018
- Born: May 5, 1963 (age 63); Santa Cruz, California, U.S.
- Occupations: Singer; Songwriter; Musician; Music Educator; Music Education Advocate
- Years active: 1982–present
- Spouse: Terry Hollenbeck (m. 2002)
- Musical career
- Genres: Americana; Pop rock; Folk
- Instruments: Vocals; Piano; Guitar; Clarinet
- Website: elisabethcarlisle.com

Elisabeth Carlisle-Hollenbeck is an American singer-songwriter, musician, music educator, and music education advocate born (May 5, 1963) in Santa Cruz, California.

== Early life and education ==
Carlisle-Hollenbeck was born to her parents, Joseph and Barbara (née Ruppel) Carlisle. Her father, of Norwegian descent, worked as an electrical engineer at Lockheed and her mother, of German descent, owned and operated a day care center.

Carlisle-Hollenbeck began playing the piano at five years old and the guitar at eight years old. She began writing songs and performing as early as elementary school. She is one of seven siblings. Her mother required that each of her children take music lessons, both privately and at school. Carlisle-Hollenbeck later took up playing the clarinet and marched in the high school marching band at San Lorenzo Valley High School. At UCSB she was classically trained as a vocalist receiving a Bachelor in Arts degree in music. She then moved to Los Angeles at 23 years old to pursue a career as a professional musician.

Carlisle-Hollenbeck attended the University of California, Santa Barbara where she earned a Bachelor of Arts degree in music with an emphasis on vocal performance. She earned a Master of Arts degree in teaching with honors in 2007 at Bethany University in Scotts Valley, California. She holds two teaching credentials; State of California Teaching Credential - Single Subject Music and California Career Technical Education (CTE) in Arts, Media, and Entertainment.

== Professional music career ==
While Carlisle-Hollenbeck attended the University of California, Santa Barbara, she helped to create the Coffee House Music Club for musicians and songwriters to showcase their music. She was also accepted into the 1984 Los Angeles Olympics Honor Choir and performed at the opening and closing ceremonies of the 1984 Summer Olympics in Los Angeles, California.

Carlisle-Hollenbeck moved to Los Angeles in 1986 where she began pursuing a professional career in the music industry. She performed in Los Angeles clubs such as The Troubador, The Viper Room, Club Lingerie, Largo, and more. She was briefly signed to a major record label, A&M Records on a speculation deal basis, working with guitarist, Jeff Skunk Baxter in 1996.

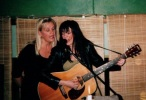
Elisabeth Carlisle and Meredith Brooks 2001

Carlisle-Hollenbeck had met Los Angeles booking agent, Howard King, in 1987, who offered her a contract playing piano in hotels in Sweden through Live Nation, formerly EMA-Telstar. While touring, she resided at Sheraton Hotels and Resorts in Stockholm where hotel management had a piano put in her hotel room so she could practice for performances and work on writing songs. She is now a band teacher at Scotts Valley Middle School and Scotts Valley High School.

In 1998, Carlisle-Hollenbeck began touring with recording artist, Meredith Brooks. In addition to being Brooks' assistant, Brooks invited her to be the opening act at several of her concerts as well as joining Brooks on stage as a backup singer. They co-wrote a song titled, My Future which Carlisle-Hollenbeck would later record and release on her second album, Roll With The Flow.

Her debut album, No Worries, released in 1998 was followed by a tour schedule that included shows with the Goo Goo Dolls, Tonic, Stacey Earle, Duke Robillard and, Meredith Brooks. Songs from the No Worries album earned her high rankings in the MP3 heyday. She was a featured recording artist in the MP3.com era and in the late 1990s was chosen to perform on the MP3.com music tour. Following the album release, No Worries, she alternated performing between Los Angeles and Sweden.

While living in Sweden, she began working with producer, Amir Aly, and a band of Swedish musicians. She began recording songs for her second CD, Roll With The Flow, which she released in 2004. She and her band performed at Sweden's Peace & Love (festival), as well as touring Northern and Southern California promoting Roll With The Flow, which included night clubs, LA's Viper Room and Moe's Alley in Santa Cruz.

After residing in Sweden, she moved back to Santa Cruz, California where she attended Bethany College and earned a Master of Arts degree in teaching and became a music educator and music education, advocate. Although she performs as a professional singer-songwriter and musician, being a music educator and music education advocate is now her full-time professional career.

=== Touring ===
- Meredith Brooks

Carlisle-Hollenbeck toured with Meredith Brooks in the US and internationally, sometimes as an opening act at her shows and sometimes singing background vocals. At the height of Brooks music career, having a #1 radio hit, "Bitch," Carlisle-Hollenbeck sang background vocals at such concerts as the 1999 Lilith Fair tour and on Penn and Teller.

- MP3.com

Carlisle-Hollebeck was one of the top performing recording artists to tour with other selected recording artists on the MP3.com Tour.

- US Tours

Carlisle-Hollenbeck toured with her band from Sweden in the US in 2004 to promote her album, Roll With the Flow and again in 2018 promoting her single, Beyond These Walls.

== Discography ==
Year	Title	Label	Artist
1998	No Worries	Glacier Records	Elisabeth Carlisle
2004	Roll With the Flow	Glacier Records	Elisabeth Carlisle
2011	EP	Glacier Records	Elisabeth Carlisle
2018	Beyond These Walls	Glacier Records	Elisabeth Carlisle

== Music education advocacy ==
Carlisle-Hollenbeck's music education advocacy began in 1985 while she was attending the University of California, Santa Barbara earning her Bachelor of Arts degree. She was majoring in music and vocal performance and wanted to learn how to record her songs professionally in a recording studio, but there were no recording arts classes at that time. She successfully petitioned for the university to reinstate the recording arts class.

=== Grammy Foundation Signature Schools Enterprise Award ===
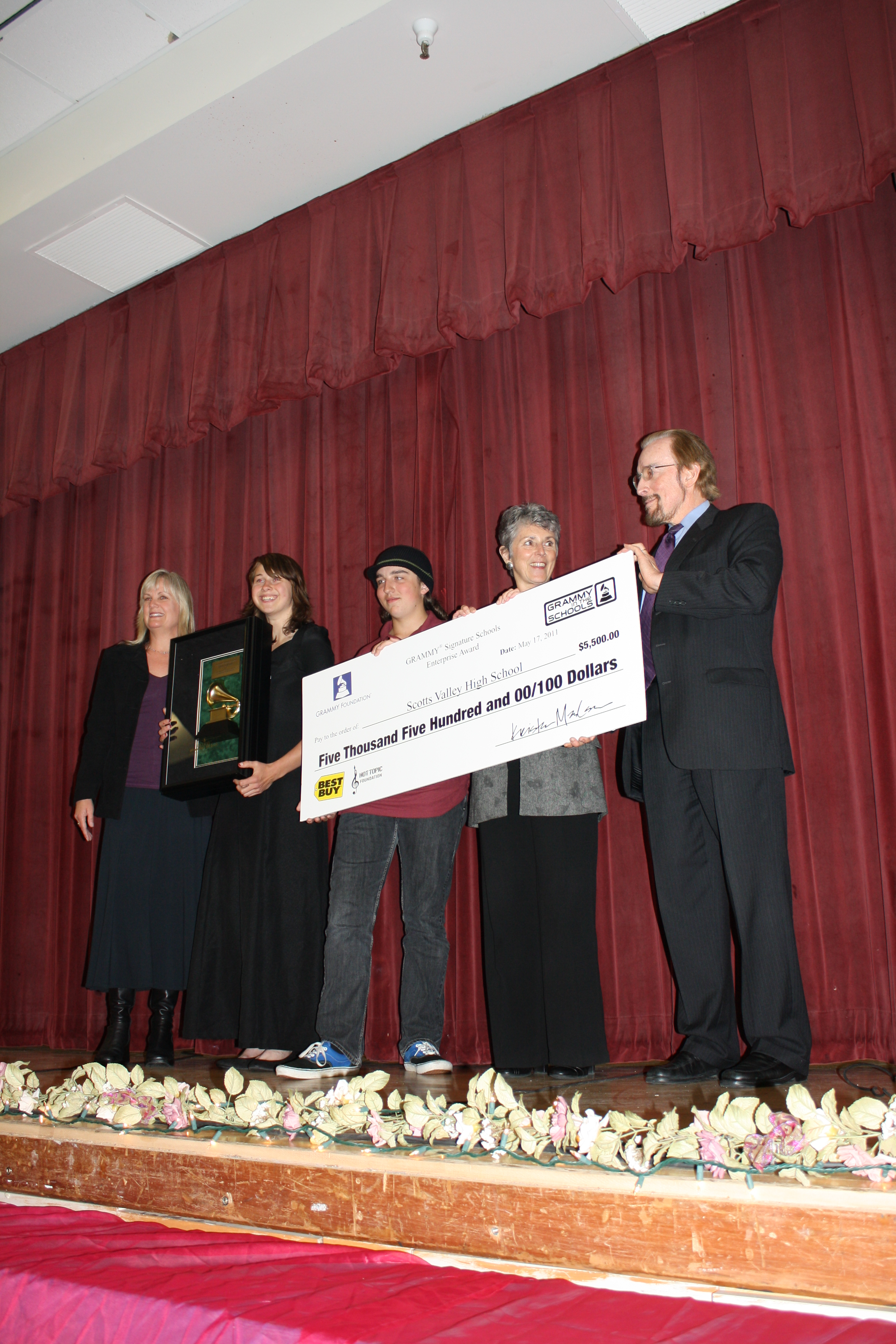
Scotts Valley High School - Carlisle-Hollenbeck (far left) GRAMMY 2011

As a music educator and director of the music department at Scotts Valley High School in Scotts Valley, California, Carlisle-Hollenbeck had collaborated with Universal Audio to build a recording studio at the high school. Due to lack of state funding, she applied for a grant from the Grammy Foundation in 2011 to assist in financing a Music Production and Recording Arts class for the recording studio. Scotts Valley High School was awarded the Grammy Foundation Signature Enterprise Award which includes a Grammy Statue, $5,500 grant, and a plaque that reads Designed to Honor High School Music Programs That are Underfunded by the State but Still Have Successful Music Programs Despite the Lack of Funding.

=== The NAMM Foundation ===
Carlisle-Hollenbeck began reaching out to additional non-profit organizations such as the NAMM Foundation on behalf of Scotts Valley High School for support of the newly developed recording arts program. The NAMM Foundation awarded the Scotts Valley Unified School District one of the Best Communities for Music Education Award in 2013, 2014, 2016 and 2017.

By receiving the NAMM Foundation Award, Carlisle-Hollenbeck's school district was offered the opportunity to participate in a nationwide competition to receive a 2-Day Residency from the John Lennon Educational Tour Bus.

Carlisle-Hollenbeck was a featured speaker for the NAMM Foundation's Education Day in 2015 speaking on the topic, Building a Recording Studio at Your School. In 2016, she was a speaker, discussing the topic of state standards for music production and recording arts.

=== John Lennon Educational Tour Bus ===
In February 2017, The Scotts Valley Unified School District was one of the three winning school districts chosen from a nationwide competition to receive a 2-day residency with the John Lennon Educational Tour Bus; a mobile recording and production studio. Carlisle-Hollenbeck's music students recorded an original song, Down By The River and music video over a period of two days on the Lennon Bus: On the second day, the school and district came together to demonstrate their support for music education with a Support Music Community Forum and rally. Led by The NAMM Foundation, the Forum shared the success and challenges in music education and recognized the accomplishments of music education within the district. The day concluded with a community celebration and tours of the Lennon Bus. The school also received music recording equipment.

=== Community fundraising to support music education ===
Carlisle-Hollenbeck partnered with Kiwanis to raise funds for music education for the Scotts Valley Unified School District. They raised approximately $20,000 a year for the school's music departments through their concert series at Skypark in Scotts Valley, CA. In total they have raised over $150,000.

=== Awards and recognition ===
- 2011 - Grammy Foundation Signature Schools Enterprise Award - Grammy Statue, $5,550 Grant - Scotts Valley High School
- 2013, 2014, 2016, 2017 - NAMM Foundation - Best Community for Music Education to Scotts Valley Unified School District
- 2014 - Scotts Valley Chamber of Commerce Educator of the Year Award to Elisabeth Carlisle Hollenbeck
- 2017 - John Lennon Educational Tour Bus Opportunity to Record an original song and music video as well as donating recording equipment and musical instruments to Scotts Valley High School.
- 2017 - Congressional Certificate of Recognition to Elisabeth Carlisle Hollenbeck from Anna Eshoo U.S Representative from California's 18th Congressional District for Outstanding and invaluable service to the community and honoring your service and commitment to your students and music.
