= Anna Maria Roos =

Swedish educator, writer and theosophist (1862–1938

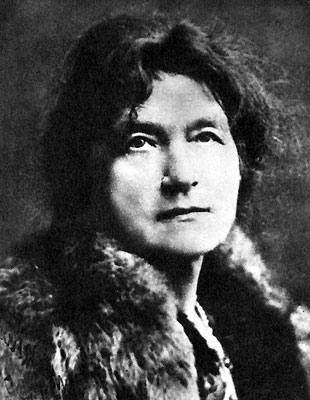
- Anna Maria Roos
- Born: 9 April 1862; Stockholm, Sweden
- Died: 23 April 1938 (aged 76); Bombay, India
- Occupations: writer, theosophist, song lyricist
- Writing career
- Language: Swedish
- Years active: 1890s–1930s

Anna Maria Roos (9 April 1862 – 23 April 1938) was a Swedish educator, author, theosophist and songwriter.

== Biography ==
Roos was born to Postmaster General Adolf Wilhelm Roos and Sophie Maria Roos née Nordenfalk in 1862 in Stockholm, Sweden. She was the granddaughter of Minister of Justice Johan Nordenfalk. Roos was the only girl in her family and had a tumultuous upbringing, reflected in her work. Her childhood summers were spent with her grandmother, Baroness Maria Nordenfalk, at Blekhem.

She was said to have been a voracious reader and learner. She was educated at the Högre lärarinneseminariet in Stockholm in 1879–1881. Roos was involved in the arts but her passion was for writing. Roos was a popular children's author, illustrator and songwriter. Her best-known books are Sörgården and I Önnemo (from Hem och hembygd), set in the village of Kålåkers in Törnsfall parish in eastern Småland; her mother was born and raised at Blekhem in Törnsfall, where her family had roots. The books were part of the series Läseböcker för Sveriges barndomsskolor, published by Alfred Dalin and Fridtjuv Berg.

Roos also wrote children's songs, such as Blåsippan ute i backarna står and Tre små gummor, and she was also a playwright, writing both story plays and short historical scenes for children.

She was an early member of the women's association Nya Idun and was the president of the literary society Samfundet De Nio. Roos was editorial secretary of cultural journal Ord och Bild from 1898 to 1902.

She died in Bombay, India, in 1938.

== Spiritual healing ==
In the 1890s, Roos took up the laying on of hands and spiritual healing at her own surgery in Stockholm.

== Selected publications ==
- Possibility of Miracles (1929)
- The Call of the Time (1933)
