= Oah =

Single by Alexander Rybak

from the album No Boundaries
- Released: 8 June 2010
- Recorded: 2010
- Genre: Pop
- Length: 4:19
- Label: EMI
- Songwriter(s): Alexander Rybak (lyrics & music), Markus Eriksen (music), Sebastian Dankel (music), Asmund Begre Jenssen (music)
- Producer(s): Eirik Heldal

Alexander Rybak singles chronology
"Roll with the Wind" (2009)	"Oah" (2010)	"Resan till dig" (2011)

"Oah" is a song by Belarusian-Norwegian singer–songwriter Alexander Rybak. It is the first single released from his second album No Boundaries. It was released on 8 June 2010.

== Background ==
Rybak wrote the song as an ode to one of his female backing singers, called Moa, as he wrote an ode to each of his three backing singers on his second album No Boundaries. Rybak started dating her in early 2010. The two broke off shortly after the release of the song. In 2014, Rybak stated that he did not regret the song, but would not do such a thing again necessarily.

== Critical reception ==
"Oah" was met with mostly unfavourable reviews in Norway. Dagbladet gave it a "die throw" of 1, stating it did "not surprise, have the exotic x-factor or, under any circumstances, be funny. It is just a hopeless, clumsy and plump affair that does not communicate in any direction." VG also gave the song a "die throw" of 1.

== Music video ==
In 2010, A music video was made for the single. It was directed by Lars Kristian Flemmen, produced by Eirik Heldal and shot by Martin J. Edelsteen.

At the start of the music video Alexander asks a girl named Moa to go out with him. However, Moa tells him that she does not want to go out with him and walks away from him, She goes to her locker opens it and teddy bears fall on her with a note attached saying "So, lets start by being friends". She throws it away and goes to class, where Alexander sits beside her and starts singing to her again. For the remainder of the video, he closely follows her in a daily activities, while declaring her his love.

The music video has accustomed over 19 million views per July 2020 on YouTube, making it Rybak's third most popular music video after "Kotik" and "Europe's Skies".

== Track listing ==
Digital download
No.	Title	Writer(s)	Length
1.	"Oah"	Rybak; Eriksen; Dankel; Jenssen	4:19

== Personnel ==
Lead vocals

- Alexander Rybak

Recording and production staff

- Sergio Raminez – Editor
- Eirik Heldal – Producer

Costumes

- Jeanette Hoff

Art department

- Patrik Svaningen
- Ann-Kristin Olson

Make-up

- Katharina Sørensen
- Tormod Hauge

== Release history ==
Region	Date	Format
Norway	8 June 2010	CD single, Digital download
Worldwide	8 June 2010	CD single, Digital download

== Other versions ==
Rybak also recorded and released a Russian version of this song called "Strela Amura" (Russian: Стрела Амура, Cupid's arrow) with lyrics by Anna Nikolaichuk. A music video was shot by Oleksandr Filatovych in Kyiv and released in June 2012 by both Rybak's own music channel and ELLO. By July 2020, the music video had reached to over 10 million views.

In 2014, Norwegian musician Øivind Elgenes made a cover of the song as part of Alexander Rybak's day on the musical programme Hver gang vi møtes.
