= Christmas Tales =

Studio album by Alexander Rybak
- Released: 23 November 2012
- Recorded: 2012
- Genre: Pop
- Label: Grappa Musikkforlag AS

Alexander Rybak chronology
Visa vid vindens ängar (2011)	Christmas Tales (2012)	Trolle Og Den Magiske Fela (2015)

Christmas Tales is the fourth studio album and first Christmas album by the Belarusian-Norwegian artist Alexander Rybak, it was released on 23 November 2012 in Norway. It peaked at number 34 on the Norwegian Albums Chart.

== Singles ==
The album's only single was the duet "Presents" with Didrik Solli-Tangen. Rybak re-released several songs on YouTube during winter season 2014.

== Track listing ==
No.	Title	Writer(s)	Length
1.	"The Christmas Song"	Wells; Tormé	3:59
2.	"Winter Wonderland"	Bernard; Smith	3:37
3.	"Let It Snow"	Styne; Cahn	2:16
4.	"Have Yourself a Merry Little Christmas"	Blane; Martin	3:46
5.	"Tell Me When"	Rybak	4:28
6.	"Santa Claus Is Coming To Town"	Gillespie; Coots	2:38
7.	"Baby It's Cold Outside" (featuring Annsofi)	Loesser	2:57
8.	"Rudolph the Red-Nosed Reindeer"	Marks	2:48
9.	"Presents" (featuring Didrik Solli-Tangen)	Rybak	3:44
10.	"Silver Bells"	Livingston; Evans	3:29
11.	"I'll Be Home for Christmas"	Kent; Gannon; Ram	4:51
12.	"Silent Night"	Gruber; Mohr; Young	4:11

== Chart performance ==
Chart (2012)	Peak position
Norwegian Albums (VG-lista)	34

== Release history ==
Country	Date	Format	Label
Norway	June 15, 2011	Digital download	Grappa Musikkforlag AS

== Personnel ==
Sourced from Grappa.

Performers and musicians

- Alexander Rybak - vocals, all strings
- Annsofi - vocals (7)
- Didrik Solli-Tangen - vocals (9)
- Knut Bjørnar Asphol - guitar, bass, percussion
- Hermund Nygård – drums
- Børge-Are Halvorsen – saxophone
- Jens Petter Antonsen – trumpet, trombone
- Pernille Hogstad Stene – backing vocals (8)
- Staffan William-Olsson - wind instrument (2)
- Amir Aly – guitar, bass (3)
- Robert Engstrand – piano (3)
- Petter Lindgård – trumpet, horn (3)
- Jens Lindgård – trombone (3)
- Peter Zimney – saxophone (3)
- Barrat Dues Chamber Orchestra - (5), (11)
- Anja Eline Skybakkmoen; Ane Carmen Roggen; Ida Roggen; Anine Kruse Skatrud; Leif Haugland, Hans Ole Hansen, Morten Midtlien - choir

Production

- Alexander Rybak - arrangements, production (5), (11)
- Knut Bjørnar Asphol - production
- Amir Aly - production (3)
- Sean Lewis - mixing (5), 11
- Torfin Thorsen - additional string arranger (6)
- Nils Thore Røsth - additional string arranger (11), concert master (5), (11)
- Børge-Are Halvorsen - wind instrument arrangement
- Hans Fredrik Asbjørnsen - photographs
- Håkon Ims - album design
- Frode Skaren - illustrations
