= Funny Little World =

Single by Alexander Rybak

from the album Fairytales
- Released: 13 May 2009
- Genre: Pop
- Length: 3:45
- Label: EMI
- Songwriters: Alexander Rybak, Henrik Wikström, Amir Aly

Alexander Rybak singles chronology
"Fairytale" (2009)	"Funny Little World" (2009)	"Roll with the Wind" (2009)

Music video
- "Funny Little World" on YouTube

"Funny Little World" is a song by Norwegian singer–songwriter Alexander Rybak from his debut studio album, Fairytales. It was released in Norway on 13 May 2009 by EMI Records as the second single from the album. "Funny Little World" was written by Alexander Rybak and produced by Henrik Wikström and Amir Aly.

"Funny Little World" received positive critical appreciation with most Norwegian critics. The song entered the Norwegian charts at #2 in its first week, only beaten by Rybak's own "Fairytale". "Funny Little World" was first released digitally as a Platekompaniet exclusive in Norway on 13 May, Alexander Rybak's birthday. The song reached the top spot in its second week.

Alexander Rybak performed an acoustic version of the song for the first time at a press conference at the Eurovision Song Contest 2009 in Moscow, Russia.

== Charts ==
When "Funny Little World" entered the Norwegian charts, it was the first time a Norwegian artist held both the first and second position in the singles chart. Technically, Kurt Nilsen managed to do this when he had his single on top, while his old band's re-release was at #2 in 2003. Otherwise, the closest was when Inger Lise Rypdal held the first and third positions in 1968.

Chart (2009)	Peak position
Norway (VG-lista)	1
Sweden (Sverigetopplistan)	4

== Release history ==
Region	Date	Format
Norway	13 May 2009	Radio, digital download
Denmark	25 May 2009	Digital download
Finland	25 May 2009	Digital download
