= Fairytales (Alexander Rybak album) =

Studio album by Alexander Rybak
- Released: 29 May 2009
- Recorded: 2009 at Kitchen Studio in Oslo, Norway, Yla Studios and Lionheart Studio 2 in Malmö, Sweden
- Labels: EMI (NOR, FIN, DEN, GER, AUT); Universal (RUS, GRE, CYP)
- Producers: Kim Edward Bergseth, Henrik Wikström, Amir Aly

Alexander Rybak chronology
Fairytales (2009)	No Boundaries (2010)

Singles from Fairytales
- 1. "Fairytale" Released: 12 January 2009; 2. "Funny Little World" Released: 13 May 2009; 3. "Roll with the Wind" Released: 2 June 2009

Fairytales is the debut studio album by the Belarusian-Norwegian artist Alexander Rybak. It was released in Norway and most of Europe on 29 May 2009, and in the UK on 15 June. Most of the songs on the album are written and/or composed by Rybak himself.

The first single of this album is Rybak's "Fairytale", the winning song from the Eurovision Song Contest 2009. His entry broke the previous record of 292 in the festival and achieved a total of 387 points. All the participating countries (naturally excluding Norway) voted for the song.

Rybak wrote English lyrics for one Russian and one Norwegian song, for the album. The chorus in the song "Abandoned" (track #7), uses music by Kirill Moltchanov, from the theme from the 1968 Russian film Доживем до понедельника (en. We'll Live Till Monday). The song "If You Were Gone" (track #6), is an English version of the Norwegian song "Vårsøg", with music by Henning Sommerro.

== Critical reception ==
Professional ratings
Review scores
Source	Rating
Allmusic	3.5/5 stars

On 27 May 2009 Norway's biggest newspaper Verdens Gang was the first to review the album giving it top score, 6 out of 6. "Alexander Rybak has not only become a star in no time, he deserves the status as well", the paper said. On the same day it was revealed that the album had been leaked illegally on the net. Norwegian newspaper Dagbladet was less enthused. "Rybak is seducing, but not entirely convincing" their critic stated, giving it 4 out of 6 points. Aftenposten gave it 5 out of 6 stars, calling Rybak "a complete artist." Swedish newspaper Aftonbladet, however, caused a stir by giving the record merely 1 star and hurling epithets like "violin hobbit" and "smurf hits" at the artist. TV2 in Norway gave the album 4 out of 6 stars, stating that Rybak was "no one-hit-wonder at all". NRK gave Rybak a good review saying that Rybak was "a good pop composer." Dagsavisen gave the record 5 points out of 6, exclaiming "the fairy tale continues!" The radio channel P4 Radio Hele Norge gave the album a rather poor review. Calling it a record for "13 year old girls and Eurovision enthusiasts" it got 2 stars. Bergensavisen was impressed by the record, especially by the album's "personal style", and gave it 5 stars.

== Track listing ==
No.	Title	Writer	Length
1.	"Roll with the Wind"	Mårten Eriksson, Lina Eriksson	3:34
2.	"Fairytale"	Alexander Rybak	3:05
3.	"Dolphin"	Rybak	4:16
4.	"Kiss and Tell"	Rybak, Kim Bergseth, Piotr Andrej	3:20
5.	"Funny Little World"	Rybak	3:46
6.	"If You Were Gone"	Henning Sommerro, Rybak	4:31
7.	"Abandoned"	Rybak, Kirill Moltchanov, Andrej	4:09
8.	"13 Horses"	Rybak	5:42
9.	"Song from a Secret Garden"	Rolf Løvland	3:30

Bonus track

No.	Title	Writer	Length
10.	"500 Miles"	The Proclaimers	3:24

Bonus track

No.	Title	Writer	Length
11.	"Vocalise"	Sergei Rachmaninoff	4:31

French edition

No.	Title	Writer	Length
12.	"Fairytale" (French lyrics)	Rybak, Thierry Samois	3:05

Russian edition bonus track

No.	Title	Writer	Length
10.	"Fairytale (Holter/Erixson Radio Remix)" (bonus track)	Rybak	2:53

=== Russian winter edition ===
Fairytales – Зимняя сказка (en. Winter Fairytales)

Standard-Edition

No.	Title	Writer	Length
1.	"Roll with the Wind"	Mårten Eriksson, Lina Eriksson	3:34
2.	"Сказка (English: Skazka (Russian version of "Fairytale"))"	Alexander Rybak	3:05
3.	"Dolphin"	Rybak	4:16
4.	"Kiss and Tell"	Rybak, Kim Bergseth, Piotr Andrej	3:20
5.	"Funny Little World"	Rybak	3:46
6.	"Когда Уйдешь (Russian version of "If You Were Gone")"	Henning Sommerro, Rybak	4:31
7.	"13 Horses"	Rybak	5:42
8.	"Song from a Secret Garden"	Rolf Løvland	3:30
9.	"Vocalise"	Sergei Rachmaninoff	4:31
10.	"500 Miles"	The Proclaimers	3:24
11.	"Fairytale (Bonustrack)"	Rybak	3:05
12.	"If You Were Gone (Bonustrack)"	Henning Sommerro, Rybak	4:31

Digipack-Edition

1. CD: Same songs as Standard-Edition

2. DVD:

No.	Title	Length
1.	"Fairytale (Video)"
2.	"Roll with the Wind (Video)"
3.	"Funny Little World (Video)"
4.	"Kupalinka (live in Minsk)"

== Personnel ==
Musicians

- Alexander Rybak – lead vocals, violin, piano, strings. All string arrangements, song arrangements.
- Amir Aly – acoustic guitar (track #5), guitar (#1, #6), bass (#1, No. 5, #6), programming (#1, #6)
- Gunnar Flagstad – piano (#9)
- Henrik Wikström – keyboards (#5), programming (#5)
- Jorunn Hauge – background vocals (#2)
- Kai Morten Berg – percussion (#4)
- Karianne Kjærnes – background vocals (#2)
- Kim Edward Bergseth – background vocals (#4, #7), guitar (#3, No. 4, #7), bass (#2, No. 3, #4, #7), programming (#2, No. 3, #4, #8)
- Laila Samuels – background vocals (#7)
- Mattis Lerbak – drums (#3)
- Sylvie Loche – background vocals (French bonus track: "Fairytale")

Recording and production staff

- Amir Aly – producer (track No. 1, #5, #6), mixing (#1, No. 5, #6)
- Björn Engelmann Cutting Room Studios – mastering
- Henrik Wikström – producer (#5), mixing (#5)
- Kim Edward Bergseth – producer (#2, No. 3, #4, No. 7, #8)
- Ulf Ø. W. Holand – mixing (#2, No. 3, #4, No. 7, #8)

Album artwork

- Baard Lunde – photos
- Guro Synes – artwork, design
- Trond Kulterud – artwork, design

== Charts ==
Chart (2009)	Peak position
Austrian Albums Chart	46
French Albums Chart	21
Belgian Albums Chart (Flanders)	13
Belgian Albums Chart (Wallonia)	62
Cyprus International Albums Chart	9
Dutch Albums Chart	29
Danish Albums Chart	15
Finnish Albums Chart	4
Irish Albums Chart	91
German Albums Chart	16
Norwegian Albums Chart	1
Polish Albums Chart	7
Russian Albums Chart	1
Swedish Albums Chart	2
Swiss Albums Chart	65
European Top 100 Albums	18

== Certifications ==
Certifications for Fairytales
Region	Certification	Certified units/sales
Russia (NFPF)	2× Platinum	40,000^{*}
Sweden (GLF)	Gold	20,000^{^}
^{*} Sales figures based on certification alone.^{^} Shipments figures based on certification alone.

== Release history ==
Region	Date	Label	Format
Armenia	29 May 2009	Universal	CD
Austria	29 May 2009	EMI	CD
Azerbaijan	29 May 2009	Universal	CD
Belarus	29 May 2009	Universal	CD
Belgium	29 May 2009	V2/Universal	CD
Denmark	29 May 2009	EMI	CD; Digital download
Finland	29 May 2009	EMI	CD; Digital download
Germany	29 May 2009	EMI	CD; Digital download
Kazakhstan	29 May 2009	Universal	CD
Kyrgyzstan	29 May 2009	Universal	CD
Luxembourg	29 May 2009	V2/Universal	CD
Netherlands	29 May 2009	V2/Universal	CD
Norway	29 May 2009	EMI	CD
Russia	29 May 2009	Universal	CD
Romania	29 May 2009	Universal	CD
Switzerland	29 May 2009	EMI	CD
Tajikistan	29 May 2009	Universal	CD
Turkmenistan	29 May 2009	Universal	CD
Uzbekistan	29 May 2009	Universal	CD
Ukraine	Universal	CD	
Cyprus	2 June 2009	Universal	CD
Greece	2 June 2009	Universal	CD
Sweden	3 June 2009	Lionheart	CD
Estonia	June 4, 2009		CD
Ireland	June 15, 2009	EMI	CD
United Kingdom	15 June 2009	EMI	CD
France	17 August 2009	M6 Interactions	CD
Poland	21 August 2009	Universal	CD
