= I'll Show You (Alexander Rybak and Paula Seling song) =

"I’ll Show You"

Single by Alexander Rybak and Paula Seling
- Released: 6 August 2012
- Recorded: 2012
- Genre: Eurodance, Euro disco
- Length: 3:33
- Label: CAP-Sounds
- Composer(s): Alexander Rybak
- Lyricist(s): Alexander Rybak

Alexander Rybak singles chronology
"Resan till dig" (2011)	"I’ll Show You" (2012)	"Leave Me Alone" (2012)

Paula Seling singles chronology
"I Feel Free" (2011)	"I’ll Show You" (2012)	"Pansament" (2013)

"I’ll Show You" is a single by Belarusian-Norwegian artist Alexander Rybak and Romanian musician Paula Seling. The song was released in Norway on 6 August 2012 as a digital download on iTunes.

== Composition ==
The song is written in the key of D minor. The verses follow the chord progression of Dm–Gm–C–F–Bb–Gm–Eb–A. The verses use circle of fifths, alongside a Neapolitan chord (Eb).

== Live performances ==
On 30 May 2012 Alexander Rybak & Paula Seling performed the song live on Romanian TV show Danutz srl, and Antena 1.

== Track listing ==
Digital download
No.	Title	Writer(s)	Length
1.	"I’ll Show You"	Rybak	3:33

== Release history ==
Region	Date	Format	Label
Norway	6 August 2012	Digital download	CAP-Sounds
