= Mats Paulson =

Swedish singer (1938–2021)

- Born: 28 January 1938; Linköping, Sweden
- Died: 19 September 2021 (aged 83)
- Occupations: singer, songwriter, poet, painter
- Instrument: guitar

Mats Paulson (born Maths Paul Ingemar Paulsson; 28 January 1938 – 19 September 2021) was a Swedish singer, poet, songwriter, and painter. He released his first disc in 1964; Tango i Hagalund. He wrote hundreds of songs, among them Barfotavisan, Baggenslåten and Visa vid vindens ängar. He worked together with artists, among them Alexander Rybak and Håkan Hellström.
