= Timoteij =

Swedish ethnopop group

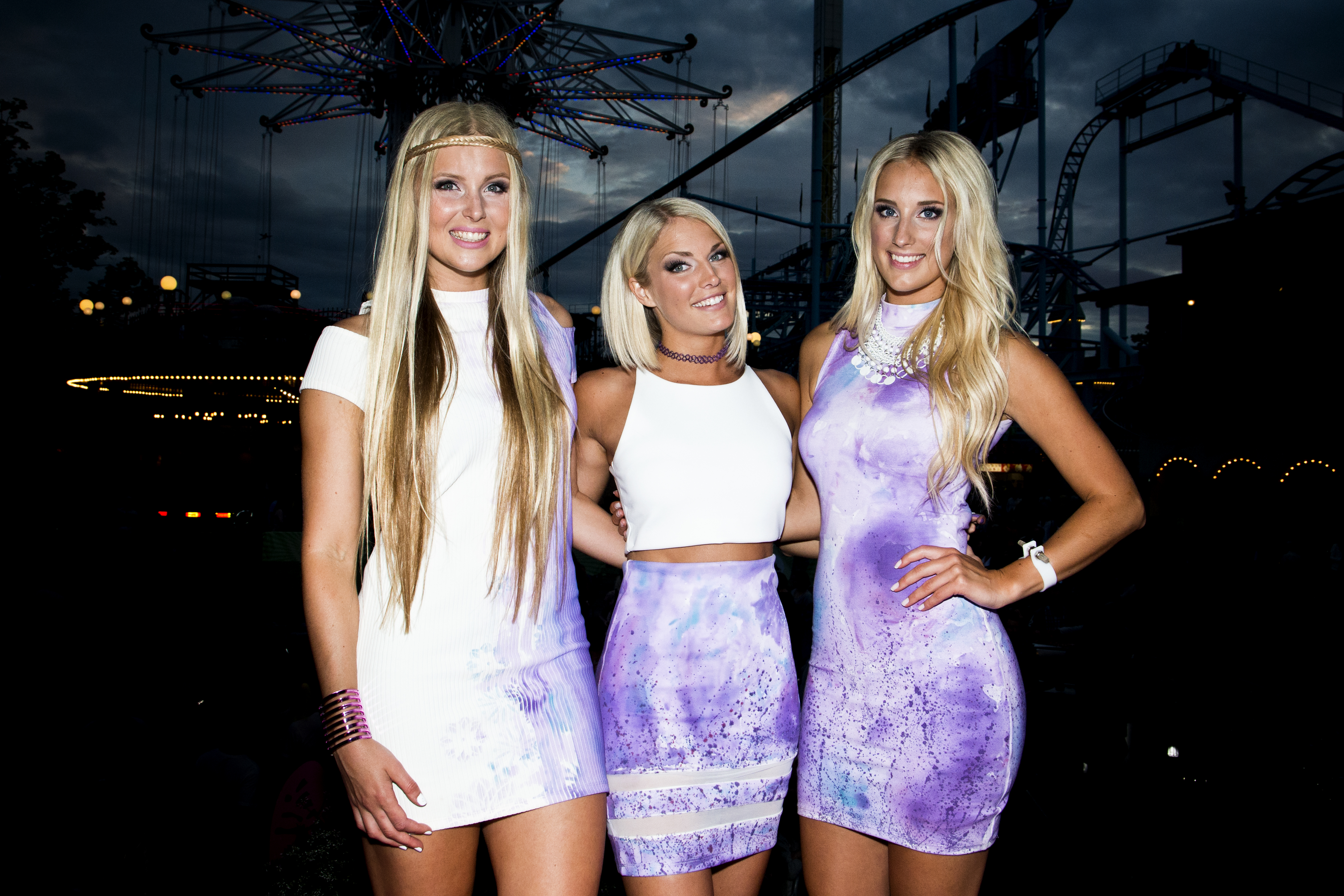
- Timoteij at Sommarkrysset 2015

Background information
- Origin: Sweden
- Genres: Europop; worldbeat
- Years active: 2008–2016
- Labels: Universal; Lionheart International
- Past members: Cecilia Kallin; Bodil Bergström; Elina Thorsell; Johanna Pettersson
- Website: www.timoteij.se

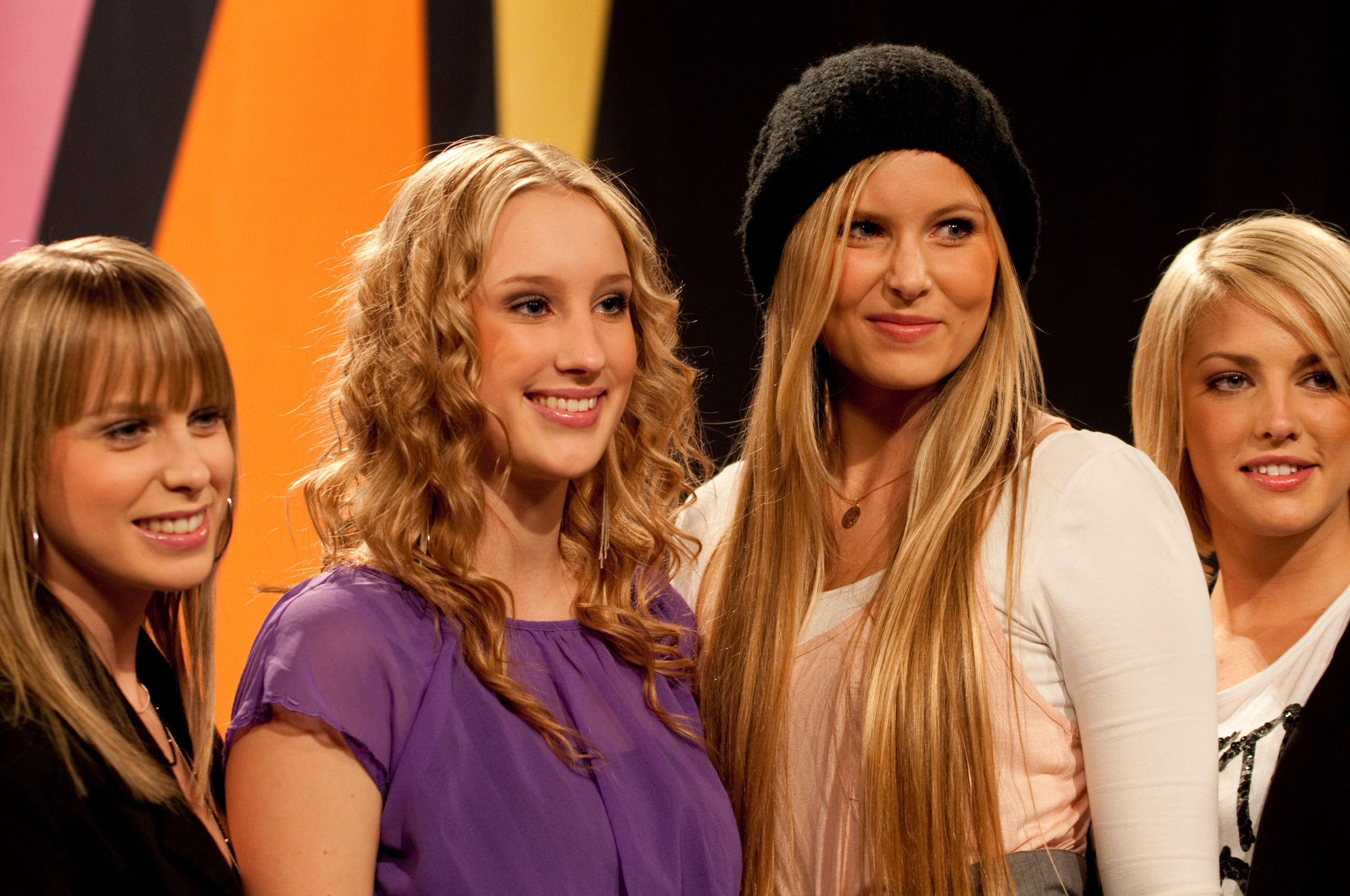
Timoteij during Melodifestivalen 2010

Timoteij were a Swedish ethnopop group established in 2008. The group originally consisted of Cecilia Kallin, Bodil Bergström, Elina Thorsell, and Johanna Pettersson, all born in 1991. Pettersson left the group in 2014.

== History ==
Timoteij participated in the Swedish Melodifestivalen 2010 with their debut single "Kom" written by Karl Eurén, Gustav Eurén and Niklas Arn. "Kom" finished first in the third semi-final of "Melodifestivalen" and fifth in the national final.

They participated again in Melodifestivalen 2012 with their single "Stormande hav". However, they failed to make it to the finals.

In Spring 2014, Pettersson left the band to focus on her dancing career, turning Timoteij into a trio." Their first single as a trio was "Wildfire".

In 2015, Bergström, Thorsell and Kallin, along with Kallin's brother Charles performed as backup singers and guitarists for fellow Swedish singer Erika Selin in Eurosong 2015 with "Break Me Up", coming third overall in the Final 5.

Prior to breaking up in 2016, the trio released the EP Under Our Skin.

== Members ==
=== Cecilia Kallin ===
Born on 4 December 1991, she is from Falköping. In addition to being a vocalist in the band, she was also a guitarist.

In 2015, Kallin participated in the national selection that selected the act to represent Ireland in the Eurovision Song Contest 2015 with the song "Break Me Up". Although credited mainly to Erika Selin, the performance also included Kallin and her brother Charles as accompanying guitarists and backup vocalists. The song was picked as one of the Top 5 for the live show final held on 27 February 2015 on The Late Late Show. The song placed third overall in the selection process, with "Playing with Numbers" by Molly Sterling winning to represent Ireland.

In 2018, Kallin released her first solo single "Runaway", accompanied by an official music video, followed by a second single "Don't You Wanna Know", which was released in the same year. The song was co-written by Kallin herself, along with Tony Nilsson. Swedish production duo 528 featured her vocals in the song "Unfeather".

=== Bodil Bergström ===
Born 20 June 1991, she is from Skara. In addition to being a vocalist for the band, she was the band's accordion player.

=== Elina Thorsell ===
Born 27 April 1991, she is from Skövde. In addition to being one of the band's vocalists, she was also the flute player in the band.

=== Johanna Pettersson ===
Born on 31 May 1991, she is from Tibro. In addition to being a vocalist in the band, she was the band's violinist. Pettersson left Timoteij in early 2014. She declared: "I'm leaving Timoteij! After four amazing years the time has now come for me to move on to work on my dancing career. I’m excited about what the future holds for me, and I’m starting off with spreading my wings in New York this summer."

== Discography ==
=== Albums ===
Year	Album	Peak chart positions
Year	Album	SWE
2010	Längtan: 1st Studio Album; Release Date: 28 April 2010; Labels: Universal/Lionheart International; Genre: Pop	1
2012	Tabu: 2nd Studio Album; Release Date: 16 May 2012; Labels: BGR/Musiccenter Records; Genre: Pop	2

=== EPs ===
Year	EP	Peak Chart Position
2010	Högt över ängarna	—
2016	Under Our Skin	—

=== Singles ===
Year	Single	English translation	Chart positions	Album
Year	Single	English translation	SWE	Album
2010	"Kom"	Come/Run	2	Längtan
2010	"Högt över ängarna"	High Over the Meadows	3	Längtan
2011	"Het"	Hot	–	Tabu
2012	"Stormande hav"	Stormy Seas/Stand by the Shore	34	Tabu
2012	"Tabu"	Taboo	–	Tabu
2012	"Ta mig till sommaren"	Take Me to the Summer	–	Tabu
2012	"Faller"	Falling	–	Tabu
2012	"Jag kommer hem till Jul"	I'll Be Home for Christmas	–	Non-album single
2015	"Wildfire"		–	Under Our Skin
2015	"Milky Way"		–	Under Our Skin
2016	"Never Gonna Be the Same Without You"		–	Under Our Skin
2023	"Come"		–	Non-album single

== See also ==
- Swedish folk music
- Sarek

Preceded by (Denmark) Hera Björk	OGAE Second Chance Contest winner 2010	Succeeded by (Iceland) Yohanna
