= Amir Aly =

Swedish songwriter and record producer

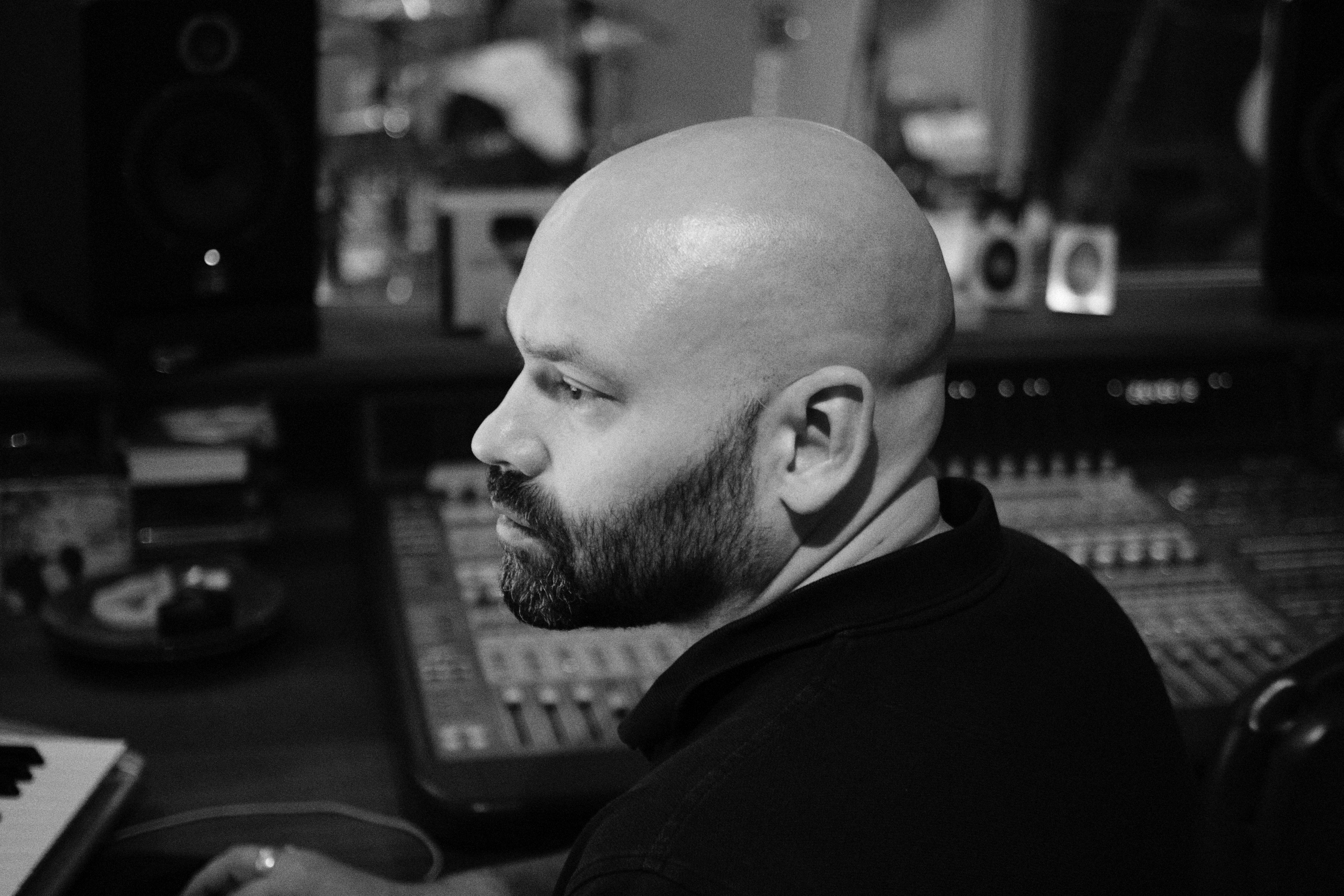
- Aly in 2014

Background information
- Born: 21 July 1976 (age 50); Sweden
- Genres: Pop, country, rock
- Occupations: Songwriter, record producer
- Years active: 2003–present
- Label: Yla Studios
- Website: ylastudios.com

Amir Aly (born 21 July 1976) is a Swedish songwriter and record producer. He has worked with some of the foremost artists in Sweden, including Jill Johnson, Elena Paparizou, Danny Saucedo, Robin Stjernberg, Sanna Nielsen and Shirley Clamp.

== Biography ==
Aly had a total of four songs in the Swedish semifinals to the Eurovision Song Contest (Melodifestivalen) in 2008 and 2009, and three more between 2011 and 2014.

In 2009 the Danny Saucedo single "Emely" (co-written by Aly) made it to nr 1 on the Polish charts.

Aly has produced three tracks on the winner of the Eurovision Song Contest 2009, Alexander Rybak's album (Fairytales) - "Funny Little World", "Roll With The Wind" and "If You Were Gone". In 2010, the second album from Alexander Rybak, "No Boundaries", was released, entirely recorded, mixed and produced by Yla Studios in Malmö, Sweden.

In 2012 Aly ended up in second place in the Malta pre-selections to the Eurovision Song Contest with the song "Petals On a Rose", performed by Gianni.

Aly produced the album "Pieces" in 2013, released by runner up in Swedish Idol (2012) Robin Stjernberg (who represented Sweden in the Eurovision Song Contest the same year). It qualified for gold the very first day it was released.

Since 2003, Aly has produced a number of gold and platinum records with Swedish country star Jill Johnson, with their latest collaboration being released in 2022. Their first collaboration, the single "Crazy In Love", made it to the finals in the semifinals to the Eurovision Song Contest 2002 and later earned them a Swedish Grammy Award. In 2013 Jill Johnson released the duet "Come Wake Me Up" with Rascal Flatts in Sweden.

Just before Christmas 2014 the track "Daddy's Still Around" (produced by Aly) was released by Doug Seegers, made famous by the TV-show "Jill's Veranda".

In 2015 Aly will participate with his 8th contribution to the Swedish pre-selections for the ESC.

In 2016 Aly wrote the song "Miracle", which was performed at the Eurovision Song Contest 2016 by Səmra Rəhimli for Azerbaijan and reached nr 17 in the grand final.

The album "For You I'll Wait" by Jill Johnson (recorded, mixed and produced) by Aly, was nominated for a Swedish Grammy Award in 2017.

In 2018 the album "Crossroads" by Sannex was also nominated for a Swedish Grammy Award.

In 2022, the documentary "De första 20 åren" about Aly and his studio was made by filmmaker Jörgen Lindström Larsson.

== Selection of artists Aly has produced ==
- Jill Johnson
- Səmra Rəhimli
- Elena Paparizou
- Robin Stjernberg
- Sanna Nielsen
- Shirley Clamp
- Sonja Aldén
- Alexander Rybak
- Maria Haukaas Storeng
- Nanne Grönvall
- Doug Seegers
- Rongedal
- Uno Svenningsson
- Anna Sahlene
- Meredith Brooks
- Liberator
- Elisabeth Carlisle-Hollenbeck
- Jon Strider

== Selection of songwriters Aly has co-written with ==
- Oscar Holter
- Jakke Erixon
- Eric Bazilian
- Bobby Ljunggren
- Henrik Wikström
- Aleena Gibson
- Fredrik Kempe
- Ingela "Pling" Forsman
- Thomas G:son

== General references ==
- Lionheart International
- Lionheart Music
- Alexander Rybak - No Boundaries
