= Blåsippor =

Song
- Language: Swedish
- Published: 1894 (as a poem); 1895 (as a song)
- Genre: children
- Songwriter(s): Anna Maria Roos
- Composer(s): Alice Tegnér

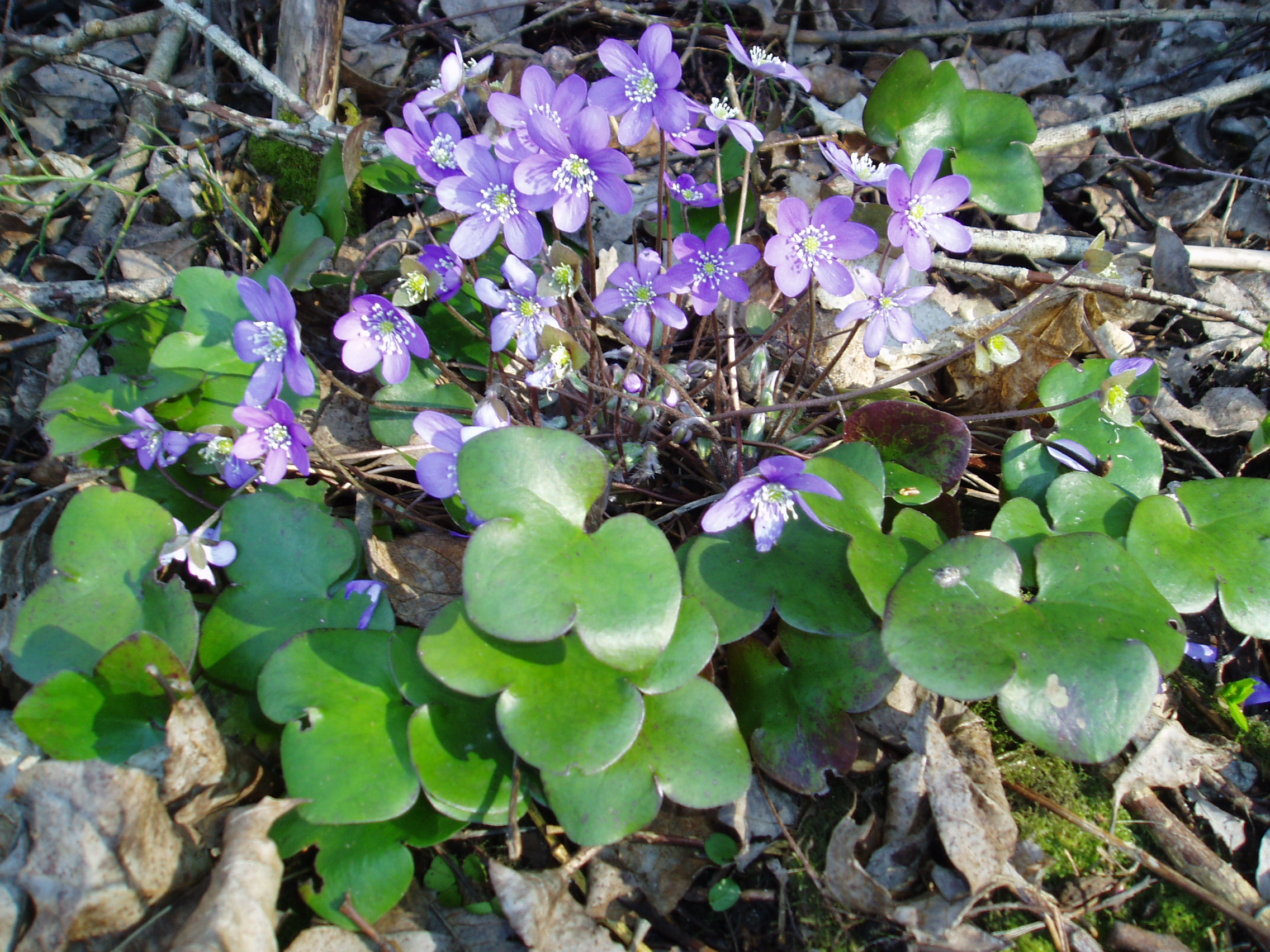
Anemone hepatica (Swedish: Blåsippa), the subject of the song

Blåsippor, also known after the opening words Blåsippan ute i backarna står, is a children's springtime song with lyrics written by Anna Maria Roos. It was originally published as a poem in Lilla Elnas sagor in 1894. It was set to music by Alice Tegnér and published as a song in 1895 in volume 3 of Sjung med oss, mamma!.

== Publications ==
- Sjung med oss, mamma!, volume 3, 1895
- Nu ska vi sjunga, 1943, under the lines "Visor om djur och blommor" ("Songs about animals and flowers")

== Recordings ==
Sylvan Beré and Knut Edgardt did an early recording inside the Stockholm Concert Hall on 19 June 1947, as part of a medley of children's songs released on a record in December that year. The song has also been recorded by Ingela "Pling" Forsman on a 1975 album with songs from the songbook "Nu ska vi sjunga".
