= Visa vid vindens ängar =

Studio album by Alexander Rybak
- Released: 15 June 2011
- Recorded: 2010–11
- Genres: Pop, rock
- Label: Alexander Rybak AS

Alexander Rybak chronology
| No Boundaries (2010) | Visa vid vindens ängar (2011) | Christmas Tales (2012) |

Singles from Visa vid vindens ängar
- 1. "Resan till dig" Released: 8 June 2011

Visa vid vindens ängar is the third studio album by the Belarusian-Norwegian artist Alexander Rybak, released on 15 June 2011 in Norway. It peaked at No. 7 on the Norwegian Albums Chart.

== Singles ==
- "Resan till dig" was the first single from the album released on 8 June 2011 as a digital download in Norway.

== Track list ==
| No. | Title | Length |
|---|---|---|
| 1. | "Träden i Villa Borghese" | 3:16 |
| 2. | "Din första kyss" | 3:14 |
| 3. | "Resan till dig" | 4:01 |
| 4. | "Visa vid vindens ängar" | 2:52 |
| 5. | "En katt på min kudde" | 3:31 |
| 6. | "Den lyssnande blomman" | 2:43 |
| 7. | "Maria" | 3:29 |
| 8. | "I ditt sommarhus" | 2:54 |
| 9. | "Till en vildmarkspoet" | 4:00 |
| 10. | "Jag föddes ur havet" | 4:27 |

== Charts ==
| Chart (2011) | Peak position |
|---|---|
| Norwegian Albums Chart | 7 |
| Swedish Albums Chart | 40 |

== Release history ==
| Country | Date | Format |
|---|---|---|
| Norway | 15 June 2011 | Digital download |
