= Fairytale (Alexander Rybak song) =

2009 song by Alexander Rybak

Single by Alexander Rybak

from the album Fairytales
- Released: 12 January 2009
- Recorded: 2008
- Genre: folk
- Length: 3:03
- Label: EMI
- Songwriter: Alexander Rybak
- Producer: Kim Bergseth

Alexander Rybak singles chronology
"Fairytale" (2009)	"Funny Little World" (2009)

Music video
- "Fairytale" on YouTube

Eurovision Song Contest 2009 entry
- Country: Norway
- Artist: Alexander Rybak
- Language: English
- Composer: Alexander Rybak
- Lyricist: Alexander Rybak

Finals performance
- Semi-final result: 1st
- Semi-final points: 201
- Final result: 1st
- Final points: 387

Entry chronology
- ◄ "Hold On Be Strong" (2008)
- "My Heart Is Yours" (2010) ►

Official performance video
- "Fairytale" (Final) on YouTube

"Fairytale" is a song composed, written, and recorded by Belarusian-Norwegian singer-songwriter Alexander Rybak. It represented Norway in the Eurovision Song Contest 2009 held in Moscow, winning the contest. It is the first single from Rybak's debut album Fairytales released on 29 May 2009 just after the contest.

== Background ==
=== Conception ===
"Fairytale" was composed and written by Alexander Rybak. In February 2009, Norwegian media reported that the song is about Rybak's ex-girlfriend Ingrid Berg Mehus whom he got to know through the Barratt Due Institute of Music in Oslo. Rybak has since confirmed this. At a press conference in May 2009 he revealed that the song's inspiration came from the Hulder, a beautiful female creature from Scandinavian folklore, who lures young men to her, and then may curse them for all time. The Russian-language version of the song is entitled "Skazka" (Russian: Сказка).

=== National selection ===
Between 24 January and 21 February 2009, "Fairytale" performed by Rybak competed in the 47th edition of the Melodi Grand Prix, the national final organised by Norsk Rikskringkasting (NRK) to select its song and performer for the 54th edition of the Eurovision Song Contest. The song won the competition in the biggest landslide of the contest's history, becoming the Norwegian entrant –and Rybak the performer– for Eurovision.

"Fairytale" won with a combined televote and jury score of 747,888, in the biggest victory of the Melodi Grand Prix's history. The song received over 600,000 votes more than the runner-up, which made it the clearest win in the history of the competition.

=== Music video ===
The first official music video for the song, which was used to present the song before the Eurovision final, was Rybak's performance at the Melodi Grand Prix. The most recent video was of Rybak playing the violin and singing with his backing dancers behind him, where the background occasionally changes from white to black.

=== Eurovision (2009) ===
On 14 May 2009, the second semi-final of the Eurovision Song Contest was held in the Olimpiysky Arena in Moscow hosted by Channel One (C1R) and broadcast live throughout the continent. Rybak performed "Fairytale" sixth on the evening, following Poland's "I Don't Wanna Leave" by Lidia Kopania and preceding Cyprus's "Firefly" by Christina Metaxa. After the grand final it was revealed that it had received in its semi-final 201 points, placing first in a field of nineteen and qualifying for the final.

On 16 May 2009, the grand final for the Eurovision Song Contest was held. Rybak performed again "Fairytale" twentieth on the evening, following Albania's "Carry Me in Your Dreams" by Kejsi Tola and preceding Ukraine's "Be My Valentine! (Anti-Crisis Girl)" by Svetlana Loboda.

The backing dancers for the Eurovision performances, Sigbjørn Rua, Torkjell Lunde Børsheim and Hallgrim Hansegård, were from the Norwegian dance company Frikar, performing the folk dance halling. The backing singers, Jorunn Hauge and Karianne Kjærnes, wore long pink dresses designed by Norwegian designer Leila Hafzi.

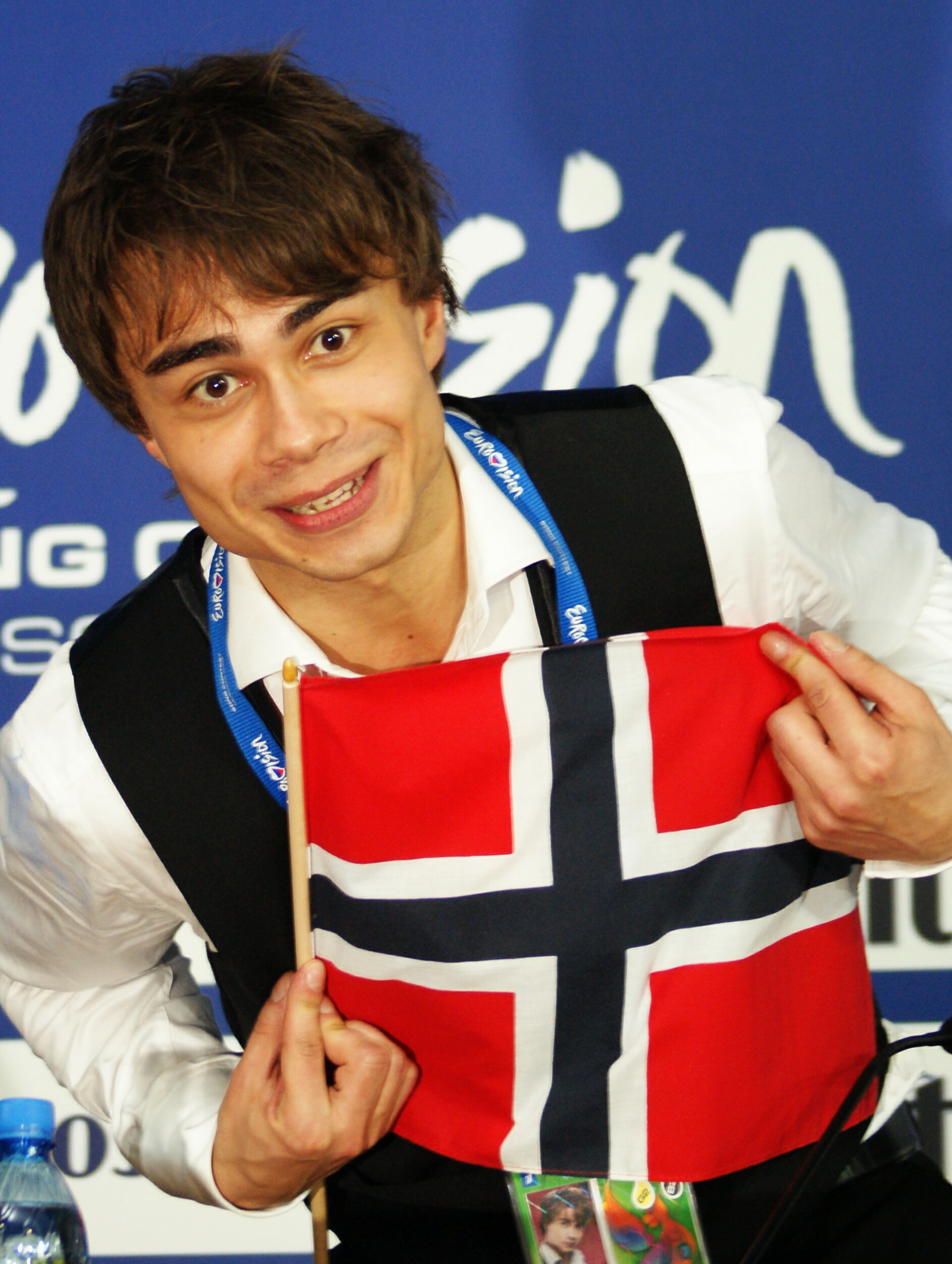
Rybak at the press conference after winning.

"Fairytale" won with the highest recorded score until then in Eurovision, with 387 points–out of a maximum possible of 492–surpassing the "Hard Rock Hallelujah" 2006 record of 292 by Lordi. It held this record until 2016 when "1944" by Jamala for Ukraine, the first self-written winner after Rybak, won with a record 534 points, but because of the new scoring system with separate sets of televotes and jury votes, the results are not comparable with each other. Its average score of 9.4 points from every voting nation was the highest since the wide use of televoting began in 1998. "Fairytale" received sixteen scores of 12 points, also a new record, surpassing the previous record of ten held by "Love Shine a Light" by Katrina and the Waves in 1997 and "My Number One" by Helena Paparizou in 2005; this record was surpassed in 2012, by "Euphoria" by Loreen, who received eighteen. This was Norway's first Eurovision win since 1995 and third win in overall.

=== Aftermath ===
The song was the first single from Rybak's debut album Fairytales released on 29 May 2009 just after the contest.

A video of Rybak's performance of the song at the Eurovision Song Contest final was chosen by YouTube as one of its 31 most memorable videos of 2009.

== Commercial performance ==
The song also debuted on the Norwegian Singles Chart on the week of 11 February 2009 at number 3, before rising to number one on the following week, the week of the Melodi Grand Prix final. This was the first time that the Melodi Grand Prix winner reached number 1 before winning the contest. The song remained at number 1 for 8 consecutive weeks. The song has since entered the Swedish Sverigetopplistan, debuting at number 47, before rising to number 7 in its third week, the week of Eurovision - eventually reaching the top spot. After the song gaining the Top Spot on Eurovision, it entered the Top Ten of many Charts across Europe, and also the No. 1 position in many countries. The song debuted on the UK charts at #10 on Downloads Alone and then dropped to #38 the next week, it also reached Number 3 on the Download Chart. "Fairytale" is the ninth non-UK Eurovision entry to reach the top ten in the UK charts since the contest began in 1956, most recently Johnny Logan reached #2 representing Ireland in 1987. It was certified Gold in Finland and Norway. The single went multi-platinum in different formats in Russia. It first went platinum as realtone full track and sold 100,000 copies. Then it was certified 2× platinum as ring-back tone with another 400,000 copies sold. Combined sales of the song are 500,000 copies without online downloads.

=== Weekly charts ===
Chart (2009–2026)	Peak position
Australia (ARIA)	67
Austria (Ö3 Austria Top 40)	10
Belgium (Ultratop 50 Flanders)	1
Belgium (Ultratop 50 Wallonia)	4
CIS Airplay (TopHit)	1
Czech Republic (IFPI)	95
Denmark (Tracklisten)	1
European Hot 100 Singles	3
Finland (Suomen virallinen lista)	1
French Digital Singles Chart	29
Germany (GfK)	4
Greece International (IFPI)	82
Hungary (Single Top 40)	14
Iceland (RÚV)	1
Ireland (IRMA)	2
Netherlands (Single Top 100)	2
Netherlands (Dutch Top 40)	14
Norway (VG-lista)	1
Russia Airplay (TopHit)	1
Scottish Singles Sales (Official Charts)	77
Spain (Promusicae)	35
Slovakia (IFPI)	34
Sweden (Sverigetopplistan)	1
Switzerland (Schweizer Hitparade)	3
Turkey (Turkish Singles Chart)	24
UK Singles (Official Charts)	10

=== Year-end charts ===
Chart (2009)	Position
Belgium (Ultratop Flanders)	48
CIS (TopHit)	57
Germany (Official German Charts)	46
Russia Airplay (TopHit)	114
Sweden (Sverigetopplistan)	1

== Certifications ==
Region	Certification	Certified units/sales
Denmark (IFPI Danmark)	Gold	45,000^{‡}
Finland (Musiikkituottajat)	Gold	6,887
Germany (BVMI)	Gold	150,000^{‡}
New Zealand (RMNZ)	Gold	15,000^{‡}
Norway (IFPI Norway)	Gold	5,000^{*}
Sweden (GLF)	Platinum	20,000^{^}
United Kingdom (BPI)	Silver	200,000^{‡}
Streaming
Greece (IFPI Greece)	Gold	1,000,000^{†}
^{*} Sales figures based on certification alone.^{^} Shipments figures based on certification alone.^{‡} Sales+streaming figures based on certification alone.^{†} Streaming-only figures based on certification alone.

== Release history ==
Region	Date	Format	Version
Norway	12 January 2009	Digital download	Original
Germany	15 May 2009	Digital download	Original
United Kingdom	17 May 2009	Digital download	Original
Germany	20 October 2017	CD-Maxi	Duet with Franziska Wiese

Preceded by "Believe" by Dima Bilan	Eurovision Song Contest winners 2009	Succeeded by "Satellite" by Lena Meyer-Landrut
