= Die throw (review) =

Method of review often used in Norway

A die showing 6 pips, representing an exceptionally good product

The "die throw" (Norwegian: terningkast) is a type of rating scale which is often used in Norway. It is characterized by giving a score from one to six, where six is the highest, using a graphic of the corresponding side of a traditional die, instead of the stars or letters used in other countries.

The format was introduced by film director and then-film critic Arne Skouen in the 31 March 1952 issue of Verdens Gang (VG), as a part of the newspaper's visual redesign. Skouen wanted to "characterize a film première in a short, concise form". The first film to be reviewed in this way was Divorced (1951), which received a four in the same issue.

Die throws grew beyond film when VG introduced "Rampelys" ("spotlight") in 1981, which collected a large number of previously separate content relating to culture and entertainment. To achieve visual consistency, and because writers were encouraged to be concise, die throws became common practice. This was originally criticized by people inside and outside of VG. However, the newspapers own research showed massively increased interest for cultural content when coupled with die throws, and VG became the biggest newspaper in the country the same year. Other newspapers soon adopted die throws for their own reviews.

Skouen came to deplore his invention, describing it as his "fatal contribution to the littering of the Norwegian press" in 1996.

== Usage ==
Today, die throws are used by many of the biggest Norwegian newspapers, as well as magazines, radio, and TV shows. An analysis in 2002 found die throws in 41 out of 254 daily newspapers in Norway. Outside of movies, it has been used to rate books, restaurants, music, and even politicians and municipality budgets.

Die throws are often used for blurbing and other promotional material as a quick, graphic way of expressing the worthiness of a product.

Writer Ari Behn gained some note when he, after receiving favourable die throw reviews, tattooed a die with 6 pips on his upper arm.

It is rarely used outside of Norway, an exception being the Swedish Svenska Dagbladet, which is incidentally owned by Norwegian media group Schibsted, the same as VG.

The die throw coincides with the grading system in Norwegian schools (excluding higher education), where 1 is the lowest and 6 is the highest grade, but this was introduced later.

== Misuse ==
In 1998, the newspapers VG, Dagbladet and Aftenposten brought legal charges against Nettavisen for extracting die throws from other newspapers' reviews and reprinting them. The three newspapers argued that this was an abuse of their reviews, since the die was taken out of context, and won the case in Oslo City Court.

Since high die throws, especially from prestigious publications, are often used in promotional materials, there have been instances of companies including "fake" die throws in their promotional material, i.e. die throws without corresponding reviews (or using their own reviews).
