= Alexander Rybak =

Norwegian singer and violinist (born 1986)

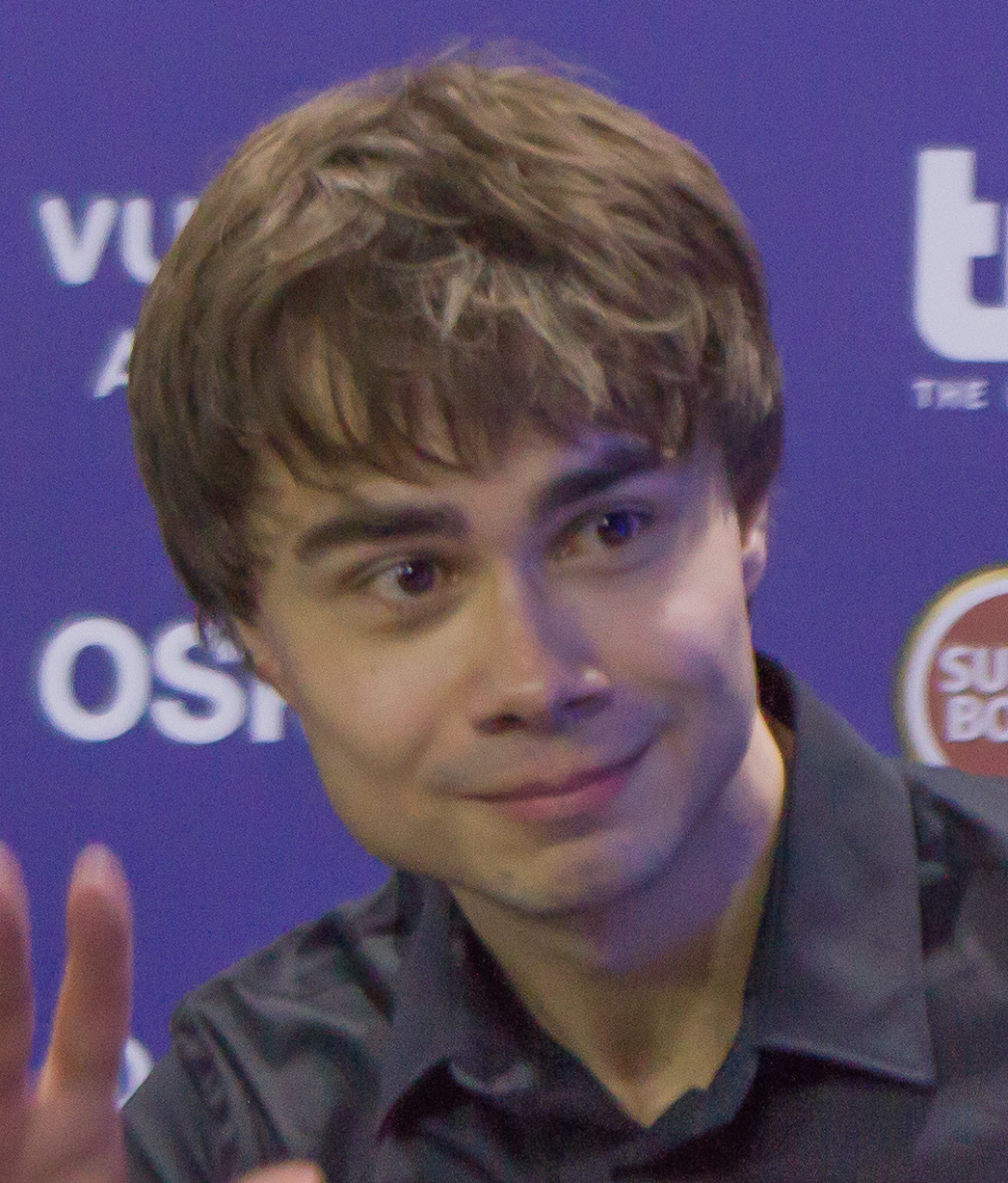
- Rybak in 2018

Background information
- Born: Alexander Igorevich Rybak; 13 May 1986 (age 40); Minsk, Byelorussian SSR, Soviet Union (now Belarus)
- Origin: Oslo, Norway
- Genres: Pop; folk; soft rock; classical crossover
- Occupations: Singer; songwriter; actor
- Instruments: Vocals; violin; piano; Hardanger fiddle
- Years active: 2004–present
- Label: Self-released
- Website: www.alexanderrybak.com

Alexander Igorevich Rybak (Russian: Александр Игоревич Рыбак; born 13 May 1986) or Alyaksandr Iharavich Rybak (Belarusian: Аляксандр Ігаравіч Рыбак) is a Belarusian-Norwegian singer, songwriter and actor. Based in Oslo, Norway, Rybak extensively worked on television programs and on tours in Europe, particularly in Scandinavia and Eastern Europe throughout the early 2010s. Performing in English, Russian and Norwegian, Rybak has released five albums.

His debut 2009 album, Fairytales, charted in the top 20 in nine European countries, including a top position in Norway and Russia. After two pop albums in Fairytales and No Boundaries (2010), Rybak switched to become a family-oriented artist, focusing on children's and classical music and frequently performing with youth orchestras.

Rybak represented Norway in the Eurovision Song Contest 2009 and won the competition with 387 points—the highest tally any country achieved in the history of Eurovision under the then-voting system—with "Fairytale", a song he wrote and composed. Winning at the age of 23, Rybak was the then-youngest solo male winner of the contest and the only Belarusian-born winner to date.

Since then, Rybak has been involved several times in the contest. He represented Norway again in the Eurovision Song Contest 2018 with the song "That's How You Write a Song", winning the second semi-final and finishing in 15th place in the final. He performed as an opening act for the 2010 final and as an interval act in 2012, 2016 and 2026. Rybak has frequently provided commentary on the contest, and also worked as a journalist in 2011, and as a judge on the Belgian national finals in 2016 and 2023.

== Early life ==
Rybak was born in Minsk, which at that time was part of Soviet Belarus. His parents hail from the town of Vitebsk in Northern Belarus. His father Igor Rybak, a well-known classical violinist who performed alongside Pinchas Zukerman, defected to Norway in the summer of 1991, after a concert tour of a Belarusian chamber orchestra which he was part of. Rybak's father lived with a musical family who gave him shelter and food in exchange for violin lessons for their son. Alexander Rybak and his mother Natalia Rybak (née Gurina), who worked as a music journalist and a piano teacher, arrived in Norway on a tourist visa and were initially refused a residence permit. Eventually, the Rybak family settled in Nesodden and received Norwegian citizenship after seven years in the country.

At the age of five, Rybak began to play piano but eventually picked up the violin as his main instrument. He stated "I always liked to entertain and somehow that is my vocation". He became a student at the Barratt Due Institute of Music in Oslo at the age of 10. As a result of his Eurovision win in 2009, he took a break from his bachelor's degree studies at the institute, but in 2011 he returned to his studies, and in June 2012 he graduated from the institute with a Bachelor of Music in violin performance.

== Career ==
In 2004, Rybak was awarded the Anders Jahre Culture Prize at the annual culture festival in Madrid, Spain. In 2005, he entered the Norwegian version of Idol, Idol: Jakten på en superstjerne, reaching the semifinal. In 2006, Rybak won Kjempesjansen ("The Great Opportunity"), a talent competition hosted by the Norwegian Broadcasting Corporation (NRK), with his own song, "Foolin". Rybak has collaborated with artists such as a-ha's lead singer Morten Harket and Arve Tellefsen. In 2007, Rybak played the fiddle in Oslo Nye Teater's production of Fiddler on the Roof and won the Hedda Award for this role.

=== Eurovision 2009 ===
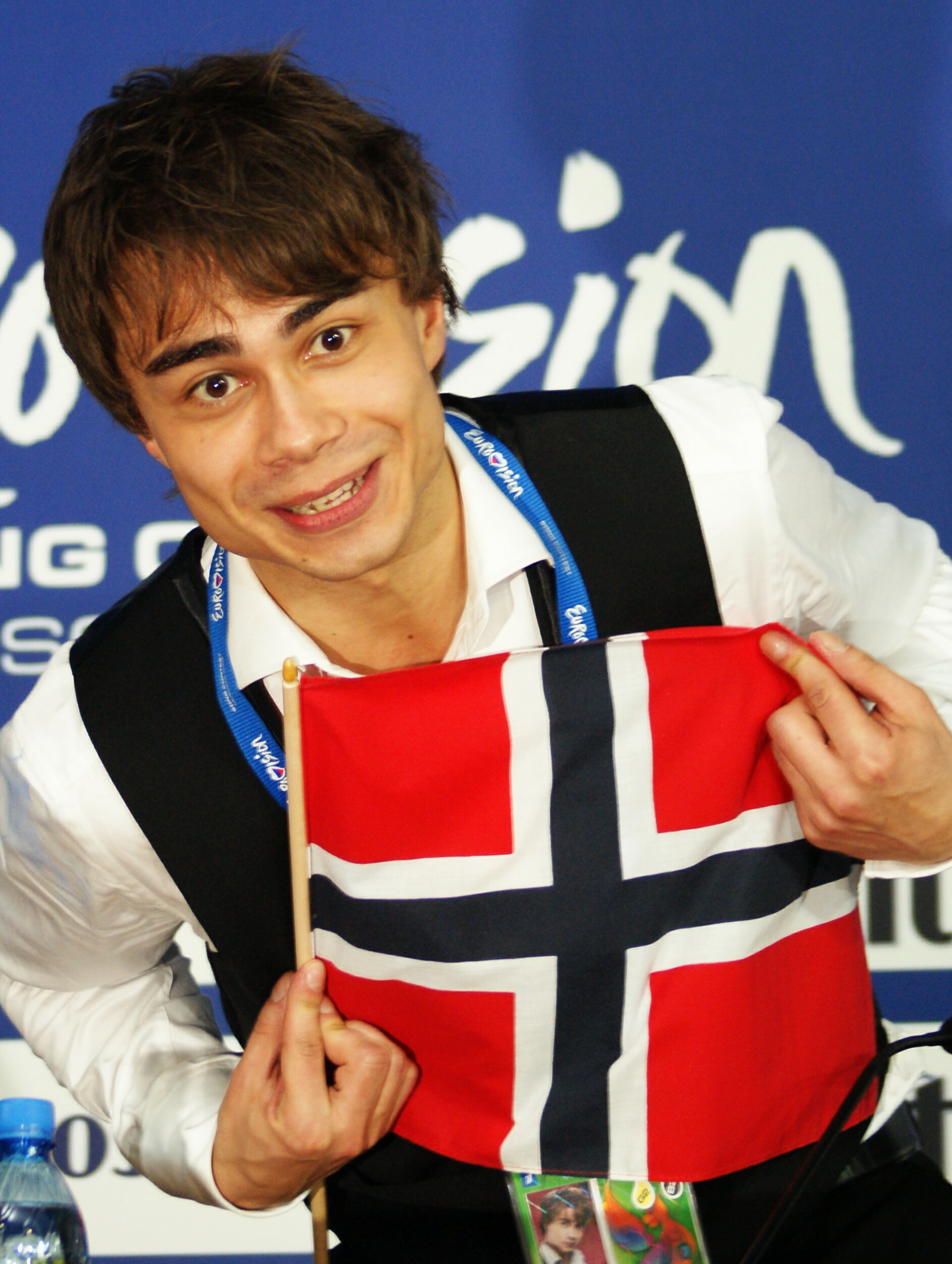
Rybak after he had won Eurovision 2009

Rybak won the 54th Eurovision Song Contest in Moscow, Russia, with a record 387 points, singing "Fairytale", a song inspired by Norwegian folk music. The song was composed and written by Rybak and was performed with the modern folk dance company Frikar. The song received good reviews with a score of 6 out of 6 in the Norwegian newspaper Dagbladet, and, in an ESCtoday poll, he scored 71.3%, making him the favourite to get into the final.

In the 2009 Norwegian national heats, Rybak achieved a clean sweep, gaining the top score from all nine voting districts and ending with a combined televoting and jury score of 747,888, while the runner-up, Tone Damli Aaberge, received a combined score of only 121,856 (out of a total population of less than 5 million). The song then competed in the second semi-final and won a place in the Eurovision final. Rybak later won the Eurovision final with a landslide victory, receiving votes from all the other participating countries. Rybak finished with a total of 387 points, breaking the previous record of 292 points scored by Lordi in 2006 and scoring 169 points more than the runner-up, Iceland.

=== After Eurovision, film and the first album ===
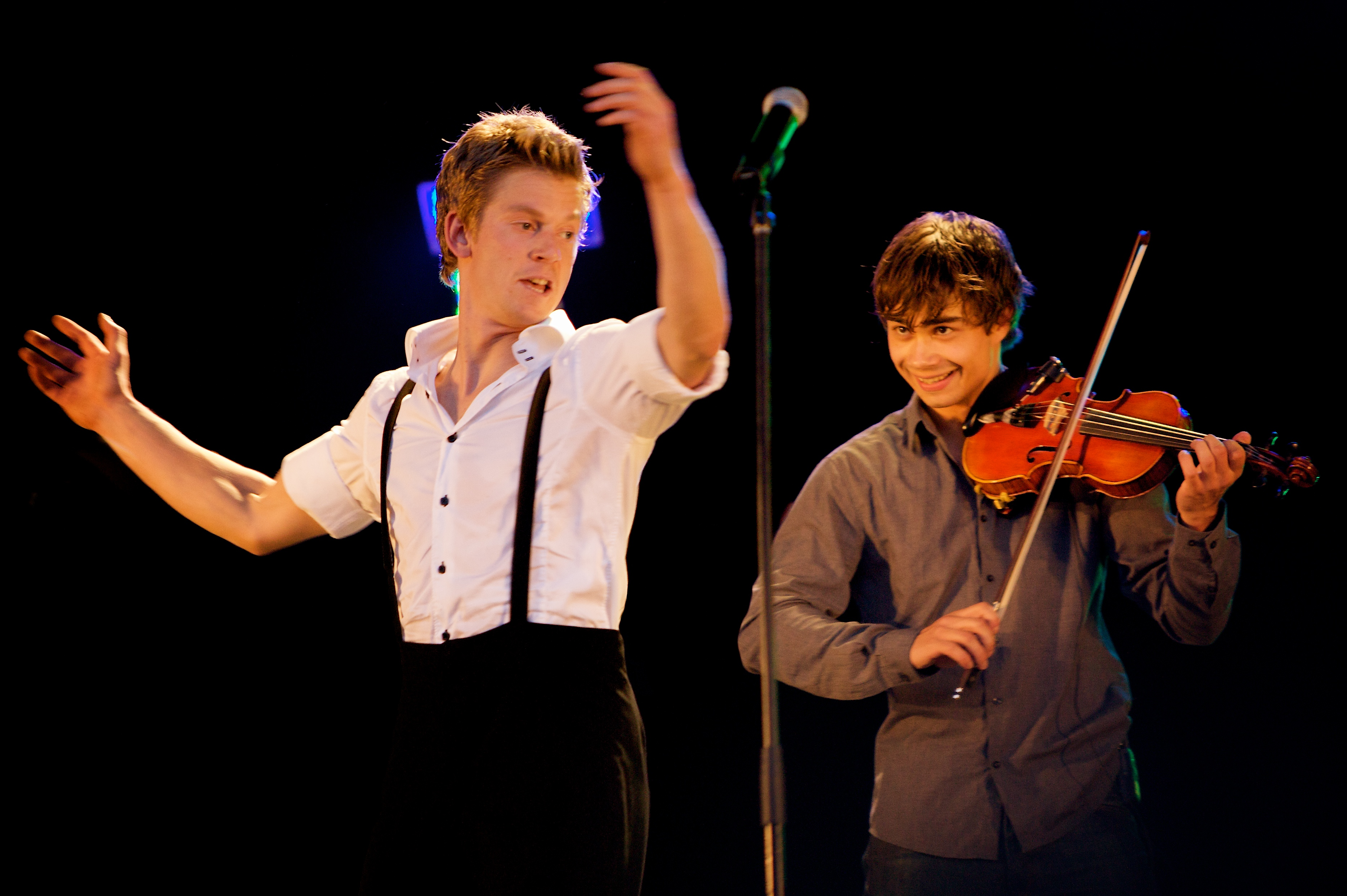
Rybak and a dancer from Frikar, at a concert in Norway, September 2009

Rybak's debut album, Fairytales, was released after his Eurovision win. Rybak also co-stars as Levi in the film Yohan directed by Grete Salomonsen, which was released in March 2010. Rybak also went on a tour in Norway with former Norwegian Eurovision winner Elisabeth Andreassen, something that had been decided before his Eurovision win and participation. He and Frikar also toured Norway and Europe in 2009.

In a December 2009 performance of his hit "Fairytale" at the Nobel Peace Prize Concert, held at the Oslo Spektrum, Rybak shared the stage with nine other acts. EMI Norway has just released a film entitled Fairytale: The movie, directed by acclaimed Norwegian director Rune Langlo, documenting the journey of Alexander Rybak since claiming the top prize for Norway in Moscow. That same year, he recorded the theme song, called "I Don't Believe in Miracles/Superhero", for the Russian action movie Black Lightning produced by Timur Bekmambetov.

=== 2010–2011 ===
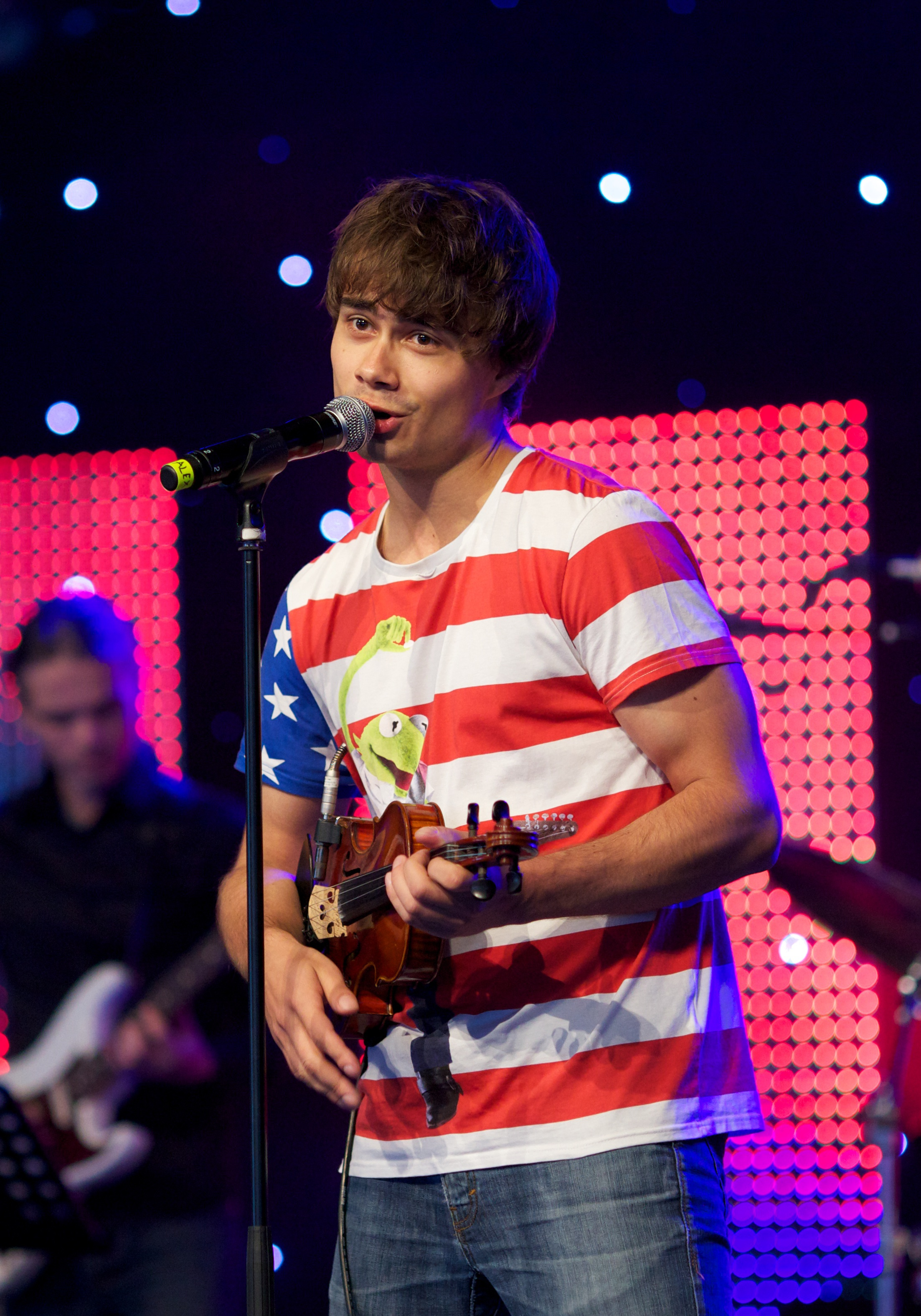
Rybak performing in 2011

On 30 January 2010, Rybak performed one of his new singles, "Europe's Skies", in the national final, Euroviisut 2010, to select the 2010 Finnish entry at the Eurovision Song Contest 2010. On 12 March 2010, Alexander Rybak performed his Eurovision 2009 winning song "Fairytale" on UK TV show Eurovision: Your Country Needs You. In April 2010, Rybak released a new song, featuring Opptur, called "Fela Igjen".

On 8 June 2010, Rybak released the first single from his second album "Oah". A music video was made for the single. It was directed by Lars Kristian Flemmen, produced by Eirik Heldal, and shot by Martin J. Edelsteen. It is filmed in a university or college. He also recorded and released a Russian version of this song called "Strela Amura" (Russian: Стрела Амура, Cupid's arrow).

Alexander released his second album on 14 June 2010, called No Boundaries. It was not as successful as his first album, so far it has peaked at number 7 in Norway, number 8 in Sweden and 32 in Finland. On 7 January 2011, Rybak was one of twelve contestants on the next Swedish season of the dancing show Let's Dance (Swedish version of television franchise Strictly Come Dancing), in the show Rybak danced to win the competition against other Swedish celebrities. Rybak made it to the Top 4 before being voted off on 11 March, having received the lowest scores from both juries and the voting public. In 2011 he released the album Visa vid vindens ängar, a collaboration with Mats Paulson whom he describes as "a legend and a great friend" On 11 December 2011, he appeared as musical guest on X Factor (Romania).

=== 2012–2013 ===
In 2012 he released a new music video for his Russian song "Strela Amura". "Strela Amura" is the Russian version of Oah which is one of his previous singles released in 2010. The music video was shot in Kyiv, Ukraine. Alexander said: "For me the main thing is what is going on inside a person, not the events around them. The video for the song "Strela Amura" is about me, about my life, which consists of the airports and hotels. You give happiness to others, and you are left alone yourself." On 30 May 2012, he released a duet with Paula Seling called "I'll Show You". Seling placed third at the 2010 Eurovision. The song had already been promoted on Romanian television and radio. The German label Capsounds has signed the song and will be promoting it throughout Europe.

A new single by Rybak titled "Leave Me Alone" was released worldwide on 12 October 2012. The music video premiere was also released shortly after the single which was on 23 October. The release of the Russian version of the song "Dostala" was on 12 November "Leave Me Alone" is about a particular female fan from Israel (but speaks Russian like many others there) who has been stalking him in various ways for quite some time. The new track which will be released during the day is co-written by David Eriksen who is well known to fans of the Eurovision Song Contest for writing "Butterflies" for Tone Damli Aaberge which was the runner-up to Rybak in the 2009 Melodi Grand Prix.

Rybak released a Christmas album on 23 November 2012 entitled Christmas-tales. Recording started in spring of 2012. Around the same time, it was revealed that Rybak wrote a song for Norwegian singer Annsofi for Melodi Grand Prix 2013. The entry "I'm With You" reached the final of the competition and finished fourth overall. In October 2013, he released a new music video called "5 to 7 Years". This was a gift he made for his fans after reaching 600,000 followers on Facebook.

=== 2014–2015 ===
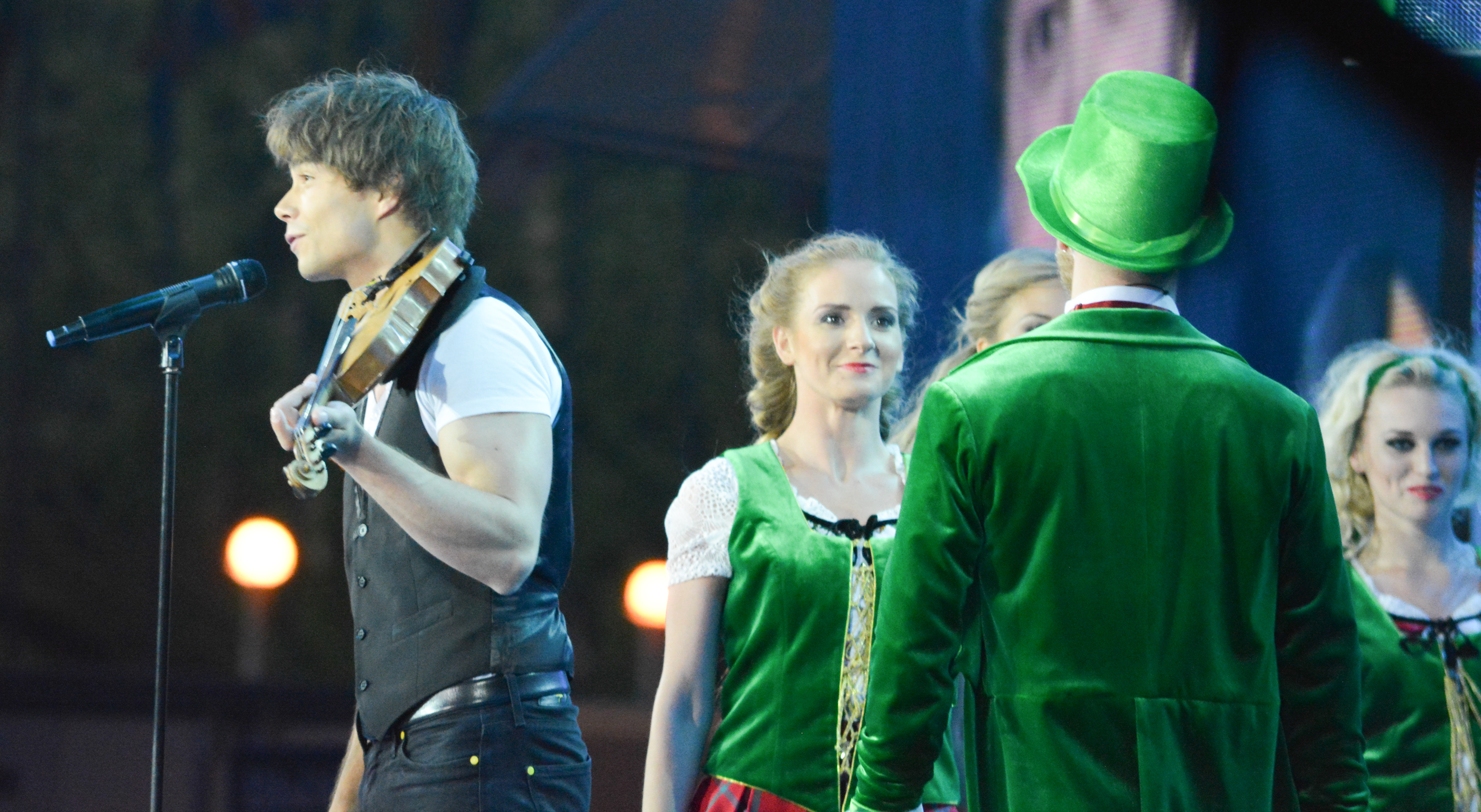
Rybak performing "Into a Fantasy" live during the opening of the Slavianski Bazaar in Vitebsk, Belarus in 2014.

Rybak recorded a song for the 2014 How to Train Your Dragon 2 soundtrack, entitled "Into a Fantasy". "Into a Fantasy" was added as a European and Slavic bonus track to the album and was played during the closing credits in the European and Russian releases of the film. Rybak had sent in the track unsolicited to film company DreamWorks, which was charmed by the song and decided to include it in the soundtrack for the closing credits.

On 4 May 2014, he released a song alongside another Eurovision winner, Marija Šerifović, titled "Gorka Hrabrost" meaning "Bitter Bravery". Rybak took part in The Hit, a live TV show on Norwegian broadcaster NRK on 10 October 2014. Rybak performed "What I Long For", a song written by Elisabet Mjanger. Despite it being the most played track ahead of the results show, it lost out to Trine Rein with "The Story of Love", which went on to eventually win the whole show.

Rybak wrote two entries for national selections for Eurovision in 2015. Rybak wrote a song for Maltese singer Franklin Calleja titled "Still Here". The song was received well and finished fourth in Malta Eurovision Song Contest 2015. In the Autumn of 2014, Rybak traveled to Belarus to form a girl band to represent Belarus at Eurovision 2015, after having thought about the idea for over a year. Auditions were held in five different cities across the country. In early November, Rybak revealed his girlband MILKI and shortly after that premiered their track "Accent". The song quickly became the favorite to represent Belarus at Eurovision 2015 among fans and receiving positive feedback from former Eurovision participants Marija Šerifović and Philipp Kirkorov. On 26 December, MILKI finished fourth in the Belarusian national final, receiving the second-highest tally of votes from the public. The result led to great controversy and Rybak critiqued the jury for putting the entry fifth.

In early 2015, Rybak took part in the Russian television show Odin v Odin!, in which the participants impersonated legendary artists. The premiere episode was broadcast on 8 February in which he impersonated Elvis Presley. Despite initially refusing to portray female artists, Rybak impersonated Gloria Gaynor, Conchita Wurst, and Russian folk singer Lyudmila Ryumina, for which he received top marks from the jury. After the fourteenth show, Rybak was placed 6th and therefore was not among the five who automatically went to the final. However, the judges said that he deserved a place in the final and made an exception. In the final results, he was the runner-up. With the televoting results, he took a clear second place with 32.1% of the votes, behind Ruslan Alehno.

Rybak released a new Russian single entitled "Котик"/"Kotik". The music video for this song was filmed in Moscow, Russia, and it was released on 3 June 2015. "Kotik" quickly reached positive acclaim and its music video attracted a lot of views. It topped Belarusian Bel Muz-TV's charts. "Kotik" became one of the most watched Russian-language music videos in 2015. Despite it being a hit online, "Kotik" did not manage to crack the Russian radio charts. Rybak later declared that radio DJs refused to play the song as they felt it was a childish song and some DJs were asking Rybak for financial compensation for playing it.

While announcing his desire to stay a children's musical in 2013, Rybak could not find the funds and support for this project. Instead, he decided to create a children's book with a CD with songs and an audio book attached to it. Rybak initially struggled to find a publisher for this, as most publishers were only interested in the physical book. Eventually, Rybak released Trolle og den magiske fela through Cappelen Damm. Quickly after that, the Danish rights were secured and the book was also complimented by Edward van de Vendel, who proof translated the book's first chapters into Dutch. On 12 June, a new Norwegian song "Blant fjell" (Among Mountains) was released.

=== 2016–2017 ===
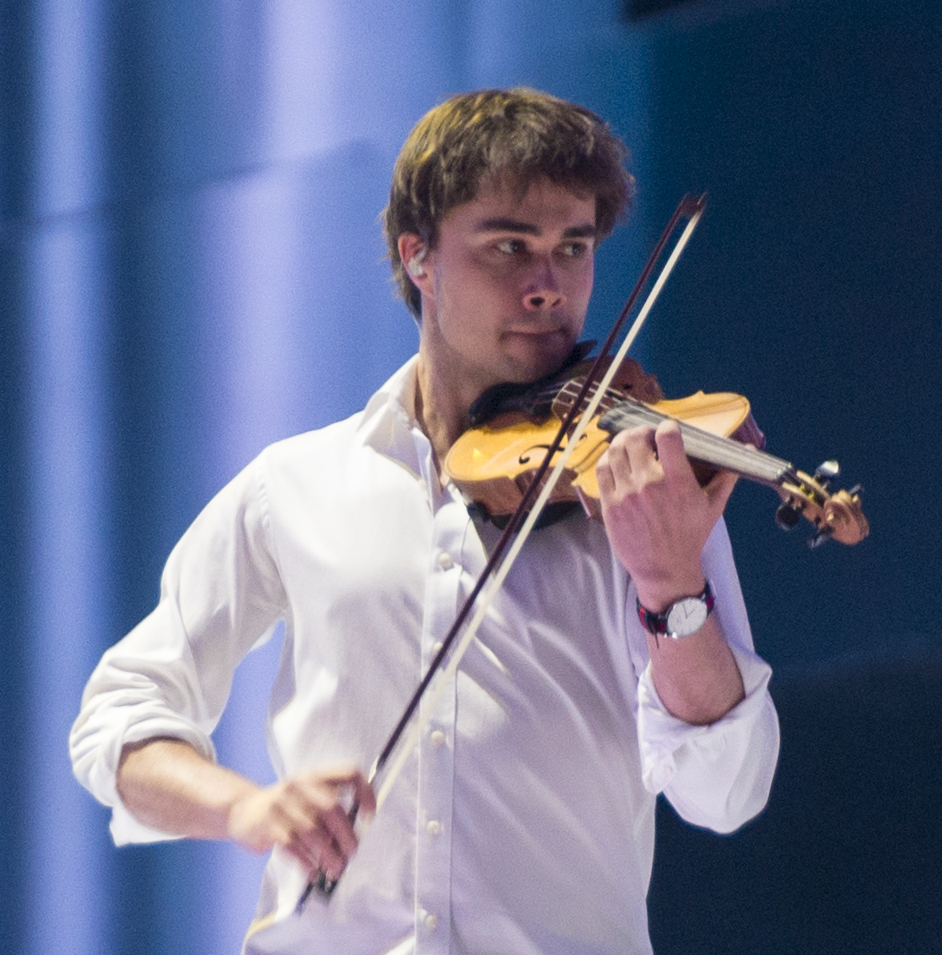
Rybak performing in the interval act of the Eurovision Song Contest 2016

In early 2016, Rybak was a one-off jury member in Eurosong, Belgium's selection for Eurovision 2016. Rybak also performed as a part of the interval act for the Eurovision Song Contest 2016, in a musical number satirizing Eurovision songs. Shortly after that, he released his lead single "I Came To Love You", which music video was shot in Greece. That same year, Rybak marked his ten-year anniversary as an artist by re-releasing former singles such as his debut single "Foolin'" and "5 To 7 Years". Next to that, he held several concerts under the title "Entertainer".

Rybak sang "Fairytale" during the final of You Decide, the preselection of the United Kingdom in the Eurovision Song Contest 2017. That same year, Rybak teamed up with German singer and violinist Franziska Wiese and had a duet with her on his singles "Fairytale" and "Kotik", while also performing the former at the annual Schlagerboom festival.

During Eurovision 2017, Rybak publicly supported Portuguese singer Salvador Sobral to win the contest. Sobral eventually won Eurovision with "Amar pelos dois", breaking Rybak's 2009 record. Rybak released his own version of the song, including self-written English lyrics. This version was later covered by others including Eurovision 2018 contestants Sennek and Ari Olafsson. Although Rybak previously disliked the idea of returning to Eurovision, he revealed in late 2017 that he was thinking of returning to Melodi Grand Prix.

=== 2018: Eurovision return ===
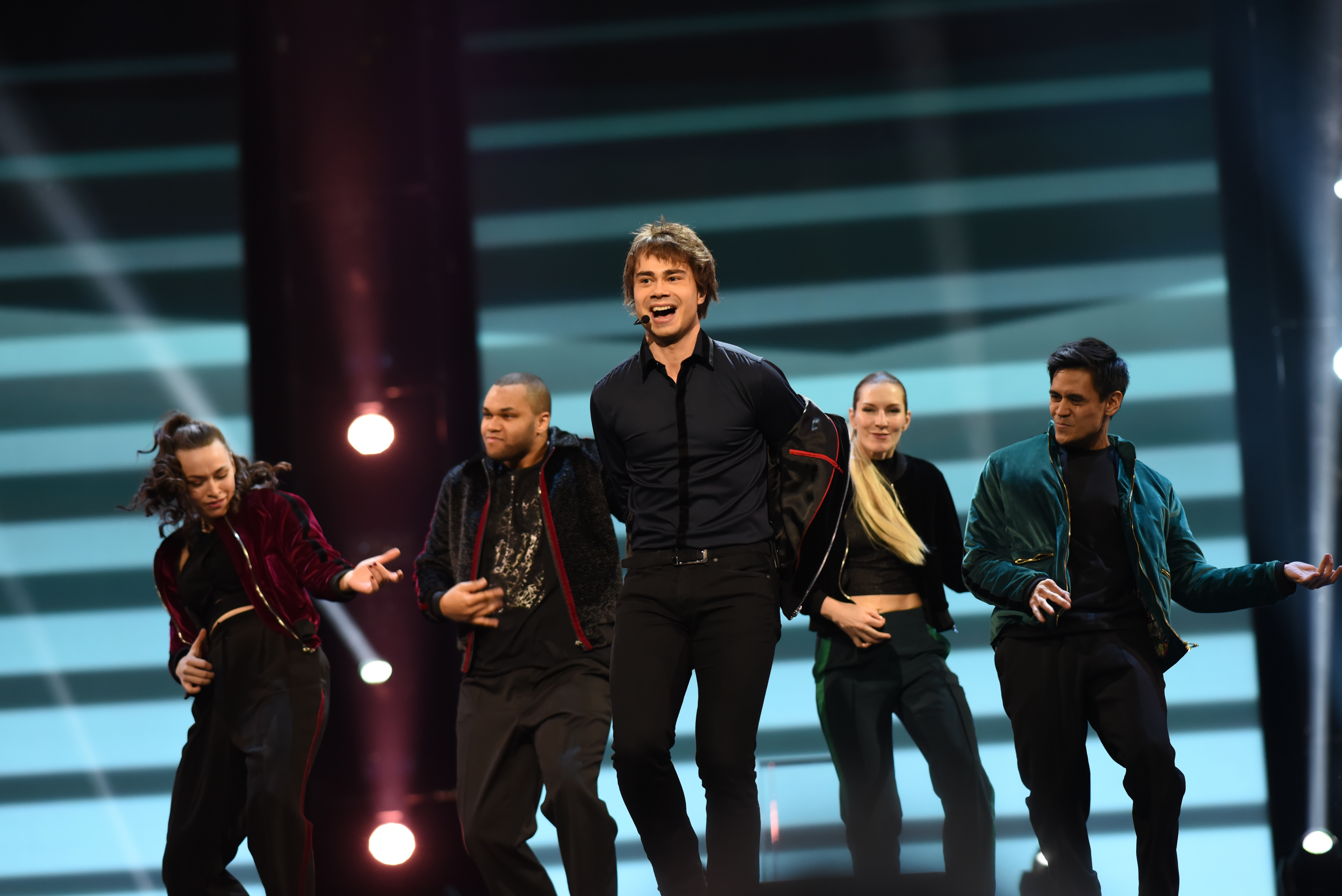
Rybak performing "That's How You Write A Song" at the final of Melodi Grand Prix 2018.

In January 2018, it was revealed that Rybak would be taking part in the Norwegian national selection Melodi Grand Prix 2018, to represent Norway in the Eurovision Song Contest 2018 in Lisbon, Portugal, with the song "That's How You Write a Song". The song initially received mixed reviews. Rybak stated that he wanted to take part mostly for pleasure, rather than wanting to win the competition, stating that Norwegian singer Jahn Teigen, who participated fourteen times in the Norwegian selection and won three times, was his inspiration.

Rybak was not the bookmakers and experts' favourite to win the selection, but topped several public polls ahead of the competition. To his own surprise and to the surprise of both of the presenters, Rybak won the selection. During the show, Rybak topped four international juries – Russia, Estonia, North Macedonia and Czechia – more than any other contestant. Rybak proceeded to the last four, where he first beat Aleksander Walmann in a duel and then proceeded to the final duel with singer Rebecca, which he also won.

After the show, several news outlets claimed that Norwegian broadcaster NRK had favourised Rybak, putting him last in the running order. NRK denied this, pointing to the voting statistics that showed that Rybak had won with a large margin. He won his first duel with 94.3% of the votes and his final duel by 71% of the votes, receiving a total of 306,393 votes, the third-highest number of votes an entry ever reached in Melodi Grand Prix history. Rybak was drawn to perform first in the second semi-final on 10 May and finished first overall, becoming the first-ever Eurovision performer to win two semi-finals after he also won the second semi-final in 2009. In the final, on 12 May 2018, Rybak performed seventh in the running order and finished in fifteenth place, receiving a top jury score from Italy.

=== 2019–present ===
In 2019, Rybak's children's musical Trolle og den magiske fela premiered in Kristiansand and received wide critical acclaim by reviewers. The show sold over 10,000 tickets and had to schedule extra performances to curb the demand. In 2020, Rybak co-wrote an entry for Melodi Grand Prix 2020 together with Jowst for singer Magnus Bokn called "Over the Sea". The song won the fourth semi-final of the selection show and proceeded to the final, where it eventually lost out to Ulrikke Brandstorp's "Attention".

Rybak was set to appear as part of an interval act at Eurovision 2020, which was later cancelled due to the COVID-19 pandemic. As a result of the contest cancellation, several countries organised a produced show or held a vote to determine their country's favourite Eurovision song of all times. Rybak's "Fairytale" finished 3rd in Wallonia's Votre top 20, 17th in the Netherlands's NPO Radio 2 Songfestival Top 50 list, and 6th in the United Kingdom's special Eurovision: Come Together show. "Fairytale" therefore re-entered the UK sales chart at #65 in late May 2020. A year prior, the Norwegians had voted "Fairytale" as their all-time favourite Eurovision song.

In August 2020, Rybak announced that he had enrolled in Columbia College Chicago for an MFA degree in film music composition. His interest in the field was solidified after the positive feedback he received from producers for "Into a Fantasy". He was convinced to attend Columbia by Kubilay Uner, director of the film music composition MFA program. He graduated from Columbia in July 2022.

Rybak performed at the final of Malta Eurovision Song Contest at the MFCC in February 2025.

In January 2026, it was announced that Rybak would be entering Melodi Grand Prix 2026 with the song "Rise". He finished as runner-up behind eventual winner Jonas Lovv.

In May 2026, Rybak was present at the final of the Eurovision Song Contest 2026; he performed as a part of the interval act, which included former participants performing a medley of past entries, to celebrate the contest's 70th anniversary.

== Artistry ==
=== Musical style and genres ===
About his own musical style, Rybak has said: "Generally, I do everything from writing folklore, children's music, DreamWorks songs to arranging for symphony orchestra and making cover versions of Eurovision songs. ... I do not make more albums, I like to publish one and a song on YouTube. It can be a classic piece, a pop song, a collaboration with Philip Cecil or just a cover song, but I will always have something visual to my songs, and maybe a music video."

=== Voice ===
Rybak is often classified as having a tenore di grazia voice. Rybak has also been noted multiple times for having a strong natural vibrato in his voice. His voice has been appreciated for creating whole and clear sounds.

== Personal life ==
Rybak was raised in the Christian Eastern Orthodox Church. In family circles and in his childhood, he used to be referred to as Sasha, the East Slavic diminutive for his first name. Rybak did not visit his country of birth for 17 years between his emigration to Norway and his first performance in Belarus in the summer of 2009. Though he grew up as an only child, Rybak revealed that he had a sister from whom he was estranged, from an earlier marriage of his father's. In 2012, Rybak met his half-sister for the first time in many years. Rybak bought a new apartment and lived at Aker Brygge (Oslo, Norway). Rybak speaks Norwegian, Russian, and English fluently, and has performed songs in all three languages. Rybak has also performed in Belarusian and, with Elisabeth Andreassen, in Swedish.

In 2010, Rybak was featured in the media negatively after a few incidents of uncontrolled anger. Both times, Rybak had a heated discussion with a sound technician. It resulted in Rybak breaking his fingers in May 2010, and during a later instance, also breaking his violin on stage. Rybak then said: "I never raised my voice before, and that's why I did what I did. I'm just a human being—and perhaps not the glossy image many believe. So it was good to get out frustrations so I could go on. It's only me that goes beyond the same." Rybak later blamed the behaviour on his hectic touring schedule, which led to him being overworked, also opening up about battling with depression due to his touring schedule, calling early 2011 the toughest moment of his life. He later stated he had to learn to say "no".

In August 2012 Rybak wrote on Twitter, "Since I was a little child, my biggest dream has been to perform at the Gay Pride Parade in Belgium. Tomorrow my biggest dream comes true."

In 2018 and 2019, Rybak struggled a lot with an unidentified illness, which led him to cancel several performances. To Ukrainian newspaper KP, Rybak said he was initially diagnosed with fatigue-related problems after his second Eurovision participation. In October 2019, Rybak declared he was hypochondriac, stating "all people above 20 have their own battle with something". Rybak stated working in a group for his children's musical Trolle og den magisken fela has helped him. For this production, he temporarily moved to the coastal city Kristiansand. In May 2020, Rybak revealed that he had been addicted to sleeping medications and antidepressants for 11 years, and had begun to recover after entering rehab in January.

Rybak began attending Columbia College Chicago virtually from his home in Norway in fall of 2020, and subsequently moved to Chicago to continue his studies in person by August 2021. He graduated from Columbia in July 2022 and lived in Los Angeles until 2024, when he moved back to Norway due to "a very persistent stalker" in the US.

== Discography ==
- Fairytales (2009)
- No Boundaries (2010)
- Visa vid vindens ängar (2011)
- Christmas Tales (2012)
- Trolle og den magiske fela (2015)
- Fairytales Too (2026)

== Filmography ==
Year	Film	Role	Notes
2009	Fairytale – The Movie	Himself	Documentary on Rybak after winning Eurovision
2009	Some Sunny Night - Live in Lillesand	Ketil Moe	Musical
2010	Yohan: The Child Wanderer	Levi	Film
2010	How to Train Your Dragon	Hiccup	Animated film (voice, Norwegian dub)
2014	How to Train Your Dragon 2	Hiccup	Animated film (voice, Norwegian dub)
2019	How to Train Your Dragon: The Hidden World	Hiccup	Animated film (voice, Norwegian dub)
2020	Eurovision Song Contest: The Story of Fire Saga	Himself	Film

NRK reported in January 2010 that he was also doing recording work to voice Hiccup in the Russian dub of How To Train Your Dragon; but in the released dub, Hiccup was instead voiced by Andrey Lyovin.

Awards and achievements
Preceded by (Russia) Dima Bilan with "Believe"	Winner of the Eurovision Song Contest; 2009	Succeeded by (Germany) Lena with "Satellite"
Preceded by Maria Haukaas Storeng with "Hold On Be Strong"	Norway in the Eurovision Song Contest; 2009	Succeeded by Didrik Solli-Tangen with "My Heart Is Yours"
Preceded by JOWST with "Grab the Moment"	Norway in the Eurovision Song Contest; 2018	Succeeded by KEiiNO with "Spirit in the Sky"
Preceded by Espen Lind	Recipient of the Spellemannprisen as Spellemann of the Year; 2009	Succeeded by Karpe Diem
