= How to Train Your Dragon 2 (soundtrack) =

2014 soundtrack album

Soundtrack album by John Powell
- Released: June 13, 2014; March 11, 2022 (deluxe edition)
- Recorded: 2012–2014
- Genre: Film score
- Length: 1:11:23; 1:48:41 (deluxe edition)
- Label: Relativity Music Group
- Producer: John Powell

John Powell chronology
Rio 2 (2014)	How to Train Your Dragon 2 (2014)	Pan (2015)

Singles from How to Train Your Dragon 2
- 1. "Into a Fantasy" Released: June 9, 2014

How to Train Your Dragon 2: Music from the Motion Picture is a soundtrack album to the 2014 film How to Train Your Dragon 2, and was released by Relativity Music Group on June 13, 2014. The film is a sequel to the 2010 film How to Train Your Dragon, which itself based on the British book series of the same name by Cressida Cowell, and is the second instalment in the How to Train Your Dragon film series. The score is composed by John Powell, who also scored for its predecessor. In addition to the original score featured, Powell also collaborated with Jónsi, to write two songs for the film, which were performed by Jónsi, Gerard Butler, Craig Ferguson and Mary Jane Wells, while a song "Into a Fantasy" performed by Alexander Rybak was released on June 9, and was included in the European version of the soundtrack. Much like the score of the first instalment, this score received critical acclaim praising Powell for his work in the film. A limited edition soundtrack was published by Varèse Sarabande label in May 2022. It featured previously unedited cues and demos from the compositions.

== Development ==
Powell described the project as "a maturation story," stating that he too tried to achieve the same maturation in the structure of his music by developing further every aspect of his compositions from the original film. By late-2012, Powell had begun writing music for the film and took eighteen months to complete. Recording took place during April 2014 at Abbey Road Studios in London with a 120-piece orchestra, a 100-voice choir, and a wide array of ethnic instruments, including celtic harp, uilleann bagpipes, tin whistle, bodhrán, and Highland bagpipes; the latter of which were performed by pipers from the Scottish group The Red Hot Chilli Pipers. The ensemble was conducted by the composer's usual collaborator Gavin Greenaway. After recording was done, Powell worked on the mixing, music editing, mastering and technical arrangements of the score material.

The main cue "Lost and Found" was one of the central themes Powell composed for the film. Some of the cues, including the score cues for Hiccup and Toothless flying, were integrated from the first film (e.g. "Test Drive"). All the score materials, for the preliminary characters were reused from its counterpart, for the introduction to its sequel for the first eight minutes. The use of Northern European instruments for the Vikings sequence was particularly notable. While some associate this scoring with a contextually-appropriate "viking music" genre, Powell stated in an interview to Time that "The way we associate certain sounds with cultures is a learned thing, and often it's not necessarily the truth. What we think of as Norse music and British Isle music, all these folk traditions are completely up for grabs. You have bagpipes in every part of the world. It's just a very common pipe."

Sigur Rós' lead vocalist, Jónsi, who wrote and performed the song "Sticks & Stones" for the first film, provided two new original songs for the sequel in collaboration with Powell: "For the Dancing and the Dreaming" (performed by Gerard Butler, Craig Ferguson & Mary Jane Wells) and "Where No One Goes" (performed by Jónsi himself). Belarusian-Norwegian artist Alexander Rybak, who voices Hiccup in the Norwegian dub of the film, also wrote and performed the song "Into a Fantasy". The latter song is featured only in the European versions of the film.

== Release ==
A soundtrack album for the film was released on June 13, 2014, by Relativity Music Group. The album features over an hour of score by Powell; with additional music by Anthony Willis and Paul Mounsey, as well as the two original songs written by Powell and Jónsi. Rybak's song "Into a Fantasy" was released separately as a single on June 9, before the album release. The vinyl edition of the soundtrack was released in August 2014. On March 11, 2022, a deluxe edition of the soundtrack was announced by Varèse Sarabande. It featured several of the unreleased and edited cues from the score material produced by John Powell, which were released into a two-disc set while also featuring previously edited demos as bonus tracks. The deluxe edition was released digitally on May 13, with a physical release is yet to be announced.

== Instrumentation ==
The soundtrack is scored for an exceptionally large orchestra, as follows:

Woodwinds: 4 flutes (3rd and 4th doubling both piccolos and alto flutes), 3 oboes, (3rd doubling cor anglais), 3 B♭ clarinets (1st and 2nd doubling A clarinets, 3rd doubling bass and contrabass clarinets), 3 bassoons (3rd doubling contrabassoon), Irish flute, penny whistle, tin whistle, 2 bagpipes, uilleann pipes

Brass: 9 F horns, 4 B♭ trumpets, 6 trombones (3rd and 6th double euphonium; 3rd, 4th, 5th, and 6th double bass trombone), 2 tubas (2nd doubling euphonium)

Percussion: Timpani, and 10 percussionists playing: dhol, shaker, gran cassa, tam-tams (high and low, then a third "large", or 80" one), gong, bell tree, mark tree, wind chimes, triangles (small and medium), hand bell, 2 snare drums, field snare drum, piccolo snare drum, mini snare drum, marching snare drum, bodhran, piatti (small, medium, large), suspended cymbals (small, regular, large), china cymbal, sizzle cymbal, chimes, glockenspiel, 5 tuned desk bells (G, B♭, C, D, F), 2 slate marimbas, glass marimba, wooden marimba, bass marimba, sleigh bells, surdo, breketes (small, wide, and large), 2 anvils, concert tom toms, pot log, tambourine, Verdi bass drum, garbage can, small ethnic cymbal, djun djun, taiko, small African drum, darbouka, temple block, balafon, agogo bells

Strings: 16 violins I & II, 14 violas, 12 cellos, 8 double basses, 2 harps (both doubling Celtic harp), mandolin, 3 dulcimers, guzheng

Keyboards: Piano, celesta, harmonium, kalimba

Electric instruments: 2 synthesisers ("sampled piano", "synth backing vocals", "Rev Piano FX", "Pulsing", "Shrieking Wail"), electric guitar, synth bass, electric drumset, electric frame drum

A large choir (SMzSATBarB) and vocal soloists are also required, with lower voices singing in falsetto in parts. In addition, some songs are sung by singer Jónsi and backing vocalists.

== Track listing ==
All music is composed by John Powell.

No.	Title	Length
1.	"Dragon Racing"	4:34
2.	"Together We Map the World"	2:19
3.	"Hiccup the Chief/Drago's Coming"	4:44
4.	"Toothless Lost"	3:28
5.	"Should I Know You?"	1:56
6.	"Valka's Dragon Sanctuary"	3:19
7.	"Losing Mom/Meet the Good Alpha"	3:24
8.	"Meet Drago"	4:26
9.	"Stoick Finds Beauty"	2:33
10.	"Flying with Mother"	2:49
11.	"For the Dancing and the Dreaming" (performed by Gerard Butler, Craig Ferguson & Mary Jane Wells)	3:06
12.	"Battle of the Bewilderbeast"	6:26
13.	"Hiccup Confronts Drago"	4:06
14.	"Stoick Saves Hiccup"	2:23
15.	"Stoick's Ship"	3:48
16.	"Alpha Comes to Berk"	2:20
17.	"Toothless Found"	3:46
18.	"Two New Alphas"	6:06
19.	"Where No One Goes" (performed by Jónsi)	2:44
20.	"Into a Fantasy" (performed by Alexander Rybak)	3:32

=== Deluxe edition ===
All music is composed by John Powell.

Disc 1
No.	Title	Length
1.	"Dragon Racing (1m1-INS) [Alternate Film Version]"	1:04
2.	"Dragon Racing (1m1) [Original Opening Version]"	4:40
3.	"Where No One Goes (1m2s)" (performed by Jónsi)	2:29
4.	"Together, We Map the World (1m3-4)"	2:32
5.	"Hiccup's Gonna Be Chief (1m5)"	3:20
6.	"Eret Educates Hiccup (1m6)"	1:45
7.	"Drago's Coming (2m7)"	1:54
8.	"Eret Has Visitors (2m8)"	1:03
9.	"Me Likey (2m9)"	1:03
10.	"War is What He Wants (2m10)"	1:53
11.	"Hiccup and Toothless Attacked (2m11)"	2:34
12.	"Dragon's Lair (2m12)"	1:34
13.	"Should I Know You? (2m13)"	1:57
14.	"Valka's Dragon Sanctuary (2m14)"	0:55
15.	"Hiccup & Valka Bond (2m15-16)"	2:31
16.	"Valka's Flash - Good Alpha (3m17-18)"	3:25
17.	"I Grew Facial Hair For You (3m19)"	1:20
18.	"Flying With Mother (3m20)"	2:50
19.	"Can We Start Over? (3m21)"	1:56
20.	"Meet Drago (3m22)"	4:28
21.	"Stoick Finds Beauty (3m25-26)"	2:43
22.	"Get 'Em You Son of An Eret (3m27)"	1:43
23.	"Courting Song (3m28s)" (performed by Gerard Butler, Craig Ferguson & Mary Jane Wells)	2:33
24.	"Courting Song Instrumental (4m29)"	0:54
25.	"Battle of the Bewilderbeast (4m30)"	6:29

All music is composed by John Powell.

Disc 2
No.	Title	Length
26.	"Hiccup Confronts Drago (4m31)"	4:09
27.	"Stoick Saves Hiccup (4m32)"	2:23
28.	"Off to Valhalla (4m33)"	3:47
29.	"Riding to Drago's (4m35)"	1:02
30.	"Alpha Comes to Berk (4m36-37)"	2:22
31.	"Toothless Comes Back (5m38)"	3:50
32.	"Challenging the Alpha (5m39a)"	3:00
33.	"The Chief Has Come Home (5m39b)"	3:26
34.	"Where No One Goes Reprise (5m40)"	3:52

All music is composed by John Powell.

Bonus tracks
No.	Title	Length
35.	"Dragon Racing (1m1) [DEMO]"	4:36
36.	"Together, We Map the World (1m3-4) [DEMO]"	2:37
37.	"Valka's Flash - Good Alpha (3m17-18) [DEMO]"	3:26
38.	"Flying with Mother (3m20) [DEMO]"	2:50
39.	"Off to Valhalla (4m33) [DEMO]"	3:51
40.	"Toothless Comes Back (5m38) [DEMO]"	3:55

== Reception ==
Zanobard Reviews assigned a score of 8/10, calling it "nothing short of magnificent". He further wrote "Powell took all the best thematic elements from his previous score and then expertly intertwined them with some pretty fantastic new ones, altogether making for a rather breathtaking and indeed highly enjoyable album." Movie Wave's James Southall wrote "How to Train Your Dragon 2 takes the first score, does all the good things it did, adds even more great ones. There's Wagnerian theatrics, genuine emotion, rousing action, thrilling adventure, an endless array of bright colours." City Newspaper's Matt DeTurck wrote "Composer John Powell's score to "How to Train Your Dragon 2" musically achieves what we hope from all sequels: incorporating established themes while expanding them with new elements that are just as strong. It's a delicate line to tread, but it's one that Powell faces with aplomb."

Renowned for Sound-based Marcus Floyd wrote "The soundtrack to How To Train Your Dragon 2 is a collection of unique tracks that would reign suitable for an action packed animated feature such as those in the How To Train Your Dragon trilogy; each piece obviously had a story to tell, as would each scene in the film and it would seem they would go hand in hand to deliver a strong impacting film." Jonathan Broxton of Movie Music UK wrote "if How to Train Your Dragon 2 is anything to go by, Powell is nowhere close to running out of ideas, or of falling out of love with the medium. This score is spectacular – by far the most enjoyable romp of 2014 to date; anyone who loved the first score in this series will surely have the same reaction here, and anyone who loves good, old-fashioned, proper orchestral music, written by a composer who knows what he's doing, performed by an ensemble of musicians at the top of their game, and containing an overwhelmingly positive sense of life, joy and enthusiasm will love it too."

== Release history ==
CD
Region	Date	Label	Version(s)	Ref.
United States	June 13, 2014	Relativity Music Group	RMG1067-1	
United Kingdom	June 16, 2014	Sony Classical	88843071602	
Europe	June 16, 2014	Sony Masterworks	88843071602	
Australia	June 20, 2014	Sony Music Australia	88843071602	

Vinyl
Region	Date	Label	Version(s)	Ref.
United States	August 4, 2014	Music on Vinyl	LP- 1196	
United Kingdom	August 4, 2014	Music on Vinyl	LP- 1196	
Europe	August 4, 2014	Music on Vinyl	LP- 1196	

Deluxe Edition
Region	Date	Label	Format	Version(s)	Ref.
United States	October 17, 2014	Relativity Music Group	Zinepak	RMG1068-1	
United States	May 13, 2022	Varèse Sarabande	3-disc edition	VSD00504 888072425378	
Canada	May 13, 2022	Varèse Sarabande	3-disc edition	VSD00504 888072425378	
Europe	May 13, 2022	Varèse Sarabande	3-disc edition	VSD00504 888072425378	

== Awards and nominations ==
Ceremony	Category	Recipient(s)	Result
Annie Awards	Music in a Feature Production	John Powell, Jónsi	Won
Saturn Awards	Saturn Award for Best Music	John Powell	Nominated
