= Rio 2 (soundtrack) =

Soundtrack album

Rio 2 (Music from the Motion Picture)

Soundtrack album by Various artists
- Released: March 25, 2014
- Genres: Pop; Latin; alternative hip hop
- Length: 39:07
- Labels: Atlantic; Fox Music
- Producers: Sérgio Mendes; John Powell

Singles from Rio 2 (Music from the Motion Picture)
- 1. "What Is Love" Released: March 4, 2014

Rio 2 (Music from the Motion Picture) is the soundtrack album to the film of the same name, the sequel to the 2011 film Rio, directed by Carlos Saldanha. Featuring contributions from Brazilian and American artists, the album is produced by the film's composer John Powell and Brazilian musician Sérgio Mendes. Like the first film, the soundtrack for the sequel also incorporates Brazilian music, while infusing pop, latin and hip hop genres into the album. It is preceded by the single "What is Love" performed by Janelle Monáe, that was released on March 4, 2014 and the album was released by Atlantic Records and Fox Music, on March 25. Rio 2 (Original Motion Picture Score) consisting the film's score by Powell, was released on April 15, 2014.

== Development ==
Like the first film's soundtrack, composer John Powell collaborated with Brazilian musician Sérgio Mendes, to produce the album, and also co-write the film's songs with Carlinhos Brown, who also worked in the predecessor. Brown and Mendes write rhythmic and melody songs, and once the song took shape, Powell would fine tune songs and score to fit together. Mendes wanted the music of the sequel to be different than its predecessor and to show the diversity of Brazilian music by bringing different textures and instruments.

According to Mendes, "the movie starts on New Year's Eve in Rio. It's a very celebratory and international and a great time to go to Brazil to experience that", hence he wanted to bring Janelle Monáe onboard as she had "a very unique voice and a young sound but has that international [appeal] as well". Mendes collaborated with Monáe at the Rock in Rio concert soon after the first film's release in 2011, and discussed about the film's music "When we spoke with Janelle we wanted a fun, festive song with a message of love and of hope. It had to convey the energy of Rio, something everyone could dance to, and when we heard it we could see it playing anywhere." For the song "O Vida", Mendes went to Brazil, and collaborated with Uakti for few songs, where they could bring their home-made instruments to Los Angeles, and Powell could incorporate the song through the soundtrack. He added "Carlos inspired all of us because the music follows the story. And also the music is mostly for children so it has to be simple and catchy with no complicated harmonically or melodically, but we want the parents to enjoy as well. But the visual part is so beautiful."

Carlos Saldanha, the film's director had said on Powell's contribution, adding "John is so curious, so passionate, that he immersed himself in Brazilian music. Every year we went to Brazil. He helped me shape the movie in a way that I would never have imagined. I have never seen somebody work so well and so collaboratively with such a diverse group of artists, from will.i.am and Janelle Monae to Sergio Mendes and Carlinhos Brown; he maneuvered through all those worlds." Danielle Diego, the executive vice president of Fox Music praised Powell's contribution and added that "the songs and score are seamlessly interwoven. It's a cohesive experience, and so sophisticated musically."

== Release ==
Atlantic Records announced the film's soundtrack on February 13, 2014, and it was released in digital formats on March 25. It was promoted by the single "What Is Love", performed by Janelle Monáe, released on March 4 as a music video in YouTube. The full song was released digitally on March 11. It was promoted at Fox's American Idol, NBC's Today and BET's 106 & Park, with Monáe appearing in the song for performance. The album was exclusively promoted at Billboard, which revealed the digital track list, a day before its release. The album was later released to physical formats on April 1. Barbatuques performed the song "Beautiful Creatures" as part of the closing ceremony of the 2016 Summer Olympics in Rio de Janeiro.

== Track listing ==
| No. | Title | Writer(s) | Performer(s) | Length |
|---|---|---|---|---|
| 1. | "What Is Love" | Janelle Monáe; Nate "Rocket" Wonder; Roman Irvin | Monáe | 3:31 |
| 2. | "Rio Rio" | Ester Dean; Bobby Ray Simmons Jr.; Mikkel Storleer Erikson; Tor Erik Hermansen | Dean; B.o.B | 2:41 |
| 3. | "Beautiful Creatures" | Andre Hosoi; Renato Epstein; Taura Stinson | Barbatuques; Andy García; Rita Moreno | 2:07 |
| 4. | "Welcome Back" | Bruno Mars; Philip Lawrence; John Powell | Bruno Mars | 1:08 |
| 5. | "Ô Vida" | Carlinhos Brown; Powell; Sergio Mendes; Stinson | Brown; Nina De Freitas | 1:47 |
| 6. | "It's a Jungle Out Here" (Brazilian version) | Lawrence; Jean Yves "Jeeve" Ducornet; Michael Diskint | Lawrence; Uakti | 3:59 |
| 7. | "Don't Go Away" | Flavia Maia; Stinson | Anne Hathaway; Flavia Maia; Uakti | 2:38 |
| 8. | "Batucada Familia" | Brown; Mendes; Powell; Siedah Garrett | Garrett; Jamie Foxx; Rachel Crow; Amy Heidemann; García; Moreno | 2:42 |
| 9. | "Poisonous Love" | Brown; Powell; Randy Rogel | Kristin Chenoweth; Jemaine Clement | 3:30 |
| 10. | "I Will Survive" | Dino Fekaris; Freddie Perren; Clement; Yoni Brenner | Clement; Chenoweth | 1:51 |
| 11. | "Bola Viva" | Brown; Powell; Mendes | Brown | 3:22 |
| 12. | "Favo De Mel" | Mendes; Brown; Mutti; Powell; Garrett | Milton Nascimento | 3:08 |
| 13. | "It's a Jungle Out Here" | Lawrence; Ducornet; Diskint | Lawrence | 4:00 |
| 14. | "What Is Love" | Monáe; Wonder; Irvin | Monáe; Hathaway; Jesse Eisenberg; Foxx; Brown | 2:43 |
| Total length: | | | | 39:07 |

== Reception ==
Filmtracks.com wrote "Powell's score once again shares melodic structures with the original songs, some of which cast ensemble pieces that Powell contributed to. Those songs are not included on the score-only album for Rio 2, which does, though, open with a samba rendition of the 20th Century Fox theme certain to keep Alfred Newman turning over in his grave. The score album features fewer of these truly intolerable comedic moments, making Rio 2 a more palatable overall experience apart from the film. Don't expect too much from the music in this franchise, however, especially if you're anything near Alfred Newman's generation." James Southall of Movie Wave wrote "The familiar, sweet main theme from the first film returns, as does the typical Powell orchestral derring-do, as he almost always uses in these animations. What's different is that there's a slightly higher emphasis this time on Brazilian rhythms, the composer employing the services of the native band Uakti, who inject a wonderful sense of fun and a great energy whenever they appear. There's a great set of themes here, too, memorable and magical, Powell throwing them around a huge number of variations over the course of the score. It's a lovely album – full of charm, wit, terrific orchestral music; a very pleasurable way of spending an hour. There's adventure in spades, moments of wit (I just love the woodwind impersonations of bird calls), an occasional bout of 60s-style “light music”; above all, just the most wonderful fun – music with a smile on its face whose infectious spirit quickly passes on to the listener."

James Christopher Monger of AllMusic said the soundtrack "offers up a predictably colorful set of originals and bossa nova-tinged Brazilian pop classics from a bevy of talented artists, and a star-studded cast of voice actors". Melissa Redman of Renowned for Sound wrote "The Rio 2 album is filled with vibrant, uplifting tracks as well as the sadder, softer songs that must come in any children's movie. The songs also take into account the fact that the movie is set is Rio de Janeiro/the Amazon rainforest and inject a bit of cultural flair into the tunes. The Rio 2 soundtrack and all the songs that come with it are perfect to accompany the Rio 2 film."

== Charts ==
| Chart (2014) | Peak position |
|---|---|
| UK Compilation Charts (OCC) | 39 |
| UK Soundtrack Albums (OCC) | 17 |
| US Billboard 200 | 124 |
| US R&B/Hip-Hop Albums (Billboard) | 19 |
| US Kid Albums (Billboard) | 23 |
| US Soundtracks (Billboard) | 4 |

== Personnel ==
Credits adapted from CD liner notes.

- Soundtrack producer – John Powell, Sergio Mendes
- Digital production – Beth Caucci, Victor Chaga
- Recording – "Big Juice" Delaine, Brad Haehnel, Janelle Monáe, Joe Fitz, John Traunwieser, Nate Wonder, Roman GianArthur, Erik Swanson, Kevin Globerman
- Mixing – "Big Juice" Delaine, Brad Haehnel, Joe Fitz, Robert Orton
- Mastering – Fernando Lee, Stephen Marsh
- Music editor – Tom Carlson
- Executive producer – Sergio Mendes
- Musical assistance – Andrew Jordan, Brandon Cudequest, John Aspinall, Michael Christofi, Michael Matthews, Michael Nisbet, Michael Srisuwan
- Vocals – Ayana Layli Williams, Baraka May Williams, Beth Andersen, Bill Cantos, Carla Rigolin Hassett, Carlinhos Brown, Clydene Jackson, Edie Lehmann-Boddicker, Eric Andrew Nicolau, Felipe Fraga, Fletcher Sheridan, Gracinha Leporace, Jessica Kahn Variba, Joe Pizzulo, Joseph Williams, Katie Hampton, Kleber Jorge, Kudisan Kai, Moma de Freitas, Monique Donnelly, Paul Mounsey, Randy Crenshaw, Raquel Jacobs, Renni Flores, Roberto Montero, Siedah Garrett, Suzanne Waters, Sergio Mendes, Taura Stinson, Taylor Graves

== Score album ==
Rio 2 (Original Motion Picture Score)

Film score by John Powell
- Released: April 15, 2014
- Recorded: 2013–2014
- Venues: Los Angeles, California
- Studios: Newman Scoring Stage, 20th Century Fox Studios; 5 Cat Studios
- Genre: Film score
- Length: 55:10
- Labels: Atlantic; Fox Music
- Producer: John Powell

John Powell chronology
| Ice Age: Continental Drift (2012) | Rio 2 (2014) | How to Train Your Dragon 2 (2014) |

An album featuring John Powell's original score was released on April 8, 2014 by Atlantic Records and Fox Music. The score was recorded at the Newman Scoring Stage, in 20th Century Fox, where the 108-piece ensemble from Hollywood Studio Symphony, performed the score, which was conducted by José Serebrier.

=== Track listing ===
| No. | Title | Length |
|---|---|---|
| 1. | "20th Century Fox Fanfare" (Rio 2 Samba Version) | 0:24 |
| 2. | "Batucada Pagode" | 1:35 |
| 3. | "Over the Falls" (Milton Nascimento) | 3:39 |
| 4. | "Breakfast in Rio" | 3:08 |
| 5. | "Fireworks on the Roof" (Uakti) | 1:27 |
| 6. | "Traveling Family" | 1:59 |
| 7. | "Sideshow Freaks" (Uakti) | 3:08 |
| 8. | "Stalking the Ferry" | 2:06 |
| 9. | "River Boat to the Loggers" (Carlinhos Brown and Uakti) | 2:59 |
| 10. | "Escorted to the Clan" (Uakti and Barbatuques) | 5:40 |
| 11. | "Up Carla's Monkey" (Uakti) | 2:15 |
| 12. | "Spider Invite" (Uakti and Barbatuques) | 2:46 |
| 13. | "Humans Are Longer Than They Told Me" (Uakti) | 2:23 |
| 14. | "Tongue-apult to Blu's Nightmare" | 2:08 |
| 15. | "Red Bullies" (Uakti) | 3:19 |
| 16. | "Tantrums Lead to Explosions" (Uakti) | 3:42 |
| 17. | "Lollipops are Bad for your Teeth" (Milton Nascimento, Uakti, and Barbatuques) | 3:55 |
| 18. | "Battle for the Heart of the Forest" | 4:45 |
| 19. | "Romeo and Juliet's Unfortunate Demise" (Uakti and Barbatuques) | 3:52 |
| Total length: | | 55:10 |

=== Personnel ===
Credits adapted from CD liner notes.

- Composer, producer – John Powell
- Recording – John Traunwieser, Brad Haehnel, Carlinhos Brown
- Mixing – John Traunwieser, Brad Haehnel
- Sound design – Carlinhos Brown
- Score editor – Whitney Martin, David Channing
- Additional music – Anthony Willis, Paul Mounsey
- Arrangements, programming – Anthony Willis, Paul Mounsey, Germaine Franco

Orchestra

- Orchestra – Hollywood Studio Symphony
- Orchestration – Andrew Kinney, Brad Dechter, Dave Metzger, Germaine Franco, Greg Jamrok, Jeff Atmajian, John Ashton Thomas, José Serebrier, Mark Graham, Nicholas Pike, Randy Kerber, Rick Giovinazzo, Victor Pesavento
- Concertmaster – Bruce Dukov
- Score conductor – José Serebrier
- Score contractor – Gina Zimmitti
- Assistant score contractor – Whitney Martin
- Choir (5 Cat Studios) – Baraka May Williams, Beth Anderson, Bill Cantos, Clydene Jackson, Edie Lehmann Boddicker, Elin Carlson, Fletcher Sheridan, Joseph Williams, Kudisan Kai, Monique Donnelly, Paul Mounsey, Randy Crenshaw, Suzanne Waters
- Choir (Barbatuques) – Arthur Andrés, Dani Zulu, Décio Ramos, Fernando Barba, Flavia Maia, Giba Alves, Helô Ribeiro, Marco Antônio, Paulo Santos, Renato Epstein
- Vocal conductor and contractor – Edie Lehmann-Boddicker
- Copyist – Joann Kane Music Service, Mark Graham

Instrument

- Accordion – Nick Ariondo
- Bass – Bruce Morgenthaler, Drew Dembowski, Ed Meares, Ian Walker, Mike Valerio, Oscar Hidalgo, Steve Dress, Sue Ranney
- Bassoon – Damian Montano, Ken Munday, Samantha Duckworth
- Cello – Tony Cooke, Armen Ksajikian, Cecilia Tsan, Dennis Karmazyn, Giovanna Clayton, Laszlo Mezo, Paul Cohen, Steve Erdody, Steve Richards, Tim Loo, Trevor Handy, Vanesa Freebairn Smith
- Clarinet – Dan Higgins, Greg Huckins, Ralph Williams
- Flute – Jenni Olson, Sara Weisz, Steve Kujala
- Flute – Pedro Eustache
- French Horn – Allen Fogle, Andrew Bain, Dan Kelley, Danielle Ondarza, Dylan Hart, Jim Thatcher, Jenny Kim, John Johnson, Mark Adams, Phil Yao, Steve Becknell, Dave Everson
- Guitar – George Doering, Kleber Jorge, Marcel Camargo, Roberto Montero
- Harp – Katie Kirkpatrick, Marcia Dickstein
- Oboe – Bernadette Avila, David Weiss, Lara Wickes
- Piano, celesta, harpsichord – Randy Kerber
- Percussion – Bernie Dresel, Bob Zimmitti, Brian Kilgore, Dan Greco, Don Williams, Germaine Franco, Wade Culbreath, Felipe Fraga, Leo Costa
- Trombone – Alex Iles, Phil Keen, Steve Holtman, Bill Booth, Garrett Smith
- Trumpet – Dan Fornero, Harry Kim, Jon Lewis, Rick Baptist
- Tuba – Doug Tornquist
- Viola – Alma Fernandez, Andrew Duckles, Brian Dembow, Carolyn Riley, Darrin McCann, David Walther, Keith Green, Matt Funes, Robert Brophy, Thomas Diener, Vicki Miskolczy
- Violin – Darius Campo, Eun Mee Ahn, Irina Voloshina, Jackie Brand, Joel Derouin, Josefina Vergara, Julie Gigante, Julie Rogers, Katia Popov, Kevin Connolly, Kevin Kumar, Lily Ho Chen, Marc Sazer, Natalie Leggett, Neel Hammond, Paul Henning, Phil Levy, Richard Altenbach, Roger Wilkie, Sara Parkins, Sarah Thornblade, Serena Mckinney, Songa Lee, Tammy Hatwan, Tereza Stanislav, Yelena Yegoryan

Management

- Executive producer (Twentieth Century Fox) – Danielle Diego
- Executive producer (Atlantic Records) – Kevin Weaver
- Soundtrack co-ordinator (Atlantic Records) – Joseph Khoury
- Business affairs administration (Atlantic Records) – Craig Rosen
- Business affairs (Twentieth Century Fox) – Tom Cavanaugh
- Legal affairs (Atlantic Records) – Marc Joaquin, Margo Scott
- Licensing (Atlantic Records) – Margo Scott
- Marketing (Atlantic Records) – Tony Corey
- Music clearance (Twentieth Century Fox) – Ellen Ginsburg
- Product management (Twentieth Century Fox) – Johnny Choi
- Music production supervisor (Twentieth Century Fox) – Rebecca Morellato
