= Ice Age: Continental Drift (soundtrack) =

Ice Age: Continental Drift (Original Motion Picture Soundtrack)

Film score by John Powell
- Released: July 10, 2012
- Recorded: 2012
- Studios: Newman Scoring Stage, 20th Century Fox Studios, Los Angeles; 5 Cat Studios, Los Angeles
- Genre: Film score
- Length: 57:57
- Labels: Varèse Sarabande; Fox Music
- Producer: John Powell

John Powell chronology
The Lorax (2012)	Ice Age: Continental Drift (2012)	Rio 2 (2014)

Ice Age: Continental Drift (Original Motion Picture Soundtrack) is the film score to the 2012 film Ice Age: Continental Drift, the fourth instalment in the Ice Age franchise and the sequel to Ice Age: Dawn of the Dinosaurs (2009). The film score is composed by John Powell and released through Varèse Sarabande and Fox Music on July 10, 2012.

== Background ==
John Powell, who previously composed the second and third installments, returned for Continental Drift. In addition to Powell's original score, the film features Beethoven's 9th Symphony. Powell explained his decision: "At the beginning of the film, the creation of the geographical world as we know it seemed just such an immense idea to musically convey, that I gave up entirely and used Beethoven's Ninth Symphony instead. With a bit of obscenely crass re-orchestration and blatantly cheap arranging tricks normally associated with strippers, we got it to fit the action perfectly. But the cost that I must now bear is having to live forever in hiding, since the 'Beethoven Society' issued a 'fatwa' on me."

Powell used twenty bass accordions for the score with the decision to mess with the pirate clichés. Instead of using the squeezeboxes, Powell decided to use a large group of accordions in place of trombones, to make it a frightening instrument. He added, "There were so many accordionists in one room that they had to close all the Italian restaurants in a fifty-mile radius. And they were all looking at each other like "Whoa, I thought I had this gig, who the hell are you!?" They hadn't played with any other accordionists since they were kids in Mrs. Henkel's 200-piece accordion orchestra."

== Release ==
The soundtrack album was released on July 10, 2012, by Varèse Sarabande.

== Reception ==
Filmtracks wrote "there's a point at which the composer's sense of humor in this kind of assignment ceases to appeal to anyone outside of his dedicated fanbase, and Ice Age: Continental Drift is straddling that line." Peter Debruge of Variety and Megan Lehmann of The Hollywood Reporter called the score "exciting" and "enjoyable".

== Track listing ==
No.	Title	Length
1.	"Morning Peaches"	2:22
2.	"Schism"	2:28
3.	"Storm"	3:50
4.	"No Exit Gutt"	5:37
5.	"Escape from Captivity"	3:02
6.	"New Loves"	4:50
7.	"Hydraxes / Prison Talk"	2:57
8.	"Diversion"	3:57
9.	"Pirating the Pirates"	4:37
10.	"Teen Cave"	4:42
11.	"Sirens"	2:35
12.	"Battle of Boston"	7:51
13.	"Herd Reunion"	3:08
14.	"Scrat's Fantasia on a Theme (LVB)^{[a]}"	5:30
Total length:		57:57

== Personnel ==
Credits adapted from liner notes:

- Music composer and producer – John Powell
- Additional music and arrangements – Beth Caucci, Hélène Muddiman, Paul Mounsey, Victor Chaga
- Engineer – Denis St. Amand
- Score recordist – Tim Lauber
- Digital recordist – Erik Swanson, Larry Mah
- Recording – Shawn Murphy, Rebecca Morellato, John Traunwieser, Marc Viner
- Mixing – Shawn Murphy
- Mixing assistance – John Traunwieser, Matt Ward
- Mastering – Patricia Sullivan
- Score editor – David Channing
- Music editor – Tom Carlson
- Music supervisor – Danielle Diego
- Musical assistance – John Chapman, Joshua Rutkowski
- Copyist – JoAnn Kane Music Service, Mark Graham
- Executive producer – Robert Townson
- Business affairs for 20th Century Fox – Tom Cavanaugh
- Executive in charge of music For 20th Century Fox – Robert Kraft

Orchestra

- Performer – Hollywood Studio Symphony
- Supervising orchestrator – John Ashton Thomas
- Orchestrators – Andrew Kinney, Brad Dechter, Dave Metzger, Germaine Franco, John Ashton Thomas, Pete Anthony, Randy Kerber, Rick Giovinazzo
- Conductor – Pete Anthony
- Contractor – Gina Zimmitti
- Concertmaster – Bruce Dukov
- Stage manager – Tom Steel
- Stage crew – Greg Dennen

Instruments

- Accordion – Michael Boddicker, Nick Ariondo, Adam Merrin, Beth Caucci, Brian Mann, Dart Zubis, Doug Lacy, Doug Petty, Ed Vodicka, Edie Lehmann Boddicker, Elizabeth Finch, Enrique Martinez, Gee Rabe, Germaine Franco, Joe Diamond, John Torcello, Joshua Kaufman, Michael Mollo, Mike Bolger, Norman Panto, Randy Kerber, Richard Feves, Suzie Katayama, Victor Chaga
- Banjo, guitar – George Doering
- Bass – Bruce Morgenthaler, Chris Kollgaard, Drew Dembowski, Mike Valerio, Oscar Hidalgo, Richard Feves, Sue Ranney, Ed Meares
- Bassoon – Damian Montano, John Mitchell, Judy Farmer, Rose Corrigan
- Cello – Andrew Shulman, Tony Cooke, Armen Ksajikian, Cecilia Tsan, Dennis Karmazyn, Kim Scholes, Giovanna Clayton, Laszlo Meza, Tim Landauer, Trevor Handy, Xiao-Dan Zheng, Steve Erdody
- Clarinet – Dan Higgins, Greg Huckins, Stuart Clark
- Flute – Jenni Olson, Pedro Eustache, Heather Clark
- French horn – Alan Fogle, Brad Warnaar, Dan Kelley, Dylan Hart, Jennie Kim, Joe Meyer, John Johnson, Laura Brenes, Mark Adams, Phil Yao, Steve Becknell, Jim Thatcher
- Harp – Katie Kirkpatrick, Marcia Dickstein
- Latin percussion – Luis Conte
- Oboe – Bernadette Avila, Leslie Reed, David Weiss
- Percussion – Bernie Dresel, Brian Kilgore, Dan Greco, Greg Goodall, Luis Conte, Wade Culbreath, Bob Zimmitti
- Piano – Randy Kerber
- Timpani – Don Williams
- Trombone – Alan Kaplan, Alex Iles, Bill Reichenbach, Phil Teele, Steve Holtman, Bill Booth, Charlie Loper
- Trumpet – Dan Fornero, Jon Lewis, Pete Desiena, Rick Baptist
- Tuba – Doug Tornquist
- Viola – Alma Fernandez, Andrew Duckles, Darrin McCann, David Walther, Keith Greene, Matt Funes, Robert Brophy, Roland Kato, Shawn Mann, Thomas Diener, Vickie Miskolczy, Brian Dembow
- Violin – Alyssa Park, Ana Landauer, Bruce Dukov, Carol Pool, Darius Campo, Eun-Mee Ahn, Grace Oh, Irina Voloshina, Jackie Brand, Joel Derouin, Josefina Vergara, Julie Gigante, Julie Rogers, Katia Popov, Lily Ho Chen, Maia Jasper, Marc Sazer, Natalie Leggett, Neel Hammond, Nina Evtuhov, Phil Levy, Richard Altenbach, Roberto Cani, Sara Parkins, Sarah Thornblade, Shalini Vijayan, Sid Page, Tereza Stanislav, Yelena Yergorian, Roger Wilkie

Choir

- Conductor and contractor – Edie Lehmann Boddicker
- Choir – Aleta Braxton-O'Brien, Alice Kirwan-Murray, Alvin Chea, Amy Fogerson, Angelique Lucia, Ayana Haviv, Baraka May Williams, Beth Andersen, Bob Joyce, Bobbi Page, Christen Herman, Christine Guter-Helferich, Christopher Gambol, Cindy Bourquin, Clydene Jackson, Daniel H. Korneychuk, David Loucks, Debbie Gleason, Richard Bolks, Dick Wells, Donna Medine, Edie Lehmann Boddicker, Elin Carlson, Elissa Johnston, Eric Bradley, Fletcher Sheridan, Greg Whipple, Guy Maeda, Harriet Fraser, Hélène Muddiman, Jasper Randall, Jennifer Barnes, Jenny Graham, Joan Beal, Joanna Bushnell, John Arthur West, Johnny Britt, Julie Minasian, Karen Whipple Schnurr, Kate Reid, Kathryn Bostic, Kimberly Switzer, Leanna Brand, Lesley Leighton, Luana Jackman, Luke Edgemon, Marc Antonio Pritchett, Michael Geiger, Michael Lichtenauer, Michael Redman Jr., Michele Hemmings, Missi Hale, Monica L. Lee, Monique Donnelly, Randy Crenshaw, Reid Bruton, Rick Logan, Roger Freeland, Sally Stevens, Sandie Hall, Scott Graff, Sean McDermott, Shawn Kirchner, Stephen Grimm, Steve Amerson, Steven Harms, Susie Stevens-Logan, Suzanne Waters, Teri Koide, Tim Davis, Vatsche Barsoumian, Virenia Lind, Walt Harrah

== Accolades ==
Awards	Category	Recipients	Result	Ref.
Annie Awards	Best Music in an Animated Feature Production	John Powell	Nominated	
ASCAP Film and Television Music Awards	Top Box Office Films	John Powell	Won	

== Notes ==
- ^{^a} Based on Themes from Symphony No. 9 by Ludwig van Beethoven
