= Kung Fu Panda 2 (soundtrack) =

2011 film soundtrack album

Kung Fu Panda 2 (Music from the Motion Picture)

Soundtrack album by Hans Zimmer and John Powell
- Released: May 24, 2011
- Recorded: 2011
- Studios: Abbey Road Studios; AIR Studios
- Genre: Film score
- Length: 64:26
- Label: Varèse Sarabande
- Producers: Hans Zimmer; John Powell

Hans Zimmer chronology
Pirates of the Caribbean: On Stranger Tides (2011)	Kung Fu Panda 2 (2011)	Sherlock Holmes: A Game of Shadows (2011)

John Powell chronology
Rio (2011)	Kung Fu Panda 2 (2011)	Happy Feet Two (2011)

Kung Fu Panda 2 (Music from the Motion Picture) is the soundtrack to the film Kung Fu Panda 2, directed by Jennifer Yuh Nelson, a sequel to Kung Fu Panda (2008). The film is composed by Hans Zimmer and John Powell, who also scored for the predecessor and had incorporated themes from the first film by adding more Chinese flavor for the score. The soundtrack was released by Varèse Sarabande on May 24, 2011, two days before the film's release.

== Reception ==
James Christopher Monger of AllMusic wrote "listeners who enjoyed the initial blend of swashbuckling, martial arts-inspired adventure themes and lush, pastoral interludes won't come away disappointed, as the two styles are well represented here." Filmtracks.com wrote "Those fans have often considered Kung Fu Panda to exceed its three-star rating at Filmtracks, and with the aforementioned improvements to its sound, Kung Fu Panda 2 successfully transcends to achieve that fourth star." James Southall of Movie Wave wrote "The themes of the first score all make a welcome return and there are times, in fact, that it can be hard to remember that you're not actually listening to that first score, so similar they are. Where they differ is that this one has more in the way of action music – a plus, since it's done so well – but slightly less in the way of the kind of heavenly music which was the highlight of the earlier score." Todd McCarthy of The Hollywood Reporter complimented Zimmer's score as an "energetic plus" and praised the "wittily ever-accelerating music" in the end credits. The New York Times critic A. O. Scott commented "Hans Zimmer's score is a witty pastiche that includes some choice '70s-style chopsocky riffs as well as more stately pseudoclassical swatches." Angie Errigo of Empire and Peter Debruge of Variety called it as a "standout" and "bombastic ".

== Track listing ==
No.	Title	Length
1.	"Ancient China / Story of Shen"	2:43
2.	"Dumpling Warrior"	1:19
3.	"Inner Peace"	2:26
4.	"Musicians Village"	1:20
5.	"Save Kung Fu"	3:41
6.	"Daddy Issues"	4:22
7.	"Stealth Mode"	4:04
8.	"Gongmen Jail"	2:40
9.	"Rickshaw Chase"	2:36
10.	"Po and Shen / Face to Face"	5:58
11.	"More Cannons!"	3:00
12.	"Fireworks Factory"	6:49
13.	"Po Finds the Truth"	5:04
14.	"Invasion Begins"	2:37
15.	"Zen Ball Master"	7:21
16.	"My Fist Hungers For Justice"	4:55
17.	"Dumpling Warrior Remix"	3:31
Total length:		64:26

== Accolades ==
Accolades received by Kung Fu Panda 2
Award	Category	Recipient(s)	Result	Ref.
ASCAP Award	Top Box Office Films	Hans Zimmer and John Powell	Won	
International Film Music Critics Association	Best Original Score for an Animated Film	Hans Zimmer and John Powell	Nominated	
World Soundtrack Awards	Soundtrack Composer of the Year	Hans Zimmer (Note: Also for Inception, How Do You Know, Megamind, Pirates of the Caribbean: On Stranger Tides, The Dilemma and Rango)	Nominated	
World Soundtrack Awards	Soundtrack Composer of the Year	John Powell (Note: Also for Mars Needs Moms and Rio)	Nominated	

== Personnel ==
Credits adapted from CD liner notes.

- Music composer, producer – Hans Zimmer, John Powell
- Additional music – Dominic Lewis, Lorne Balfe, Paul Mounsey
- Recording – Nick Wollage, Sam OKell
- Mixing – Alan Meyerson
- Mixing assistance – Greg Vines
- Mastering – Bernie Grundman
- Music editor – Adam Smalley
- Additional music editor – Peter "Oso" Snell, Slamm Andrews
- Score editor – David Channing
- Technical engineer – Andrew Kawczynski, Chuck Choi, John Traunwieser, Thomas Broderick, Victor Chaga
- Assistant engineer – Adam Miller, Ben Robinson, Christian Wenger, John Barrett, Olga Fitzroy, Pete Hutchings, Tom Bailey
- Score co-ordinator – Andrew Zack
- Music librarian – Dave Hage, Jill Streater
- Music clearance – Julie Butchko
- Additional overdub production – Germaine Franco
- Additional production services – Steve Kofsky
- Executive producer – Robert Townson

Orchestra and choir

- Conductor – Gavin Greenaway
- Orchestra contractor – Isobel Griffiths
- Assistant orchestra contractor – Lucy Whalley
- Orchestra leader – Emlyn Singleton
- Supervising orchestration – John Ashton Thomas
- Additional orchestration – Andrew Kinney, Dave Metzger, Gavin Greenaway, Germaine Franco, Rick Giovinazzo, Tommy Laurence
- Choir – Metro Voices
- Choirmaster – Jenny O'Grady

Instruments

- Cello – Anthony Pleeth
- Erhu – Hua Qi
- Percussion – Frank Ricotti, Gary Kettel, Ian Thomas, Paul Clarvis, Stephen Henderson, Bill Lockhart
- Remix – Tom Holkenborg
- Timpani – Michael Baker
