= Happy Feet Two (soundtrack) =

Happy Feet Two: Original Motion Picture Soundtrack

Soundtrack album by John Powell
- Released: November 15, 2011 (iTunes); November 21, 2011 (CD)
- Recorded: 2011
- Genres: Film score; soundtrack
- Length: 73:00
- Labels: Atlantic; WaterTower Music
- Producer: John Powell

John Powell chronology
Kung Fu Panda 2 (2011)	Happy Feet Two (2011)	The Lorax (2012)

Singles from Happy Feet Two
- 1. "Bridge of Light" Released: December 2, 2011

Happy Feet Two (Original Motion Picture Soundtrack) is the soundtrack to the 2011 film Happy Feet Two, directed by George Miller and a sequel to Happy Feet (2006). It features a collection of songs ranging from various genres—rock, pop, hip hop, rhythm and blues—performed by the cast and an original score composed by John Powell. Unlike the predecessor, the score and the songs were released in a single album by Atlantic Records and WaterTower Music in ITunes on November 15, 2011, which would be followed by a CD release six days later. The deluxe edition of the album contains an addition of 5 songs performed by Ozomatli, released on November 30.

== Track listing ==
All tracks composed by John Powell, except where noted.

Happy Feet Two (Original Motion Picture Soundtrack)
No.	Title	Writer(s)	Artist(s)	Length
1.	"Happy Feet Two Opening Medley"	Various	P!nk; Common; Benjamin "Lil' P-Nut" Flores Jr.; Chorus	4:11
2.	"The Mighty Sven"	John Powell; George Miller; T Bone Burnett	Robin Williams; Hank Azaria; Chorus	4:08
3.	"Bridge Of Light"	P!nk; Billy Mann	P!nk; Chorus	4:05
4.	"Papa-Oom-Mow-Mow"	Carl White; Al Frazier; Sonny Harris; Turner Wilson Jr.	Chorus	1:49
5.	"Dragostea Din Tei" (Romanian: "Love from the linden tree")	Dan Bălan; Manör Sevan	Hank Azaria; Chorus	1:29
6.	"Erik's Opera"	A. Miller; G. Miller; W. Miller	Omar Crook; E. G. Daily	2:25
7.	"Rawhide"	Dimitri Tiomkin; Ned Washington	Elephant Seal Chorus	1:14
8.	"Under Pressure / Rhythm Nation"	Roger Taylor; Freddie Mercury; David Bowie; John Deacon; Brian May / Janet Jackson; James Harris III; Terry Lewis	P!nk; Chorus	3:09
9.	"Tightrope" (Ice Cold Mix)	Nathaniel Irvin III; Charles Joseph II; Antwan Patton; Janelle Monáe	Janelle Monáe; Benjamin "Lil' P-Nut" Flores Jr.; Chorus	3:15
10.	"In the Hole"		John Powell	2:45
11.	"Ramon and the Krill"		John Powell	4:07
12.	"Lovelace Preshow"		John Powell; Judith Hill	2:05
13.	"Searching for the Kids"		John Powell	1:28
14.	"The Doomberg Lands"		John Powell	3:29
15.	"I Don't Back Up..."		John Powell	3:57
16.	"Trapped In Emperor Land"		John Powell	3:55
17.	"Skua Attack/Adelie Rescue"		John Powell	4:16
18.	"Dinna A La Sven"		John Powell	3:33
19.	"We Are the Champions"	Freddie Mercury	John Powell	2:42
20.	"Snow Stops Play"		John Powell; Steven Pence	2:01
21.	"No Fly Zone"		John Powell	3:36
22.	"Krill Joy"		John Powell	2:58
23.	"Tappin' to Freedom"		John Powell	5:54
Total length:				72:31

Happy Feet Two (Original Motion Picture Soundtrack) — Deluxe edition
No.	Title	Artist(s)	Length
24.	"Get On the Dance Floor"	Ozomatli	2:56
25.	"Flip Flap"	Ozomatli	2:01
26.	"Go Crazy"	Ozomatli	2:57
27.	"Your Hand In Mine"	Ozomatli	2:24
28.	"Do Your Thing"	Ozomatli	3:00
Total length:			85:49

== Reception ==
James Christopher Monger of AllMusic commented that the album "sports an even mix of upbeat dance, rock, and pop cuts and orchestral work from composer John Powell". Filmtracks.com wrote "There is less uniquely interesting activity here than in Kung Fu Panda 2 from earlier in the same year, and the listening experience on album will be a challenge for some enthusiasts of the composer because of the intrusion of source applications (like "We Are the Champions") directly into the score. Such fans will find five to ten minutes of worthy new music to add to their playlists from the original Happy Feet score, but don't expect much more. Meanwhile, aside from some funny treatment of a Dmitri Tiomkin standard, the songs clustered with the score this time tell you all you need to know about why the movie failed at the box office."

== Charts ==
Chart	Peak
Australian ARIA Albums Chart	70
US Top Soundtracks (Billboard)	22

== Personnel ==
- Music – John Powell
- Additional music, arrangements, programming and orchestration – Helene Muddiman, Paul Mounsey
- Producer – Billy Mann, Chuck Lightning, David Hirschfelder, Janelle Monáe, John Powell, Nate "Rocket" Wonder, T Bone Burnett, Wade Robson
- Recording – Shawn Murphy
- Additional recording – Hugo Nicolson, Marc Viner
- Mixing – Matt Ward, Shawn Murphy
- Assistant mixing – John Traunwieser
- Mastering – Patricia Sullivan Fourstar
- Music editor – Tom Carlson
- Score editor – David Channing
- Executive producer – Bill Miller, Doug Mitchell, George Miller, John Powell
- Music contractor – Gina Zimmitti
- Assistant contractor – Whitney Martin
- Album co-ordinator – Kari Miazek
- Stage manager – Elaine Beckett, Jamie Olivera
- Art direction – Sandeep Sriram

Instruments

- Accordion – Nick Ariondo
- Bass – Gus Seyffert
- Drums – Joey Waronker
- Guitar – Damian De Boos-Smith, George Doering, Michael Ripoll
- Keyboards – Doug Petty
- Percussion – Brian Kilgore, Luis Conte, Walter Rodriguez
- Saxophone – George Shelby, Scott Mayo
- Trumpet, trombone – Harry Kim, Steve Baxter

Orchestra

- Orchestra – Sydney Scoring Orchestra
- Orchestrated By – Angus O'Sullivan, Daniel Baker, Dave Metzger, Geri Green, Germaine Franco, James K. Lee, Jessica Wells, John Ashton Thomas
- Conductor – Brett Kelly
- Additional conductor – Brett Weymark, Dan Walker
- Contractor – Alex Henery
- Concertmistress – Fiona Ziegler, Sun Yi

Choir

- Choir – Cantillation Choir, Sydney University Graduate Choir
- Vocal arrangements – Carmen Twillie, Edie Lehmann Boddicker, John Powell, Beth Caucci, David Hirschfelder, Michael Mollo, Victor Chaga
- Vocal programming – Beth Caucci, David Hirschfelder, Michael Mollo, Victor Chaga
- Vocals recording – Butch Walker, Jason Wormer, Jesse Nichols, Sal Ojeda
- Vocal contractor – Edie Lehmann Boddicker

Source: AllMusic.
