= Leave Me Alone (Alexander Rybak song) =

Single by Alexander Rybak
- Released: 12 October 2012
- Recorded: 2012
- Genre: Pop, folktronica, dance-pop
- Length: 3:26
- Label: Eccentric Music
- Songwriter(s): Alexander Rybak

Alexander Rybak singles chronology
"I'll Show You" (2012)	"Leave Me Alone" (2012)	"Into a Fantasy" (2014)

"Leave Me Alone" is a song performed and written by Belarusian-Norwegian singer–songwriter Alexander Rybak. It was released as a digital download in Norway on 12 October 2012, and charted in Belgium.

== Background ==
Talking about the song Alexander Rybak said: "It's a true story of a woman who traveled around the world to babysit by my doorstep, sent me 600 emails, and always seems to find my new (secret!) phone number. I have to give her credit for her hard work in finding me wherever I am. This is something you normally only see in a movie. "

== Live performances ==
Rybak performed a live version of "Leave Me Alone" in Belgium on 5 November 2012 during an episode of the television show Manneke Paul, hosted by Dutch television presenter Paul de Leeuw.

== Controversy ==
The song and the accompanying music video led to controversy in Norway. A Norwegian psychologist said that it was a case for the police, not for the charts. The song was therefore subsequently parodied on the Norwegian television show Torsdagkveld fra Nydalen.

== Music video ==
A music video to accompany the release of "Leave Me Alone" was first released onto YouTube on 23 October 2012 at a total length of three minutes and thirty-five seconds. The video was directed by Alexander Filatovich in Kyiv.

The start of the video has Rybak running through a street, stopping at the doors of the asylum during a thunderstorm, as the doors open he states that "he wants to be admitted" as a crazy girl has been following him, then Alexander admits himself into the asylum as the orderlies then grab him, he's placed into a straight-jacket and placed in a rundown corridor as he then is shown playing is violin with the inmates seeing what's going on, only for the orderlies to place him into his room and onto the bed. As we then have shots of Rybak playing his violin with the inmates dancing inside a lounge room, with the stalker holding a teddy bear now as she watches him perform. The final shots show the stalker's tied up as she gives an evil smile, Alexander picking the teddy bear up and placing it on a stool with Alexander wearing the clothes from the start of the video fixing his jacket up as the stalker watches him leave as Alexander then leaves the asylum for good leaving the stalker where she belongs within the asylum.

As of July 2020, the music video has been watched over 11 million times. Its Russian version, Dostala, had been watched over 6 million times.

== Track listings ==
Digital download
No.	Title	Writer(s)	Length
1.	"Leave Me Alone"	Rybak; Eriksen	3:26

== Charts ==
Chart (2012)	Peak position
Belgium (Ultratip Bubbling Under Flanders)	80

== Release history ==
Region	Date	Format	Label
Norway	12 October 2012	Digital download	Eccentric Music
