= The Lorax (soundtrack) =

2012 albums

Dr. Seuss' The Lorax: Original Songs from the Motion Picture and Dr. Seuss' The Lorax: Original Motion Picture Score are the albums released for the 2012 animated musical film The Lorax (2012), (Note: Also known as Dr. Seuss' The Lorax.) based on Dr. Seuss' children's book of the same name, following the 1972 animated television special. The first album consisted of several original songs written for the film, released on February 21, 2012 by Interscope Records. The second album consisted of original score composed by John Powell and released on February 28 by Back Lot Music.

== Dr. Seuss' The Lorax: Original Songs from the Motion Picture ==
Dr. Seuss' The Lorax: Original Songs from the Motion Picture

Soundtrack album by John Powell and Cinco Paul
- Released: February 21, 2012
- Genre: Film soundtrack
- Length: 34:00
- Label: Interscope
- Producers: John Powell; Cinco Paul; Tricky Stewart (executive producer)

=== Background ===
Besides composing the film score, John Powell composed and wrote the original tracks with Cinco Paul, one of the film's screenwriters. Tricky Stewart served as the executive producer for the soundtrack. The producer Chris Meledandri, revealed that the inspiration of using songs, came directly from Dr. Seuss, as the animated version of The Grinch – embraced the use of songs in an unconventional way. He further revealed this in an interview to Collider:

"The use of music, in this film, is very unconventional, which I love. When you listen to the music in this film, it's working on the level of melody, but the other key element is lyrics. There are a number of songs in the film where the lyrics themselves are very much speaking to the essence of what Ted Geisel was setting out to do. Songs give you incredible opportunity to convey a tremendous amount in a relatively short period of time".

The lead single from the film, titled "Let It Grow" was sung by Ester Dean. Stewart wanted Dean to rope her for the song, as "from a subject matter standpoint, the song would be something that she would want to be involved with. Because of the message in The Lorax and the type of person that Ester is, those are the type of things that really mean something to her". He further stated about the song: "The song was a light-hearted version of what the film is about. But at the same time there is a seriousness to the message of the record. We take all those things into consideration: getting that message out there of what is going on in the environment, and not only what's going on in the environment, but what's going on with us as people. And I think that she was able to lyrically nail that soft spot in people, to tug on their heart strings a little bit, to make people walk out and maybe think about doing something nice, or think about doing something different than what they do on a daily basis. Just to do something good for the environment and good for your fellow person".

=== Reception ===
Critical reception to the soundtrack was mixed. Film critic A. O. Scott of The New York Times said that the film's silliness is "loud and slightly hysterical, as if young viewers could be entertained only by a ceaseless barrage of sensory stimulus and pop-culture attitude, or instructed by songs that make the collected works of Up With People sound like Metallica". The Hollywood Reporter critics felt that the songs "did not quite hit the desired chord".

In contrast, Variety's Justin Chang opined that the songs "are genial and loopy enough to give the film something of a Seussical sensibility". James Christopher Monger of AllMusic wrote: "The main songs, "Let It Grow", "Everybody Needs a Thneed", and "Thneedville", like the film itself, are subversive and silly, incorporating dance, pop, and rock elements while maintaining the general weirdness of a tree-hugging, mustachioed monster helping a 12-year-old boy land the girl of his dreams, but they could have easily been integrated into the orchestral version of the soundtrack".

=== Track listing ===
All lyrics are written by Cinco Paul; all music is composed by John Powell.

No.	Title	Performer(s)	Length
1.	"Let It Grow (Celebrate the World)" (co-written by Ester Dean, Tricky Stewart, and Aaron Pearce)	Ester Dean	3:39
2.	"Thneedville"	Fletcher Sheridan, Antonio Sol, Beth Anderson, Oliver Powell, Edie Lehmann Boddicker, Missi Hale, Rob Riggle & Choir	2:44
3.	"This is the Place"	Ed Helms & Choir	2:24
4.	"Everybody Needs a Thneed"	Ed Helms, Randy Crenshaw, Fletcher Sheridan, Edie Lehmann Boddicker, Monique Donnelly, Ty Taylor, The 88 & Choir	1:31
5.	"How Bad Can I Be?" (music co-written by Kool Kojak)	Ed Helms and Kool Kojak	2:52
6.	"Let It Grow"	Fletcher Sheridan, Dan Navarro, Edie Lehmann Boddicker, Jenny Slate, Claira Titman, Betty White, Rob Riggle, Ed Helms & Choir	3:17
7.	"Let It Grow Gospel Ending (Original Demo)"	Jenny Slate	0:52
8.	"Thneedville (Original Demo)"	Fletcher Sheridan	3:58
9.	"The Once-ler's Traveling Madness (Original Demo)"	Ed Helms	1:35
10.	"I Love Nature (Original Demo)"	Randy Crenshaw	2:43
11.	"You Need a Thneed (Original Demo)"	Keith Slettedahl and The 88 featuring Antonio Sol, Fletcher Sheridan, and Taylor Graves	1:32
12.	"Nobody Needs a Thneed (Original Demo)"	Fletcher Sheridan and Randy Crenshaw	1:52
13.	"Biggering (Original Demo)"	Gabriel Mann, Randy Crenshaw, and The 88	5:01
Total length:			34:00

=== Charts ===
Chart (2018)	Peak position
US Soundtrack Albums (Billboard)	24

=== Awards and nominations ===
Award	Category	Recipients	Result
Annie Awards	Music in an Animated Feature Production	John Powell, Cinco Paul	Nominated
ASCAP Awards	Top Box Office Films	John Powell, Cinco Paul	Won

== Dr. Seuss' The Lorax: Original Motion Picture Score ==
Dr. Seuss' The Lorax: Original Motion Picture Score

Film score by John Powell
- Released: February 28, 2012
- Recorded: 2011
- Genre: Film score
- Length: 45:51
- Label: Back Lot Music
- Producer: John Powell

John Powell chronology
Happy Feet Two (2011)	Dr. Seuss' The Lorax: Original Motion Picture Score (2012)	Ice Age: Continental Drift (2012)

John Powell composed the musical score for the film, after he previously scored the animated Seuss adaptation of Horton Hears a Who! (2008) produced by Blue Sky Studios. The score was released by Back Lot Music on February 28, 2012.

=== Reception ===
James Christopher Monger of Allmusic wrote: "Powell's deft blend of old-school orchestral grandeur and modern bombast yields some splendid fruit here, channeling the whimsy of Randy Newman, the joy of Alan Silvestri, and the mad fancy of Danny Elfman without ever breaking a sweat". Filmtracks.com wrote: "A strong balance of action, fantasy, and tragedy is conveyed by Powell in this score, though its tone is really too disparate from that of the songs to form a truly cohesive whole [...] The score-only product, on the other hand, is a decent listening experience and has roughly fifteen minutes of music that will fit nicely with Powell's similarly friendly but somewhat forgettable children's writing. If you are stuck watching the film, at least you will hear the debut of Brian Tyler's reworking of Jerry Goldsmith's Universal logo music at the outset, arguably a more interesting attraction than what follows".

=== Track listing ===
No.	Title	Length
1.	"Ted, Audrey and the Trees"	2:36
2.	"Granny to the Edge"	2:33
3.	"Wasteland"	2:17
4.	"Truffula Valley Fantasy (featuring The Lorax Humming Fish)"	5:00
5.	"Once-ler & Lorax Meet"	2:35
6.	"O'Hare Warns Ted"	3:21
7.	"The River Bed"	4:03
8.	"Houseguests"	3:12
9.	"Valley Exodus"	4:54
10.	"The Last Seed"	4:54
11.	"Thneedville Chase"	5:04
12.	"At the Park"	3:12
13.	"Funeral For a Tree"	2:10
Total length:		45:51

=== Awards and nominations ===
Award	Category	Recipients	Result
Ivor Novello Awards	Best Original Film Score	John Powell	Nominated
