= Into a Fantasy =

Single by Alexander Rybak

from the album How to Train Your Dragon 2 soundtrack
- Released: 12 June 2014
- Recorded: 2013
- Genre: Pop
- Length: 3:34
- Label: Alexander Rybak AS
- Songwriter: Alexander Rybak
- Producers: Knut Bjørnar Asphol, Alexander Rybak

Alexander Rybak singles chronology
"Leave Me Alone" (2012)	"Into a Fantasy" (2014)	"Typisk norsk" (2015)

"Into a Fantasy" is a song by Norwegian singer-songwriter Alexander Rybak. It was released on 12 June 2014 as a digital download in Norway. The song features on the How to Train Your Dragon 2 soundtrack, though it only appears in the European versions of the film. The song was written by Alexander Rybak and produced by Knut Bjørnar Asphol.

== Background ==
Alexander Rybak lend his voice to the main character Hiccup in the Norwegian dub of the How To Train Your Dragon franchise. He wrote a song titled "Come Fly with Me" during a difficult period in his life and decided he wanted to include in the song book Trolle og den magiske fela on which he was also working then. During the dubbing of the second film, Rybak noticed that his newly written song fit the storyline.

After a Norwegian director at DreamWorks heard the song, Rybak was encouraged to send the song to the headquarters of Dreamworks. Although the soundtrack of How To Train Your Dragon 2 had already been finalised at that stage, the company was fond of the song and decided to include it as a bonus track in the European and Slavic versions of the soundtrack. In these countries, the song, which title had been changed to "Into a Fantasy", was also played during the end credits.

== Critical reception ==
VG gave Rybak a "die throw" of 4 for "Into a Fantasy". Synchrotones called it a "lovely song with a folksy sound", but critiqued that it was lacking energy.

== Live performances ==
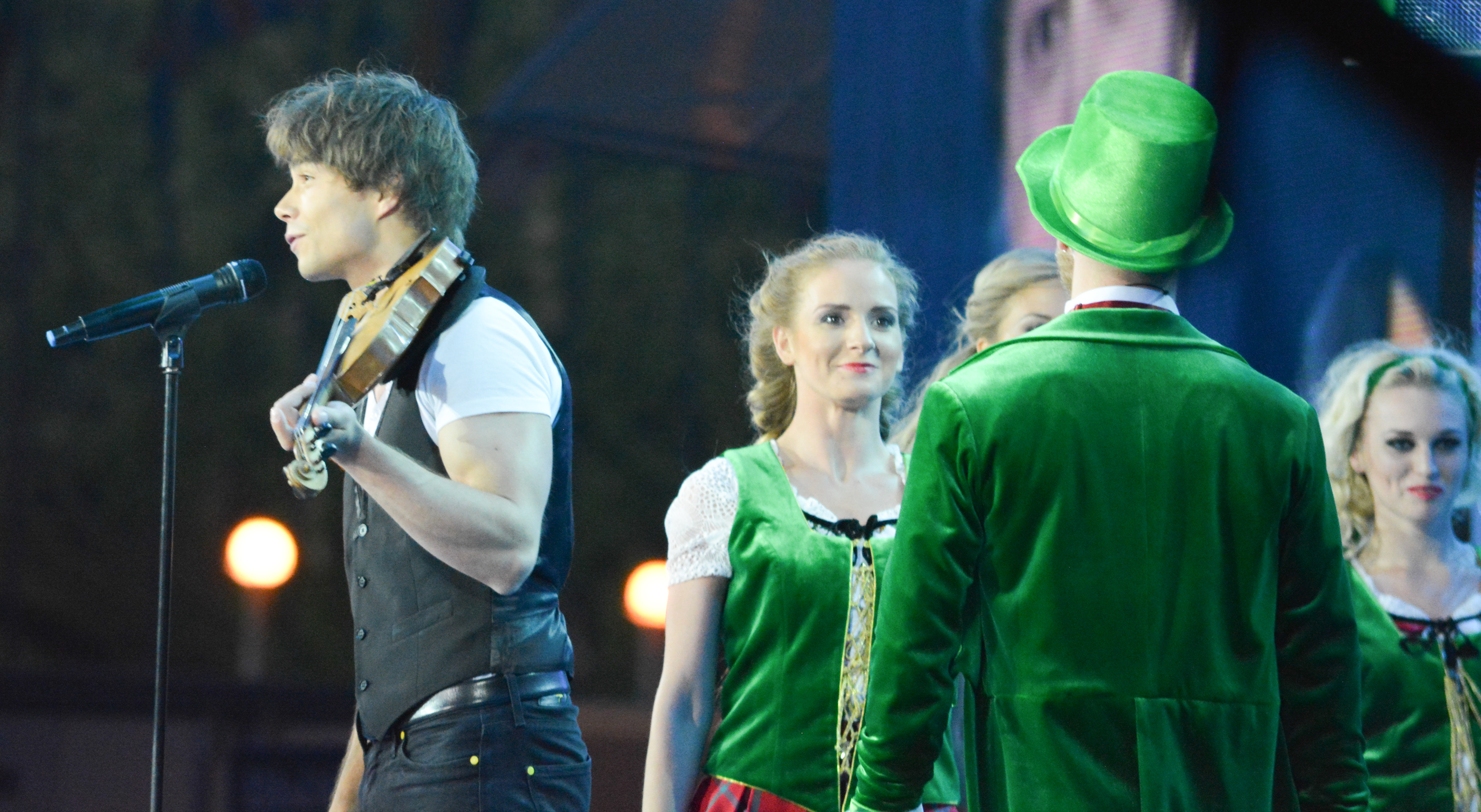
Alexander Rybak performing "Into a Fantasy" in Belarus.

Rybak officially premiered the track in Kyiv, Ukraine and also performed it during the Opening Ceremony of the Slavianski Bazaar in Vitebsk, Belarus in July 2014.

On 7 August 2014, Rybak performed "Into a Fantasy" during the Norwegian television show Allsang på Grensen, which he co-hosted that episode. In Sweden, Rybak debuted the song in the morning programme Nyhetsmorgen on 10 August, where he also performed songs from his album Visa vid vindens ängar.

== Music video ==
A music video to accompany the release of "Into a Fantasy" was first released onto YouTube on 17 June 2014 at a total length of three minutes and thirty-two seconds.

== Track listing ==
Digital download
No.	Title	Writer(s)	Length
1.	"Into a Fantasy" (From "How to Train Your Dragon 2")	Rybak	3:34

== Release history ==
Region	Date	Format	Label
Norway	12 June 2014	Digital download	Alexander Rybak AS
