= How to Train Your Dragon 2 =

2014 film by Dean DeBlois

- Theatrical release poster
- Directed by: Dean DeBlois
- Written by: Dean DeBlois
- Based on: How to Train Your Dragon by Cressida Cowell
- Produced by: Bonnie Arnold
- Starring: Jay Baruchel; Cate Blanchett; Gerard Butler; Craig Ferguson; America Ferrera; Jonah Hill; Christopher Mintz-Plasse; T.J. Miller; Kristen Wiig; Djimon Hounsou; Kit Harington
- Edited by: John K. Carr
- Music by: John Powell
- Production company: DreamWorks Animation
- Distributed by: 20th Century Fox (Note: In 2018, the film's distribution rights were transferred from 20th Century Fox to Universal Pictures, following NBCUniversal's acquisition of DreamWorks Animation in 2016.)
- Release dates: May 20, 2014 (Cannes); June 13, 2014 (United States)
- Running time: 102 minutes
- Country: United States
- Language: English
- Budget: $145 million
- Box office: $622 million

How to Train Your Dragon 2 is a 2014 American animated fantasy film written and directed by Dean DeBlois, based on the book series by Cressida Cowell. Produced by DreamWorks Animation, it is the sequel to How to Train Your Dragon (2010) and the second installment in the How to Train Your Dragon trilogy. Jay Baruchel, Gerard Butler, Craig Ferguson, America Ferrera, Jonah Hill, Christopher Mintz-Plasse, Kristen Wiig, and T.J. Miller reprise their roles from the first film, with Cate Blanchett, Djimon Hounsou, and Kit Harington joining the cast. Set five years after the events of the first film, it follows 20-year-old Hiccup (Baruchel) and his friends as they encounter Valka (Blanchett), Hiccup's long-lost mother, and Drago Bludvist (Hounsou), a vengeful madman who wants to conquer the world by use of a dragon army.

A sequel to How to Train Your Dragon was announced in April 2010, with the outline first drafted in February. DeBlois, who co-directed the first film, agreed to return on the condition he would be allowed to make a trilogy. He cited The Empire Strikes Back (1980) and My Neighbor Totoro (1988) as his main inspirations, with the expanded scope of the former being particularly influential. DeBlois and his creative team visited Svalbard to look for inspirations for the setting. Composer John Powell returned to score the film. It was DreamWorks' first film to use scalable multi-core processing and the studio's new animation and lighting software.

How to Train Your Dragon 2 premiered at the 2014 Cannes Film Festival on May 21, 2014, and was released in the United States on June 13 by 20th Century Fox. Like its predecessor, it received critical acclaim, with praise for its animation, characters, writing, voice acting, score, action sequences, emotional depth and darker, more serious tone. It grossed $622 million, becoming the 12th-highest-grossing film of 2014. The film won the Golden Globe for Best Animated Feature and six Annie Awards, including Best Animated Feature, and was nominated for the Academy Award for Best Animated Feature. The final installment of the trilogy, How to Train Your Dragon: The Hidden World, was released in 2019. A live-action remake is scheduled for release in 2027.

== Plot ==
Five years after the Viking villagers of Berk and the dragons have made peace, (Note: As depicted in How to Train Your Dragon (2010)) Hiccup and his Night Fury best friend, Toothless, map out unexplored lands. Hiccup's father, Stoick the Vast, pressures him to succeed as chieftain, although Hiccup is uncertain whether he is ready.

While investigating a burnt forest, Hiccup and his girlfriend Astrid are ambushed by dragon trappers led by Eret, who works for Drago Bludvist, a warlord who plots to enslave all dragons into becoming soldiers. Hiccup and Astrid escape to Berk and warn Stoick about Drago. As Stoick fortifies Berk to prepare for battle, he explains that he once met Drago at a chieftain gathering, where Drago offered them protection from dragons if they pledged to serve him; upon denying him, he had his dragons attack them, leaving Stoick as the sole survivor.

Hiccup refuses to accept that war is inevitable and flies off with Toothless in search of Drago to change his mind. Instead, they encounter a mysterious dragon rider, who is revealed to be Hiccup's mother, Valka, who was presumed dead after being taken away by a dragon during a raid. Valka explains that, like her son, she could not bring herself to slay dragons; instead, she rescues them from Drago and brings them to an island nest formed out of ice by a massive, ice-breathing alpha dragon called a Bewilderbeast, which can control smaller dragons by emitting hypnotic sound waves. Stoick and his companion Gobber track Hiccup to the nest, where Stoick discovers that Valka is alive, and they finally reunite. Meanwhile, Astrid and the other riders force Eret to lead them to Drago, who captures them. Upon learning of Berk's dragons, Drago directs his armada to attack the dragon nest. He also tries to execute Eret, but Astrid's dragon, Stormfly, saves him, prompting Eret to help the others escape.

A battle rages at the nest between dragon riders, Valka's dragons, and Drago's armada. Drago unveils his own Bewilderbeast to confront the alpha, killing it and becoming the new Alpha, thus controlling all dragons. Hiccup urges Drago to cease the violence, but he refuses, citing his family's deaths from dragon attacks in his childhood and his desire to conquer the world. His Bewilderbeast hypnotizes Toothless and forces him to kill Hiccup, but Stoick sacrifices himself by taking the fatal blast instead, and Hiccup drives Toothless away out of grief. The group is stranded as Drago takes control of their dragons and rides Toothless to conquer Berk. After the group holds a Viking funeral for Stoick, Hiccup feels lost without his father and his dragon, where Valka reminds him that his father believed he could unite humans and dragons. Inspired, Hiccup and his allies return to Berk on baby dragons, immune to the Bewilderbeast's influence.

Back at Berk, they find that Drago has attacked the village and taken control of the dragons. Hiccup frees Toothless from the Bewilderbeast's control and confronts Drago before the Bewilderbeast encases them in ice, from which Toothless shields Hiccup. However, Toothless blasts away the ice and enters a glowing, super-powered dominant state, making him immune to the Bewilderbeast's control. Toothless challenges the Bewilderbeast while repeatedly shooting at it, breaking its control over the other dragons to side with him. The freed dragons fire at the Bewilderbeast until Toothless fires a massive blast, breaking its left tusk. Defeated, the Bewilderbeast retreats to the sea with Drago.

The Vikings and dragons celebrate their victory. Hiccup is officially made chieftain of Berk, Valka decides to stay with her son, and the dragons accept Toothless as the new alpha. Berk undergoes repairs, and Hiccup feels confident that they will defend their way of life.

== Voice cast ==
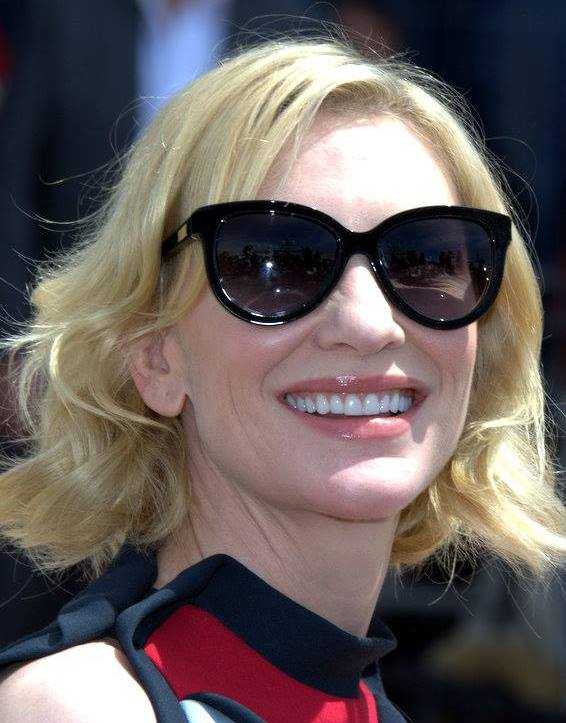
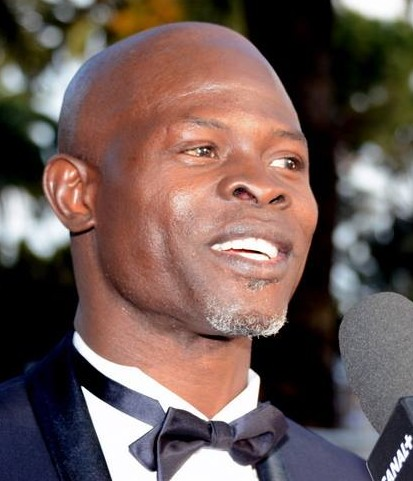
Cate Blanchett and Djimon Hounsou, who joined the cast as Valka and Drago Bludvist, respectively, attending the film's premiere at the 2014 Cannes Film Festival.
- Jay Baruchel as Hiccup Horrendous Haddock III, the son of the Viking chief Stoick the Vast and Valka, and Astrid's boyfriend.
- America Ferrera as Astrid Hofferson, Hiccup's girlfriend.
- Cate Blanchett as Valka Haddock, Stoick's wife, Hiccup's long-lost mother and a dragon rescuer.
  - Mary Jane Wells provides Valka's singing voice during "For the Dancing and the Dreaming"
- Gerard Butler as Stoick the Vast, chieftain of the Viking tribe of Berk, Hiccup's father and Valka's husband.
- Craig Ferguson as Gobber the Belch, Stoick's closest friend and a seasoned warrior.
- Jonah Hill as Snotlout Jorgenson.
- Christopher Mintz-Plasse as Fishlegs Ingerman.
- Kristen Wiig and T.J. Miller as Ruffnut and Tuffnut Thorston, the fraternal twins.
- Djimon Hounsou as Drago Bludvist, a ruthless warlord and dragon hunter who seeks to take over the world with a dragon army.
- Kit Harington as Eret, son of Eret, a dragon trapper who sells captured dragons to Drago.
- Randy Thom as vocal effects for Toothless and Stormfly.

== Production ==
=== Development ===
After the success of How to Train Your Dragon (2010), the sequel was announced on April 27, 2010. "How to Train Your Dragon … has become DreamWorks Animation's next franchise. We plan to release the sequel theatrically in 2013", said Jeffrey Katzenberg, DreamWorks Animation's CEO. It was later revealed that DeBlois had started drafting the outline for a sequel in February 2010 at Skywalker Ranch, during the final sound mix of the first film. The film was originally scheduled for release on June 20, 2014, but in August 2013 the release date was moved forward one week to June 13, 2014.

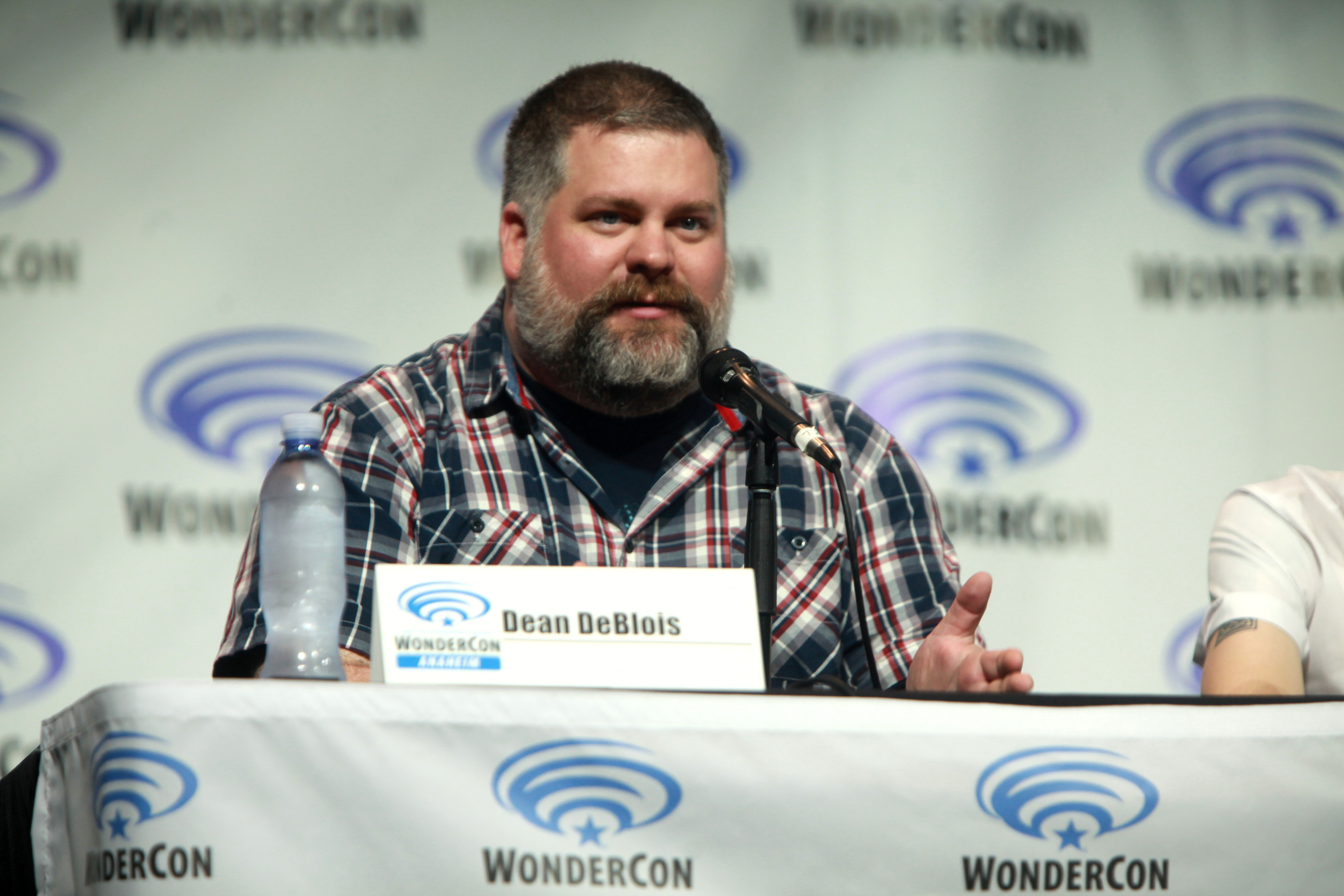
Director and writer Dean DeBlois promoting the film at the 2014 WonderCon.

The film was written, directed, and executive produced by Dean DeBlois, the co-writer/co-director of the first film. Bonnie Arnold, the producer of the first film, also returned, while Chris Sanders, who co-directed and co-wrote the first film, acted only as an additional executive producer this time due to his involvement with The Croods (2013). When offered the sequel, DeBlois accepted it on condition he could turn it into a trilogy. For the sequel, he intended to revisit the films of his youth, with The Empire Strikes Back (1980) and My Neighbor Totoro (1988) having the pivotal inspirations for the film. "What I loved especially about Empire is that it expanded Star Wars (1977) in every direction: emotionally, its scope, characters, fun. It felt like an embellishment and that's the goal."

The entire original voice cast—Baruchel, Butler, Ferguson, Ferrera, Hill, Mintz-Plasse, Miller and Wiig—returned for the sequel. On June 19, 2012, it was announced that Kit Harington, of Game of Thrones fame, was cast as one of the film's antagonists. At the 2013 San Diego Comic-Con, it was announced that Cate Blanchett and Djimon Hounsou had joined the cast; they lent their voices to Valka and Drago Bludvist, respectively.

While the first film was set in a generic North Sea environment, the creative team decided to focus on Norway this time around. Early in the sequel's development, about a dozen of them traveled there for a week-long research trip, where they toured Oslo, Bergen and the fjords. DeBlois, together with Gregg Taylor (DreamWorks' head of feature development) and Roger Deakins (a cinematographer who served as visual consultant), then broke off from the group to visit Svalbard and see polar bears in the wild with the assistance of armed guides.

DeBlois explained that he had learned from directing Lilo & Stitch (2002) that "if you set an animated film in a place you want to visit, there's a chance you might get to go there." He had wanted to visit Svalbard for some time, after learning of its stark beauty from a couple of backpackers he met during earlier visits to Iceland to work with post-rock band Sigur Rós on the documentary film Heima (2007).

An early draft for the film had Gobber the Belch being the one killed by the brainwashed Toothless under Drago Bludvist's orders instead of Stoick the Vast. However, when DeBlois shared his plot outline as originally envisioned to his colleague Guillermo del Toro, who had enjoyed the first film, del Toro suggested instead to have Stoick killed over Gobber, as Stoick had "exhausted" his narrative contribution and would represent a "crutch" for Hiccup if he were to become chief. DeBlois ultimately felt this was a right decision for the story and del Toro was given a "Thank you" credit.

=== Animation ===
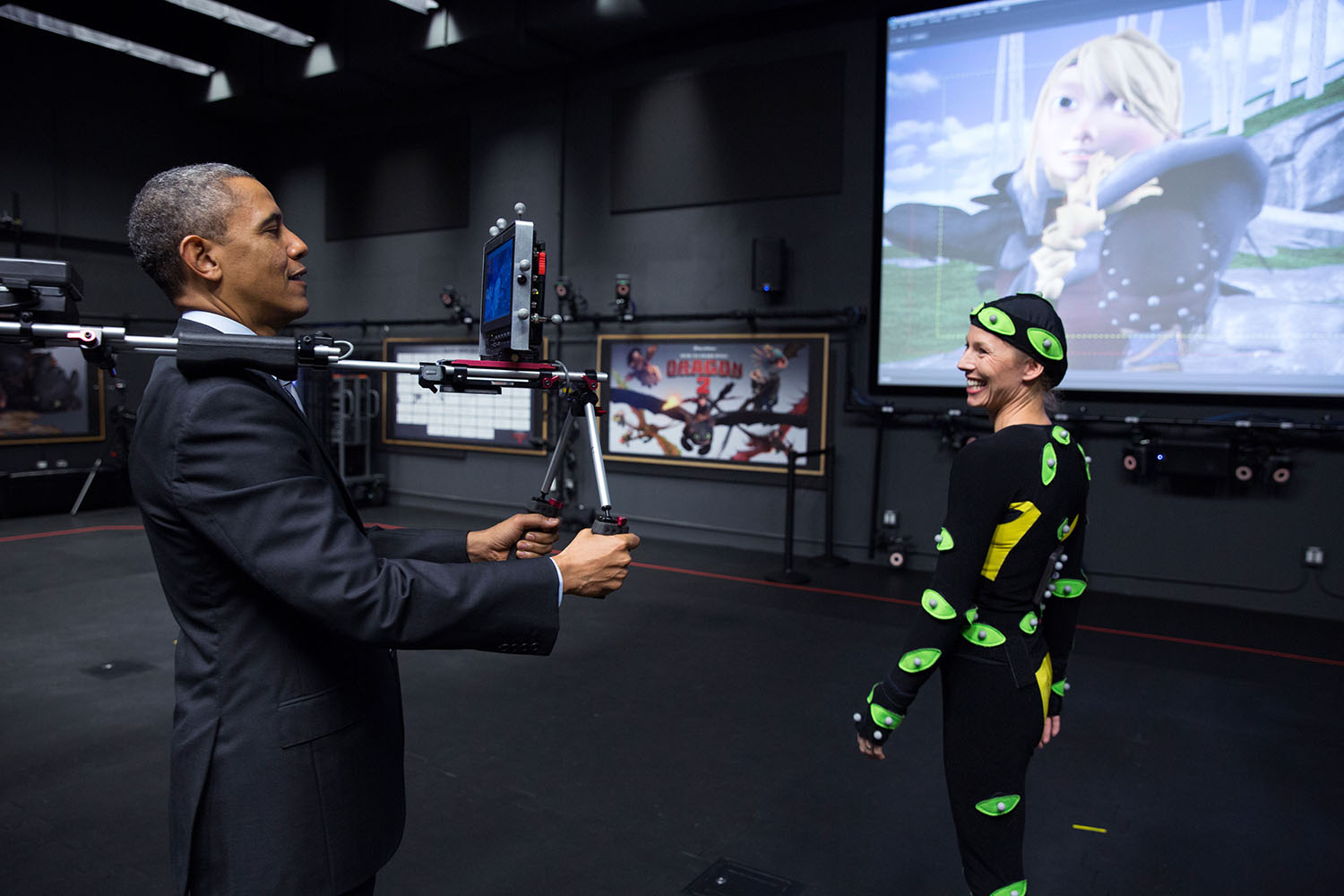
During a visit to DreamWorks Animation in November 2013, U.S. President Barack Obama tried a motion capture camera of the kind used to capture live-action reference performance for the film.

Over the five years before the film's release, DreamWorks Animation had substantially overhauled its production workflow and animation software. How to Train Your Dragon 2 was the first DreamWorks Animation film that used "scalable multicore processing", developed together with Hewlett-Packard. Called by Katzenberg as "the next revolution in filmmaking", it enabled artists for the first time to work on rich, complex images in real time, instead of waiting eight hours to see the results the next day. The film was also the studio's first film to use its new animation and lighting software through the entire production. Programs named Premo and Torch allowed much more subtlety, improving facial animation and enabling "the sense of fat, jiggle, loose skin, the sensation of skin moving over muscle instead of masses moving together."

By the time production was complete, over 500 people had worked on the film at DreamWorks Animation's headquarters in Glendale, as well as its branch offices at PDI/DreamWorks in Redwood City and DreamWorks India in Bangalore.

== Release ==
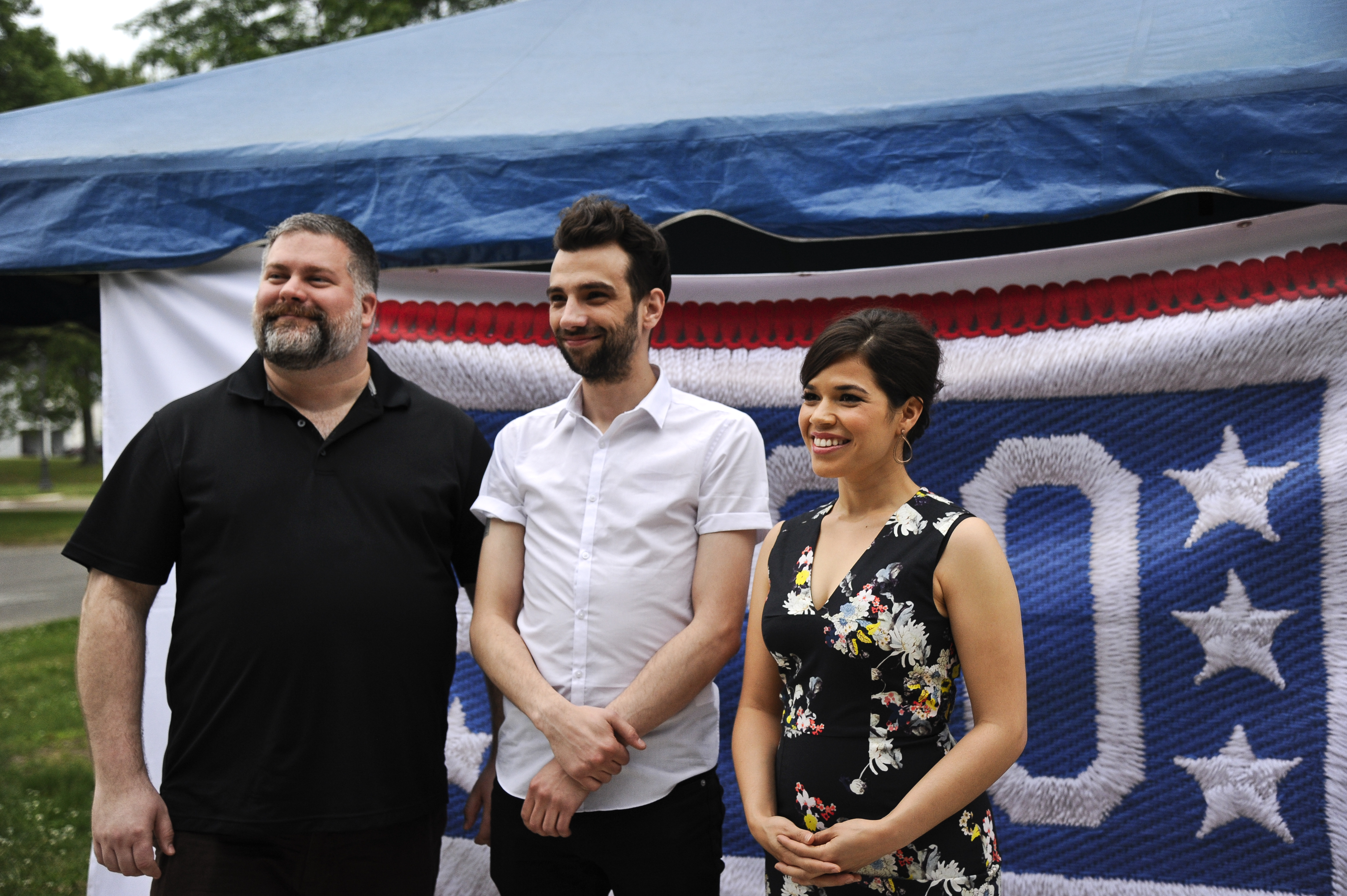
Dean DeBlois, Jay Baruchel, and America Ferrera at an advanced screening of the film for military members and their families on June 4, 2014, at Joint Base McGuire–Dix–Lakehurst.

The film was screened out of competition on May 16, 2014, at the 2014 Cannes Film Festival. In the United States, the film premiered on June 8, 2014, at the Regency Village Theater in Los Angeles, and was theatrically released on June 13, 2014. The film was also digitally remastered into IMAX 3D and released to international theaters on June 13, 2014.

=== Home media ===
How to Train Your Dragon 2 was released digitally on October 21, 2014, and was subsequently released on DVD and Blu-ray (both 2D and 3D) on November 11. The Blu-ray and digital releases are accompanied by a new animated short film entitled Dawn of the Dragon Racers (2014), in which Hiccup and friends compete to become the first Dragon Racing Champion of Berk.

A double DVD pack with the film and Dawn of the Dragon Racers was released exclusively at Walmart stores. As of February 2015, 7.5 million home entertainment units have been sold worldwide.

On January 22, 2019, Universal Pictures Home Entertainment released a 4K Ultra HD Blu-ray version of How to Train Your Dragon 2 alongside its predecessor, making them the first catalog DreamWorks Animation films to be released on that format.

== Reception ==
=== Critical response ===
Review aggregator website Rotten Tomatoes gives the film an approval rating of 92% based on reviews from 184 critics, with an average rating of 7.8/10. The website's critical consensus states: "Exciting, emotionally resonant, and beautifully animated, How to Train Your Dragon 2 builds on its predecessor's successes just the way a sequel should." Metacritic gives the film a score of 77 out of 100 based on reviews from 48 critics, indicating "generally favorable" reviews. Audiences surveyed by CinemaScore during the opening weekend gave the film an average grade of "A" on an A+ to F scale. Audiences were a mix of 47% female and 53% male. Children and Young Adults responded most strongly, with those aged under 25 giving a grade A+.

At the 2014 Cannes Film Festival, Peter Debruge of Variety praised the film and its ambitions: "The pressures to make a giant four-quadrant monstrosity must be enormous, and yet, like his unflappable hero Hiccup, How to Train Your Dragon 2 writer-director Dean DeBlois has prevailed, serving up DreamWorks Animation's strongest sequel yet—one that breathes fresh fire into the franchise, instead of merely rehashing the original. Braver than Brave, more fun than Frozen, and more emotionally satisfying than so many of its live-action counterparts, Dragon delivers. And good thing, too, since DWA desperately needs another toon to cross the half-billion-dollar threshold." Elizabeth Weitzman of the New York Daily News gave the film three out of five stars, saying "It's the unflinching edge that gives the film its unexpected depth." Jocelyn Noveck of the Associated Press gave the film three out of four stars, saying "How to Train Your Dragon 2 doesn't play it safe, and that's why it's the rare sequel that doesn't feel somewhat stale." Joe McGovern of Entertainment Weekly gave the film a B, saying "The flight path needs straightening, but this is still a franchise that knows how to fly." Jody Mitori of the St. Louis Post-Dispatch gave the film three out of four stars, saying "For audiences who want a sweet story, they can't beat the first film of a boy finding his best friend. For those who are ready for the next stage, try this one about a boy becoming a man."

Bill Goodykoontz of The Arizona Republic gave the film four out of five stars, saying "It seemed as if there was nowhere new to go after the first film, but this is a richer story that dares to go darker and is thus more rewarding." Peter Travers of Rolling Stone gave the film three-and-a-half stars out of four, saying "Dragon 2, like The Empire Strikes Back, takes sequels to a new level of imagination and innovation. It truly is a high-flying, depth-charging wonder to behold." Peter Hartlaub of the San Francisco Chronicle gave the film three out of four stars, saying "DeBlois, who also wrote the script, successfully juggles the multiple story lines, shifting allegiances and uncharted lands." Rafer Guzman of Newsday gave the film three out of four stars, saying "Gruesome? A little. Scary? You bet. But that's exactly what makes the Dragon films so different, and so much better, than the average children's fare." Michael Phillips of the Chicago Tribune gave the film three-and-a-half stars out of four, saying "For once, we have an animated sequel free of the committee-job vibe so common at every animation house, no matter the track record." Stephen Holden of The New York Times gave the film a negative review, saying "The story seems to be going somewhere until it comes to a halt with the inevitable showdown between the forces of darkness and the forces of light." Peter Howell of the Toronto Star gave the film three out of four stars, saying "Taking its cues as much from Star Wars and Game of Thrones as from its own storybook narrative, How to Train Your Dragon 2 breathes fire into a franchise sequel."

Claudia Puig of USA Today gave the film three out of four stars, saying "Nearly as exuberant as the original, How to Train Your Dragon 2 nimbly avoids sequel-itis." Colin Covert of the Star Tribune gave the film four out of four stars, saying: "The impressive part is the storytelling confidence of writer/director Dean DeBlois. He has created a thoughtful tale as meaningful for grown-ups as it is pleasurable for its young primary audience." Stephanie Merry of The Washington Post gave the film three-and-a-half stars out of four, saying "This may be the first and last time anyone says this, but if How to Train Your Dragon 2 is this good, why stop at 3 and 4?" Moira MacDonald of The Seattle Times gave the film three-and-a-half stars out of four, saying: "Young and old fans of the first movie will be lining up for the wit, for the inventiveness of the characters, for the breathtaking visuals — and just the sheer fun of it all." Tirdad Derakhshani of The Philadelphia Inquirer gave the film three-and-a-half stars out of four, saying: "One of this year's true surprises, the superior animated sequel not only is infused with the same independent spirit and off-kilter aesthetic that enriched the original, it also deepens the first film's major themes." Stephen Whitty of the Newark Star-Ledger gave the film two-and-a-half stars out of four, saying: "This was not a sequel that anybody needed, outside of the accountants. And there's another already planned." John Semley of The Globe and Mail gave the film four out of four stars, saying: "More than just teaching kids what to think about the world they're coming into, it's a rare film that encourages them to think for themselves."

Rene Rodriguez of the Miami Herald gave the film three-and-a-half stars out of four, saying: "How to Train Your Dragon 2 is its own standalone picture, with a surprising range of emotions that surpasses the original and a brisk pace and manner of storytelling that give it purpose and direction. The fact that it's also so much fun, no matter what your age, almost feels like a bonus." Bill Zwecker of the Chicago Sun-Times gave the film four out of four stars, saying: "Not only does this second movie match the charm, wit, animation skill and intelligent storytelling of the original, I think it even exceeds it." Lisa Kennedy of The Denver Post gave the film a positive review, saying: "How to Train Your Dragon 2 is soaring, emotionally swooping, utterly satisfying fun." Bob Mondello of NPR gave the film an 8.5 out of 10, saying: "It's clear that [director Dean DeBlois] took inspiration from the first Star Wars trilogy—not a bad model for breathing new life, and yes, a bit of fire, into one of Hollywood's more nuanced animated franchises." Inkoo Kang of The Wrap gave the film a mixed review, saying: "If there isn't enough to feel, at least there's a lot to look at. Thanks to the superb 3-D direction by DeBlois, we swoop through the air, whoosh down dragons' tails, and juuust baaaarely [sic] squeeze into small crevices, but still, those experiences are only like being on a really great rollercoaster—they don't mean anything." A. A. Dowd of The A.V. Club gave the film a B−, saying: "There aren't just more dragons, but more characters, more plot, more everything. The trade-off is that the charm of the original gets a little lost, a casualty of rapid-franchise expansion."

=== Box office ===
How to Train Your Dragon 2 grossed $177 million in North America, and $445 million in other countries, for a worldwide total of $622 million. The film is the second-highest-grossing animated film of 2014, behind Big Hero 6, and the twelfth-highest-grossing film of the year in any genre. While How to Train Your Dragon 2 only earned $177 million at the US box office, compared to $217 million for its predecessor, it performed much better at the international box office, earning $438 million to How to Train Your Dragon's $277 million. Calculating in all expenses, Deadline Hollywood estimated that the film made a profit of $107.3 million.

In the United States and Canada, the film earned $18.5 million on its opening day, and opened at number two in its first weekend below 22 Jump Street, with $49,451,322. In its second weekend, the film dropped to number three, grossing an additional $24,719,312. In its third weekend, the film stayed at number three, grossing $13,237,697. In its fourth weekend, the film dropped to number five, grossing $8,961,088.

Its $25.9 million opening weekend in China was the biggest-ever for an animated film in the country, surpassing the record previously held by Kung Fu Panda 2.

=== Accolades ===
Accolades received by How to Train Your Dragon 2
| Award | Date of ceremony | Category | Recipient(s) | Result | Ref. |
|---|---|---|---|---|---|
| 3D Creative Arts Awards | January 28, 2015 | Best Feature Film – Animation | How to Train Your Dragon 2 | Nominated | |
| 3D Creative Arts Awards | January 28, 2015 | Best Stereoscopic Feature Film – Animation | How to Train Your Dragon 2 | Won | |
| Academy Awards | February 22, 2015 | Best Animated Feature | Dean DeBlois and Bonnie Arnold | Nominated | |
| Annie Awards | January 31, 2015 | Best Animated Feature | How to Train Your Dragon 2 | Won | |
| Annie Awards | January 31, 2015 | Outstanding Achievement for Animated Effects in an Animated Production | James Jackson, Lucas Janin, Tobin Jones, Baptiste Van Opstal, and Jason Mayer | Nominated | |
| Annie Awards | January 31, 2015 | Outstanding Achievement for Character Animation in a Feature Production | Fabio Lignini | Won | |
| Annie Awards | January 31, 2015 | Outstanding Achievement for Character Animation in a Feature Production | Steven Hornby | Nominated | |
| Annie Awards | January 31, 2015 | Outstanding Achievement for Character Animation in a Feature Production | Thomas Grummt | Nominated | |
| Annie Awards | January 31, 2015 | Outstanding Achievement for Directing in a Feature Production | Dean DeBlois | Won | |
| Annie Awards | January 31, 2015 | Outstanding Achievement for Music in a Feature Production | John Powell and Jónsi | Won | |
| Annie Awards | January 31, 2015 | Outstanding Achievement for Storyboarding in a Feature Production | Truong Son Mai | Won | |
| Annie Awards | January 31, 2015 | Outstanding Achievement for Writing in an Animated Feature Production | Dean DeBlois | Nominated | |
| Annie Awards | January 31, 2015 | Outstanding Achievement for Editorial in an Animated Feature Production | John K. Carr | Won | |
| ASCAP Awards | March 9, 2015 | Top Box Office Films | John Powell (Note: Also for Rio 2 (2014)) | Won | |
| British Academy Children's Awards | November 23, 2014 | Kid's Vote — Film | How to Train Your Dragon 2 | Nominated | |
| British Academy Children's Awards | November 23, 2014 | Feature Film | How to Train Your Dragon 2 | Nominated | |
| Chicago Film Critics Association Awards | December 15, 2014 | Best Animated Film | How to Train Your Dragon 2 | Nominated | |
| Cinema Audio Society Awards | February 14, 2015 | Outstanding Achievement in Sound Mixing for a Motion Picture – Animated | Tighe Sheldon, Randy Thom, Shawn Murphy, Brandon Proctor, and Corey Tyler | Nominated | |
| Critics' Choice Movie Awards | January 15, 2015 | Best Animated Feature | How to Train Your Dragon 2 | Nominated | |
| Florida Film Critics Circle Awards | December 19, 2014 | Best Animated Film | How to Train Your Dragon 2 | Nominated | |
| Georgia Film Critics Association Awards | January 9, 2015 | Best Animated Film | How to Train Your Dragon 2 | Nominated | |
| Golden Globe Awards | January 11, 2015 | Best Animated Feature Film | How to Train Your Dragon 2 | Won | |
| Golden Reel Awards | February 15, 2015 | Outstanding Achievement in Sound Editing – Sound Effects, Foley, Dialogue and ADR for Animated Feature Film | Randy Thom, Michael Silvers, Al Nelson, Brian Chumney, Sean England, Robin Harlan, Mac Smith, Jeremy Bowker, Pascal Garneau, and Sue Fox | Nominated | |
| Golden Trailer Awards | May 30, 2014 | Best Animation/Family | "Master" (Aspect Ratio) | Nominated | |
| Hollywood Film Awards | November 14, 2014 | Hollywood Animation Award | How to Train Your Dragon 2 | Nominated | |
| Hollywood Music in Media Awards | November 4, 2014 | Original Score – Animated Film | John Powell | Won | |
| Hollywood Music in Media Awards | November 4, 2014 | Original Song – Animated Film | John Powell and Jónsi for "Where No One Goes" | Nominated | |
| Houston Film Critics Society Awards | January 10, 2015 | Best Animated Film | How to Train Your Dragon 2 | Nominated | |
| International Cinephile Society Awards | February 20, 2015 | Best Animated Film | How to Train Your Dragon 2 | Nominated | |
| International Film Music Critics Association Awards | February 19, 2015 | Film Score of the Year | John Powell | Nominated | |
| International Film Music Critics Association Awards | February 19, 2015 | Best Original Score for an Animated Film | John Powell | Won | |
| International Film Music Critics Association Awards | February 19, 2015 | Film Music Composition of the Year | John Powell for "Flying with Mother" | Won | |
| National Board of Review | December 2, 2014 | Best Animated Film | How to Train Your Dragon 2 | Won | |
| Nickelodeon Kids' Choice Awards | March 28, 2015 | Favorite Animated Movie | How to Train Your Dragon 2 | Nominated | |
| Online Film Critics Society Awards | December 15, 2014 | Best Animated Film | How to Train Your Dragon 2 | Nominated | |
| People's Choice Awards | January 7, 2015 | Favorite Family Movie | How to Train Your Dragon 2 | Nominated | |
| Producers Guild of America Awards | January 24, 2015 | Best Animated Motion Picture | How to Train Your Dragon 2 | Nominated | |
| San Diego Film Critics Society Awards | December 15, 2014 | Best Animated Film | How to Train Your Dragon 2 | Nominated | |
| San Francisco Film Critics Circle Awards | December 14, 2014 | Best Animated Feature | How to Train Your Dragon 2 | Nominated | |
| Satellite Awards | February 15, 2015 | Best Animated or Mixed Media Feature | How to Train Your Dragon 2 | Nominated | |
| Saturn Awards | June 25, 2015 | Best Animated Film | How to Train Your Dragon 2 | Nominated | |
| Seattle International Film Festival Awards | June 7, 2014 | Golden Space Needle Award – Best Film | How to Train Your Dragon 2 | Second runner-up | |
| St. Louis Film Critics Association Awards | December 15, 2014 | Best Animated Film | How to Train Your Dragon 2 | Nominated | |
| Toronto Film Critics Association Awards | December 15, 2014 | Best Animated Film | How to Train Your Dragon 2 | Nominated | |
| Visual Effects Society Awards | February 4, 2015 | Outstanding Visual Effects in an Animated Feature | Bonnie Arnold, Dean DeBlois, Dave Walvoord, and Simon Otto | Nominated | |
| Visual Effects Society Awards | February 4, 2015 | Outstanding Animated Character in an Animated Feature | Jakob Hjort Jensen, Fabio Lignini, Stephen Candell, and Hongseo Park for "Hiccup" | Nominated | |
| Visual Effects Society Awards | February 4, 2015 | Outstanding Created Environment in an Animated Feature | Sun Yoon, Liang-Yuan Wang, Ted Davis, and Shannon Thomas for "Oasis" | Nominated | |
| Visual Effects Society Awards | February 4, 2015 | Outstanding Effects Simulations in an Animated Feature | Spencer Knapp, Baptiste Van Opstal, Lucas Janin, and Jason Mayer for "The Battle" | Nominated | |
| Washington D.C. Area Film Critics Association Awards | December 8, 2014 | Best Animated Feature | How to Train Your Dragon 2 | Nominated | |

== Music ==
Composer John Powell, who earned his first Academy Award nomination for his music in the original movie, returned to score the sequel. Powell described the project as "a maturation story" and stated that he too tried to achieve the same maturation in the structure of his music by developing further every aspect of his compositions from the original film. Recording took place during April 2014 at Abbey Road Studios in London with a 120-piece orchestra, a 100-voice choir, and a wide array of ethnic instruments, including Celtic harp, uilleann bagpipes, tin whistle, bodhrán, and Highland bagpipes; the latter of which were performed by pipers from the Scottish group Red Hot Chilli Pipers. The ensemble was conducted by the composer's usual collaborator Gavin Greenaway.

Sigur Rós' lead vocalist, Jónsi, who wrote and performed the song "Sticks & Stones" for the first film, provided two new original songs for the sequel in collaboration with Powell: "For the Dancing and the Dreaming" (performed by Gerard Butler, Craig Ferguson and Mary Jane Wells) and "Where No One Goes" (performed by Jónsi himself). Belarusian-Norwegian artist Alexander Rybak, who voices Hiccup in the Norwegian dub of the film, also wrote and performed the song "Into a Fantasy", which is only featured in the European versions of the film.

The soundtrack album for the film was released on June 13, 2014, by Relativity Music Group. The album features over an hour of score by Powell; additional music by Anthony Willis and Paul Mounsey, as well as the two original songs written by Powell and Jónsi. Rybak's song "Into a Fantasy" was released separately as a single. A deluxe edition, consisting of previously unreleased music, was released by Varèse Sarabande in May 2022.

== Video game ==
A video game based on the film, also titled How to Train Your Dragon 2, was released in June 2014 by Little Orbit. Developed by Torus Games, the game is available for Xbox 360, Nintendo 3DS, Wii, Wii U, and PlayStation 3.

== Related projects ==
=== Sequel ===
The third installment in the trilogy, How to Train Your Dragon: The Hidden World, was released on February 22, 2019; the release date had been changed multiple times due to various distributor changes. (Note: Attributed to multiple references:) DeBlois, Arnold, Powell and all of the main cast (with the exception of Miller, whose role was recast to Justin Rupple) returned for the third film, with Blanchett and Harington reprising their roles from the second. F. Murray Abraham joined the cast as Grimmel.

=== Live-action remake ===
On April 2, 2025, Universal Pictures announced a live-action remake of How to Train Your Dragon 2, following the live-action remake of the first film. How to Train Your Dragon 2 is scheduled for release on June 11, 2027. In January 2026, it was revealed that Blanchett would reprise her role as Valka, and that Ólafur Darri Ólafsson had been cast as Drago. Phil Dunster was later announced to have been cast as Eret.
