= Rio (soundtrack) =

2011 soundtrack albums

Rio (Music from the Motion Picture)

Soundtrack album by Various Artists
- Released: April 5, 2011
- Recorded: 2009–2010
- Genres: Pop; Latin; alternative hip hop; R&B; pop rock
- Length: 38:11
- Labels: Interscope; will.i.am
- Producers: Sérgio Mendes; John Powell

Singles from Rio (Music from the Motion Picture)
- 1. "Telling the World" Released: March 20, 2011

The 2011 animated musical comedy film of the same name, produced by Blue Sky Studios and 20th Century Fox Animation, and directed by Carlos Saldanha, featured two albums released for the film: an original soundtrack and an original score. Interscope Records released the film's soundtrack Rio (Music from the Motion Picture) on April 5, 2011, in digital formats, and a physical release on April 12. The album produced by the film's composer John Powell, and Brazilian musician Sérgio Mendes, featured collaborations from Brazilian and American artists, along with songs performed by the film's cast members. The music received critical acclaim from critics, praising the Brazilian influences in the music and creative choices of involving the native musicians to influence South American culture. Powell's score was a separate album, titled Rio (Original Motion Picture Score), which was released by Varèse Sarabande on April 19, 2011.

== Soundtrack album ==
The soundtrack takes inspiration from Brazilian music, and several songs under various genres were written and produced. Brazilian musician Sérgio Mendes contributed to the soundtrack, as an executive producer with John Powell. On March 13, 2011, during his performance at the Geffen Playhouse in Los Angeles, Mendes revealed the official soundtrack list, and also announced that he would re-record the classical Brazilian song "Mas que Nada" for the film and album.

Stating his involvement in the project, Mendes said that "The film is such a celebration of Brazilian life, of Carnival, the nature, the rhythms, the joy, the sensuality. It's nicely timed with my record." The album featured performances from the film's cast, Jesse Eisenberg, Anne Hathaway, Jamie Foxx, along with rapper-singer will.i.am (also featuring in the film's cast), and contributions from Brazilian artists Carlinhos Brown, Mikael Mutti, Gracinha Leporace, Bebel Gilberto, American artists Siedah Garrett, Ester Dean and British singer-songwriter Taio Cruz performing.

=== Release ===
On March 18, 2011, Brazilian-English singer-songwriter Taio Cruz released a music video and theme song named "Telling the World" on YouTube for the soundtrack. The single was later released for digital download on March 20. The soundtrack was digitally released by Interscope Records on April 5, and was distributed in physical CD formats, the following week (April 12). will.i.am performed a remix of the track "Drop It Low", to celebrate the film's release and uploaded it on YouTube on April 11, 2011.

=== Track listing ===
==== Standard ====
No.	Title	Writer(s)	Performer(s)	Length
1.	"Real in Rio"	Sérgio Mendes; Carlinhos Brown; Mikael Mutti; John Powell; Siedah Garrett	Jesse Eisenberg; Jamie Foxx; Anne Hathaway; George Lopez; will.i.am; The Rio Singers	3:47
2.	"Let Me Take You to Rio" (Blu's Arrival)	Ester Dean; Brown; Mutti	Dean; Brown	1:54
3.	"Mas que Nada" (2011 Rio Version)	Jorge Ben Jor	Mendes; Gracinha Leporace	2:44
4.	"Hot Wings" (I Wanna Party)	will.i.am	will.i.am; Foxx; Hathaway	2:16
5.	"Pretty Bird"	Jemaine Clement; Powell; Yoni Brenner; Mike Reiss	Clement	2:03
6.	"Fly Love"	Brown; Garrett	Foxx	2:39
7.	"Telling the World"	Taio Cruz; Alan Kasirye	Cruz	3:33
8.	"Funky Monkey"	Brown; Mutti; Garrett	Garrett; Brown; Mutti; Davi Vieira	2:24
9.	"Take You to Rio"	Dean; Mikkel Storleer Eriksen; Tor Erik Hermansen	Dean	3:26
10.	"Balanco Carioca"	Mendes; Brown; Mutti	Brown; Mutti	3:01
11.	"Sapo Cai"	Mendes; Brown; Mutti	Brown; Mutti	2:46
12.	"Samba de Orly"	Antonio Pecci; Filho Chico Buarque	Bebel Gilberto	2:49
13.	"Valsa Carioca"	Mendes	Mendes	2:35
14.	"Forro da Fruta" (Bonus track)	Mendes; Brown; Mutti	Brown; Mutti	2:11
Total length:				38:08

==== International version ====
No.	Title	Writer(s)	Performer(s)	Length
1.	"Real in Rio"	Mendes; Brown; Mutti; Powell; Garrett	Eisenberg; Foxx; Hathaway; Lopez; will.i.am; The Rio Singers	3:47
2.	"Let Me Take You to Rio" (Blu's Arrival)	Dean; Brown; Mutti	Dean; Brown	1:54
3.	"Mas que Nada" (2011 Rio Version)	Jor	Mendes; Leporace	2:44
4.	"Hot Wings" (I Wanna Party)	will.i.am	will.i.am; Foxx; Hathaway	2:16
5.	"Pretty Bird"	Clement; Powell; Brenner; Reiss	Clement	2:03
6.	"Fly Love"	Brown; Garrett	Foxx	2:39
7.	"Telling the World"	Cruz; Kasirye	Cruz	3:33
8.	"Funky Monkey"	Brown; Mutti; Garrett	Garrett; Brown; Mutti; Davi Vieira	2:24
9.	"Take You to Rio"	Dean; Eriksen; Hermansen	Dean	3:26
10.	"Balanco Carioca"	Mendes; Brown; Mutti	Brown; Mutti	3:01
11.	"Sapo Cai"	Mendes; Brown; Mutti	Brown; Mutti	2:46
12.	"Samba de Orly"	Pecci; Buarque	Gilberto	2:49
13.	"Valsa Carioca"	Mendes	Mendes	2:35
14.	"Copacabana Dreams"	Mendes	Mendes	2:20
Total length:				38:24

==== Brazilian version ====
In the Brazilian edition some songs gained a Portuguese version performed by famous Brazilian artists such as Ivete Sangalo (replacing Ester Dean in "Take You to Rio (Remix)") and Carlinhos Brown (replacing Jamie Foxx in "Fly Love"). "Real in Rio" became "Favo de Mel" (Honeycomb) but it was performed by the same artists as the English version.

=== Reception ===
Reviewing the soundtrack, Jason Newman of MTV wrote "The toe-tapping, easily digestible rhythms inherent in so much classic Brazilian music dovetails nicely with a movie geared toward children. But since kids don't spend money, we also get Taio Cruz and will.i.am to ensure that those precious commercial demographics are hit. It's a win for 20th Century Fox; a half-win for the rest of us." Matt Collar of AllMusic wrote "Rio is a sunny, dance-oriented album well suited to the film's South American setting."

=== Charts ===
Chart (2011)	Peak position
US Billboard 200	60
US Digital Albums (Billboard)	10
US Top R&B/Hip-Hop Albums (Billboard)	6
US Top Rap Albums (Billboard)	2
US Kid Albums (Billboard)	8
US Soundtracks (Billboard)	4

=== Accolades ===
At the 39th Annie Awards, the music received a nomination for Best Music in a Feature Production but lost to John Williams for The Adventures of Tintin. The song "Real in Rio" was nominated for Best Original Song at the 84th Academy Awards, but lost to the other nominee Man or Muppet from The Muppets.

=== Personnel ===
Credits adapted from CD liner notes.

- Producer – John Powell, Sergio Mendes
- Programming – Beth Caucci, Michael John Mollo, Paul Mounsey, Victor Chaga, John Powell
- Arrangements – Beth Caucci, Michael John Mollo, Paul Mounsey, Victor Chaga, John Powell
- Recording – Bill Schnee, Marc Viner, Shawn Murphy, Aubry "Big Juice" Delaine, Padraic "Padlock" Kerin, will.i.am, Matt Shane, Mikkel Storleer Eriksen, Miles Walker, Tim Lauber, Erik Swanson
- Music editor – Tom Carlson
- Score editor – David Channing
- Engineer – Denis St. Amand, Adam Kagan, Juliette Amoroso, Damien Lewis
- Mixing – Brad Haehnel, Shawn Murphy, Bill Schnee, Greg Hayes, John Traunwieser, Marc Viner, Matt Ward, Dyland "3D" Dresdow, Phil Tan, Didiê Cunha
- Mastering – Fernando Lee, Stephen Marsh
- Music co-ordinator – Germaine Franco
- Music preparation – Joann Kane Music Service, Mark Graham
- Musical Assistance – Devin Kelly, Eric Wegener, Erin McAnally, Grace Lai, Jacob Merryman

Instruments

- Bass – Nico Abondolo, René Camacho
- Flute – Pedro Eustache
- Guitar – George Doering, Jemaine Clement, Kleber Jorge, Mikael Mutti
- Percussion – Alberto Lopez, Antonio DeSantanna, Carlos A.S. De Oliveira, Davi Vieira, Jose "Ce Bruno" Eisenberg, Jose Jesus, Leonardo Costa, Luis Claudio Candido, Marco "Gibi" Dos Santos, Mikael Mutti, Nailton "Meia Noite" Dos Santos, Wagner Profeta Santos, Carlinhos Brown
- Whistle – Carlinhos Brown, John Powell, Mikael Mutti

Orchestra

- Orchestration – Andrew Kinney, John Powell, Ben Wallfisch, Dave Metzger, Germaine Franco, John Ashton Thomas, Jon Kull, Randy Kerber, Rick Giovinazzo
- MIDI orchestration – Beth Caucci, Michael John Mollo, Paul Mounsey, Victor Chaga
- Concertmaster – Bruce Dukov
- Score conductor – Pete Anthony
- Score contractor – Gina Zimmitti
- Vocal contractor – Edie Lehmann Boddicker
- Stage manager – Greg Dennen, Tom Steel

Management

- Business affairs (Interscope Records) – Jason Kawejsza, Rand Hoffman
- Business affairs (Twentieth Century Fox) – Tom Cavanaugh
- Director of international marketing – Tomoko Itoki
- Executive in charge of music (Interscope Records) – Tony Seyler
- Executive in charge of music (Twentieth Century Fox) – Robert Kraft
- Head of international marketing – Jurgen Grebner
- Marketing (Interscope Records) – Julie Hovsepian
- Music clearance – Ellen Ginsburg
- Soundtrack executive producer (Twentieth Century Fox) – Andrew Van Meter
- Music production supervisor (Twentieth Century Fox) – Rebecca Morellato
- Music supervisor (Twentieth Century Fox) – Danielle Diego
- Music co-ordinator (Twentieth Century Fox) – Johnny Choi

Artwork

- Art direction – Dina Hovsepian
- Graphics – David Dibble, Jason Sadler, Tom Cardone
- Illustration – Marcella Bingham

== Original score ==
Rio (Original Motion Picture Score)

Film score by John Powell
- Released: April 19, 2011
- Recorded: 2010–2011
- Studios: Newman Scoring Stage, 20th Century Fox Studios (Los Angeles, California); 5 Cat Studios (Los Angeles, California); Capitol Studios (Hollywood, California)
- Genres: Pop; classical
- Length: 47:04
- Label: Varèse Sarabande
- Producer: John Powell

John Powell chronology
Mars Needs Moms (2011)	Rio (2011)	Kung Fu Panda 2 (2011)

As with previous Blue Sky's productions, John Powell composed the film's original score, which was released into a separate album on April 19, 2011, by Varèse Sarabande.

=== Track listing ===
No.	Title	Length
1.	"Morning Routine"	2:23
2.	"Meet Tulio"	2:55
3.	"Great Big Momma Bird"	2:47
4.	"Paradise Concern"	1:59
5.	"Bagged and Missing"	2:09
6.	"Locked Up"	2:10
7.	"Chained Chase"	2:35
8.	"Bedtime Flyers"	2:58
9.	"Idiot Glider"	1:56
10.	"Juicy Little Mango"	2:27
11.	"Umbrellas of Rio"	2:27
12.	"Motorbike"	1:23
13.	"Bird Fight"	1:03
14.	"Birds Moved"	2:33
15.	"Heimlich"	2:31
16.	"Birdnapped"	3:37
17.	"Rio Airport"	4:24
18.	"Flying"	2:43
19.	"Market Forro"	2:11
Total length:		47:11

=== Reception ===
Filmtracks.com wrote "After Powell's stunning success with How to Train Your Dragon, his scores will inevitably be compared to that benchmark, and while Rio exhibits the same talent in its ranks, the 2011 score lacks the cohesiveness and consistently impressive passages of its predecessor. Those who don't care for the heavy, parody-like Latin influence will likely prefer the composer's recent Mars Needs Moms. Still, Powell is almost always good for a solid three stars in response to these kinds of efforts, and he achieves that rating again with ease." James Christopher Monger of AllMusic wrote "Powell, who worked on all of the Ice Age sequels, as well as King Fu Panda and How to Train Your Dragon, is no stranger to animated films, and his work here is both unobtrusive and effective, blending Midwest Americana and sunny tropicalismo into a tasty summer beverage."

=== Personnel ===
Credits adapted from CD liner notes.

- Composer, producer – John Powell
- Assistant production – Devin Kelly, Eric Wegener, Erin McAnally, Grace Lai, Jacob Merryman
- Programming, arrangements – Dominic Lewis, John Powell, Paul Mounsey, Beth Caucci, Michael Mollo, Victor Chaga
- Engineer – Denis St. Amand
- Recording – Erik Swanson
- Mixing – Brad Haehnel, Shawn Murphy, Greg Hayes, John Traunwieser, Marc Viner, Matt Ward
- Mastering – Fernando Lee, Stephen Marsh
- Editing – David Channing, Tom Carlson
- Executive producer – Robert Townson
- Music co-ordinator – Germaine Franco
- Copyist – Joann Kane Music Service, Mark Graham

Instruments

- Bass – Ann Atkinson, Bruce Morgenthaler, Chris Kollgaard, Ed Meares, Frances Liu, Mike Valerio, Sue Ranney
- Bassoon – John Mitchell, John Steinmetz, Rose Corrigan
- Cello – Tony Cooke, Tina Soule, Chris Ermacoff, Erika Duke Kirkpatrick, Jodi Burnett, Miguel Martinez, Paul Cohen, Paula Hochhalter, Steve Richards, Tim Loo, Victor Lawrence
- Clarinet – Greg Huckins, Justo Almario, Stuart Clark
- Drums – Mike Shapiro
- Electric Bass – Nico Abondolo, Rene Camacho
- Flute – Chris Bleth, Geri Rotella, Heather Clark, Pedro Eustache
- French Horn – Dan Kelley, Dylan Hart, Jim Thatcher, Jennie Kim, Joe Meyer, Phil Yao, Steve Becknell, Teag Reeves
- Guitar – George Doering, Jemaine Clement, Kleber Jorge, Marcel Camargo, Mikael Mutti, Roberto Montero
- Harp – Katie Kirkpatrick, Marcia Dickstein
- Keyboards – Sergio Mendes
- Oboe – David Weiss, John Yoakum
- Percussion – Alberto Lopez, Antonio DeSantanna, Carlos A.S. De Oliveira, Davi Vieira, Jose "Ce Bruno" Eisenberg, Jose Jesus, Leonardo Costa, Luis Claudio Candido, Marco "Gibi" Dos Santos, Mikael Mutti, Nailton "Meia Noite" Dos Santos, Wagner Profeta Santos, Carlinhos Brown
- Piano, celesta – Randy Kerber
- Saxophone – Dan Higgins, John Mitchell
- Trombone – Alex Iles, Andrew Lippman, Bill Reichenbach, Charlie Loper, Phil Teele
- Trumpet – Dan Fornero, Harry Kim, Jon Lewis, Rick Baptist
- Tuba – Doug Tornquist
- Viola – Alma Fernandez, Andrew Duckles, Brian Dembow, Darren McCann, David Walther, Kate Reddish, Kazi Pitelka, Keith Green, Lynne Richberg, Marlow Fisher, Matt Funes, Thomas Diener, Vickie Miskolczy
- Violin – Alan Grunfeld, Alyssa Park, Ana Landauer, Bruce Dukov, Carol Pool, Darius Campo, Eric Hosler, Eun Mee Ahn, Eve Butler, Grace Oh, Irina Voloshina, Jennie Levin*, Joel Derouin, Julie Rogers, Katia Popov, Kevin Connolly, Liane Mautner, Lily Ho Chen, Marc Sazer, Marina Manukian, Natalie Leggett, Neel Hammond, Nina Evtuhov, Richard Altenbach, Roberto Cani, Sara Parkins, Shalini Vijayan, Sid Page, Tami Hatwan, Yelena Yegoryan, Roger Wilkie
- Whistle – Carlinhos Brown, John Powell, Mikael Mutti

Orchestra

- Performer – The Hollywood Studio Symphony
- Orchestrated By – Andrew Kinney, Ben Wallfisch, John Powell, Dave Metzger, Germaine Franco, John Ashton Thomas, Jon Kull, Randy Kerber, Rick Giovinazzo
- Concertmaster – Bruce Dukov
- Score conductor – Pete Anthony
- Score contractor – Gina Zimmitti
- Recording – Tim Lauber
- Stage manager – Greg Dennen, Tom Steel

Management

- Business affairs (Twentieth Century Fox) – Tom Cavanaugh
- Music clearance (Twentieth Century Fox) – Ellen Ginsburg
- Executive in charge of music (Twentieth Century Fox) – Robert Kraft
- Music co-ordinator (Twentieth Century Fox) – Johnny Choi
- Music supervision (Twentieth Century Fox) – Danielle Diego
- Music production supervisor (Twentieth Century Fox) – Rebecca Morellato
